= Lleida (Congress of Deputies constituency) =

Electoral constituency in Spain

- Congress of Deputies; Electoral constituency
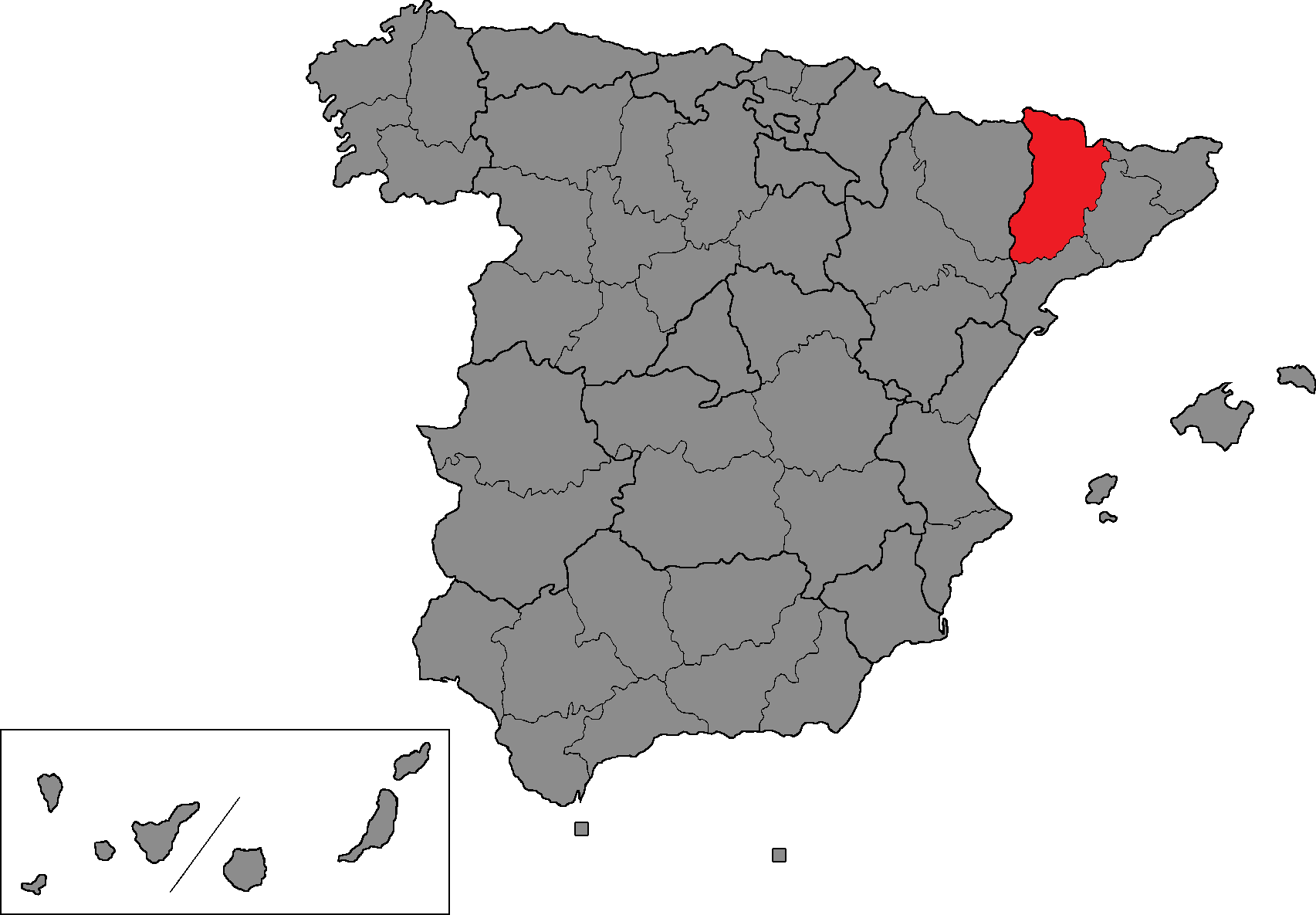
- Location of Lleida within Spain
- Province: Lleida
- Autonomous community: Catalonia
- Population: ▲451,197 (2024)
- Electorate: ▲317,225 (2023)
- Major settlements: Lleida

Current constituency
- Created: 1977
- Seats: 4
- Members: PSC (2); ERC (1); Junts (1)

Lleida (Spanish: Lérida) is one of the 52 constituencies represented in the Congress of Deputies, the lower chamber of the Spanish parliament, the Cortes Generales. The constituency (whose boundaries correspond to those of the homonymous province) currently elects four deputies. The electoral system uses the D'Hondt method and closed-list proportional voting, with a minimum threshold of three percent.

== Electoral system ==
The constituency was created as per the Political Reform Law and was first contested in the 1977 general election. The Law provided for the provinces of Spain to be established as multi-member districts in the Congress of Deputies, with this regulation being maintained under the Spanish Constitution of 1978. Additionally, the Constitution requires for any modification of the provincial limits to be approved under an organic law, needing an absolute majority in the Cortes Generales.

Voting is based on universal suffrage, comprising all Spanish nationals over 18 years of age with full political rights, provided that they have not been deprived of the right to vote by a final sentence. The only exception was in 1977, when this was limited to nationals over 21 years of age and in full enjoyment of their political and civil rights. Amendments in 2011 required non-resident citizens to apply for voting, a system known as "begged" voting (Spanish: Voto rogado). which was abolished in 2022. Further, amendments in 2018 granted the right to vote to those legally incapacitated. The Congress of Deputies has a minimum of 300 and a maximum of 400 seats, with electoral provisions fixing its size at 350. Of these, 348 are elected in 50 multi-member constituencies corresponding to the provinces of Spain—each of which is assigned an initial minimum of two seats and the remaining 248 distributed in proportion to population—using the D'Hondt method and closed-list proportional voting, with a three percent-threshold of valid votes (including blank ballots) in each constituency. The remaining two seats are allocated to Ceuta and Melilla as single-member districts elected by plurality voting. The use of this electoral method may result in a higher effective threshold depending on district magnitude and vote distribution. The law does not provide for by-elections to fill vacant seats; instead, any vacancies arising after the proclamation of candidates and during the legislative term are filled by the next candidates on the party lists or, when required, by designated substitutes.

The electoral law allows for parties and federations registered in the interior ministry, alliances and groupings of electors to present lists of candidates. Parties and federations intending to form an alliance are required to inform the relevant electoral commission within 10 days of the election call—15 before 1985—whereas groupings of electors need to secure the signature of at least one percent of the electorate in the constituencies for which they seek election—one permille of the electorate, with a compulsory minimum of 500 signatures, until 1985—disallowing electors from signing for more than one list. Also since 2011, parties, federations or alliances that have not obtained a mandate in either chamber of the Cortes at the preceding election are required to secure the signature of at least 0.1 percent of electors in the aforementioned constituencies. Amendments in 2007 required a balanced composition of men and women in the electoral lists, so that candidates of either sex made up at least 40 percent of the total composition; further amendments in 2024 required the use of a zipper system.

== Deputies ==
Deputies 1977–present
Key to parties ECP ERC SC PSC Junts JxCat–Junts PDC CDC DiL CiU CC–UCD PP CP AP
Legislature	Election	Distribution
Constituent	1977	1 / 2 / 1
1st	1979	1 / 1 / 2
2nd	1982	2 / 1 / 1
3rd	1986	1 / 2 / 1
4th	1989	2 / 2
5th	1993	1 / 2 / 1
6th	1996	1 / 2 / 1
7th	2000	1 / 2 / 1
8th	2004	1 / 2 / 1
9th	2008	2 / 1 / 1
10th	2011	1 / 2 / 1
11th	2015	1 / 1 / 1 / 1
12th	2016	1 / 1 / 1 / 1
13th	2019 (Apr)	2 / 1 / 1
14th	2019 (Nov)	2 / 1 / 1
15th	2023	1 / 2 / 1

== General elections ==
=== 2026 ===
Summary of the 29 November 2026 Congress of Deputies election results in Lleida
Parties and alliances	Popular vote			Seats	
Parties and alliances	Votes	%	±pp	Total	+/−
Socialists' Party of Catalonia (PSC–PSOE)					
Republican Left of Catalonia (ERC)					
Together for Catalonia (JxCat)					
People's Party (PP)					
Commons–Broad Front (Comuns–Front Ampli)^{1}					
Vox (Vox)					
Animalist Party with the Environment (PACMA)					
Workers' Front (FO)					
Communist Party of the Workers of Catalonia (PCTC)					
At the Same Time (Alhora)			New		
Blank ballots					
Total				4	±0
Valid votes					
Invalid votes					
Votes cast / turnout					
Abstentions					
Registered voters	326,300				
Sources
Footnotes: ^{1} Commons–Broad Front results are compared to the combined totals of Unite–In Common We Can and Zero Cuts in the 2023 election.

=== 2023 ===
Summary of the 23 July 2023 Congress of Deputies election results in Lleida
Parties and alliances	Popular vote			Seats	
Parties and alliances	Votes	%	±pp	Total	+/−
Socialists' Party of Catalonia (PSC–PSOE)	54,414	29.49	+15.03	2	+1
Republican Left of Catalonia (ERC)	34,331	18.60	–12.86	1	–1
Together for Catalonia (Junts)^{1}	33,228	18.01	n/a	1	+1
People's Party (PP)	23,699	12.84	+5.75	0	±0
Unite–In Common We Can (Sumar–ECP)^{2}	14,561	7.89	+0.01	0	±0
Vox (Vox)	12,560	6.81	+2.32	0	±0
Popular Unity Candidacy–For Rupture (CUP–PR)	5,449	2.95	–3.85	0	±0
Catalan European Democratic Party–CiU Space (PDeCAT–E–CiU)^{1}	1,865	1.01	n/a	0	–1
Animalist Party with the Environment (PACMA)^{3}	1,352	0.73	±0.00	0	±0
Blank Seats to Leave Empty Seats (EB)	462	0.25	New	0	±0
Workers' Front (FO)	247	0.13	New	0	±0
Communist Party of the Workers of Catalonia (PCTC)	192	0.10	+0.04	0	±0
Zero Cuts (Recortes Cero)	120	0.07	–0.02	0	±0
Blank ballots	2,059	1.12	+0.38		
Total	184,539			4	±0
Valid votes	184,539	98.72	–0.62		
Invalid votes	2,390	1.28	+0.62		
Votes cast / turnout	186,929	58.93	–7.45		
Abstentions	130,296	41.07	+7.45		
Registered voters	317,225				
Sources
Footnotes: ^{1} Within the Together for Catalonia–Together alliance in the November 2019 election.; ^{2} Unite–In Common We Can results are compared to the combined totals of In Common We Can–Let's Win the Change and More Country in the November 2019 election.; ^{3} Animalist Party with the Environment results are compared to Animalist Party Against Mistreatment of Animals totals in the November 2019 election.

=== November 2019 ===
Summary of the 10 November 2019 Congress of Deputies election results in Lleida
Parties and alliances	Popular vote			Seats	
Parties and alliances	Votes	%	±pp	Total	+/−
Republican Left of Catalonia–Sovereigntists (ERC–Sobiranistes)	65,236	31.46	–2.11	2	±0
Together for Catalonia–Together (JxCat–Junts)	46,773	22.56	+1.83	1	±0
Socialists' Party of Catalonia (PSC–PSOE)	29,983	14.46	–2.22	1	±0
In Common We Can–Let's Win the Change (ECP–Guanyem el Canvi)	16,337	7.88	–0.42	0	±0
People's Party (PP)	14,697	7.09	+2.15	0	±0
Popular Unity Candidacy–For Rupture (CUP–PR)	14,098	6.80	New	0	±0
Vox (Vox)	9,312	4.49	+1.83	0	±0
Citizens–Party of the Citizenry (Cs)	7,128	3.44	–5.05	0	±0
Animalist Party Against Mistreatment of Animals (PACMA)	1,521	0.73	–0.20	0	±0
Zero Cuts–Green Group (Recortes Cero–GV)	183	0.09	±0.00	0	±0
For a Fairer World (PUM+J)	169	0.08	+0.02	0	±0
Communist Party of the Catalan People (PCPC)	129	0.06	–0.03	0	±0
Communist Party of the Workers of Catalonia (PCTC)	126	0.06	New	0	±0
Left in Positive (IZQP)	124	0.06	±0.00	0	±0
Blank ballots	1,540	0.74	+0.08		
Total	207,356			4	±0
Valid votes	207,356	99.34	–0.05		
Invalid votes	1,375	0.66	+0.05		
Votes cast / turnout	208,731	66.38	–5.80		
Abstentions	105,694	33.62	+5.80		
Registered voters	314,425				

=== April 2019 ===
Summary of the 28 April 2019 Congress of Deputies election results in Lleida
Parties and alliances	Popular vote			Seats	
Parties and alliances	Votes	%	±pp	Total	+/−
Republican Left of Catalonia–Sovereigntists (ERC–Sobiranistes)	75,760	33.57	+8.44	2	+1
Together for Catalonia–Together (JxCat–Junts)^{1}	46,781	20.73	–1.89	1	±0
Socialists' Party of Catalonia (PSC–PSOE)	37,637	16.68	+4.24	1	+1
Citizens–Party of the Citizenry (Cs)	19,150	8.49	+1.54	0	±0
In Common We Can–Let's Win the Change (ECP–Guanyem el Canvi)	18,723	8.30	–8.36	0	–1
People's Party (PP)	11,153	4.94	–8.59	0	–1
Free People–We Are Alternative–Pirates: Republican Front (Front Republicà)	6,194	2.74	New	0	±0
Vox (Vox)	6,005	2.66	+2.55	0	±0
Animalist Party Against Mistreatment of Animals (PACMA)	2,089	0.93	–0.14	0	±0
Communist Party of the Catalan People (PCPC)	205	0.09	–0.06	0	±0
Zero Cuts–Green Group (Recortes Cero–GV)	204	0.09	–0.07	0	±0
Left in Positive (IZQP)	138	0.06	New	0	±0
For a Fairer World (PUM+J)	137	0.06	New	0	±0
Blank ballots	1,479	0.66	–0.53		
Total	225,655			4	±0
Valid votes	225,655	99.39	+0.35		
Invalid votes	1,391	0.61	–0.35		
Votes cast / turnout	227,046	72.18	+13.78		
Abstentions	87,512	27.82	–13.78		
Registered voters	314,558				
Sources
Footnotes: ^{1} Together for Catalonia–Together results are compared to Democratic Convergence of Catalonia totals in the 2016 election.

=== 2016 ===
Summary of the 26 June 2016 Congress of Deputies election results in Lleida
Parties and alliances	Popular vote			Seats	
Parties and alliances	Votes	%	±pp	Total	+/−
Republican Left–Catalonia Yes (ERC–CatSí)	45,525	25.13	+2.82	1	±0
Democratic Convergence of Catalonia (CDC)^{1}	40,985	22.62	–1.69	1	±0
In Common We Can–Let's Win the Change (ECP)	30,182	16.66	+1.29	1	±0
People's Party (PP)	24,503	13.53	+2.28	1	+1
Socialists' Party of Catalonia (PSC–PSOE)	22,533	12.44	+0.02	0	–1
Citizens–Party of the Citizenry (C's)	12,592	6.95	–2.06	0	±0
Animalist Party Against Mistreatment of Animals (PACMA)	1,930	1.07	+0.19	0	±0
Zero Cuts–Green Group (Recortes Cero–GV)	288	0.16	–0.04	0	±0
Communist Party of the Catalan People (PCPC)	267	0.15	–0.01	0	±0
Vox (Vox)	198	0.11	–0.12	0	±0
Blank ballots	2,156	1.19	+0.12		
Total	181,159			4	±0
Valid votes	181,159	99.04	–0.05		
Invalid votes	1,750	0.96	+0.05		
Votes cast / turnout	182,909	58.40	–5.49		
Abstentions	130,298	41.60	+5.49		
Registered voters	313,207				
Sources
Footnotes: ^{1} Democratic Convergence of Catalonia results are compared to Democracy and Freedom totals in the 2015 election.

=== 2015 ===
Summary of the 20 December 2015 Congress of Deputies election results in Lleida
Parties and alliances	Popular vote			Seats	
Parties and alliances	Votes	%	±pp	Total	+/−
Democracy and Freedom (DiL)^{1}	48,289	24.31	–17.01	1	–1
Republican Left of Catalonia–Catalonia Yes (ERC–CatSí)	44,317	22.31	+13.72	1	+1
In Common We Can (En Comú)^{2}	30,538	15.37	+11.48	1	+1
Socialists' Party of Catalonia (PSC–PSOE)	24,668	12.42	–7.93	1	±0
People's Party (PP)	22,360	11.25	–8.19	0	–1
Citizens–Party of the Citizenry (C's)	17,897	9.01	New	0	±0
Democratic Union of Catalonia (unio.cat)	4,867	2.45	New	0	±0
Animalist Party Against Mistreatment of Animals (PACMA)	1,743	0.88	+0.38	0	±0
Union, Progress and Democracy (UPyD)	687	0.35	–0.21	0	±0
Vox (Vox)	465	0.23	New	0	±0
Zero Cuts–Green Group (Recortes Cero–GV)	398	0.20	New	0	±0
Communist Party of the Catalan People (PCPC)	316	0.16	–0.02	0	±0
Blank ballots	2,124	1.07	–1.25		
Total	198,669			4	±0
Valid votes	198,669	99.09	+0.95		
Invalid votes	1,827	0.91	–0.95		
Votes cast / turnout	200,496	63.89	+1.35		
Abstentions	113,340	36.11	–1.35		
Registered voters	313,836				
Sources
Footnotes: ^{1} Democracy and Freedom results are compared to Convergence and Union totals in the 2011 election.; ^{2} In Common We Can results are compared to Initiative for Catalonia Greens–United and Alternative Left: Plural L. totals in the 2011 election.

=== 2011 ===
Summary of the 20 November 2011 Congress of Deputies election results in Lleida
Parties and alliances	Popular vote			Seats	
Parties and alliances	Votes	%	±pp	Total	+/−
Convergence and Union (CiU)	79,511	41.32	+12.75	2	+1
Socialists' Party of Catalonia (PSC–PSOE)	39,157	20.35	–16.88	1	–1
People's Party (PP)	37,401	19.44	+4.39	1	±0
Republican Left of Catalonia–Rally–Catalonia Yes (ERC–RI.cat)	16,529	8.59	–4.29	0	±0
Initiative for Catalonia Greens–United and Alternative Left: Plural L. (ICV–EUiA)	7,487	3.89	+1.32	0	±0
Blank Seats (EB)	2,573	1.34	+1.22	0	±0
Platform for Catalonia (PxC)	1,074	0.56	New	0	±0
Union, Progress and Democracy (UPyD)	1,069	0.56	+0.47	0	±0
Pirates of Catalonia (Pirata.cat)	915	0.48	New	0	±0
Animalist Party Against Mistreatment of Animals (PACMA)	892	0.46	+0.20	0	±0
Anti-capitalists (Anticapitalistas)	551	0.29	New	0	±0
For a Fairer World (PUM+J)	366	0.19	+0.12	0	±0
Communist Party of the Catalan People (PCPC)	355	0.18	+0.10	0	±0
Communist Unification of Spain (UCE)	91	0.05	New	0	±0
Blank ballots	4,468	2.32	+0.56		
Total	192,439			4	±0
Valid votes	192,439	98.14	–1.15		
Invalid votes	3,644	1.86	+1.15		
Votes cast / turnout	196,083	62.54	–6.44		
Abstentions	117,433	37.46	+6.44		
Registered voters	313,516				

=== 2008 ===
Summary of the 9 March 2008 Congress of Deputies election results in Lleida
Parties and alliances	Popular vote			Seats	
Parties and alliances	Votes	%	±pp	Total	+/−
Socialists' Party of Catalonia (PSC–PSOE)	79,500	37.23	+7.66	2	±0
Convergence and Union (CiU)	60,995	28.57	–0.89	1	±0
People's Party (PP)	32,129	15.05	+0.43	1	+1
Republican Left of Catalonia (esquerra)	27,511	12.88	–8.60	0	–1
Initiative for Catalonia Greens–United and Alternative Left (ICV–EUiA)	5,489	2.57	–0.39	0	±0
Catalan Republican Party (RC)	561	0.26	New	0	±0
Anti-Bullfighting Party Against Mistreatment of Animals (PACMA)	548	0.26	New	0	±0
Citizens–Party of the Citizenry (C's)	506	0.24	New	0	±0
Social Democratic Party (PSD)	386	0.18	New	0	±0
Unsubmissive Seats–Alternative of Discontented Democrats (Ei–ADD)	265	0.12	+0.06	0	±0
Citizens for Blank Votes (CenB)	223	0.10	+0.02	0	±0
Union, Progress and Democracy (UPyD)	199	0.09	New	0	±0
Party for Catalonia (PxCat)	190	0.09	New	0	±0
Communist Party of the Catalan People (PCPC)	180	0.08	+0.04	0	±0
Republican Left–Left Republican Party (IR–PRE)	179	0.08	–0.08	0	±0
National Democracy (DN)	165	0.08	+0.05	0	±0
For a Fairer World (PUM+J)	144	0.07	New	0	±0
Internationalist Socialist Workers' Party (POSI)	124	0.06	New	0	±0
Family and Life Party (PFiV)	98	0.05	+0.01	0	±0
Spanish Phalanx of the CNSO (FE de las JONS)	88	0.04	±0.00	0	±0
Humanist Party (PH)	81	0.04	±0.00	0	±0
Authentic Phalanx (FA)	46	0.02	New	0	±0
Carlist Party of Catalonia (PCdeC)	41	0.02	New	0	±0
Spanish Alternative (AES)	34	0.02	New	0	±0
Civil Liberties Party (PLCI)	30	0.01	New	0	±0
Internationalist Struggle (LI (LIT–CI))	25	0.01	±0.00	0	±0
Spain 2000 (E–2000)	25	0.01	New	0	±0
National Alliance (AN)	17	0.01	New	0	±0
Blank ballots	3,749	1.76	+0.96		
Total	213,528			4	±0
Valid votes	213,528	99.29	–0.30		
Invalid votes	1,518	0.71	+0.30		
Votes cast / turnout	215,046	68.98	–6.01		
Abstentions	96,727	31.02	+6.01		
Registered voters	311,773				

=== 2004 ===
Summary of the 14 March 2004 Congress of Deputies election results in Lleida
Parties and alliances	Popular vote			Seats	
Parties and alliances	Votes	%	±pp	Total	+/−
Socialists' Party of Catalonia (PSC–PSOE)	68,971	29.57	+1.96	2	+1
Convergence and Union (CiU)	68,735	29.46	–9.50	1	–1
Republican Left of Catalonia (ERC)	50,104	21.48	+14.32	1	+1
People's Party (PP)	34,116	14.62	–6.36	0	–1
Initiative for Catalonia Greens–United and Alternative Left (ICV–EUiA)^{1}	6,910	2.96	+0.21	0	±0
The Greens–The Ecologist Alternative (EV–AE)	1,171	0.50	New	0	±0
Republican Left–Left Republican Party (IR–PRE)	382	0.16	New	0	±0
Citizens for Blank Votes (CenB)	190	0.08	New	0	±0
Unsubmissive Seats–Alternative of Discontented Democrats (Ei–ADD)	135	0.06	New	0	±0
Communist Party of the Catalan People (PCPC)	102	0.04	New	0	±0
Humanist Party (PH)	96	0.04	–0.03	0	±0
Spanish Phalanx of the CNSO (FE de las JONS)	86	0.04	New	0	±0
Family and Life Party (PFiV)	86	0.04	New	0	±0
Democratic and Social Centre (CDS)	85	0.04	–0.03	0	±0
National Democracy (DN)	73	0.03	New	0	±0
The Phalanx (FE)	52	0.02	–0.05	0	±0
Caló Nationalist Party (PNCA)	46	0.02	–0.02	0	±0
Republican Social Movement (MSR)	36	0.02	New	0	±0
Internationalist Struggle (LI (LIT–CI))	33	0.01	–0.02	0	±0
Blank ballots	1,874	0.80	–0.64		
Total	233,283			4	±0
Valid votes	233,283	99.59	+0.36		
Invalid votes	961	0.41	–0.36		
Votes cast / turnout	234,244	74.99	+10.46		
Abstentions	78,113	25.01	–10.46		
Registered voters	312,357				
Sources
Footnotes: ^{1} Initiative for Catalonia Greens–United and Alternative Left results are compared to the combined totals of Initiative for Catalonia–Greens and United and Alternative Left in the 2000 election.

=== 2000 ===
Summary of the 12 March 2000 Congress of Deputies election results in Lleida
Parties and alliances	Popular vote			Seats	
Parties and alliances	Votes	%	±pp	Total	+/−
Convergence and Union (CiU)	78,131	38.96	–0.31	2	±0
Socialists' Party of Catalonia (PSC–PSOE)	55,374	27.61	–5.39	1	±0
People's Party (PP)	42,081	20.98	+3.10	1	±0
Republican Left of Catalonia (ERC)	14,367	7.16	+1.59	0	±0
Initiative for Catalonia–Greens (IC–V)	3,581	1.79	–1.53	0	±0
United and Alternative Left (EUiA)	1,931	0.96	New	0	±0
The Greens–Green Alternative (EV–AV)	864	0.43	New	0	±0
Internationalist Socialist Workers' Party (POSI)	356	0.18	New	0	±0
Catalan State (EC)	198	0.10	New	0	±0
Centrist Union–Democratic and Social Centre (UC–CDS)	149	0.07	±0.00	0	±0
Humanist Party (PH)	142	0.07	+0.02	0	±0
The Phalanx (FE)	139	0.07	New	0	±0
Natural Law Party (PLN)	115	0.06	New	0	±0
Caló Nationalist Party (PNCA)	71	0.04	New	0	±0
Internationalist Struggle (LI (LIT–CI))	64	0.03	New	0	±0
Spain 2000 Platform (ES2000)	61	0.03	New	0	±0
Spanish Democratic Party (PADE)	42	0.02	New	0	±0
Blank ballots	2,897	1.44	+0.73		
Total	200,563			4	±0
Valid votes	200,563	99.23	–0.38		
Invalid votes	1,561	0.77	+0.38		
Votes cast / turnout	202,124	64.53	–10.89		
Abstentions	111,115	35.47	+10.89		
Registered voters	313,239				

=== 1996 ===
Summary of the 3 March 1996 Congress of Deputies election results in Lleida
Parties and alliances	Popular vote			Seats	
Parties and alliances	Votes	%	±pp	Total	+/−
Convergence and Union (CiU)	88,880	39.27	–0.07	2	±0
Socialists' Party of Catalonia (PSC–PSOE)	74,686	33.00	+5.91	1	±0
People's Party (PP)	40,463	17.88	–1.88	1	±0
Republican Left of Catalonia (ERC)	12,615	5.57	–1.88	0	±0
Initiative for Catalonia–The Greens (IC–EV)	7,508	3.32	+0.10	0	±0
Workers' Revolutionary Party (PRT)^{1}	191	0.08	–0.21	0	±0
Centrist Union (UC)	154	0.07	–0.55	0	±0
Humanist Party (PH)	121	0.05	±0.00	0	±0
Citizen Independent Platform of Catalonia (PICC)	99	0.04	New	0	±0
Revolutionary Workers' Party (POR)	0	0.00	–0.07	0	±0
Blank ballots	1,601	0.71	–0.06		
Total	226,318			4	±0
Valid votes	226,318	99.61	+0.23		
Invalid votes	884	0.39	–0.23		
Votes cast / turnout	227,202	75.42	+2.38		
Abstentions	74,066	24.58	–2.38		
Registered voters	301,268				
Sources
Footnotes: ^{1} Workers' Revolutionary Party results are compared to Workers' Socialist Party totals in the 1993 election.

=== 1993 ===
Summary of the 6 June 1993 Congress of Deputies election results in Lleida
Parties and alliances	Popular vote			Seats	
Parties and alliances	Votes	%	±pp	Total	+/−
Convergence and Union (CiU)	83,092	39.34	–2.42	2	±0
Socialists' Party of Catalonia (PSC–PSOE)	57,218	27.09	–1.53	1	–1
People's Party (PP)	41,744	19.76	+7.38	1	+1
Republican Left of Catalonia (ERC)	15,742	7.45	+3.79	0	±0
Initiative for Catalonia (IC)	6,798	3.22	–0.51	0	±0
The Greens (EV)^{1}	1,563	0.74	–0.47	0	±0
Democratic and Social Centre (CDS)	1,310	0.62	–3.35	0	±0
Workers' Socialist Party (PST)	614	0.29	–0.08	0	±0
The Ecologists (LE)	530	0.25	–0.40	0	±0
Ruiz-Mateos Group–European Democratic Alliance (ARM–ADE)	520	0.25	–0.92	0	±0
Revolutionary Workers' Party (POR)	155	0.07	–0.02	0	±0
Natural Law Party (PLN)	143	0.07	New	0	±0
Humanist Party (PH)	98	0.05	–0.04	0	±0
Coalition for a New Socialist Party (CNPS)^{2}	72	0.03	–0.04	0	±0
Communist Unification of Spain (UCE)	0	0.00	New	0	±0
Freixes Independent Group (Freixes)	0	0.00	New	0	±0
Blank ballots	1,618	0.77	+0.04		
Total	211,217			4	±0
Valid votes	211,217	99.38	–0.02		
Invalid votes	1,316	0.62	+0.02		
Votes cast / turnout	212,533	73.04	+7.80		
Abstentions	78,450	26.96	–7.80		
Registered voters	290,983				
Sources
Footnotes: ^{1} The Greens results are compared to the combined totals of Green Alternative–Ecologist Movement of Catalonia and The Greens–Green List in the 1989 election.; ^{2} Coalition for a New Socialist Party results are compared to Alliance for the Republic totals in the 1989 election.

=== 1989 ===
Summary of the 29 October 1989 Congress of Deputies election results in Lérida
Parties and alliances	Popular vote			Seats	
Parties and alliances	Votes	%	±pp	Total	+/−
Convergence and Union (CiU)	76,602	41.76	+1.07	2	±0
Socialists' Party of Catalonia (PSC–PSOE)	52,504	28.62	–1.89	2	+1
People's Party (PP)^{1}	22,713	12.38	–3.74	0	–1
Democratic and Social Centre (CDS)	7,282	3.97	+0.73	0	±0
Initiative for Catalonia (IC)^{2}	6,835	3.73	+1.21	0	±0
Republican Left of Catalonia (ERC)	6,715	3.66	+0.58	0	±0
Green Alternative–Ecologist Movement of Catalonia (AV–MEC)^{3}	2,216	1.21	+0.05	0	±0
Ruiz-Mateos Group (Ruiz-Mateos)	2,154	1.17	New	0	±0
The Ecologist Greens (EVE)	1,186	0.65	New	0	±0
Party of the Communists of Catalonia (PCC)	919	0.50	–0.25	0	±0
Ecologist Party of Catalonia–VERDE (PEC–VERDE)	723	0.39	New	0	±0
Workers' Socialist Party (PST)	674	0.37	+0.03	0	±0
Workers' Party of Spain–Communist Unity (PTE–UC)^{4}	480	0.26	–0.08	0	±0
Social Democratic Coalition (CSD)^{5}	418	0.23	+0.02	0	±0
Revolutionary Workers' Party of Spain (PORE)	170	0.09	±0.00	0	±0
Humanist Party of Catalonia (PHC)	158	0.09	New	0	±0
Centrist Unity–Democratic Spanish Party (PED)	153	0.08	New	0	±0
Alliance for the Republic (AxR)^{6}	120	0.07	–0.06	0	±0
Valencian Nationalist Left–Valencian Regional Union (ENV–URV)	81	0.04	New	0	±0
The Greens–Green List (EV–LV)	0	0.00	New	0	±0
Blank ballots	1,341	0.73	+0.27		
Total	183,444			4	±0
Valid votes	183,444	99.40	+0.15		
Invalid votes	1,113	0.60	–0.15		
Votes cast / turnout	184,557	65.24	–2.41		
Abstentions	98,311	34.76	+2.41		
Registered voters	282,868				
Sources
Footnotes: ^{1} People's Party results are compared to People's Coalition totals in the 1986 election.; ^{2} Initiative for Catalonia results are compared to Union of the Catalan Left totals in the 1986 election.; ^{3} Green Alternative–Ecologist Movement of Catalonia results are compared to Green Alternative List totals in the 1986 election.; ^{4} Workers' Party of Spain–Communist Unity results are compared to Communists' Unity Board totals in the 1986 election.; ^{5} Social Democratic Coalition results are compared to Social Democratic Party of Catalonia totals in the 1986 election.; ^{6} Alliance for the Republic results are compared to Internationalist Socialist Workers' Party totals in the 1986 election.

=== 1986 ===
Summary of the 22 June 1986 Congress of Deputies election results in Lérida
Parties and alliances	Popular vote			Seats	
Parties and alliances	Votes	%	±pp	Total	+/−
Convergence and Union (CiU)	77,645	40.69	+12.73	2	+1
Socialists' Party of Catalonia (PSC–PSOE)	58,221	30.51	–4.73	1	–1
People's Coalition (AP–PDP–PL)^{1}	30,759	16.12	+0.28	1	±0
Democratic and Social Centre (CDS)	6,189	3.24	+0.11	0	±0
Republican Left of Catalonia (ERC)	5,880	3.08	–2.77	0	±0
Union of the Catalan Left (PSUC–ENE)^{2}	4,811	2.52	–1.02	0	±0
Green Alternative List (LAV)	2,222	1.16	New	0	±0
Party of the Communists of Catalonia (PCC)	1,430	0.75	–0.23	0	±0
Workers' Socialist Party (PST)	704	0.37	–0.26	0	±0
Communists' Unity Board (MUC)	642	0.34	New	0	±0
Social Democratic Party of Catalonia (PSDC)	395	0.21	New	0	±0
Internationalist Socialist Workers' Party (POSI)	241	0.13	New	0	±0
Communist Unification of Spain (UCE)	238	0.12	+0.01	0	±0
Spanish Phalanx of the CNSO (FE–JONS)	211	0.11	New	0	±0
Republican Popular Unity (UPR)^{3}	189	0.10	–0.01	0	±0
Revolutionary Workers' Party of Spain (PORE)	179	0.09	New	0	±0
Blank ballots	873	0.46	+0.05		
Total	190,829			4	±0
Valid votes	190,829	99.25	+0.44		
Invalid votes	1,446	0.75	–0.44		
Votes cast / turnout	192,275	67.65	–8.19		
Abstentions	91,956	32.35	+8.19		
Registered voters	284,231				
Sources
Footnotes: ^{1} People's Coalition results are compared to People's Alliance–People's Democratic Party totals in the 1982 election.; ^{2} Union of the Catalan Left results are compared to Unified Socialist Party of Catalonia totals in the 1982 election.; ^{3} Republican Popular Unity results are compared to Communist Party of Spain (Marxist–Leninist) totals in the 1982 election.

=== 1982 ===
Summary of the 28 October 1982 Congress of Deputies election results in Lérida
Parties and alliances	Popular vote			Seats	
Parties and alliances	Votes	%	±pp	Total	+/−
Socialists' Party of Catalonia (PSC–PSOE)	70,821	35.24	+10.30	2	+1
Convergence and Union (CiU)	56,188	27.96	+12.05	1	±0
People's Alliance–People's Democratic Party (AP–PDP)^{1}	31,832	15.84	+12.64	1	+1
Republican Left of Catalonia (ERC)	11,748	5.85	–1.90	0	±0
Centrists of Catalonia (CC–UCD)	11,484	5.71	–25.97	0	–2
Democratic and Social Centre (CDS)	6,286	3.13	New	0	±0
Unified Socialist Party of Catalonia (PSUC–PCE)	5,495	2.73	–7.92	0	±0
Party of the Communists of Catalonia (PCC)	1,960	0.98	New	0	±0
Left Nationalists (NE)	1,630	0.81	New	0	±0
Workers' Socialist Party (PST)	1,273	0.63	New	0	±0
New Force (FN)^{2}	743	0.37	–0.72	0	±0
Communist Front of Catalonia (FCC)^{3}	255	0.13	–0.09	0	±0
Communist Party of Spain (Marxist–Leninist) (PCE (m–l))	227	0.11	New	0	±0
Communist Unification of Spain (UCE)	216	0.11	New	0	±0
Blank ballots	833	0.41	+0.02		
Total	200,991			4	±0
Valid votes	200,991	98.81	+0.23		
Invalid votes	2,412	1.19	–0.23		
Votes cast / turnout	203,403	75.84	+10.57		
Abstentions	64,802	24.16	–10.57		
Registered voters	268,205				
Sources
Footnotes: ^{1} People's Alliance–People's Democratic Party results are compared to Democratic Coalition totals in the 1979 election.; ^{2} New Force results are compared to National Union totals in the 1979 election.; ^{3} Communist Front of Catalonia results are compared to Revolutionary Communist League totals in the 1979 election.

=== 1979 ===
Summary of the 1 March 1979 Congress of Deputies election results in Lérida
Parties and alliances	Popular vote			Seats	
Parties and alliances	Votes	%	±pp	Total	+/−
Centrists of Catalonia (CC–UCD)^{1}	54,540	31.68	+7.37	2	+1
Socialists' Party of Catalonia (PSC–PSOE)^{2}	42,937	24.94	+9.98	1	±0
Convergence and Union (CiU)^{3}	27,399	15.91	–17.99	1	–1
Unified Socialist Party of Catalonia (PSUC–PCE)	18,340	10.65	–1.55	0	±0
Republican Left of Catalonia–National Front of Catalonia (ERC–FNC)^{4}	13,336	7.75	+0.16	0	±0
Democratic Coalition (CD)^{5}	5,509	3.20	–2.22	0	±0
Party of Labour of Catalonia (PTC–PTE)	1,914	1.11	New	0	±0
National Union (UN)	1,875	1.09	New	0	±0
Left Bloc for National Liberation (BEAN)	1,476	0.86	New	0	±0
Republican Left (IR)	1,066	0.62	New	0	±0
Communist Organization of Spain (Red Flag) (OCE–BR)	618	0.36	New	0	±0
Communist Movement–Organization of Communist Left (MC–OIC)	562	0.33	New	0	±0
Catalan State (EC)	561	0.33	New	0	±0
Carlist Party (PC)	461	0.27	New	0	±0
Revolutionary Communist League (LCR)	371	0.22	New	0	±0
Workers' Revolutionary Organization (ORT)^{6}	355	0.21	–0.49	0	±0
Union for the Freedom of Speech (ULE)	171	0.10	New	0	±0
Spanish Phalanx–Falangist Unity (FE–UF)	0	0.00	New	0	±0
Blank ballots	679	0.39	+0.19		
Total	172,170			4	±0
Valid votes	172,170	98.58	+0.07		
Invalid votes	2,486	1.42	–0.07		
Votes cast / turnout	174,656	65.27	–12.66		
Abstentions	92,928	34.73	+12.66		
Registered voters	267,584				
Sources
Footnotes: ^{1} Centrists of Catalonia results are compared to Union of the Democratic Centre totals in the 1977 election.; ^{2} Socialists' Party of Catalonia results are compared to Socialists of Catalonia totals in the 1977 election.; ^{3} Convergence and Union results are compared to the combined totals of Democratic Pact for Catalonia and Union of the Centre and Christian Democracy of Catalonia in the 1977 election.; ^{4} Republican Left of Catalonia–National Front of Catalonia results are compared to Left of Catalonia–Democratic Electoral Front totals in the 1977 election.; ^{5} Democratic Coalition results are compared to Catalan Coexistence–People's Alliance totals in the 1977 election.; ^{6} Workers' Revolutionary Organization results are compared to Workers' Electoral Group totals in the 1977 election.

=== 1977 ===
Summary of the 15 June 1977 Congress of Deputies election results in Lérida
Parties and alliances	Popular vote			Seats	
Parties and alliances	Votes	%	±pp	Total	+/−
Democratic Pact for Catalonia (PDC)	45,428	24.44	n/a	2	n/a
Union of the Democratic Centre (UCD)	45,191	24.31	n/a	1	n/a
Socialists of Catalonia (PSC–PSOE)	27,809	14.96	n/a	1	n/a
Unified Socialist Party of Catalonia (PSUC–PCE)	22,680	12.20	n/a	0	n/a
Union of the Centre and Christian Democracy of Catalonia (UCiDCC)	17,582	9.46	n/a	0	n/a
Left of Catalonia–Democratic Electoral Front (EC–FED)	14,118	7.59	n/a	0	n/a
Catalan Coexistence–People's Alliance (CC–AP)	10,067	5.42	n/a	0	n/a
Catalan Social Reform (RSC)	1,356	0.73	n/a	0	n/a
Workers' Electoral Group (AET)	1,295	0.70	n/a	0	n/a
Blank ballots	369	0.20	n/a		
Total	185,895			4	n/a
Valid votes	185,895	98.51	n/a		
Invalid votes	2,820	1.49	n/a		
Votes cast / turnout	188,715	77.93	n/a		
Abstentions	53,433	22.07	n/a		
Registered voters	242,148				

== Bibliography ==
- Ley 1/1977, de 4 de enero, para la Reforma Política (Fundamental Law 1/1977). Official State Gazette (in Spanish). 4 January 1977. BOE-A-1977-165.
- Real Decreto-ley 20/1977, de 18 de marzo, sobre Normas Electorales (Royal Decree-Law 20/1977). Official State Gazette (in Spanish). 18 March 1977. BOE-A-1977-7445.
- Constitución Española (Constitution). Official State Gazette (in Spanish). 27 December 1978. BOE-A-1978-31229.
- Ley Orgánica 5/1985, de 19 de junio, del Régimen Electoral General (Organic Law 5/1985). Official State Gazette (in Spanish). 19 June 1985. BOE-A-1985-11672.
- Carreras de Odriozola, Albert; Tafunell Sambola, Xavier (2005) [1989]. Estadísticas históricas de España, siglos XIX-XX (PDF) (in Spanish). Vol. 1 (II ed.). Bilbao: Fundación BBVA. pp. 1072–1097. ISBN 84-96515-00-1. Archived from the original (PDF) on 24 September 2015.
