= Centrists of Catalonia =

Defunct political party in Catalonia

Centrists of Catalonia Centristes de Catalunya
- President: Antón Cañellas
- Founded: 17 June 1978 ("liaison committee"); 24 November 1978 (alliance); 22 December 1979 (party)
- Dissolved: February 1983
- Merger of: Union of the Democratic Centre in Catalonia; Democratic Union–Broad Centre
- Youth wing: Centrist Youth of Catalonia
- Ideology: Christian democracy Social liberalism Regionalism; Autonomism
- Political position: Centre
- National affiliation: Union of the Democratic Centre
- Members: See list of members

Centrists of Catalonia (Catalan: Centristes de Catalunya, Spanish: Centristas de Cataluña, CC–UCD) was a Catalan-based electoral alliance formed in June 1978 ahead of the upcoming local and general elections, comprising the Catalan section of the Union of the Democratic Centre (UCD), the Union of the Centre of Catalonia (UCC) and the Democratic Union–Broad Centre (UDCA). The alliance was maintained after the election, with UCD and UDCA agreeing to transform it into a full-fledged political party in December 1979 with the disagreement of the UCC, which chose not to join the new party. At its foundation congress held on 22 December 1979, Antón Cañellas was elected as new party president.

== History ==
=== Origins and establishment ===
Centrists of Catalonia had its roots in the relative success achieved by Prime Minister Adolfo Suárez-supported Union of the Democratic Centre (UDC)'s lists in Catalonia in the 1977 Spanish general election, despite having been hastily made within 48 hours and comprised only independent candidates after nullifying a previously-signed alliance between the People's Party of Catalonia and the Social Democratic Party of Catalonia. These had garnered the support of 16.9% of Catalan voters, finishing in third place ahead of other alliances appealing to the centre Catalan ground such as the Democratic Pact for Catalonia—which included Democratic Convergence of Catalonia (CDC) and Democratic Left of Catalonia (EDC) as the alliance's main promoters—and the Union of the Centre and Christian Democracy of Catalonia—which comprised the Democratic Union of Catalonia (UDC) and the Catalan Centre (CC).

The UCD's electoral strength relative to other centrist parties and the influence it had as the party in the government of Spain seduced various political actors, giving way to movements seeking the establishment of closer ties with the party in Catalonia. On the one hand, the Catalan Centre started negotiations with the UCD Catalan branch and other political parties throughout the second half of 1977, leading to the establishment of the Union of the Centre of Catalonia (UCC) in March 1978, with which the UCD would first sign an electoral agreement for the local elections, then establish a common platform in June that year—often referred to as a "liaison political committee"—to oversee a future merger between both parties. This course of action was initially met with skepticism within several UCD sectors, with some remaining reluctant of negotiating under equal conditions with political groups failing to garner any electoral successes, and some others—such as Adolfo Suárez himself—being weary of consenting to a breakdown of the UCD's organic unity in order to create an autonomous party in Catalonia.

On the other hand, the internal crisis within the Democratic Union of Catalonia resulting from its poor election results, coupled with its quest for a strong electoral ally, divided the party among those favouring a rapprochement to the CDC–EDC bloc and those advocating for a merger with the UCD to form a large Catalan-based centrist platform. This would see two party splits: the first one in September 1977, with the creation of the Union of the Christian Democrats of Catalonia–Jacques Maritain Club which would become one of the constituent parties of the UCC; then, the Democratic Union–Broad Centre (UDCA) of Antón Cañellas would follow in November 1978. Cañellas and the UDCA engaged in talks with the UCD–UCC platform, leading to the establishment of the "Centrists of Catalonia" alliance on 24 November 1978.

=== Transformation into a party ===
The newly-formed alliance would contest the 1979 general and local elections—seeing a moderate success in the former and more discreet results in the latter—with its ultimate goal being to negotiate the full merger of its constituent parties into the UCD to grant it "full Catalanist and democratic credibility", as well as advancing towards their common goal of establishing a "broad centre" space. In October 1979, the UCD leadership would authorize the establishment of Centrists of Catalonia as an autonomous party linked to its national counterpart, with a congress scheduled to be held in December—ahead of the regional election scheduled for early 1980—to oversee the merger of the Catalan UCD, the UCC and UDCA into the new party. This move sparked divisions within the regional UCD between two sectors: the "autonomists"—in defense of greater autonomy and provincialization of the new party—and the "centralists"—advocating instead for a presidencialist structure that was to be subordinated to the UCD's national leadership.

Another issue was the composition of the future party's executive committee, with UCC and UDCA pushing for a greater presence and warning of their willingness in engage in talks with CDC instead in the event of not achieving their proposed party model. These conflicts would result in a UCD sector led by Juan José Folchi and in UCC not attending the merger congress in Girona, with the latter ultimately choosing not to continue with the merger process. UDCA leader Antón Cañellas would be elected as the party's first president.

== Composition ==
Party	Notes
Union of the Democratic Centre (UCD)	
Democratic Union–Broad Centre (UDCA)	Joined in November 1978.
Union of the Centre of Catalonia (UCC)	Left in December 1979.

== Electoral performance ==
=== Parliament of Catalonia ===
Parliament of Catalonia
Election	Votes	%	#	Seats	+/–	Leading candidate	Status in legislature
1980	286,922	10.61%	4th	18 / 135	—	Anton Cañellas	Confidence and supply

=== Cortes Generales ===
Cortes Generales
Election	Catalonia									
Election	Congress					Senate				
Election	Votes	%	#	Seats	+/–	Votes		%	Seats	+/–
1979	570,948	19.35%	2nd	12 / 47	3 (Note: Compared to Union of the Democratic Centre totals in the 1977 general election.)	Candidates 1 Candidates 2 Candidates 3	507,358; 498,850; 479,815	17.52% 17.23% 16.57%	4 / 16	3
1982	70,235	2.04%	6th	0 / 47	12	Candidates 1 Candidates 2 Candidates 3	85,074; 75,686; 71,581	2.63% 2.34% 2.21%	0 / 16	4
