= Union of the Centre of Catalonia =

Political party

Union of the Centre of Catalonia Unió de Centre de Catalunya
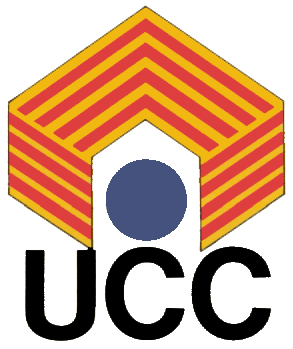
- President: Carles Güell de Sentmenat
- Secretary-General: Joaquim Molins
- Founded: 21 March 1978
- Dissolved: March 1981
- Merger of: Catalan Centre; League of Catalonia–Catalan Liberal Party; Union of the Christian Democrats of Catalonia–Jacques Maritain Club; Social Democratic Party of Catalonia (most); Party of the Catalan People
- Merged into: Democratic Convergence of Catalonia
- Ideology: Liberalism; Progressivism; Christian democracy Social democracy Catalanism
- Political position: Centre
- Regional affiliation: Centrists of Catalonia (1978–79)

Union of the Centre of Catalonia (Catalan: Unió de Centre de Catalunya, UCC) was a political party based in Catalonia, created in March 1978 as a result of the merger of Catalan Centre, League of Catalonia–Catalan Liberal Party, Union of the Christian Democrats of Catalonia–Jacques Maritain Club, most of the Social Democratic Party of Catalonia and Party of the Catalan People. The party was led by Carles Güell as president and Joaquim Molins as secretary-general.

== History ==
The Union of the Centre of Catalonia was formed in March 1978 by the merger of a number of political parties supportive of establishing closer ties with the Union of the Democratic Centre: the Catalan Centre, the Union of the Christian Democrats of Catalonia–Jacques Maritain Club—a split from the Democratic Union of Catalonia (Unió)—the Party of the Catalan People, members from the League of Catalonia–Catalan Liberal Party and most of the Social Democratic Party of Catalonia.

Immediately after its foundation, the party sought a merger with the UCD, which resulted in an electoral agreement being signed for the first democratic local elections; subsequently, a UCD–UCC platform—often referred to as a "liaison political committee"—would be established in June 1978 to oversee the planned merger process. Later, the expulsion of Unió deputy Antón Cañellas because of his support of the UDC–UCC bloc would see the formation of the Democratic Union–Broad Centre (UDCA) in November and its subsequent incorporation into the joint centrist platform, paving the way for the formation of the "Centrists of Catalonia" electoral alliance.

Having been initially supportive of the merger, UCC started drifting away from the new political space over differences with the planned organizational structure of the new party—which it saw as too presidential-centered around the figure of Cañellas—as well as with the limitations on its political autonomy in favour of a greater subordination to the national UCD party. The party's leadership under secretary-general Joaquim Molins attempted to have the merger congress delayed in order to be able to negotiate these issues, but the UCC chose not to attend the congress, ultimately leading to its decision in January 1980 to cancel the merger process with the UCD–UDCA.

UCC would refuse to field any candidates in the 1980 Catalan regional election—granting support to Democratic Convergence of Catalonia (CDC) lists instead—leading Güell and other members to leave the party in disagreement with Molins's leadership. The party would maintain close ties with CDC, first with Molins joining the Catalan Minority Group in the Congress, and then with an agreement in September 1980 for the incorporation of the party into CDC, which would be formalized in the last UCC congress held in March 1981.

== Electoral performance ==
=== Cortes Generales ===
Cortes Generales
Election	Catalonia						
Election	Congress					Senate	
Election	Votes	%	#	Seats	+/–	Seats	+/–
1979	Within CC–UCD			1 / 47	1	1 / 16	1
