= Democratic Union–Broad Centre =

Democratic Union–Broad Centre Unió Democràtica–Centre Ampli
- Secretary-General: Antón Cañellas
- Founded: 14 November 1978
- Dissolved: 22 December 1979
- Split from: Democratic Union of Catalonia
- Merged into: Centrists of Catalonia
- Newspaper: Centre Ampli
- Membership (1979): 300
- Ideology: Christian democracy Centrism
- Political position: Centre to centre-right
- Regional affiliation: Centrists of Catalonia

Democratic Union–Broad Centre (Catalan: Unió Democràtica–Centre Ampli, UDCA) was a Catalan political party founded in November 1978 by Antón Cañellas, together with other former Democratic Union of Catalonia (UDC) members—such as Francesc Blanch i Terrades, Santiago Guillén or Josep-Rafel Carreras de Nadal—after being expelled from the UDC because of his support to the electoral platform established by the Union of the Democratic Centre (UCD) and the Union of the Centre of Catalonia (UCC). The party would be officially registered in the interior ministry on 19 December 1978, with Cañellas as its secretary-general.

In December 1979 it would be merged into the Centrists of Catalonia alliance, with Cañellas becoming the president of the newly unified party. At the time of its dissolution, the party had 300 members.

== Electoral performance ==
=== Cortes Generales ===
Cortes Generales
Election	Catalonia						
Election	Congress					Senate	
Election	Votes	%	#	Seats	+/–	Seats	+/–
1979	Within CC–UCD			1 / 47	1	0 / 16	0
