= Democracy and Catalonia =

Democracy and Catalonia Democràcia i Catalunya
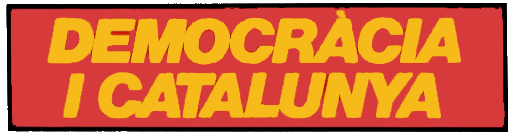
- Abbreviation: DiC
- Founded: 3 May 1977
- Dissolved: 1978
- Succeeded by: Convergence and Union
- Headquarters: Barcelona
- Ideology: Catalan nationalism Autonomism
- Political position: Big tent
- Members: See list of members

Democracy and Catalonia (Catalan: Democràcia i Catalunya, DiC) was a Catalan electoral alliance formed by Democratic Convergence of Catalonia (CDC), Democratic Left of Catalonia (EDC), Democratic Union of Catalonia (UDC) and Socialist Party of Catalonia–Regrouping (PSC–R) to contest the 1977 Spanish Senate election.

== History ==
The origins of the Democracy and Catalonia alliance can be traced back to Socialist Party of Catalonia–Congress (PSC–C) secretary-general Joan Reventós's proposal in December 1976 for establishing a broad "Catalan agreement" (Catalan: entesa catalana) comprising all Catalanist parties for the Spanish Senate 1977 election that would ensure a strong Catalan presence in the newly-elected parliament and in support of the Catalan Statute and of the restoration of the Generalitat de Catalunya. As the heavily crowded Catalan political space was in the process of reorganization ahead of the general election, speculation emerged in late March 1977 that talks were ongoing for a broad agreement of political parties within the centre ground of the political spectrum, including the Catalan Centre (CC), the Socialist Party of Catalonia–Regrouping (PSC–R), Democratic Union of Catalonia (UDC), Democratic Convergence of Catalonia (CDC), Democratic Left of Catalonia (EDC), the Social Democratic Party of Catalonia (PSDC) and the National Front of Catalonia (FNC); such an alliance was planned to be running under the "Democracy and Catalonia" label.

While the Democracy and Catalonia alliance had been initially scheduled to comprise all Catalan democratic opposition parties within a joint candidacy of broad spectrum, on 3 May 1977 it came to be established by the parties forming the Democratic Pact for Catalonia (CDC, EDC, FNC and PSC–R) and the Union of the Centre and Christian Democracy of Catalonia (CC and UDC) electoral coalitions to the Congress of Deputies, excluding the parties that would go on to form the Agreement of the Catalans over the incorporation of the communist Unified Socialist Party of Catalonia (PSUC) in the lists.

== Composition ==
Party
Democratic Convergence of Catalonia (CDC)
Socialist Party of Catalonia–Regrouping (PSC–R)
Democratic Left of Catalonia (EDC)
National Front of Catalonia (FNC)
Democratic Union of Catalonia (UDC)
Catalan Centre (CC)

== Electoral performance ==
=== Senate ===
Senate
Election	Catalonia				
Election	Votes		%	Seats	+/–
1977	Candidates 1 Candidates 2 Candidates 3	539,856; 471,983; 315,563	17.72% 15.49% 10.36%	2 / 16	—
