= Democratic Union of Catalonia =

Political party in Spain

Democratic Union of Catalonia Unió Democràtica de Catalunya
- Abbreviation: UDC, unio.cat
- Founded: 7 November 1931
- Registered: 3 March 1977
- Dissolved: 24 March 2017
- Succeeded by: United to Advance
- Headquarters: C/ Nàpols, 35-39; 08018, Barcelona
- Ideology: Regionalism; Christian democracy; Pro-Europeanism
- Political position: Centre-right
- National affiliation: Union of the Centre and Christian Democracy of Catalonia (1976–77); Democracy and Catalonia (1977–78); Convergence and Union (1978–2015); Catalonia in the Senate (1982–83)
- European affiliation: European People's Party
- European Parliament group: European People's Party
- International affiliation: Centrist Democrat International; Historical: White International
- Colors: Blue; White

Website
- www.unio.cat

The Democratic Union of Catalonia (Catalan: Unió Democràtica de Catalunya; IPA: [uniˈo ðəmuˈkɾatikə ðə kətəˈluɲə], UDC), frequently shortened as Union (Catalan: Unió; IPA: [uniˈo]), was a regionalist, Christian-democratic political party in the Catalonia region of Spain existing between 1931 and 2017. Together with Democratic Convergence of Catalonia (CDC), they formed the Convergence and Union (CiU) alliance and federation from 1978 until its dissolution in 2015, under which they would rule the government of Catalonia for almost three decades during the recent Spanish democratic period.

It described itself as Catalan nationalist and Christian-democratic and was a member of the European People's Party (EPP). It advocated for centrist and moderate Catalanism without explicitly renouncing independence, aiming for the constitution of a confederal state in Spain made up of sovereign entities (including Catalonia) that could become independent but rejecting unilateralism as a viable political philosophy.

After the breakup of CiU, a party split that took away half of its membership, and UDC's failure in securing parliamentary representation in the 2015 Catalan and Spanish general elections, the party's mounting debts brought it to bankruptcy, leading to its dissolution on 24 March 2017.

== History ==
=== Transition to democracy ===
Ahead of the 1977 Spanish general election, Unió joined the Union of the Centre and Christian Democracy of Catalonia (UCiDCC) alliance together with the Catalan Centre (CC) for the Congress of Deputies, which received the support of the Christian Democratic Team of the Spanish State (EDCEE). Both parties also joined the Democracy and Catalonia coalition for the Senate, whereas talks for Unió to join the Democratic Front coalition formed by Democratic Convergence of Catalonia (CDC) and Democratic Left of Catalonia (EDC) failed to materialize. Election results were disappointing: the UCiDCC secured only two seats in Congress, one for each party, and the platform's nationwide referent the EDCEE failed to gain any parliamentary representation. This led to both Unió and CC breaking their alliance and going into different parliamentary groups.

After the election, an internal party crisis ensued as Unió found itself in need of seeking collaboration with other political parties to ensure its electoral viability in the future, with the question on the direction of such alliances dividing the party in two sectors: a more Catalan nationalist and progressive, centre-left one, and another more conservative one, attracted to the UCD's government halo and sympathetic to a merger with their former ally CC. The internal support for each position would be revealed ahead of the 6th Unió congress in September 1977, with the pro-UCD sector being in the minority, resulting in a group of 17 members led by Josep Miró i Ardèvol splitting into the Union of the Christian Democrats of Catalonia–Jacques Maritain Club, which would merge with other parties into the Union of the Centre of Catalonia (UCC) in March 1978 to join into a joint platform with the UCD. However, and despite the 6th congress resulting in a reinforcement of the party's identity as well as its more progressive turn, the internal crisis continued as Unió deputy in Congress Antón Cañellas kept advocating for a "large Catalan centre" that included the UCD. This position—which only garnered the support of about 15–20% of party members—was in clear contrast with the majority position of favouring a centre-left federation of parties that included CDC while rejecting any kind of election agreement with the regional branches of national parties.

In September 1978, Unió would sign an agreement with CDC to form Convergence and Union (CiU), an alliance initially appealing to the Catalan centre-left that would end up becoming a big tent platform lasting for the next 37 years. The CiU negotiations had seen political clashing ensue between Unió and Cañellas because of the latter's courtship of the UCD–UCC platform. In the 7th Unió congress held in November 1978, Cañellas was expelled from the party, prompting him together with other party members to establish the Democratic Union–Broad Centre (UDCA), an instrumental party that would join the UCD and UCC into the newly established Centrists of Catalonia coalition.

=== CiU breakup and dissolution ===
From 2013 and until 2015 tensions within the two parties forming the Convergence and Union (CiU) federation reached an all-time high over differences between the positions of the UDC leadership and Democratic Convergence of Catalonia (CDC) leader Artur Mas over the sovereignty process, as well as on the opportunity of forming a joint, pro-independence electoral list with Republican Left of Catalonia (ERC). CDC was in favour of outright independence even if it meant breaking the established Spanish legality, while UDC was against doing it without agreement with the Spanish government.

As a result, a referendum of UDC members was held on 14 June 2015, asking whether UDC should commit itself to continue with the process but with under certain conditions, including not violating the legality in force through unilateral independence declarations or starting a constituent process at the margin of Spanish legal norms. Such a position, supported by UDC leaders and contrary to the signed agreements between CDC, ERC and sovereignty entities, was approved by UDC members with an adjusted 50.9%. After this, meetings between CiU leaders led to an ultimatum from CDC to UDC for the latter to decide within "two or three days" whether it committed itself to the independence plan. This led to UDC withdrawing all three of its members from Mas's cabinet, although they agreed to maintain parliamentary stability until the end of the legislature. That CDC leadership subsequently confirmed in a press conference the next day that UDC and CDC would not stand together in the 2015 Catalan regional election, and that the political project of the CiU federation was over, signalling the end of 37 years of cooperation between both parties.

Later in July 2015, a pro-independence faction within UDC—including historical members Antoni Castellà, Núria de Gispert, Rosa Maria Carrasco Azemar and Joan Rigol—broke away from the party to found the Democrats of Catalonia (DC), and by August the new DC party claimed to have taken away 1,600 UDC volunteers, 23 out of the 43 UDC city mayors and 118 out of UDC's 191 city councillors. In the regional election held on 27 September, UDC would fall short of the 3% threshold to secure parliamentary representation, meaning the party was to be expelled from the Parliament of Catalonia for the first time since 1980. The party would also fail in its attempt to maintain its presence in the Cortes Generales in the 2015 Spanish general election, with party's spokesman Josep Antoni Duran i Lleida losing his seat.

On 24 March 2017, UDC was dissolved by its last secretary general, Ramon Espadaler, because of mounting economic debts and the lack of public funding resulting from UDC's various election defeats bringing the party to bankruptcy. Some of its former members, including Espalader, founded a new catalanist political party called United to Advance, which eventually joined an electoral alliance with the Socialists' Party of Catalonia (PSC) in order to contest the 2017 Catalan regional election.

== Electoral performance ==
=== Parliament of Catalonia ===
Parliament of Catalonia
Election	Votes	%	#	Seats	+/–	Leading candidate	Status in legislature
1980	Within CiU			8 / 135	—	Jordi Pujol	Minority
1984	Within CiU			16 / 135	8	Jordi Pujol	Coalition (CiU–ERC)
1984	Within CiU			16 / 135	8	Jordi Pujol	Majority (from Feb. 1987)
1988	Within CiU			15 / 135	1	Jordi Pujol	Majority
1992	Within CiU			16 / 135	1	Jordi Pujol	Majority
1995	Within CiU			14 / 135	2	Jordi Pujol	Minority
1999	Within CiU			13 / 135	1	Jordi Pujol	Minority
2003	Within CiU			13 / 135	0	Artur Mas	Opposition
2006	Within CiU			14 / 135	1	Artur Mas	Opposition
2010	Within CiU			17 / 135	3	Artur Mas	Minority
2012	Within CiU			13 / 135	4	Artur Mas	Minority (CDC–UDC)
2012	Within CiU			13 / 135	4	Artur Mas	Minority (CDC; from Jun. 2015)
2015	103,293	2.51%	7th	0 / 135	13	Ramon Espadaler	No seats

=== Cortes Generales ===
==== Nationwide ====
Cortes Generales
Election	Congress					Senate		Leading candidate	Status in legislature
Election	Votes	%	#	Seats	+/–	Seats	+/–	Leading candidate	Status in legislature
1977	Within UCiDCC/DiC			1 / 350	—	0 / 207	—	Joaquín Ruiz-Giménez	Opposition
1979	Within CiU			1 / 350	0	0 / 208	0	Jordi Pujol	Opposition
1982	Within CiU/CatSen			3 / 350	2	1 / 208	1	Miquel Roca	Opposition
1986	Within CiU			5 / 350	2	1 / 208	0	Miquel Roca	Opposition
1989	Within CiU			5 / 350	0	2 / 208	1	Miquel Roca	Opposition
1993	Within CiU			5 / 350	0	3 / 208	1	Miquel Roca	Confidence and supply
1996	Within CiU			5 / 350	0	2 / 208	1	Joaquim Molins	Confidence and supply
2000	Within CiU			4 / 350	1	2 / 208	0	Xavier Trias	Opposition
2004	Within CiU			4 / 350	0	0 / 208	2	Josep Antoni Duran i Lleida	Opposition
2008	Within CiU			4 / 350	0	0 / 208	0	Josep Antoni Duran i Lleida	Opposition
2011	Within CiU			6 / 350	2	2 / 208	2	Josep Antoni Duran i Lleida	Opposition
2015	65,388	0.26%	14th	0 / 350	6	0 / 208	2	Josep Antoni Duran i Lleida	No seats

==== Regional breakdown ====
Election	Catalonia						
Election	Congress					Senate	
Election	Votes	%	#	Seats	+/–	Seats	+/–
1977	Within UCiDCC/DiC			1 / 47	—	0 / 16	—
1979	Within CiU			1 / 47	0	0 / 16	0
1982	Within CiU/CatSen			3 / 47	2	1 / 16	1
1986	Within CiU			5 / 47	2	1 / 16	0
1989	Within CiU			5 / 46	0	2 / 16	1
1993	Within CiU			5 / 47	0	3 / 16	1
1996	Within CiU			5 / 46	0	2 / 16	1
2000	Within CiU			4 / 46	1	2 / 16	0
2004	Within CiU			4 / 47	0	0 / 16	2
2008	Within CiU			4 / 47	0	0 / 16	0
2011	Within CiU			6 / 47	2	2 / 16	2
2015	65,388	1.74%	7th	0 / 47	6	0 / 16	2

=== European Parliament ===
European Parliament
Election	Total				
Election	Votes	%	#	Seats	+/–
1987	Within CiU			1 / 60	—
1989	Within CiU			1 / 60	0
1994	Within CiU			1 / 64	0
1999	Within CiU			1 / 64	0
2004	Within CiU (Galeusca)			0 / 54	1
2009	Within CiU (CEU)			1 / 54	1
2014	Within CiU (CEU)			1 / 54	0
