= Results of the 1979 Spanish Congress election =

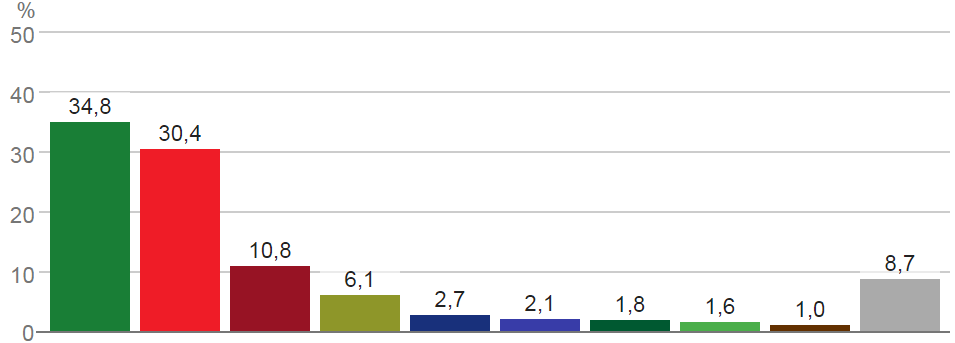
(Spain)	Main: 1979 Spanish general election
← 1977 1 March 1979 1982 →
Party		Votes	%	Seats
	UCD	6,268,593	34.8%	168
	PSOE	5,469,813	30.4%	121
	PCE	1,938,487	10.8%	23
	CD	1,094,438	6.1%	9
	CiU	483,353	2.7%	8
	UN	378,964	2.1%	1
	PSA–PA	325,842	1.8%	5
	EAJ/PNV	296,597	1.6%	7
	HB	172,110	1.0%	3
	Others	1,562,718	8.7%	5
Total		17,990,915	100.0%	350

This article presents the results breakdown of the election to the Congress of Deputies held in Spain on 1 March 1979. The following tables show detailed results in each of the country's 17 autonomous communities and in the autonomous cities of Ceuta and Melilla, as well as a summary of constituency and regional results. (Note: This territorial division is based on the autonomic system established under the Spanish Constitution of 1978, as opposed to the regional division established in 1833. Most autonomous communities would be constituted by the time of the 1982 election, with the rest being established in early 1983. The autonomous cities of Ceuta and Melilla would not be constituted as independent administrative entities until 1995.)

== Nationwide ==
← Summary of the 1 March 1979 Congress of Deputies election results →
Parties and alliances	Popular vote			Seats	
Parties and alliances	Votes	%	±pp	Total	+/−
Union of the Democratic Centre (UCD)	6,268,593	34.84	+0.40	168	+3
Spanish Socialist Workers' Party (PSOE)^{1}	5,469,813	30.40	−3.44	121	−3
Communist Party of Spain (PCE)	1,938,487	10.77	+1.44	23	+3
Democratic Coalition (CD)	1,094,438	6.08	−2.33	9	−7
Democratic Coalition (CD)^{2}	1,060,330	5.89	−2.05	9	−6
Foral Union of the Basque Country (UFPV)^{3}	34,108	0.19	−0.29	0	−1
Convergence and Union (CiU)^{4}	483,353	2.69	−1.06	8	−5
National Union (UN)^{5}	378,964	2.11	+1.54	1	+1
Socialist Party of Andalusia–Andalusian Party (PSA–PA)	325,842	1.81	New	5	+5
Basque Nationalist Party (EAJ/PNV)	296,597	1.65	+0.03	7	−1
Party of Labour of Spain (PTE)^{6}	192,798	1.07	+0.40	0	±0
Popular Unity (HB)^{7}	172,110	0.96	+0.72	3	+3
Workers' Revolutionary Organization (ORT)	138,487	0.77	+0.22	0	±0
Workers' Revolutionary Organization (ORT)^{8}	127,517	0.71	+0.29	0	±0
Navarrese Left Union (UNAI)	10,970	0.06	−0.07	0	±0
Spanish Socialist Workers' Party (historical) (PSOEh)^{9}	133,869	0.74	+0.05	0	±0
Republican Left of Catalonia–National Front of Catalonia (ERC–FNC)^{10}	123,452	0.69	−0.10	1	±0
Basque Country Left (EE)	85,677	0.48	+0.14	1	±0
Communist Movement–Organization of Communist Left (MC–OIC)	84,856	0.47	+0.28	0	±0
Galician National-Popular Bloc (BNPG)	60,889	0.34	+0.22	0	±0
Canarian People's Union (UPC)	58,953	0.33	New	1	+1
Left Bloc for National Liberation (BEAN)	56,582	0.31	New	0	±0
Galician Unity (PG–POG–PSG)^{11}	55,555	0.31	+0.16	0	±0
Republican Left (IR)	55,384	0.31	New	0	±0
Carlist Party (PC)	50,552	0.28	+0.23	0	±0
Communist Organization–Communist Unification (OCEBR–UCE)	47,937	0.27	New	0	±0
Workers' Communist Party (PCT)	47,896	0.27	New	0	±0
Regionalist Aragonese Party (PAR)^{12}	38,042	0.21	+0.01	1	±0
Revolutionary Communist League (LCR)^{13}	36,662	0.20	−0.02	0	±0
Spanish Phalanx of the CNSO (Authentic) (FE–JONS(A))	30,252	0.17	−0.08	0	±0
Navarrese People's Union (UPN)	28,248	0.16	New	1	+1
Coalition for Aragon (PSAr–PSDA)	19,220	0.11	New	0	±0
Nationalist Party of Castile and León (PANCAL)	16,016	0.09	New	0	±0
Liberal Party (PL)	15,774	0.09	New	0	±0
Valencian Regional Union (URV)	15,694	0.09	New	0	±0
Nationalist Party of the Valencian Country (PNPV)	13,828	0.08	New	0	±0
Spanish Ruralist Party (PRE)	10,324	0.06	New	0	±0
Party of the Canarian Country (PPC)	10,099	0.06	New	0	±0
Socialists of Mallorca and Menorca (SMiM)	10,022	0.06	New	0	±0
Syndicalist Party (PSIN)	9,777	0.05	New	0	±0
Union for the Freedom of Speech (ULE)	7,126	0.04	New	0	±0
Catalan State (EC)	6,328	0.04	New	0	±0
Cantonal Party (PCAN)	6,290	0.03	New	0	±0
Independent Candidacy of the Countryside (CIC)	6,115	0.03	New	0	±0
Social Christian Democracy of Catalonia (DSCC)	4,976	0.03	−0.02	0	±0
Proverist Party (PPr)	4,939	0.03	±0.00	0	±0
Spanish Democratic Republican Action (ARDE)	4,826	0.03	New	0	±0
Communist League (LC)	3,614	0.02	New	0	±0
Asturian Nationalist Council (CNA)	3,049	0.02	New	0	±0
Authentic Spanish Phalanx (FEA)	2,736	0.02	New	0	±0
Pro-Austerity Policy Political Party (PIPPA)	2,409	0.01	New	0	±0
Workers and Peasants Party (POC)	2,314	0.01	New	0	±0
Independent Candidates of Melilla (CIME)	1,820	0.01	New	0	±0
Falangist Unity–Independent Spanish Phalanx (UF–FI–AT)	1,188	0.01	New	0	±0
Spanish Phalanx–Falangist Unity (FE–UF)	876	0.00	New	0	±0
Centre Independent Candidacy (CIC)	n/a	n/a	−0.16	0	−1
Blank ballots	57,267	0.32	+0.07		
Total	17,990,915			350	±0
Valid votes	17,990,915	98.53	−0.04		
Invalid votes	268,277	1.47	+0.04		
Votes cast / turnout	18,259,192	68.04	−10.79		
Abstentions	8,577,298	31.96	+10.79		
Registered voters	26,836,490				
Sources
Footnotes: ^{1} Spanish Socialist Workers' Party results are compared to the combined totals of Spanish Socialist Workers' Party and People's Socialist Party–Socialist Unity in the 1977 election.; ^{2} Democratic Coalition results are compared to People's Alliance totals in the 1977 election, not including results in the Basque Country.; ^{3} Foral Union of the Basque Country results are compared to the combined totals of People's Alliance in the Basque Country and Basque Independent Democrats in the 1977 election.; ^{4} Convergence and Union results are compared to the combined totals of Democratic Pact for Catalonia and Union of the Centre and Christian Democracy of Catalonia in the 1977 election.; ^{5} National Union results are compared to the combined totals of National Alliance July 18 and José Antonio Circles in the 1977 election.; ^{6} Party of Labour of Spain results are compared to Democratic Left Front totals in the 1977 election.; ^{7} Popular Unity results are compared to the combined totals of the Basque Socialist Party and Basque Nationalist Action in the 1977 election.; ^{8} Workers' Revolutionary Organization results are compared to Workers' Electoral Group totals in the 1977 election.; ^{9} Spanish Socialist Workers' Party (historical) results are compared to Democratic Socialist Alliance totals in the 1977 election.; ^{10} Republican Left of Catalonia–National Front of Catalonia results are compared to Left of Catalonia–Democratic Electoral Front totals in the 1977 election.; ^{11} Galician Unity results are compared to Galician Socialist Party totals in the 1977 election.; ^{12} Regionalist Aragonese Party results are compared to Centre Independent Aragonese Candidacy totals in the 1977 election.; ^{13} Revolutionary Communist League results are compared to Front for Workers' Unity totals in the 1977 election.

== Summary ==
=== Constituencies ===

Summary of constituency results in the 1 March 1979 Congress of Deputies election
Constituency	UCD		PSOE		PCE		CD		CiU		UN		PSA–PA		PNV		HB		ERC–FN		EE		UPC		PAR		UPN	
Constituency	%	S	%	S	%	S	%	S	%	S	%	S	%	S	%	S	%	S	%	S	%	S	%	S	%	S	%	S
Álava	25.4	2	21.3	1	3.3	−	6.2	−			0.9	−			22.9	1	9.9	−			4.7	−						
Albacete	39.0	2	38.7	2	12.4	−	4.9	−			2.2	−																
Alicante	37.5	4	39.4	4	11.2	1	5.2	−			1.9	−																
Almería	44.2	3	37.1	2	7.4	−	4.4	−			1.7	−	2.8	−														
Ávila	65.8	3	20.0	−	3.6	−	6.9	−			1.6	−																
Badajoz	44.6	4	37.3	3	9.4	−	3.4	−			1.9	−																
Balearics	48.9	4	29.4	2	4.9	−	9.2	−			1.1	−																
Barcelona	16.9	6	30.3	12	19.0	7	3.7	1	15.8	6	0.9	−							3.9	1								
Biscay	16.0	2	19.1	2	5.8	−	4.2	−			1.4	−			29.2	4	14.5	2			5.8	−						
Burgos	52.9	3	23.0	1	4.0	−	8.2	−			3.8	−																
Cáceres	47.1	3	38.0	2	5.2	−	4.1	−			2.7	−																
Cádiz	29.4	2	30.1	3	10.6	1	3.3	−			1.1	−	19.7	2														
Castellón	46.3	3	35.7	2	7.2	−	3.5	−			2.1	−																
Ceuta	51.9	1	35.3	−			7.9	−			3.5	−																
Ciudad Real	41.4	3	39.4	2	7.9	−	4.8	−			4.1	−																
Córdoba	29.9	3	30.1	3	19.1	1	5.7	−			2.0	−	10.0	−														
Cuenca	52.4	3	31.5	1	8.2	−	6.0	−																				
Gerona	24.9	2	28.0	2	9.4	−	3.4	−	24.8	1	1.0	−							4.2	−								
Granada	36.6	3	35.7	3	12.7	1	4.7	−			1.2	−	6.2	−														
Guadalajara	46.9	2	23.4	1	8.6	−	10.9	−			6.6	−																
Guipúzcoa	15.4	1	18.2	2	3.1	−	1.0	−			0.7	−			26.5	2	17.6	1			12.9	1						
Huelva	37.3	3	35.4	2	7.0	−	3.3	−			1.6	−	9.6	−														
Huesca	47.9	2	34.7	1	6.6	−	4.5	−			0.8	−																
Jaén	33.8	3	41.9	3	12.9	1	3.6	−			2.8	−	3.4	−														
La Coruña	46.6	6	17.9	2	4.7	−	11.8	1			1.0	−																
Las Palmas	59.7	4	14.5	1	2.9	−	3.0	−			0.8	−											13.3	1				
León	50.1	4	27.8	2	5.9	−	11.4	−			1.2	−																
Lérida	31.7	2	24.9	1	10.7	−	3.2	−	15.9	1	1.1	−							7.7	−								
Logroño	48.0	3	29.1	1	3.6	−	13.9	−			1.2	−																
Lugo	50.1	3	17.5	1	1.5	−	19.3	1			0.5	−																
Madrid	33.1	12	33.3	12	13.5	4	8.6	3			4.8	1									0.1	−						
Málaga	29.1	3	35.9	3	12.8	1	3.9	−			1.8	−	12.0	1														
Melilla	51.6	1	21.4	−	4.5	−	4.8	−			2.4	−																
Murcia	39.1	4	39.2	4	7.9	−	5.7	−			1.5	−																
Navarre	32.9	3	21.9	1	2.2	−									8.4	−	8.9	−									11.2	1
Orense	52.5	3	16.2	1	2.7	−	18.8	1																				
Oviedo	33.0	4	37.3	4	13.7	1	8.6	1			2.1	−																
Palencia	51.4	2	26.1	1	4.5	−	9.4	−			3.8	−																
Pontevedra	47.3	5	16.9	2	5.5	−	12.7	1			0.9	−																
Salamanca	53.5	3	26.6	1	4.0	−	7.7	−			1.0	−																
Santa Cruz de Tenerife	56.8	5	21.8	2	4.7	−	4.5	−			1.4	−											8.4	−				
Santander	41.9	3	30.3	2	6.6	−	10.3	−			3.9	−																
Segovia	59.3	2	23.1	1	4.1	−	6.6	−			1.1	−																
Seville	27.6	4	29.4	4	16.0	2	4.7	−			1.3	−	14.7	2														
Soria	57.2	2	25.6	1	2.8	−	10.0	−			1.2	−																
Tarragona	28.2	2	28.8	2	14.2	1	4.0	−	14.0	−	0.9	−							4.6	−								
Teruel	55.5	2	27.1	1	3.2	−	8.3	−			2.4	−																
Toledo	41.7	3	32.1	2	10.9	−	5.6	−			7.3	−																
Valencia	33.8	6	36.6	7	13.5	2	4.4	−			2.5	−																
Valladolid	38.0	3	29.1	2	7.4	−	8.1	−			3.6	−																
Zamora	50.6	3	22.5	1	2.9	−	16.2	−			1.7	−																
Zaragoza	36.1	4	26.7	3	8.0	−	5.4	−			1.8	−													9.0	1		
Total	34.8	168	30.4	121	10.8	23	6.1	9	2.7	8	2.1	1	1.8	5	1.6	7	1.0	3	0.7	1	0.5	1	0.3	1	0.2	1	0.2	1

=== Regions ===

Summary of regional results in the 1 March 1979 Congress of Deputies election
Region	UCD		PSOE		PCE		CD		CiU		UN		PSA–PA		PNV		HB		ERC–FN		EE		UPC		PAR		UPN	
Region	%	S	%	S	%	S	%	S	%	S	%	S	%	S	%	S	%	S	%	S	%	S	%	S	%	S	%	S
Andalusia	31.8	24	33.5	23	13.3	7	4.3	−			1.6	−	11.1	5														
Aragon	40.9	8	28.3	5	7.1	−	5.6	−			1.7	−													6.1	1		
Asturias	33.0	4	37.3	4	13.7	1	8.6	1			2.1	−																
Balearics	48.9	4	29.4	2	4.9	−	9.2	−			1.1	−																
Basque Country	16.9	5	19.0	5	4.6	−	3.4	−			1.1	−			27.6	7	15.0	3			8.0	1						
Canary Islands	58.4	9	17.8	3	3.7	−	3.7	−			1.1	−											11.0	1				
Cantabria	41.9	3	30.3	2	6.6	−	10.3	−			3.9	−																
Castile and León	51.0	25	25.6	10	4.9	−	9.4	−			2.2	−																
Castilla–La Mancha	43.0	13	34.5	8	9.8	−	5.8	−			4.4	−																
Catalonia	19.3	12	29.7	17	17.4	8	3.6	1	16.4	8	0.9	−							4.2	1								
Ceuta	51.9	1	35.3	−			7.9	−			3.5	−																
Extremadura	45.6	7	37.6	5	7.8	−	3.7	−			2.2	−																
Galicia	48.2	17	17.3	6	4.2	−	14.2	4			0.8	−																
La Rioja	48.0	3	29.1	1	3.6	−	13.9	−			1.2	−																
Madrid	33.1	12	33.3	12	13.5	4	8.6	3			4.8	1									0.1	−						
Melilla	51.6	1	21.4	−	4.5	−	4.8	−			2.4	−																
Murcia	39.1	4	39.2	4	7.9	−	5.7	−			1.5	−																
Navarre	32.9	3	21.9	1	2.2	−									8.4	−	8.9	−									11.2	1
Valencian Community	36.5	13	37.3	13	12.0	3	4.5	−			2.3	−																
Total	34.8	168	30.4	121	10.8	23	6.1	9	2.7	8	2.1	1	1.8	5	1.6	7	1.0	3	0.7	1	0.5	1	0.3	1	0.2	1	0.2	1

== Autonomous communities ==
=== Andalusia ===
← Summary of the 1 March 1979 Congress of Deputies election results in Andalusia →
Parties and alliances	Popular vote			Seats	
Parties and alliances	Votes	%	±pp	Total	+/−
Spanish Socialist Workers' Party (PSOE)^{1}	986,842	33.53	−7.36	23	−5
Union of the Democratic Centre (UCD)	935,760	31.79	−2.58	24	−2
Communist Party of Spain (PCE)	392,442	13.33	+2.05	7	+2
Socialist Party of Andalusia–Andalusian Party (PSA–PA)	325,842	11.07	New	5	+5
Democratic Coalition (CD)^{2}	125,963	4.28	−2.79	0	±0
Party of Labour of Spain (PTE)^{3}	58,139	1.98	+0.40	0	±0
National Union (UN)^{4}	48,310	1.64	+1.37	0	±0
Spanish Socialist Workers' Party (historical) (PSOEh)^{5}	18,454	0.63	+0.16	0	±0
Workers' Revolutionary Organization (ORT)^{6}	8,462	0.29	+0.13	0	±0
Communist Movement–Organization of Communist Left (MC–OIC)^{7}	7,387	0.25	+0.24	0	±0
Communist Organization of Spain (Red Flag) (OCE–BR)	6,556	0.22	New	0	±0
Workers' Communist Party (PCT)	5,518	0.19	New	0	±0
Republican Left (IR)	4,229	0.14	New	0	±0
Communist Unification of Spain (UCE)	3,046	0.10	New	0	±0
Revolutionary Communist League (LCR)^{8}	2,689	0.09	+0.03	0	±0
Spanish Phalanx of the CNSO (Authentic) (FE–JONS(A))	2,483	0.08	−0.05	0	±0
Carlist Party (PC)	1,820	0.06	New	0	±0
Liberal Party (PL)	1,484	0.05	New	0	±0
Workers and Peasants Party (POC)	1,404	0.05	New	0	±0
Spanish Democratic Republican Action (ARDE)	707	0.02	New	0	±0
Union for the Freedom of Speech (ULE)	641	0.02	New	0	±0
Proverist Party (PPr)	443	0.02	New	0	±0
Blank ballots	4,957	0.17	−0.05		
Total	2,943,578			59	±0
Valid votes	2,943,578	98.86	+0.07		
Invalid votes	34,081	1.14	−0.07		
Votes cast / turnout	2,977,659	68.65	−9.83		
Abstentions	1,359,498	31.35	+9.83		
Registered voters	4,337,157				
Sources
Footnotes: ^{1} Spanish Socialist Workers' Party results are compared to the combined totals of Spanish Socialist Workers' Party and People's Socialist Party–Socialist Unity in the 1977 election.; ^{2} Democratic Coalition results are compared to People's Alliance totals in the 1977 election.; ^{3} Party of Labour of Spain results are compared to Democratic Left Front totals in the 1977 election.; ^{4} National Union results are compared to the combined totals of National Alliance July 18, Spanish Phalanx of the CNSO and José Antonio Circles in the 1977 election.; ^{5} Spanish Socialist Workers' Party (historical) results are compared to Democratic Socialist Alliance totals in the 1977 election.; ^{6} Workers' Revolutionary Organization results are compared to Workers' Electoral Group totals in the 1977 election.; ^{7} Communist Movement–Organization of Communist Left results are compared to Left Andalusian Bloc totals in the 1977 election.; ^{8} Revolutionary Communist League results are compared to Front for Workers' Unity totals in the 1977 election.

=== Aragon ===
← Summary of the 1 March 1979 Congress of Deputies election results in Aragon →
Parties and alliances	Popular vote			Seats	
Parties and alliances	Votes	%	±pp	Total	+/−
Union of the Democratic Centre (UCD)	256,681	40.95	+3.95	8	+1
Spanish Socialist Workers' Party (PSOE)^{1}	177,371	28.30	−6.24	5	−1
Communist Party of Spain (PCE)	44,461	7.09	+2.14	0	±0
Regionalist Aragonese Party (PAR)^{2}	38,042	6.07	+0.37	1	±0
Democratic Coalition (CD)^{3}	35,220	5.62	−3.16	0	±0
Party of Labour of Spain (PTE)^{4}	21,023	3.35	+1.88	0	±0
Coalition for Aragon (PSAr–PSDA)	19,220	3.07	New	0	±0
National Union (UN)^{5}	10,743	1.71	+1.30	0	±0
Spanish Socialist Workers' Party (historical) (PSOEh)	5,039	0.80	−1.09	0	±0
Communist Movement–Organization of Communist Left (MC–OIC)^{6}	3,656	0.58	−0.15	0	±0
Republican Left (IR)	3,640	0.58	New	0	±0
Workers' Revolutionary Organization (ORT)^{7}	2,846	0.45	+0.19	0	±0
Workers' Communist Party (PCT)	1,738	0.28	New	0	±0
Carlist Party (PC)	1,235	0.20	New	0	±0
Spanish Phalanx of the CNSO (Authentic) (FE–JONS(A))	1,155	0.18	−0.12	0	±0
Communist Organization of Spain (Red Flag) (OCE–BR)	1,155	0.18	New	0	±0
Revolutionary Communist League (LCR)	1,093	0.17	New	0	±0
Blank ballots	2,545	0.41	+0.03		
Total	626,863			14	±0
Valid votes	626,863	98.47	+0.13		
Invalid votes	9,743	1.53	−0.13		
Votes cast / turnout	636,606	70.75	−10.82		
Abstentions	263,155	29.25	+10.82		
Registered voters	899,761				
Sources
Footnotes: ^{1} Spanish Socialist Workers' Party results are compared to the combined totals of Spanish Socialist Workers' Party and People's Socialist Party–Socialist Unity in the 1977 election.; ^{2} Regionalist Aragonese Party results are compared to Centre Independent Aragonese Candidacy totals in the 1977 election.; ^{3} Democratic Coalition results are compared to People's Alliance totals in the 1977 election.; ^{4} Party of Labour of Spain results are compared to Democratic Left Front totals in the 1977 election.; ^{5} National Union results are compared to the combined totals of National Alliance July 18 and José Antonio Circles in the 1977 election.; ^{6} Communist Movement–Organization of Communist Left results are compared to Aragonese Autonomist Front totals in the 1977 election.; ^{7} Workers' Revolutionary Organization results are compared to Workers' Electoral Group totals in the 1977 election.

=== Asturias ===
← Summary of the 1 March 1979 Congress of Deputies election results in Asturias →
Parties and alliances	Popular vote			Seats	
Parties and alliances	Votes	%	±pp	Total	+/−
Spanish Socialist Workers' Party (PSOE)^{1}	200,346	37.28	−1.54	4	±0
Union of the Democratic Centre (UCD)	177,459	33.02	+2.15	4	±0
Communist Party of Spain (PCE)	73,744	13.72	+3.25	1	±0
Democratic Coalition (CD)^{2}	46,365	8.63	−4.90	1	±0
National Union (UN)^{3}	11,178	2.08	+1.74	0	±0
Communist Movement–Organization of Communist Left (MC–OIC)^{4}	6,003	1.12	−0.76	0	±0
Workers' Communist Party (PCT)	3,102	0.58	New	0	±0
Spanish Socialist Workers' Party (historical) (PSOEh)^{5}	3,101	0.58	−0.45	0	±0
Asturian Nationalist Council (CNA)	3,049	0.57	New	0	±0
Workers' Revolutionary Organization (ORT)^{6}	2,518	0.47	−0.01	0	±0
Republican Left (IR)	1,740	0.32	New	0	±0
Spanish Phalanx of the CNSO (Authentic) (FE–JONS(A))	1,623	0.30	−0.15	0	±0
Party of Labour of Spain (PTE)	1,489	0.28	New	0	±0
Revolutionary Communist League (LCR)^{7}	1,312	0.24	−0.02	0	±0
Falangist Unity–Independent Spanish Phalanx (UF–FI–AT)	1,188	0.22	New	0	±0
Communist Unification of Spain (UCE)	1,149	0.21	New	0	±0
Union for the Freedom of Speech (ULE)	802	0.15	New	0	±0
Blank ballots	1,196	0.22	+0.04		
Total	537,364			10	±0
Valid votes	537,364	98.57	−0.07		
Invalid votes	7,815	1.43	+0.07		
Votes cast / turnout	545,179	62.74	−11.83		
Abstentions	323,714	37.26	+11.83		
Registered voters	868,893				
Sources
Footnotes: ^{1} Spanish Socialist Workers' Party results are compared to the combined totals of Spanish Socialist Workers' Party and People's Socialist Party–Socialist Unity in the 1977 election.; ^{2} Democratic Coalition results are compared to People's Alliance totals in the 1977 election.; ^{3} National Union results are compared to National Alliance July 18 totals in the 1977 election.; ^{4} Communist Movement–Organization of Communist Left results are compared to Regionalist Unity totals in the 1977 election.; ^{5} Spanish Socialist Workers' Party (historical) results are compared to Democratic Socialist Alliance totals in the 1977 election.; ^{6} Workers' Revolutionary Organization results are compared to Workers' Electoral Group totals in the 1977 election.; ^{7} Revolutionary Communist League results are compared to Front for Workers' Unity totals in the 1977 election.

=== Balearics ===
← Summary of the 1 March 1979 Congress of Deputies election results in the Balearics →
Parties and alliances	Popular vote			Seats	
Parties and alliances	Votes	%	±pp	Total	+/−
Union of the Democratic Centre (UCD)	146,927	48.92	−2.97	4	±0
Spanish Socialist Workers' Party (PSOE)^{1}	88,232	29.38	+0.89	2	±0
Democratic Coalition (CD)^{2}	27,554	9.17	+0.14	0	±0
Communist Party of Spain (PCE)	14,757	4.91	+0.45	0	±0
Socialists of Mallorca and Menorca (SMiM)	10,022	3.34	New	0	±0
National Union (UN)^{3}	3,165	1.05	+0.86	0	±0
Party of Labour of Spain (PTE)	1,793	0.60	New	0	±0
Workers' Communist Party (PCT)	1,544	0.51	New	0	±0
Carlist Party (PC)	1,257	0.42	New	0	±0
Communist Movement–Organization of Communist Left (MC–OIC)	1,179	0.39	New	0	±0
Workers' Revolutionary Organization (ORT)^{4}	1,070	0.36	+0.15	0	±0
Revolutionary Communist League (LCR)	893	0.30	New	0	±0
Union for the Freedom of Speech (ULE)	804	0.27	New	0	±0
Blank ballots	1,134	0.38	−0.04		
Total	300,331			6	±0
Valid votes	300,331	95.39	−2.62		
Invalid votes	14,519	4.61	+2.62		
Votes cast / turnout	314,850	69.65	−9.18		
Abstentions	137,211	30.35	+9.18		
Registered voters	452,061				
Sources
Footnotes: ^{1} Spanish Socialist Workers' Party results are compared to the combined totals of Spanish Socialist Workers' Party and People's Socialist Party–Socialist Unity in the 1977 election.; ^{2} Democratic Coalition results are compared to People's Alliance totals in the 1977 election.; ^{3} National Union results are compared to José Antonio Circles totals in the 1977 election.; ^{4} Workers' Revolutionary Organization are compared to Workers' Electoral Group totals in the 1977 election.

=== Basque Country ===
← Summary of the 1 March 1979 Congress of Deputies election results in the Basque Country →
Parties and alliances	Popular vote			Seats	
Parties and alliances	Votes	%	±pp	Total	+/−
Basque Nationalist Party (EAJ/PNV)	275,292	27.57	−1.71	7	−1
Socialist Party of the Basque Country (PSE–PSOE)^{1}	190,235	19.05	−9.26	5	−2
Union of the Democratic Centre (UCD)	168,607	16.88	+4.07	5	+1
Popular Unity (HB)^{2}	149,685	14.99	+10.79	3	+3
Basque Country Left (EE)	80,098	8.02	+1.95	1	±0
Communist Party of the Basque Country (PCE/EPK)	45,853	4.59	+0.05	0	±0
Foral Union of the Basque Country (UFPV)^{3}	34,108	3.42	−5.22	0	−1
Communist Movement–Organization of Communist Left (MC–OIC)	13,292	1.33	New	0	±0
National Union (UN)	10,979	1.10	New	0	±0
Workers' Revolutionary Organization (ORT)^{4}	6,915	0.69	+0.17	0	±0
Carlist Party (PC)	6,476	0.65	New	0	±0
Revolutionary Communist League (LCR)^{5}	5,640	0.56	−0.26	0	±0
Spanish Socialist Workers' Party (historical) (PSOEh)^{6}	4,814	0.48	−0.46	0	±0
Republican Left of the Basque Country (IR–E)	1,727	0.17	New	0	±0
Spanish Phalanx of the CNSO (Authentic) (FE–JONS(A))	1,082	0.11	New	0	±0
Party of Labour of Spain (PTE)^{7}	777	0.08	−0.38	0	±0
Proverist Party (PPr)	699	0.07	+0.05	0	±0
Workers' Communist Party (PCT)	7	0.00	New	0	±0
Union for the Freedom of Speech (ULE)	0	0.00	New	0	±0
Blank ballots	2,369	0.24	−0.01		
Total	998,655			21	±0
Valid votes	998,655	97.85	+0.10		
Invalid votes	21,895	2.15	−0.10		
Votes cast / turnout	1,020,550	65.95	−11.28		
Abstentions	526,922	34.05	+11.28		
Registered voters	1,547,472				
Sources
Footnotes: ^{1} Socialist Party of the Basque Country results are compared to the combined totals of the Socialist Party of the Basque Country and People's Socialist Party–Socialist Unity in the 1977 election.; ^{2} Popular Unity results are compared to the combined totals of the Basque Socialist Party and Basque Nationalist Action in the 1977 election.; ^{3} Foral Union of the Basque Country results are compared to the combined totals of People's Alliance and Basque Independent Democrats in the 1977 election.; ^{4} Workers' Revolutionary Organization results are compared to Workers' Electoral Group totals in the 1977 election.; ^{5} Revolutionary Communist League results are compared to Front for Workers' Unity totals in the 1977 election.; ^{6} Spanish Socialist Workers' Party (historical) results are compared to Democratic Socialist Alliance totals in the 1977 election.; ^{7} Party of Labour of Spain results are compared to Democratic Left Front totals in the 1977 election.

=== Canary Islands ===
← Summary of the 1 March 1979 Congress of Deputies election results in the Canary Islands →
Parties and alliances	Popular vote			Seats	
Parties and alliances	Votes	%	±pp	Total	+/−
Union of the Democratic Centre (UCD)	311,750	58.36	−1.49	9	−1
Spanish Socialist Workers' Party (PSOE)^{1}	95,220	17.82	−2.63	3	±0
Canarian People's Union (UPC)	58,953	11.04	New	1	+1
Democratic Coalition (CD)^{2}	19,811	3.71	−4.29	0	±0
Communist Party of the Canaries (PCC–PCE)	19,805	3.71	+0.40	0	±0
Party of the Canarian Country (PPC)	10,099	1.89	New	0	±0
National Union (UN)	5,700	1.07	New	0	±0
Workers' Revolutionary Organization (ORT)	2,961	0.55	New	0	±0
Party of Labour of Spain (PTE)^{3}	2,959	0.55	+0.28	0	±0
Revolutionary Communist League (LCR)	1,867	0.35	New	0	±0
Carlist Party (PC)	1,626	0.30	New	0	±0
Republican Left (IR)	1,019	0.19	New	0	±0
Union for the Freedom of Speech (ULE)	736	0.14	New	0	±0
Blank ballots	1,693	0.32	+0.01		
Total	534,199			13	±0
Valid votes	534,199	97.53	−0.62		
Invalid votes	13,524	2.47	+0.62		
Votes cast / turnout	547,723	61.14	−11.94		
Abstentions	348,121	38.86	+11.94		
Registered voters	895,844				
Sources
Footnotes: ^{1} Spanish Socialist Workers' Party results are compared to the combined totals of Spanish Socialist Workers' Party and People's Socialist Party–Socialist Unity in the 1977 election.; ^{2} Democratic Coalition results are compared to People's Alliance totals in the 1977 election.; ^{3} Party of Labour of Spain results are compared to Democratic Left Front totals in the 1977 election.

=== Cantabria ===
← Summary of the 1 March 1979 Congress of Deputies election results in Cantabria →
Parties and alliances	Popular vote			Seats	
Parties and alliances	Votes	%	±pp	Total	+/−
Union of the Democratic Centre (UCD)	108,552	41.86	+1.80	3	±0
Spanish Socialist Workers' Party (PSOE)^{1}	78,512	30.28	+1.21	2	+1
Right Independent Group (AID)^{2}	26,707	10.30	−3.97	0	−1
Communist Party of Spain (PCE)	17,140	6.61	+1.16	0	±0
National Union (UN)^{3}	10,106	3.90	+2.50	0	±0
Party of Labour of Spain (PTE)^{4}	4,014	1.55	+0.91	0	±0
Spanish Socialist Workers' Party (historical) (PSOEh)	3,735	1.44	−2.04	0	±0
Workers' Revolutionary Organization (ORT)^{5}	3,267	1.26	+0.27	0	±0
Spanish Phalanx of the CNSO (Authentic) (FE–JONS(A))	1,387	0.53	−0.08	0	±0
Carlist Party (PC)	1,013	0.39	New	0	±0
Communist Movement–Organization of Communist Left (MC–OIC)	872	0.34	New	0	±0
Communist Organization of Spain (Red Flag) (OCE–BR)	772	0.30	New	0	±0
Revolutionary Communist League (LCR)	752	0.29	New	0	±0
Spanish Phalanx–Falangist Unity (FE–UF)	660	0.25	New	0	±0
Republican Left (IR)	643	0.25	New	0	±0
Blank ballots	1,175	0.45	+0.30		
Total	259,307			5	±0
Valid votes	259,307	97.98	+0.86		
Invalid votes	5,351	2.02	−0.86		
Votes cast / turnout	264,658	70.45	−10.28		
Abstentions	111,008	29.55	+10.28		
Registered voters	375,666				
Sources
Footnotes: ^{1} Spanish Socialist Workers' Party results are compared to the combined totals of Spanish Socialist Workers' Party and People's Socialist Party–Socialist Unity in the 1977 election.; ^{2} Right Independent Group results are compared to People's Alliance totals in the 1977 election.; ^{3} National Union results are compared to National Alliance July 18 totals in the 1977 election.; ^{4} Party of Labour of Spain results are compared to Democratic Left Front totals in the 1977 election.; ^{5} Workers' Revolutionary Organization results are compared to Workers' Electoral Group totals in the 1977 election.

=== Castile and León ===
← Summary of the 1 March 1979 Congress of Deputies election results in Castile and León →
Parties and alliances	Popular vote			Seats	
Parties and alliances	Votes	%	±pp	Total	+/−
Union of the Democratic Centre (UCD)	682,126	50.98	−0.45	25	±0
Spanish Socialist Workers' Party (PSOE)^{1}	342,798	25.62	−1.55	10	+2
Democratic Coalition (CD)^{2}	125,744	9.40	−2.30	0	−2
Communist Party of Spain (PCE)	65,096	4.86	+1.18	0	±0
National Union (UN)^{3}	29,874	2.23	+1.69	0	±0
Nationalist Party of Castile and León (PANCAL)	16,016	1.20	New	0	±0
Party of Labour of Spain (PTE)^{4}	10,406	0.78	+0.01	0	±0
Spanish Ruralist Party (PRE)	10,324	0.77	New	0	±0
Spanish Socialist Workers' Party (historical) (PSOEh)^{5}	7,694	0.57	+0.06	0	±0
Workers' Revolutionary Organization (ORT)^{6}	7,636	0.57	+0.34	0	±0
Communist Movement–Organization of Communist Left (MC–OIC)^{7}	6,138	0.46	+0.35	0	±0
Independent Candidacy of the Countryside (CIC)	6,115	0.46	New	0	±0
Spanish Phalanx of the CNSO (Authentic) (FE–JONS(A))	4,746	0.35	+0.03	0	±0
Workers' Communist Party (PCT)	3,770	0.28	New	0	±0
Liberal Party (PL)	3,203	0.24	New	0	±0
Revolutionary Communist League (LCR)^{8}	2,796	0.21	+0.14	0	±0
Communist Organization of Spain (Red Flag) (OCE–BR)	1,907	0.14	New	0	±0
Republican Left (IR)	1,327	0.10	New	0	±0
Carlist Party (PC)	1,096	0.08	New	0	±0
Authentic Spanish Phalanx (FEA)	643	0.05	New	0	±0
Workers and Peasants Party (POC)	493	0.04	New	0	±0
Union for the Freedom of Speech (ULE)	118	0.01	New	0	±0
Proverist Party (PPr)	117	0.01	New	0	±0
Communist League (LC)	0	0.00	New	0	±0
Blank ballots	7,932	0.59	+0.20		
Total	1,338,115			35	±0
Valid votes	1,338,115	98.51	+0.22		
Invalid votes	20,230	1.49	−0.22		
Votes cast / turnout	1,358,345	69.58	−11.34		
Abstentions	593,819	30.42	+11.34		
Registered voters	1,952,164				
Sources
Footnotes: ^{1} Spanish Socialist Workers' Party results are compared to the combined totals of Spanish Socialist Workers' Party and People's Socialist Party–Socialist Unity in the 1977 election.; ^{2} Democratic Coalition results are compared to People's Alliance totals in the 1977 election.; ^{3} National Union results are compared to the combined totals of National Alliance July 18 and New Force in the 1977 election.; ^{4} Party of Labour of Spain results are compared to Democratic Left Front totals in the 1977 election.; ^{5} Spanish Socialist Workers' Party (historical) results are compared to Democratic Socialist Alliance totals in the 1977 election.; ^{6} Workers' Revolutionary Organization results are compared to Workers' Electoral Group totals in the 1977 election.; ^{7} Communist Movement–Organization of Communist Left results are compared to Regionalist Left Unitary Candidacy totals in the 1977 election.; ^{8} Revolutionary Communist League results are compared to Front for Workers' Unity totals in the 1977 election.

=== Castilla–La Mancha ===
← Summary of the 1 March 1979 Congress of Deputies election results in Castilla–La Mancha →
Parties and alliances	Popular vote			Seats	
Parties and alliances	Votes	%	±pp	Total	+/−
Union of the Democratic Centre (UCD)	378,113	43.02	+0.49	13	+1
Spanish Socialist Workers' Party (PSOE)^{1}	303,558	34.54	+0.93	8	±0
Communist Party of Spain (PCE)	85,825	9.77	+2.52	0	±0
Democratic Coalition (CD)^{2}	50,620	5.76	−7.10	0	−1
National Union (UN)^{3}	38,271	4.35	+2.18	0	±0
Party of Labour of Spain (PTE)^{4}	4,951	0.56	±0.00	0	±0
Spanish Socialist Workers' Party (historical) (PSOEh)^{5}	4,624	0.53	+0.36	0	±0
Workers' Revolutionary Organization (ORT)	3,833	0.44	New	0	±0
Spanish Phalanx of the CNSO (Authentic) (FE–JONS(A))	1,703	0.19	−0.03	0	±0
Communist Organization of Spain (Red Flag) (OCE–BR)	1,637	0.19	New	0	±0
Authentic Spanish Phalanx (FEA)	1,377	0.16	New	0	±0
Carlist Party (PC)	806	0.09	New	0	±0
Workers' Communist Party (PCT)	338	0.04	New	0	±0
Republican Left (IR)	311	0.04	New	0	±0
Communist Movement–Organization of Communist Left (MC–OIC)	303	0.03	New	0	±0
Communist Unification of Spain (UCE)	286	0.03	New	0	±0
Revolutionary Communist League (LCR)	165	0.02	New	0	±0
Blank ballots	2,115	0.24	+0.03		
Total	878,836			21	±0
Valid votes	878,836	98.93	+0.08		
Invalid votes	9,497	1.07	−0.08		
Votes cast / turnout	888,333	72.78	−10.83		
Abstentions	332,263	27.22	+10.83		
Registered voters	1,220,596				
Sources
Footnotes: ^{1} Spanish Socialist Workers' Party results are compared to the combined totals of Spanish Socialist Workers' Party and People's Socialist Party–Socialist Unity in the 1977 election.; ^{2} Democratic Coalition results are compared to People's Alliance totals in the 1977 election.; ^{3} National Union results are compared to the combined totals of National Alliance July 18, Spanish Phalanx of the CNSO, New Force and José Antonio Circles in the 1977 election.; ^{4} Party of Labour of Spain results are compared to Democratic Left Front totals in the 1977 election.; ^{5} Spanish Socialist Workers' Party (historical) results are compared to Democratic Socialist Alliance totals in the 1977 election.

=== Catalonia ===
← Summary of the 1 March 1979 Congress of Deputies election results in Catalonia →
Parties and alliances	Popular vote			Seats	
Parties and alliances	Votes	%	±pp	Total	+/−
Socialists' Party of Catalonia (PSC–PSOE)^{1}	875,529	29.67	−0.30	17	+2
Centrists of Catalonia (CC–UCD)^{2}	570,948	19.35	+2.44	12	+3
Unified Socialist Party of Catalonia (PSUC–PCE)	512,792	17.38	−0.93	8	±0
Convergence and Union (CiU)^{3}	483,353	16.38	−6.17	8	−5
Republican Left of Catalonia–National Front of Catalonia (ERC–FNC)^{4}	123,452	4.18	−0.54	1	±0
Democratic Coalition (CD)^{5}	107,629	3.65	+0.10	1	±0
Left Bloc for National Liberation (BEAN)	46,962	1.59	New	0	±0
Party of Labour of Catalonia (PTC–PTE)	40,345	1.37	New	0	±0
Spanish Socialist Workers' Party (historical) (PSOEh)^{6}	29,868	1.01	+0.72	0	±0
National Union (UN)^{7}	27,301	0.93	+0.64	0	±0
Republican Left (IR)	18,558	0.63	New	0	±0
Workers' Communist Party (PCT)	13,208	0.45	New	0	±0
Workers' Revolutionary Organization (ORT)^{8}	13,028	0.44	+0.03	0	±0
Communist Movement–Organization of Communist Left (MC–OIC)^{9}	13,028	0.44	+0.04	0	±0
Communist Organization of Spain (Red Flag) (OCE–BR)	11,114	0.38	New	0	±0
Revolutionary Communist League (LCR)^{10}	6,937	0.24	−0.32	0	±0
Communist Unification of Spain (UCE)	6,515	0.22	New	0	±0
Catalan State (EC)	6,328	0.21	New	0	±0
Syndicalist Party (PSIN)	5,932	0.20	New	0	±0
Carlist Party (PC)	5,154	0.17	New	0	±0
Social Christian Democracy of Catalonia (DSCC)	4,976	0.17	−0.13	0	±0
Spanish Phalanx of the CNSO (Authentic) (FE–JONS(A))	4,318	0.15	−0.08	0	±0
Liberal Party of Catalonia (PLC)	3,267	0.11	New	0	±0
Basque Country Left (EE)	2,550	0.09	New	0	±0
Pro-Austerity Policy Political Party (PIPPA)	2,409	0.08	New	0	±0
Union for the Freedom of Speech (ULE)	2,300	0.08	New	0	±0
Proverist Party (PPr)	1,622	0.05	−0.09	0	±0
Communist League (LC)	0	0.00	New	0	±0
Spanish Phalanx–Falangist Unity (FE–UF)	0	0.00	New	0	±0
Blank ballots	11,712	0.40	+0.21		
Total	2,951,135			47	±0
Valid votes	2,951,135	98.24	−0.43		
Invalid votes	52,966	1.76	+0.43		
Votes cast / turnout	3,004,101	67.62	−11.92		
Abstentions	1,438,560	32.38	+11.92		
Registered voters	4,442,661				
Sources
Footnotes: ^{1} Socialists' Party of Catalonia results are compared to the combined totals of Socialists of Catalonia and People's Socialist Party–Socialist Unity in the 1977 election.; ^{2} Centrists of Catalonia results are compared to Union of the Democratic Centre totals in the 1977 election.; ^{3} Convergence and Union results are compared to the combined totals of Democratic Pact for Catalonia and Union of the Centre and Christian Democracy of Catalonia in the 1977 election.; ^{4} Republican Left of Catalonia–National Front of Catalonia results are compared to Left of Catalonia–Democratic Electoral Front totals in the 1977 election.; ^{5} Democratic Coalition results are compared to Catalan Coexistence–People's Alliance totals in the 1977 election.; ^{6} Spanish Socialist Workers' Party (historical) results are compared to Democratic Socialist Alliance totals in the 1977 election.; ^{7} National Union results are compared to National Alliance July 18 totals in the 1977 election.; ^{8} Workers' Revolutionary Organization results are compared to Workers' Electoral Group totals in the 1977 election.; ^{9} Communist Movement–Organization of Communist Left results are compared to Popular Unity for Socialism Candidacy totals in the 1977 election.; ^{10} Revolutionary Communist League results are compared to Front for Workers' Unity totals in the 1977 election.

=== Extremadura ===
← Summary of the 1 March 1979 Congress of Deputies election results in Extremadura →
Parties and alliances	Popular vote			Seats	
Parties and alliances	Votes	%	±pp	Total	+/−
Union of the Democratic Centre (UCD)	244,291	45.59	−4.45	7	−1
Spanish Socialist Workers' Party (PSOE)^{1}	201,350	37.57	+4.93	5	+1
Communist Party of Spain (PCE)	41,650	7.77	+2.33	0	±0
Democratic Coalition (CD)^{2}	19,684	3.67	−4.16	0	±0
National Union (UN)^{3}	11,876	2.22	+1.56	0	±0
Workers' Revolutionary Organization (ORT)^{4}	6,282	1.17	+0.55	0	±0
Party of Labour of Spain (PTE)^{5}	3,279	0.61	New	0	±0
Spanish Socialist Workers' Party (historical) (PSOEh)^{6}	3,183	0.59	+0.39	0	±0
Communist Movement–Organization of Communist Left (MC–OIC)	1,343	0.25	New	0	±0
Spanish Phalanx of the CNSO (Authentic) (FE–JONS(A))	746	0.14	−0.23	0	±0
Authentic Spanish Phalanx (FEA)	716	0.13	New	0	±0
Republican Left (IR)	470	0.09	New	0	±0
Blank ballots	1,029	0.19	±0.00		
Total	535,899			12	±0
Valid votes	535,899	98.90	+0.09		
Invalid votes	5,968	1.10	−0.09		
Votes cast / turnout	541,867	70.08	−7.13		
Abstentions	231,391	29.92	+7.13		
Registered voters	773,258				
Sources
Footnotes: ^{1} Spanish Socialist Workers' Party results are compared to the combined totals of Spanish Socialist Workers' Party and People's Socialist Party–Socialist Unity in the 1977 election.; ^{2} Democratic Coalition results are compared to People's Alliance totals in the 1977 election.; ^{3} National Union results are compared to National Alliance July 18 totals in the 1977 election.; ^{4} Workers' Revolutionary Organization results are compared to Workers' Electoral Group totals in the 1977 election.; ^{5} Party of Labour of Spain results are compared to Democratic Left Front totals in the 1977 election.; ^{6} Spanish Socialist Workers' Party (historical) results are compared to Democratic Socialist Alliance totals in the 1977 election.

=== Galicia ===
← Summary of the 1 March 1979 Congress of Deputies election results in Galicia →
Parties and alliances	Popular vote			Seats	
Parties and alliances	Votes	%	±pp	Total	+/−
Union of the Democratic Centre (UCD)	493,124	48.18	−5.58	17	−3
Spanish Socialist Workers' Party (PSOE)^{1}	177,298	17.32	−2.90	6	+3
Democratic Coalition (CD)^{2}	145,266	14.19	+1.06	4	±0
Galician National-Popular Bloc (BNPG)	60,889	5.95	+3.93	0	±0
Galician Unity (PG–POG–PSG)^{3}	55,555	5.43	+3.02	0	±0
Communist Party of Spain (PCE)	42,594	4.16	+1.13	0	±0
Spanish Socialist Workers' Party (historical) (PSOEh)^{4}	12,368	1.21	+0.79	0	±0
National Union (UN)^{5}	7,834	0.77	+0.58	0	±0
Party of Labour of Spain (PTE)^{6}	6,828	0.67	+0.02	0	±0
Communist Movement of Galicia–Organization of Communist Left (MCG–OIC)	4,833	0.47	New	0	±0
Workers' Revolutionary Organization (ORT)^{7}	3,207	0.31	+0.07	0	±0
Republican Left (IR)	3,118	0.30	New	0	±0
Revolutionary Communist League (LCR)^{8}	2,788	0.27	+0.06	0	±0
Workers' Communist Party (PCT)	2,271	0.22	New	0	±0
Carlist Party (PC)	1,711	0.17	New	0	±0
Communist Organization of Spain (Red Flag) (OCE–BR)	1,446	0.14	New	0	±0
Communist League (LC)	249	0.02	New	0	±0
Spanish Phalanx–Falangist Unity (FE–UF)	216	0.02	New	0	±0
Proverist Party (PPr)	195	0.02	New	0	±0
Blank ballots	1,786	0.17	−0.25		
Total	1,023,576			27	±0
Valid votes	1,023,576	98.45	+0.51		
Invalid votes	16,167	1.55	−0.51		
Votes cast / turnout	1,039,743	49.20	−11.53		
Abstentions	1,073,556	50.80	+11.53		
Registered voters	2,113,299				
Sources
Footnotes: ^{1} Spanish Socialist Workers' Party results are compared to the combined totals of Spanish Socialist Workers' Party and People's Socialist Party–Socialist Unity in the 1977 election.; ^{2} Democratic Coalition results are compared to People's Alliance totals in the 1977 election.; ^{3} Galician Unity results are compared to Galician Socialist Party totals in the 1977 election.; ^{4} Spanish Socialist Workers' Party (historical) results are compared to Democratic Socialist Alliance totals in the 1977 election.; ^{5} National Union results are compared to National Alliance July 18 totals in the 1977 election.; ^{6} Party of Labour of Spain results are compared to Democratic Left Front totals in the 1977 election.; ^{7} Workers' Revolutionary Organization results are compared to Workers' Electoral Group totals in the 1977 election.; ^{8} Revolutionary Communist League results are compared to Front for Workers' Unity totals in the 1977 election.

=== La Rioja ===
← Summary of the 1 March 1979 Congress of Deputies election results in La Rioja →
Parties and alliances	Popular vote			Seats	
Parties and alliances	Votes	%	±pp	Total	+/−
Union of the Democratic Centre (UCD)	64,735	48.04	+6.69	3	+1
Spanish Socialist Workers' Party (PSOE)^{1}	39,245	29.13	+0.52	1	±0
Democratic Coalition (CD)^{2}	18,686	13.87	−0.60	0	−1
Communist Party of Spain (PCE)	4,810	3.57	+0.78	0	±0
National Union (UN)	1,569	1.16	New	0	±0
Workers' Revolutionary Organization (ORT)^{3}	1,546	1.15	−0.29	0	±0
Party of Labour of Spain (PTE)^{4}	1,053	0.78	+0.05	0	±0
Communist Movement–Organization of Communist Left (MC–OIC)	982	0.73	New	0	±0
Carlist Party (PC)	583	0.43	New	0	±0
Republican Left (IR)	462	0.34	New	0	±0
Communist Organization of Spain (Red Flag) (OCE–BR)	274	0.20	New	0	±0
Proverist Party (PPr)	148	0.11	New	0	±0
Blank ballots	646	0.48	+0.12		
Total	134,739			4	±0
Valid votes	134,739	98.77	+0.74		
Invalid votes	1,680	1.23	−0.74		
Votes cast / turnout	136,419	73.31	−10.76		
Abstentions	49,678	26.69	+10.76		
Registered voters	186,097				
Sources
Footnotes: ^{1} Spanish Socialist Workers' Party results are compared to the combined totals of Spanish Socialist Workers' Party and People's Socialist Party–Socialist Unity in the 1977 election.; ^{2} Democratic Coalition results are compared to People's Alliance totals in the 1977 election.; ^{3} Workers' Revolutionary Organization results are compared to Workers' Electoral Group totals in the 1977 election.; ^{4} Party of Labour of Spain results are compared to Democratic Left Front totals in the 1977 election.

=== Madrid ===
← Summary of the 1 March 1979 Congress of Deputies election results in Madrid →
Parties and alliances	Popular vote			Seats	
Parties and alliances	Votes	%	±pp	Total	+/−
Spanish Socialist Workers' Party (PSOE)^{1}	769,328	33.34	−7.50	12	−2
Union of the Democratic Centre (UCD)	764,830	33.14	+1.19	12	+1
Communist Party of Spain (PCE)	310,496	13.46	+2.76	4	±0
Democratic Coalition (CD)^{2}	198,345	8.60	−1.88	3	±0
National Union (UN)^{3}	110,730	4.80	+4.11	1	+1
Workers' Revolutionary Organization (ORT)^{4}	48,354	2.10	+1.39	0	±0
Party of Labour of Spain (PTE)^{5}	25,832	1.12	+0.54	0	±0
Spanish Socialist Workers' Party (historical) (PSOEh)^{6}	13,322	0.58	−0.65	0	±0
Communist Movement–Organization of Communist Left (MC–OIC)^{7}	9,095	0.39	+0.16	0	±0
Republican Left (IR)	7,950	0.34	New	0	±0
Communist Unification of Spain (UCE)	6,680	0.29	New	0	±0
Spanish Phalanx of the CNSO (Authentic) (FE–JONS(A))	5,264	0.23	−0.09	0	±0
Liberal Party (PL)	4,873	0.21	New	0	±0
Revolutionary Communist League (LCR)^{8}	4,691	0.20	+0.06	0	±0
Workers' Communist Party (PCT)	4,675	0.20	New	0	±0
Syndicalist Party (PSIN)	3,845	0.17	New	0	±0
Basque Country Left (EE)	3,029	0.13	New	0	±0
Communist League (LC)	2,705	0.12	New	0	±0
Union for the Freedom of Speech (ULE)	1,716	0.07	New	0	±0
Carlist Party (PC)	1,683	0.07	New	0	±0
Proverist Party (PPr)	1,510	0.07	New	0	±0
Blank ballots	8,691	0.38	+0.12		
Total	2,307,644			32	±0
Valid votes	2,307,644	99.12	+0.14		
Invalid votes	20,585	0.88	−0.14		
Votes cast / turnout	2,328,229	73.27	−11.73		
Abstentions	849,503	26.73	+11.73		
Registered voters	3,177,732				
Sources
Footnotes: ^{1} Spanish Socialist Workers' Party results are compared to the combined totals of Spanish Socialist Workers' Party and People's Socialist Party–Socialist Unity in the 1977 election.; ^{2} Democratic Coalition results are compared to People's Alliance totals in the 1977 election.; ^{3} National Union results are compared to the combined totals of Spanish Phalanx of the CNSO and José Antonio Circles in the 1977 election.; ^{4} Workers' Revolutionary Organization results are compared to Workers' Electoral Group totals in the 1977 election.; ^{5} Party of Labour of Spain results are compared to Democratic Left Front totals in the 1977 election.; ^{6} Spanish Socialist Workers' Party (historical) results are compared to Democratic Socialist Alliance totals in the 1977 election.; ^{7} Communist Movement–Organization of Communist Left results are compared to Popular Unity Candidates totals in the 1977 election.; ^{8} Revolutionary Communist League results are compared to Front for Workers' Unity totals in the 1977 election.

=== Murcia ===
← Summary of the 1 March 1979 Congress of Deputies election results in Murcia →
Parties and alliances	Popular vote			Seats	
Parties and alliances	Votes	%	±pp	Total	+/−
Spanish Socialist Workers' Party (PSOE)^{1}	178,621	39.15	−0.85	4	±0
Union of the Democratic Centre (UCD)	178,229	39.07	−1.63	4	±0
Communist Party of Spain (PCE)	36,090	7.91	+1.22	0	±0
Democratic Coalition (CD)^{2}	25,903	5.68	−1.08	0	±0
Spanish Socialist Workers' Party (historical) (PSOEh)^{3}	7,784	1.71	+0.39	0	±0
National Union (UN)^{4}	6,925	1.52	+1.00	0	±0
Cantonal Party (PCAN)	6,290	1.38	New	0	±0
Workers' Revolutionary Organization (ORT)^{5}	4,715	1.03	+0.45	0	±0
Carlist Party (PC)	1,847	0.40	New	0	±0
Party of Labour of Spain (PTE)^{6}	1,841	0.40	+0.05	0	±0
Communist Unification of Spain (UCE)	1,684	0.37	New	0	±0
Spanish Phalanx of the CNSO (Authentic) (FE–JONS(A))	1,469	0.32	−0.05	0	±0
Communist Movement–Organization of Communist Left (MC–OIC)	1,157	0.25	New	0	±0
Workers' Communist Party (PCT)	1,050	0.23	New	0	±0
Revolutionary Communist League (LCR)	522	0.11	New	0	±0
Union for the Freedom of Speech (ULE)	0	0.00	New	0	±0
Communist League (LC)	0	0.00	New	0	±0
Authentic Spanish Phalanx (FEA)	0	0.00	New	0	±0
Blank ballots	2,082	0.46	+0.31		
Total	456,209			8	±0
Valid votes	456,209	98.75	−0.26		
Invalid votes	5,762	1.25	+0.26		
Votes cast / turnout	461,971	72.71	−9.09		
Abstentions	173,405	27.29	+9.09		
Registered voters	635,376				
Sources
Footnotes: ^{1} Spanish Socialist Workers' Party results are compared to the combined totals of Spanish Socialist Workers' Party and People's Socialist Party–Socialist Unity in the 1977 election.; ^{2} Democratic Coalition results are compared to People's Alliance totals in the 1977 election.; ^{3} Spanish Socialist Workers' Party (historical) results are compared to Democratic Socialist Alliance totals in the 1977 election.; ^{4} National Union results are compared to New Force totals in the 1977 election.; ^{5} Workers' Revolutionary Organization results are compared to Workers' Electoral Group totals in the 1977 election.; ^{6} Party of Labour of Spain results are compared to Democratic Left Front totals in the 1977 election.

=== Navarre ===
← Summary of the 1 March 1979 Congress of Deputies election results in Navarre →
Parties and alliances	Popular vote			Seats	
Parties and alliances	Votes	%	±pp	Total	+/−
Union of the Democratic Centre (UCD)	83,302	32.93	+3.90	3	±0
Spanish Socialist Workers' Party (PSOE)^{1}	55,399	21.90	−1.83	1	−1
Navarrese People's Union (UPN)	28,248	11.17	New	1	+1
Popular Unity (HB)^{2}	22,425	8.86	n/a	0	±0
Basque Nationalist Party (EAJ/PNV)^{2}	21,305	8.42	n/a	0	±0
Carlist Party (PC)	19,522	7.72	+4.45	0	±0
Navarrese Left Union (UNAI)^{3}	10,970	4.34	−10.24	0	±0
Communist Party of the Basque Country (PCE/EPK)	5,619	2.22	−0.22	0	±0
Communist Movement–Organization of Communist Left (MC–OIC)	2,962	1.17	New	0	±0
Revolutionary Communist League (LCR)^{4}	1,040	0.41	−0.12	0	±0
Communist League (LC)	660	0.26	New	0	±0
Republican Left (IR)	514	0.20	New	0	±0
Proverist Party (PPr)	205	0.08	New	0	±0
Blank ballots	821	0.32	+0.09		
Total	252,992			5	±0
Valid votes	252,992	98.44	−0.01		
Invalid votes	4,013	1.56	+0.01		
Votes cast / turnout	257,005	70.66	−11.58		
Abstentions	106,708	29.34	+11.58		
Registered voters	363,713				
Sources
Footnotes: ^{1} Spanish Socialist Workers' Party results are compared to the combined totals of Spanish Socialist Workers' Party and People's Socialist Party–Socialist Unity in the 1977 election.; ^{2} Within the Navarrese Autonomist Union alliance in the 1977 election.; ^{3} Navarrese Left Union results are compared to the combined totals of Navarrese Left Union and Workers' Electoral Group totals in the 1977 election.; ^{4} Revolutionary Communist League results are compared to Front for Workers' Unity totals in the 1977 election.

=== Valencian Community ===
← Summary of the 1 March 1979 Congress of Deputies election results in the Valencian Community →
Parties and alliances	Popular vote			Seats	
Parties and alliances	Votes	%	±pp	Total	+/−
Spanish Socialist Workers' Party (PSOE)^{1}	698,677	37.31	−3.66	13	−1
Union of the Democratic Centre (UCD)	683,104	36.48	+3.50	13	+2
Communist Party of Spain (PCE)	224,520	11.99	+2.85	3	+1
Democratic Coalition (CD)^{2}	84,316	4.50	−1.43	0	−1
National Union (UN)^{3}	43,239	2.31	+1.06	0	±0
Spanish Socialist Workers' Party (historical) (PSOEh)^{4}	19,883	1.06	+0.39	0	±0
Valencian Regional Union (URV)	15,694	0.84	New	0	±0
Nationalist Party of the Valencian Country (PNPV)	13,828	0.74	New	0	±0
Communist Movement–Organization of Communist Left (MCPV–OIC)	12,355	0.66	New	0	±0
Workers' Revolutionary Organization (ORT)^{5}	10,716	0.57	+0.34	0	±0
Workers' Communist Party (PCT)	10,675	0.57	New	0	±0
Republican Left (IR)	9,676	0.52	New	0	±0
Left Bloc for National Liberation (BEAN)	9,620	0.51	New	0	±0
Party of Labour of Spain (PTE)^{6}	7,716	0.41	−0.15	0	±0
Carlist Party (PC)	4,529	0.24	New	0	±0
Spanish Phalanx of the CNSO (Authentic) (FE–JONS(A))	4,276	0.23	−0.02	0	±0
Republican Alliance–Valencian Front (IRA–ARDE)	4,119	0.22	New	0	±0
Revolutionary Communist League (LCR)^{7}	3,477	0.19	−0.05	0	±0
Liberal Party (PL)	2,947	0.16	New	0	±0
Communist Organization–Communist Unification (OCEBR–UCE)	2,754	0.15	New	0	±0
Communist Organization of Spain (Red Flag) (OCE–BR)	962	0.05	New	0	±0
Workers and Peasants Party (POC)	417	0.02	New	0	±0
Union for the Freedom of Speech (ULE)	0	0.00	New	0	±0
Centre Independent Candidacy (CIC)	n/a	n/a	−1.60	0	−1
Blank ballots	5,209	0.28	+0.08		
Total	1,872,709			29	±0
Valid votes	1,872,709	98.73	−0.08		
Invalid votes	24,075	1.27	+0.08		
Votes cast / turnout	1,896,784	74.89	−9.17		
Abstentions	635,976	25.11	+9.17		
Registered voters	2,532,760				
Sources
Footnotes: ^{1} Spanish Socialist Workers' Party results are compared to the combined totals of Spanish Socialist Workers' Party and People's Socialist Party–Socialist Unity in the 1977 election.; ^{2} Democratic Coalition results are compared to People's Alliance totals in the 1977 election.; ^{3} National Union results are compared to the combined totals of National Alliance July 18, José Antonio Circles, Spanish Phalanx of the CNSO and New Force in the 1977 election.; ^{4} Spanish Socialist Workers' Party (historical) results are compared to Democratic Socialist Alliance totals in the 1977 election.; ^{5} Workers' Revolutionary Organization results are compared to Workers' Electoral Group totals in the 1977 election.; ^{6} Party of Labour of Spain results are compared to Democratic Left Front totals in the 1977 election.; ^{7} Revolutionary Communist League results are compared to Front for Workers' Unity totals in the 1977 election.

== Autonomous cities ==
=== Ceuta ===
← Summary of the 1 March 1979 Congress of Deputies election results in Ceuta →
Parties and alliances	Popular vote			Seats	
Parties and alliances	Votes	%	±pp	Total	+/−
Union of the Democratic Centre (UCD)	11,020	51.87	+15.61	1	±0
Spanish Socialist Workers' Party (PSOE)^{1}	7,502	35.31	−8.54	0	±0
Democratic Coalition (CD)^{2}	1,669	7.86	−4.14	0	±0
National Union (UN)	735	3.46	New	0	±0
Workers' Revolutionary Organization (ORT)	115	0.54	New	0	±0
Communist Movement–Organization of Communist Left (MC–OIC)	91	0.43	New	0	±0
Blank ballots	112	0.53	+0.25		
Total	21,244			1	±0
Valid votes	21,244	98.88	+0.05		
Invalid votes	240	1.12	−0.05		
Votes cast / turnout	21,484	65.44	−12.16		
Abstentions	11,347	34.56	+12.16		
Registered voters	32,831				
Sources
Footnotes: ^{1} Spanish Socialist Workers' Party results are compared to the combined totals of Spanish Socialist Workers' Party and People's Socialist Party–Socialist Unity in the 1977 election.; ^{2} Democratic Coalition results are compared to Action for Ceuta totals in the 1977 election.

=== Melilla ===
← Summary of the 1 March 1979 Congress of Deputies election results in Melilla →
Parties and alliances	Popular vote			Seats	
Parties and alliances	Votes	%	±pp	Total	+/−
Union of the Democratic Centre (UCD)	9,035	51.57	−4.70	1	±0
Spanish Socialist Workers' Party (PSOE)	3,750	21.40	−5.72	0	±0
Independent Candidates of Melilla (CIME)	1,820	10.39	New	0	±0
Democratic Coalition (CD)^{1}	848	4.84	−6.04	0	±0
Communist Party of Spain (PCE)	793	4.53	−0.54	0	±0
National Union (UN)	429	2.45	New	0	±0
Party of Labour of Spain (PTE)	353	2.01	New	0	±0
Carlist Party (PC)	194	1.11	New	0	±0
Communist Movement–Organization of Communist Left (MC–OIC)	180	1.03	New	0	±0
Workers' Revolutionary Organization (ORT)	46	0.26	New	0	±0
Union for the Freedom of Speech (ULE)	9	0.05	New	0	±0
Blank ballots	63	0.36	−0.20		
Total	17,520			1	±0
Valid votes	17,520	99.06	+0.28		
Invalid votes	166	0.94	−0.28		
Votes cast / turnout	17,686	60.67	−15.37		
Abstentions	11,463	39.33	+15.37		
Registered voters	29,149				
Sources
Footnotes: ^{1} Democratic Coalition results are compared to People's Alliance totals in the 1977 election.
