= Catalan Centre =

Catalan Centre Centre Català
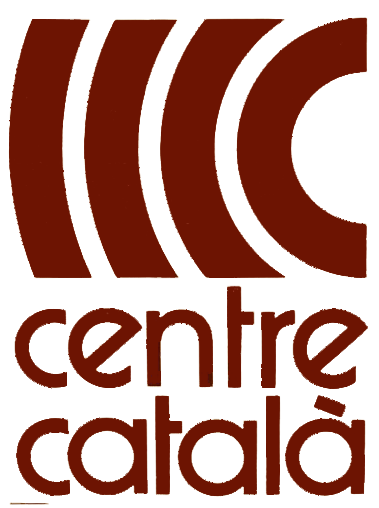
- President: Joan Mas
- Secretary-General: Joaquim Molins
- Founded: February 1976
- Dissolved: 21 March 1978
- Merged into: Union of the Centre of Catalonia
- Ideology: Liberalism; Federalism; Pro-Europeanism
- Political position: Centre
- National affiliation: Union of the Centre and Christian Democracy of Catalonia (1976–77); Democracy and Catalonia (1977–78)

Catalan Centre (Catalan: Centre Català) was a Spanish political party of the Catalan region born during the Spanish transition to democracy in 1976. It was part of the Union of the Centre and Christian Democracy of Catalonia (UCiDCC) in the 1977 Spanish general election, but it later dissolved to merge into the Union of the Centre of Catalonia (UCC) in 1978.

== History ==
The party was created in Barcelona by the initiative of young entrepreneurs and professionals linked to the Barcelona Economic Circle and the Jove Cambra (chamber of young entrepreneurs). Its president was Joan Mas, with Joaquim Molins as secretary-general, with the party including other entrepreneurs like Carlos Ferrer Salat, Carles Güell de Sentmenat, Jordi Planasdemunt, Figa and Vicenç Lluís Oller, all of them without links neither with the Francoist regime nor with the clandestine democratic opposition. Its program was defined as Catalanist, federalist, pro-European and advocating a free market economy. Influenced by Valéry Giscard d'Estaing and linked to the thesis of the Council of Political Forces of Catalonia (Catalan: Consell de Forces Polítiques de Catalunya), it aimed at occupying a centre-right democratic, progressive space.

Ahead of the 1977 Spanish general election, it reached an electoral agreement with the Democratic Union of Catalonia (UDC) to run under the Union of the Centre and Christian Democracy of Catalonia (UCiDCC) label, but results were regarded as a disappointment after obtaining only one seat—out of the two obtained by the coalition—for Güell de Sentmentat, who joined the Mixed Group upon the start of the parliamentary term, resulting in the UCiDCC's dissolution.

Following the election, party members adopted a new political line in the congress held in October 1977, advocating for the creation of a new Catalan, progressive and centrist party, that was able to constitute itself in an electoral alternative to the popular strength shown "by the socialist and communist left" in Catalonia, and which comprised the UCD political space. Negotiations started with the Catalan UCD throughout the second half of 1977, with unsuccessful attempts of bringing the UDC but also Democratic Convergence of Catalonia (CDC) and Democratic Left of Catalonia (EDC) into supporting the party's new strategy of establishing "the central bloc of Catalan politics". These efforts would result in the merging of CC, together with the Union of the Christian Democrats of Catalonia–Jacques Maritain Club—a split from UDC—the Party of the Catalan People, members from the League of Catalonia–Catalan Liberal Party and most of the Social Democratic Party of Catalonia, into the Union of the Centre of Catalonia.
