= Democratic Pact for Catalonia =

Democratic Pact for Catalonia Pacte Democràtic per Catalunya
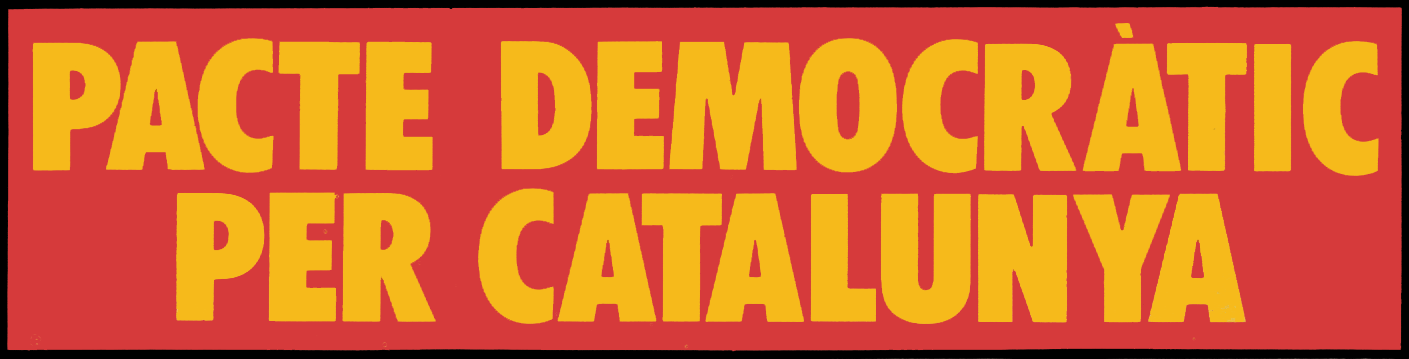
- Abbreviation: PDC; PDpC
- Leader: Jordi Pujol
- Founded: 3 January 1977 (Democratic Front); 11 March 1977 (Left Front); 3 May 1977 (Democratic Pact)
- Dissolved: 1978
- Succeeded by: Convergence and Union
- Ideology: Catalan nationalism Autonomism; Liberalism; Social liberalism
- Political position: Centre to centre-left
- Members: See list of members

The Democratic Pact for Catalonia (Catalan: Pacte Democràtic per Catalunya, PDC or PDpC) was a Catalan electoral alliance established in May 1977 ahead of the Spanish Congress of Deputies 15 June election. It ran on a political platform emphasizing the need of approving a statute of autonomy for Catalonia. The coalition comprised members from two separate, previously established alliances: Democratic Convergence of Catalonia (CDC) and Democratic Left of Catalonia (EDC) from the Democratic Front for Catalonia (Catalan: Front Democràtic per Catalunya, FDC), and the Socialist Party of Catalonia–Regrouping (PSC–R) and the National Front of Catalonia (FNC) from the Left Front (Catalan: Front d'Esquerres, FdE).

It obtained 514,647 votes (16.88% of the vote in Catalonia, 2.81% of the votes in Spain) and 11 deputies, of which 5 were for CDC, 4 for PSC–R and 2 for EDC. Its leader was Jordi Pujol. Shortly after the election, the coalition dissolved, as the PSC–R joined the Catalan Federation of the PSOE and the Socialist Party of Catalonia–Congress to form the Socialists' Party of Catalonia (PSC), while CDC (into which EDC was merged in 1978) joined with Democratic Union of Catalonia (UDC) to form Convergence and Union (CiU).

== History ==
The alliance had its origins in an electoral platform formed in October 1976 by the Socialist Party of Catalonia–Regrouping (PSC–R), initially attracting the interest of Democratic Left of Catalonia (EDC) and Republican Left of Catalonia (ERC), to promote a "Left Front" ahead of the upcoming legislative election in Spain, inviting parties from the centre and centre-left, such as Democratic Convergence of Catalonia (CDC) or the Socialist Convergence of Catalonia (CSC)—the latter of which would merge with other parties and organizations into the Socialist Party of Catalonia–Congress (PSC–C) in November that year—to join it. EDC disengaged from the platform in December 1976 and reached an electoral alliance with Jordi Pujol's CDC instead, whereas the Left Front was joined by the National Front of Catalonia (FNC) and Catalan State (EC) and formally constituted as an electoral coalition on 11 March 1977. The PSC–C rejected joining the Front, on the grounds that their two political projects "absolutely diverged, in terms of motivations and goals", exploring instead an electoral alliance with the Catalan Federation of the PSOE for the Congress of Deputies, as well as the Agreement of the Catalans unitary coalition for the Senate.

Throughout the subsequent weeks, contacts would be maintained with other parties for a possible expansion of the Front to the entire Catalan democratic and socialist left—and into a "Socialist and Democratic Bloc of Catalonia" (Catalan: Bloc Socialista y Democrátic de Catalunya)—but this came at the risk of compromising the Front's internal cohesion. Amid these expansion attempts, CDC's Jordi Pujol sought to incorporate the PSC–R, ERC and Democratic Union of Catalonia (UDC) into his "Democratic Front for Catalonia" alliance with EDC in order to establish a Catalanist bloc as broader as possible. While UDC was favourable to entering a coalition with CDC, it did not want to forego its agreement with the Catalan Centre, the Union of the Centre and Christian Democracy of Catalonia (UDCC), and saw the proposal as absent of a larger degree of programmatic concretion; EDC fully supported Pujol's proposal, whereas ERC and the PSC–R were initially only willing to consider alliances within the umbrella of their Left Front, as long as they respected their "Catalan Solidarity" proposal of post-election joint political action.

By late April, chances of UDC joining the CDC–EDC "Democratic Front" vanished after the former stuck to its UDCC alliance with the Catalan Centre, but negotiations continued between Pujol's alliance and the parties comprising the Left Front, resulting in the breakup of the latter and in the PSC–C and the FNC joining the CDC–EDC's coalition, rebranded as the "Democratic Pact for Catalonia", for the Congress of Deputies election. whereas ERC and EC were left out from the candidacy. A preliminary agreement had also been reached with the Social Democratic Party of Catalonia (PSDC), but it failed to materialize as the PSDC would attempt an alliance with the People's Party of Catalonia (PPC) and into the Union of the Democratic Centre in Catalonia (UCD).

== Composition ==
Party
Democratic Convergence of Catalonia (CDC)
Socialist Party of Catalonia–Regrouping (PSC–R)
Democratic Left of Catalonia (EDC)
National Front of Catalonia (FNC)

== Electoral performance ==
=== Congress of Deputies ===
==== Nationwide ====
Congress of Deputies
Election	Votes	%	#	Seats	+/–	Leading candidate	Status in legislature
1977	514,647	2.81%	6th	11 / 350	—	Jordi Pujol	Opposition

==== Regional breakdown ====
Election	Catalonia				
Election	Votes	%	#	Seats	+/–
1977	514,647	16.88%	4th	11 / 47	—

== See also ==
- Democracy and Catalonia
