= Union of the Centre and Christian Democracy of Catalonia =

Union of the Centre and Christian Democracy of Catalonia Unió del Centre i la Democràcia Cristiana de Catalunya
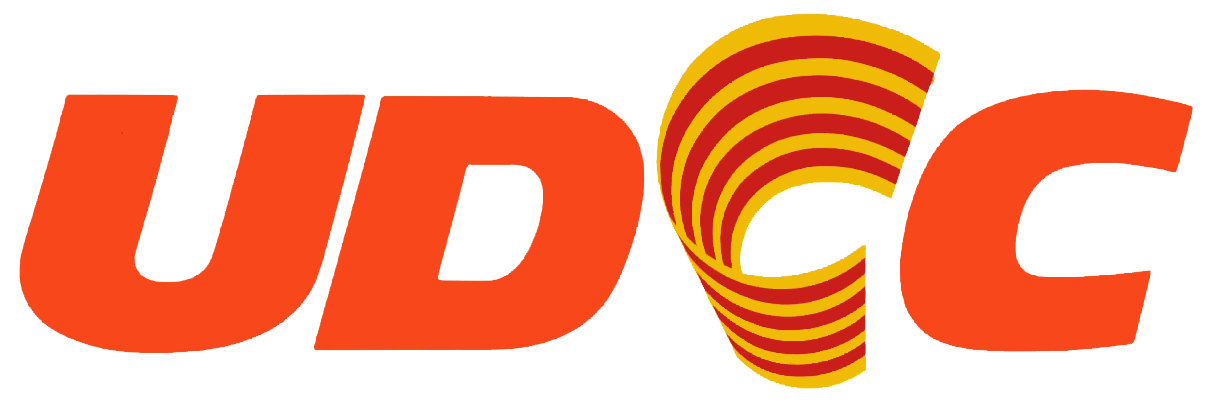
- Abbreviation: UDCC
- Founded: 28 December 1976
- Dissolved: 26 July 1977
- Succeeded by: Centrists of Catalonia; Convergence and Union
- Ideology: Christian democracy Liberalism; Catalan nationalism
- Political position: Centre to centre-right
- National affiliation: Christian Democratic Team of the Spanish State
- Members: See list of members

Union of the Centre and Christian Democracy of Catalonia (Catalan: Unió del Centre i la Democràcia Cristiana de Catalunya, UDCC) was an electoral coalition formed in Catalonia in December 1976 to contest the Spanish Congress of Deputies election of 1977, the first democratic election to be held in Spain since the Second Spanish Republic. It was formed by the Catalan Centre (CC) and the historic Democratic Union of Catalonia (UDC), and came to be supported by the Christian Democratic Team of the Spanish State, which did not run on its own in Catalonia. The coalition was officially registered on 3 May 1977. The alliance dissolved shortly after the election upon the start of the newly elected parliament, with UDC deputy Antón Cañellas joining the Catalan–Basque Group and Carlos Güell going into the Mixed Group.

== History ==
The alliance was formed by the Catalan Centre (CC) and the historic Democratic Union of Catalonia (UDC), which on 28 December 1976 had signed an agreement for coalescing into a joint list ahead of the 1977 Spanish general election. Attempts for the coalition to expand or to merge with parties from other blocs—such as the Democratic Front formed by Democratic Convergence of Catalonia (CDC) and Democratic Left of Catalonia (EDC)—failed to materialize, mostly as a result of a lack of programmatic concretion and in the Front's strategy to appeal to centre-left voters, whereas the UDCC aimed for establishing itself within the centre to centre-right ground of the political spectrum. The UDCC parties would join the Democracy and Catalonia alliance for the Spanish Senate.

The coalition obtained two deputies, both from the Barcelona constituency: Antón Cañellas from UDC and Carlos Güell de Sentmenat from CC. The former joined the Catalan–Basque Group, whereas the latter went to the Mixed Group. The results were regarded as disappointing–something which was attributed to the hasted establishment of the Union of the Democratic Centre (UCD) candidacies in support of Prime Minister Adolfo Suárez–leading to the alliance breaking up shortly after the election and upon the new parliament's constitution on 26 July 1977.

== Composition ==
Party
Democratic Union of Catalonia (UDC)
Catalan Centre (CC)

== Electoral performance ==
=== Congress of Deputies ===
Congress of Deputies
Election	Catalonia				
Election	Votes	%	#	Seats	+/–
1977	172,791	5.67%	5th	2 / 47	—
