= Democratic Left of Catalonia =

Democratic Left of Catalonia Esquerra Democràtica de Catalunya
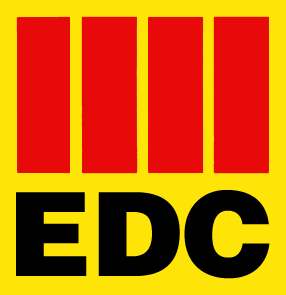
- Secretary-General: Ramón Trías Fargas
- Founded: 1975
- Dissolved: 27 June 1978
- Merged into: Democratic Convergence of Catalonia
- Ideology: Catalan nationalism Social liberalism Federalism; Liberalism
- Political position: Centre to centre-left
- National affiliation: Democratic Pact for Catalonia (1977–78); Democracy and Catalonia (1977–78)
- International affiliation: Liberal International

Democratic Left of Catalonia (Catalan: Esquerra Democràtica de Catalunya, EDC) was a political party in Catalonia (Spain). EDC was founded in 1975 as the Catalan Liberal Party (Catalan: Partit Liberal Català), and ideologically it defined itself as "radical liberal" and federalist. It was merged into Democratic Convergence of Catalonia (CDC) on 27 June 1978.

== History ==
EDC was initially known as the Catalan Liberal Party (PLC) and was a member of the Liberal International. The PLC/EDC was also a part of the Coordinating Commission of Political Forces of Catalonia, the main pro-democracy opposition body of Catalonia at the time. The original ideology of the group was radical liberalism, including federalism, co-management and the nationalization of large enterprises. In April 1976 a sector led by Jaume Casanovas split from the party and founded the Social Democratic Party of Catalonia (PSDC). On 24 September 1976, together with the People's Democratic Party, the Social-Liberal Coalition was established.

In January 1977, the party signed a political alliance with Democratic Convergence of Catalonia (CDC), which ahead of the 1977 Spanish general election would transform into the Democratic Pact for Catalonia (PDC) coalition for the Congress of Deputies, together with CDC, the Socialist Party of Catalonia–Regrouping (PSC–R) and the National Front of Catalonia (FNC). The party would secure two seats out of the eleven won by the alliance, which were occupied by Ramón Trías Fargas and Maciá Alavedra, both for the Barcelona constituency. For the concurrent Spanish Senate election, EDC joined the Democracy and Catalonia coalition, comprising all four PDC parties together with the Catalan Centre (CC) and the Democratic Union of Catalonia (UDC), which won two senators, although none was for EDC.

In December 1977, a group of party members left the party to found the Catalan Association of the Liberal Left, which would end up joining Republican Left of Catalonia (ERC) in August 1978. The rest of the party would be merged into CDC in June 1978.

== Electoral performance ==
=== Cortes Generales ===
==== Nationwide ====
Cortes Generales
Election	Congress					Senate		Leading candidate	Status in legislature
Election	Votes	%	#	Seats	+/–	Seats	+/–	Leading candidate	Status in legislature
1977	Within PDC/DiC			2 / 350	—	0 / 207	—	Jordi Pujol	Opposition

==== Regional breakdown ====
Election	Catalonia						
Election	Congress					Senate	
Election	Votes	%	#	Seats	+/–	Seats	+/–
1977	Within PDC/DiC			2 / 47	—	0 / 16	—
