= Social Democratic Party of Catalonia =

Social Democratic Party of Catalonia Partit Social Demòcrata de Catalunya
- President: Ramon Viñals Soler
- Founder: Jaume Casanovas
- Founded: 29 July 1976
- Dissolved: 1988
- Split from: Democratic Left of Catalonia
- Headquarters: C/ de Aribau, 318.5o. 08006, Barcelona
- Ideology: Catalanism; Social liberalism Social democracy
- Political position: Centre-left

The Social Democratic Party of Catalonia (Catalan: Partit Social Demòcrata de Catalunya, also Partit Socialdemòcrata de Catalunya, PSDC) was a political party in Catalonia, led by Jaume Casanovas and defining itself as left liberal, that split from Democratic Left of Catalonia (EDC) in April 1976 over leadership rather than ideological disagreements. The party would join the Spanish Social Democratic Federation of Francisco Fernández Ordóñez and José Ramón Lasuén.

== History ==
The PSDC was founded by members of the Democratic Left of Catalonia (EDC) leaving the party in April 1976 under Jaume Casanovas, which had been one of EDC's founders and leaders before disagreements over the political leadership of the party resulted in the PSDC's split. The new party was publicly presented on 29 July 1976, and officially registered on 7 March 1977.

In May 1977, the party had planned to coalesce into the Union of the Democratic Centre in Catalonia alliance together with the People's Party of Catalonia (PPC) ahead of the 1977 Spanish general election, but the attempt was aborted by Prime Minister Adolfo Suárez, who instead enforced an electoral list made of independents and without the involvement of the PPC and the PSDC. As a result, both parties announced that they would not be contesting the election.

In March 1978, most party members would leave to join the Union of the Centre of Catalonia, with the remainder of the party joining into a coalition with Republican Left of Catalonia (ERC) and the National Front of Catalonia (FNC) for the March 1979 general election, maintaining the alliance for the April local elections. The PSDC would contest the 1984 and 1988 Catalan regional elections, with little success.

== Electoral performance ==
=== Parliament of Catalonia ===
Parliament of Catalonia
Election	Votes	%	#	Seats	+/–	Leading candidate	Status in legislature
1984	6,768	0.24%	9th	0 / 135	0	Ramon Viñals	No seats
1988	5,156	0.19%	13th	0 / 135	0	Ramon Viñals	No seats
