= Lleida (Parliament of Catalonia constituency) =

Coordinates: 42°00′N 1°10′W

- Parliament of Catalonia; Electoral constituency
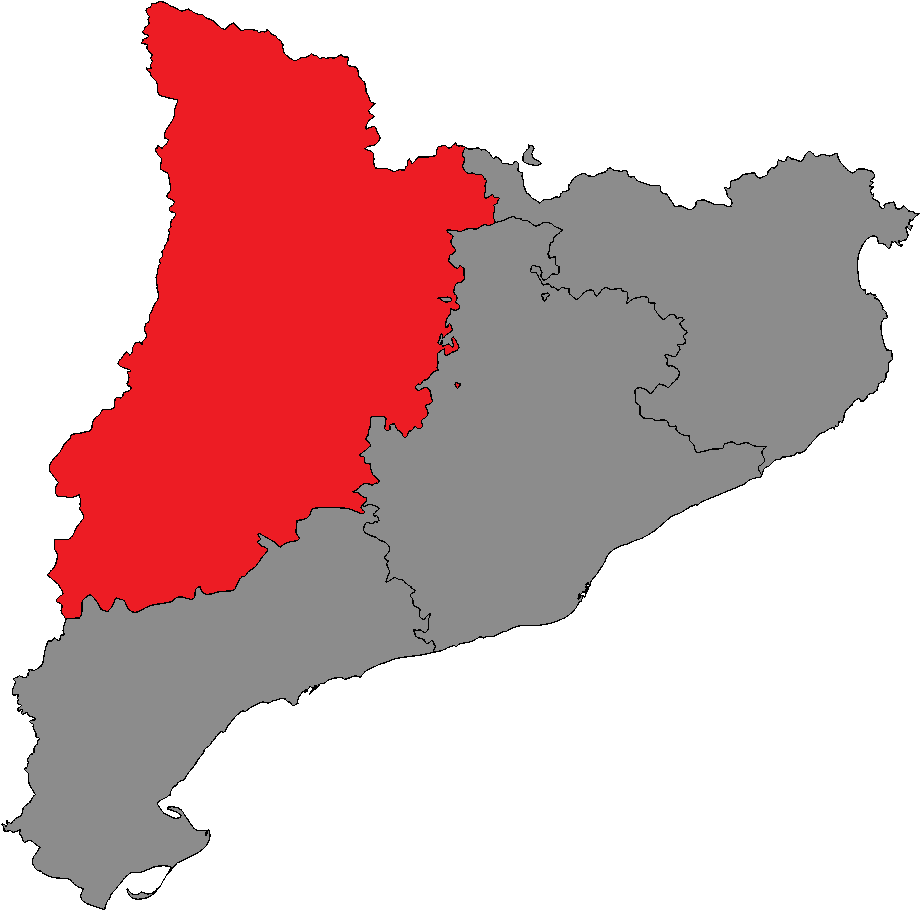
- Location of Lleida within Catalonia
- Province: Lleida
- Autonomous community: Catalonia
- Population: ▲451,197 (2024)
- Electorate: ▲318,856 (2024)
- Major settlements: Lleida

Current constituency
- Created: 1980
- Seats: 15
- Members: Cat–Junts+ (5); PSC (4); ERC (3); PP (1); Aliança.cat (1); Vox (1)

Lleida (Spanish: Lérida) is one of the four constituencies (Spanish: circunscripciones) represented in the Parliament of Catalonia, the regional legislature of the autonomous community of Catalonia. The constituency currently elects 15 deputies. Its boundaries correspond to those of the Spanish province of Lleida. The electoral system uses the D'Hondt method and closed-list proportional representation, with a minimum threshold of three percent.

== Electoral system ==
The constituency was created as per the Statute of Autonomy of Catalonia of 1979 and was first contested in the 1980 regional election. The Statute requires for an electoral law to be passed by a two-thirds supermajority in the Parliament of Catalonia, but transitory provisions provide for the four provinces in Catalonia—Barcelona, Girona, Lleida and Tarragona—to be established as multi-member districts in the Parliament. Each constituency is allocated a fixed number of seats: 85 for Barcelona, 17 for Girona, 15 for Lleida and 18 for Tarragona.

Voting is on the basis of universal suffrage, which comprises all nationals over eighteen, registered in Catalonia and in full enjoyment of their political rights. Amendments to the electoral law in 2011 required for Catalans abroad to apply for voting before being permitted to vote, a system known as "begged" or expat vote (Spanish: Voto rogado) which was abolished in 2022. Seats are elected using the D'Hondt method and a closed list proportional representation, with an electoral threshold of three percent of valid votes—which includes blank ballots—being applied in each constituency. The use of the D'Hondt method may result in a higher effective threshold, depending on the district magnitude.

The electoral law allows for parties and federations registered in the interior ministry, coalitions and groupings of electors to present lists of candidates. Parties and federations intending to form a coalition ahead of an election are required to inform the relevant Electoral Commission within ten days of the election call—fifteen before 1985—whereas groupings of electors need to secure the signature of at least one percent of the electorate in the constituencies for which they seek election—one-thousandth of the electorate, with a compulsory minimum of 500 signatures, until 1985—disallowing electors from signing for more than one list of candidates.

== Deputies ==
Deputies 1980–present
Key to parties CUP JxSí PSUC ICV–EUiA ERC/ERC–CatSí PSC JxCat/Junts JuntsxCat Cs CiU CC–UCD PP CP AP Aliança.cat Vox
Parliament	Election	Distribution
1st	1980	1 / 2 / 3 / 5 / 4
2nd	1984	1 / 3 / 10 / 1
3rd	1988	1 / 4 / 9 / 1
4th	1992	1 / 4 / 9 / 1
5th	1995	2 / 3 / 8 / 2
6th	1999	1 / 5 / 8 / 1
7th	2003	3 / 4 / 7 / 1
8th	2006	1 / 3 / 3 / 7 / 1
9th	2010	1 / 3 / 9 / 2
10th	2012	1 / 3 / 1 / 8 / 2
11th	2015	1 / 10 / 1 / 2 / 1
12th	2017	5 / 1 / 6 / 3
13/14th	2021	1 / 5 / 3 / 5 / 1
15th	2024	3 / 4 / 5 / 1 / 1 / 1

== Regional elections ==
=== 2024 ===
Summary of the 12 May 2024 Parliament of Catalonia election results in Lleida
Parties and alliances	Popular vote			Seats	
Parties and alliances	Votes	%	±pp	Total	+/−
Together+Carles Puigdemont for Catalonia (Cat–Junts+)	51,125	30.34	+2.30	5	±0
Socialists' Party of Catalonia (PSC–PSOE)	34,748	20.62	+5.60	4	+1
Republican Left of Catalonia (ERC)	27,523	16.34	–10.23	3	–2
People's Party (PP)	15,472	9.18	+5.63	1	+1
Catalan Alliance (Aliança.cat)	13,058	7.75	New	1	+1
Vox (Vox)	10,508	6.24	+0.71	1	±0
Popular Unity Candidacy–Let's Defend the Land (CUP–DT)	7,148	4.24	–3.15	0	–1
Commons Unite (Comuns Sumar)^{1}	3,653	2.17	–1.06	0	±0
At the Same Time (Alhora)^{2}	830	0.49	+0.25	0	±0
Citizens–Party of the Citizenry (Cs)	553	0.33	–2.89	0	±0
Workers' Front (FO)	365	0.22	New	0	±0
For a Fairer World (PUM+J)	250	0.15	–0.04	0	±0
Communist Party of the Workers of Catalonia (PCTC)	209	0.12	–0.01	0	±0
Zero Cuts (Recortes Cero)	202	0.12	–0.10	0	±0
National Front of Catalonia (FNC)	110	0.07	–0.17	0	±0
Blank ballots	2,734	1.62	+0.41		
Total	168,488			15	±0
Valid votes	168,488	98.69	+0.59		
Invalid votes	2,238	1.31	–0.59		
Votes cast / turnout	170,726	53.54	+1.62		
Abstentions	148,130	46.46	–1.62		
Registered voters	318,856				
Sources
Footnotes: ^{1} Commons Unite results are compared to In Common We Can–We Can In Common totals in the 2021 election.; ^{2} At the Same Time results are compared to Primaries for the Independence of Catalonia Movement totals in the 2021 election.

=== 2021 ===
Summary of the 14 February 2021 Parliament of Catalonia election results in Lleida
Parties and alliances	Popular vote			Seats	
Parties and alliances	Votes	%	±pp	Total	+/−
Together for Catalonia (JxCat)^{1}	45,029	28.04	n/a	5	+2
Republican Left of Catalonia (ERC)	42,670	26.57	–0.15	5	±0
Socialists' Party of Catalonia (PSC–PSOE)	24,115	15.02	+5.98	3	+2
Popular Unity Candidacy–A New Cycle to Win (CUP–G)	11,871	7.39	+2.35	1	+1
Vox (Vox)	8,876	5.53	New	1	+1
Catalan European Democratic Party (PDeCAT)^{1}	7,365	4.59	n/a	0	–3
People's Party (PP)	5,695	3.55	–0.97	0	±0
In Common We Can–We Can In Common (ECP–PEC)^{2}	5,189	3.23	–0.68	0	±0
Citizens–Party of the Citizenry (Cs)	5,175	3.22	–13.75	0	–3
Blank Seats (EB)	591	0.37	New	0	±0
National Front of Catalonia (FNC)	388	0.24	New	0	±0
Primaries for the Independence of Catalonia Movement (MPIC)	388	0.24	New	0	±0
Zero Cuts–Green Group–Municipalists (Recortes Cero–GV–M)	356	0.22	+0.09	0	±0
For a Fairer World (PUM+J)	302	0.19	+0.05	0	±0
Nationalist Party of Catalonia (PNC)	232	0.14	New	0	±0
Communist Party of the Workers of Catalonia (PCTC)	214	0.13	New	0	±0
Catalan Civil Support (SCAT)	137	0.09	New	0	±0
Left in Positive (IZQP)	59	0.04	New	0	±0
Blank ballots	1,940	1.21	+0.65		
Total	160,592			15	±0
Valid votes	160,592	98.10	–1.49		
Invalid votes	3,111	1.90	+1.49		
Votes cast / turnout	163,703	51.92	–25.19		
Abstentions	151,594	48.08	+25.19		
Registered voters	315,297				
Sources
Footnotes: ^{1} Within the Together for Catalonia alliance in the 2017 election.; ^{2} In Common We Can–We Can In Common results are compared to Catalonia in Common–We Can totals in the 2017 election.

=== 2017 ===
Summary of the 21 December 2017 Parliament of Catalonia election results in Lleida
Parties and alliances	Popular vote			Seats	
Parties and alliances	Votes	%	±pp	Total	+/−
Together for Catalonia (JuntsxCat)^{1}	78,303	32.48	n/a	6	±0
Republican Left–Catalonia Yes (ERC–CatSí)^{1}	64,417	26.72	n/a	5	+2
Citizens–Party of the Citizenry (Cs)	40,908	16.97	+5.39	3	+1
Socialists' Party of Catalonia (PSC–PSOE)	21,795	9.04	+0.61	1	±0
Popular Unity Candidacy (CUP)	12,140	5.04	–3.11	0	–1
People's Party (PP)	10,902	4.52	–2.77	0	–1
Catalonia in Common–We Can (CatComú–Podem)^{2}	9,415	3.91	–0.39	0	±0
Animalist Party Against Mistreatment of Animals (PACMA)	1,186	0.49	+0.03	0	±0
For a Fairer World (PUM+J)	336	0.14	New	0	±0
Zero Cuts–Green Group (Recortes Cero–GV)	312	0.13	–0.04	0	±0
Republican Dialogue (Diàleg)	0	0.00	New	0	±0
Together for Yes (Independents) (JxSí)^{1}	n/a	n/a	n/a	0	–1
Blank ballots	1,341	0.56	–0.19		
Total	241,055			15	±0
Valid votes	241,055	99.59	+0.10		
Invalid votes	1,002	0.41	–0.10		
Votes cast / turnout	242,057	77.11	+3.48		
Abstentions	71,861	22.89	–3.48		
Registered voters	313,918				
Sources
Footnotes: ^{1} Within the Junts pel Sí alliance in the 2015 election. Totals for JuntsxCat are compared to CDC. Totals for ERC–CatSí include DC and MES. Also including JuntsxCat and ERC aligned independents from 2015.; ^{2} Catalonia in Common–We Can results are compared to Catalonia Yes We Can totals in the 2015 election.

=== 2015 ===
Summary of the 27 September 2015 Parliament of Catalonia election results in Lleida
Parties and alliances	Popular vote			Seats	
Parties and alliances	Votes	%	±pp	Total	+/−
Together for Yes (JxSí)^{1}	126,922	55.22	–5.24	10	–1
Citizens–Party of the Citizenry (C's)	26,612	11.58	+8.25	2	+2
Socialists' Party of Catalonia (PSC–PSOE)	19,364	8.43	–2.01	1	±0
Popular Unity Candidacy (CUP)	18,736	8.15	+5.10	1	+1
People's Party (PP)	16,761	7.29	–4.00	1	–1
Catalonia Yes We Can (CatSíqueesPot)^{2}	9,879	4.30	–1.09	0	–1
Democratic Union of Catalonia (unio.cat)	8,178	3.56	New	0	±0
Animalist Party Against Mistreatment of Animals (PACMA)	1,046	0.46	+0.10	0	±0
Zero Cuts–The Greens (Recortes Cero–EV)	391	0.17	New	0	±0
Let's Win Catalonia (Ganemos)	221	0.10	New	0	±0
Blank ballots	1,723	0.75	–1.26		
Total	229,833			15	±0
Valid votes	229,833	99.49	+0.61		
Invalid votes	1,171	0.51	–0.61		
Votes cast / turnout	231,004	73.63	+6.85		
Abstentions	82,739	26.37	–6.85		
Registered voters	313,743				
Sources
Footnotes: ^{1} Junts pel Sí results are compared to the combined totals of Convergence and Union and Republican Left of Catalonia in the 2012 election.; ^{2} Catalonia Yes We Can results are compared to Initiative for Catalonia Greens–United and Alternative Left totals in the 2012 election.

=== 2012 ===
Summary of the 25 November 2012 Parliament of Catalonia election results in Lleida
Parties and alliances	Popular vote			Seats	
Parties and alliances	Votes	%	±pp	Total	+/−
Convergence and Union (CiU)	89,035	43.05	–3.88	8	–1
Republican Left of Catalonia–Catalonia Yes (ERC–CatSí)	36,011	17.41	+8.26	3	+2
People's Party (PP)	23,338	11.29	+1.07	2	±0
Socialists' Party of Catalonia (PSC–PSOE)	21,598	10.44	–4.36	1	–2
Initiative for Catalonia Greens–United and Alternative Left (ICV–EUiA)	11,145	5.39	+1.39	1	+1
Citizens–Party of the Citizenry (C's)	6,881	3.33	+1.84	0	±0
Popular Unity Candidacy–Left Alternative (CUP)	6,302	3.05	New	0	±0
Catalan Solidarity for Independence (SI)	3,038	1.47	–1.63	0	±0
Blank Seats (EB)	1,417	0.69	+0.11	0	±0
Platform for Catalonia (PxC)	1,224	0.59	–1.19	0	±0
Animalist Party Against Mistreatment of Animals (PACMA)	752	0.36	+0.09	0	±0
Pirates of Catalonia (Pirata.cat)	642	0.31	+0.12	0	±0
Hartos.org (Hartos.org)	476	0.23	New	0	±0
Union, Progress and Democracy (UPyD)	393	0.19	+0.14	0	±0
Republican Left (IR)	301	0.15	New	0	±0
Communist Unification of Spain (UCE)	90	0.04	+0.02	0	±0
Blank ballots	4,153	2.01	–1.53		
Total	206,796			15	±0
Valid votes	206,796	98.88	–0.23		
Invalid votes	2,347	1.12	+0.23		
Votes cast / turnout	209,143	66.78	+6.91		
Abstentions	104,031	33.22	–6.91		
Registered voters	313,174				

=== 2010 ===
Summary of the 28 November 2010 Parliament of Catalonia election results in Lleida
Parties and alliances	Popular vote			Seats	
Parties and alliances	Votes	%	±pp	Total	+/−
Convergence and Union (CiU)	87,052	46.93	+6.94	9	+2
Socialists' Party of Catalonia (PSC–PSOE)	27,461	14.80	–7.19	3	±0
People's Party (PP)	18,960	10.22	+1.11	2	+1
Republican Left of Catalonia (ERC)	16,966	9.15	–8.57	1	–2
Initiative for Catalonia Greens–United and Alternative Left (ICV–EUiA)	7,423	4.00	–2.59	0	–1
Catalan Solidarity for Independence (SI)	5,758	3.10	New	0	±0
Independence Rally (RI.cat)	4,205	2.27	New	0	±0
Platform for Catalonia (PxC)	3,295	1.78	New	0	±0
Citizens–Party of the Citizenry (C's)	2,757	1.49	+0.52	0	±0
Blank Seats–Citizens for Blank Votes (EB–CenB)^{1}	1,071	0.58	+0.39	0	±0
The Greens–European Green Group (EV–GVE)	648	0.35	New	0	±0
Anti-Bullfighting Party Against Mistreatment of Animals (PACMA)	494	0.27	–0.03	0	±0
From Below (Des de Baix)	490	0.26	New	0	±0
Pirates of Catalonia (Pirata.cat)	353	0.19	New	0	±0
Party for Catalonia (PxCAT)	314	0.17	New	0	±0
Communist Party of the Catalan People (PCPC)	251	0.14	+0.01	0	±0
Reus Independent Coordinator (CORI)	249	0.13	New	0	±0
Pensioners in Action Party (PDLPEA)	216	0.12	New	0	±0
Catalan Sovereigntist Bloc (Bloc SC)	187	0.10	New	0	±0
Family and Life Party (PFiV)	125	0.07	–0.04	0	±0
For a Fairer World (PUM+J)	122	0.07	+0.06	0	±0
Aragonese Party (PAR)	98	0.05	New	0	±0
Union, Progress and Democracy (UPyD)	94	0.05	New	0	±0
Spanish Phalanx of the CNSO (FE de las JONS)	89	0.05	New	0	±0
Democratic and Social Centre (CDS)	57	0.03	New	0	±0
Humanist Party (PH)	52	0.03	–0.06	0	±0
Progress and Justice Party (PJP)	49	0.03	New	0	±0
Republican Social Movement (MSR)	47	0.03	±0.00	0	±0
Communist Unification of Spain (UCE)	46	0.02	New	0	±0
Blank ballots	6,565	3.51	+1.24		
Total	185,494			15	±0
Valid votes	185,494	99.11	–0.13		
Invalid votes	1,665	0.89	+0.13		
Votes cast / turnout	187,159	59.87	+0.87		
Abstentions	125,446	40.13	–0.87		
Registered voters	312,605				
Sources
Footnotes: ^{1} Blank Seats–Citizens for Blank Votes results are compared to Unsubmissive Seats–Alternative of Discontented Democrats totals in the 2006 election.

=== 2006 ===
Summary of the 1 November 2006 Parliament of Catalonia election results in Lleida
Parties and alliances	Popular vote			Seats	
Parties and alliances	Votes	%	±pp	Total	+/−
Convergence and Union (CiU)	72,916	39.99	–1.45	7	±0
Socialists' Party of Catalonia–Citizens for Change (PSC–CpC)	40,097	21.99	–0.46	3	–1
Republican Left of Catalonia (ERC)	32,304	17.72	–2.20	3	±0
People's Party (PP)	16,605	9.11	–0.56	1	±0
Initiative for Catalonia Greens–United and Alternative Left (ICV–EUiA)	12,018	6.59	+2.24	1	+1
Citizens–Party of the Citizenry (C's)	1,761	0.97	New	0	±0
Anti-Bullfighting Party Against Mistreatment of Animals (PACMA)	550	0.30	New	0	±0
Unsubmissive Seats–Alternative of Discontented Democrats (Ei–ADD)	344	0.19	New	0	±0
Internationalist Socialist Workers' Party (POSI)	290	0.16	±0.00	0	±0
For a Fairer World (PUM+J)	240	0.13	New	0	±0
Communist Party of the Catalan People (PCPC)	238	0.13	+0.04	0	±0
Republican Left–Left Republican Party (IR–PRE)	222	0.12	–0.15	0	±0
Family and Life Party (PFiV)	200	0.11	New	0	±0
Humanist Party of Catalonia (PHC)	168	0.09	+0.02	0	±0
Forward Catalonia Platform (AES–DN)	148	0.08	New	0	±0
Republican Social Movement (MSR)	56	0.03	New	0	±0
Blank ballots	4,166	2.28	+1.30		
Total	182,323			15	±0
Valid votes	182,323	99.34	–0.22		
Invalid votes	1,203	0.66	+0.22		
Votes cast / turnout	183,526	59.00	–6.47		
Abstentions	127,511	41.00	+6.47		
Registered voters	311,037				

=== 2003 ===
Summary of the 16 November 2003 Parliament of Catalonia election results in Lleida
Parties and alliances	Popular vote			Seats	
Parties and alliances	Votes	%	±pp	Total	+/−
Convergence and Union (CiU)	84,410	41.44	–6.66	7	–1
Socialists' Party of Catalonia–Citizens for Change (PSC–CpC)	45,723	22.45	–7.06	4	–1
Republican Left of Catalonia (ERC)	40,574	19.92	+8.31	3	+2
People's Party (PP)	19,690	9.67	+1.70	1	±0
Initiative for Catalonia Greens–Alternative Left (ICV–EA)^{1}	8,863	4.35	+3.86	0	±0
Platform for Catalonia (PxC)	650	0.32	New	0	±0
Republican Left–Left Republican Party (IR–PRE)	544	0.27	New	0	±0
Internationalist Socialist Workers' Party (POSI)	333	0.16	New	0	±0
Catalan State (EC)	251	0.12	+0.02	0	±0
Communist Party of the Catalan People (PCPC)	177	0.09	New	0	±0
Another Democracy is Possible (UADeP)	175	0.09	New	0	±0
Humanist Party of Catalonia (PHC)	143	0.07	+0.01	0	±0
Caló Nationalist Party (PNCA)	79	0.04	New	0	±0
Internationalist Struggle (LI (LIT–CI))	58	0.03	+0.01	0	±0
Blank ballots	1,998	0.98	–0.06		
Total	203,668			15	±0
Valid votes	203,668	99.56	–0.07		
Invalid votes	891	0.44	+0.07		
Votes cast / turnout	204,559	65.47	+4.66		
Abstentions	107,879	34.53	–4.66		
Registered voters	312,438				
Sources
Footnotes: ^{1} Initiative for Catalonia Greens–Alternative Left results are compared to United and Alternative Left totals in the 1999 election.

=== 1999 ===
Summary of the 17 October 1999 Parliament of Catalonia election results in Lleida
Parties and alliances	Popular vote			Seats	
Parties and alliances	Votes	%	±pp	Total	+/−
Convergence and Union (CiU)	91,199	48.10	–1.62	8	±0
Socialists' Party–Citizens for Change–Initiative–Greens (PSC–CpC–IC–V)^{1}	55,963	29.51	+5.87	5	+2
Republican Left of Catalonia (ERC)	22,011	11.61	–1.21	1	–1
People's Party (PP)	15,121	7.97	–4.24	1	–1
The Greens–Ecologist Confederation of Catalonia (EV–CEC)^{2}	1,232	0.65	n/a	0	±0
United and Alternative Left (EUiA)^{2}	927	0.49	n/a	0	±0
The Greens–Green Alternative (EV–AV)	661	0.35	New	0	±0
Bounced Public Workers (TPR)	198	0.10	New	0	±0
Catalan State (EC)	187	0.10	New	0	±0
Humanist Party of Catalonia (PHC)	108	0.06	New	0	±0
Internationalist Struggle (LI (LIT–CI))	43	0.02	New	0	±0
Blank ballots	1,964	1.04	±0.00		
Total	189,614			15	±0
Valid votes	189,614	99.63	–0.03		
Invalid votes	695	0.37	+0.03		
Votes cast / turnout	190,309	60.81	–5.78		
Abstentions	122,652	39.19	+5.78		
Registered voters	312,961				
Sources
Footnotes: ^{1} Socialists' Party–Citizens for Change–Initiative–Greens results are compared to the combined totals of the Socialists' Party of Catalonia and Initiative for Catalonia–The Greens in the 1995 election.; ^{2} Within the Initiative for Catalonia–The Greens alliance in the 1995 election.

=== 1995 ===
Summary of the 19 November 1995 Parliament of Catalonia election results in Lleida
Parties and alliances	Popular vote			Seats	
Parties and alliances	Votes	%	±pp	Total	+/−
Convergence and Union (CiU)	98,995	49.72	–3.88	8	–1
Socialists' Party of Catalonia (PSC–PSOE)	38,796	19.48	–2.35	3	–1
Republican Left of Catalonia (ERC)	25,533	12.82	+3.03	2	+1
People's Party (PP)	24,319	12.21	+5.34	2	+1
Initiative for Catalonia–The Greens (IC–EV)^{1}	8,282	4.16	–0.13	0	±0
Ecologist Alternative of Catalonia (AEC)	798	0.40	New	0	±0
Revolutionary Workers' Party (POR)	196	0.10	+0.02	0	±0
Spanish Phalanx of the CNSO (FE–JONS)	137	0.07	New	0	±0
Blank ballots	2,066	1.04	–0.24		
Total	199,122			15	±0
Valid votes	199,122	99.66	+0.21		
Invalid votes	671	0.34	–0.21		
Votes cast / turnout	199,793	66.59	+6.47		
Abstentions	100,230	33.41	–6.47		
Registered voters	300,023				
Sources
Footnotes: ^{1} Initiative for Catalonia–The Greens results are compared to the combined totals of Initiative for Catalonia, Green Alternative–Ecologist Movement of Catalonia and Party of the Communists of Catalonia in the 1992 election.

=== 1992 ===
Summary of the 15 March 1992 Parliament of Catalonia election results in Lleida
Parties and alliances	Popular vote			Seats	
Parties and alliances	Votes	%	±pp	Total	+/−
Convergence and Union (CiU)	92,210	53.60	–0.21	9	±0
Socialists' Party of Catalonia (PSC–PSOE)	37,551	21.83	–1.22	4	±0
Republican Left of Catalonia (ERC)	16,839	9.79	+3.89	1	±0
People's Party (PP)^{1}	11,824	6.87	+0.69	1	±0
Initiative for Catalonia (IC)	4,946	2.87	–0.71	0	±0
Green Alternative–Ecologist Movement of Catalonia (AV–MEC)	1,831	1.06	+0.32	0	±0
Democratic and Social Centre (CDS)	1,247	0.72	–3.57	0	±0
Ruiz-Mateos Group (ARM)	934	0.54	New	0	±0
Party of the Communists of Catalonia (PCC)	611	0.36	New	0	±0
Workers' Socialist Party (PST)	600	0.35	+0.09	0	±0
Lleida Republican Youth (JRLL)	431	0.25	New	0	±0
Free Catalonia (CLL)	390	0.23	New	0	±0
Humanist Party (PH)	144	0.08	–0.07	0	±0
Revolutionary Workers' Party of Spain (PORE)	141	0.08	–0.05	0	±0
Independent Socialists (SI)^{2}	135	0.08	+0.04	0	±0
Blank ballots	2,203	1.28	+0.52		
Total	172,037			15	±0
Valid votes	172,037	99.45	–0.01		
Invalid votes	954	0.55	+0.01		
Votes cast / turnout	172,991	60.12	–1.09		
Abstentions	114,737	39.88	+1.09		
Registered voters	287,728				
Sources
Footnotes: ^{1} People's Party results are compared to People's Alliance totals in the 1988 election.; ^{2} Independent Socialists results are compared to Alliance for the Republic totals in the 1988 election.

=== 1988 ===
Summary of the 29 May 1988 Parliament of Catalonia election results in Lérida
Parties and alliances	Popular vote			Seats	
Parties and alliances	Votes	%	±pp	Total	+/−
Convergence and Union (CiU)	91,381	53.81	–3.91	9	–1
Socialists' Party of Catalonia (PSC–PSOE)^{1}	39,144	23.05	+2.68	4	+1
People's Alliance (AP)^{2}	10,487	6.18	–2.66	1	±0
Republican Left of Catalonia (ERC)	10,014	5.90	+0.19	1	±0
Democratic and Social Centre (CDS)	7,285	4.29	New	0	±0
Initiative for Catalonia (IC)^{3}	6,080	3.58	–2.04	0	±0
Green Alternative–Ecologist Movement of Catalonia (AV–MEC)	1,265	0.74	New	0	±0
The Ecologist Greens (EVE)	645	0.38	New	0	±0
The Greens (EV)	510	0.30	New	0	±0
Workers' Socialist Party (PST)	445	0.26	+0.08	0	±0
Humanist Party of Catalonia (PHC)	250	0.15	New	0	±0
Revolutionary Workers' Party of Spain (PORE)	225	0.13	+0.03	0	±0
Communist Unification of Spain (UCE)	153	0.09	New	0	±0
Spanish Juntas (JJEE)	151	0.09	New	0	±0
Communist Workers' League (LOC)	127	0.07	New	0	±0
Republican Popular Unity (UPR)^{4}	118	0.07	New	0	±0
Andalusian Party of Catalonia (PAC)	106	0.06	New	0	±0
Centrist Unity–Democratic Spanish Party (PED)	73	0.04	New	0	±0
Alliance for the Republic (AxR)^{5}	68	0.04	–0.10	0	±0
Blank ballots	1,294	0.76	+0.17		
Total	169,821			15	±0
Valid votes	169,821	99.46	–0.09		
Invalid votes	918	0.54	+0.09		
Votes cast / turnout	170,739	61.21	–3.39		
Abstentions	108,211	38.79	+3.39		
Registered voters	278,950				
Sources
Footnotes: ^{1} Socialists' Party of Catalonia results are compared to the combined totals of Socialists' Party of Catalonia and Unity of Aran–Aranese Nationalist Party in the 1984 election.; ^{2} People's Alliance results are compared to People's Coalition totals in the 1984 election.; ^{3} Initiative for Catalonia results are compared to the combined totals of Unified Socialist Party of Catalonia, Agreement of the Catalan Left and Party of the Communists of Catalonia in the 1984 election.; ^{4} Republican Popular Unity results are compared to Communist Party of Spain (Marxist–Leninist) totals in the 1984 election.; ^{5} Alliance for the Republic results are compared to Internationalist Socialist Workers' Party totals in the 1984 election.

=== 1984 ===
Summary of the 29 April 1984 Parliament of Catalonia election results in Lérida
Parties and alliances	Popular vote			Seats	
Parties and alliances	Votes	%	±pp	Total	+/−
Convergence and Union (CiU)	102,839	57.72	+29.48	10	+5
Socialists' Party of Catalonia (PSC–PSOE)	35,506	19.93	+0.66	3	±0
People's Coalition (AP–PDP–UL)	15,751	8.84	New	1	+1
Republican Left of Catalonia (ERC)	10,171	5.71	–6.52	1	–1
Unified Socialist Party of Catalonia (PSUC)	4,964	2.79	–7.82	0	–1
Agreement of the Catalan Left (EEC)^{1}	2,913	1.63	–0.17	0	±0
Party of the Communists of Catalonia (PCC)^{2}	2,145	1.20	+0.80	0	±0
Party of Lleida (PLL)	856	0.48	New	0	±0
Unity of Aran–Aranese Nationalist Party (UA–PNA)	787	0.44	New	0	±0
Social Democratic Party of Catalonia (PSDC)	328	0.18	New	0	±0
Workers' Socialist Party (PST)	312	0.18	New	0	±0
Internationalist Socialist Workers' Party (POSI)	242	0.14	New	0	±0
Revolutionary Workers' Party of Spain (PORE)	173	0.10	New	0	±0
Revolutionary Communist League (LCR)	136	0.08	New	0	±0
Communist Movement of Catalonia (MCC)^{3}	0	0.00	–0.67	0	±0
Centrists of Catalonia (CC–UCD)	n/a	n/a	–23.39	0	–4
Blank ballots	1,060	0.59	+0.02		
Total	178,183			15	±0
Valid votes	178,183	99.55	±0.00		
Invalid votes	799	0.45	±0.00		
Votes cast / turnout	178,982	64.60	+5.24		
Abstentions	98,101	35.40	–5.24		
Registered voters	277,083				
Sources
Footnotes: ^{1} Agreement of the Catalan Left results are compared to Left Nationalists totals in the 1980 election.; ^{2} Party of the Communists of Catalonia results are compared to Communist Unity totals in the 1980 election.; ^{3} Communist Movement of Catalonia results are compared to Unity for Socialism totals in the 1980 election.

=== 1980 ===
Summary of the 20 March 1980 Parliament of Catalonia election results in Lérida
Parties and alliances	Popular vote			Seats	
Parties and alliances	Votes	%	±pp	Total	+/−
Convergence and Union (CiU)	45,162	28.24	n/a	5	n/a
Centrists of Catalonia (CC–UCD)	37,405	23.39	n/a	4	n/a
Socialists' Party of Catalonia (PSC–PSOE)	30,812	19.27	n/a	3	n/a
Republican Left of Catalonia (ERC)	19,565	12.23	n/a	2	n/a
Unified Socialist Party of Catalonia (PSUC)	16,968	10.61	n/a	1	n/a
Left Nationalists (NE)	2,880	1.80	n/a	0	n/a
New Force (FN)	2,075	1.30	n/a	0	n/a
Unity for Socialism (CUPS)	1,070	0.67	n/a	0	n/a
Socialist Party of Andalusia–Andalusian Party (PSA–PA)	1,062	0.66	n/a	0	n/a
Left Bloc for National Liberation (BEAN)	765	0.48	n/a	0	n/a
Communist Unity (UC)	636	0.40	n/a	0	n/a
Spanish Phalanx of the CNSO (FE–JONS)	608	0.38	n/a	0	n/a
Blank ballots	914	0.57	n/a		
Total	159,922			15	n/a
Valid votes	159,922	99.55	n/a		
Invalid votes	722	0.45	n/a		
Votes cast / turnout	160,644	59.36	n/a		
Abstentions	110,003	40.64	n/a		
Registered voters	270,647				
