= 1995 Catalan regional election =

Election in the Spanish region of Catalonia

- 19 November 1995

All 135 seats in the Parliament of Catalonia 68 seats needed for a majority
- Opinion polls
- Registered: 5,079,981 ▲5.0%
- Turnout: 3,232,959 (63.6%) ▲8.7 pp
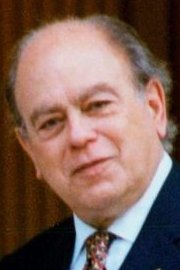

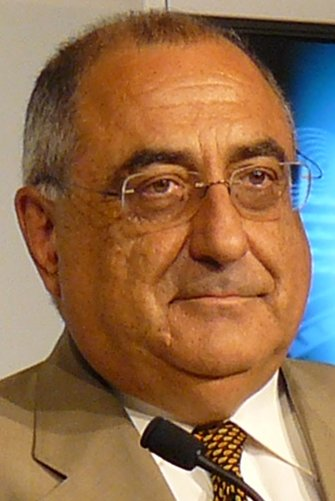

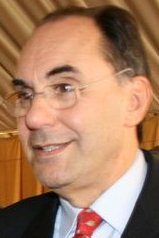

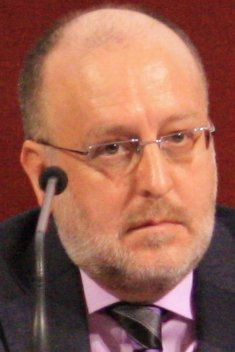

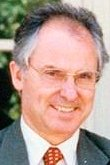
	First party	Second party	Third party
Leader	Jordi Pujol	Joaquim Nadal	Alejo Vidal-Quadras
Party	CiU	PSC–PSOE	PP
Leader since	17 November 1974	22 July 1995	9 January 1991
Leader's seat	Barcelona	Barcelona	Barcelona
Last election	70 seats, 46.2%	40 seats, 27.5%	7 seats, 6.0%
Seats won	60	34	17
Seat change	▼10	▼6	▲10
Popular vote	1,320,071	802,252	421,752
Percentage	40.9%	24.9%	13.1%
Swing	▼5.3 pp	▼2.6 pp	▲7.1 pp
	Fourth party	Fifth party
Leader	Àngel Colom	Rafael Ribó
Party	ERC	IC–EV
Leader since	19 November 1989	23 February 1987
Leader's seat	Barcelona	Barcelona
Last election	11 seats, 8.0%	7 seats, 7.7% (Note: Results for IC (6.5%, 7 seats), PCC (0.8%, 0 seats) and AV–MEC (0.4%, 0 seats) in the 1992 election.)
Seats won	13	11
Seat change	▲2	▲4
Popular vote	305,867	313,092
Percentage	9.5%	9.7%
Swing	▲1.5 pp	▲2.0 pp
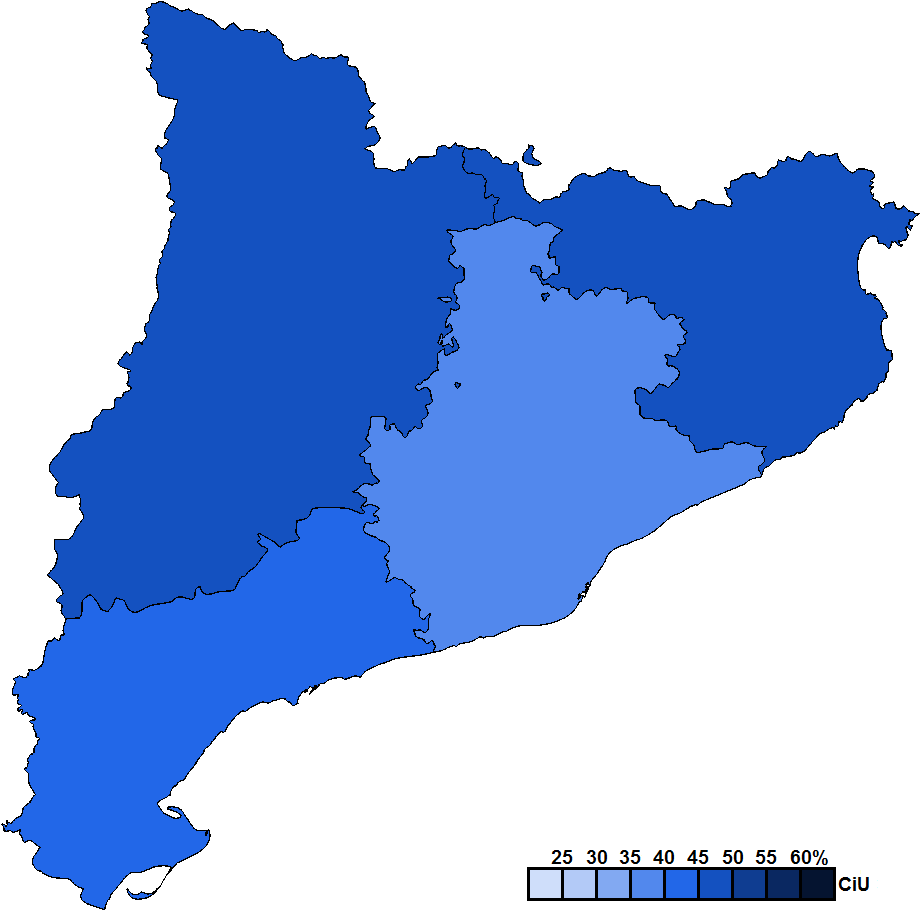
President before election
Jordi Pujol
CDC (CiU)
President after election
Jordi Pujol
CDC (CiU)

A regional election was held in Catalonia on 19 November 1995 to elect the 5th Parliament of the autonomous community. All 135 seats in the Parliament were up for election.

== Overview ==
Under the 1979 Statute of Autonomy, the Parliament of Catalonia was the unicameral legislature of the homonymous autonomous community, having legislative power in devolved matters, as well as the ability to grant or withdraw confidence from a regional president. The electoral and procedural rules were supplemented by national law provisions.

=== Date ===
The term of the Parliament of Catalonia expired four years after the date of its previous election, unless it was dissolved earlier. The election was required to be called no later than 15 days before the scheduled expiration date of parliament, with election day taking place within 60 days from the call. The previous election was held on 15 March 1992, which meant that the chamber's term would have expired on 15 March 1996. The election was required to be called no later than 29 February 1996, setting the latest possible date for election day on 29 April 1996.

The regional president had the prerogative to dissolve the Parliament of Catalonia at any given time and call a snap election, provided that no motion of no confidence was in process and that dissolution did not occur before one year after a previous one under this procedure. In the event of an investiture process failing to elect a regional president within a two-month period from the first ballot, the Parliament was to be automatically dissolved and a fresh election called.

The Parliament of Catalonia was officially dissolved on 26 September 1995 with the publication of the corresponding decree in the Official Journal of the Government of Catalonia (DOGC), setting election day for 19 November.

=== Electoral system ===
Voting for the Parliament was based on universal suffrage, comprising all Spanish nationals over 18 years of age, registered in Catalonia and with full political rights, provided that they had not been deprived of the right to vote by a final sentence, nor were legally incapacitated.

The Parliament of Catalonia had a minimum of 100 and a maximum of 150 seats, with electoral provisions fixing its size at 135. All were elected in four multi-member constituencies—corresponding to the provinces of Barcelona, Girona, Lleida and Tarragona, each of which was assigned a fixed number of seats—using the D'Hondt method and closed-list proportional voting, with a three percent-threshold of valid votes (including blank ballots) in each constituency. The use of this electoral method resulted in a higher effective threshold depending on district magnitude and vote distribution.

As a result of the aforementioned allocation, each Parliament constituency was entitled the following seats:

Seats	Constituencies
85	Barcelona
18	Tarragona
17	Girona
15	Lleida

The law did not provide for by-elections to fill vacant seats; instead, any vacancies arising after the proclamation of candidates and during the legislative term were filled by the next candidates on the party lists or, when required, by designated substitutes.

== Parties and candidates ==
The electoral law allowed for parties and federations registered in the interior ministry, alliances and groupings of electors to present lists of candidates. Parties and federations intending to form an alliance were required to inform the relevant electoral commission within 10 days of the election call, whereas groupings of electors needed to secure the signature of at least one percent of the electorate in the constituencies for which they sought election, disallowing electors from signing for more than one list.

Below is a list of the main parties and alliances which contested the election:

Candidacy	Parties and alliances	Leading candidate	Ideology	Previous result		Gov.	Ref.
Candidacy	Parties and alliances	Leading candidate	Ideology	Vote %	Seats	Gov.	Ref.
CiU	List: Democratic Convergence of Catalonia (CDC); Democratic Union of Catalonia (UDC)	Jordi Pujol	Catalan nationalism Centrism	46.2%	70	Yes	
PSC–PSOE	List: Socialists' Party of Catalonia (PSC–PSOE)	Joaquim Nadal	Social democracy	27.5%	40	No	
ERC	List: Republican Left of Catalonia (ERC)	Àngel Colom	Catalan independence Left-wing nationalism Social democracy	8.0%	11	No	
IC–EV	List: Initiative for Catalonia (IC) – Unified Socialist Party of Catalonia (PSUC) – Party of the Communists of Catalonia (PCC); The Greens–Ecologist Confederation of Catalonia (EV–CEC)	Rafael Ribó	Eco-socialism; Green politics	7.7%	7	No	
PP	List: People's Party (PP)	Alejo Vidal-Quadras	Conservatism; Christian democracy	6.0%	7	No	

== Opinion polls ==
The tables below list opinion polling results in reverse chronological order, showing the most recent first and using the dates when the survey fieldwork was done, as opposed to the date of publication. Where the fieldwork dates are unknown, the date of publication is given instead. The highest percentage figure in each polling survey is displayed with its background shaded in the leading party's colour. If a tie ensues, this is applied to the figures with the highest percentages. The "Lead" column on the right shows the percentage-point difference between the parties with the highest percentages in a poll.

=== Voting intention estimates ===
The table below lists weighted voting intention estimates. Refusals are generally excluded from the party vote percentages, while question wording and the treatment of "don't know" responses and those not intending to vote may vary between polling organisations. When available, seat projections determined by the polling organisations are displayed below (or in place of) the percentages in a smaller font; 68 seats were required for an absolute majority in the Parliament of Catalonia.

Color key:

Exit poll

Polling firm/Commissioner	Fieldwork date	Sample size	Turnout	CiU	PSC	ERC	IC	PP	Lead
1995 regional election	19 Nov 1995	—N/a	63.6	40.9; 60	24.9; 34	9.5; 13	9.7; 11	13.1; 17	16.0
Vox Pública/Antena 3	19 Nov 1995	?	?	44.0; 64/67	22.0; 30/33	11.0; 13/15	9.5; 9/10	12.0; 14/16	22.0
Eco Consulting/CCRTV	19 Nov 1995	?	?	43.0; 64/68	22.0; 28/31	11.0; 14/16	9.9; 10/12	12.0; 14/16	21.0
Sigma Dos/El Mundo	12 Nov 1995	1,000	?	45.2; 65/68	23.8; 31/35	8.8; 11/12	7.4; 8/9	11.4; 15/16	21.4
Demoscopia/El País	12 Nov 1995	2,000	63	45.4; 66/70	23.2; 29/30	7.2; 10/11	11.6; 12/13	11.7; 14/16	22.2
Vox Pública/El Periódico	12 Nov 1995	1,200	?	46.5; 68/72	23.2; 31/35	8.3; 10/12	9.4; 11/12	8.4; 11/12	23.3
Imagen & Opinión/ABC	7–8 Nov 1995	1,260	?	44.7; 62/65	24.3; 33/34	9.2; 12/13	7.8; 11	10.4; 13/15	20.4
Opina/La Vanguardia	6–7 Nov 1995	2,000	?	46.0; 69/71	21.0; 28/30	10.0; 11/14	10.0; 9/13	11.0; 11/14	25.0
EMB Yankelovich/Avui	5 Nov 1995	1,223	?	46.7; 68/69	22.1; 30/31	9.3; 11/12	9.3; 11/12	12.6; 13/14	24.6
Vox Pública/El Periódico	25–26 Oct 1995	1,200	?	46.3; 67/70	21.7; 31/33	8.2; 11/12	10.3; 12	9.8; 12/13	24.6
Imagen & Opinión/ABC	22–24 Oct 1995	1,000	?	45.5; 65/69	24.4; 32/34	8.6; 10/12	8.7; 9/11	11.4; 15/16	21.1
Opina/La Vanguardia	16–17 Oct 1995	1,500	?	45.5; 67/69	22.3; 32/33	10.2; 12/13	8.4; 10	10.5; 12/13	23.2
Demoscopia/El País	9 Oct 1995	800	?	42.0; 60/64	23.0; 29/33	9.0; 10/11	12.0; 13/15	13.0; 15/17	19.0
CIS (Note: "Percepción de la realidad sociopolítica en Cataluña (II) (Estudio nº 2192. Septiembre-octubre 1995)". CIS (in Spanish). 18 October 1995. Archived from the original on 6 January 2015.)	22 Sep–4 Oct 1995	2,492	67.0	44.5; 65/67	24.0; 33/34	9.0; 11/12	9.5; 10/11	10.0; 11/13	20.5
Sigma Dos/El Mundo	20 Sep 1995	?	?	40.6; 60/63	27.7; 38/40	7.4; 9/11	7.6; 8/9	12.1; 16/17	12.9
Imagen & Opinión/ABC	14–20 Jul 1995	2,000	?	42.1; 59/62	23.0; 31/33	8.4; 10/11	8.0; 8/9	16.4; 22/24	19.1
1994 EP election	12 Jun 1994	—N/a	51.9	31.5 (48)	28.2 (41)	5.5 (7)	11.1 (13)	18.5 (26)	3.3
1993 general election	6 Jun 1993	—N/a	75.4	31.8 (49)	34.9 (48)	5.1 (6)	7.5 (8)	17.0 (24)	3.1
1992 regional election	15 Mar 1992	—N/a	54.9	46.2; 70	27.5; 40	8.0; 11	6.5; 7	6.0; 7	18.7

=== Voting preferences ===
The table below lists raw, unweighted voting preferences.

Polling firm/Commissioner	Fieldwork date	Sample size	CiU	PSC	ERC	IC	PP	Question	X mark	Lead
1995 regional election (Note: Does not include non-resident citizens.)	19 Nov 1995	—N/a	26.1	15.8	6.1	6.2	8.3	—N/a	36.0	10.3
CIS	28 Oct–6 Nov 1995	2,491	38.1	14.0	5.0	9.3	5.7	19.5	7.0	24.1
CIS	22 Sep–4 Oct 1995	2,492	29.9	17.9	5.4	7.2	5.7	20.9	9.1	12.0
CIS	20 Feb–6 Mar 1995	1,995	30.4	14.3	5.3	6.7	6.0	21.5	13.2	16.1
1994 EP election	12 Jun 1994	—N/a	16.4	14.6	2.9	5.8	9.6	—N/a	47.9	1.8
1993 general election	6 Jun 1993	—N/a	24.0	26.3	3.8	5.6	12.9	—N/a	24.3	2.3
CIS	7–21 Nov 1992	2,470	28.2	17.7	6.9	5.2	3.0	23.5	13.5	10.5
1992 regional election	15 Mar 1992	—N/a	25.2	15.0	4.3	3.5	3.2	—N/a	45.1	10.2

=== Victory preferences ===
The table below lists opinion polling on the victory preferences for each party in the event of a regional election taking place.

Polling firm/Commissioner	Fieldwork date	Sample size	CiU	PSC	ERC	IC	PP	Other/ None	Question	Lead
CIS	28 Oct–6 Nov 1995	2,491	49.5	13.7	5.2	9.0	5.2	1.7	15.7	35.8

=== Victory likelihood ===
The table below lists opinion polling on the perceived likelihood of victory for each party in the event of a regional election taking place.

Polling firm/Commissioner	Fieldwork date	Sample size	CiU	PSC	Other/ None	Question	Lead
CIS	28 Oct–6 Nov 1995	2,491	80.6	3.7	1.9	13.8	76.9

=== Preferred President ===
The table below lists opinion polling on leader preferences to become president of the Government of Catalonia.

Polling firm/Commissioner	Fieldwork date	Sample size						Other/ None/ Not care	Question	Lead
Polling firm/Commissioner	Fieldwork date	Sample size	Pujol CiU	Nadal PSC	Colom ERC	Ribó IC	Vidal-Quadras PP	Other/ None/ Not care	Question	Lead
CIS	28 Oct–6 Nov 1995	2,491	51.9	12.7	5.3	8.6	4.7	7.0	9.9	39.2
Opina/La Vanguardia	16–17 Oct 1995	1,500	42.2	8.9	4.3	3.8	3.2	–	37.6	33.3

=== Predicted President ===
The table below lists opinion polling on the perceived likelihood for each leader to become president.

Polling firm/Commissioner	Fieldwork date	Sample size						Other/ None/ Not care	Question	Lead
Polling firm/Commissioner	Fieldwork date	Sample size	Pujol CiU	Nadal PSC	Colom ERC	Ribó IC	Vidal-Quadras PP	Other/ None/ Not care	Question	Lead
Opina/La Vanguardia	16–17 Oct 1995	1,500	71.0	1.7	0.5	0.0	0.7	–	26.1	69.3

== Results ==
=== Overall ===
← Summary of the 19 November 1995 Parliament of Catalonia election results →
Parties and alliances	Popular vote			Seats	
Parties and alliances	Votes	%	±pp	Total	+/−
Convergence and Union (CiU)	1,320,071	40.95	−5.24	60	−10
Socialists' Party of Catalonia (PSC–PSOE)	802,252	24.89	−2.66	34	−6
People's Party (PP)	421,752	13.08	+7.11	17	+10
Initiative for Catalonia–The Greens (IC–EV)^{1}	313,092	9.71	+1.98	11	+4
Republican Left of Catalonia (ERC)	305,867	9.49	+1.53	13	+2
Ecologist Alternative of Catalonia (AEC)^{2}	14,651	0.45	−0.08	0	±0
Ecologist Party of Catalonia–VERDE (PEC–VERDE)	5,639	0.17	−0.12	0	±0
Revolutionary Workers' Party (POR)	3,886	0.12	+0.03	0	±0
Workers' Revolutionary Party (PRT)^{3}	2,221	0.07	−0.32	0	±0
Citizens of Catalonia–Platform of Independents of Spain (PICC–PIE)	1,580	0.05	New	0	±0
Civic Platform–New Socialist Party (PC–NPS)^{4}	869	0.03	−0.05	0	±0
Spanish Phalanx of the CNSO (FE–JONS)	327	0.01	New	0	±0
Party of Self-employed of Spain (PAE)	194	0.01	New	0	±0
Democratic Party of the People (PDEP)	134	0.00	New	0	±0
Blank ballots	31,417	0.97	−0.21		
Total	3,223,952			135	±0
Valid votes	3,223,952	99.72	+0.14		
Invalid votes	9,007	0.28	−0.14		
Votes cast / turnout	3,232,959	63.64	+8.77		
Abstentions	1,847,022	36.36	−8.77		
Registered voters	5,079,981				
Sources
Footnotes: ^{1} Initiative for Catalonia–The Greens results are compared to the combined totals of Initiative for Catalonia, Party of the Communists of Catalonia and Green Alternative–Ecologist Movement of Catalonia in the 1992 election.; ^{2} Ecologist Alternative of Catalonia results are compared to The Greens–Green Union totals in the 1992 election.; ^{3} Workers' Revolutionary Party results are compared to Workers' Socialist Party totals in the 1992 election.; ^{4} Civic Platform–New Socialist Party results are compared to Independent Socialists totals in the 1992 election.

Popular vote
CiU	40.95%
PSC–PSOE	24.89%
PP	13.08%
IC–EV	9.71%
ERC	9.49%
Others	0.92%
Blank ballots	0.97%

Seats
CiU	44.44%
PSC–PSOE	25.19%
PP	12.59%
ERC	9.63%
IC–EV	8.15%

=== Distribution by constituency ===
Constituency	CiU		PSC		PP		IC–EV		ERC	
Constituency	%	S	%	S	%	S	%	S	%	S
Barcelona	39.1	34	25.4	22	13.6	12	11.2	10	8.7	7
Girona	48.6	9	25.7	5	7.9	1	4.0	−	12.3	2
Lleida	49.7	8	19.5	3	12.2	2	4.2	−	12.8	2
Tarragona	43.2	9	23.2	4	14.3	2	6.4	1	11.1	2
Total	40.9	60	24.9	34	13.1	17	9.7	11	9.5	13

== Aftermath ==
=== Government formation ===
Investiture; Nomination of Jordi Pujol (CDC)
Ballot →	14 December 1995	16 December 1995
Required majority →	68 out of 135	Simple
Yes: • CiU (60)	60 / 135	60 / 135
No: • ERC (13) (on 14 Dec); • IC (11)	24 / 135	11 / 135
Abstentions: • PSC (33) (31 on 14 Dec); • PP (17); • ERC (13) (on 16 Dec)	48 / 135	63 / 135
Absentees: • PSC (1) (3 on 14 Dec)	3 / 135	1 / 135

== Bibliography ==
- Ley Orgánica 4/1979, de 18 de diciembre, de Estatuto de Autonomía de Cataluña (Organic Law 4/1979). Official State Gazette (in Spanish). 18 December 1979. BOE-A-1979-30178.
- Ley 3/1982, de 23 de marzo, del Parlamento, del Presidente y del Consejo Ejecutivo de la Generalidad (Law 3/1982). Official State Gazette (in Spanish). 23 March 1982. BOE-A-1982-10330.
- Ley 8/1985, de 24 de mayo, de modificación de la Ley 3/1982, de 23 de marzo, del Parlamento, del Presidente y del Consejo Ejecutivo de la Generalidad de Cataluña (Law 8/1985). Official State Gazette (in Spanish). 24 May 1985. BOE-A-1985-16307.
- Ley Orgánica 5/1985, de 19 de junio, del Régimen Electoral General (Organic Law 5/1985). Official State Gazette (in Spanish). 19 June 1985 [version as of 24 March 1995]. BOE-A-1985-11672.
- Decreto 253/1995, de 25 de septiembre, de disolución del Parlamento de Cataluña y convocatoria de elecciones (PDF) (Decree 253/1995). Official Journal of the Government of Catalonia (in Spanish). 25 September 1995.
