= 1992 Catalan regional election =

Election in the Spanish region of Catalonia

- 15 March 1992

All 135 seats in the Parliament of Catalonia 68 seats needed for a majority
- Opinion polls
- Registered: 4,839,071 ▲6.0%
- Turnout: 2,655,051 (54.9%) ▼4.5 pp
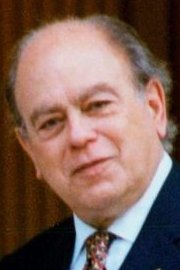

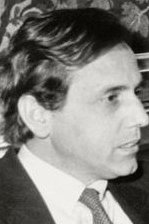

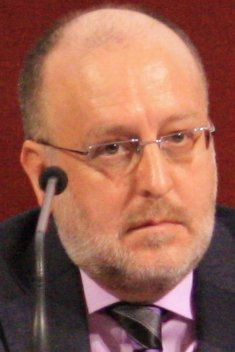

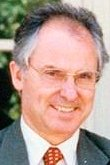

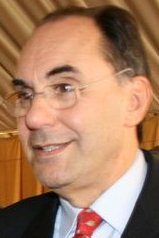
	First party	Second party	Third party
Leader	Jordi Pujol	Raimon Obiols	Àngel Colom
Party	CiU	PSC–PSOE	ERC
Leader since	17 November 1974	12 July 1983	19 November 1989
Leader's seat	Barcelona	Barcelona	Barcelona
Last election	69 seats, 45.7%	42 seats, 29.8%	6 seats, 4.1%
Seats won	70	40	11
Seat change	▲1	▼2	▲5
Popular vote	1,221,233	728,311	210,366
Percentage	46.2%	27.5%	8.0%
Swing	▲0.5 pp	▼2.3 pp	▲3.9 pp
	Fourth party	Fifth party
Leader	Rafael Ribó	Alejo Vidal-Quadras
Party	IC	PP
Leader since	23 February 1987	9 January 1991
Leader's seat	Barcelona	Barcelona
Last election	9 seats, 7.8%	6 seats, 5.3% (Note: Results for AP in the 1988 election.)
Seats won	7	7
Seat change	▼2	▲1
Popular vote	171,794	157,772
Percentage	6.5%	6.0%
Swing	▼1.3 pp	▲0.7 pp
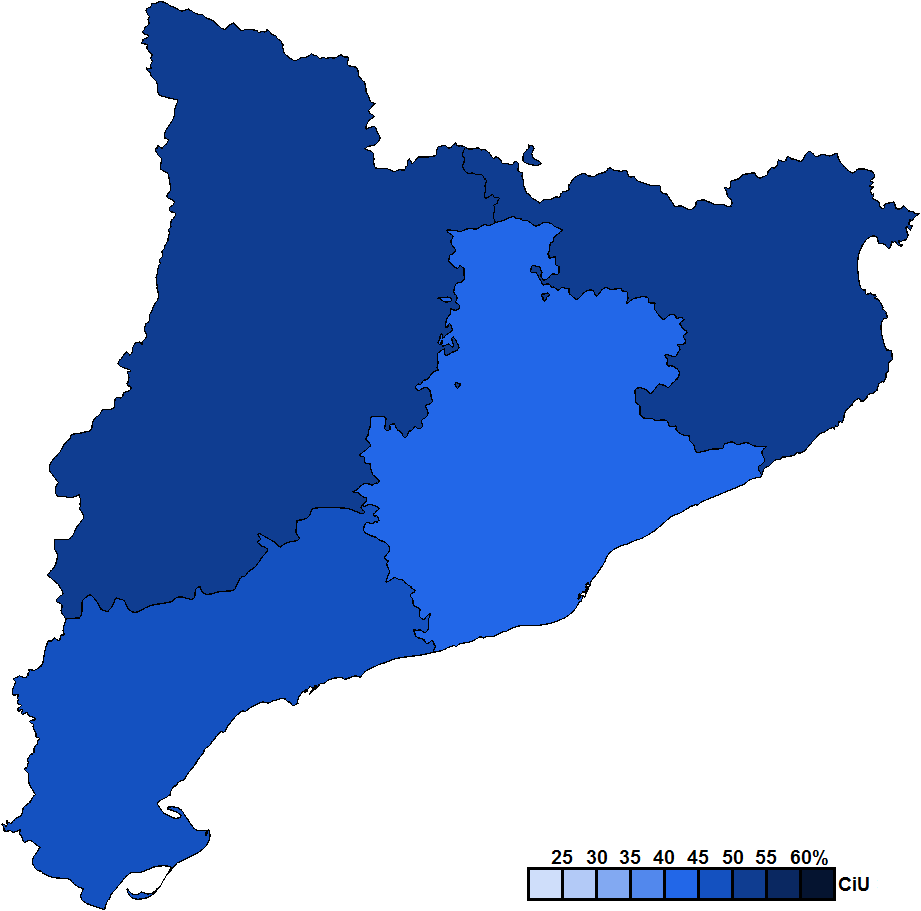
President before election
Jordi Pujol
CDC (CiU)
President after election
Jordi Pujol
CDC (CiU)

A regional election was held in Catalonia on 15 March 1992 to elect the 4th Parliament of the autonomous community. All 135 seats in the Parliament were up for election.

== Overview ==
Under the 1979 Statute of Autonomy, the Parliament of Catalonia was the unicameral legislature of the homonymous autonomous community, having legislative power in devolved matters, as well as the ability to grant or withdraw confidence from a regional president. The electoral and procedural rules were supplemented by national law provisions.

=== Date ===
The term of the Parliament of Catalonia expired four years after the date of its previous election, unless it was dissolved earlier. The election was required to be called no later than 15 days before the scheduled expiration date of parliament, with election day taking place within 60 days from the call. The previous election was held on 29 May 1988, which meant that the chamber's term would have expired on 29 May 1992. The election was required to be called no later than 14 May 1992, setting the latest possible date for election day on 13 July 1992.

The regional president had the prerogative to dissolve the Parliament of Catalonia at any given time and call a snap election, provided that no motion of no confidence was in process and that dissolution did not occur before one year after a previous one under this procedure. In the event of an investiture process failing to elect a regional president within a two-month period from the first ballot, the Parliament was to be automatically dissolved and a fresh election called.

The Parliament of Catalonia was officially dissolved on 21 January 1992 with the publication of the corresponding decree in the Official Journal of the Government of Catalonia (DOGC), setting election day for 15 March.

=== Electoral system ===
Voting for the Parliament was based on universal suffrage, comprising all Spanish nationals over 18 years of age, registered in Catalonia and with full political rights, provided that they had not been deprived of the right to vote by a final sentence, nor were legally incapacitated.

The Parliament of Catalonia had a minimum of 100 and a maximum of 150 seats, with electoral provisions fixing its size at 135. All were elected in four multi-member constituencies—corresponding to the provinces of Barcelona, Girona, Lleida and Tarragona, each of which was assigned a fixed number of seats—using the D'Hondt method and closed-list proportional voting, with a three percent-threshold of valid votes (including blank ballots) in each constituency. The use of this electoral method resulted in a higher effective threshold depending on district magnitude and vote distribution.

As a result of the aforementioned allocation, each Parliament constituency was entitled the following seats:

Seats	Constituencies (Note: The provinces of Gerona and Lérida were officially renamed as Girona and Lleida on 1 March 1992.)
85	Barcelona
18	Tarragona
17	Girona
15	Lleida

The law did not provide for by-elections to fill vacant seats; instead, any vacancies arising after the proclamation of candidates and during the legislative term were filled by the next candidates on the party lists or, when required, by designated substitutes.

== Parties and candidates ==
The electoral law allowed for parties and federations registered in the interior ministry, alliances and groupings of electors to present lists of candidates. Parties and federations intending to form an alliance were required to inform the relevant electoral commission within 10 days of the election call, whereas groupings of electors needed to secure the signature of at least one percent of the electorate in the constituencies for which they sought election, disallowing electors from signing for more than one list.

Below is a list of the main parties and alliances which contested the election:

Candidacy	Parties and alliances	Leading candidate	Ideology	Previous result		Gov.	Ref.
Candidacy	Parties and alliances	Leading candidate	Ideology	Vote %	Seats	Gov.	Ref.
CiU	List: Democratic Convergence of Catalonia (CDC); Democratic Union of Catalonia (UDC)	Jordi Pujol	Catalan nationalism Centrism	45.7%	69	Yes	
PSC–PSOE	List: Socialists' Party of Catalonia (PSC–PSOE)	Raimon Obiols	Social democracy	29.8%	42	No	
IC	List: Unified Socialist Party of Catalonia (PSUC); Agreement of Left Nationalists (ENE)	Rafael Ribó	Eco-socialism; Green politics	7.8%	9	No	
PP	List: People's Party (PP)	Alejo Vidal-Quadras	Conservatism; Christian democracy	5.3%	6	No	
ERC	List: Republican Left of Catalonia (ERC)	Àngel Colom	Catalan independence Left-wing nationalism Social democracy	4.1%	6	No	
CDS	List: Democratic and Social Centre (CDS)	Teresa Sandoval	Centrism; Liberalism	3.8%	3	No	

== Opinion polls ==
The tables below list opinion polling results in reverse chronological order, showing the most recent first and using the dates when the survey fieldwork was done, as opposed to the date of publication. Where the fieldwork dates are unknown, the date of publication is given instead. The highest percentage figure in each polling survey is displayed with its background shaded in the leading party's colour. If a tie ensues, this is applied to the figures with the highest percentages. The "Lead" column on the right shows the percentage-point difference between the parties with the highest percentages in a poll.

=== Voting intention estimates ===
The table below lists weighted voting intention estimates. Refusals are generally excluded from the party vote percentages, while question wording and the treatment of "don't know" responses and those not intending to vote may vary between polling organisations. When available, seat projections determined by the polling organisations are displayed below (or in place of) the percentages in a smaller font; 68 seats were required for an absolute majority in the Parliament of Catalonia.

Polling firm/Commissioner	Fieldwork date	Sample size	Turnout	CiU	PSC	IC	AP	ERC	CDS	PP	Lead
1992 regional election	15 Mar 1992	—N/a	54.9	46.2; 70	27.5; 40	6.5; 7	(Note: Within PP.)	8.0; 11	0.9; 0	6.0; 7	18.7
Sigma Dos/Diari de Barcelona	8 Mar 1992	2,400	?	46.1; 70	29.0; 42	8.0; 9		5.2; 6	1.6; 0	6.4; 8	17.1
RGR/Avui	8 Mar 1992	1,000	?	47.5; 71/73	27.6; 39/41	8.3; 9/10		5.3; 7	1.8; 0	5.1; 5/6	19.9
Gabise/El Observador	8 Mar 1992	800	?	46.6; 68/71	30.8; 41/43	6.7; 6/7		5.6; 7/8	2.0; 0	6.1; 7	15.8
Marketing Comunicación/ERC	8 Mar 1992	4,780	55	? 76/78	? 36/38	? 5		? 12	–	? 4/5	?
OTR–IS/El Periódico	3–5 Mar 1992	2,000	57	46.4; 69/72	29.2; 40/43	7.7; 8/9		5.6; 7	–	6.3; 7	17.2
Opina/La Vanguardia	2–4 Mar 1992	2,004	?	47.9; 69/72	28.2; 40/42	7.0; 8		6.5; 8/9	1.5; 0	5.6; 5/7	19.7
Demoscopia/El País	29 Feb–4 Mar 1992	1,600	58	46.5; 71/72	27.6; 39/40	7.1; 7/8		6.2; 8	1.1; 0	6.3; 8	18.9
Opina/La Vanguardia	17–19 Feb 1992	2,000	60–65	47.5; 69/72	28.5; 41/42	8.5; 9/10		5.0; 7	1.0; 0	5.0; 6/7	19.0
Demoscopia/El País	8–14 Feb 1992	1,600	58	46.4; 68/71	30.1; 40/44	6.9; 6/9		6.0; 7/8	1.6; 0	6.2; 8	16.3
OTR–IS/El Periódico	8–11 Feb 1992	2,000	?	46.6; 70/72	27.9; 39/42	8.2; 8/9		5.6; 7	1.8; 0	6.5; 7/8	18.7
Producciones 5/Avui	19 Jan 1992	2,900	?	46.8; 67/70	28.8; 42/43	7.5; 8/10		5.1; 6	2.6; 0/3	6.0; 7	18.0
Central de Campo/PSC	3 Jan 1992	?	?	40.0	32.0	–		–	–	–	8.0
1989 general election	29 Oct 1989	—N/a	67.6	32.7 (54)	35.6 (53)	7.3 (8)		2.7 (0)	4.3 (4)	10.6 (16)	2.9
1989 EP election	15 Jun 1989	—N/a	51.5	27.5 (48)	36.4 (60)	5.5 (7)		3.3 (4)	3.7 (3)	8.6 (13)	8.9
1988 regional election	29 May 1988	—N/a	59.4	45.7; 69	29.8; 42	7.8; 9	5.3; 6	4.1; 6	3.8; 3	–	15.9

=== Voting preferences ===
The table below lists raw, unweighted voting preferences.

Polling firm/Commissioner	Fieldwork date	Sample size	CiU	PSC	IC	AP	ERC	CDS	PP	Question	X mark	Lead
1992 regional election (Note: Does not include non-resident citizens.)	15 Mar 1992	—N/a	25.2	15.0	3.5		4.3	0.5	3.2	—N/a	45.1	10.2
1989 general election	29 Oct 1989	—N/a	22.0	24.0	4.9		1.8	2.9	7.2	—N/a	32.3	2.0
1989 EP election	15 Jun 1989	—N/a	14.1	18.6	2.8		1.7	1.9	4.4	—N/a	48.4	4.5
1988 regional election	29 May 1988	—N/a	26.5	17.1	4.4	3.1	2.4	2.2	–	—N/a	40.7	9.4

=== Victory preferences ===
The table below lists opinion polling on the victory preferences for each party in the event of a regional election taking place.

Polling firm/Commissioner	Fieldwork date	Sample size	CiU	PSC	IC	ERC	CDS	PP	Other/ None	Question	Lead
Demoscopia/El País	29 Feb–4 Mar 1992	1,600	43.0	17.0	3.0	5.0	1.0	3.0	28.0		26.0
Opina/La Vanguardia	17–19 Feb 1992	2,000	42.9	22.3	6.0	2.7	0.8	2.9	1.2	13.5	20.6
Demoscopia/El País	8–14 Feb 1992	1,600	38.0	23.0	4.0	6.0	1.0	3.0	25.0		15.0
CIS	11–25 Jan 1992	2,484	37.7	21.5	3.2	4.8	0.3	2.8	1.2	28.5	16.2
CIS	1 Oct 1991	2,496	32.6	25.2	5.3	4.8	0.5	2.0	2.0	27.7	7.4

=== Victory likelihood ===
The table below lists opinion polling on the perceived likelihood of victory for each party in the event of a regional election taking place.

Polling firm/Commissioner	Fieldwork date	Sample size	CiU	PSC	IC	ERC	CDS	PP	Other/ None	Question	Lead
CIS	28 Feb–9 Mar 1992	2,500	71.6	5.6	0.2	0.4	0.0	0.4	0.0	21.8	66.0
Demoscopia/El País	29 Feb–4 Mar 1992	1,600	74.0	6.0	0.0	0.0	0.0	1.0	19.0		68.0
Opina/La Vanguardia	17–19 Feb 1992	2,000	72.6	9.6	0.1	0.1	0.1	0.6	0.1	16.2	63.0
Demoscopia/El País	8–14 Feb 1992	1,600	63.0	14.0	0.0	1.0	1.0	2.0	19.0		49.0
CIS	27 Jan–1 Feb 1992	2,498	66.1	12.7	0.2	0.6	0.4	0.7	0.3	19.1	53.4
CIS	11–25 Jan 1992	2,484	63.7	8.2	0.1	0.4	–	0.5	0.1	27.0	55.5
CIS	1 Oct 1991	2,496	58.4	9.0	0.5	0.3	–	0.2	0.1	31.4	49.4

=== Preferred President ===
The table below lists opinion polling on leader preferences to become president of the Government of Catalonia.

Polling firm/Commissioner	Fieldwork date	Sample size							Other/ None/ Not care	Question	Lead
Polling firm/Commissioner	Fieldwork date	Sample size	Pujol CiU	Obiols PSC	Ribó IC	Colom ERC	Sandoval CDS	Vidal-Quadras PP	Other/ None/ Not care	Question	Lead
Demoscopia/El País	29 Feb–4 Mar 1992	1,600	48.0	15.0	4.0	4.0	0.0	2.0	27.0		33.0
Demoscopia/El País	8–14 Feb 1992	1,600	45.0	16.0	3.0	3.0	0.0	1.0	32.0		29.0

== Results ==
=== Overall ===
← Summary of the 15 March 1992 Parliament of Catalonia election results →
Parties and alliances	Popular vote			Seats	
Parties and alliances	Votes	%	±pp	Total	+/−
Convergence and Union (CiU)	1,221,233	46.19	+0.47	70	+1
Socialists' Party of Catalonia (PSC–PSOE)	728,311	27.55	−2.23	40	−2
Republican Left of Catalonia (ERC)	210,366	7.96	+3.82	11	+5
Initiative for Catalonia (IC)	171,794	6.50	−1.26	7	−2
People's Party (PP)^{1}	157,772	5.97	+0.66	7	+1
Democratic and Social Centre (CDS)	24,033	0.91	−2.92	0	−3
Party of the Communists of Catalonia (PCC)	22,181	0.84	New	0	±0
The Greens–Green Union (EV–UV)	14,041	0.53	New	0	±0
Ruiz-Mateos Group (ARM)	13,067	0.49	New	0	±0
Green Alternative–Ecologist Movement of Catalonia (AV–MEC)	10,323	0.39	−0.22	0	±0
Workers' Socialist Party (PST)	10,270	0.39	+0.18	0	±0
The Ecologists (LVE)	9,879	0.37	+0.05	0	±0
Ecologist Party of Catalonia–VERDE (PEC–VERDE)	7,786	0.29	+0.07	0	±0
Free Catalonia (CLL)	5,241	0.20	New	0	±0
Revolutionary Workers' Party of Spain (PORE)	2,258	0.09	−0.01	0	±0
Independent Socialists (SI)^{2}	2,080	0.08	+0.04	0	±0
Humanist Party (PH)	1,752	0.07	−0.01	0	±0
Lleida Republican Youth (JRLL)	431	0.02	New	0	±0
Blank ballots	31,092	1.18	+0.55		
Total	2,643,910			135	±0
Valid votes	2,643,910	99.58	+0.09		
Invalid votes	11,141	0.42	−0.09		
Votes cast / turnout	2,655,051	54.87	−4.50		
Abstentions	2,184,020	45.13	+4.50		
Registered voters	4,839,071				
Sources
Footnotes: ^{1} People's Party results are compared to People's Alliance totals in the 1988 election.; ^{2} Independent Socialists results are compared to Alliance for the Republic totals in the 1988 election.

Popular vote
CiU	46.19%
PSC–PSOE	27.55%
ERC	7.96%
IC	6.50%
PP	5.97%
Others	4.67%
Blank ballots	1.18%

Seats
CiU	51.85%
PSC–PSOE	29.63%
ERC	8.15%
IC	5.19%
PP	5.19%

=== Distribution by constituency ===
Constituency	CiU		PSC		ERC		IC		PP	
Constituency	%	S	%	S	%	S	%	S	%	S
Barcelona	44.6	41	28.9	27	7.2	6	7.4	6	5.9	5
Girona	54.3	11	21.8	4	11.6	2	3.4	−	4.0	−
Lleida	53.6	9	21.8	4	9.8	1	2.9	−	6.9	1
Tarragona	45.8	9	26.5	5	9.2	2	4.7	1	7.7	1
Total	46.2	70	27.5	40	8.0	11	6.5	7	6.0	7

== Aftermath ==
=== Government formation ===
Investiture; Nomination of Jordi Pujol (CDC)
Ballot →	9 April 1992
Required majority →	68 out of 135
Yes: • CiU (70)	70 / 135
No: • PSC (40); • ERC (11); • IC (7)	58 / 135
Abstentions: • PP (7)	7 / 135
Absentees	0 / 135

== Bibliography ==
- Ley Orgánica 4/1979, de 18 de diciembre, de Estatuto de Autonomía de Cataluña (Organic Law 4/1979). Official State Gazette (in Spanish). 18 December 1979. BOE-A-1979-30178.
- Ley 3/1982, de 23 de marzo, del Parlamento, del Presidente y del Consejo Ejecutivo de la Generalidad (Law 3/1982). Official State Gazette (in Spanish). 23 March 1982. BOE-A-1982-10330.
- Ley 8/1985, de 24 de mayo, de modificación de la Ley 3/1982, de 23 de marzo, del Parlamento, del Presidente y del Consejo Ejecutivo de la Generalidad de Cataluña (Law 8/1985). Official State Gazette (in Spanish). 24 May 1985. BOE-A-1985-16307.
- Ley Orgánica 5/1985, de 19 de junio, del Régimen Electoral General (Organic Law 5/1985). Official State Gazette (in Spanish). 19 June 1985 [version as of 14 March 1991]. BOE-A-1985-11672.
- Decreto 1/1992, de 20 de enero, de disolución del Parlamento de Catalunya y convocatoria de elecciones (PDF) (Decree 1/1992). Official Journal of the Government of Catalonia (in Spanish). 20 January 1992.
- Ley 2/1992, de 28 de febrero, por la que pasan a denominarse oficialmente Girona y Lleida las provincias de Gerona y Lérida (Law 2/1992). Official State Gazette (in Spanish). 28 February 1992. BOE-A-1992-4904.
