= 1992 in Catalonia =

- Decades: 1970s; 1980s; 1990s; 2000s; 2010s
- See also: Other events of 1992; Timeline of Catalan history

Events from 1992 in Catalonia.

== Incumbents ==
- President of the Generalitat of Catalonia – Jordi Pujol

== Events ==
- 15 March – Catalan parliamentary election. CiU win 70 seats, and Jordi Pujol is reelected President of the Generalitat.
- 25 July – The 1992 Summer Olympics open in Barcelona.
