= Celestino Sánchez Ramos =

Spanish politician (1950–2025)

- Sanchez at a protest in 2012

Member of the Parliament of Catalonia for Barcelona
- In office 16 June 1988 – 21 January 1992
- In office 10 April 1980 – 20 March 1984

Personal details
- Born: Celestino Andrés Sánchez Ramos; 24 July 1950; Málaga, Spain
- Died: 12 July 2025 (aged 74); Sabadell, Spain
- Political party: PSUC (1967–1981); PCC (after 1982)
- Education: Polytechnic University of Catalonia
- Occupation: Trade unionist

Celstino Andrés Sánchez Ramos (Spanish: [θeleˈstino anˈdɾes ˈsantʃeθ ˈramos]; 24 July 1950 – 12 July 2025) was a Spanish politician. A member of the Unified Socialist Party of Catalonia and the Party of the Communists of Catalonia, he served in the Parliament of Catalonia from 1980 to 1984 and again from 1988 to 1992. He was involved in the 15-M anti-austerity movement.

Sánchez died in Sabadell on 12 July 2025, at the age of 74.
