= Suicide of Alan =

2015 suicide

- Date: c. December 24, 2015; 10 years ago
- Location: Rubí, Spain
- Type: Suicide by acute alcohol poisoning and drug overdose
- Deaths: 1

On December 24, 2015, Alan, a 17-year-old transgender man who resided in Rubí, Spain, committed suicide. He was one of the first minors in Spain to successfully change his name on government documents to align with his gender identity.

== Context ==
In 2015, Law 11/2014 was passed in Catalonia to protect the rights of lesbian, gay, bisexual, transgender, and queer (LGBTQ) people. The law includes provisions that allow for criminal charges for violence based on sexual orientation or gender identity in education.

Two of the articles in Law 11/2014 are the following:

- Respect for diversity regarding sexual orientation, gender identity, or gender expression, and for the principles of this law, must be effective throughout the education system, in training centers and institutions, in adult education, in parenting training, in school sports and activities, and in children's and youth leisure activities.
- Awareness-raising and prevention of violence based on sexual orientation, gender identity, or gender expression must be ensured, and mechanisms must be provided for schools to detect situations of discrimination or exclusion against any individual for these reasons. In this regard, the effective development of coexistence plans must be promoted, with a special emphasis on measures to prevent and address the harassment that LGBTQ individuals may face in schools.

As of October 2015, the law had not yet been implemented.

== Alan ==
Alan was born in October 1998. His mother reported following his death that he had often been bullied at school, being exacerbated after the death of his cousin. On December 24, 2013, exactly two years before his death, he was admitted to a hospital for severe depression, spending most of 2014 in between there and a day centre.

== Suicide ==
Alan had been at a day centre and generally felt safe there. He had been scheduled for an appointment on December 24. Early on December 25, he spoke with his psychologist, who relayed the situation to his parents. That afternoon, he took pills that were not his and drank alcohol, causing him to enter cardiac arrest.

The day following his death, his mother reported to the Chrysallis Association of Families of Transgender Minors, the support group they joined a month beforehand, his death.

== Reactions and investigation ==
Alan's suicide was reported in multiple Spanish news outlets. Following his death, protests took place across Spain, though namely in Catalonia, against transphobia. A common manifesto throughout the protests was "It's not suicide, it's a social murder!"

In Rubí, where he resided, a rally took place in honor of Alan and had over 1,000 attendees. The Platform of People Affected by Bullying, "Alanmón", was named after Alan in Rubí following the rally. Another demonstration took place in Barcelona following his death demanding the full implementation of Law 11/2014.

Local LGBTQ+ organizations in Catalonia also demanded the implementation of Law 11/2014 and some form of response for Alan's death. Rafael Ribó, a Catalan ombudsman, ordered an investigation into the incident.
