= Convergence and Union =

Convergence and Union Convergència i Unió
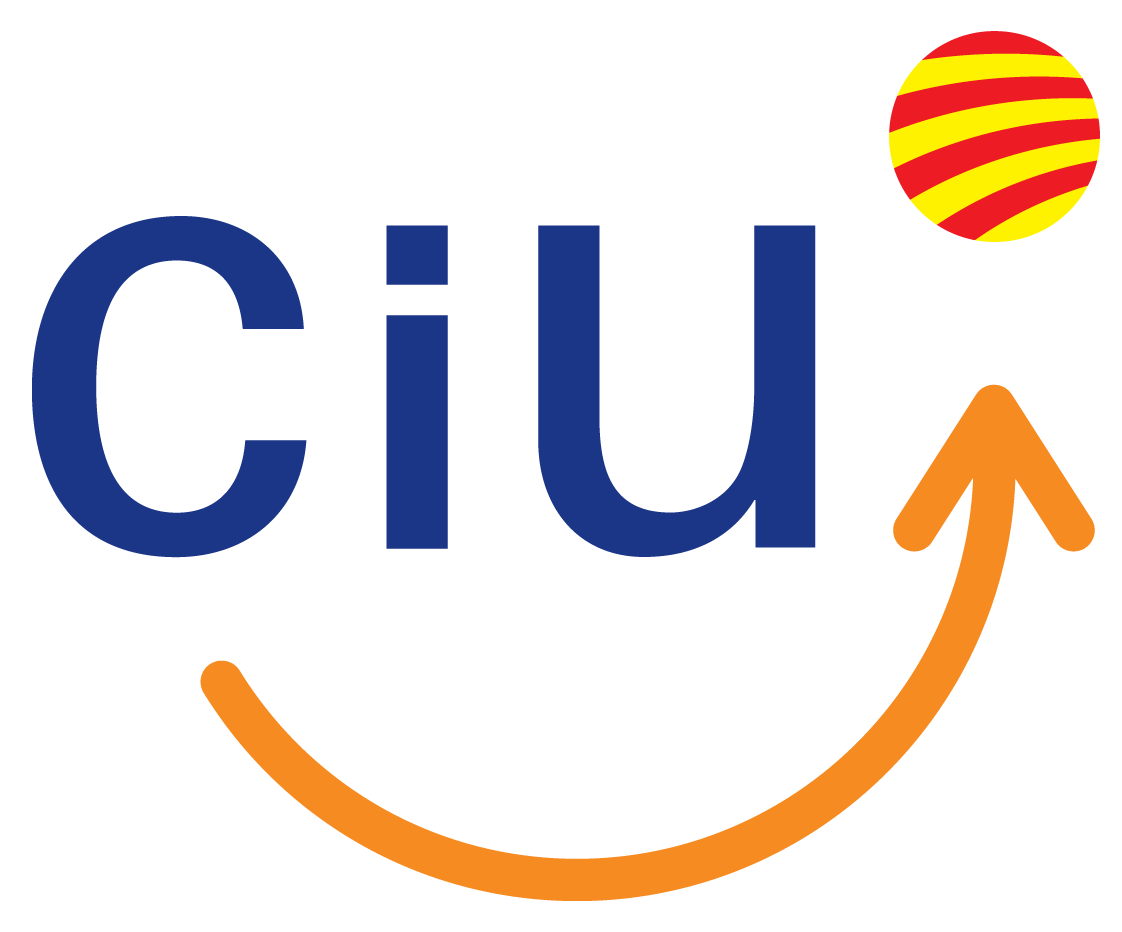
- Abbreviation: CiU
- President: Artur Mas
- General Secretary: Ramon Espadaler
- Founded: 19 September 1978 (coalition); 2 December 2001 (federation)
- Dissolved: 18 June 2015
- Preceded by: Democratic Pact for Catalonia; Democracy and Catalonia
- Succeeded by: Junts pel Sí
- Headquarters: C/ Còrsega, 331-333; 08037, Barcelona
- Ideology: Catalan nationalism; Factions: Populism; Christian democracy; Liberalism; Conservatism; Catalan independentism; Social democracy
- Political position: Centre to centre-right
- National affiliation: Galeusca (2004–2009); CEU (2009–2014); CEU (2014–2015)
- European affiliation: ALDE Party (CDC); EPP (UDC)
- European Parliament group: ALDE Group (CDC); EPP Group (UDC)
- International affiliation: Liberal International (CDC); Centrist Democrat International (UDC)
- Colours: Dark blue (customary); Orange (official)

Website
- www.ciu.cat

Convergence and Union (Catalan: Convergència i Unió [kumbəɾˈʒɛnsi.əj uniˈo], CiU) was a Catalan nationalist electoral alliance in Catalonia, Spain. It was a federation of two constituent parties, the larger Democratic Convergence of Catalonia (CDC) and its smaller counterpart, the Democratic Union of Catalonia (UDC). It was dissolved on 18 June 2015.

CiU was a Catalan nationalist coalition. During its lifespan, it was usually seen as a moderate nationalist party in Spain, although a significant part of its membership had shifted to open Catalan independentism during the party's last years, and by 2014 demonstrated its intention to hold a referendum on Catalan independence. There is some debate as to whether the coalition was conservative or centrist. Liberal tendencies dominate the larger CDC, while the smaller UDC is a Christian democratic party. As for its position in the nationalist debate, it was deliberately ambiguous so as to appeal to the broadest spectrum possible, from voters who seek full independence from Spain to those who are generally satisfied with the present self-government status. In general, the CDC tends to be more supportive of Catalan sovereignty, while the UDC is considered closer to traditional Catalan autonomism and more nuanced nationalism. The electoral manifesto for the elections in 2012 states that "we want to build a wide social majority so that Catalonia can have its own State in the European frame, because Catalonia has the will to become a normal country among world's countries and nations".

In the 2012 regional elections, CiU won 30.71% of the vote. It lost 12 seats in the Catalan Parliament, bringing them to a total of 50 deputies. While they have more than twice as many deputies as any other party, they were left 18 seats short of a majority in the 135-member body. After the election, they entered into coalition with the Republican Left of Catalonia (ERC), which has a completely different political orientation but also supports Catalan independence. El Periódico de Catalunya reported in August 2013 that the coalition may break apart due to fractions within the union about Catalan independence, with UDC opposing secessionism.

On 18 June 2015 CDC spokespersons declared the CiU federation "finished", albeit amenable to an "amicable" separation. This occurred after an ultimatum had been issued by President Mas to UDC, due to their diverging positions on the Catalan independence process.

== Policies and ideology ==
CiU used to defend the notion of Catalonia as a nation within Spain, striving for the highest possible level of autonomy for Catalonia. However, it has recently become a pro-secession party.

CiU is generally considered a Catalan nationalist party; this is also the term it uses to describe itself. Both the Spanish and Catalan media perceive it as a moderate nationalist force. However, its liberal fraction (CDC) has a relatively strong current which advocates Catalan independence from Spain and which has grown stronger after 2006. Many high ranking exponents of the Democratic Convergence define CiU as an independentist political force. The party's president Artur Mas has stated he would vote in favour of Catalan independence in a theoretical referendum of independence, but he added this would not be his official policy if elected as President of Catalonia.

On the other hand, the Christian democratic part of the coalition, the Democratic Union of Catalonia, is less favourable to the idea of an independent Catalonia. Nevertheless, several prominent members of the Democratic Union have also supported independence, especially since the late 2000s. However, the supporters of independence within the Democratic Union are a minority with much less influence than their counterparts in the Democratic Convergence.

== Terms of office ==
At the Catalan level, CiU ruled the autonomous Catalan government during the 1980s until 2003 for 23 consecutive years led by Jordi Pujol (CDC). Pujol was succeeded in the party leadership by Artur Mas (CDC), while Unió's leader (second at the CiU level) is Josep Antoni Duran i Lleida. It then served in opposition to a tripartite centre-left government of the Socialists' Party of Catalonia (PSC), the Republican Left of Catalonia (ERC) and the Initiative for Catalonia Greens (ICV) until November 2010, when it regained power (but lacking an overall majority, still needing a coalition partner).

== 2008 General Elections ==
The party won 10 seats in the Congress of Deputies at the March 2008 elections.

CiU supported changes to the Catalan Statute of Autonomy to further increase Catalonia's autonomy. It is currently the most voted party at regional elections in Catalonia, but in 2003 lost its absolute majority and is the main opposition party at the Catalan autonomous level, having been replaced in the government by a centre-left tripartite coalition formed in 2003 and re-formed after the 2006 Catalan regional elections, which were called due to divisions in the coalition.

== 2010 Catalan elections ==
On Sunday 28 November 2010 (28-N), CiU regained control of the regional parliament after seven years in opposition, winning about 38% of the popular vote, earning 62 seats out of the total 135. Its platform was broadly centrist, and somewhat ambiguous about independence from Spain.

In the 2010 elections, the turnout was just above 60%, and the Socialists' Party of Catalonia were considered the biggest losers, holding only 28 seats of their former 37. All other parties lost support, as well, except the liberal-conservative People's Party of Catalonia, which increased its support by 1.5%, and the liberal Citizens' Party which maintained their position.

== 2012 Catalan elections ==
On Sunday 25 November 2012, CiU maintained its control of the regional parliament by winning approximately 30 per cent of the popular vote and earning 50 seats of the total 135. This represents a drop in voter support since the 2010 election, with voter turn-out for the 2012 election at approximately 70%, or the highest since 1998. It is also the lowest percentage of the vote the coalition has scored since its formation in 1988.

== Electoral performance ==
=== Parliament of Catalonia ===
Parliament of Catalonia
Election	Leading candidate	Votes	%	Seats	Gov.
1980	Jordi Pujol	752,943	27.8 (#1)	43 / 135	Yes
1984	Jordi Pujol	1,346,729	46.8 (#1)	72 / 135	Yes
1988	Jordi Pujol	1,232,514	45.7 (#1)	69 / 135	Yes
1992	Jordi Pujol	1,221,233	46.2 (#1)	70 / 135	Yes
1995	Jordi Pujol	1,320,071	40.9 (#1)	60 / 135	Yes
1999	Jordi Pujol	1,178,420	37.7 (#2)	56 / 135	Yes
2003	Artur Mas	1,024,425	30.9 (#2)	46 / 135	No
2006	Artur Mas	935,756	31.5 (#1)	48 / 135	No
2010	Artur Mas	1,202,830	38.4 (#1)	62 / 135	Yes
2012	Artur Mas	1,116,259	30.7 (#1)	50 / 135	Yes

=== Cortes Generales ===
Cortes Generales
Election	Leading candidate	Congress			Senate			Gov.
Election	Leading candidate	Votes	%	Seats	Votes	%	Seats	Gov.
1979	Jordi Pujol	483,353	2.7 (#5)	8 / 350	1,387,176	2.8 (#7)	1 / 208	No
1982	Miquel Roca	772,726	3.7 (#5)	12 / 350	Within CaS		5 / 208	No
1986	Miquel Roca	1,014,258	5.0 (#4)	18 / 350	2,934,479	5.3 (#4)	8 / 208	No
1989	Miquel Roca	1,032,243	5.0 (#5)	18 / 350	2,937,029	5.3 (#5)	10 / 208	No
1993	Miquel Roca	1,165,783	4.9 (#4)	17 / 350	3,458,419	5.3 (#4)	10 / 208	(Note: Confidence and supply.)
1996	Joaquim Molins	1,151,633	4.6 (#4)	16 / 350	3,338,737	4.9 (#4)	8 / 208	Orange tick
2000	Xavier Trias	970,421	4.2 (#4)	15 / 350	2,809,367	4.5 (#5)	8 / 208	No
2004	Josep Antoni Duran i Lleida	835,471	3.2 (#4)	10 / 350	2,670,375	3.8 (#5)	4 / 208	No
2008	Josep Antoni Duran i Lleida	779,425	3.0 (#4)	10 / 350	2,437,338	3.5 (#4)	4 / 208	No
2011	Josep Antoni Duran i Lleida	1,015,691	4.2 (#5)	16 / 350	2,590,266	4.1 (#5)	9 / 208	No

=== European Parliament ===
European Parliament
Election	Leading candidate	Votes	%	Seats	EP Group
1987	Carles Gasòliba	853,603	4.4 (#5)	3 / 60	LDR/ELDR; EPP
1989	Carles Gasòliba	666,602	4.2 (#5)	2 / 60	LDR/ELDR; EPP
1994	Carles Gasòliba	865,913	4.7 (#4)	3 / 64	LDR/ELDR; EPP
1999	Pere Esteve	937,687	4.4 (#4)	3 / 64	LDR/ELDR; EPP
2004	Ignasi Guardans	Within Galeusca		1 / 54	ALDE
2009	Ramon Tremosa	Within CEU (2009)		2 / 54	ALDE; EPP
2014	Ramon Tremosa	Within CEU (2014)		2 / 54	ALDE; EPP

== See also ==
- List of political parties in Spain
- Autonomous Community

== Bibliography ==
- Dowling, Andrew (2005). "Convergència i Unió, Catalonia and the new Catalanism". The Politics of Contemporary Spain. Routledge. pp. 106–120. ISBN 978-0-415-35677-0.
