= Santi Rodríguez (politician) =

Spanish politician (born 1964)

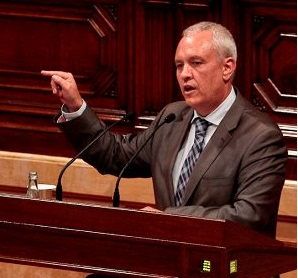

Member of the Congress of Deputies
- Incumbent
- Assumed office 17 August 2023
- Constituency: Barcelona

Personal details
- Born: 18 April 1964 (age 61)
- Party: People's Party

Santiago Rodríguez Serra (born 18 April 1964) is a Spanish politician serving as a member of the Congress of Deputies since 2023. From 2003 to 2020, he was a member of the Parliament of Catalonia.
