= 1988 Catalan regional election =

Election in the Spanish region of Catalonia

- 29 May 1988

All 135 seats in the Parliament of Catalonia 68 seats needed for a majority
- Opinion polls
- Registered: 4,564,389 ▲1.6%
- Turnout: 2,709,685 (59.4%) ▼5.0 pp
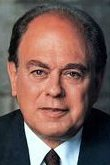

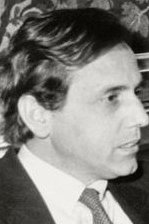

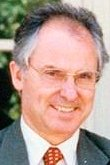

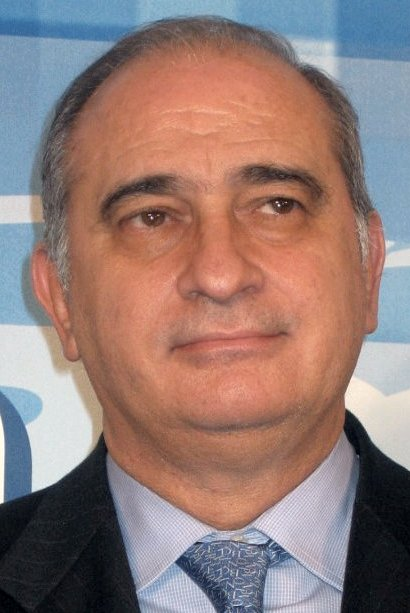

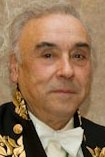

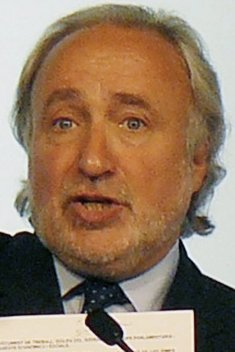
	First party	Second party	Third party
Leader	Jordi Pujol	Raimon Obiols	Rafael Ribó
Party	CiU	PSC–PSOE	IC
Leader since	17 November 1974	12 July 1983	23 February 1987
Leader's seat	Barcelona	Barcelona	Barcelona
Last election	72 seats, 46.8%	41 seats, 30.1%	6 seats, 9.2% (Note: Results for PSUC (5.6%, 6 seats), PCC (2.4%, 0 seats) and EEC (1.2%, 0 seats) in the 1984 election.)
Seats won	69	42	9
Seat change	▼3	▲1	▲3
Popular vote	1,232,514	802,828	209,211
Percentage	45.7%	29.8%	7.8%
Swing	▼1.1 pp	▼0.3 pp	▼1.4 pp
	Fourth party	Fifth party	Sixth party
Leader	Jorge Fernández Díaz	Joan Hortalà	Antoni Fernández Teixidó
Party	AP	ERC	CDS
Leader since	1985	1987	1988
Leader's seat	Barcelona	Barcelona	Barcelona
Last election	11 seats, 7.7% (Note: Results for AP–PDP–UL in the 1984 election.)	5 seats, 4.4%	Did not contest
Seats won	6	6	3
Seat change	▼5	▲1	▲3
Popular vote	143,241	111,647	103,351
Percentage	5.3%	4.1%	3.8%
Swing	▼2.4 pp	▼0.3 pp	New party
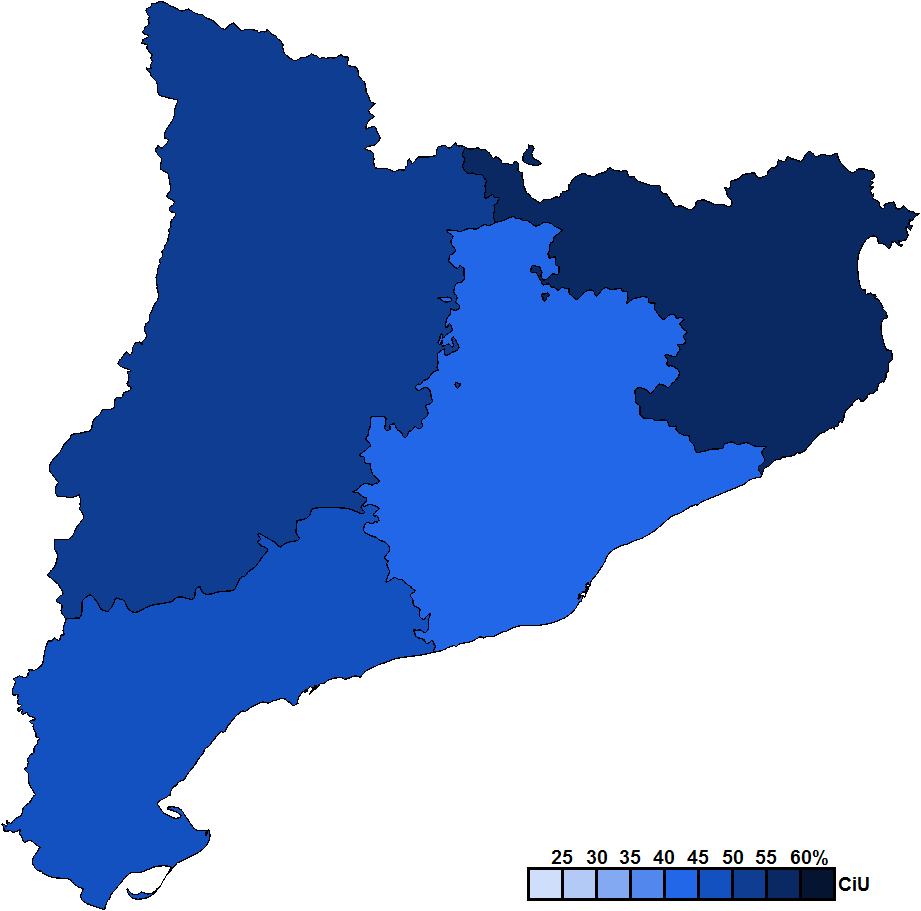
President before election
Jordi Pujol
CDC (CiU)
President after election
Jordi Pujol
CDC (CiU)

A regional election was held in Catalonia on 29 May 1988 to elect the 3rd Parliament of the autonomous community. All 135 seats in the Parliament were up for election.

== Overview ==
Under the 1979 Statute of Autonomy, the Parliament of Catalonia was the unicameral legislature of the homonymous autonomous community, having legislative power in devolved matters, as well as the ability to grant or withdraw confidence from a regional president. The electoral and procedural rules were supplemented by national law provisions.

=== Date ===
The term of the Parliament of Catalonia expired four years after the date of its previous election, unless it was dissolved earlier. The election was required to be called no later than 15 days before the scheduled expiration date of parliament, with election day taking place within 60 days from the call. The previous election was held on 29 April 1984, which meant that the chamber's term would have expired on 29 April 1988. The election was required to be called no later than 14 April 1988, setting the latest possible date for election day on 13 June 1988.

Amendments in 1985 granted the regional president the prerogative to dissolve the Parliament of Catalonia at any given time and call a snap election, provided that no motion of no confidence was in process and that dissolution did not occur before one year after a previous one under this procedure. In the event of an investiture process failing to elect a regional president within a two-month period from the first ballot, the Parliament was to be automatically dissolved and a fresh election called.

The Parliament of Catalonia was officially dissolved on 4 April 1988 with the publication of the corresponding decree in the Official Journal of the Government of Catalonia (DOGC), setting election day for 29 May.

=== Electoral system ===
Voting for the Parliament was based on universal suffrage, comprising all Spanish nationals over 18 years of age, registered in Catalonia and with full political rights, provided that they had not been deprived of the right to vote by a final sentence, nor were legally incapacitated.

The Parliament of Catalonia had a minimum of 100 and a maximum of 150 seats, with electoral provisions fixing its size at 135. All were elected in four multi-member constituencies—corresponding to the provinces of Barcelona, Gerona, Lérida and Tarragona, each of which was assigned a fixed number of seats—using the D'Hondt method and closed-list proportional voting, with a three percent-threshold of valid votes (including blank ballots) in each constituency. The use of this electoral method resulted in a higher effective threshold depending on district magnitude and vote distribution.

As a result of the aforementioned allocation, each Parliament constituency was entitled the following seats:

Seats	Constituencies
85	Barcelona
18	Tarragona
17	Gerona
15	Lérida

The law did not provide for by-elections to fill vacant seats; instead, any vacancies arising after the proclamation of candidates and during the legislative term were filled by the next candidates on the party lists or, when required, by designated substitutes.

== Parties and candidates ==
The electoral law allowed for parties and federations registered in the interior ministry, alliances and groupings of electors to present lists of candidates. Parties and federations intending to form an alliance were required to inform the relevant electoral commission within 10 days of the election call, whereas groupings of electors needed to secure the signature of at least one percent of the electorate in the constituencies for which they sought election, disallowing electors from signing for more than one list.

Below is a list of the main parties and alliances which contested the election:

Candidacy	Parties and alliances	Leading candidate	Ideology	Previous result		Gov.	Ref.
Candidacy	Parties and alliances	Leading candidate	Ideology	Vote %	Seats	Gov.	Ref.
CiU	List: Democratic Convergence of Catalonia (CDC); Democratic Union of Catalonia (UDC)	Jordi Pujol	Catalan nationalism Centrism	46.8%	72	Yes	
PSC–PSOE	List: Socialists' Party of Catalonia (PSC–PSOE)	Raimon Obiols	Social democracy	30.1%	41	No	
AP	List: People's Alliance (AP)	Jorge Fernández Díaz	Conservatism; National conservatism	7.7%	11	No	
IC	List: Unified Socialist Party of Catalonia (PSUC); Party of the Communists of Catalonia (PCC); Agreement of Left Nationalists (ENE)	Rafael Ribó	Eco-socialism; Green politics	9.2%	6	No	
ERC	List: Republican Left of Catalonia (ERC)	Joan Hortalà	Catalan nationalism Left-wing nationalism Social democracy	4.4%	5	No	
CDS	List: Democratic and Social Centre (CDS)	Antoni Fernández Teixidó	Centrism; Liberalism	Did not contest		No	

== Opinion polls ==
The tables below list opinion polling results in reverse chronological order, showing the most recent first and using the dates when the survey fieldwork was done, as opposed to the date of publication. Where the fieldwork dates are unknown, the date of publication is given instead. The highest percentage figure in each polling survey is displayed with its background shaded in the leading party's colour. If a tie ensues, this is applied to the figures with the highest percentages. The "Lead" column on the right shows the percentage-point difference between the parties with the highest percentages in a poll.

=== Voting intention estimates ===
The table below lists weighted voting intention estimates. Refusals are generally excluded from the party vote percentages, while question wording and the treatment of "don't know" responses and those not intending to vote may vary between polling organisations. When available, seat projections determined by the polling organisations are displayed below (or in place of) the percentages in a smaller font; 68 seats were required for an absolute majority in the Parliament of Catalonia.

Color key:

Exit poll

Polling firm/Commissioner	Fieldwork date	Sample size	Turnout	CiU	PSC	AP–PDP–PL	PSUC	ERC	AP	CDS	IC	Lead
1988 regional election	29 May 1988	—N/a	59.4	45.7; 69	29.8; 42	–	(Note: Within IC.)	4.1; 6	5.3; 6	3.8; 3	7.8; 9	15.9
PSC	29 May 1988	?	?	? 66/68	? 42/44	–		? 5/6	? 5/6	? 2/3	? 9/11	?
Antena 3	29 May 1988	?	?	? 73	? 39	–		? 5	? 6	? 2	? 10	?
Sigma Dos/COPE	29 May 1988	10,000	?	? 73/75	? 35/37	–		? 6/7	? 7/8	? 2/3	? 9/10	?
Metra Seis/Cadena SER	29 May 1988	20,000	?	? 73/76	? 37/38	–		? 7	? 5	? 0/1	? 9/11	?
Emopública/RTVE	29 May 1988	40,000	?	? 72/75	? 38/39	–		? 5/7	? 4/6	? 0/3	? 10/13	?
Opina/TV3	29 May 1988	96,600	?	44.0; 68/70	30.0; 40	–		5.0; 6/7	5.0; 5/6	4.0; 3	9.0; 10/11	14.0
Emopública/Diario 16	22 May 1988	1,000	?	45.5; 70/75	28.0; 37/40	–		3.5; 2/3	7.0; 8/10	3.5; 2/3	9.0; 8/11	17.5
Iope–Etmar/El Periódico	22 May 1988	2,800	?	50.2; 78	27.9; 38	–		3.4; 3	5.3; 6	4.2; 3	6.3; 7	22.3
Avui	22 May 1988	?	?	? 76/80	? 37/38	–		? 4/5	? 6/7	? 3	? 6/7	?
Sofemasa/La Vanguardia	17–19 May 1988	1,659	?	48.0; 73/76	29.0; 39/41	–		4.0; 4/5	6.0; 7/8	3.0; 0/2	6.0; 7/8	19.0
Demoscopia/El País	13–17 May 1988	1,600	65	49.3; 73/76	27.7; 38/40	–		3.1; 0/3	6.1; 7/9	3.6; 2/3	5.4; 6/7	21.6
Efe	13 May 1988	?	?	47.7	31.0	–		4.1	5.1	3.0	6.1	16.7
Demoscopia/El País	27–30 Apr 1988	1,600	65–67	47.4; 72/75	28.2; 37/40	–		4.2; 4/6	6.4; 7/9	4.2; 4/6	5.8; 6/7	19.2
Iope–Etmar/El Periódico	25–28 Apr 1988	1,100	?	50.8; 78	27.8; 38	–		3.7; 3	5.6; 7	5.4; 6	3.8; 3	23.0
Gabise/Diario de Barcelona	24 Apr 1988	2,500	?	46.5; 74	30.2; 45	–		4.3; 2	5.2; 6	2.8; 1	6.6; 7	16.3
Sofemasa/La Vanguardia	6–12 Apr 1988	1,000	?	47.0; 69/72	29.0; 40/43	–		5.0; 5	6.0; 7/8	4.0; 3/5	5.0; 6/7	18.0
CIS	5–11 Apr 1988	2,900	?	48.0; 72/73	32.2; 44	–		3.6; 2/3	5.5; 7	3.4; 3	6.2; 6	15.8
Gabise/Diario de Barcelona	20 Mar 1988	2,500	?	53.3; 82	29.4; 42	–		3.8; 2	4.7; 4	2.0; 0	4.8; 5	23.9
Metra Seis/El Independiente	12 Mar 1988	1,800	?	44.0; 68	30.0; 41	–		4.5; 5	6.5; 9	3.0; 2	9.0; 10	14.0
Iope–Etmar/El Periódico	28 Feb 1988	1,000	?	46.2; 71	29.8; 40	–		5.7; 8	5.7; 6	5.7; 5	4.5; 5	16.4
Gabise/Diario de Barcelona	21 Feb 1988	2,425	?	45.9; 69	36.6; 52	–		2.2; 0	4.4; 4	1.0; 0	8.1; 10	9.3
DYM/CIS	25–30 Jan 1988	2,900	?	46.0; 69	32.0; 45	–		? 4	4.0; 6	? 4	7.0; 7	14.0
CIS	3–10 Dec 1987	2,891	?	48.0; 71	32.0; 45	–		–	–	? 2	–	16.0
1987 EP election	10 Jun 1987	—N/a	67.9	27.8 (47)	36.8 (56)	–		3.7 (4)	11.2 (16)	5.6 (7)	5.4 (5)	9.0
1986 general election	22 Jun 1986	—N/a	68.9	32.0 (51)	41.0 (59)	11.4 (18)	(Note: Within UEC.)	2.7 (0)	(Note: Within AP–PDP–PL.)	4.1 (4)	3.9 (Note: Results for UEC in the 1986 general election.) (3)	9.0
Sofemasa/La Vanguardia	16 Nov–1 Dec 1985	980	?	43.0	33.6	3.1	4.9	–		1.3	–	9.4
1984 regional election	29 Apr 1984	—N/a	64.4	46.8; 72	30.1; 41	7.7; 11	5.6; 6	4.4; 5		–	–	16.7

== Results ==
=== Overall ===
← Summary of the 29 May 1988 Parliament of Catalonia election results →
Parties and alliances	Popular vote			Seats	
Parties and alliances	Votes	%	±pp	Total	+/−
Convergence and Union (CiU)	1,232,514	45.72	−1.08	69	−3
Socialists' Party of Catalonia (PSC–PSOE)^{1}	802,828	29.78	−0.36	42	+1
Initiative for Catalonia (IC)^{2}	209,211	7.76	−1.46	9	+3
People's Alliance (AP)^{3}	143,241	5.31	−2.39	6	−5
Republican Left of Catalonia (ERC)	111,647	4.14	−0.27	6	+1
Democratic and Social Centre (CDS)	103,351	3.83	New	3	+3
Green Alternative–Ecologist Movement of Catalonia (AV–MEC)	16,346	0.61	New	0	±0
The Ecologist Greens (EVE)	8,730	0.32	New	0	±0
The Greens (EV)	8,105	0.30	New	0	±0
Ecologist Party of Catalonia–VERDE (PEC–VERDE)	5,927	0.22	−0.08	0	±0
Andalusian Party of Catalonia (PAC)	5,815	0.22	New	0	±0
Workers' Socialist Party (PST)	5,794	0.21	+0.02	0	±0
Social Democratic Party of Catalonia (PSDC)	5,156	0.19	−0.05	0	±0
Spanish Juntas (JJEE)	4,524	0.17	New	0	±0
Communist Unification of Spain (UCE)	3,358	0.12	New	0	±0
Revolutionary Workers' Party of Spain (PORE)	2,727	0.10	+0.01	0	±0
Communist Workers' League (LOC)	2,228	0.08	New	0	±0
Spanish Phalanx of the CNSO (FE–JONS)	2,202	0.08	New	0	±0
Humanist Party of Catalonia (PHC)	2,195	0.08	New	0	±0
Alliance for the Republic (AxR)^{4}	1,119	0.04	−0.08	0	±0
Republican Popular Unity (UPR)^{5}	1,066	0.04	−0.02	0	±0
Centrist Unity–Democratic Spanish Party (PED)	905	0.03	New	0	±0
Blank ballots	16,946	0.63	+0.13		
Total	2,695,935			135	±0
Valid votes	2,695,935	99.49	+0.01		
Invalid votes	13,750	0.51	−0.01		
Votes cast / turnout	2,709,685	59.37	−4.99		
Abstentions	1,854,704	40.63	+4.99		
Registered voters	4,564,389				
Sources
Footnotes: ^{1} Socialists' Party of Catalonia results are compared to the combined totals of Socialists' Party of Catalonia and Unity of Aran–Aranese Nationalist Party in the 1984 election.; ^{2} Initiative for Catalonia results are compared to the combined totals of Unified Socialist Party of Catalonia, Party of the Communists of Catalonia and Agreement of the Catalan Left in the 1984 election.; ^{3} People's Alliance results are compared to People's Coalition totals in the 1984 election.; ^{4} Alliance for the Republic results are compared to Internationalist Socialist Workers' Party totals in the 1984 election.; ^{5} Republican Popular Unity results are compared to Communist Party of Spain (Marxist–Leninist) totals in the 1984 election.

Popular vote
CiU	45.72%
PSC–PSOE	29.78%
IC	7.76%
AP	5.31%
ERC	4.14%
CDS	3.83%
Others	2.83%
Blank ballots	0.63%

Seats
CiU	51.11%
PSC–PSOE	31.11%
IC	6.67%
AP	4.44%
ERC	4.44%
CDS	2.22%

=== Distribution by constituency ===
Constituency	CiU		PSC		IC		AP		ERC		CDS	
Constituency	%	S	%	S	%	S	%	S	%	S	%	S
Barcelona	43.6	39	31.4	28	8.8	8	5.2	4	3.7	3	3.8	3
Gerona	56.3	11	23.6	5	3.9	−	3.7	−	5.5	1	3.2	−
Lérida	53.8	9	23.1	4	3.6	−	6.2	1	5.9	1	4.3	−
Tarragona	47.6	10	27.0	5	5.5	1	7.1	1	5.3	1	4.0	−
Total	45.7	69	29.8	42	7.8	9	5.3	6	4.1	6	3.8	3

== Aftermath ==
=== Government formation ===
Investiture; Nomination of Jordi Pujol (CDC)
Ballot →	22 June 1988
Required majority →	68 out of 135
Yes: • CiU (69)	69 / 135
No: • PSC (41); • IC (9); • ERC (6)	56 / 135
Abstentions: • AP (6); • CDS (3)	9 / 135
Absentees: • PSC (1)	1 / 135

== Bibliography ==
- Ley Orgánica 4/1979, de 18 de diciembre, de Estatuto de Autonomía de Cataluña (Organic Law 4/1979). Official State Gazette (in Spanish). 18 December 1979. BOE-A-1979-30178.
- Ley 3/1982, de 23 de marzo, del Parlamento, del Presidente y del Consejo Ejecutivo de la Generalidad (Law 3/1982). Official State Gazette (in Spanish). 23 March 1982. BOE-A-1982-10330.
- Ley 8/1985, de 24 de mayo, de modificación de la Ley 3/1982, de 23 de marzo, del Parlamento, del Presidente y del Consejo Ejecutivo de la Generalidad de Cataluña (Law 8/1985). Official State Gazette (in Spanish). 24 May 1985. BOE-A-1985-16307.
- Ley Orgánica 5/1985, de 19 de junio, del Régimen Electoral General (Organic Law 5/1985). Official State Gazette (in Spanish). 19 June 1985 [version as of 3 April 1987]. BOE-A-1985-11672.
- Decreto 64/1988, de 3 de abril, de disolución y convocatoria de elecciones al Parlamento de Cataluña (PDF) (Decree 64/1988). Official Journal of the Government of Catalonia (in Spanish). 3 April 1988.
