= Unified Socialist Party of Catalonia =

Dissolved political party in Spain

Unified Socialist Party of Catalonia Partit Socialista Unificat de Catalunya
- Founded: 23 July 1936
- Dissolved: 22 February 1997
- Merger of: Catalan Federation of the PSOE; Communist Party of Catalonia; Socialist Union of Catalonia; Proletarian Catalan Party
- Merged into: Initiative for Catalonia
- Youth wing: Unified Socialist Youth of Catalonia (1936–1970); Communist Youth of Catalonia (1970–1992)
- Women's wing: Women's Democratic Movement
- Ideology: Communism; Catalan nationalism Republicanism
- Political position: Far-left
- Regional affiliation: Union of the Catalan Left (1986–1987); Initiative for Catalonia (1987–1997)
- International affiliation: Comintern (1936–1943)
- Trade union affiliation: Workers' Commissions (CCOO)

The Unified Socialist Party of Catalonia (Catalan: Partit Socialista Unificat de Catalunya, PSUC) was a communist political party active in Catalonia between 1936 and 1997. It was the Catalan branch of the Communist Party of Spain and the only party not from a sovereign state to be a full member of the Third International.

== History ==
The PSUC was formed on 23 July 1936 through the unification of four left-wing groups; the small Catalan Federation of Spanish Socialist Workers' Party (PSOE), the Partit Comunista de Catalunya (Communist Party of Catalonia, the Catalan branch of the Communist Party of Spain, PCE), the Unió Socialista de Catalunya (Socialist Union of Catalonia) and the Partit Català Proletari (Proletarian Catalan Party. a Catalan separatist far left party). Burnett Bolloten estimates that at unification, the party numbered some 2,500 members. Nine months later, the party ranks had swollen to 50,000 members.

The first leaders of the PSUC were Joan Comorera and Rafael Vidiella, both from the ranks of socialism. Comorera, a former USC leader, was elected general secretary of the new party, and Miquel Valdés, of the PCC, became secretary of the organization. Other leaders or prominent people of the PSUC came from the old PCC, as was the case of Víctor Colomer, Pere Ardiaca, José del Barrio Navarro, Antonio Sesé or Hilari Arlandis. Vidiella, Sesé or Del Barrio also came from the UGT workers union (del Barrio was secretary of the UGT in Catalonia) and a long time ago they had been members of the CNT.

PSUC foundation poster

PSUC Civil War poster

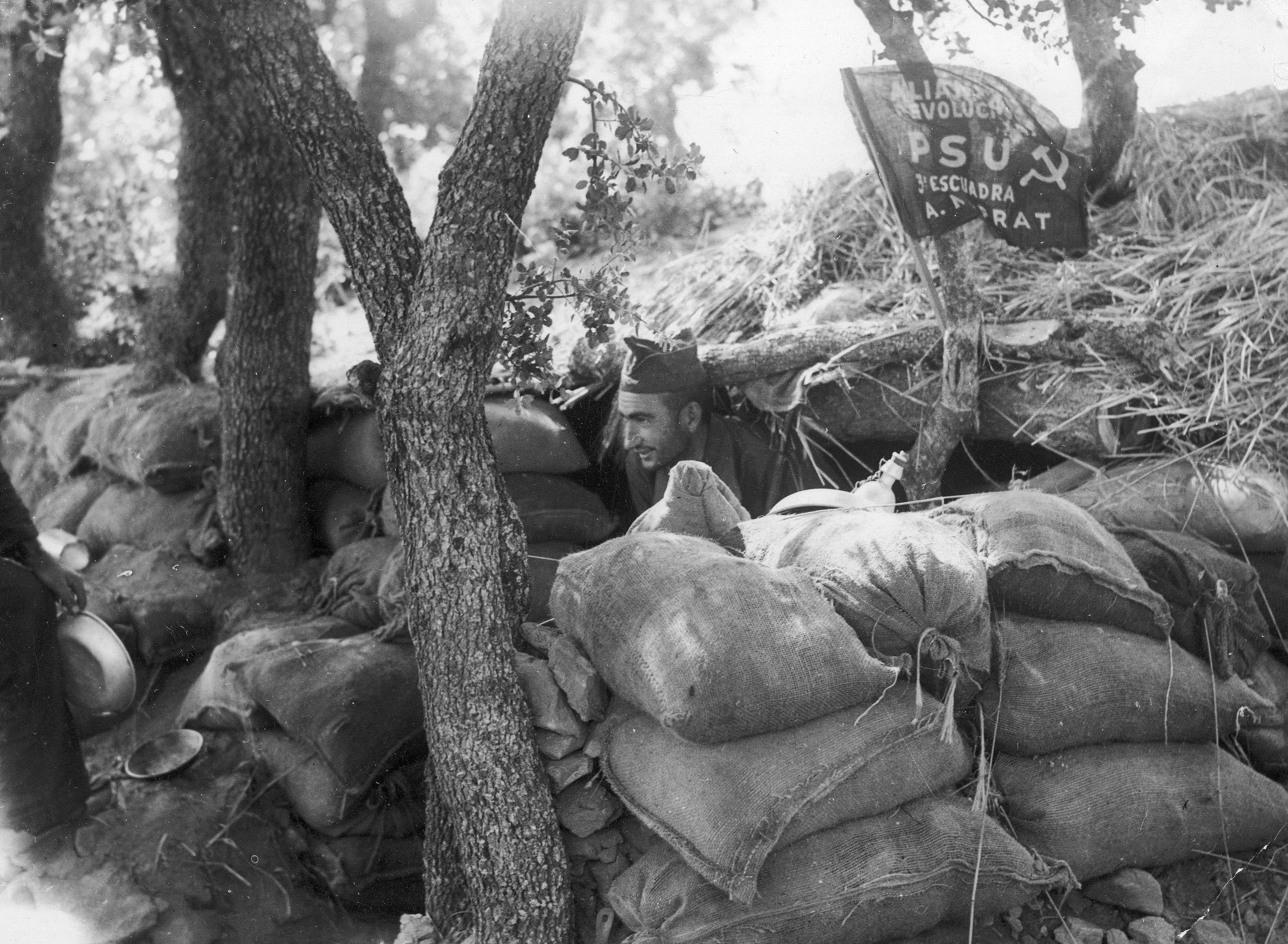
PSUC militia men in a field fortification opposing Franco's nationalists in the city of Huesca on the Aragon front, 1936.

The PSUC played a major role during the days of the Second Spanish Republic and the Spanish Civil War, and was the only non-state party affiliated to the Comintern. The PCE did not organize in Catalonia, but saw PSUC as its Catalan referent. This setup has been replicated by other Catalan communist groups. The setup is somewhat similar to the relation between the Christian Democratic Union of Germany and Christian Social Union of Bavaria. The PSUC defended the self-determination of Catalonia in accordance with Lenin's defense of the right of nations to self-determination, but not an explicit independentist position.

During the war, the Party took part in the fight against fascism following the slogan of anti-fascist unity, and after the initial veto of the CNT, it participated in the government of the Generalitat de Catalunya with several ministries. It had a conflicting relationship with the large National Confederation of Labour (CNT) and the small rival Workers' Party of Marxist Unification (POUM).

At the beginning of the war the PSUC came to organize the "Carles Marx" Column, formed by militants from both the party and the UGT union and under the leadership of Del Barrio and Trueba, who went to the Front of Aragon in the early days of the struggle. Later this militia would serve as a base for the formation of the 27.ª Division of the Republican Army, a unit that had a prominent intervention in several military operations. In the rear, the JSUC (youth branch) led by Lina Odena and Margarida Abril played an important role in carrying out numerous tasks for the war effort, or also in recruiting volunteers for the Republican Army.

Allied with the government of Companys, of Catalan Republican Left (ERC), it faced the POUM and the initial dominion of the CNT, in a permanent political confrontation which ended with the events of May 1937, that marked the end of the stage of greater anarcho-syndicalist dominion in Catalonia.

PSUC members held positions of conseller (minister) in the governments of Lluís Companys between 1936 and 1939: Joan Comorera, as Minister of Public Services, Miquel Valdés as Minister of Labor, Rafael Vidiella as minister of Justice, Miquel Serra i Pàmies and Josep Miret i Musté conseller of supplies. Also a member of PSUC, Josep Moix i Regàs, was minister of Labor in Spanish republican government led by socialist Juan Negrin.

However, as the war progressed, the Republican cause was increasingly confronted with defeat. After the fall of Catalonia in February 1939, most of its leaders fled to France, although many of its cadres remained in Spain and suffered the repression of the Franco dictatorship.

In French exile they collaborated in the resistance against the Nazi occupation, and some of its members and leaders died in concentration camps, such as Josep Miret i Musté in Mauthausen in 1944.

In Francoist Spain, the PSUC was outlawed and remained active clandestinely in Catalonia and in exile, in France and Mexico.

Inside, they carried out a strong clandestine task that provoked strong repression. In January 1940, the first PSUC leadership was arrested underground. Alejandro Matos was killed at the police station. Otilio Alba Polo and Tomás Pons were executed. In 1942, Jaume Girabau, Isidoro Diéguez Dueñas and Jesús Larrañaga were executed after illegally arriving from Mexico and arrested at the Portuguese border.

Josep Serradell Román and Margarida Abril were more successful in 1943, while Joaquim Puig i Pidemunt republished Treball magazine and in 1944 Miquel Núñez González directed the guerrilla units of the Agrupació Guerrillera de Catalunya. In 1945, the March Resolution was agreed, the first political elaboration of the PSUC carried out in the interior where the impetus of the guerrilla struggle, the anti-fascist unity, and confidence in the victory of the allies would lead to the overthrow of the Franco's regime.

But falls and repression were too frequent. Francesc Serrat Pujolar and Joan Arévalo Gallardo were executed in 1946, and in 1947 the so-called fall of the eighties took place. In 1948 Gregori López Raimundo arrived in Catalonia, and the party agreed to the dissolution of the guerrilla groups. In 1949, Joaquim Puig Puidemunt, Numen Mestre Ferrando, Angel Carrero Sancho and Pere Valverde were executed in Barcelona. At the same time, the relationship with the PCE, despite mutual recognition, often had frictions due to the PCE leadership's attempts to limit the organic sovereignty of the PSUC, as a result of these frictions Joan Comorera was expelled from the PSUC accused of 'titoism' and 'nationalist deviations' and entered Catalonia clandestinely in 1951, where he was arrested by the Francoist authorities in 1954 and sentenced to 30 years in prison, He died in the prison of Burgos in 1958.

The leadership of the PSUC in exile would later be formed by Josep Moix, Rafael Vidiella, Wenceslau Colomer i Colomer, Josep Romeu, Margarida Abril and Pere Ardiaca. The direction inside takes strength. Gregori López Raimundo was arrested as a result of the 1951 tram strike. In 1956, the First Congress of the PSUC was held in France, where a new political and organizational starting point was proposed. 50 delegates from exile and the interior (university students and workers) take part. The policy of national reconciliation is approved. The Executive Committee is made up of: Josep Moix (Secretary General), Margarida Abril, Pere Ardiaca, Josep Bonifaci, Emilià Fàbregas, Gregori López Raimundo, Miquel Núñez, Carles Rebellón, Josep Serradell "Román", Antoni Senserrich and Rafael Vidiella.

In the following years, Emili Fàbregas, Miquel Núñez González, Carles Rebellón in 1960, Vicente Cazcarra in 1961, Antoni Gutiérrez Díaz and Pere Ardiaca in 1962 were arrested and imprisoned.

Josep Sendrós and Leonor Bornau are in charge of coordinating Treball and publishing a new magazine, Horitzons. In 1965, the II Congress of the PSUC was held in France, with the participation of 90 delegates, who approved a line of impetus to the student and labor movement. Thus it collaborated in the formation of union Working Commissions (CCOO). The line proved to be successful, and laid the foundations for the growing hegemony of the party in the fight against the Franco regime in Catalonia. Its influence among intellectuals and Catalan culture also grew.

PSUC continued in the 1960s decade organizing the neighborhood movement, workers commissions, the Democratic Student Union, and other mass experiences. In 1969 it participated in the Coordination of Political Forces of Catalonia and in 1971 in the Assembly of Catalonia (Assemblea de Catalunya), where his representative was Antoni Gutierrez Díaz. In 1973, the III Congress of the PSUC was held with the participation of 200 delegates. In 1975 he took part in the Council of Political Forces of Catalonia, sending Josep Solé i Barberà and Gregori López Raimundo as representatives.

The PSUC was the largest opposition party in Catalonia and upon Spain's transformation into a democratic state and constitutional monarchy, it became a mass party with more than 40.000 active members.

In 1977, during the Spanish transition to democracy, the PSUC was legalized after the PCE. He participated in the negotiations for the restoration of the Autonomy of Catalonia and the Statute.

In the first elections to the Parliament of Catalonia (1980) it was the third political force, with nearly 600,000 votes and 25 elected MPs.

PSUC aligned itself with the Eurocommunism of the Italian, Spanish and French Communist parties, but the rejection of much of the grassroots and some leaders led to the withdrawal of this term in the V Congress, in 1981. The party experienced a severe crisis and division. Tensions continued between the three factions, so-called Eurocommunists led by Antoni Gutierrez and Lopez Raimundo, the 'Leninists' led by Paco Frutos and the 'Historic' leftist prosovietic faction led by Pere Ardiaca. Under pressure from Santiago Carrillo (General Secretary of PCE) Eurocommunists and 'leninists' joined forces to expel prosoviet faction, led by Pere Ardiaca who would found the PCC (Communists Party of Catalonia) in 1982 claiming legitimacy of V Congress.

After the split, the election results fell sharply, with only 160,000 votes for the PSUC and 71,000 for the PCC in the 1984 Catalan parliamentary election.

From 1986 onwards, the strong mobilizations against Spain's accession to NATO alliance, and the NATO referendum in which Catalonia won the NO, led to a process of political convergence within the Catalan left.

Antoni Gutiérrez resigned as general secretary in 1986 and the central committee elected Rafael Ribó as his successor. The PSUC ran in coalition with the Entesa dels Nacionalistes d'Esquerra (Catalan left nationalist party) in the 1986 Spanish general election, but won only one seat. The collaboration between the PSUC and ENE was extended by the municipal elections of 1987 with the incorporation of the Partit dels Comunistes de Catalunya PCC into a federation of political parties that adopted the name of Iniciativa per Catalunya, which would be set up in 1989.

As PSUC became later involved in Iniciativa per Catalunya (IC) first, and Iniciativa per Catalunya-Els Verds, with the merger of some green and ecologist movements, it ceased acting as a separate party. When PSUC was finally submerged into ICV in 1997, a splinter group refounded the party as PSUC-viu (Living PSUC). PSUC-Viu became the new referent of PCE in Catalonia.The PSUC Viu would later form the United Left and Alternative coalition together with the PCC, and would later ally with the other heirs of the PSUC in the ICV-EUiA coalition.

They have been running together since 2003 in the elections to the Parliament of Catalonia, ICV-EUiA were part of the government of Catalonia between 2003 and 2010 in coalition with the PSC and ERC. In the Catalan governments led by presidents Pasqual Maragall and later by Josep Montilla, three former PSUC militants held the position of ministers: Francesc Baltasar, Salvador Milà and Joan Saura.

in 2015 ICV and EUIA formed a broader coalition with Podemos and Equo to form Catalunya En Comú Podem to contest the elections to the Parliament of Catalonia and En Comú Podem (ECP) to the Spanish Parliament.

In the 2015 Spanish election ECP was placed as the first force in Catalonia, with 12 seats and 927,940 votes. In the Catalan elections of 2017 the coalition obtained 8 deputies and 7.46% of votes. In the November 2019 Spanish election It fell to 4th position, with 14.2% and 7 deputies.

== Electoral performance ==
=== Parliament of Catalonia ===
Date		Votes			Seats		Status	Size
Date	Leader	#	%	±pp	#	±	Status	Size
1980	Josep Benet	507,753	18.8%	—	25 / 135	—	Opposition	3rd
1984	Antoni Gutiérrez	160,581	5.6%	–13.2	6 / 135	19	Opposition	4th
1988	Rafael Ribó	209,211	7.8%	+2.2	6 / 135	0	Opposition	*
1992	Rafael Ribó	171,794	6.5%	–1.3	6 / 135	0	Opposition	*
1995	Rafael Ribó	313,092	9.7%	+2.8	9 / 135	3	Opposition	**

- * Within Initiative for Catalonia.
- ** Within Initiative for Catalonia–The Greens.

=== Cortes Generales ===
Election	Leader	Votes	%	#	Seats		Outcome	Notes
Election	Leader	Votes	%	#	Congress	Senate	Outcome	Notes
1977	Antoni Gutiérrez Díaz	558,132	18.31	#2	8 / 47	0 / 16	UCD minority	
1979	Antoni Gutiérrez Díaz	512,792	17.38	#3	8 / 47	0 / 16	UCD minority	
1982	Francisco Frutos	158.553	4.61	#4	1 / 47	0 / 16	PSOE majority	
1986	Antoni Gutiérrez Díaz	123,912	3.91	#4	1 / 47	0 / 16	PSOE majority	Within Union of the Catalan Left (UEC)
1989	Rafel Ribó	231,472	7.37%	#4	3/47	0/16		

== See also ==
- List of political parties in Catalonia
