= Initiative for Catalonia Greens =

Political party in Spain

Initiative for Catalonia Greens Iniciativa per Catalunya Verds
- President: Dolors Camats and Joan Herrera (national coordinators)
- Founded: 23 February 1987 (coalition); 20 January 1990 (party)
- Dissolved: 6 July 2019
- Succeeded by: Green Left
- Headquarters: C/ Ciutat, 7; 08002 Barcelona
- Youth wing: Joves d'Esquerra Verda
- Ideology: Eco-socialism; Regionalism
- Political position: Left-wing
- Regional affiliation: ICV–EUiA (2003–2015); Catalunya Sí que es Pot (2015–2017); En Comú Podem (2015–2019) (Note: Since 2017 integrated within Catalunya en Comú); Catalunya en Comú (2017–2019)
- European affiliation: European Green Party
- International affiliation: Global Greens
- Colours: Green, Red

Website
- www.iniciativa.cat

Initiative for Catalonia Greens (Catalan: Iniciativa per Catalunya Verds, ICV; IPA: [inisi.əˈtiβə pəɾ kətəˈluɲə ˈβɛɾts]) was an eco-socialist political party in Catalonia. It was formed as a merger of Iniciativa per Catalunya and Els Verds. IC had been an alliance led by Partit Socialista Unificat de Catalunya and was the equivalent of Izquierda Unida in Catalonia. IC later developed into a political party, and PSUC was dissolved. The youth of ICV was called Joves d'Esquerra Verda (Green Left Youth). It used to be called JambI, Joves amb Iniciativa (Youth with Initiative).

In the elections to the European Parliament in 2004 ICV ran on the Izquierda Unida list. One MEP, Raül Romeva, was elected from ICV which joined the Green Group. The ICV formed part of the past ruling tripartite coalition (along with the Socialist Party of Catalonia and the Republican Left of Catalonia, a left-wing Catalan Nationalist Party) in the Generalitat of Catalonia. The coalition governed Catalonia from 2004-2010. ICV was given responsibility for the Ministry of the Environment in the share-out of power in the new government. Initiative for Catalonia Greens had an agreement of mutual association with Equo. It was dissolved in 2019. In July 2020 it was announced that the party would be re-founded as Green Left.

== Ideology ==
Iniciativa per Catalunya Verds called itself an "ecosocialist" party and its members were therefore "ecosocialists". This ideology is summarized in the book The Ecosocialist Manifesto, co-written by a number of left-wing green politicians. This ideology looks to renew the left and is firmly against communism as practised in the former Soviet Union and against capitalism, as practised by Margaret Thatcher and Ronald Reagan, but also against social democracy, which it considers as only a lesser evil that does not respond to the environmental and social challenges ahead. From an ecosocialist point of view, both communism and capitalism are two faces of the productivist "mode of production" (a Marxist term), which should be phased out if the ecological health of the planet is to survive. The manifesto also considers this ideology to be deeply feminist and in favour of the "freedom of the European peoples" (i.e. for self-determination for the Basque Country, Galicia or Catalonia). The party voted in favour of the Catalan parliament's declaration defining Catalonia as a "sovereign political and juridical entity" ("subjecte polític i jurídic sobirà") in 2013.

== Presidents ==
1. Rafael Ribó i Massó (1987–2000)
2. Joan Saura (2000–present)

== Electoral results ==
=== Spanish Parliament ===
==== Congress of Deputies ====
Election year	# of overall votes	% of overall vote	# of overall seats won	±	Notes
2000	119,290	0.5	1 / 350		
2004	234,790	0.9	2 / 350	▲1	
2008	183,338	0.7	1 / 350	▼1	
2011	280,152	1.2	3 / 350	▲2	

=== Catalan Parliament ===
Election year	# of overall votes	% of overall vote	# of overall seats won	±	Notes
1988	209,211	7.7 (#3)	9 / 135		
1992	171,794	6.5 (#4)	7 / 135	▼2	
1995	313,092	9.7 (#5)	11 / 135	▲4	
1999	78,441	2.5 (#5)	3 / 135	▼8	
2003	241,163	7.2 (#5)	9 / 135	▲6	
2006	282,693	9.5 (#5)	12 / 135	▲3	
2010	229,985	7.4 (#4)	10 / 135	▼2	
2012	358,857	9.9 (#5)	13 / 135	▲3	

=== European Parliament ===
Election year	# of overall votes	% of overall vote	# of overall seats won	±	Notes
2009	119,755	6.1 (#5)	1 / 50		Part of a joint list with United Left
2014	258,554	10.3 (#4)	1 / 54		Part of a joint list with United Left

== See also ==
- Green party
- Green politics
- List of environmental organizations
- Politics of Catalonia
