= People's Party of Catalonia =

People's Party of Catalonia Partit Popular de Catalunya
- President: Alejandro Fernández Álvarez
- Secretary-General: Santi Rodríguez Serra
- Founded: January 1989
- Headquarters: Calle Urgell, 249; 08036, Barcelona
- Youth wing: New Generations of Catalonia
- Ideology: Conservatism; Christian democracy; Spanish unionism
- Political position: Centre-right to right-wing
- National affiliation: People's Party
- Parliament of Catalonia: 15 / 135
- Congress of Deputies (Catalan seats): 6 / 48
- Spanish Senate (Catalan seats): 1 / 24
- Mayors (2023-2027): 6 / 946
- Local Government (2023-2027): 196 / 9,077

Website
- www.ppcatalunya.com

The People's Party of Catalonia (Catalan: Partit Popular de Catalunya, Spanish: Partido Popular de Cataluña, PP or PPC) is a conservative, Christian-democratic political party in Catalonia. It is the Catalan affiliate of the Spanish People's Party and holds strongly unionist positions.

== Electoral performance ==
=== Parliament of Catalonia ===
Parliament of Catalonia
Election	Leading candidate	Votes	%	Seats	+/–	Government
1992	Alejo Vidal-Quadras	157,772	5.97 (#5)	7 / 135	1	Opposition
1995	Alejo Vidal-Quadras	421,752	13.08 (#3)	17 / 135	10	Opposition
1999	Alberto Fernández Díaz	297,265	9.51 (#3)	12 / 135	5	Confidence and supply
2003	Josep Piqué	393,499	11.89 (#4)	15 / 135	3	Opposition
2006	Josep Piqué	316,222	10.65 (#4)	14 / 135	1	Opposition
2010	Alicia Sánchez-Camacho	387,066	12.37 (#3)	18 / 135	4	Opposition
2012	Alicia Sánchez-Camacho	471,681	12.98 (#4)	19 / 135	1	Opposition
2015	Xavier García Albiol	349,193	8.49 (#5)	11 / 135	8	Opposition
2017	Xavier García Albiol	185,670	4.24 (#7)	4 / 135	7	Opposition
2021	Alejandro Fernández	109,445	3.85 (#8)	3 / 135	1	Opposition
2024	Alejandro Fernández	342,584	10.97 (#4)	15 / 135	12	Opposition

=== Cortes Generales ===
Cortes Generales
Election	Catalonia						
Election	Congress					Senate	
Election	Votes	%	#	Seats	+/–	Seats	+/–
1989	336,015	10.64%	3rd	4 / 46	2	0 / 16	0
1993	624,493	17.04%	3rd	8 / 47	4	0 / 16	0
1996	698,400	17.96%	3rd	8 / 46	0	0 / 16	0
2000	768,318	22.79%	3rd	12 / 46	4	0 / 16	0
2004	626,107	15.58%	4th	6 / 47	6	0 / 16	0
2008	610,473	16.40%	3rd	8 / 47	2	0 / 16	0
2011	716,371	20.70%	3rd	11 / 47	3	0 / 16	0
2015	418,369	11.12%	6th	5 / 47	6	0 / 16	0
2016	464,538	13.36%	5th	6 / 47	1	0 / 16	0
2019 (Apr)	200,841	4.84%	6th	1 / 48	5	0 / 16	0
2019 (Nov)	287,714	7.42%	5th	2 / 48	1	0 / 16	0
2023	473,620	13.37%	3rd	6 / 48	4	0 / 16	0

=== European Parliament ===
European Parliament
Election	Catalonia		
Election	Votes	%	#
1989	204,624	8.60%	3rd
1994	473,716	18.50%	3rd
1999	486,471	16.90%	3rd
2004	377,104	17.81%	2nd
2009	354,876	18.02%	3rd
2014	246,698	9.81%	5th
2019	176,752	5.16%	6th
