= Alejo Vidal-Quadras Roca =

Spanish politician and radiation physicist (born 1945)

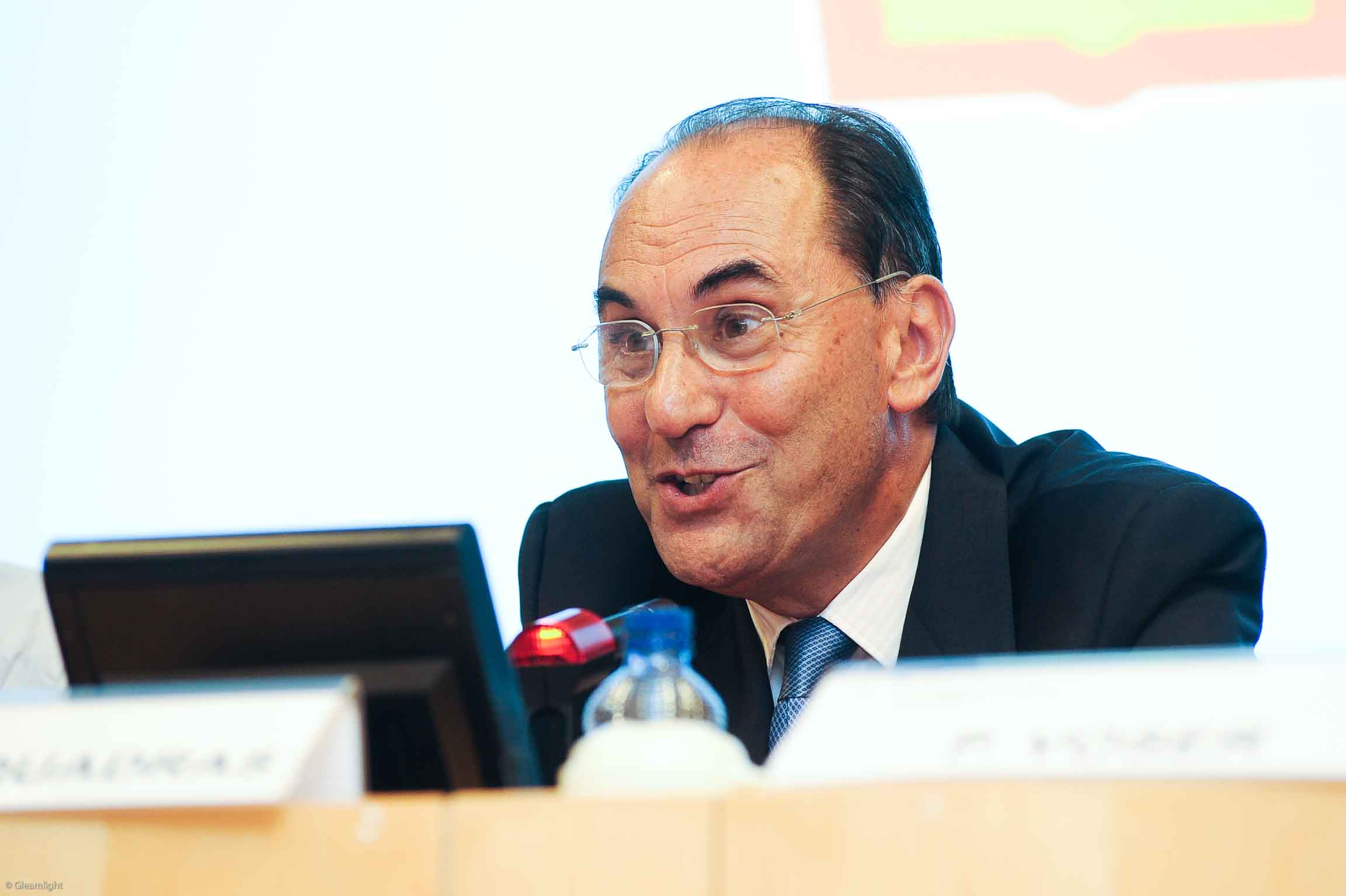

First Vice-President of the European Parliament
- In office 30 July 2004 – 16 January 2007
- President: Josep Borrell
- Preceded by: Office established
- Succeeded by: Rodi Kratsa-Tsagaropoulou

Member of the European Parliament for Spain
- In office 13 June 1999 – 1 July 2014

Member of the Senate
- In office 29 June 1996 – 28 August 1999
- Constituency: Parliament of Catalonia

President of the People's Party of Catalonia
- In office 9 January 1991 – 28 September 1996
- Preceded by: Jorge Fernández Díaz
- Succeeded by: Alberto Fernández Díaz

Member of the Parliament of Catalonia for Barcelona
- In office 29 May 1988 – 25 August 1996

Member of the Barcelona City Council
- In office 10 June 1987 – 26 May 1991

Personal details
- Born: Alejo Vidal-Quadras Roca; 20 May 1945 (age 81) Barcelona, Spain
- Party: Vox (2014–2015)
- Other political affiliations: People's Alliance (1983–1989); People's Party (1989–2014)

Alejo Vidal-Quadras Roca (born 20 May 1945) is a Spanish former politician and radiation physicist. Born in Barcelona, he served as a Member of the European Parliament (MEP) from 1999 to 2014 and as First Vice-President of the European Parliament from 2004 to 2007. He survived an assassination attempt in 2023, he says was ordered by Iran, which became known in Spain as "The Sunflower case".

== Career ==
Vidal-Quadras was elected on the People's Party ticket and sat with the European People's Party group. In 2014, he announced that he was leaving the People's Party for a new party, Vox. He was the frontrunner for Vox in the 2014 European election, but the party failed to win a seat. He is a member of the European Friends of Israel, a lobby group aiming to defend Israel's interests within the European Union.

== Relationship with Iran ==
In 2013 El País reported that 35 Iranian dissidents said to be affiliated to the National Council of Resistance of Iran (NCRI) gave Vox about one million euros. According to Vidal-Quadras, the donations were not made to Vox but to himself.

After 2014, Vidal-Quadras operated pro bono the International Committee in Search of Justice (ISJ), a Brussels-based lobby supporting the NCRI against the Iranian government.

Vidal-Quadras has aligned with People's Mojahedin of Iran, which led the Iranian Foreign Ministry to impose sanctions on him in 2023. The Iran Foreign Ministry accused Vidal-Quadras of "supporting terrorism and terrorist groups" while Maryam Rajavi said that "Prof. Vidal-Quadras has dedicated an important part of his life to fight against [Iran's ruling religious fascism]".

=== Attempted assassination ===
On 9 November 2023, Vidal-Quadras was shot in the face in Madrid by a person on a motorbike in Calle de Núñez de Balboa at 1:30 p.m. local time. He was taken to hospital and was described as recovering after suffering a fracture on his jawbone that required surgery. The assassination attempt is being investigated as a possible terrorist attack. On November 21, Spanish police arrested three people in connection to the shooting.

Vidal-Quadras has claimed that Iran was behind the attempted assassination. According to Vidal-Quadras, his connection to the National Council of Resistance of Iran, an Iranian opposition group, could be linked to the assassination attempt. To date, eight people have been arrested, including Mehrez Ayari who is linked to the Mocro Maffia. Sami Bekal Bounouare, a Palma-born man believed to be the mastermind behind the attack, remains at large.

Vidal-Quadras is one of the first politicians that Tehran has added to their terrorist list. The Iranian opposition attributes the authorship to religious fascist elements that govern the country. In 2019 Vidal-Quadras stated that he considers the Iranian regime a cruel dictatorship which foments terrorism. He is the first European politician to be targeted within Europe.

=== Aftermath ===
In January 2024, a suspect in the assassination attempt was arrested in Colombia. Currently four individuals have been arrested in connection with the shooting, while the alleged shooter, a French citizen of Tunisian descent with multiple prior convictions in France, is still at large.

Also Vidal-Quadras called for a change in the EU policy towards the Islamic Republic to avoid trying to "appease, to negotiate, to dialogue and to make concessions".

== Political positions ==
Alejo Vidal-Quadras defines himself as liberal-conservative. He is the founder of far-right political party Vox, and is opposed to abortion rights and gay marriage.

== Personal life ==
He currently lives off his pensions as a former university professor and a former member of the European Parliament. In addition to serving in the European Parliament, he has occupied several elected positions in Spain: he was a member of the Barcelona City Council (1987–1991), member of the Parliament of Catalonia (1988–1996) and Senator in the Spanish Senate (1996–1999).

== Books about politics ==
- "Cuestión de fondo" (Editorial Montesinos, 1993);
- "Amarás a tu tribu" (Editorial Planeta, 1998);
- "Ahora, cambio de rumbo" (Editorial Planeta, 2012).
