= The Greens–The Ecologist Alternative =

The Greens–The Ecologist Alternative Els Verds–L'Alternativa Ecologista
- Founded: 1989
- Ideology: Ecologism
- National affiliation: The Greens–Ecologist Confederation of Catalonia(1993-1995)

The Greens–The Ecologist Alternative (Catalan: Els Verds–L'Alternativa Ecologista, EV–AE) is a political party based in Catalonia, founded in 1989 as The Greens–Green Union. In 1993 it joined The Greens–Ecologist Confederation of Catalonia, only to split from it in 1995. Until 2006 it would be mostly known as Ecologist Alternative of Catalonia.
