= Rafael Ribó =

Catalan politician (born 1945)

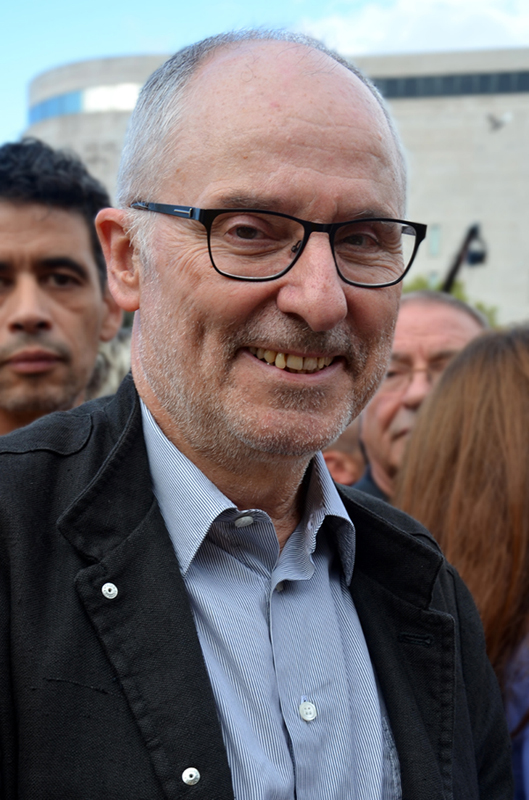
Rafael Ribó Portrait

Rafael Ribó Massó (born 10 May 1945 in Barcelona, Catalonia) is a Catalan politician.

== Education ==
He has degrees in economics and law from the University of Barcelona, and also holds a PhD in political, economic and business science from the same university. He also has a Master of Arts political science degree from The New School for Social Research of New York City.

== Biography ==
In 1963, during the Francoist State, Ribó was a member of Barcelona University's Student's Syndicate (Sindicato Democrático de Estudiantes de la Universidad de Barcelona), the Assembly of Intellectuals (Asamblea de Intelectuales), and in 1977 took part in the Catalan Culture Congress.

On 17 June 2004 the Catalan parliament elected him to ombudsman (Síndic de Greuges (in Catalan), Síndico de Agravios (in Spanish)) for the autonomic region of Catalonia. He has been reelected several times to this position, which he still held in October 2021.

On 15 March 2020 he tested positive for COVID-19.
