= Tarragona (Parliament of Catalonia constituency) =

Coordinates: 41°10′N 1°00′W

- Parliament of Catalonia; Electoral constituency
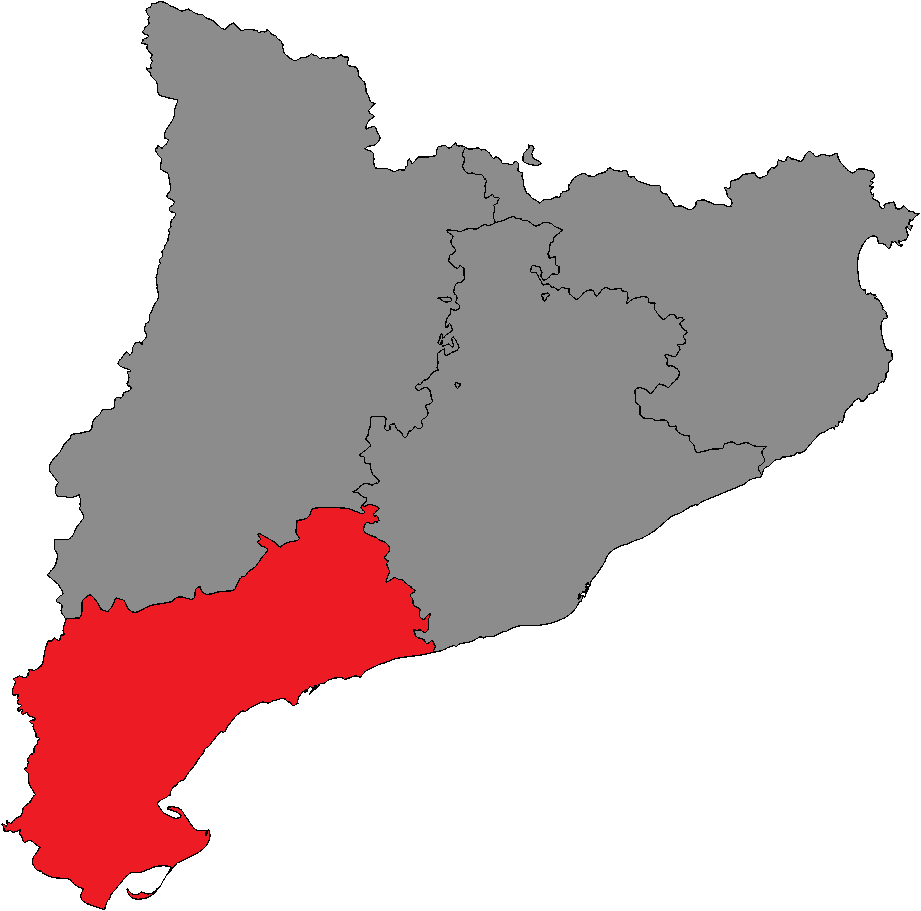
- Location of Tarragona within Catalonia
- Province: Tarragona
- Autonomous community: Catalonia
- Population: ▲861,531 (2024)
- Electorate: ▲604,236 (2024)
- Major settlements: Tarragona, Reus

Current constituency
- Created: 1980
- Seats: 18
- Members: PSC (6); Cat–Junts+ (5); ERC (3); PP (2); Vox (2)

Tarragona is one of the four constituencies (Spanish: circunscripciones) represented in the Parliament of Catalonia, the regional legislature of the autonomous community of Catalonia. The constituency currently elects 18 deputies. Its boundaries correspond to those of the Spanish province of Tarragona. The electoral system uses the D'Hondt method and closed-list proportional representation, with a minimum threshold of three percent.

== Electoral system ==
The constituency was created as per the Statute of Autonomy of Catalonia of 1979 and was first contested in the 1980 regional election. The Statute requires for an electoral law to be passed by a two-thirds supermajority in the Parliament of Catalonia, but transitory provisions provide for the four provinces in Catalonia—Barcelona, Girona, Lleida and Tarragona—to be established as multi-member districts in the Parliament. Each constituency is allocated a fixed number of seats: 85 for Barcelona, 17 for Girona, 15 for Lleida and 18 for Tarragona.

Voting is on the basis of universal suffrage, which comprises all nationals over eighteen, registered in Catalonia and in full enjoyment of their political rights. Amendments to the electoral law in 2011 required for Catalans abroad to apply for voting before being permitted to vote, a system known as "begged" or expat vote (Spanish: Voto rogado) which was abolished in 2022. Seats are elected using the D'Hondt method and a closed list proportional representation, with an electoral threshold of three percent of valid votes—which includes blank ballots—being applied in each constituency. The use of the D'Hondt method may result in a higher effective threshold, depending on the district magnitude.

The electoral law allows for parties and federations registered in the interior ministry, coalitions and groupings of electors to present lists of candidates. Parties and federations intending to form a coalition ahead of an election are required to inform the relevant Electoral Commission within ten days of the election call—fifteen before 1985—whereas groupings of electors need to secure the signature of at least one percent of the electorate in the constituencies for which they seek election—one-thousandth of the electorate, with a compulsory minimum of 500 signatures, until 1985—disallowing electors from signing for more than one list of candidates.

== Deputies ==
Deputies 1980–present
Key to parties CUP JxSí PSUC IC/ICV–EUiA CatSíqueesPot CatComú–Podem ECP Comuns Sumar ERC/ERC–CatSí PSC JxCat/Junts JuntsxCat Cs CiU CC–UCD PP CP AP Vox
| Parliament | Election | Distribution |
| 1st | 1980 | 3 / 2 / 4 / 5 / 4 |
| 2nd | 1984 | 1 / 5 / 10 / 2 |
| 3rd | 1988 | 1 / 1 / 5 / 10 / 1 |
| 4th | 1992 | 1 / 2 / 5 / 9 / 1 |
| 5th | 1995 | 1 / 2 / 4 / 9 / 2 |
| 6th | 1999 | 2 / 6 / 8 / 2 |
| 7th | 2003 | 1 / 3 / 5 / 7 / 2 |
| 8th | 2006 | 1 / 3 / 5 / 7 / 2 |
| 9th | 2010 | 1 / 1 / 4 / 9 / 3 |
| 10th | 2012 | 1 / 3 / 3 / 1 / 7 / 3 |
| 11th | 2015 | 1 / 9 / 1 / 2 / 4 / 1 |
| 12th | 2017 | 1 / 5 / 2 / 4 / 5 / 1 |
| 13/14th | 2021 | 1 / 1 / 5 / 4 / 4 / 1 / 2 |
| 15th | 2024 | 3 / 6 / 5 / 2 / 2 |

== Regional elections ==
=== 2024 ===
Summary of the 12 May 2024 Parliament of Catalonia election results in Tarragona
| Parties and alliances | Popular vote | | | Seats | |
| Parties and alliances | Votes | % | ±pp | Total | +/− |
|---|---|---|---|---|---|
| Socialists' Party of Catalonia (PSC–PSOE) | 81,701 | 25.49 | +5.45 | 6 | +2 |
| Together+Carles Puigdemont for Catalonia (Cat–Junts+) | 67,937 | 21.19 | +1.81 | 5 | +1 |
| Republican Left of Catalonia (ERC) | 51,330 | 16.01 | –8.47 | 3 | –2 |
| People's Party (PP) | 37,921 | 11.83 | +7.52 | 2 | +2 |
| Vox (Vox) | 32,642 | 10.18 | +0.79 | 2 | ±0 |
| Popular Unity Candidacy–Let's Defend the Land (CUP–DT) | 12,942 | 4.04 | –2.75 | 0 | –1 |
| Commons Unite (Comuns Sumar)^{1} | 12,381 | 3.86 | –1.06 | 0 | –1 |
| Catalan Alliance (Aliança.cat) | 11,206 | 3.50 | New | 0 | ±0 |
| Animalist Party with the Environment (PACMA) | 3,388 | 1.06 | New | 0 | ±0 |
| Citizens–Party of the Citizenry (Cs) | 1,747 | 0.55 | –4.69 | 0 | –1 |
| At the Same Time (Alhora)^{2} | 1,082 | 0.34 | +0.14 | 0 | ±0 |
| Workers' Front (FO) | 971 | 0.30 | New | 0 | ±0 |
| Communist Party of the Workers of Catalonia (PCTC) | 402 | 0.13 | –0.01 | 0 | ±0 |
| Convergents (CNV) | 263 | 0.08 | New | 0 | ±0 |
| Zero Cuts (Recortes Cero) | 257 | 0.08 | –0.22 | 0 | ±0 |
| For a Fairer World (PUM+J) | 234 | 0.07 | –0.13 | 0 | ±0 |
| Left for Spain (IZQP–Unidos–DEf)^{3} | 186 | 0.06 | –0.09 | 0 | ±0 |
| National Front of Catalonia (FNC) | 159 | 0.05 | –0.12 | 0 | ±0 |
| Blank ballots | 3,801 | 1.19 | +0.33 | | |
| Total | 320,550 | | | 18 | ±0 |
| Valid votes | 320,550 | 98.85 | +0.92 | | |
| Invalid votes | 3,740 | 1.15 | –0.92 | | |
| Votes cast / turnout | 324,290 | 53.72 | +4.86 | | |
| Abstentions | 279,401 | 46.28 | –4.86 | | |
| Registered voters | 603,691 | | | | |
Sources
Footnotes: ^{1} Commons Unite results are compared to In Common We Can–We Can In Common totals in the 2021 election.; ^{2} At the Same Time results are compared to Primaries for the Independence of Catalonia Movement totals in the 2021 election.; ^{3} Left for Spain results are compared to United for Democracy+Retirees totals in the 2021 election.

=== 2021 ===
Summary of the 14 February 2021 Parliament of Catalonia election results in Tarragona
| Parties and alliances | Popular vote | | | Seats | |
| Parties and alliances | Votes | % | ±pp | Total | +/− |
|---|---|---|---|---|---|
| Republican Left of Catalonia (ERC) | 68,095 | 24.48 | +0.75 | 5 | ±0 |
| Socialists' Party of Catalonia (PSC–PSOE) | 55,755 | 20.04 | +8.27 | 4 | +2 |
| Together for Catalonia (JxCat)^{1} | 53,917 | 19.38 | n/a | 4 | +2 |
| Vox (Vox) | 26,126 | 9.39 | New | 2 | +2 |
| Popular Unity Candidacy–A New Cycle to Win (CUP–G) | 18,896 | 6.79 | +2.79 | 1 | +1 |
| Citizens–Party of the Citizenry (Cs) | 14,566 | 5.24 | –22.11 | 1 | –4 |
| In Common We Can–We Can In Common (ECP–PEC)^{2} | 13,687 | 4.92 | –0.43 | 1 | ±0 |
| People's Party (PP) | 11,992 | 4.31 | –0.26 | 0 | –1 |
| Catalan European Democratic Party (PDeCAT)^{1} | 7,726 | 2.78 | n/a | 0 | –2 |
| We Are the Ebre Lands (Som Terres de l'Ebre) | 1,415 | 0.51 | New | 0 | ±0 |
| Zero Cuts–Green Group–Municipalists (Recortes Cero–GV–M) | 827 | 0.30 | +0.12 | 0 | ±0 |
| For a Fairer World (PUM+J) | 554 | 0.20 | New | 0 | ±0 |
| Primaries for the Independence of Catalonia Movement (MPIC) | 552 | 0.20 | New | 0 | ±0 |
| National Front of Catalonia (FNC) | 486 | 0.17 | New | 0 | ±0 |
| United for Democracy+Retirees (Unidos SI–DEf–PDSJE–Somos España) | 429 | 0.15 | New | 0 | ±0 |
| Communist Party of the Workers of Catalonia (PCTC) | 381 | 0.14 | New | 0 | ±0 |
| Nationalist Party of Catalonia (PNC) | 292 | 0.10 | New | 0 | ±0 |
| Red Current Movement (MCR) | 94 | 0.03 | New | 0 | ±0 |
| Blank ballots | 2,385 | 0.86 | +0.39 | | |
| Total | 278,175 | | | 18 | ±0 |
| Valid votes | 278,175 | 97.93 | –1.55 | | |
| Invalid votes | 5,893 | 2.07 | +1.55 | | |
| Votes cast / turnout | 284,068 | 48.86 | –29.55 | | |
| Abstentions | 297,378 | 51.14 | +29.55 | | |
| Registered voters | 581,446 | | | | |
Sources
Footnotes: ^{1} Within the Together for Catalonia alliance in the 2017 election.; ^{2} In Common We Can–We Can In Common results are compared to Catalonia in Common–We Can totals in the 2017 election.

=== 2017 ===
Summary of the 21 December 2017 Parliament of Catalonia election results in Tarragona
| Parties and alliances | Popular vote | | | Seats | |
| Parties and alliances | Votes | % | ±pp | Total | +/− |
|---|---|---|---|---|---|
| Citizens–Party of the Citizenry (Cs) | 120,825 | 27.35 | +7.94 | 5 | +1 |
| Republican Left–Catalonia Yes (ERC–CatSí)^{1} | 104,832 | 23.73 | n/a | 5 | +2 |
| Together for Catalonia (JuntsxCat)^{1} | 96,031 | 21.74 | n/a | 4 | ±0 |
| Socialists' Party of Catalonia (PSC–PSOE) | 52,017 | 11.77 | –0.06 | 2 | ±0 |
| Catalonia in Common–We Can (CatComú–Podem)^{2} | 23,653 | 5.35 | –1.12 | 1 | ±0 |
| People's Party (PP) | 20,188 | 4.57 | –4.35 | 1 | ±0 |
| Popular Unity Candidacy (CUP) | 17,687 | 4.00 | –3.39 | 0 | –1 |
| Animalist Party Against Mistreatment of Animals (PACMA) | 3,645 | 0.83 | +0.14 | 0 | ±0 |
| Zero Cuts–Green Group (Recortes Cero–GV) | 794 | 0.18 | –0.05 | 0 | ±0 |
| Republican Dialogue (Diàleg) | 0 | 0.00 | New | 0 | ±0 |
| Together for Yes (Independents) (JxSí)^{1} | n/a | n/a | n/a | 0 | –2 |
| Blank ballots | 2,094 | 0.47 | –0.16 | | |
| Total | 441,766 | | | 18 | ±0 |
| Valid votes | 441,766 | 99.48 | +0.06 | | |
| Invalid votes | 2,302 | 0.52 | –0.06 | | |
| Votes cast / turnout | 444,068 | 78.41 | +4.22 | | |
| Abstentions | 122,275 | 21.59 | –4.22 | | |
| Registered voters | 566,343 | | | | |
Sources
Footnotes: ^{1} Within the Junts pel Sí alliance in the 2015 election. Totals for JuntsxCat are compared to CDC. Totals for ERC–CatSí include DC and MES. Also including JuntsxCat and ERC aligned independents from 2015.; ^{2} Catalonia in Common–We Can results are compared to Catalonia Yes We Can totals in the 2015 election.

=== 2015 ===
Summary of the 27 September 2015 Parliament of Catalonia election results in Tarragona
| Parties and alliances | Popular vote | | | Seats | |
| Parties and alliances | Votes | % | ±pp | Total | +/− |
|---|---|---|---|---|---|
| Together for Yes (JxSí)^{1} | 172,537 | 41.63 | –5.22 | 9 | –1 |
| Citizens–Party of the Citizenry (C's) | 80,374 | 19.39 | +12.39 | 4 | +3 |
| Socialists' Party of Catalonia (PSC–PSOE) | 49,016 | 11.83 | –1.75 | 2 | –1 |
| People's Party (PP) | 36,968 | 8.92 | –6.04 | 1 | –2 |
| Popular Unity Candidacy (CUP) | 30,613 | 7.39 | +3.80 | 1 | +1 |
| Catalonia Yes We Can (CatSíqueesPot)^{2} | 26,808 | 6.47 | –0.38 | 1 | ±0 |
| Democratic Union of Catalonia (unio.cat) | 11,120 | 2.68 | New | 0 | ±0 |
| Animalist Party Against Mistreatment of Animals (PACMA) | 2,862 | 0.69 | +0.11 | 0 | ±0 |
| Zero Cuts–The Greens (Recortes Cero–EV) | 965 | 0.23 | New | 0 | ±0 |
| Let's Win Catalonia (Ganemos) | 626 | 0.15 | New | 0 | ±0 |
| Blank ballots | 2,611 | 0.63 | –1.16 | | |
| Total | 414,500 | | | 18 | ±0 |
| Valid votes | 414,500 | 99.42 | +0.71 | | |
| Invalid votes | 2,417 | 0.58 | –0.71 | | |
| Votes cast / turnout | 416,917 | 74.19 | +9.02 | | |
| Abstentions | 145,018 | 25.81 | –9.02 | | |
| Registered voters | 561,935 | | | | |
Sources
Footnotes: ^{1} Junts pel Sí results are compared to the combined totals of Convergence and Union and Republican Left of Catalonia in the 2012 election.; ^{2} Catalonia Yes We Can results are compared to Initiative for Catalonia Greens–United and Alternative Left totals in the 2012 election.

=== 2012 ===
Summary of the 25 November 2012 Parliament of Catalonia election results in Tarragona
| Parties and alliances | Popular vote | | | Seats | |
| Parties and alliances | Votes | % | ±pp | Total | +/− |
|---|---|---|---|---|---|
| Convergence and Union (CiU) | 113,657 | 31.74 | –7.58 | 7 | –2 |
| Republican Left of Catalonia–Catalonia Yes (ERC–CatSí) | 54,093 | 15.11 | +6.60 | 3 | +2 |
| People's Party (PP) | 53,591 | 14.96 | +1.59 | 3 | ±0 |
| Socialists' Party of Catalonia (PSC–PSOE) | 48,642 | 13.58 | –4.65 | 3 | –1 |
| Citizens–Party of the Citizenry (C's) | 26,039 | 7.27 | +4.54 | 1 | +1 |
| Initiative for Catalonia Greens–United and Alternative Left (ICV–EUiA) | 24,538 | 6.85 | +1.77 | 1 | ±0 |
| Popular Unity Candidacy–Left Alternative (CUP) | 12,840 | 3.59 | New | 0 | ±0 |
| Catalan Solidarity for Independence (SI) | 5,493 | 1.53 | –1.88 | 0 | ±0 |
| Platform for Catalonia (PxC) | 4,103 | 1.15 | –1.44 | 0 | ±0 |
| Blank Seats (EB) | 2,108 | 0.59 | +0.18 | 0 | ±0 |
| Animalist Party Against Mistreatment of Animals (PACMA) | 2,065 | 0.58 | +0.25 | 0 | ±0 |
| Union, Progress and Democracy (UPyD) | 1,373 | 0.38 | +0.23 | 0 | ±0 |
| Hartos.org (Hartos.org) | 1,323 | 0.37 | New | 0 | ±0 |
| Pirates of Catalonia (Pirata.cat) | 1,199 | 0.33 | +0.16 | 0 | ±0 |
| Socialists and Republicans (SyR) | 333 | 0.09 | New | 0 | ±0 |
| Communist Unification of Spain (UCE) | 287 | 0.08 | +0.05 | 0 | ±0 |
| Blank ballots | 6,427 | 1.79 | –0.92 | | |
| Total | 358,111 | | | 18 | ±0 |
| Valid votes | 358,111 | 98.71 | –0.32 | | |
| Invalid votes | 4,681 | 1.29 | +0.32 | | |
| Votes cast / turnout | 362,792 | 65.17 | +8.38 | | |
| Abstentions | 193,910 | 34.83 | –8.38 | | |
| Registered voters | 556,702 | | | | |

=== 2010 ===
Summary of the 28 November 2010 Parliament of Catalonia election results in Tarragona
| Parties and alliances | Popular vote | | | Seats | |
| Parties and alliances | Votes | % | ±pp | Total | +/− |
|---|---|---|---|---|---|
| Convergence and Union (CiU) | 121,836 | 39.32 | +6.89 | 9 | +2 |
| Socialists' Party of Catalonia (PSC–PSOE) | 56,481 | 18.23 | –7.75 | 4 | –1 |
| People's Party (PP) | 41,418 | 13.37 | +2.37 | 3 | +1 |
| Republican Left of Catalonia (ERC) | 26,355 | 8.51 | –9.11 | 1 | –2 |
| Initiative for Catalonia Greens–United and Alternative Left (ICV–EUiA) | 15,747 | 5.08 | –1.43 | 1 | ±0 |
| Catalan Solidarity for Independence (SI) | 10,581 | 3.41 | New | 0 | ±0 |
| Citizens–Party of the Citizenry (C's) | 8,453 | 2.73 | +0.31 | 0 | ±0 |
| Platform for Catalonia (PxC) | 8,017 | 2.59 | New | 0 | ±0 |
| Independence Rally (RI.cat) | 2,887 | 0.93 | New | 0 | ±0 |
| Reus Independent Coordinator (CORI) | 2,040 | 0.66 | New | 0 | ±0 |
| The Greens–European Green Group (EV–GVE) | 1,501 | 0.48 | New | 0 | ±0 |
| Blank Seats–Citizens for Blank Votes (EB–CenB)^{1} | 1,264 | 0.41 | +0.28 | 0 | ±0 |
| Anti-Bullfighting Party Against Mistreatment of Animals (PACMA) | 1,022 | 0.33 | –0.04 | 0 | ±0 |
| Pirates of Catalonia (Pirata.cat) | 523 | 0.17 | New | 0 | ±0 |
| Union, Progress and Democracy (UPyD) | 452 | 0.15 | New | 0 | ±0 |
| From Below (Des de Baix) | 371 | 0.12 | New | 0 | ±0 |
| Pensioners in Action Party (PDLPEA) | 335 | 0.11 | New | 0 | ±0 |
| Internationalist Socialist Workers' Party (POSI) | 284 | 0.09 | –0.15 | 0 | ±0 |
| Communist Party of the Catalan People (PCPC) | 282 | 0.09 | –0.13 | 0 | ±0 |
| Spanish Phalanx of the CNSO (FE de las JONS) | 249 | 0.08 | New | 0 | ±0 |
| Left Republican Party–Republican Left (PRE–IR) | 244 | 0.08 | –0.03 | 0 | ±0 |
| Family and Life Party (PFiV) | 227 | 0.07 | –0.04 | 0 | ±0 |
| For a Fairer World (PUM+J) | 204 | 0.07 | +0.06 | 0 | ±0 |
| We Are All Equal (GLBTH/TSI) | 186 | 0.06 | New | 0 | ±0 |
| Democratic and Social Centre (CDS) | 161 | 0.05 | New | 0 | ±0 |
| Communist Unification of Spain (UCE) | 85 | 0.03 | New | 0 | ±0 |
| Internationalist Solidarity and Self-Management (SAIn) | 82 | 0.03 | New | 0 | ±0 |
| Republican Social Movement (MSR) | 67 | 0.02 | –0.03 | 0 | ±0 |
| Social and Liberal Alternative (ALS) | 54 | 0.02 | New | 0 | ±0 |
| Democratic Web (DW) | 46 | 0.01 | New | 0 | ±0 |
| Blank ballots | 8,386 | 2.68 | +0.95 | | |
| Total | 309,840 | | | 18 | ±0 |
| Valid votes | 309,840 | 99.03 | –0.32 | | |
| Invalid votes | 3,042 | 0.97 | +0.32 | | |
| Votes cast / turnout | 312,882 | 56.79 | +2.66 | | |
| Abstentions | 238,029 | 43.21 | –2.66 | | |
| Registered voters | 550,911 | | | | |
Sources
Footnotes: ^{1} Blank Seats–Citizens for Blank Votes results are compared to Unsubmissive Seats–Alternative of Discontented Democrats totals in the 2006 election.

=== 2006 ===
Summary of the 1 November 2006 Parliament of Catalonia election results in Tarragona
| Parties and alliances | Popular vote | | | Seats | |
| Parties and alliances | Votes | % | ±pp | Total | +/− |
|---|---|---|---|---|---|
| Convergence and Union (CiU) | 93,277 | 32.43 | –1.33 | 7 | ±0 |
| Socialists' Party of Catalonia–Citizens for Change (PSC–CpC) | 74,720 | 25.98 | –2.24 | 5 | ±0 |
| Republican Left of Catalonia (ERC) | 50,686 | 17.62 | –1.41 | 3 | ±0 |
| People's Party (PP) | 31,644 | 11.00 | –0.78 | 2 | ±0 |
| Initiative for Catalonia Greens–United and Alternative Left (ICV–EUiA) | 18,729 | 6.51 | +1.31 | 1 | ±0 |
| Citizens–Party of the Citizenry (C's) | 6,970 | 2.42 | New | 0 | ±0 |
| The Greens–Green Alternative (EV–AV) | 1,391 | 0.48 | New | 0 | ±0 |
| Anti-Bullfighting Party Against Mistreatment of Animals (PACMA) | 1,075 | 0.37 | New | 0 | ±0 |
| Catalan Republican Party (RC) | 828 | 0.29 | New | 0 | ±0 |
| Internationalist Socialist Workers' Party (POSI) | 702 | 0.24 | +0.07 | 0 | ±0 |
| Communist Party of the Catalan People–We Are (PCPC–NSom) | 640 | 0.22 | +0.13 | 0 | ±0 |
| For a Fairer World (PUM+J) | 380 | 0.13 | New | 0 | ±0 |
| Unsubmissive Seats–Alternative of Discontented Democrats (Ei–ADD) | 370 | 0.13 | +0.03 | 0 | ±0 |
| Family and Life Party (PFiV) | 308 | 0.11 | New | 0 | ±0 |
| Republican Left–Left Republican Party (IR–PRE) | 302 | 0.11 | –0.07 | 0 | ±0 |
| Forward Catalonia Platform (AES–DN) | 244 | 0.08 | New | 0 | ±0 |
| Humanist Party of Catalonia (PHC) | 182 | 0.06 | ±0.00 | 0 | ±0 |
| Republican Social Movement (MSR) | 131 | 0.05 | +0.01 | 0 | ±0 |
| Blank ballots | 5,004 | 1.74 | +0.75 | | |
| Total | 287,583 | | | 18 | ±0 |
| Valid votes | 287,583 | 99.35 | –0.23 | | |
| Invalid votes | 1,895 | 0.65 | +0.23 | | |
| Votes cast / turnout | 289,478 | 54.13 | –7.54 | | |
| Abstentions | 245,312 | 45.87 | +7.54 | | |
| Registered voters | 534,790 | | | | |

=== 2003 ===
Summary of the 16 November 2003 Parliament of Catalonia election results in Tarragona
| Parties and alliances | Popular vote | | | Seats | |
| Parties and alliances | Votes | % | ±pp | Total | +/− |
|---|---|---|---|---|---|
| Convergence and Union (CiU) | 106,589 | 33.76 | –7.54 | 7 | –1 |
| Socialists' Party of Catalonia–Citizens for Change (PSC–CpC)^{1} | 89,109 | 28.22 | –5.89 | 5 | –1 |
| Republican Left of Catalonia (ERC) | 60,092 | 19.03 | +8.53 | 3 | +1 |
| People's Party (PP) | 37,183 | 11.78 | +1.15 | 2 | ±0 |
| Initiative for Catalonia Greens–Alternative Left (ICV–EA)^{2} | 16,419 | 5.20 | +4.42 | 1 | +1 |
| Platform for Catalonia (PxC) | 831 | 0.26 | New | 0 | ±0 |
| Republican Left–Left Republican Party (IR–PRE) | 566 | 0.18 | New | 0 | ±0 |
| Internationalist Socialist Workers' Party (POSI) | 540 | 0.17 | New | 0 | ±0 |
| Unsubmissive Seats (Ei) | 315 | 0.10 | New | 0 | ±0 |
| Communist Party of the Catalan People (PCPC) | 271 | 0.09 | New | 0 | ±0 |
| Catalan State (EC) | 217 | 0.07 | –0.02 | 0 | ±0 |
| Humanist Party of Catalonia (PHC) | 184 | 0.06 | +0.02 | 0 | ±0 |
| Republican Social Movement (MSR) | 142 | 0.04 | New | 0 | ±0 |
| Caló Nationalist Party (PNCA) | 97 | 0.03 | New | 0 | ±0 |
| Internationalist Struggle (LI (LIT–CI)) | 68 | 0.02 | New | 0 | ±0 |
| Blank ballots | 3,116 | 0.99 | +0.05 | | |
| Total | 315,739 | | | 18 | ±0 |
| Valid votes | 315,739 | 99.58 | –0.08 | | |
| Invalid votes | 1,320 | 0.42 | +0.08 | | |
| Votes cast / turnout | 317,059 | 61.67 | +3.35 | | |
| Abstentions | 197,044 | 38.33 | –3.35 | | |
| Registered voters | 514,103 | | | | |
Sources
Footnotes: ^{1} Socialists' Party of Catalonia–Citizens for Change are compared to Socialists' Party–Citizens for Change–Initiative–Greens totals in the 1999 election.; ^{2} Initiative for Catalonia Greens–Alternative Left results are compared to United and Alternative Left totals in the 1999 election.

=== 1999 ===
Summary of the 17 October 1999 Parliament of Catalonia election results in Tarragona
| Parties and alliances | Popular vote | | | Seats | |
| Parties and alliances | Votes | % | ±pp | Total | +/− |
|---|---|---|---|---|---|
| Convergence and Union (CiU) | 116,974 | 41.30 | –1.90 | 8 | –1 |
| Socialists' Party–Citizens for Change–Initiative–Greens (PSC–CpC–IC–V)^{1} | 96,632 | 34.11 | +4.46 | 6 | +1 |
| People's Party (PP) | 30,108 | 10.63 | –3.72 | 2 | ±0 |
| Republican Left of Catalonia (ERC) | 29,733 | 10.50 | –0.55 | 2 | ±0 |
| United and Alternative Left (EUiA)^{2} | 2,198 | 0.78 | n/a | 0 | ±0 |
| The Greens–Ecologist Confederation of Catalonia (EV–CEC)^{2} | 1,806 | 0.64 | n/a | 0 | ±0 |
| The Greens–Green Alternative (EV–AV) | 1,223 | 0.43 | New | 0 | ±0 |
| UNIC–Federation of Independents of Catalonia (UNIC–FIC) | 881 | 0.31 | New | 0 | ±0 |
| Bounced Public Workers (TPR) | 323 | 0.11 | New | 0 | ±0 |
| Catalan State (EC) | 244 | 0.09 | New | 0 | ±0 |
| Natural Law Party (PLN) | 135 | 0.05 | New | 0 | ±0 |
| Espinalist Party (PE) | 122 | 0.04 | New | 0 | ±0 |
| Humanist Party of Catalonia (PHC) | 121 | 0.04 | New | 0 | ±0 |
| Democratic Party of the People (PDEP) | 108 | 0.04 | –0.01 | 0 | ±0 |
| Blank ballots | 2,652 | 0.94 | –0.01 | | |
| Total | 283,260 | | | 18 | ±0 |
| Valid votes | 283,260 | 99.66 | +0.11 | | |
| Invalid votes | 961 | 0.34 | –0.11 | | |
| Votes cast / turnout | 284,221 | 58.32 | –5.93 | | |
| Abstentions | 203,142 | 41.68 | +5.93 | | |
| Registered voters | 487,363 | | | | |
Sources
Footnotes: ^{1} Socialists' Party–Citizens for Change–Initiative–Greens results are compared to the combined totals of the Socialists' Party of Catalonia and Initiative for Catalonia–The Greens in the 1995 election.; ^{2} Within the Initiative for Catalonia–The Greens alliance in the 1995 election.

=== 1995 ===
Summary of the 19 November 1995 Parliament of Catalonia election results in Tarragona
| Parties and alliances | Popular vote | | | Seats | |
| Parties and alliances | Votes | % | ±pp | Total | +/− |
|---|---|---|---|---|---|
| Convergence and Union (CiU) | 127,645 | 43.20 | –2.58 | 9 | ±0 |
| Socialists' Party of Catalonia (PSC–PSOE) | 68,576 | 23.21 | –3.29 | 4 | –1 |
| People's Party (PP) | 42,398 | 14.35 | +6.67 | 2 | +1 |
| Republican Left of Catalonia (ERC) | 32,661 | 11.05 | +1.87 | 2 | ±0 |
| Initiative for Catalonia–The Greens (IC–EV)^{1} | 19,042 | 6.44 | –0.02 | 1 | ±0 |
| Ecologist Alternative of Catalonia (AEC) | 1,375 | 0.47 | New | 0 | ±0 |
| Revolutionary Workers' Party (POR) | 325 | 0.11 | +0.01 | 0 | ±0 |
| Party of Self-employed of Spain (PAE) | 194 | 0.07 | New | 0 | ±0 |
| Spanish Phalanx of the CNSO (FE–JONS) | 190 | 0.06 | New | 0 | ±0 |
| Democratic Party of the People (PDEP) | 134 | 0.05 | New | 0 | ±0 |
| Civic Platform–New Socialist Party (PC–NPS)^{2} | 119 | 0.04 | –0.06 | 0 | ±0 |
| Blank ballots | 2,808 | 0.95 | –0.35 | | |
| Total | 295,467 | | | 18 | ±0 |
| Valid votes | 295,467 | 99.55 | +0.36 | | |
| Invalid votes | 1,330 | 0.45 | –0.36 | | |
| Votes cast / turnout | 296,797 | 64.25 | +6.40 | | |
| Abstentions | 165,138 | 35.75 | –6.40 | | |
| Registered voters | 461,935 | | | | |
Sources
Footnotes: ^{1} Initiative for Catalonia–The Greens results are compared to the combined totals of Initiative for Catalonia, Green Alternative and Party of the Communists of Catalonia in the 1992 election.; ^{2} Civic Platform–New Socialist Party results are compared to Independent Socialists totals in the 1992 election.

=== 1992 ===
Summary of the 15 March 1992 Parliament of Catalonia election results in Tarragona
| Parties and alliances | Popular vote | | | Seats | |
| Parties and alliances | Votes | % | ±pp | Total | +/− |
|---|---|---|---|---|---|
| Convergence and Union (CiU) | 111,644 | 45.78 | –1.79 | 9 | –1 |
| Socialists' Party of Catalonia (PSC–PSOE) | 64,639 | 26.50 | –0.46 | 5 | ±0 |
| Republican Left of Catalonia (ERC) | 22,382 | 9.18 | +3.92 | 2 | +1 |
| People's Party (PP)^{1} | 18,722 | 7.68 | +0.62 | 1 | ±0 |
| Initiative for Catalonia (IC) | 11,578 | 4.75 | –0.73 | 1 | ±0 |
| Ruiz-Mateos Group (ARM) | 3,515 | 1.44 | New | 0 | ±0 |
| Green Alternative (AV) | 2,800 | 1.15 | +0.61 | 0 | ±0 |
| Democratic and Social Centre (CDS) | 1,890 | 0.77 | –3.27 | 0 | ±0 |
| Party of the Communists of Catalonia (PCC) | 1,377 | 0.56 | New | 0 | ±0 |
| Free Catalonia (CLL) | 799 | 0.33 | New | 0 | ±0 |
| Workers' Socialist Party (PST) | 722 | 0.30 | +0.06 | 0 | ±0 |
| Revolutionary Workers' Party of Spain (PORE) | 235 | 0.10 | –0.03 | 0 | ±0 |
| Independent Socialists (SI)^{2} | 234 | 0.10 | +0.04 | 0 | ±0 |
| Humanist Party (PH) | 184 | 0.08 | +0.03 | 0 | ±0 |
| Blank ballots | 3,176 | 1.30 | +0.57 | | |
| Total | 243,897 | | | 18 | ±0 |
| Valid votes | 243,897 | 99.19 | –0.18 | | |
| Invalid votes | 1,999 | 0.81 | +0.18 | | |
| Votes cast / turnout | 245,896 | 57.85 | –1.34 | | |
| Abstentions | 179,145 | 42.15 | +1.34 | | |
| Registered voters | 425,041 | | | | |
Sources
Footnotes: ^{1} People's Party results are compared to People's Alliance totals in the 1988 election.; ^{2} Independent Socialists results are compared to Alliance for the Republic totals in the 1988 election.

=== 1988 ===
Summary of the 29 May 1988 Parliament of Catalonia election results in Tarragona
| Parties and alliances | Popular vote | | | Seats | |
| Parties and alliances | Votes | % | ±pp | Total | +/− |
|---|---|---|---|---|---|
| Convergence and Union (CiU) | 111,867 | 47.57 | –0.58 | 10 | ±0 |
| Socialists' Party of Catalonia (PSC–PSOE) | 63,384 | 26.96 | +0.28 | 5 | ±0 |
| People's Alliance (AP)^{1} | 16,596 | 7.06 | –3.19 | 1 | –1 |
| Initiative for Catalonia (IC)^{2} | 12,896 | 5.48 | –3.06 | 1 | ±0 |
| Republican Left of Catalonia (ERC) | 12,359 | 5.26 | +0.64 | 1 | +1 |
| Democratic and Social Centre (CDS) | 9,508 | 4.04 | New | 0 | ±0 |
| Green Alternative–Ecologist Movement of Catalonia (AV–MEC) | 1,264 | 0.54 | New | 0 | ±0 |
| Ecologist Party of Catalonia–VERDE (PEC–VERDE) | 910 | 0.39 | New | 0 | ±0 |
| The Greens (EV) | 729 | 0.31 | New | 0 | ±0 |
| Social Democratic Party of Catalonia (PSDC) | 699 | 0.30 | +0.05 | 0 | ±0 |
| The Ecologist Greens (EVE) | 693 | 0.29 | New | 0 | ±0 |
| Workers' Socialist Party (PST) | 576 | 0.24 | +0.04 | 0 | ±0 |
| Spanish Juntas (JJEE) | 439 | 0.19 | New | 0 | ±0 |
| Communist Unification of Spain (UCE) | 316 | 0.13 | New | 0 | ±0 |
| Revolutionary Workers' Party of Spain (PORE) | 296 | 0.13 | –0.02 | 0 | ±0 |
| Andalusian Party of Catalonia (PAC) | 290 | 0.12 | New | 0 | ±0 |
| Communist Workers' League (LOC) | 244 | 0.10 | New | 0 | ±0 |
| Alliance for the Republic (AxR)^{3} | 132 | 0.06 | –0.10 | 0 | ±0 |
| Humanist Party of Catalonia (PHC) | 122 | 0.05 | New | 0 | ±0 |
| Centrist Unity–Democratic Spanish Party (PED) | 108 | 0.05 | New | 0 | ±0 |
| Blank ballots | 1,715 | 0.73 | +0.15 | | |
| Total | 235,143 | | | 18 | ±0 |
| Valid votes | 235,143 | 99.37 | +0.14 | | |
| Invalid votes | 1,498 | 0.63 | –0.14 | | |
| Votes cast / turnout | 236,641 | 59.19 | –4.45 | | |
| Abstentions | 163,150 | 40.81 | +4.45 | | |
| Registered voters | 399,791 | | | | |
Sources
Footnotes: ^{1} People's Alliance results are compared to People's Coalition totals in the 1984 election.; ^{2} Initiative for Catalonia results are compared to the combined totals of Unified Socialist Party of Catalonia, Agreement of the Catalan Left and Party of the Communists of Catalonia in the 1984 election.; ^{3} Alliance for the Republic results are compared to Internationalist Socialist Workers' Party totals in the 1984 election.

=== 1984 ===
Summary of the 29 April 1984 Parliament of Catalonia election results in Tarragona
| Parties and alliances | Popular vote | | | Seats | |
| Parties and alliances | Votes | % | ±pp | Total | +/− |
|---|---|---|---|---|---|
| Convergence and Union (CiU) | 118,106 | 48.15 | +24.57 | 10 | +5 |
| Socialists' Party of Catalonia (PSC–PSOE) | 65,439 | 26.68 | +6.13 | 5 | +1 |
| People's Coalition (AP–PDP–UL)^{1} | 25,138 | 10.25 | +7.23 | 2 | +2 |
| Unified Socialist Party of Catalonia (PSUC) | 13,029 | 5.31 | –9.76 | 1 | –2 |
| Republican Left of Catalonia (ERC) | 11,342 | 4.62 | –5.81 | 0 | –2 |
| Agreement of the Catalan Left (EEC)^{2} | 4,461 | 1.82 | –0.05 | 0 | ±0 |
| Party of the Communists of Catalonia (PCC)^{3} | 3,458 | 1.41 | +1.07 | 0 | ±0 |
| Social Democratic Party of Catalonia (PSDC) | 620 | 0.25 | New | 0 | ±0 |
| Workers' Socialist Party (PST) | 502 | 0.20 | New | 0 | ±0 |
| Communist Workers' Party of Catalonia (PCOC) | 462 | 0.19 | New | 0 | ±0 |
| Internationalist Socialist Workers' Party (POSI) | 389 | 0.16 | New | 0 | ±0 |
| Revolutionary Workers' Party of Spain (PORE) | 380 | 0.15 | New | 0 | ±0 |
| Communist Party of Spain (Marxist–Leninist) (PCE (m–l)) | 203 | 0.08 | New | 0 | ±0 |
| Revolutionary Communist League (LCR) | 198 | 0.08 | New | 0 | ±0 |
| Communist Movement of Catalonia (MCC)^{4} | 164 | 0.07 | –0.94 | 0 | ±0 |
| Centrists of Catalonia (CC–UCD) | n/a | n/a | –19.67 | 0 | –4 |
| Blank ballots | 1,419 | 0.58 | –0.03 | | |
| Total | 245,310 | | | 18 | ±0 |
| Valid votes | 245,310 | 99.23 | –0.14 | | |
| Invalid votes | 1,913 | 0.77 | +0.14 | | |
| Votes cast / turnout | 247,223 | 63.64 | +4.43 | | |
| Abstentions | 141,262 | 36.36 | –4.43 | | |
| Registered voters | 388,485 | | | | |
Sources
Footnotes: ^{1} People's Coalition results are compared to Catalan Solidarity totals in the 1980 election.; ^{2} Agreement of the Catalan Left results are compared to Left Nationalists totals in the 1980 election.; ^{3} Party of the Communists of Catalonia results are compared to Communist Unity totals in the 1980 election.; ^{4} Communist Movement of Catalonia results are compared to Unity for Socialism totals in the 1980 election.

=== 1980 ===
Summary of the 20 March 1980 Parliament of Catalonia election results in Tarragona
| Parties and alliances | Popular vote | | | Seats | |
| Parties and alliances | Votes | % | ±pp | Total | +/− |
|---|---|---|---|---|---|
| Convergence and Union (CiU) | 52,660 | 23.58 | n/a | 5 | n/a |
| Socialists' Party of Catalonia (PSC–PSOE) | 45,890 | 20.55 | n/a | 4 | n/a |
| Centrists of Catalonia (CC–UCD) | 43,913 | 19.67 | n/a | 4 | n/a |
| Unified Socialist Party of Catalonia (PSUC) | 33,645 | 15.07 | n/a | 3 | n/a |
| Republican Left of Catalonia (ERC) | 23,290 | 10.43 | n/a | 2 | n/a |
| Catalan Solidarity (SC) | 6,749 | 3.02 | n/a | 0 | n/a |
| Socialist Party of Andalusia–Andalusian Party (PSA–PA) | 4,345 | 1.95 | n/a | 0 | n/a |
| Left Nationalists (NE) | 4,167 | 1.87 | n/a | 0 | n/a |
| New Force (FN) | 3,335 | 1.49 | n/a | 0 | n/a |
| Unity for Socialism (CUPS) | 2,255 | 1.01 | n/a | 0 | n/a |
| Left Bloc for National Liberation (BEAN) | 915 | 0.41 | n/a | 0 | n/a |
| Communist Unity (UC) | 751 | 0.34 | n/a | 0 | n/a |
| Blank ballots | 1,369 | 0.61 | n/a | | |
| Total | 223,284 | | | 18 | n/a |
| Valid votes | 223,284 | 99.37 | n/a | | |
| Invalid votes | 1,418 | 0.63 | n/a | | |
| Votes cast / turnout | 224,702 | 59.21 | n/a | | |
| Abstentions | 154,806 | 40.79 | n/a | | |
| Registered voters | 379,508 | | | | |
