= Girona (Parliament of Catalonia constituency) =

Coordinates: 42°10′N 2°40′W

- Parliament of Catalonia; Electoral constituency
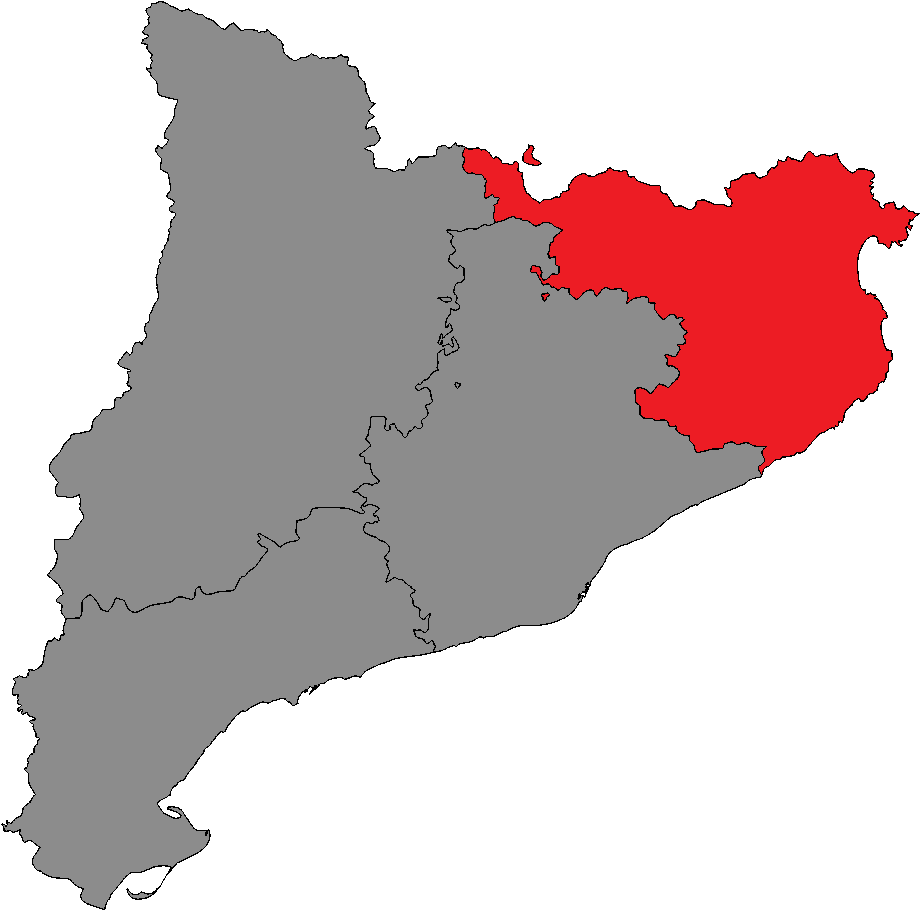
- Location of Girona within Catalonia
- Province: Girona
- Autonomous community: Catalonia
- Population: ▲822,952 (2024)
- Electorate: ▲553,338 (2024)
- Major settlements: Girona

Current constituency
- Created: 1980
- Seats: 17
- Members: Cat–Junts+ (7); PSC (4); ERC (2); Aliança.cat (1); PP (1); Vox (1); CUP (1)

Girona (Spanish: Gerona) is one of the four constituencies (Spanish: circunscripciones) represented in the Parliament of Catalonia, the regional legislature of the autonomous community of Catalonia. The constituency currently elects 17 deputies. Its boundaries correspond to those of the Spanish province of Girona. The electoral system uses the D'Hondt method and closed-list proportional representation, with a minimum threshold of three percent.

== Electoral system ==
The constituency was created as per the Statute of Autonomy of Catalonia of 1979 and was first contested in the 1980 regional election. The Statute requires for an electoral law to be passed by a two-thirds supermajority in the Parliament of Catalonia, but transitory provisions provide for the four provinces in Catalonia—Barcelona, Girona, Lleida and Tarragona—to be established as multi-member districts in the Parliament. Each constituency is allocated a fixed number of seats: 85 for Barcelona, 17 for Girona, 15 for Lleida and 18 for Tarragona.

Voting is on the basis of universal suffrage, which comprises all nationals over eighteen, registered in Catalonia and in full enjoyment of their political rights. Amendments to the electoral law in 2011 required for Catalans abroad to apply for voting before being permitted to vote, a system known as "begged" or expat vote (Spanish: Voto rogado) which was abolished in 2022. Seats are elected using the D'Hondt method and a closed list proportional representation, with an electoral threshold of three percent of valid votes—which includes blank ballots—being applied in each constituency. The use of the D'Hondt method may result in a higher effective threshold, depending on the district magnitude.

The electoral law allows for parties and federations registered in the interior ministry, coalitions and groupings of electors to present lists of candidates. Parties and federations intending to form a coalition ahead of an election are required to inform the relevant Electoral Commission within ten days of the election call—fifteen before 1985—whereas groupings of electors need to secure the signature of at least one percent of the electorate in the constituencies for which they seek election—one-thousandth of the electorate, with a compulsory minimum of 500 signatures, until 1985—disallowing electors from signing for more than one list of candidates.

== Deputies ==
Deputies 1980–present
Key to parties CUP JxSí PSUC ICV–EUiA CatSíqueesPot ERC/ERC–CatSí PSC JxCat/Junts JuntsxCat Cs SI CiU CC–UCD PP CP AP Aliança.cat Vox
Parliament	Election	Distribution
1st	1980	1 / 2 / 4 / 7 / 3
2nd	1984	1 / 4 / 11 / 1
3rd	1988	1 / 5 / 11
4th	1992	2 / 4 / 11
5th	1995	2 / 5 / 9 / 1
6th	1999	2 / 5 / 9 / 1
7th	2003	1 / 4 / 4 / 7 / 1
8th	2006	1 / 4 / 4 / 7 / 1
9th	2010	1 / 2 / 3 / 1 / 9 / 1
10th	2012	1 / 3 / 2 / 9 / 2
11th	2015	1 / 11 / 1 / 1 / 2 / 1
12th	2017	1 / 4 / 1 / 7 / 4
13/14th	2021	2 / 4 / 3 / 7 / 1
15th	2024	1 / 2 / 4 / 7 / 1 / 1 / 1

== Regional elections ==
=== 2024 ===
Summary of the 12 May 2024 Parliament of Catalonia election results in Girona
Parties and alliances	Popular vote			Seats	
Parties and alliances	Votes	%	±pp	Total	+/−
Together+Carles Puigdemont for Catalonia (Cat–Junts+)	104,664	34.80	+2.13	7	±0
Socialists' Party of Catalonia (PSC–PSOE)	58,906	19.59	+4.41	4	+1
Republican Left of Catalonia (ERC)	36,063	11.99	–9.82	2	–2
Catalan Alliance (Aliança.cat)	26,989	8.97	New	1	+1
People's Party (PP)	19,723	6.56	+4.56	1	+1
Vox (Vox)	19,118	6.36	+0.21	1	±0
Popular Unity Candidacy–Let's Defend the Land (CUP–DT)	14,846	4.94	–4.09	1	–1
Commons Unite (Comuns Sumar)^{1}	9,920	3.30	–0.75	0	±0
Animalist Party with the Environment (PACMA)	3,038	1.01	New	0	±0
At the Same Time (Alhora)^{2}	1,565	0.52	+0.28	0	±0
Citizens–Party of the Citizenry (Cs)	1,014	0.34	–2.92	0	±0
Workers' Front (FO)	564	0.19	New	0	±0
Communist Party of the Workers of Catalonia (PCTC)	334	0.11	–0.02	0	±0
For a Fairer World (PUM+J)	227	0.08	–0.10	0	±0
Zero Cuts (Recortes Cero)	193	0.06	–0.16	0	±0
Blank ballots	3,559	1.18	+0.25		
Total	300,723			17	±0
Valid votes	300,723	98.95	+0.68		
Invalid votes	3,179	1.05	–0.68		
Votes cast / turnout	303,902	54.92	+2.17		
Abstentions	249,436	45.08	–2.17		
Registered voters	553,338				
Sources
Footnotes: ^{1} Commons Unite results are compared to In Common We Can–We Can In Common totals in the 2021 election.; ^{2} At the Same Time results are compared to Primaries for the Independence of Catalonia Movement totals in the 2021 election.

=== 2021 ===
Summary of the 14 February 2021 Parliament of Catalonia election results in Girona
Parties and alliances	Popular vote			Seats	
Parties and alliances	Votes	%	±pp	Total	+/−
Together for Catalonia (JxCat)^{1}	90,052	32.67	n/a	7	+4
Republican Left of Catalonia (ERC)	60,131	21.81	+0.10	4	±0
Socialists' Party of Catalonia (PSC–PSOE)	41,845	15.18	+6.56	3	+2
Popular Unity Candidacy–A New Cycle to Win (CUP–G)	24,892	9.03	+3.71	2	+1
Vox (Vox)	16,953	6.15	New	1	+1
In Common We Can–We Can In Common (ECP–PEC)^{2}	11,165	4.05	+0.01	0	±0
Citizens–Party of the Citizenry (Cs)	8,976	3.26	–16.25	0	–4
Catalan European Democratic Party (PDeCAT)^{1}	8,760	3.18	n/a	0	–4
People's Party (PP)	5,500	2.00	–0.85	0	±0
Nationalist Party of Catalonia (PNC)	889	0.32	New	0	±0
National Front of Catalonia (FNC)	882	0.32	New	0	±0
Primaries for the Independence of Catalonia Movement (MPIC)	672	0.24	New	0	±0
European Union of Pensioners (UEP)	635	0.23	New	0	±0
Zero Cuts–Green Group–Municipalists (Recortes Cero–GV–M)	619	0.22	+0.08	0	±0
For a Fairer World (PUM+J)	483	0.18	New	0	±0
Communist Party of the Workers of Catalonia (PCTC)	363	0.13	New	0	±0
Alliance for Commerce and Housing (Alianza CV)	173	0.06	New	0	±0
Left in Positive (IZQP)	110	0.04	New	0	±0
Blank ballots	2,568	0.93	+0.48		
Total	275,668			17	±0
Valid votes	275,668	98.27	–1.28		
Invalid votes	4,866	1.73	+1.28		
Votes cast / turnout	280,534	52.75	–26.41		
Abstentions	251,324	47.25	+26.41		
Registered voters	531,858				
Sources
Footnotes: ^{1} Within the Together for Catalonia alliance in the 2017 election.; ^{2} In Common We Can–We Can In Common results are compared to Catalonia in Common–We Can totals in the 2017 election.

=== 2017 ===
Summary of the 21 December 2017 Parliament of Catalonia election results in Girona
Parties and alliances	Popular vote			Seats	
Parties and alliances	Votes	%	±pp	Total	+/−
Together for Catalonia (JuntsxCat)^{1}	149,638	36.67	n/a	7	+2
Republican Left–Catalonia Yes (ERC–CatSí)^{1}	88,582	21.71	n/a	4	–1
Citizens–Party of the Citizenry (Cs)	79,634	19.51	+6.98	4	+2
Socialists' Party of Catalonia (PSC–PSOE)	35,197	8.62	–0.04	1	±0
Popular Unity Candidacy (CUP)	21,708	5.32	–3.26	1	±0
Catalonia in Common–We Can (CatComú–Podem)^{2}	16,482	4.04	–0.73	0	–1
People's Party (PP)	11,646	2.85	–3.02	0	–1
Animalist Party Against Mistreatment of Animals (PACMA)	2,582	0.63	+0.16	0	±0
Zero Cuts–Green Group (Recortes Cero–GV)	560	0.14	–0.06	0	±0
For a Fairer World (PUM+J)	241	0.06	New	0	±0
Republican Dialogue (Diàleg)	0	0.00	New	0	±0
Together for Yes (Independents) (JxSí)^{1}	n/a	n/a	n/a	0	–1
Blank ballots	1,833	0.45	–0.08		
Total	408,103			17	±0
Valid votes	408,103	99.55	+0.08		
Invalid votes	1,863	0.45	–0.08		
Votes cast / turnout	409,966	79.16	+3.22		
Abstentions	107,919	20.84	–3.22		
Registered voters	517,885				
Sources
Footnotes: ^{1} Within the Junts pel Sí alliance in the 2015 election. Totals for JuntsxCat are compared to CDC. Totals for ERC–CatSí include DC and MES. Also including JuntsxCat and ERC aligned independents from 2015.; ^{2} Catalonia in Common–We Can results are compared to Catalonia Yes We Can totals in the 2015 election.

=== 2015 ===
Summary of the 27 September 2015 Parliament of Catalonia election results in Girona
Parties and alliances	Popular vote			Seats	
Parties and alliances	Votes	%	±pp	Total	+/−
Together for Yes (JxSí)^{1}	216,333	56.06	–4.67	11	–1
Citizens–Party of the Citizenry (C's)	48,346	12.53	+8.95	2	+2
Socialists' Party of Catalonia (PSC–PSOE)	33,416	8.66	–1.39	1	–1
Popular Unity Candidacy (CUP)	33,117	8.58	+4.38	1	+1
People's Party (PP)	22,660	5.87	–3.72	1	–1
Catalonia Yes We Can (CatSíqueesPot)^{2}	18,399	4.77	–1.14	1	±0
Democratic Union of Catalonia (unio.cat)	8,295	2.15	New	0	±0
Animalist Party Against Mistreatment of Animals (PACMA)	1,823	0.47	+0.02	0	±0
Zero Cuts–The Greens (Recortes Cero–EV)	759	0.20	New	0	±0
Pirates of Catalonia–To Decide Everything (Pirata.cat/XDT)	327	0.08	–0.25	0	±0
Let's Win Catalonia (Ganemos)	320	0.08	New	0	±0
Blank ballots	2,068	0.53	–0.88		
Total	385,863			17	±0
Valid votes	385,863	99.47	+0.27		
Invalid votes	2,050	0.53	–0.27		
Votes cast / turnout	387,913	75.94	+6.65		
Abstentions	122,913	24.06	–6.65		
Registered voters	510,826				
Sources
Footnotes: ^{1} Together for Yes results are compared to the combined totals of Convergence and Union and Republican Left of Catalonia in the 2012 election.; ^{2} Catalonia Yes We Can results are compared to Initiative for Catalonia Greens–United and Alternative Left totals in the 2012 election.

=== 2012 ===
Summary of the 25 November 2012 Parliament of Catalonia election results in Girona
Parties and alliances	Popular vote			Seats	
Parties and alliances	Votes	%	±pp	Total	+/−
Convergence and Union (CiU)	148,237	42.95	–2.15	9	±0
Republican Left of Catalonia–Catalonia Yes (ERC–CatSí)	61,358	17.78	+8.59	3	+1
Socialists' Party of Catalonia (PSC–PSOE)	34,688	10.05	–4.22	2	–1
People's Party (PP)	33,096	9.59	+0.96	2	+1
Initiative for Catalonia Greens–United and Alternative Left (ICV–EUiA)	20,397	5.91	+1.09	1	±0
Popular Unity Candidacy–Left Alternative (CUP)	14,499	4.20	New	0	±0
Citizens–Party of the Citizenry (C's)	12,341	3.58	+1.89	0	±0
Catalan Solidarity for Independence (SI)	6,011	1.74	–3.01	0	–1
Platform for Catalonia (PxC)	3,377	0.98	–1.22	0	±0
Blank Seats (EB)	1,946	0.56	–0.18	0	±0
Animalist Party Against Mistreatment of Animals (PACMA)	1,565	0.45	+0.06	0	±0
Pirates of Catalonia (Pirata.cat)	1,137	0.33	+0.15	0	±0
Hartos.org (Hartos.org)	718	0.21	New	0	±0
Union, Progress and Democracy (UPyD)	701	0.20	+0.12	0	±0
Republican Left (IR)	525	0.15	+0.08	0	±0
Communist Unification of Spain (UCE)	207	0.06	+0.04	0	±0
Blank ballots	4,319	1.25	–1.63		
Total	345,122			17	±0
Valid votes	345,122	99.20	+0.14		
Invalid votes	2,771	0.80	–0.14		
Votes cast / turnout	347,893	69.29	+9.80		
Abstentions	154,189	30.71	–9.80		
Registered voters	502,082				

=== 2010 ===
Summary of the 28 November 2010 Parliament of Catalonia election results in Girona
Parties and alliances	Popular vote			Seats	
Parties and alliances	Votes	%	±pp	Total	+/−
Convergence and Union (CiU)	131,932	45.10	+6.91	9	+2
Socialists' Party of Catalonia (PSC–PSOE)	41,742	14.27	–8.71	3	–1
Republican Left of Catalonia (ERC)	26,879	9.19	–10.04	2	–2
People's Party (PP)	25,248	8.63	+1.41	1	±0
Initiative for Catalonia Greens–United and Alternative Left (ICV–EUiA)	14,109	4.82	–2.82	1	±0
Catalan Solidarity for Independence (SI)	13,889	4.75	New	1	+1
Independence Rally (RI.cat)	9,557	3.27	New	0	±0
Platform for Catalonia (PxC)	6,441	2.20	New	0	±0
Citizens–Party of the Citizenry (C's)	4,954	1.69	+0.75	0	±0
Blank Seats–Citizens for Blank Votes (EB–CenB)^{1}	2,159	0.74	+0.31	0	±0
The Greens–European Green Group (EV–GVE)	1,548	0.53	New	0	±0
Anti-Bullfighting Party Against Mistreatment of Animals (PACMA)	1,129	0.39	+0.02	0	±0
Farmers for the Catalan Rural Dignity (PDR.cat)	824	0.28	New	0	±0
From Below (Des de Baix)	715	0.24	New	0	±0
Pirates of Catalonia (Pirata.cat)	574	0.20	New	0	±0
We Are All Equal (GLBTH/TSI)	312	0.11	New	0	±0
Reus Independent Coordinator (CORI)	276	0.09	New	0	±0
Pensioners in Action Party (PDLPEA)	271	0.09	New	0	±0
Union, Progress and Democracy (UPyD)	238	0.08	New	0	±0
Internationalist Socialist Workers' Party (POSI)	237	0.08	–0.14	0	±0
Communist Party of the Catalan People (PCPC)	233	0.08	–0.06	0	±0
Family and Life Party (PFiV)	225	0.08	±0.00	0	±0
Left Republican Party–Republican Left (PRE–IR)	202	0.07	New	0	±0
Republican Social Movement (MSR)	184	0.06	+0.01	0	±0
Spanish Phalanx of the CNSO (FE de las JONS)	172	0.06	New	0	±0
Communist Unification of Spain (UCE)	47	0.02	New	0	±0
Blank ballots	8,439	2.86	+0.86		
Total	292,536			17	±0
Valid votes	292,536	99.06	–0.32		
Invalid votes	2,790	0.94	+0.32		
Votes cast / turnout	295,326	59.49	+2.36		
Abstentions	201,095	40.51	–2.36		
Registered voters	496,421				
Sources
Footnotes: ^{1} Blank Seats–Citizens for Blank Votes results are compared to the combined totals of Unsubmissive Seats–Alternative of Discontented Democrats and Citizens for Blank Votes in the 2006 election.

=== 2006 ===
Summary of the 1 November 2006 Parliament of Catalonia election results in Girona
Parties and alliances	Popular vote			Seats	
Parties and alliances	Votes	%	±pp	Total	+/−
Convergence and Union (CiU)	104,840	38.19	–0.48	7	±0
Socialists' Party of Catalonia–Citizens for Change (PSC–CpC)	60,755	22.13	–1.52	4	±0
Republican Left of Catalonia (ERC)	52,799	19.23	–2.67	4	±0
Initiative for Catalonia Greens–United and Alternative Left (ICV–EUiA)	20,978	7.64	+2.30	1	±0
People's Party (PP)	19,808	7.22	–0.85	1	±0
Citizens–Party of the Citizenry (C's)	2,584	0.94	New	0	±0
The Greens–Green Alternative (EV–AV)	1,837	0.67	+0.05	0	±0
Catalan Republican Party (RC)	1,193	0.43	New	0	±0
Anti-Bullfighting Party Against Mistreatment of Animals (PACMA)	1,020	0.37	New	0	±0
Citizens for Blank Votes (CenB)	626	0.23	+0.10	0	±0
Internationalist Socialist Workers' Party (POSI)	601	0.22	+0.03	0	±0
Unsubmissive Seats–Alternative of Discontented Democrats (Ei–ADD)	546	0.20	New	0	±0
Communist Party of the Catalan People (PCPC)	393	0.14	+0.06	0	±0
For a Fairer World (PUM+J)	325	0.12	New	0	±0
Family and Life Party (PFiV)	220	0.08	New	0	±0
Forward Catalonia Platform (AES–DN)	212	0.08	New	0	±0
Republican Social Movement (MSR)	133	0.05	+0.03	0	±0
Humanist Party of Catalonia (PHC)	123	0.04	±0.00	0	±0
Blank ballots	5,516	2.01	+1.18		
Total	274,509			17	±0
Valid votes	274,509	99.38	–0.24		
Invalid votes	1,723	0.62	+0.24		
Votes cast / turnout	276,232	57.13	–8.14		
Abstentions	207,311	42.87	+8.14		
Registered voters	483,543				

=== 2003 ===
Summary of the 16 November 2003 Parliament of Catalonia election results in Girona
Parties and alliances	Popular vote			Seats	
Parties and alliances	Votes	%	±pp	Total	+/−
Convergence and Union (CiU)	118,286	38.67	–9.88	7	–2
Socialists' Party of Catalonia–Citizens for Change (PSC–CpC)^{1}	72,352	23.65	–5.57	4	–1
Republican Left of Catalonia (ERC)	66,989	21.90	+9.09	4	+2
People's Party (PP)	24,698	8.07	+2.02	1	±0
Initiative for Catalonia Greens–Alternative Left (ICV–EA)^{2}	16,328	5.34	+4.46	1	+1
The Greens–Green Alternative (EV–AV)	1,886	0.62	+0.13	0	±0
Republican Left–Left Republican Party (IR–PRE)	604	0.20	New	0	±0
Internationalist Socialist Workers' Party (POSI)	580	0.19	New	0	±0
Citizens for Blank Votes (CenB)	401	0.13	New	0	±0
Platform for Catalonia (PxC)	351	0.11	New	0	±0
Catalan State (EC)	260	0.08	+0.01	0	±0
Communist Party of the Catalan People (PCPC)	241	0.08	New	0	±0
Internationalist Struggle (LI (LIT–CI))	185	0.06	+0.02	0	±0
Humanist Party of Catalonia (PHC)	132	0.04	±0.00	0	±0
Republican Social Movement (MSR)	60	0.02	New	0	±0
Blank ballots	2,552	0.83	–0.03		
Total	305,905			17	±0
Valid votes	305,905	99.62	–0.03		
Invalid votes	1,166	0.38	+0.03		
Votes cast / turnout	307,071	65.27	+3.11		
Abstentions	163,391	34.73	–3.11		
Registered voters	470,462				
Sources
Footnotes: ^{1} Socialists' Party of Catalonia–Citizens for Change are compared to Socialists' Party–Citizens for Change–Initiative–Greens totals in the 1999 election.; ^{2} Initiative for Catalonia Greens–Alternative Left results are compared to United and Alternative Left totals in the 1999 election.

=== 1999 ===
Summary of the 17 October 1999 Parliament of Catalonia election results in Girona
Parties and alliances	Popular vote			Seats	
Parties and alliances	Votes	%	±pp	Total	+/−
Convergence and Union (CiU)	137,079	48.55	–0.08	9	±0
Socialists' Party–Citizens for Change–Initiative–Greens (PSC–CpC–IC–V)^{1}	82,502	29.22	–0.53	5	±0
Republican Left of Catalonia (ERC)	36,159	12.81	+0.54	2	±0
People's Party (PP)	17,079	6.05	–1.81	1	±0
United and Alternative Left (EUiA)^{2}	2,493	0.88	n/a	0	±0
The Greens–Ecologist Confederation of Catalonia (EV–CEC)^{2}	2,075	0.73	n/a	0	±0
The Greens–Green Alternative (EV–AV)	1,370	0.49	New	0	±0
Bounced Public Workers (TPR)	312	0.11	New	0	±0
Catalan State (EC)	206	0.07	New	0	±0
Natural Law Party (PLN)	156	0.06	New	0	±0
Espinalist Party (PE)	131	0.05	New	0	±0
Humanist Party of Catalonia (PHC)	124	0.04	New	0	±0
Internationalist Struggle (LI (LIT–CI))	119	0.04	New	0	±0
Catalans in the World (CAM)	110	0.04	New	0	±0
Blank ballots	2,426	0.86	+0.06		
Total	282,341			17	±0
Valid votes	282,341	99.65	+0.03		
Invalid votes	1,005	0.35	–0.03		
Votes cast / turnout	283,346	62.16	–5.59		
Abstentions	172,498	37.84	+5.59		
Registered voters	455,844				
Sources
Footnotes: ^{1} Socialists' Party–Citizens for Change–Initiative–Greens results are compared to the combined totals of the Socialists' Party of Catalonia and Initiative for Catalonia–The Greens in the 1995 election.; ^{2} Within the Initiative for Catalonia–The Greens alliance in the 1995 election.

=== 1995 ===
Summary of the 19 November 1995 Parliament of Catalonia election results in Girona
Parties and alliances	Popular vote			Seats	
Parties and alliances	Votes	%	±pp	Total	+/−
Convergence and Union (CiU)	140,012	48.63	–5.66	9	–2
Socialists' Party of Catalonia (PSC–PSOE)	74,124	25.74	+3.93	5	+1
Republican Left of Catalonia (ERC)	35,338	12.27	+0.67	2	±0
People's Party (PP)	22,618	7.86	+3.90	1	+1
Initiative for Catalonia–The Greens (IC–EV)^{1}	11,546	4.01	–0.43	0	±0
Ecologist Alternative of Catalonia (AEC)^{2}	1,122	0.39	–0.13	0	±0
Revolutionary Workers' Party (POR)	311	0.11	+0.03	0	±0
Workers' Revolutionary Party (PRT)^{3}	279	0.10	–0.53	0	±0
Citizens of Catalonia–Platform of Independents of Spain (PICC–PIE)	254	0.09	New	0	±0
Blank ballots	2,313	0.80	–0.41		
Total	287,917			17	±0
Valid votes	287,917	99.62	+0.21		
Invalid votes	1,111	0.38	–0.21		
Votes cast / turnout	289,028	67.75	+5.91		
Abstentions	137,560	32.25	–5.91		
Registered voters	426,588				
Sources
Footnotes: ^{1} Initiative for Catalonia–The Greens results are compared to the combined totals of Initiative for Catalonia, Green Alternative–Ecologist Movement of Catalonia and Party of the Communists of Catalonia in the 1992 election.; ^{2} Ecologist Alternative of Catalonia results are compared to The Greens–Green Union totals in the 1992 election.; ^{3} Workers' Revolutionary Party results are compared to Workers' Socialist Party totals in the 1992 election.

=== 1992 ===
Summary of the 15 March 1992 Parliament of Catalonia election results in Girona
Parties and alliances	Popular vote			Seats	
Parties and alliances	Votes	%	±pp	Total	+/−
Convergence and Union (CiU)	134,621	54.29	–1.98	11	±0
Socialists' Party of Catalonia (PSC–PSOE)	54,085	21.81	–1.82	4	–1
Republican Left of Catalonia (ERC)	28,764	11.60	+6.11	2	+1
People's Party (PP)^{1}	9,817	3.96	+0.24	0	±0
Initiative for Catalonia (IC)	8,333	3.36	–0.54	0	±0
Green Alternative–Ecologist Movement of Catalonia (AV–MEC)	1,554	0.63	–0.30	0	±0
Workers' Socialist Party (PST)	1,551	0.63	+0.32	0	±0
Democratic and Social Centre (CDS)	1,391	0.56	–2.62	0	±0
The Greens–Green Union (EV–UV)	1,291	0.52	New	0	±0
Party of the Communists of Catalonia (PCC)	1,128	0.45	New	0	±0
Ruiz-Mateos Group (ARM)	979	0.39	New	0	±0
Free Catalonia (CLL)	678	0.27	New	0	±0
Independent Socialists (SI)^{2}	460	0.19	+0.13	0	±0
Revolutionary Workers' Party of Spain (PORE)	203	0.08	–0.03	0	±0
Humanist Party (PH)	114	0.05	–0.01	0	±0
Blank ballots	3,002	1.21	+0.49		
Total	247,971			17	±0
Valid votes	247,971	99.41	+0.18		
Invalid votes	1,472	0.59	–0.18		
Votes cast / turnout	249,443	61.84	–3.79		
Abstentions	153,931	38.16	+3.79		
Registered voters	403,374				
Sources
Footnotes: ^{1} People's Party results are compared to People's Alliance totals in the 1988 election.; ^{2} Independent Socialists results are compared to Alliance for the Republic totals in the 1988 election.

=== 1988 ===
Summary of the 29 May 1988 Parliament of Catalonia election results in Gerona
Parties and alliances	Popular vote			Seats	
Parties and alliances	Votes	%	±pp	Total	+/−
Convergence and Union (CiU)	135,146	56.27	–3.37	11	±0
Socialists' Party of Catalonia (PSC–PSOE)	56,765	23.63	+2.13	5	+1
Republican Left of Catalonia (ERC)	13,175	5.49	–0.66	1	±0
Initiative for Catalonia (IC)^{1}	9,363	3.90	–1.77	0	±0
People's Alliance (AP)^{2}	8,941	3.72	–1.87	0	–1
Democratic and Social Centre (CDS)	7,631	3.18	New	0	±0
Green Alternative–Ecologist Movement of Catalonia (AV–MEC)	2,228	0.93	New	0	±0
The Ecologist Greens (EVE)	866	0.36	New	0	±0
The Greens (EV)	770	0.32	New	0	±0
Workers' Socialist Party (PST)	742	0.31	+0.05	0	±0
Social Democratic Party of Catalonia (PSDC)	726	0.30	+0.07	0	±0
Andalusian Party of Catalonia (PAC)	472	0.20	New	0	±0
Revolutionary Workers' Party of Spain (PORE)	268	0.11	+0.02	0	±0
Spanish Juntas (JJEE)	205	0.09	New	0	±0
Communist Unification of Spain (UCE)	205	0.09	New	0	±0
Communist Workers' League (LOC)	196	0.08	New	0	±0
Spanish Phalanx of the CNSO (FE–JONS)	193	0.08	New	0	±0
Republican Popular Unity (UPR)^{3}	160	0.07	–0.02	0	±0
Humanist Party of Catalonia (PHC)	144	0.06	New	0	±0
Alliance for the Republic (AxR)^{4}	136	0.06	–0.12	0	±0
Centrist Unity–Democratic Spanish Party (PED)	134	0.06	New	0	±0
Blank ballots	1,729	0.72	+0.18		
Total	240,195			17	±0
Valid votes	240,195	99.23	–0.11		
Invalid votes	1,869	0.77	+0.11		
Votes cast / turnout	242,064	65.63	–4.21		
Abstentions	126,784	34.37	+4.21		
Registered voters	368,848				
Sources
Footnotes: ^{1} Initiative for Catalonia results are compared to the combined totals of Unified Socialist Party of Catalonia, Agreement of the Catalan Left and Party of the Communists of Catalonia in the 1984 election.; ^{2} People's Alliance results are compared to People's Coalition totals in the 1984 election.; ^{3} Republican Popular Unity results are compared to Communist Party of Spain (Marxist–Leninist) totals in the 1984 election.; ^{4} Alliance for the Republic results are compared to Internationalist Socialist Workers' Party totals in the 1984 election.

=== 1984 ===
Summary of the 29 April 1984 Parliament of Catalonia election results in Gerona
Parties and alliances	Popular vote			Seats	
Parties and alliances	Votes	%	±pp	Total	+/−
Convergence and Union (CiU)	147,208	59.64	+22.52	11	+4
Socialists' Party of Catalonia (PSC–PSOE)	53,058	21.50	+1.86	4	±0
Republican Left of Catalonia (ERC)	15,175	6.15	–4.49	1	–1
People's Coalition (AP–PDP–UL)^{1}	13,807	5.59	+4.14	1	+1
Unified Socialist Party of Catalonia (PSUC)	7,811	3.16	–6.18	0	–1
Agreement of the Catalan Left (EEC)^{2}	3,861	1.56	–0.83	0	±0
Party of the Communists of Catalonia (PCC)^{3}	2,333	0.95	+0.47	0	±0
Workers' Socialist Party (PST)	637	0.26	New	0	±0
Social Democratic Party of Catalonia (PSDC)	570	0.23	New	0	±0
Internationalist Socialist Workers' Party (POSI)	435	0.18	New	0	±0
Revolutionary Workers' Party of Spain (PORE)	221	0.09	New	0	±0
Communist Party of Spain (Marxist–Leninist) (PCE (m–l))	213	0.09	New	0	±0
Revolutionary Communist League (LCR)	151	0.06	New	0	±0
Communist Movement of Catalonia (MCC)^{4}	0	0.00	–0.55	0	±0
Centrists of Catalonia (CC–UCD)	n/a	n/a	–15.16	0	–3
Blank ballots	1,339	0.54	–0.02		
Total	246,819			17	±0
Valid votes	246,819	99.34	–0.11		
Invalid votes	1,631	0.66	+0.11		
Votes cast / turnout	248,450	69.84	+2.12		
Abstentions	107,271	30.16	–2.12		
Registered voters	355,721				
Sources
Footnotes: ^{1} People's Coalition results are compared to Catalan Solidarity totals in the 1980 election.; ^{2} Agreement of the Catalan Left results are compared to Left Nationalists totals in the 1980 election.; ^{3} Party of the Communists of Catalonia results are compared to Communist Unity totals in the 1980 election.; ^{4} Communist Movement of Catalonia results are compared to Unity for Socialism totals in the 1980 election.

=== 1980 ===
Summary of the 20 March 1980 Parliament of Catalonia election results in Gerona
Parties and alliances	Popular vote			Seats	
Parties and alliances	Votes	%	±pp	Total	+/−
Convergence and Union (CiU)	84,451	37.12	n/a	7	n/a
Socialists' Party of Catalonia (PSC–PSOE)	44,691	19.64	n/a	4	n/a
Centrists of Catalonia (CC–UCD)	34,482	15.16	n/a	3	n/a
Republican Left of Catalonia (ERC)	24,201	10.64	n/a	2	n/a
Unified Socialist Party of Catalonia (PSUC)	21,253	9.34	n/a	1	n/a
Left Nationalists (NE)	5,427	2.39	n/a	0	n/a
Catalan Solidarity (SC)	3,288	1.45	n/a	0	n/a
Socialist Party of Andalusia–Andalusian Party (PSA–PA)	2,992	1.32	n/a	0	n/a
New Force (FN)	2,323	1.02	n/a	0	n/a
Unity for Socialism (CUPS)	1,262	0.55	n/a	0	n/a
Communist Unity (UC)	1,101	0.48	n/a	0	n/a
Left Bloc for National Liberation (BEAN)	777	0.34	n/a	0	n/a
Blank ballots	1,278	0.56	n/a		
Total	227,526			17	n/a
Valid votes	227,526	99.45	n/a		
Invalid votes	1,249	0.55	n/a		
Votes cast / turnout	228,775	67.72	n/a		
Abstentions	109,067	32.28	n/a		
Registered voters	337,842				
