= 1984 Catalan regional election =

Election in the Spanish region of Catalonia

- 29 April 1984

All 135 seats in the Parliament of Catalonia 68 seats needed for a majority
- Opinion polls
- Registered: 4,494,340 ▲1.4%
- Turnout: 2,892,486 (64.4%) ▲3.0 pp
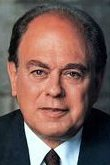

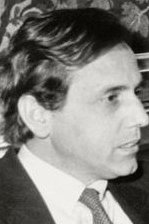

	First party	Second party	Third party
Leader	Jordi Pujol	Raimon Obiols	Eduard Bueno
Party	CiU	PSC–PSOE	AP–PDP–UL
Leader since	17 November 1974	12 July 1983	10 November 1983
Leader's seat	Barcelona	Barcelona	Barcelona
Last election	43 seats, 27.8%	33 seats, 22.4%	0 seats, 2.4% (Note: Results for SC in the 1980 election.)
Seats won	72	41	11
Seat change	▲29	▲8	▲11
Popular vote	1,346,729	866,281	221,601
Percentage	46.8%	30.1%	7.7%
Swing	▲19.0 pp	▲7.7 pp	▲5.3 pp
	Fourth party	Fifth party
Leader	Antoni Gutiérrez	Heribert Barrera
Party	PSUC	ERC
Leader since	1982	1980
Leader's seat	Barcelona	Barcelona
Last election	25 seats, 18.8%	14 seats, 8.9%
Seats won	6	5
Seat change	▼19	▼9
Popular vote	160,581	126,943
Percentage	5.6%	4.4%
Swing	▼13.2 pp	▼4.5 pp
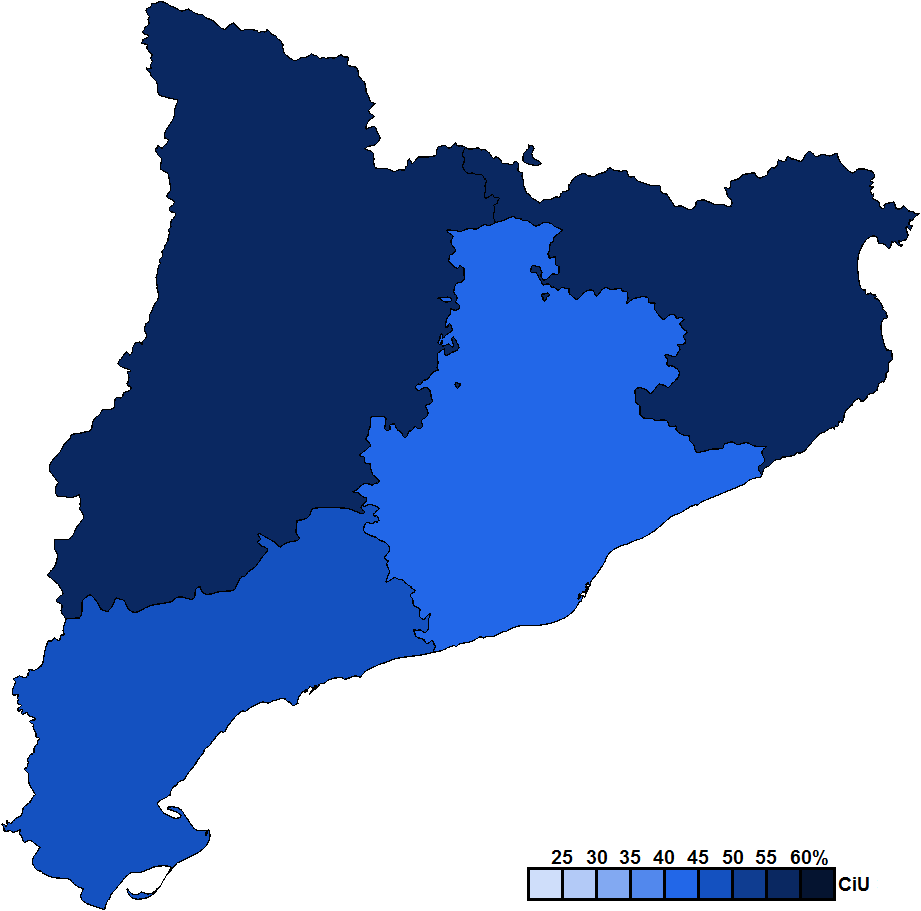
President before election
Jordi Pujol
CDC (CiU)
President after election
Jordi Pujol
CDC (CiU)

A regional election was held in Catalonia on 29 April 1984 to elect the 2nd Parliament of the autonomous community. All 135 seats in the Parliament were up for election.

== Overview ==
Under the 1979 Statute of Autonomy, the Parliament of Catalonia was the unicameral legislature of the homonymous autonomous community, having legislative power in devolved matters, as well as the ability to grant or withdraw confidence from a regional president. The electoral and procedural rules were supplemented by national law provisions (which were those used in the 1977 general election).

=== Date ===
The term of the Parliament of Catalonia expired four years after the date of its previous ordinary election. The election was required to be called no later than 15 days before the scheduled expiration date of parliament, with election day taking place within 60 days from the call. The previous election was held on 20 March 1980, which meant that the chamber's term would have expired on 20 March 1984. The election was required to be called no later than 5 March 1984, setting the latest possible date for election day on 4 May 1984.

The Parliament of Catalonia could not be dissolved before the expiration date of parliament, except in the event of an investiture process failing to elect a regional president within a two-month period from the first ballot. In such a case, the Parliament was to be automatically dissolved and a snap election called.

The election to the Parliament of Catalonia was officially called on 5 March 1984 with the publication of the corresponding decree in the Official Journal of the Government of Catalonia (DOGC), setting election day for 29 April.

=== Electoral system ===
Voting for the Parliament was based on universal suffrage, comprising all Spanish nationals over 18 years of age, registered in Catalonia and with full political rights.

The Parliament of Catalonia had a minimum of 100 and a maximum of 150 seats, with electoral provisions fixing its size at 135. All were elected in four multi-member constituencies—corresponding to the provinces of Barcelona, Gerona, Lérida and Tarragona, each of which was assigned a fixed number of seats—using the D'Hondt method and closed-list proportional voting, with a three percent-threshold of valid votes (including blank ballots) in each constituency. The use of this electoral method resulted in a higher effective threshold depending on district magnitude and vote distribution.

As a result of the aforementioned allocation, each Parliament constituency was entitled the following seats:

Seats	Constituencies
85	Barcelona
18	Tarragona
17	Gerona
15	Lérida

The law did not provide for by-elections to fill vacant seats; instead, any vacancies arising after the proclamation of candidates and during the legislative term were filled by the next candidates on the party lists or, when required, by designated substitutes.

== Parties and candidates ==
The electoral law allowed for parties and federations registered in the interior ministry, alliances and groupings of electors to present lists of candidates. Parties and federations intending to form an alliance were required to inform the relevant electoral commission within 15 days of the election call, whereas groupings of electors needed to secure the signature of at least one permille—and, in any case, 500 signatures—of the electorate in the constituencies for which they sought election, disallowing electors from signing for more than one list.

Below is a list of the main parties and alliances which contested the election:

Candidacy	Parties and alliances	Leading candidate	Ideology	Previous result		Gov.	Ref.
Candidacy	Parties and alliances	Leading candidate	Ideology	Vote %	Seats	Gov.	Ref.
CiU	List: Democratic Convergence of Catalonia (CDC); Democratic Union of Catalonia (UDC)	Jordi Pujol	Catalan nationalism Centrism	27.8%	43	Yes	
PSC–PSOE	List: Socialists' Party of Catalonia (PSC–PSOE)	Raimon Obiols	Social democracy	22.4%	33	No	
PSUC	List: Unified Socialist Party of Catalonia (PSUC)	Antoni Gutiérrez	Communism; Catalanism	18.8%	25	No	
ERC	List: Republican Left of Catalonia (ERC)	Heribert Barrera	Catalan nationalism Left-wing nationalism Social democracy	8.9%	14	Yes	
AP–PDP–UL	List: People's Alliance (AP); People's Democratic Party (PDP); Liberal Union (UL)	Eduard Bueno	Conservatism; Christian democracy	2.4%	0	No	

== Opinion polls ==
The tables below lists opinion polling results in reverse chronological order, showing the most recent first and using the dates when the survey fieldwork was done, as opposed to the date of publication. Where the fieldwork dates are unknown, the date of publication is given instead. The highest percentage figure in each polling survey is displayed with its background shaded in the leading party's colour. If a tie ensues, this is applied to the figures with the highest percentages. The "Lead" column on the right shows the percentage-point difference between the parties with the highest percentages in a poll.

=== Voting intention estimates ===
The table below lists weighted voting intention estimates. Refusals are generally excluded from the party vote percentages, while question wording and the treatment of "don't know" responses and those not intending to vote may vary between polling organisations. When available, seat projections determined by the polling organisations are displayed below (or in place of) the percentages in a smaller font; 68 seats were required for an absolute majority in the Parliament of Catalonia.

Polling firm/Commissioner	Fieldwork date	Sample size	Turnout	CiU	PSC	PSUC	CC–UCD	ERC	PA	AP–PDP–UL	EEC	CDS	Lead
1984 regional election	29 Apr 1984	—N/a	64.4	46.8; 72	30.1; 41	5.6; 6	–	4.4; 5	–	7.7; 11	1.2; 0	–	16.7
Iope–Etmar/El Periódico	12–17 Apr 1984	2,300	66–72	42.3; 64	30.6; 42	5.3; 5	–	6.0; 8	–	11.3; 16	–	–	11.7
Sofemasa/La Vanguardia (Note: Undecided and/or abstentionists excluded.)	11–13 Apr 1984	2,400	70	44.6; 66/68	32.1; 44/46	6.4; 7/8	–	4.6; 6	–	7.2; 9/10	2.1; 0/1	–	12.5
Metra Seis/El País	9–12 Apr 1984	2,700	64	36.9; 56/58	32.0; 43/45	8.6; 9/11	–	7.3; 9/10	–	9.9; 13/14	–	–	4.9
Avui	3 Apr 1984	?	?	40.2	23.6	–	–	–	–	–	–	–	16.6
Aresco/ABC	9–12 Mar 1984	2,200	?	41.0; 61	29.1; 42	6.9; 6	–	6.3; 6	–	13.9; 20	–	–	11.9
Sofemasa/La Vanguardia	21–23 Mar 1984	2,400	?	33.7; 51/54	38.8; 49/52	8.2; 9/11	–	6.2; 8/10	–	8.8; 12/13	–	–	5.1
1982 general election	28 Oct 1982	—N/a	80.8	22.5 (35)	45.8 (68)	4.6 (5)	2.0 (1)	4.0 (5)	0.2 (0)	14.7 (21)	0.9 (0)	2.0 (0)	23.3
1980 regional election	20 Mar 1980	—N/a	61.3	27.8; 43	22.4; 33	18.8; 25	10.6; 18	8.9; 14	2.7; 2	2.4; 0	1.7; 0	–	5.4

=== Voting preferences ===
The table below lists raw, unweighted voting preferences.

Polling firm/Commissioner	Fieldwork date	Sample size	CiU	PSC	PSUC	CC–UCD	ERC	PA	AP–PDP–UL	EEC	CDS	Question	X mark	Lead
1984 regional election	29 Apr 1984	—N/a	30.0	19.3	3.6	–	2.8	–	4.9	0.8	–	—N/a	35.6	10.7
CIS	23–25 Apr 1984	2,281	38.2	19.7	3.7	–	4.0	–	4.7	–	–	16.0	10.6	18.5
CIS	15 Apr 1984	2,385	28.0	22.4	2.8	–	3.6	–	3.2	–	–	29.2	9.0	5.6
Sofemasa/La Vanguardia	11–13 Apr 1984	2,400	27.9	20.1	4.0	–	2.9	–	4.5	1.3	–	24.8	10.6	7.8
CIS	10 Apr 1984	1,044	28.0	26.0	5.0	–	3.0	–	6.0	–	–	24.0	6.0	2.0
DYM/CIS	1 Apr 1984	2,271	26.5	20.9	3.6	–	2.9	–	3.6	–	–	35.9	4.6	5.6
Sofemasa/La Vanguardia	21–23 Mar 1984	2,400	20.2	23.3	4.9	–	3.7	–	5.3	–	–	31.1	8.9	3.1
CIS	1 Mar 1984	2,466	25.2	22.4	3.9	–	2.7	–	4.2	–	–	33.2	6.5	2.8
Metra Seis/CIS	1 Jan 1984	2,101	27.0	22.0	5.0	–	2.0	–	4.0	–	–	31.0	7.0	5.0
CIS (Note: "Estudio 1.377 (Diciembre 1983)" (PDF). CIS (in Spanish). 1 November 1983. Archived from the original on 17 November 2019.)	1 Nov 1983	1,680	24.0	27.0	5.0	–	4.0	–	6.0	1.0	–	26.0	7.0	3.0
DYM/CIS	1 Sep 1983	2,198	19.3	35.7	5.0	–	3.4	–	3.2	0.6	–	22.8	8.7	16.4
1983 local elections	8 May 1983	—N/a	17.0	26.9	7.6	–	1.9	–	6.3	0.1	0.4	—N/a	32.6	9.9
1982 general election	28 Oct 1982	—N/a	17.9	36.5	3.7	1.6	3.2	0.2	11.7	0.7	1.6	—N/a	19.2	18.6
1980 regional election	20 Mar 1980	—N/a	17.0	13.7	11.5	6.5	5.4	1.6	1.4	1.0	–	—N/a	38.7	3.3

=== Victory likelihood ===
The table below lists opinion polling on the perceived likelihood of victory for each party in the event of a regional election taking place.

Polling firm/Commissioner	Fieldwork date	Sample size	CiU	PSC	PSUC	ERC	AP–PDP–UL	Other/ None	Question	Lead
CIS	23–25 Apr 1984	2,281	70.0	14.1	0.3	0.8	1.0	0.4	13.3	55.9
CIS	15 Apr 1984	2,385	41.4	22.0	1.0	0.7	1.9	0.2	32.7	19.4
CIS	10 Apr 1984	1,044	42.0	27.0	1.0	1.0	4.0	–	25.0	15.0
DYM/CIS	1 Apr 1984	2,271	42.1	22.7	2.2	0.8	2.3	0.2	29.7	19.4
CIS	1 Mar 1984	2,466	41.3	19.3	0.9	0.9	2.6	–	35.0	22.0
Metra Seis/CIS	1 Jan 1984	2,101	38.0	23.0	2.0	1.0	4.0	–	31.0	15.0
CIS	1 Nov 1983	1,680	33.0	33.0	–	–	–	6.0	28.0	Tie
DYM/CIS	1 Sep 1983	2,198	28.9	43.9	–	–	–	7.9	19.3	15.0

=== Preferred President ===
The table below lists opinion polling on leader preferences to become president of the Government of Catalonia.

Polling firm/Commissioner	Fieldwork date	Sample size						Other/ None/ Not care	Question	Lead
Polling firm/Commissioner	Fieldwork date	Sample size	Pujol CiU	Obiols PSC	Gutiérrez PSUC	Barrera ERC	Bueno CP	Other/ None/ Not care	Question	Lead
CIS	23–25 Apr 1984	2,281	51.1	21.1	4.2	6.2	3.3	6.3	7.8	30.0
CIS	15 Apr 1984	2,385	40.9	20.5	3.4	4.7	2.5	–	28.1	20.4
Sofemasa/La Vanguardia	11–13 Apr 1984	2,400	36.9	25.5	9.1	10.3	6.3	11.9		11.4
Metra Seis/El País	9–12 Apr 1984	2,700	36.1	22.1	7.8	7.8	4.3	21.9		14.0
CIS	10 Apr 1984	1,044	37.0	26.0	7.0	4.0	5.0	–	21.0	11.0
DYM/CIS	1 Apr 1984	2,271	37.4	18.2	5.0	5.4	3.0	3.6	27.4	19.2
Sofemasa/La Vanguardia	21–23 Mar 1984	2,400	30.8	22.0	9.3	8.5	6.5	22.9		8.8
CIS	1 Mar 1984	2,466	34.8	16.2	3.2	4.4	3.5	–	37.9	18.6
Metra Seis/CIS	1 Jan 1984	2,101	50.0	26.0	–	–	–	–	23.0	24.0
CIS	1 Nov 1983	1,680	34.0	19.0	5.0	7.0	3.0	–	32.0	15.0
DYM/CIS	1 Sep 1983	2,198	32.1	16.5	6.1	8.7	–	1.5	35.1	15.6

== Results ==
=== Overall ===
← Summary of the 29 April 1984 Parliament of Catalonia election results →
Parties and alliances	Popular vote			Seats	
Parties and alliances	Votes	%	±pp	Total	+/−
Convergence and Union (CiU)	1,346,729	46.80	+18.97	72	+29
Socialists' Party of Catalonia (PSC–PSOE)	866,281	30.11	+7.68	41	+8
People's Coalition (AP–PDP–UL)^{1}	221,601	7.70	+5.33	11	+11
Unified Socialist Party of Catalonia (PSUC)	160,581	5.58	−13.19	6	−19
Republican Left of Catalonia (ERC)	126,943	4.41	−4.49	5	−9
Party of the Communists of Catalonia (PCC)^{2}	68,836	2.39	+2.09	0	±0
Agreement of the Catalan Left (EEC)^{3}	35,937	1.25	−0.41	0	±0
Spanish Vertex Ecological Development Revindication (VERDE)	8,714	0.30	New	0	±0
Social Democratic Party of Catalonia (PSDC)	6,768	0.24	New	0	±0
Workers' Socialist Party (PST)	5,381	0.19	New	0	±0
Internationalist Socialist Workers' Party (POSI)	3,533	0.12	New	0	±0
Revolutionary Workers' Party of Spain (PORE)	2,694	0.09	New	0	±0
Communist Workers' Party of Catalonia (PCOC)	2,593	0.09	−0.39	0	±0
Revolutionary Communist League (LCR)	1,861	0.06	New	0	±0
Communist Party of Spain (Marxist–Leninist) (PCE (m–l))	1,834	0.06	New	0	±0
Spanish Democratic Party (PDE)	1,110	0.04	New	0	±0
Party of Lleida (PLL)	856	0.03	New	0	±0
Unity of Aran–Aranese Nationalist Party (UA–PNA)	787	0.03	New	0	±0
Communist Movement of Catalonia (MCC)^{4}	164	0.01	−1.21	0	±0
Centrists of Catalonia (CC–UCD)	n/a	n/a	−10.61	0	−18
Socialist Party of Andalusia–Andalusian Party (PSA–PA)	n/a	n/a	−2.66	0	−2
Blank ballots	14,313	0.49	−0.17		
Total	2,877,516			135	±0
Valid votes	2,877,516	99.48	−0.02		
Invalid votes	14,970	0.52	+0.02		
Votes cast / turnout	2,892,486	64.36	+3.02		
Abstentions	1,601,854	35.64	−3.02		
Registered voters	4,494,340				
Sources
Footnotes: ^{1} People's Coalition results are compared to Catalan Solidarity totals in the 1980 election.; ^{2} Party of the Communists of Catalonia results are compared to Communist Unity totals in the 1980 election.; ^{3} Agreement of the Catalan Left results are compared to Left Nationalists totals in the 1980 election.; ^{4} Communist Movement of Catalonia results are compared to Unity for Socialism totals in the 1980 election.

Popular vote
CiU	46.80%
PSC–PSOE	30.11%
AP–PDP–UL	7.70%
PSUC	5.58%
ERC	4.41%
PCC	2.39%
EEC	1.25%
Others	1.34%
Blank ballots	0.49%

Seats
CiU	53.33%
PSC–PSOE	30.37%
AP–PDP–UL	8.15%
PSUC	4.44%
ERC	3.70%

=== Distribution by constituency ===
Constituency	CiU		PSC		CP		PSUC		ERC	
Constituency	%	S	%	S	%	S	%	S	%	S
Barcelona	44.3	41	32.3	29	7.6	7	6.1	5	4.1	3
Gerona	59.6	11	21.5	4	5.6	1	3.2	−	6.1	1
Lérida	57.7	10	19.9	3	8.8	1	2.8	−	5.7	1
Tarragona	48.1	10	26.7	5	10.2	2	5.3	1	4.6	−
Total	46.8	72	30.1	41	7.7	11	5.6	6	4.4	5

== Aftermath ==
Investiture; Nomination of Jordi Pujol (CDC)
Ballot →	30 May 1984
Required majority →	68 out of 135
Yes: • CiU (72); • AP–PDP–UL (11); • ERC (4)	87 / 135
No: • PSC (38); • PSUC (6)	44 / 135
Abstentions: • PSC (3); • ERC (1)	4 / 135
Absentees	0 / 135

== Bibliography ==
Legislation

- Real Decreto-ley 20/1977, de 18 de marzo, sobre Normas Electorales (Royal Decree-Law 20/1977). Official State Gazette (in Spanish). 18 March 1977. BOE-A-1977-7445.
- Ley Orgánica 4/1979, de 18 de diciembre, de Estatuto de Autonomía de Cataluña (Organic Law 4/1979). Official State Gazette (in Spanish). 18 December 1979. BOE-A-1979-30178.
- Ley 3/1982, de 23 de marzo, del Parlamento, del Presidente y del Consejo Ejecutivo de la Generalidad (Law 3/1982). Official State Gazette (in Spanish). 23 March 1982. BOE-A-1982-10330.
- Decreto 45/1984, de 5 de marzo, de la Presidencia de la Generalidad de Cataluña, por el que se convocan elecciones al Parlamento de Cataluña (PDF) (Decree 45/1984). Official Journal of the Government of Catalonia (in Spanish). 5 March 1984.

Other

- Autonomous University of Barcelona (1984). "Las elecciones al Parlamento de Cataluña de 29 de abril de 1984" (PDF). Revista de Estudios Políticos (in Spanish) (40). Madrid: Centre for Political and Constitutional Studies: 155–187. ISSN 0048-7694.
