= 1980 Catalan regional election =

Election in the Spanish region of Catalonia

- 20 March 1980

All 135 seats in the Parliament of Catalonia 68 seats needed for a majority
- Opinion polls
- Registered: 4,432,776
- Turnout: 2,718,888 (61.3%)
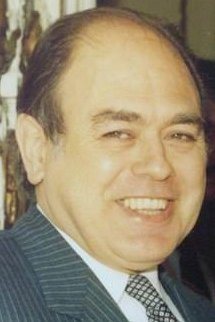

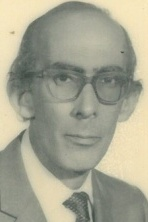

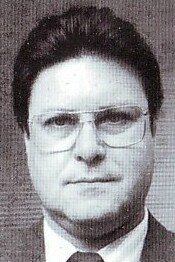
	First party	Second party	Third party
Leader	Jordi Pujol	Joan Reventós	Josep Benet
Party	CiU	PSC–PSOE	PSUC
Leader since	19 September 1978	16 July 1978	23 June 1978
Leader's seat	Barcelona	Barcelona	Barcelona
Seats won	43	33	25
Popular vote	752,943	606,717	507,753
Percentage	27.8%	22.4%	18.8%
	Fourth party	Fifth party	Sixth party
Leader	Antón Cañellas	Heribert Barrera	Francisco Hidalgo
Party	CC–UCD	ERC	PSA–PA
Leader since	23 December 1979	1976	1980
Leader's seat	Barcelona	Barcelona	Barcelona
Seats won	18	14	2
Popular vote	286,922	240,871	71,841
Percentage	10.6%	8.9%	2.7%
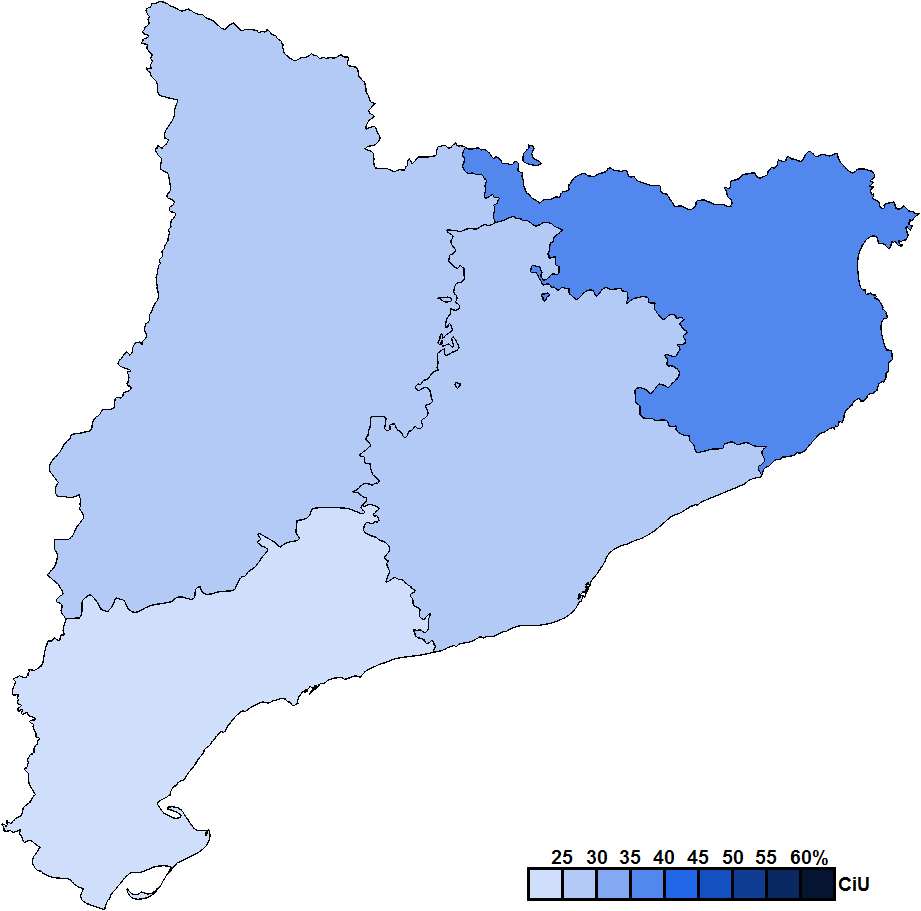
President before election
Josep Tarradellas
ERC
President after election
Jordi Pujol
CDC (CiU)

A regional election was held in Catalonia on 20 March 1980 to elect the 1st Parliament of the autonomous community. All 135 seats in the Parliament were up for election. This was the first regional election to be held in Catalonia since the Spanish transition to democracy and the second democratic regional election in Catalan history after that of 1932.

The election results granted a victory with nearly 28% of the vote and 43 seats for the Catalan nationalist Convergence and Union (CiU), the alliance of Democratic Convergence of Catalonia (CDC) and Democratic Union of Catalonia (UDC) led by Jordi Pujol, despite earlier predictions that the Socialists' Party of Catalonia (PSC–PSOE) would emerge as the largest party in parliament and maintain the first place it had achieved in the 1977 and 1979 general elections. Compared to the general elections, the PSC ambiguous positions throughout the campaign were said to have cost them votes both to the Unified Socialist Party of Catalonia (PSUC) and to the Republican Left of Catalonia (ERC)—both of which saw improvements to their general election results—as well as to abstention and, to a lesser extent, to the Socialist Party of Andalusia–Andalusian Party (PSA–PA), which was only narrowly able to enter the Parliament. Results for the Centrists of Catalonia (CC–UCD) alliance were seen as disappointing, having lost many votes to Pujol's coalition and being shut from any chance to lead the regional government.

The complicated parliamentary arithmetic resulting from the election—with the only alliances able to command an absolute majority being CiU–PSC (76 seats), CiU–UCD–ERC (75) and PSC–PSUC–ERC (72)—raised concerns on Pujol's prospects for a successful investiture. In the end, Pujol would be able to get elected as Catalan president through the support from both UCD and ERC in a second ballot held on 24 April 1980. The election would mark the beginning of 23 years of uninterrupted Pujol's rule and the start of CiU's hegemony in regional politics for decades to come.

== Background ==
Historical precedents for Catalan autonomy after the Nueva Planta decrees of 1714 dated back to the Spanish Draft Constitution of 1873, with Catalonia as one out of the seventeen projected states within the Spanish federal state; the Commonwealth of Catalonia established in 1914 as the only such provincial association that came to exist; and finally as an autonomous region during the Second Spanish Republic. In 1931, the Government of Catalonia (Catalan: Generalitat de Catalunya) was restored, followed by the approval of a Statute of Autonomy in 1932 which was of application until the outbreak of the Spanish Civil War and the disestablishment of the Second Republic, when Catalan autonomy was suppressed by the Francoist regime.

The death of dictator Francisco Franco in 1975 and the start of the Spanish transition to democracy led to negotiations between the Spanish government under then Prime Minister Adolfo Suárez and Catalan president-in-exile Josep Tarradellas over the issue of Catalan autonomy, leading to the re-establishment of the regional Catalan government on 5 October 1977 and in Tarradellas's return to Catalonia on 23 October. Further negotiations between Catalan political parties ensued for the drafting of a new statute of autonomy, to be known as the "Statute of Sau" (Catalan: Estatut de Sau), which would be submitted for review on 29 December 1978 and would secure the favourable ruling of the Cortes Generales on 13 August 1979. After being ratified in referendum it would obtain the final approval of the Cortes and published in the Official State Gazette on 22 December, paving the way for the first Catalan regional election since the Second Spanish Republic to be held.

== Overview ==
Under the 1979 Statute of Autonomy, the Parliament of Catalonia was the unicameral legislature of the homonymous autonomous community, having legislative power in devolved matters, as well as the ability to grant or withdraw confidence from a regional president. The electoral and procedural rules were supplemented by national law provisions (which were those used in the 1977 general election).

=== Date ===
The Executive Council of the Provisional Generalitat of Catalonia, in agreement with the Government of Spain, was required to call an election to the Parliament of Catalonia within 15 days after the date of enactment of the Statute, with election day taking place within 60 days after the call.

The Parliament of Catalonia could not be dissolved before the expiration date of parliament, except in the event of an investiture process failing to elect a regional president within a two-month period from the first ballot. In such a case, the Parliament was to be automatically dissolved and a snap election called.

Initially scheduled for either 13 or 16 March 1980, lack of agreement on the date of the election between the various Catalan political parties resulted in several weeks of speculation that President Josep Tarradellas would choose to trigger a government crisis that could further delay the election in an attempt to ensure his continuity in office. However on 17 January, after deliberations by the Executive Council and in agreement with the State Government, President Tarradellas announced the election for 20 March.

The election to the Parliament of Catalonia was officially called on 21 January 1980 with the publication of the corresponding decree in the Official Journal of the Government of Catalonia, setting election day for 20 March.

=== Electoral system ===
Voting for the Parliament was based on universal suffrage, comprising all Spanish nationals over 18 years of age, registered in Catalonia and with full political rights.

The Parliament of Catalonia had 135 seats in its first election. All were elected in four multi-member constituencies—corresponding to the provinces of Barcelona, Gerona, Lérida and Tarragona, each of which was assigned a fixed number of seats—using the D'Hondt method and closed-list proportional voting, with a three percent-threshold of valid votes (including blank ballots) in each constituency. The use of this electoral method resulted in a higher effective threshold depending on district magnitude and vote distribution.

As a result of the aforementioned allocation, each Parliament constituency was entitled the following seats:

Seats	Constituencies
85	Barcelona
18	Tarragona
17	Gerona
15	Lérida

The law did not provide for by-elections to fill vacant seats; instead, any vacancies arising after the proclamation of candidates and during the legislative term were filled by the next candidates on the party lists or, when required, by designated substitutes.

== Parties and candidates ==
The electoral law allowed for parties and federations registered in the interior ministry, alliances and groupings of electors to present lists of candidates. Parties and federations intending to form an alliance were required to inform the relevant electoral commission within 15 days of the election call, whereas groupings of electors needed to secure the signature of at least one permille—and, in any case, 500 signatures—of the electorate in the constituencies for which they sought election, disallowing electors from signing for more than one list.

Below is a list of the main parties and alliances which contested the election:

Candidacy	Parties and alliances	Leading candidate	Ideology	Gov.	Ref.
PSC–PSOE	List: Socialists' Party of Catalonia (PSC–PSOE)	Joan Reventós	Social democracy	Yes	
CC–UCD	List: Centrists of Catalonia (CC–UCD)	Antón Cañellas	Christian democracy Social democracy Liberalism	Yes	
PSUC	List: Unified Socialist Party of Catalonia (PSUC)	Josep Benet	Communism; Catalanism	Yes	
CiU	List: Democratic Convergence of Catalonia (CDC); Democratic Union of Catalonia (UDC)	Jordi Pujol	Catalan nationalism Centrism	Yes	
ERC	List: Republican Left of Catalonia (ERC)	Heribert Barrera	Catalan nationalism Left-wing nationalism Social democracy	Yes	
PSA–PA	List: Socialist Party of Andalusia–Andalusian Party (PSA–PA)	Francisco Hidalgo	Andalusian nationalism Socialism; Marxism	No	

The Socialists' Party of Catalonia (PSC–PSOE) had been formed in July 1978 out of the merger between the Socialist Party of Catalonia–Congress (PSC–C), the Socialist Party of Catalonia–Regrouping (PSC–R) and the Catalan Socialist Federation (FSC–PSOE), as a result of lengthy negotiations throughout 1977 after the success of the Socialists of Catalonia alliance in the 1977 general election. Tensions resulting from the merger would be common during the ensuing years, and in late 1979 political and organizational discrepancies between the various factions within the unified PSC–PSOE led to an internal crisis, which had led party leader and prospective leading candidate Joan Reventós to threaten with his resignation should the crisis not be resolved ahead of the incoming Catalan regional election.

Throughout 1978, an operation was launched for the establishment of two centrist electoral blocs, aimed at supporting Tarradellas's re-election and dispute the electoral hegemony in Catalonia from the PSC–PSOE and the Unified Socialist Party of Catalonia (PSUC) ahead of the incoming 1979 general, local and, ultimately, 1980 regional elections: a Catalan nationalist pole formed by Republican Left of Catalonia (ERC) and Jordi Pujol's Democratic Convergence of Catalonia (CDC), and another one formed around the Union of the Democratic Centre (UCD)—and joined by christian democratic parties breaking away from the Democratic Union of Catalonia (UDC)-led Union of the Centre and Christian Democracy of Catalonia (UCiDCC) coalition, such as the Union of the Centre of Catalonia (UCC) or the Democratic Union Broad Centre (UDCA). This attempt would not succeed, with Tarradellas ending up forfeiting his re-election bid after a final, last-ditch attempt to form a candidacy made of independents in February 1980, but it would provide the basis for the long-term Convergence and Union (CiU) alliance formed between CDC and UDC, as well as for the constitution of Centrists of Catalonia (CC–UCD), a merger of UCD and UDCA which had also included UCC in its first years.

Negotiations for the formation of CiU had been underway between CDC and UDC throughout August 1978 and were formalized on September that year, aiming at establishing a big tent alliance of Catalan nationalist parties that could appeal both to centre-left and centre-right voters. CDC had contested the 1977 general election within the Democratic Pact for Catalonia, together with Democratic Left of Catalonia (EDC)—which merged into CDC in June 1978—and National Front of Catalonia (FNC) for the Congress, whereas UDC had formed the UCiDCC coalition together with the Catalan Centre party; the parties from both alliances had also formed the Democracy and Catalonia coalition for the 1977 Senate election. In the case of CC–UCD, it had been formed as an electoral alliance in 1978 by UCD, UCC and UDCA ahead of the 1979 general and local elections. UCC itself had been the result of the merging between the Catalan Centre, the League of Catalonia–Catalan Liberal Party and defectors from UDC, and it had been intended that the regional UCD branch would also eventually merge with the party. In a joint congress on 22 December 1979, UCD and UDCA agreed to transform the alliance into a permanent political party, but UCC did not join the operation and chose not to contest the regional election, with the party eventually merging into CDC in late 1980.

The Socialist Party of Andalusia–Andalusian Party (PSA–PA) chose to contest the Catalan election out of "defending the interests of Andalusian people wherever they are", in reference to the large Andalusian community in Catalonia (840,000 at the beginning of the 1970s). The People's Alliance (AP) did not directly contest the election, instead giving its support to the Catalan Solidarity candidacy.

About 2,100 candidates from 16 political parties stood for election, with eleven candidacies running in all four provinces: the main parties PSC, UCD, PSUC, CiU, ERC and PSA, as well as the Left Nationalists (NE), the Unity for Socialism (CUPS) alliance, New Force (FN), the Left Bloc for National Liberation (BEAN) and the Communist Unity (UC).

== Opinion polls ==
The tables below list opinion polling results in reverse chronological order, showing the most recent first and using the dates when the survey fieldwork was done, as opposed to the date of publication. Where the fieldwork dates are unknown, the date of publication is given instead. The highest percentage figure in each polling survey is displayed with its background shaded in the leading party's colour. If a tie ensues, this is applied to the figures with the highest percentages. The "Lead" column on the right shows the percentage-point difference between the parties with the highest percentages in a poll.

=== Voting intention estimates ===
The table below lists weighted voting intention estimates. Refusals are generally excluded from the party vote percentages, while question wording and the treatment of "don't know" responses and those not intending to vote may vary between polling organisations. When available, seat projections determined by the polling organisations are displayed below (or in place of) the percentages in a smaller font; 68 seats were required for an absolute majority in the Parliament of Catalonia.

Polling firm/Commissioner	Fieldwork date	Sample size	Turnout	PSC	CC–UCD	PSUC	CiU	ERC	SC	PA	Lead
1980 regional election	20 Mar 1980	—N/a	61.3	22.4; 33	10.6; 18	18.8; 25	27.8; 43	8.9; 14	2.4; 0	2.7; 2	5.4
ICM	17 Mar 1980	800	59.5	26.1	11.6	20.1	24.2	5.9	3.3	2.8	1.9
ICSA–Gallup/SC	12–14 Mar 1980	1,480	57.9	26.9	10.6	20.5	23.7	6.3	3.0	2.7	3.2
ICSA–Gallup/SC	10–12 Mar 1980	1,200	57.2	26.1	10.4	21.5	23.1	6.8	2.2	2.7	3.0
ICSA–Gallup/SC	3–5 Mar 1980	1,000	50.1	27.1	11.5	22.6	21.7	5.4	2.5	3.1	4.5
CC–UCD	28 Feb 1980	2,500	68	26.0	20.0	16.0	18.0	–	–	–	6.0
Facta Vector/UCD	22 Jan 1980	2,000	?	28.3; 45	18.2; 31	15.3; 22	15.6; 27	4.3; 7	? 0/3	? 0/3	10.1
GAPNE/CDC	10–20 Jan 1980	1,600	?	27.0	21.6	16.0	23.0	9.0	1.4	–	4.0
CC–UCD	19 Jan 1980	3,000	75	29.0	15.5	19.0	19.5	4.0	–	–	9.5
1979 general election	1 Mar 1979	—N/a	67.6	29.7 (45)	19.3 (32)	17.4 (25)	16.4 (26)	4.2 (4)	3.6 (Note: Results for CD.) (3)	–	10.4

=== Voting preferences ===
The table below lists raw, unweighted voting preferences.

Polling firm/Commissioner	Fieldwork date	Sample size	PSC	CC–UCD	PSUC	CiU	ERC	SC	PA	Question	X mark	Lead
1980 regional election	20 Mar 1980	—N/a	13.7	6.5	11.5	17.0	5.4	1.4	1.6	—N/a	38.7	3.3
Emopública/CIS	8–12 Mar 1980	2,000	14.3	4.1	12.0	16.0	3.9	0.8	1.6	33.1	10.4	1.7
GAPNE/CDC	4–7 Mar 1980	800	22.8	5.9	15.6	20.2	3.6	–	0.3	12.8	17.6	2.6
ECO/PSC	6 Mar 1980	2,000	18.1	10.8	14.0	14.9	–	–	–	–	–	3.2
GAPNE/CDC	10–20 Feb 1980	?	26.3	13.0	16.8	22.6	3.2	0.7	–	15.9		3.7
DYM–ODEC/CIS	11–12 Feb 1980	2,008	20.2	5.3	9.9	10.2	4.6	0.5	1.3	32.5	12.6	10.0
ECO/PSC	6 Feb 1980	?	25.0	9.7	13.1	12.4	2.3	0.5	–	28.4	7.1	11.9
GAPNE/CDC	10–20 Jan 1980	1,600	27.0	13.5	16.4	21.5	4.9	1.4	–	14.3		5.5
1979 general election	1 Mar 1979	—N/a	19.7	12.9	11.5	10.9	2.8	2.4	–	—N/a	32.4	6.8

=== Victory likelihood ===
The table below lists opinion polling on the perceived likelihood of victory for each party in the event of a regional election taking place.

Polling firm/Commissioner	Fieldwork date	Sample size	PSC	CC–UCD	PSUC	CiU	ERC	SC	PA	Other/ None	Question	Lead
Emopública/CIS	8–12 Mar 1980	2,000	29.0	8.5	5.0	14.8	0.9	0.5	0.1	0.1	41.0	14.2
DYM–ODEC/CIS	11–12 Feb 1980	2,008	30.5	9.2	4.0	6.6	1.3	0.3	0.1	0.4	47.4	21.3

=== Preferred President ===
The table below lists opinion polling on leader preferences to become president of the Government of Catalonia.

Polling firm/Commissioner	Fieldwork date	Sample size					Other/ None/ Not care	Question	Lead
Polling firm/Commissioner	Fieldwork date	Sample size	Reventós PSC	Cañellas CC–UCD	Benet PSUC	Pujol CiU	Other/ None/ Not care	Question	Lead
GAPNE/CDC	10–20 Feb 1980	?	20.8	2.9	11.1	50.5	14.7		29.7
GAPNE/CDC	10–20 Jan 1980	1,600	29.0	9.0	12.0	36.0	14.0		7.0

=== Predicted President ===
The table below lists opinion polling on the perceived likelihood for each leader to become president.

Polling firm/Commissioner	Fieldwork date	Sample size					Other/ None/ Not care	Question	Lead
Polling firm/Commissioner	Fieldwork date	Sample size	Reventós PSC	Cañellas CC–UCD	Benet PSUC	Pujol CiU	Other/ None/ Not care	Question	Lead
GAPNE/CDC	10–20 Jan 1980	1,600	22.6	1.6	6.0	22.5	47.3		0.1

== Results ==
=== Overall ===
Summary of the 20 March 1980 Parliament of Catalonia election results →
Parties and alliances	Popular vote			Seats	
Parties and alliances	Votes	%	±pp	Total	+/−
Convergence and Union (CiU)	752,943	27.83	n/a	43	n/a
Socialists' Party of Catalonia (PSC–PSOE)	606,717	22.43	n/a	33	n/a
Unified Socialist Party of Catalonia (PSUC)	507,753	18.77	n/a	25	n/a
Centrists of Catalonia (CC–UCD)	286,922	10.61	n/a	18	n/a
Republican Left of Catalonia (ERC)	240,871	8.90	n/a	14	n/a
Socialist Party of Andalusia–Andalusian Party (PSA–PA)	71,841	2.66	n/a	2	n/a
Catalan Solidarity (SC)	64,004	2.37	n/a	0	n/a
Left Nationalists (NE)	44,798	1.66	n/a	0	n/a
Unity for Socialism (CUPS)	33,086	1.22	n/a	0	n/a
New Force (FN)	27,807	1.03	n/a	0	n/a
Left Bloc for National Liberation (BEAN)	14,077	0.52	n/a	0	n/a
Communist Workers' Party of Catalonia (PCOC)	12,963	0.48	n/a	0	n/a
Communist Unity (UC)	8,198	0.30	n/a	0	n/a
Spanish Phalanx of the CNSO (FE–JONS)	6,637	0.25	n/a	0	n/a
Independent National Party (PNI)	4,741	0.18	n/a	0	n/a
Conservatives of Catalonia (CiC)	4,095	0.15	n/a	0	n/a
Blank ballots	17,960	0.66	n/a		
Total	2,705,413			135	n/a
Valid votes	2,705,413	99.50	n/a		
Invalid votes	13,475	0.50	n/a		
Votes cast / turnout	2,718,888	61.34	n/a		
Abstentions	1,713,888	38.66	n/a		
Registered voters	4,432,776				

Popular vote
CiU	27.83%
PSC–PSOE	22.43%
PSUC	18.77%
CC–UCD	10.61%
ERC	8.90%
PSA–PA	2.66%
SC	2.37%
NE	1.66%
CUPS	1.22%
FN	1.03%
Others	1.87%
Blank ballots	0.66%

Seats
CiU	31.85%
PSC–PSOE	24.44%
PSUC	18.52%
CC–UCD	13.33%
ERC	10.37%
PSA–PA	1.48%

=== Distribution by constituency ===
Constituency	CiU		PSC		PSUC		CC–UCD		ERC		PSA–PA	
Constituency	%	S	%	S	%	S	%	S	%	S	%	S
Barcelona	27.2	26	23.2	22	20.8	20	8.2	7	8.3	8	3.0	2
Girona	37.1	7	19.6	4	9.3	1	15.2	3	10.6	2	1.3	−
Lleida	28.2	5	19.3	3	10.6	1	23.4	4	12.2	2	0.7	−
Tarragona	23.6	5	20.6	4	15.1	3	19.7	4	10.4	2	1.9	−
Total	27.8	43	22.4	33	18.8	25	10.6	18	8.9	14	2.7	2

== Aftermath ==
=== Analysis ===
On a turnout of 61.3%, which was seen as high by political leaders at the time, Convergence and Union (CiU) emerged as the largest political force with 27.8% of the share and 43 seats, which came as a surprising victory over the Socialists' Party of Catalonia (PSC–PSOE) which had been widely expected to form the next regional government of Catalonia. Instead, the PSC–PSOE secured 22.4% of the vote and 33 seats, losing many votes compared to the previous 1979 general election in what was seen as an electoral punishment to the PSC's ambiguous position on the issue of Catalan nationalism—said to have cost it the support from Catalan centre-left bourgeoisie voters, losing them both to the Unified Socialist Party of Catalonia (PSUC) (which obtained 18.8% of the vote and 25 seats) and to the Republican Left of Catalonia (ERC) (8.9% of the share and 14 seats)—but also to the ongoing internal tensions between the more pro-Catalan faction made of former Socialist Party of Catalonia–Congress members and the more pro-Spanish faction from the former Catalan Socialist Federation, as well as Joan Reventós's little appeal among working class voters.

Results for the Centrists of Catalonia (CC–UCD) alliance were seen as negative, after securing only 10.6% of the vote and 18 seats when compared to the 19.3% it had obtained in the 1979 general election, in what was perceived as a tactical voting from centrist voters in favour of Jordi Pujol's CiU to prevent any chances of a Socialist—Communist government from being formed. The Socialist Party of Andalusia–Andalusian Party (PSA–PA) was able to get elected to parliament with 2.7% and 2 seats, after narrowly surpassing the 3% threshold in the province of Barcelona. Incumbent President Josep Tarradellas was said to have cast a blank ballot, after his attempts to run for re-election proved unsuccessful amid his growing mistrust of Catalan political parties.

At the national level, results were seen as a failure in the consolidation of the UCD–PSOE bipartisanship, but also as another in a row of electoral defeats for the UCD: only one year into the legislature resulting from the 1979 election, the governing party in Spain had been trounced in the Andalusian autonomy initiative referendum, had scored a humiliating result in the Basque regional election—where it lost 53.5% of its 1979 voters—and had sizeable losses in Catalonia amounting to about 226,000 out of its 513,000 votes in 1979. Eventually, these would be joined by disappointment over the dismal turnout at the 1980 Galician Statute of Autonomy referendum and further electoral setbacks in the November 1980 Senate by-elections in Almería and Seville, with the deterioration of Adolfo Suárez's public figure leading to increasing internal struggling within the party and to his resignation as Prime Minister in January 1981. The enormous losses sustained by the UCD in the 1981 Galician regional election would see the party entering into a state of crisis and decay, culminating in crushing defeats in the Andalusian regional and Spanish general elections held throughout 1982, ultimately leading to the UCD's dissolution in February 1983.

=== Government formation ===
The election results placed Jordi Pujol as the most likely candidate for the regional premiership, but the parliamentary arithmetic was complex: only a pact between CiU–PSC (76 seats), CiU–UCD–ERC (75), PSC–PSUC–ERC (72) or an unlikely CiU–PSUC (68) would guarantee a successful investiture in either of the first two ballots, with any prospective third ballot still requiring more affirmative than negative votes. The first choice—which was also Pujol's preferred one in order for a stable government to be formed—was rejected as the PSC advocated for remaining in opposition, ruling out any agreement with CiU; concurrently, both CiU and PSUC discarded any joint agreement involving each other, as CiU did not wish to pact with the Communists and the PSUC remained unwilling to grant its support to any government where it was not present. As a result, two-way negotiations with UCD and ERC ensued: while both parties were favourable to Pujol's investiture, the scope of the parliamentary support to be granted would remain a key issue; whether it would be limited to the investiture, involve a confidence and supply arrangement or a full-fledged coalition government.

UCD was willing to offer support to Pujol in exchange for CiU supporting Suárez's government in the Congress of Deputies, amid fears within CC–UCD that this could give the impression of it being a "branch office" of their party in Madrid. Concurrently, CiU was willing to let ERC into the government and parliamentary institutions, but the latter party conditioned such an entry to a CiU–PSC coalition being formed, announcing that it would only provide a "very critical" support to Pujol—limited to his investiture only—should a CiU–UCD government be formed instead. The Parliament's constitution on 10 April led to the election of Heribert Barrera from ERC as Parliament's speaker with CiU's support, and eventually to Pujol's success in the second ballot of investiture on 24 April with the support of both UCD and ERC, which had chosen to abstain in the first ballot.

Investiture; Nomination of Jordi Pujol (CDC)
Ballot →	22 April 1980	24 April 1980
Required majority →	68 out of 135	68 out of 135
Yes: • CiU (43); • CC–UCD (18) (on 24 Apr); • ERC (14) (on 24 Apr)	43 / 135	75 / 135
No: • PSC (33); • PSUC (23); • PSA–PA (2)	59 / 135	59 / 135
Abstentions: • CC–UCD (18) (on 22 Apr); • ERC (13) (on 22 Apr)	31 / 135	0 / 135
Absentees: • PSUC (1); • ERC (1) (on 22 Apr)	2 / 135	1 / 135

Despite attempts from outgoing President Tarradellas to delay Pujol's inauguration and hinder his government's powers, Pujol would be formally sworn into the office of regional premier on 8 May 1980, a post he would end up holding for the next 23 years. Pujol would form a minority government, with its members being appointed the next day. Then PSC leader Joan Reventós would later express regret at having rejected the formation of a CiU–PSC coalition because, "had Pujol's proposal been accepted, the political history of Catalonia during this period may have been another"; despite the initial expectations that Pujol's minority government would be short-lived, it would instead provide Pujol with a platform with which to boost his political stand, resulting in the establishment of an electoral hegemony that would last until 2003.

=== 1982 motion of no confidence ===
Motion of no confidence Nomination of Josep Benet (INDEP)
Ballot →	1 October 1982
Required majority →	68 out of 135
Yes: • PSUC (20); • Independent (1)	21 / 135
No: • CiU (42); • ERC (12); • Independent (2)	56 / 135
Abstentions: • PSC (32); • CC–UCD (9); • CDS (7); • PCC (3); • PSDC (1); • PSA–PA (1)	53 / 135
Absentees: • CiU (1); • PSC (1); • ERC (1); • PCC (1); • Independent (1)	5 / 135

== Bibliography ==
- Real Decreto-ley 20/1977, de 18 de marzo, sobre Normas Electorales (Royal Decree-Law 20/1977). Official State Gazette (in Spanish). 18 March 1977. BOE-A-1977-7445.
- Ley Orgánica 4/1979, de 18 de diciembre, de Estatuto de Autonomía de Cataluña (Organic Law 4/1979). Official State Gazette (in Spanish). 18 December 1979. BOE-A-1979-30178.
- Decreto de la Presidencia de la Generalidad, de 17 de enero de 1980, por el que se convocan elecciones al Parlamento de Cataluña (PDF) (Decree). Official Journal of the Government of Catalonia (in Spanish). 17 January 1980.
