= Catalan Solidarity =

Catalan Solidarity may refer to:

- Catalan Solidarity (1906)
- Catalan Solidarity (1980)
- Catalan Solidarity for Independence
