= Empar Pineda =

Spanish feminist activist

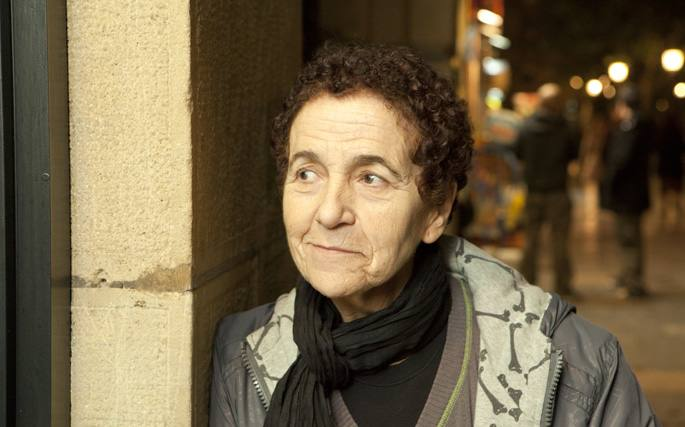
- Pineda in 2010
- Born: Empar Pineda i Erdozia; 1944 (age 81–82); Hernani, Euskadi, Spain
- Education: University of Oviedo
- Occupation: Activist
- Awards: Creu de Sant Jordi (2008)

Empar Pineda i Erdozia (born 1944) is a Spanish feminist activist, winner of the Creu de Sant Jordi in 2008.

== Biography ==
=== Childhood in the Basque Country ===
Empar Pineda was born in Hernani, Gipuzkoa in 1944, and spent her childhood at the family farmhouse with her six siblings. She was very close to her grandfather, a person who was very knowledgeable about plants and ointments – he was called a curandero – and politically aware.

I have always had a very rebellious spirit. I do not know if I inherited it from my grandfather from the hamlet. He was called El Patas, and in '36 he raised all the votes for the Socialist Party in the Urumea valley. He was also my godfather, and with him I went from farmhouse to farmhouse, accompanying him because he was a curandero. I do not know if the courage of that spirit of his came to me, but since I was a child I have always been very rebellious. When I saw that some injustice was done, I rebelled.

She was enrolled in a German nun's school, where she was required to learn English. In 1964 she completed her baccalaureate. As there was no public university in the Basque Country, she moved to Madrid, where her sister lived.

=== First years of anti-Francoist activism ===
In 1964, after finishing the higher baccalaureate, Pineda moved to Madrid to continue her studies. She participated in the anti-Francoist student movement and was banned from enrolling at the Universities of Madrid and Barcelona. She ended up enrolling at the University of Salamanca in 1964, and a little later at the University of Oviedo, where she graduated in Romance philology.

She returned to Madrid, where she began teaching Language and Literature at a branch of the Employee's Home while continuing her membership in left-wing organizations, including one called "Lenin", the Federation of Communists, and finally the Communist Movement.

An anti-Francoist militant, she was arrested by the authorities and spent some time in Martutene Prison. In the 1970s, during the transition to democracy, she moved to Barcelona. There she was the leader of the Communist Movement of Catalonia (MCC), which she represented in the Assembly of Catalonia.

In the 1977 election she was a candidate for the Province of Barcelona for Popular Unity for Socialism Candidacy, and was the head of the MCC-OEC list in the 1979 Barcelona mayoral election.

=== Feminist-lesbian struggle ===
In interviews Empar Pineda has said she discovered feminism with her colleagues from the Communist Movement of Catalonia. In addition, the United Nations proclaimed 1975 the International Women's Year. The first meetings of the Association of Friends of UNESCO were held, bringing together feminist activists who in May 1976 formed the Feminist Coordinator of Barcelona and organized the First Days of the Catalan Woman under the association's umbrella. They gathered 1,000 women at the Autonomous University of Barcelona to reflect on feminism and women's rights.

In 1977 she witnessed progress in LGBT rights and freedoms, presiding over the banner of the first Gay Pride Day in Madrid.

In 1980 she was co-founder of the Lesbian Feminist Collective of Madrid and participated in the creation of the Right to Abortion Commission, following the irruption of the Civil Guard at Los Naranjos de Sevilla planning center and the detention of its health personnel. She participated in the campaign "Yo también he abortado" (I have also aborted).

Later Pineda was co-founder of the Commission for the Right to Abortion in Madrid, spokesperson for the network Otras voces feministas (Other Feminist Voices), and director of the collection Hablan las mujeres (Women Speak) and magazines Nosotras que nos queremos tanto (We Who Love Each Other So Much) and Desde nuestra acera (From Our Sidewalk).

In 1993 she began working at the Isadora Clinic in Madrid, to which she has remained linked as a consultant since her retirement.

In 2008 she received the Creu de Sant Jordi for "her dedication sustained for so many years in defense of women's rights, from the action – as an active member of various organizations – and reflection – as a co-author of several volumes, including 'El feminismo que existe'."

In 2011, Empar Pineda and another LGBT leader, Jordi Petit, announced that they would not continue carrying the Creu de Sant Jordi as a protest against the "insensitivity" of the Generalitat in not awarding it to "any person linked to the fight against HIV/AIDS, on the 30th anniversary of the pandemic", despite the fact that, they claimed, many entities had requested it. It was also in protest of the honor being awarded to Josep Antoni Duran i Lleida, who had made "discriminatory, anti-homosexual, and transphobic statements".

As of 2018, she is an active part of the Hetaira Collective.

There is an immense task to be done against sexist violence, against the wage gap, against the minimal participation of men in domestic tasks, against the castrating work of the Church. [...] As much as they repress me, they will not make me lose pride in being the way I am and the defense of those who are like me.

== Controversies ==
In June 2008, together with Judge María Sanahuja, Pineda stood against the Organic Law Against Gender Violence for punishing violence by men towards women with greater penalties, pointing out that "there are abused men."

== Awards ==
- 2008 Creu de Sant Jordi
- 2012 Recognized as Hernaniar Bikaina (Excellent Hernani Native)
- 2013 Award for Values in Equality from the Workers' Commissions' 1st of May Foundation
