= Josep Benet =

Catalan politician, historian and publisher

Josep Benet i Morell (Cervera, April 14, 1920 - Sant Cugat del Vallès, March 24, 2008) was a Catalan politician, historian and publisher. Educated at the Escolania de Montserrat, from a very young age he participated in the Catalan nationalist movement and belonged to the Federation of Young Christians of Catalonia. One of the most prominent figures of political Catalanism in the XXth Century. As a parliamentarian, he was a member of the Committee of Twenty that drew up the preliminary draft of the Statute of Autonomy of Catalonia of 1979.

== Books ==
- 1964: Maragall i la Setmana Tràgica
- 1968: El Doctor Torras i Bages en el marc del seu temps
- 1973: Catalunya sota el règim franquista
- 1990: Exili i mort del president Companys
- 1992: El president Tarradellas en els seus textos (1954-1988)
- 1995: L'intent franquista de genocidi cultural de Catalunya
- 1998: La mort del president Companys
- 1999: Carles Rahola, afusellat
- 2003: Escrits en defensa pròpia
- 2003: Domènec Latorre, afusellat per catalanista
- 2008: De l'esperança a la desfeta (1920-1939)
- 2008: El meu jurament de 1939
- 2008: Joan Peiró, afusellat
- 2009: Manuel Carrasco i Formiguera, afusellat
