= Communist Workers' Party of Catalonia =

Communist Workers' Party of Catalonia Partido Comunista Obrero Español
- Founder: Albert Farran Oriol
- Founded: 28 October 1977
- Merged into: Communist Party of the Peoples of Spain
- Newspaper: Endavant
- Youth wing: Communist Youth Federation of Catalonia (FJCC)
- Ideology: Marxism-Leninism; Anti-revisionism; Antifascism; Republicanism; Federalism
- Political position: Far-left

Communist Workers' Party of Catalonia (Catalan: Partit Comunista Obrer de Catalunya) is a communist party in Catalonia. The party was founded in 1973 as a split from Partit Socialista Unificat de Catalunya as the Catalan branch of the Spanish Communist Workers' Party (PCOE), and was legalized on 28 October 1977. In 2000, it became a part of the Communist Party of the Peoples of Spain.

The central organ of PCOC was Endavant!, which was published monthly 1974–1999. The party's general secretary was Albert Farrán.

== History ==
Election results:

- 1980 Parliament of Catalonia elections: 12,963 votes (0.48%)
- 1984 Parliament of Catalonia elections: 2,593 votes (0.09%)

When Enrique Líster rejoined the Communist Party of Spain (PCE) in 1986, following the departure of Santiago Carrillo from PCE, major sections of PCOC returned to PSUC. PCOC fused, along with PCOE, into the Communist Party of the Peoples of Spain in 2000.
