= The Greens–Green Alternative =

The Greens–Green Alternative Els Verds–Alternativa Verda
- Founded: September 1999
- Split from: The Greens–Ecologist Confederation of Catalonia
- Headquarters: C/ Luna, 41, bjs. 17220, Sant Feliu de Guíxols
- Ideology: Ecologism; Catalan independentism
- Political position: Left-wing
- National affiliation: Catalan Solidarity for Independence (2010–15); Popular Unity Candidacy (2015–17); Together for Catalonia (2017) (2017–20); Junts (2020)
- Parliament of Catalonia: 0 / 135

Website
- www.verds-alternativaverda.org

The Greens–Green Alternative (Catalan: Els Verds–Alternativa Verda, EV–AV) is a political party based in Catalonia, founded in September 1999 by former members of The Greens–Ecologist Confederation of Catalonia (EV–CEC), after the party had split in March 1998 over the type of relationship to establish with the newly-autonomous Initiative for Catalonia (IC).

In January 2015, EV–AV joined the "Constituent Call" platform promoted by the Popular Unity Candidacy (CUP), though for the 2015 Catalan regional election they gave support to the Junts pel Sí candidacy. Ahead of the 2017 Catalan regional election the party had several of its members integrated within Together for Catalonia (JxCat)'s lists, granting its support to JxCat in subsequent elections as well. On 28 May 2019, party member Josep Puig entered Parliament replacing Josep Rull as a result of the latter's resignation to become a member of the Congress of Deputies.

== Electoral performance ==
=== Parliament of Catalonia ===
Parliament of Catalonia
Election	Votes	%	#	Seats	+/–	Leading candidate	Status in legislature
1999	8,254	0.26%	8th	0 / 135	0	Josep Puig	No seats
2003	1,886	0.06%	12th	0 / 135	0	Santiago Vilanova	No seats
2006	3,228	0.11%	13th	0 / 135	0	Santiago Vilanova	No seats
2010	Within SI			0 / 135	0	Joan Laporta	Opposition
2012	Within SI			0 / 135	0	Alfons López Tena	No seats
2017	Within JuntsxCat			0 / 135	0	Carles Puigdemont (Note: At the time of the election, Puigdemont was in self-exile in Belgium.)	Coalition (JxCat–ERC)

=== Cortes Generales ===
Cortes Generales
Election	Congress					Senate		Leading candidate	Status in legislature
Election	Votes	%	#	Seats	+/–	Seats	+/–	Leading candidate	Status in legislature
2000	11,579	0.05%	31st	0 / 350	0	0 / 208	0	Santiago Vilanova	No seats
2004	1,836	0.01%	60th	0 / 350	0	0 / 208	0	Josep Lluis Freijó	No seats
2008	2,028	0.01%	51st	0 / 350	0	0 / 208	0	Xavier García i Pujadas	No seats

Election	Catalonia						
Election	Congress					Senate	
Election	Votes	%	#	Seats	+/–	Seats	+/–
2000	11,579	0.34%	8th	0 / 46	0	0 / 16	0
2004	1,836	0.05%	14th	0 / 47	0	0 / 16	0
2008	2,028	0.05%	19th	0 / 47	0	0 / 16	0
