= Agreement of Left Nationalists =

Agreement of Left Nationalists Entesa dels Nacionalistes d'Esquerra
- Founded: 1985
- Dissolved: 1987
- Merged into: ICV
- Headquarters: Barcelona
- Ideology: Socialism; Ecologism; Catalan nationalism
- Political position: Left-wing
- Regional affiliation: Union of the Catalan Left (1986–1987)

Agreement of Left Nationalists (Catalan: Entesa dels Nacionalistes d'Esquerra, ENE) was a Catalan socialist and nationalist political party, founded in 1985 by members of the Left Nationalists (NdE), Republican Left of Catalonia (ERC) and independents. In the 1984 Catalan parliamentary election, it ran under the label Agreement of the Catalan Left (Catalan: Entesa de l'Esquerra Catalana, EEC). In the 1986 Spanish general election, it ran together with the Unified Socialist Party of Catalonia (PSUC) within the Union of the Catalan Left coalition (UEC).

ENE failed to slightly improve on NdE electoral results, eventually merging with PSUC into UEC to form Initiative for Catalonia (IC).
