= The Greens–Ecologist Confederation of Catalonia =

The Greens–Ecologist Confederation of Catalonia Els Verds–Confederació Ecologista de Catalunya
- Founded: 4 March 1994
- Dissolved: March 1998 (split); December 2001 (disorganized)
- Preceded by: The Greens; Nationalist Left Movement; Green Alternative–Ecologist Movement of Catalonia; Ecologist Alternative of Catalonia (1993–95)
- Headquarters: C/ Aribau, 26, entlo. 1. 08011, Barcelona
- Ideology: Ecologism; Catalan nationalism
- National affiliation: Initiative for Catalonia (1995–98)

The Greens–Ecologist Confederation of Catalonia (Catalan: Els Verds–Confederació Ecologista de Catalunya, EV–CEC) was an ecologist, Catalan nationalist political party in Spain, based in Catalonia. It was founded in March 1994 from the merger of The Greens, Nationalist Left Movement, Green Alternative–Ecologist Movement of Catalonia and Ecologist Alternative of Catalonia.

The party was allied to Initiative for Catalonia (IC), United Left (IU) referent in Catalonia, from 1995 to 1998, when IC broke away from IU. The party split in its assembly held on 21–22 March 1998 over the decision of whether to maintain ties with IC or not: those supportive of the agreement with IC, led by Joan Oms and Josep Puig founded The Greens–Green Option (EV–OV); whereas those advocating for an outright integration within the newly-established United and Alternative Left (EUiA), led by Ignasi Roca-Huertas would form The Greens–Green Left of Catalonia (EV–EVC). In September 1999, members from the late Green Alternative–Ecologist Movement of Catalonia would refound the party as The Greens–Green Alternative (EV–AV).

The sector remaining within the party attempted to maintain it under the EV–CEC nomenclature, joining electoral alliances with Republican Left of Catalonia (ERC) in the 1999 Spanish local and European Parliament elections, running in the 1999 Catalan regional election and allying themselves with United and Alternative Left (EUiA) ahead of the 2000 Spanish general election.

Eventually, a judicial challenge of the agreements adopted in the March 1998 assembly led to a ruling on 26 November 2001 declaring the nullity of all party's agreements and decisions taken up from that date, resulting in the party's effective dissolution and its rebranding as The Greens–Ecologist Left (EV–EE).

== Electoral performance ==
=== Parliament of Catalonia ===
Parliament of Catalonia
Election	Votes	%	#	Seats	+/–	Leading candidate	Status in legislature
1995	Within IC–EV			1 / 135	1	Rafael Ribó	Opposition
1999	22,797	0.73%	7th	0 / 135	1	Elisenda Fores	No seats
