= Communist Movement of Catalonia =

Communist Movement of Catalonia Moviment Comunista de Catalunya
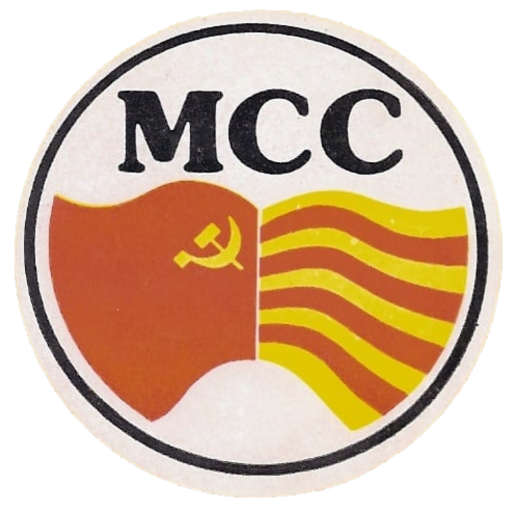
- Leader: Empar Pineda; Ignacio Álvarez Dorronsoro
- Founded: 1974
- Dissolved: 1991
- Merged into: Revolta
- Newspaper: Servir al Poble
- Youth wing: Revolutionary Youth of Catalonia
- Union affiliation: Comisiones Obreras
- Ideology: Communism; Marxism-Leninism; Catalan independence Feminism; Until 1983: Maoism
- Political position: Far-left
- National affiliation: Communist Movement

Communist Movement of Catalonia (Catalan: Moviment Comunista de Catalunya; MCC) was the federated political party of the Communist Movement (MC) in Catalonia. The MCC was founded in 1974.

== Ideology ==
Originally the MCC was a Maoist party, inspired by the Chinese Cultural Revolution, but over the years, specially after 1981-82, the organization gradually abandoned its previous ideologies (Orthodox Marxism, Leninism, Maoism) in favour of more heterodox forms of Marxism. The party was also supportive of the Feminist, Catalanist, LGBT and Insurbordinate social movements. The MCC was also highly supportive of the Catalan independence movement.

== History ==
The MCC appeared in 1974, joining the Assembly of Catalonia that same year. The MCC participated in the coalition Unity for Socialism in the first autonomic Catalan elections (1980). In 1991, after years of close collaboration, the MCC and the LCR merged and formed a new party, Izquierda Alternativa (IA). Revolta was the Catalan branch of IA. The LCR members left Revolta in 1993.
