= Unity for Socialism =

Unity for Socialism Unitat pel Socialisme
- Founded: 1980
- Dissolved: 1981
- Headquarters: Barcelona
- Ideology: Communism; Revolutionary socialism Catalanism
- Political position: Far-left
- Colors: Red

Unitat pel Socialisme election campaign poster

Unity for Socialism (Catalan: Unitat pel Socialisme) was an electoral coalition in Catalonia, Spain, contesting the 1980 Catalan parliament election. The coalition represented the main groups of the non-parliamentary left in Catalonia at the time. It was constituted by the Workers Party of Catalonia (PTC), Communist Organization of Spain (Bandera Roja) (OCE(BR)), Revolutionary Communist League (LCR) and the Communist Movement of Catalonia (MCC). Manuel Gracia Luño (general secretary of PTC) was the top candidate in the Barcelona constituency, whilst Jordi Creixans (OCE(BR)) headed the Girona list, Francisco Javier Clavería (PTC) headed the Lleida list and José Semente Moya (MCC) was the top candidate in Tarragona.

A key theme of the campaign of the coalition was the portrayal of itself as representing the authentic left-wing, as opposed to the established left-wing parties. The coalition made use of radio transmissions of its own (Radio Unitat pel Socialisme), broadcasting eleven hours daily. International participants in the election campaign included the Irish activist Bernadette Devlin (former Member of the British parliament) and the Peruvian left-wing parliamentarian Hugo Blanco.

The coalition obtained 33,086 votes (1.22%). It won no seats. For the PTC, which had promoted the coalition, the result was a backlash and the party was dissolved in the same year. Most of the votes for Unitat pel Socialisme came from the Barcelona constituency, were the coalition mustered 28,499 votes (1.36%). In Girona the coalition got 1,262 votes (0.55%), in Lleida 1,070 votes (0.67%) and in Tarragona 2,255 votes (1.01%). Amongst the comarcas of Catalonia, the coalition achieved its best result in Baix Llobregat with 4,710 votes (2%).
