= Catalan Solidarity (1980) =

Catalan Solidarity Solidaritat Catalana
- Leader: Joan Echevarria Puig
- Secretary: Celdonio Casas
- Founded: 21 February 1980
- Dissolved: 1980
- Headquarters: Gran Via de Carlos III, 130; 08028, Barcelona
- Ideology: Conservatism; Christian democracy
- Political position: Right-wing
- Colors: Crimson; Yellow

Catalan Solidarity (Catalan: Solidaritat Catalana, Spanish: Solidaridad Catalana; SC) was a political party in Catalonia founded in February 1980. The party was supported by the People's Alliance (AP) ahead of the 1980 Catalan regional election, but failed to win any seats.
