= Results of the April 2019 Spanish Congress election =

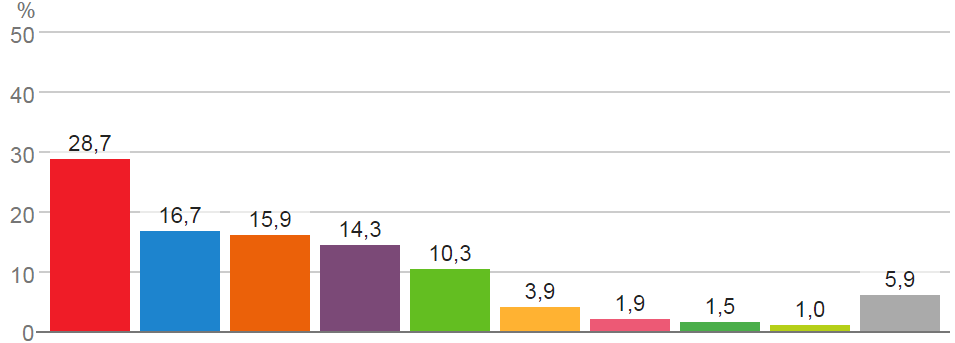
(Spain)	Main: April 2019 Spanish general election
← 2016 28 April 2019 2019 (Nov) →
Party		Votes	%	Seats
	PSOE	7,513,142	28.7%	123
	PP	4,373,653	16.7%	66
	Cs	4,155,665	15.9%	57
	Unidas Podemos	3,751,145	14.3%	42
	Vox	2,688,092	10.3%	24
	ERC–Sobiranistes	1,024,628	3.9%	15
	JxCat–Junts	500,787	1.9%	7
	EAJ/PNV	395,884	1.5%	6
	EH Bildu	259,647	1.0%	4
	Others	1,538,728	5.9%	6
Total		26,201,371	100.0%	350

This article presents the results breakdown of the election to the Congress of Deputies held in Spain on 28 April 2019. The following tables show detailed results in each of the country's 17 autonomous communities and in the autonomous cities of Ceuta and Melilla, as well as a summary of constituency and regional results.

== Nationwide ==
← Summary of the 28 April 2019 Congress of Deputies election results →
Parties and alliances	Popular vote			Seats	
Parties and alliances	Votes	%	±pp	Total	+/−
Spanish Socialist Workers' Party (PSOE)	7,513,142	28.67	+6.04	123	+38
People's Party (PP)^{1}	4,373,653	16.69	−15.88	66	−69
Citizens–Party of the Citizenry (Cs)^{1}	4,155,665	15.86	+2.88	57	+25
United We Can (Unidas Podemos)	3,751,145	14.32	−6.83	42	−29
United We Can (Podemos–IU–Equo)^{2}	2,897,419	11.06	−5.10	33	−21
In Common We Can–Let's Win the Change (ECP–Guanyem el Canvi)	615,665	2.35	−1.20	7	−5
In Common–United We Can (Podemos–EU–Mareas en Común–Equo)^{3}	238,061	0.91	−0.53	2	−3
Vox (Vox)	2,688,092	10.26	+10.06	24	+24
Republican Left of Catalonia–Sovereigntists (ERC–Sobiranistes)	1,024,628	3.91	+1.28	15	+6
Republican Left of Catalonia–Sovereigntists (ERC–Sobiranistes)	1,020,392	3.89	+1.26	15	+6
Republican Left of the Valencian Country (ERPV)	4,236	0.02	New	0	±0
Together for Catalonia–Together (JxCat–Junts)^{4}	500,787	1.91	−0.10	7	−1
Basque Nationalist Party (EAJ/PNV)	395,884	1.51	+0.32	6	+1
Animalist Party Against Mistreatment of Animals (PACMA)	328,299	1.25	+0.06	0	±0
Basque Country Gather (EH Bildu)	259,647	0.99	+0.22	4	+2
Commitment: Bloc–Initiative–Greens Equo (Compromís 2019)	173,821	0.66	New	1	+1
Canarian Coalition–Canarian Nationalist Party (CCa–PNC)	137,664	0.53	+0.20	2	+1
Free People–We Are Alternative–Pirates: Republican Front (Front Republicà)	113,807	0.43	New	0	±0
Sum Navarre (NA+)^{5}	107,619	0.41	−0.12	2	±0
Galician Nationalist Bloc (BNG)	94,433	0.36	+0.17	0	±0
Regionalist Party of Cantabria (PRC)	52,266	0.20	New	1	+1
Zero Cuts–Green Group (Recortes Cero–GV)	47,363	0.18	−0.04	0	±0
New Canaries (NCa)	36,225	0.14	New	0	±0
Act (PACT)	30,236	0.12	New	0	±0
Progressive Voices (Ara–Més–esquerra)	25,191	0.10	New	0	±0
Yes to the Future (GBai)	22,309	0.09	+0.03	0	±0
For a Fairer World (PUM+J)	21,863	0.08	New	0	±0
In Tide (En Marea)	17,899	0.07	New	0	±0
Communists (PCPE–PCPC–PCPA)	17,061	0.07	−0.04	0	±0
Communist Party of the Workers of Spain (PCTE)	14,022	0.05	New	0	±0
El Pi–Proposal for the Isles (El Pi)	11,692	0.04	New	0	±0
Andalusia by Herself (AxSí)	11,407	0.04	New	0	±0
Spanish Communist Workers' Party (PCOE)	9,130	0.03	+0.02	0	±0
Forward–The Greens (Avant/Adelante–LV)^{6}	7,332	0.03	+0.02	0	±0
Blank Seats (EB)	7,072	0.03	−0.02	0	±0
Coalition for Melilla (CpM)	6,857	0.03	New	0	±0
We Are Region (Somos Región)	4,976	0.02	New	0	±0
Humanist Party (PH)	4,495	0.02	+0.01	0	±0
We Are Valencian in Movement (UiG–Som–CUIDES)	4,473	0.02	−0.01	0	±0
Left in Positive (IZQP)	3,503	0.01	New	0	±0
Canaries Now (ANC–UP)^{7}	3,037	0.01	+0.01	0	±0
Commitment to Galicia (CxG)	2,760	0.01	New	0	±0
Sorian People's Platform (PPSO)	2,663	0.01	New	0	±0
Convergents (CNV)	2,541	0.01	New	0	±0
Regionalist Party of the Leonese Country (PREPAL)	2,190	0.01	+0.01	0	±0
Extremadurans (CEx–CREx–PREx)	2,150	0.01	New	0	±0
Riojan Party (PR+)	2,098	0.01	New	0	±0
Libertarian Party (P–LIB)	1,216	0.00	−0.01	0	±0
United Linares Independent Citizens (CILU–Linares)	1,081	0.00	New	0	±0
Andecha Astur (Andecha Astur)	932	0.00	New	0	±0
Retirees Party for the Future. Dignity and Democracy ("JF")	876	0.00	New	0	±0
Puyalón (PYLN)	835	0.00	New	0	±0
Federation of Independents of Aragon (FIA)	785	0.00	±0.00	0	±0
Spanish Phalanx of the CNSO (FE de las JONS)	646	0.00	−0.04	0	±0
Feminism8 (F8)	571	0.00	New	0	±0
European Solidarity Action Party (Solidaria)	528	0.00	New	0	±0
Plural Democracy (DPL)	504	0.00	New	0	±0
Regionalist Union of Castile and León (Unión Regionalista)	490	0.00	New	0	±0
Centered (centrados)	459	0.00	New	0	±0
Living Ourense (VOU)	335	0.00	New	0	±0
Public Defense Organization (ODP)	308	0.00	New	0	±0
European Retirees Social Democratic Party–Centre Unity (PDSJE–UdeC)	277	0.00	New	0	±0
Revolutionary Anticapitalist Left (IZAR)	257	0.00	±0.00	0	±0
Andalusian Solidary Independent Republican Party (RISA)	190	0.00	New	0	±0
XXI Convergence (C21)	73	0.00	New	0	±0
Death to the System (+MAS+)	47	0.00	New	0	±0
Union of Everyone (UdT)	28	0.00	±0.00	0	±0
Blank ballots	199,836	0.76	+0.02		
Total	26,201,371			350	±0
Valid votes	26,201,371	98.95	−0.12		
Invalid votes	276,769	1.05	+0.12		
Votes cast / turnout	26,478,140	71.76	+5.28		
Abstentions	10,420,743	28.24	−5.28		
Registered voters	36,898,883				
Sources
Footnotes: ^{1} People's Party and Citizens–Party of the Citizenry do not include results in Navarre.; ^{2} United We Can results are compared to the combined totals of United We Can and The Valencian Way in the 2016 election.; ^{3} In Common–United We Can results are compared to Podemos–Anova–EU in the 2016 election.; ^{4} Together for Catalonia–Together results are compared to Democratic Convergence of Catalonia totals in the 2016 election.; ^{5} Sum Navarre results are compared to the combined totals of People's Party and Citizens–Party of the Citizenry in Navarre in the 2016 election.; ^{6} Forward–The Greens results are compared to The Eco-pacifist Greens totals in the 2016 election.; ^{7} Canaries Now results are compared to Unity of the People totals in the 2016 election.

== Summary ==
=== Constituencies ===

Summary of constituency results in the 28 April 2019 Congress of Deputies election
Constituency	PSOE		PP		Cs		UP		Vox		ERC–Sob		Junts		PNV		EH Bildu		Compr.		CC–PNC		NA+		PRC	
Constituency	%	S	%	S	%	S	%	S	%	S	%	S	%	S	%	S	%	S	%	S	%	S	%	S	%	S
A Coruña	31.4	3	25.5	3	12.1	1	14.8	1	5.6	−																
Álava	22.4	1	13.7	−	4.0	−	17.7	1	3.2	−					22.7	1	14.0	1								
Albacete	32.0	2	22.1	1	18.7	1	10.6	−	14.5	−																
Alicante	28.3	4	19.5	3	19.4	2	13.9	2	12.6	1	0.1	−							3.4	−						
Almería	30.2	2	22.5	2	17.1	1	8.8	−	19.1	1																
Asturias	33.1	3	17.9	1	16.7	1	17.1	1	11.5	1																
Ávila	26.0	1	31.3	1	18.7	1	7.6	−	14.3	−																
Badajoz	38.5	3	20.4	1	18.5	1	9.4	−	11.0	1																
Balearic Islands	26.4	3	16.8	1	17.4	1	17.8	2	11.3	1																
Barcelona	24.7	9	5.0	1	12.0	4	16.3	6	3.6	1	23.0	8	10.2	3												
Biscay	19.9	2	7.3	−	3.1	−	17.7	2	2.3	−					34.3	3	13.4	1								
Burgos	29.3	2	24.6	1	19.8	1	12.5	−	11.1	−																
Cáceres	37.4	2	23.0	1	17.1	1	9.8	−	10.4	−																
Cádiz	31.5	3	14.9	1	19.7	2	16.6	2	13.1	1																
Cantabria	25.2	2	21.7	1	15.1	1	10.2	−	11.2	−															14.6	1
Castellón	29.5	2	20.3	1	16.3	1	13.9	1	12.0	−	0.3	−							5.3	−						
Ceuta	36.3	1	21.4	−	12.0	−	4.8	−	23.9	−																
Ciudad Real	34.3	2	23.7	1	17.3	1	9.2	−	13.7	1																
Córdoba	34.4	2	18.8	1	16.9	1	14.9	1	12.0	1																
Cuenca	35.7	2	26.8	1	13.8	−	7.9	−	14.0	−																
Gipuzkoa	18.9	1	5.0	−	2.9	−	17.3	1	1.6	−					29.0	2	23.4	2								
Girona	17.1	1	3.2	−	8.9	−	9.7	−	2.8	−	29.8	3	22.5	2												
Granada	33.9	3	18.4	1	17.4	1	13.6	1	14.1	1																
Guadalajara	29.8	1	20.1	1	18.8	1	12.3	−	16.5	−																
Huelva	37.0	2	17.0	1	16.9	1	13.0	1	12.8	−																
Huesca	33.0	1	20.1	1	19.6	1	13.7	−	10.7	−																
Jaén	39.5	3	19.6	1	15.9	1	10.6	−	12.1	−																
La Rioja	31.7	2	26.5	1	17.8	1	11.8	−	9.0	−																
Las Palmas	28.3	3	16.2	2	15.4	1	16.7	2	7.0	−											6.4	−				
León	32.8	2	23.5	1	17.5	1	12.0	−	11.5	−																
Lleida	16.7	1	4.9	−	8.5	−	8.3	−	2.7	−	33.6	2	20.7	1												
Lugo	33.2	2	33.6	2	8.9	−	10.1	−	5.7	−																
Madrid	27.3	11	18.6	7	20.9	8	16.2	6	13.9	5																
Málaga	30.8	4	17.7	2	19.5	2	14.5	2	14.0	1																
Melilla	20.7	−	24.0	1	12.9	−	3.8	−	17.2	−																
Murcia	24.8	3	23.4	2	19.5	2	10.4	1	18.6	2																
Navarre	25.8	2					18.6	1	4.8	−							12.7	−					29.3	2		
Ourense	32.9	2	34.8	2	10.7	−	8.9	−	5.2	−																
Palencia	31.3	1	29.5	1	15.9	1	9.2	−	11.7	−																
Pontevedra	32.2	3	25.0	2	11.1	1	17.5	1	4.8	−																
Salamanca	28.2	1	28.6	2	20.7	1	7.9	−	12.6	−																
Santa Cruz de Tenerife	27.3	2	14.8	1	13.9	1	14.7	1	6.1	−											19.9	2				
Segovia	28.2	1	26.9	1	20.0	1	9.7	−	12.4	−																
Seville	37.1	5	14.5	2	16.7	2	16.0	2	12.2	1																
Soria	31.7	1	26.7	1	16.3	−	8.6	−	9.3	−																
Tarragona	21.4	1	5.1	−	12.5	1	12.2	1	4.8	−	27.2	2	12.3	1												
Teruel	32.8	1	23.8	1	19.7	1	10.5	−	10.7	−																
Toledo	31.1	2	22.0	2	17.6	1	10.6	−	16.9	1																
Valencia	27.1	4	17.6	3	17.5	3	14.5	2	11.7	2	0.1	−							8.7	1						
Valladolid	28.9	2	23.3	1	20.1	1	11.7	−	13.7	1																
Zamora	31.3	1	29.6	1	16.9	1	8.3	−	11.6	−																
Zaragoza	31.3	3	18.0	1	20.9	1	14.0	1	12.7	1																
Total	28.7	123	16.7	66	15.9	57	14.3	42	10.3	24	3.9	15	1.9	7	1.5	6	1.0	4	0.7	1	0.5	2	0.4	2	0.2	1

=== Regions ===

Summary of regional results in the 28 April 2019 Congress of Deputies election
Region	PSOE		PP		Cs		UP		Vox		ERC–Sob		Junts		PNV		EH Bildu		Compr.		CC–PNC		NA+		PRC	
Region	%	S	%	S	%	S	%	S	%	S	%	S	%	S	%	S	%	S	%	S	%	S	%	S	%	S
Andalusia	34.2	24	17.2	11	17.7	11	14.3	9	13.4	6																
Aragon	31.7	5	18.9	3	20.5	3	13.6	1	12.2	1																
Asturias	33.1	3	17.9	1	16.7	1	17.1	1	11.5	1																
Balearic Islands	26.4	3	16.8	1	17.4	1	17.8	2	11.3	1																
Basque Country	19.9	4	7.4	−	3.2	−	17.6	4	2.2	−					31.0	6	16.7	4								
Canary Islands	27.8	5	15.5	3	14.7	2	15.7	3	6.6	−											13.0	2				
Cantabria	25.2	2	21.7	1	15.1	1	10.2	−	11.2	−															14.6	1
Castile and León	29.8	12	26.0	10	18.9	8	10.4	−	12.3	1																
Castilla–La Mancha	32.4	9	22.7	6	17.5	4	10.2	−	15.3	2																
Catalonia	23.2	12	4.8	1	11.6	5	14.8	7	3.6	1	24.6	15	12.1	7												
Ceuta	36.3	1	21.4	−	12.0	−	4.8	−	23.9	−																
Extremadura	38.1	5	21.4	2	18.0	2	9.5	−	10.8	1																
Galicia	32.1	10	27.4	9	11.2	2	14.5	2	5.3	−																
La Rioja	31.7	2	26.5	1	17.8	1	11.8	−	9.0	−																
Madrid	27.3	11	18.6	7	20.9	8	16.2	6	13.9	5																
Melilla	20.7	−	24.0	1	12.9	−	3.8	−	17.2	−																
Murcia	24.8	3	23.4	2	19.5	2	10.4	1	18.6	2																
Navarre	25.8	2					18.6	1	4.8	−							12.7	−					29.3	2		
Valencian Community	27.8	10	18.6	7	18.0	6	14.2	5	12.0	3	0.2	−							6.5	1						
Total	28.7	123	16.7	66	15.9	57	14.3	42	10.3	24	3.9	15	1.9	7	1.5	6	1.0	4	0.7	1	0.5	2	0.4	2	0.2	1

== Autonomous communities ==
=== Andalusia ===
← Summary of the 28 April 2019 Congress of Deputies election results in Andalusia →
Parties and alliances	Popular vote			Seats	
Parties and alliances	Votes	%	±pp	Total	+/−
Spanish Socialist Workers' Party (PSOE)	1,568,682	34.22	+3.02	24	+4
Citizens–Party of the Citizenry (Cs)	811,562	17.70	+4.11	11	+4
People's Party (PP)	787,384	17.18	−16.35	11	−12
United We Can (Podemos–IULV–CA–Equo)	654,944	14.29	−4.33	9	−2
Vox (Vox)	612,921	13.37	+13.17	6	+6
Animalist Party Against Mistreatment of Animals (PACMA)	62,027	1.35	+0.11	0	±0
Andalusia by Herself (AxSí)	11,407	0.25	New	0	±0
Zero Cuts–Green Group (Recortes Cero–GV)	7,826	0.17	±0.00	0	±0
Spanish Communist Workers' Party (PCOE)	5,645	0.12	+0.08	0	±0
Communist Party of the Andalusian People (PCPA)	4,697	0.10	−0.03	0	±0
For a Fairer World (PUM+J)	4,326	0.09	New	0	±0
Act (PACT)	3,567	0.08	New	0	±0
Communist Party of the Workers of Spain (PCTE)	2,278	0.05	New	0	±0
Blank Seats (EB)	1,324	0.03	+0.01	0	±0
United Linares Independent Citizens (CILU–Linares)	1,081	0.02	New	0	±0
Retirees Party for the Future. Dignity and Democracy ("JF")	876	0.02	New	0	±0
Revolutionary Anticapitalist Left (IZAR)	257	0.01	−0.01	0	±0
Andalusian Solidary Independent Republican Party (RISA)	190	0.00	New	0	±0
Blank ballots	43,084	0.94	+0.05		
Total	4,584,078			61	±0
Valid votes	4,584,078	98.68	−0.26		
Invalid votes	61,295	1.32	+0.26		
Votes cast / turnout	4,645,373	70.78	+4.73		
Abstentions	1,917,532	29.22	−4.73		
Registered voters	6,562,905				

=== Aragon ===
← Summary of the 28 April 2019 Congress of Deputies election results in Aragon →
Parties and alliances	Popular vote			Seats	
Parties and alliances	Votes	%	±pp	Total	+/−
Spanish Socialist Workers' Party (PSOE)	240,540	31.74	+6.92	5	+1
Citizens–Party of the Citizenry (Cs)	155,576	20.53	+4.32	3	+2
People's Party (PP)	143,242	18.90	−16.91	3	−3
United We Can (Podemos–IU–Equo)	102,930	13.58	−6.16	1	−1
Vox (Vox)	92,388	12.19	+11.90	1	+1
Animalist Party Against Mistreatment of Animals (PACMA)	6,934	0.92	+0.02	0	±0
Blank Seats (EB)	3,372	0.44	−0.09	0	±0
Zero Cuts–Green Group (Recortes Cero–GV)	1,825	0.24	+0.03	0	±0
For a Fairer World (PUM+J)	993	0.13	New	0	±0
Puyalón (PYLN)	835	0.11	New	0	±0
Federation of Independents of Aragon (FIA)	785	0.10	+0.02	0	±0
Communist Party of the Peoples of Spain (PCPE)	765	0.10	−0.04	0	±0
Communist Party of the Workers of Spain (PCTE)	589	0.08	New	0	±0
Death to the System (+MAS+)	47	0.01	New	0	±0
Union of Everyone (UdT)	28	0.00	−0.01	0	±0
Blank ballots	6,955	0.92	+0.06		
Total	757,804			13	±0
Valid votes	757,804	98.93	−0.20		
Invalid votes	8,202	1.07	+0.20		
Votes cast / turnout	766,006	75.20	+5.28		
Abstentions	252,603	24.80	−5.28		
Registered voters	1,018,609				

=== Asturias ===
← Summary of the 28 April 2019 Congress of Deputies election results in Asturias →
Parties and alliances	Popular vote			Seats	
Parties and alliances	Votes	%	±pp	Total	+/−
Spanish Socialist Workers' Party (PSOE)	207,586	33.13	+8.26	3	+1
People's Party–Forum (PP–Foro)	112,180	17.90	−17.35	1	−2
United We Can (Podemos–IX–Equo)	107,426	17.14	−6.71	1	−1
Citizens–Party of the Citizenry (Cs)	104,688	16.71	+4.11	1	±0
Vox (Vox)	72,018	11.49	+11.25	1	+1
Animalist Party Against Mistreatment of Animals (PACMA)	6,670	1.06	−0.02	0	±0
Act (PACT)	4,554	0.73	New	0	±0
Communist Party of the Workers of Spain (PCTE)	1,359	0.22	New	0	±0
Zero Cuts–Green Group (Recortes Cero–GV)	1,133	0.18	±0.00	0	±0
Andecha Astur (Andecha Astur)	932	0.15	New	0	±0
For a Fairer World (PUM+J)	777	0.12	New	0	±0
Humanist Party (PH)	480	0.08	+0.01	0	±0
Blank ballots	6,858	1.09	+0.19		
Total	626,661			7	−1
Valid votes	626,661	98.90	−0.14		
Invalid votes	6,940	1.10	+0.14		
Votes cast / turnout	633,601	65.02	+3.93		
Abstentions	340,890	34.98	−3.93		
Registered voters	974,491				

=== Balearic Islands ===
← Summary of the 28 April 2019 Congress of Deputies election results in the Balearic Islands →
Parties and alliances	Popular vote			Seats	
Parties and alliances	Votes	%	±pp	Total	+/−
Spanish Socialist Workers' Party (PSOE)	136,698	26.36	+6.27	3	+1
United We Can (Podemos–EUIB)	92,477	17.84	−7.57	2	±0
Citizens–Party of the Citizenry (Cs)	90,340	17.42	+2.85	1	±0
People's Party (PP)	87,352	16.85	−18.23	1	−2
Vox (Vox)	58,567	11.30	New	1	+1
Progressive Voices (Ara–Més–esquerra)	25,191	4.86	New	0	±0
El Pi–Proposal for the Isles (El Pi)	11,692	2.25	New	0	±0
Animalist Party Against Mistreatment of Animals (PACMA)	8,864	1.71	+0.15	0	±0
Zero Cuts–Green Group (Recortes Cero–GV)	1,197	0.23	−0.12	0	±0
Act (PACT)	796	0.15	New	0	±0
For a Fairer World (PUM+J)	686	0.13	New	0	±0
Blank ballots	4,647	0.90	−0.01		
Total	518,507			8	±0
Valid votes	518,507	98.93	−0.08		
Invalid votes	5,594	1.07	+0.08		
Votes cast / turnout	524,101	65.37	+4.64		
Abstentions	277,620	34.63	−4.64		
Registered voters	801,721				

=== Basque Country ===
← Summary of the 28 April 2019 Congress of Deputies election results in the Basque Country →
Parties and alliances	Popular vote			Seats	
Parties and alliances	Votes	%	±pp	Total	+/−
Basque Nationalist Party (EAJ/PNV)	395,884	31.01	+6.15	6	+1
Socialist Party of the Basque Country–Basque Country Left (PSE–EE (PSOE))	253,989	19.90	+5.67	4	+1
United We Can (Podemos–IU–Equo Berdeak)	224,505	17.59	−11.49	4	−2
Basque Country Gather (EH Bildu)	212,882	16.68	+3.40	4	+2
People's Party (PP)	95,041	7.45	−5.42	0	−2
Citizens–Party of the Citizenry (Cs)	40,366	3.16	−0.37	0	±0
Vox (Vox)	28,230	2.21	+2.13	0	±0
Animalist Party Against Mistreatment of Animals (PACMA)	11,227	0.88	+0.07	0	±0
Zero Cuts–Green Group (Recortes Cero–GV)	2,306	0.18	−0.08	0	±0
For a Fairer World (PUM+J)	1,611	0.13	New	0	±0
Communist Party of the Workers of the Basque Country (PCTE/ELAK)	1,151	0.09	New	0	±0
Blank Seats (EB/AZ)	678	0.05	−0.04	0	±0
European Solidarity Action Party (Solidaria)	528	0.04	New	0	±0
Blank ballots	8,054	0.63	−0.04		
Total	1,276,452			18	±0
Valid votes	1,276,452	99.30	−0.02		
Invalid votes	9,036	0.70	+0.02		
Votes cast / turnout	1,285,488	71.78	+6.61		
Abstentions	505,496	28.22	−6.61		
Registered voters	1,790,984				

=== Canary Islands ===
← Summary of the 28 April 2019 Congress of Deputies election results in the Canary Islands →
Parties and alliances	Popular vote			Seats	
Parties and alliances	Votes	%	±pp	Total	+/−
Spanish Socialist Workers' Party (PSOE)	295,474	27.83	+5.31	5	+2
United We Can (Podemos–IU–Equo)	166,911	15.72	−4.55	3	±0
People's Party (PP)	164,804	15.53	−18.52	3	−3
Citizens–Party of the Citizenry (Cs)	155,682	14.67	+2.64	2	±0
Canarian Coalition–Canarian Nationalist Party (CCa–PNC)	137,664	12.97	+4.98	2	+1
Vox (Vox)	69,614	6.56	+6.47	0	±0
New Canaries (NCa)	36,225	3.41	New	0	±0
Animalist Party Against Mistreatment of Animals (PACMA)	17,826	1.68	+0.15	0	±0
Canaries Now (ANC–UP)^{1}	3,037	0.29	+0.22	0	±0
Zero Cuts–Green Group (Recortes Cero–GV)	2,651	0.25	−0.05	0	±0
Communist Party of the Canarian People (PCPC)	1,486	0.14	−0.02	0	±0
For a Fairer World (PUM+J)	1,419	0.13	New	0	±0
Feminism8 (F8)	571	0.05	New	0	±0
Humanist Party (PH)	559	0.05	±0.00	0	±0
Blank ballots	7,613	0.72	+0.08		
Total	1,061,536			15	±0
Valid votes	1,061,536	98.81	−0.01		
Invalid votes	12,837	1.19	+0.01		
Votes cast / turnout	1,074,373	62.46	+3.35		
Abstentions	645,709	37.54	−3.35		
Registered voters	1,720,082				
Sources
Footnotes: ^{1} Canaries Now results are compared to Unity of the People totals in the 2016 election.

=== Cantabria ===
← Summary of the 28 April 2019 Congress of Deputies election results in Cantabria →
Parties and alliances	Popular vote			Seats	
Parties and alliances	Votes	%	±pp	Total	+/−
Spanish Socialist Workers' Party (PSOE)	90,534	25.21	+1.69	2	+1
People's Party (PP)	77,902	21.69	−19.86	1	−1
Citizens–Party of the Citizenry (Cs)	54,361	15.14	+0.74	1	±0
Regionalist Party of Cantabria (PRC)	52,266	14.55	New	1	+1
Vox (Vox)	40,139	11.18	+10.97	0	±0
United We Can (Podemos–IU–Equo)	36,784	10.24	−7.49	0	−1
Animalist Party Against Mistreatment of Animals (PACMA)	3,049	0.85	−0.15	0	±0
Blank Seats (EB)	427	0.12	−0.06	0	±0
Zero Cuts–Green Group (Recortes Cero–GV)	332	0.09	−0.05	0	±0
Communist Party of the Peoples of Spain (PCPE)	286	0.08	−0.06	0	±0
For a Fairer World (PUM+J)	274	0.08	New	0	±0
Communist Party of the Workers of Spain (PCTE)	260	0.07	New	0	±0
Libertarian Party (P–LIB)	187	0.05	+0.01	0	±0
Blank ballots	2,303	0.64	−0.09		
Total	359,104			5	±0
Valid votes	359,104	98.95	+0.06		
Invalid votes	3,806	1.05	−0.06		
Votes cast / turnout	362,910	72.38	+3.86		
Abstentions	138,501	27.62	−3.86		
Registered voters	501,411				

=== Castile and León ===
← Summary of the 28 April 2019 Congress of Deputies election results in Castile and León →
Parties and alliances	Popular vote			Seats	
Parties and alliances	Votes	%	±pp	Total	+/−
Spanish Socialist Workers' Party (PSOE)	453,339	29.79	+6.64	12	+3
People's Party (PP)	395,866	26.01	−18.26	10	−8
Citizens–Party of the Citizenry (Cs)	287,468	18.89	+4.74	8	+7
Vox (Vox)	186,882	12.28	+12.09	1	+1
United We Can (Podemos–IU–Equo)	158,535	10.42	−5.16	0	−3
Animalist Party Against Mistreatment of Animals (PACMA)	11,319	0.74	+0.03	0	±0
Zero Cuts–Green Group–PCAS–TC (Recortes Cero–GV–PCAS–TC)	2,701	0.18	±0.00	0	±0
Sorian People's Platform (PPSO)	2,663	0.18	New	0	±0
For a Fairer World (PUM+J)	2,428	0.16	New	0	±0
Regionalist Party of the Leonese Country (PREPAL)	2,190	0.14	+0.09	0	±0
Communist Party of the Workers of Spain (PCTE)	1,789	0.12	New	0	±0
Act (PACT)	623	0.04	New	0	±0
Regionalist Union of Castile and León (Unión Regionalista)	490	0.03	New	0	±0
Centered (centrados)	459	0.03	New	0	±0
Spanish Phalanx of the CNSO (FE de las JONS)	424	0.03	−0.05	0	±0
Communist Party of the Peoples of Spain (PCPE)	313	0.02	−0.09	0	±0
Spanish Communist Workers' Party (PCOE)	184	0.01	New	0	±0
Blank ballots	14,032	0.92	+0.12		
Total	1,521,705			31	±0
Valid votes	1,521,705	98.69	−0.16		
Invalid votes	20,252	1.31	+0.16		
Votes cast / turnout	1,541,957	72.87	+4.08		
Abstentions	574,103	27.13	−4.08		
Registered voters	2,116,060				

=== Castilla–La Mancha ===
← Summary of the 28 April 2019 Congress of Deputies election results in Castilla–La Mancha →
Parties and alliances	Popular vote			Seats	
Parties and alliances	Votes	%	±pp	Total	+/−
Spanish Socialist Workers' Party (PSOE)	384,461	32.38	+5.10	9	+2
People's Party (PP)	269,125	22.66	−20.07	6	−6
Citizens–Party of the Citizenry (Cs)	207,530	17.48	+4.44	4	+4
Vox (Vox)	181,444	15.28	+15.12	2	+2
United We Can (Podemos–IU–Equo)	120,747	10.17	−4.57	0	−2
Animalist Party Against Mistreatment of Animals (PACMA)	11,088	0.93	+0.20	0	±0
Zero Cuts–Green Group–PCAS–TC (Recortes Cero–GV–PCAS–TC)	2,026	0.17	+0.02	0	±0
For a Fairer World (PUM+J)	1,226	0.10	New	0	±0
Spanish Communist Workers' Party (PCOE)	325	0.03	+0.02	0	±0
European Retirees Social Democratic Party–Centre Unity (PDSJE–UdeC)	277	0.02	New	0	±0
Communist Party of the Workers of Spain (PCTE)	266	0.02	New	0	±0
Communist Party of the Peoples of Spain (PCPE)	224	0.02	−0.04	0	±0
Libertarian Party (P–LIB)	56	0.00	New	0	±0
Blank ballots	8,663	0.73	+0.10		
Total	1,187,458			21	±0
Valid votes	1,187,458	98.61	−0.28		
Invalid votes	16,696	1.39	+0.28		
Votes cast / turnout	1,204,154	76.57	+4.79		
Abstentions	368,410	23.43	−4.79		
Registered voters	1,572,564				

=== Catalonia ===
← Summary of the 28 April 2019 Congress of Deputies election results in Catalonia →
Parties and alliances	Popular vote			Seats	
Parties and alliances	Votes	%	±pp	Total	+/−
Republican Left of Catalonia–Sovereigntists (ERC–Sobiranistes)	1,020,392	24.61	+6.43	15	+6
Socialists' Party of Catalonia (PSC–PSOE)	962,257	23.21	+7.11	12	+5
In Common We Can–Let's Win the Change (ECP–Guanyem el Canvi)	615,665	14.85	−9.68	7	−5
Together for Catalonia–Together (JxCat–Junts)^{1}	500,787	12.08	−1.82	7	−1
Citizens–Party of the Citizenry (Cs)	479,374	11.56	+0.62	5	±0
People's Party (PP)	200,841	4.84	−8.52	1	−5
Vox (Vox)	148,844	3.59	+3.58	1	+1
Free People–We Are Alternative–Pirates: Republican Front (Front Republicà)	113,807	2.74	New	0	±0
Animalist Party Against Mistreatment of Animals (PACMA)	63,895	1.54	−0.18	0	±0
Zero Cuts–Green Group (Recortes Cero–GV)	6,944	0.17	−0.11	0	±0
Communist Party of the Catalan People (PCPC)	3,373	0.08	−0.05	0	±0
Left in Positive (IZQP)	2,791	0.07	New	0	±0
Convergents (CNV)	2,541	0.06	New	0	±0
Communist Party of the Workers of Catalonia (PCTC)	2,353	0.06	New	0	±0
For a Fairer World (PUM+J)	417	0.01	New	0	±0
Blank ballots	22,282	0.54	−0.29		
Total	4,146,563			48	+1
Valid votes	4,146,563	99.51	+0.18		
Invalid votes	20,609	0.49	−0.18		
Votes cast / turnout	4,167,172	74.57	+11.15		
Abstentions	1,420,973	25.43	−11.15		
Registered voters	5,588,145				
Sources
Footnotes: ^{1} Together for Catalonia–Together results are compared to Democratic Convergence of Catalonia totals in the 2016 election.

=== Extremadura ===
← Summary of the 28 April 2019 Congress of Deputies election results in Extremadura →
Parties and alliances	Popular vote			Seats	
Parties and alliances	Votes	%	±pp	Total	+/−
Spanish Socialist Workers' Party (PSOE)	250,180	38.07	+3.53	5	+1
People's Party (PP)	140,473	21.38	−18.52	2	−3
Citizens–Party of the Citizenry (Cs)	118,035	17.96	+7.42	2	+2
Vox (Vox)	70,793	10.77	+10.60	1	+1
United We Can (Podemos–IU–Equo)	62,544	9.52	−3.56	0	−1
Animalist Party Against Mistreatment of Animals (PACMA)	4,662	0.71	−0.02	0	±0
Extremadurans (CEx–CREx–PREx)	2,150	0.33	New	0	±0
Act (PACT)	1,488	0.23	New	0	±0
Zero Cuts–Green Group (Recortes Cero–GV)	856	0.13	−0.04	0	±0
For a Fairer World (PUM+J)	442	0.07	New	0	±0
Public Defense Organization (ODP)	308	0.05	New	0	±0
Blank ballots	5,194	0.79	+0.10		
Total	657,125			10	±0
Valid votes	657,125	98.37	−0.26		
Invalid votes	10,873	1.63	+0.26		
Votes cast / turnout	667,998	74.17	+5.54		
Abstentions	232,604	25.83	−5.54		
Registered voters	900,602				

=== Galicia ===
← Summary of the 28 April 2019 Congress of Deputies election results in Galicia →
Parties and alliances	Popular vote			Seats	
Parties and alliances	Votes	%	±pp	Total	+/−
Socialists' Party of Galicia (PSdeG–PSOE)	528,195	32.09	+9.88	10	+4
People's Party (PP)	451,300	27.42	−14.11	9	−3
In Common–United We Can (Podemos–EU–Mareas en Común–Equo)^{1}	238,061	14.46	−7.72	2	−3
Citizens–Party of the Citizenry (Cs)	184,045	11.18	+2.56	2	+2
Galician Nationalist Bloc (BNG)	94,433	5.74	+2.85	0	±0
Vox (Vox)	87,047	5.29	+5.22	0	±0
In Tide (En Marea)	17,899	1.09	New	0	±0
Animalist Party Against Mistreatment of Animals (PACMA)	17,213	1.05	−0.03	0	±0
Zero Cuts–Green Group (Recortes Cero–GV)	2,846	0.17	−0.08	0	±0
Commitment to Galicia (CxG)	2,760	0.17	New	0	±0
Spanish Communist Workers' Party (PCOE)	1,814	0.11	New	0	±0
Communist Party of the Workers of Galicia (PCTG)	1,648	0.10	New	0	±0
Blank Seats (EB)	886	0.05	±0.00	0	±0
Living Ourense (VOU)	335	0.02	New	0	±0
For a Fairer World (PUM+J)	213	0.01	New	0	±0
XXI Convergence (C21)	73	0.00	New	0	±0
Blank ballots	17,282	1.05	+0.11		
Total	1,646,050			23	±0
Valid votes	1,646,050	98.57	−0.14		
Invalid votes	23,819	1.43	+0.14		
Votes cast / turnout	1,669,869	61.87	+3.11		
Abstentions	1,029,254	38.13	−3.11		
Registered voters	2,699,123				
Sources
Footnotes: ^{1} In Common–United We Can results are compared to Podemos–Anova–EU totals in the 2016 election.

=== La Rioja ===
← Summary of the 28 April 2019 Congress of Deputies election results in La Rioja →
Parties and alliances	Popular vote			Seats	
Parties and alliances	Votes	%	±pp	Total	+/−
Spanish Socialist Workers' Party (PSOE)	57,307	31.69	+7.40	2	+1
People's Party (PP)	47,947	26.51	−16.10	1	−1
Citizens–Party of the Citizenry (Cs)	32,181	17.80	+3.82	1	+1
United We Can (Podemos–IU–Equo)	21,331	11.80	−4.83	0	−1
Vox (Vox)	16,255	8.99	+8.78	0	±0
Riojan Party (PR+)	2,098	1.16	New	0	±0
Animalist Party Against Mistreatment of Animals (PACMA)	1,394	0.77	−0.01	0	±0
Blank Seats (EB)	385	0.21	+0.03	0	±0
Zero Cuts–Green Group (Recortes Cero–GV)	275	0.15	−0.03	0	±0
For a Fairer World (PUM+J)	199	0.11	New	0	±0
Blank ballots	1,460	0.81	+0.10		
Total	180,832			4	±0
Valid votes	180,832	98.63	−0.27		
Invalid votes	2,512	1.37	+0.27		
Votes cast / turnout	183,344	73.38	+2.76		
Abstentions	66,495	26.62	−2.76		
Registered voters	249,839				

=== Madrid ===
← Summary of the 28 April 2019 Congress of Deputies election results in Madrid →
Parties and alliances	Popular vote			Seats	
Parties and alliances	Votes	%	±pp	Total	+/−
Spanish Socialist Workers' Party (PSOE)	1,031,534	27.27	+7.70	11	+4
Citizens–Party of the Citizenry (Cs)	792,203	20.95	+3.16	8	+2
People's Party (PP)	705,119	18.64	−19.61	7	−8
United We Can (Podemos–IU–Equo)	613,911	16.23	−5.06	6	−2
Vox (Vox)	524,176	13.86	+13.38	5	+5
Animalist Party Against Mistreatment of Animals (PACMA)	50,909	1.35	+0.22	0	±0
Act (PACT)	19,208	0.51	New	0	±0
Zero Cuts–Green Group–PCAS–TC (Recortes Cero–GV–PCAS–TC)	7,512	0.20	−0.01	0	±0
For a Fairer World (PUM+J)	5,221	0.14	New	0	±0
Humanist Party (PH)	3,456	0.09	+0.03	0	±0
Communist Party of the Workers of Spain (PCTE)	2,329	0.06	New	0	±0
Communist Party of the Peoples of Spain (PCPE)	2,038	0.05	−0.04	0	±0
Blank ballots	24,631	0.65	+0.13		
Total	3,782,247			37	+1
Valid votes	3,782,247	99.16	−0.16		
Invalid votes	32,112	0.84	+0.16		
Votes cast / turnout	3,814,359	75.46	+4.65		
Abstentions	1,240,596	24.54	−4.65		
Registered voters	5,054,955				

=== Murcia ===
← Summary of the 28 April 2019 Congress of Deputies election results in Murcia →
Parties and alliances	Popular vote			Seats	
Parties and alliances	Votes	%	±pp	Total	+/−
Spanish Socialist Workers' Party (PSOE)	190,540	24.77	+4.46	3	+1
People's Party (PP)	180,163	23.43	−23.25	2	−3
Citizens–Party of the Citizenry (Cs)	150,289	19.54	+3.85	2	±0
Vox (Vox)	143,234	18.62	+18.25	2	+2
United We Can (Podemos–IU–Equo)	80,053	10.41	−4.10	1	±0
Animalist Party Against Mistreatment of Animals (PACMA)	10,611	1.38	+0.23	0	±0
We Are Region (Somos Región)	4,976	0.65	New	0	±0
Zero Cuts–Green Group (Recortes Cero–GV)	1,406	0.18	±0.00	0	±0
Spanish Communist Workers' Party (PCOE)	1,162	0.15	New	0	±0
Left in Positive (IZQP)	712	0.09	New	0	±0
Communist Party of the Peoples of Spain (PCPE)	663	0.09	±0.00	0	±0
Plural Democracy (DPL)	504	0.07	New	0	±0
Blank ballots	4,771	0.62	+0.10		
Total	769,084			10	±0
Valid votes	769,084	98.93	−0.24		
Invalid votes	8,339	1.07	+0.24		
Votes cast / turnout	777,423	73.53	+3.95		
Abstentions	279,873	26.47	−3.95		
Registered voters	1,057,296				

=== Navarre ===
← Summary of the 28 April 2019 Congress of Deputies election results in Navarre →
Parties and alliances	Popular vote			Seats	
Parties and alliances	Votes	%	±pp	Total	+/−
Sum Navarre (NA+)^{1}	107,619	29.32	−8.69	2	±0
Spanish Socialist Workers' Party (PSOE)	94,551	25.76	+8.41	2	+1
United We Can (Podemos–IU–Equo–Batzarre)	68,393	18.64	−9.68	1	−1
Basque Country Gather (EH Bildu)	46,765	12.74	+3.38	0	±0
Yes to the Future (GBai)	22,309	6.08	+1.80	0	±0
Vox (Vox)	17,771	4.84	New	0	±0
Animalist Party Against Mistreatment of Animals (PACMA)	3,325	0.91	+0.09	0	±0
Zero Cuts–Green Group (Recortes Cero–GV)	1,295	0.35	+0.03	0	±0
For a Fairer World (PUM+J)	1,203	0.33	New	0	±0
Blank ballots	3,767	1.03	±0.00		
Total	366,998			5	±0
Valid votes	366,998	99.00	±0.00		
Invalid votes	3,708	1.00	±0.00		
Votes cast / turnout	370,706	72.53	+5.13		
Abstentions	140,379	27.47	−5.13		
Registered voters	511,085				
Sources
Footnotes: ^{1} Sum Navarre results are compared to the combined totals of Navarrese People's Union–People's Party and Citizens–Party of the Citizenry in the 2016 election.

=== Valencian Community ===
← Summary of the 28 April 2019 Congress of Deputies election results in the Valencian Community →
Parties and alliances	Popular vote			Seats	
Parties and alliances	Votes	%	±pp	Total	+/−
Spanish Socialist Workers' Party (PSOE)	746,486	27.78	+6.99	10	+4
People's Party (PP)	498,680	18.56	−16.88	7	−6
Citizens–Party of the Citizenry (Cs)	483,068	17.98	+3.02	6	+1
United We Can (Podemos–EUPV)^{1}	382,798	14.24	−11.20	5	−4
Vox (Vox)	322,870	12.01	+11.78	3	+3
Commitment: Bloc–Initiative–Greens Equo (Compromís 2019)	173,821	6.47	New	1	+1
Animalist Party Against Mistreatment of Animals (PACMA)	37,286	1.39	+0.13	0	±0
Forward–The Greens (Avant/Adelante–LV)^{2}	7,332	0.27	+0.15	0	±0
We Are Valencian in Movement (UiG–Som–CUIDES)	4,473	0.17	−0.09	0	±0
Republican Left of the Valencian Country (ERPV)	4,236	0.16	New	0	±0
Zero Cuts–Green Group (Recortes Cero–GV)	3,976	0.15	−0.03	0	±0
Communist Party of the Peoples of Spain (PCPE)	3,216	0.12	−0.02	0	±0
Libertarian Party (P–LIB)	973	0.04	±0.00	0	±0
For a Fairer World (PUM+J)	302	0.01	New	0	±0
Spanish Phalanx of the CNSO (FE de las JONS)	222	0.01	−0.06	0	±0
Blank ballots	17,679	0.66	+0.07		
Total	2,687,418			32	−1
Valid votes	2,687,418	98.92	−0.21		
Invalid votes	29,361	1.08	+0.21		
Votes cast / turnout	2,716,779	74.29	+1.92		
Abstentions	940,419	25.71	−1.92		
Registered voters	3,657,198				
Sources
Footnotes: ^{1} United We Can results are compared to The Valencian Way totals in the 2016 election.; ^{2} Forward–The Greens results are compared to The Eco-pacifist Greens totals in the 2016 election.

== Autonomous cities ==
=== Ceuta ===
← Summary of the 28 April 2019 Congress of Deputies election results in Ceuta →
Parties and alliances	Popular vote			Seats	
Parties and alliances	Votes	%	±pp	Total	+/−
Spanish Socialist Workers' Party (PSOE)	13,800	36.32	+13.70	1	+1
Vox (Vox)	9,092	23.93	+23.48	0	±0
People's Party (PP)	8,147	21.44	−30.42	0	−1
Citizens–Party of the Citizenry (Cs)	4,546	11.97	+0.46	0	±0
United We Can (Podemos–IU–Equo)	1,838	4.84	−6.01	0	±0
Zero Cuts–Green Group (Recortes Cero–GV)	157	0.41	+0.03	0	±0
For a Fairer World (PUM+J)	87	0.23	New	0	±0
Blank ballots	324	0.85	−0.17		
Total	37,991			1	±0
Valid votes	37,991	98.81	−0.05		
Invalid votes	459	1.19	+0.05		
Votes cast / turnout	38,450	61.44	+10.79		
Abstentions	24,130	38.56	−10.79		
Registered voters	62,580				

=== Melilla ===
← Summary of the 28 April 2019 Congress of Deputies election results in Melilla →
Parties and alliances	Popular vote			Seats	
Parties and alliances	Votes	%	±pp	Total	+/−
People's Party (PP)	8,087	23.96	−25.90	1	±0
Spanish Socialist Workers' Party (PSOE)	6,989	20.70	−4.39	0	±0
Coalition for Melilla (CpM)	6,857	20.31	New	0	±0
Vox (Vox)	5,807	17.20	New	0	±0
Citizens–Party of the Citizenry (Cs)	4,351	12.89	+0.53	0	±0
United We Can (Podemos–IU–Equo)	1,292	3.83	−6.00	0	±0
Zero Cuts–Green Group (Recortes Cero–GV)	99	0.29	+0.13	0	±0
For a Fairer World (PUM+J)	39	0.12	New	0	±0
Blank ballots	237	0.70	−0.29		
Total	33,758			1	±0
Valid votes	33,758	99.06	+0.38		
Invalid votes	319	0.94	−0.38		
Votes cast / turnout	34,077	57.53	+9.98		
Abstentions	25,156	42.47	−9.98		
Registered voters	59,233				
