= Jordi Xuclà =

Spanish lawyer, academic and politician

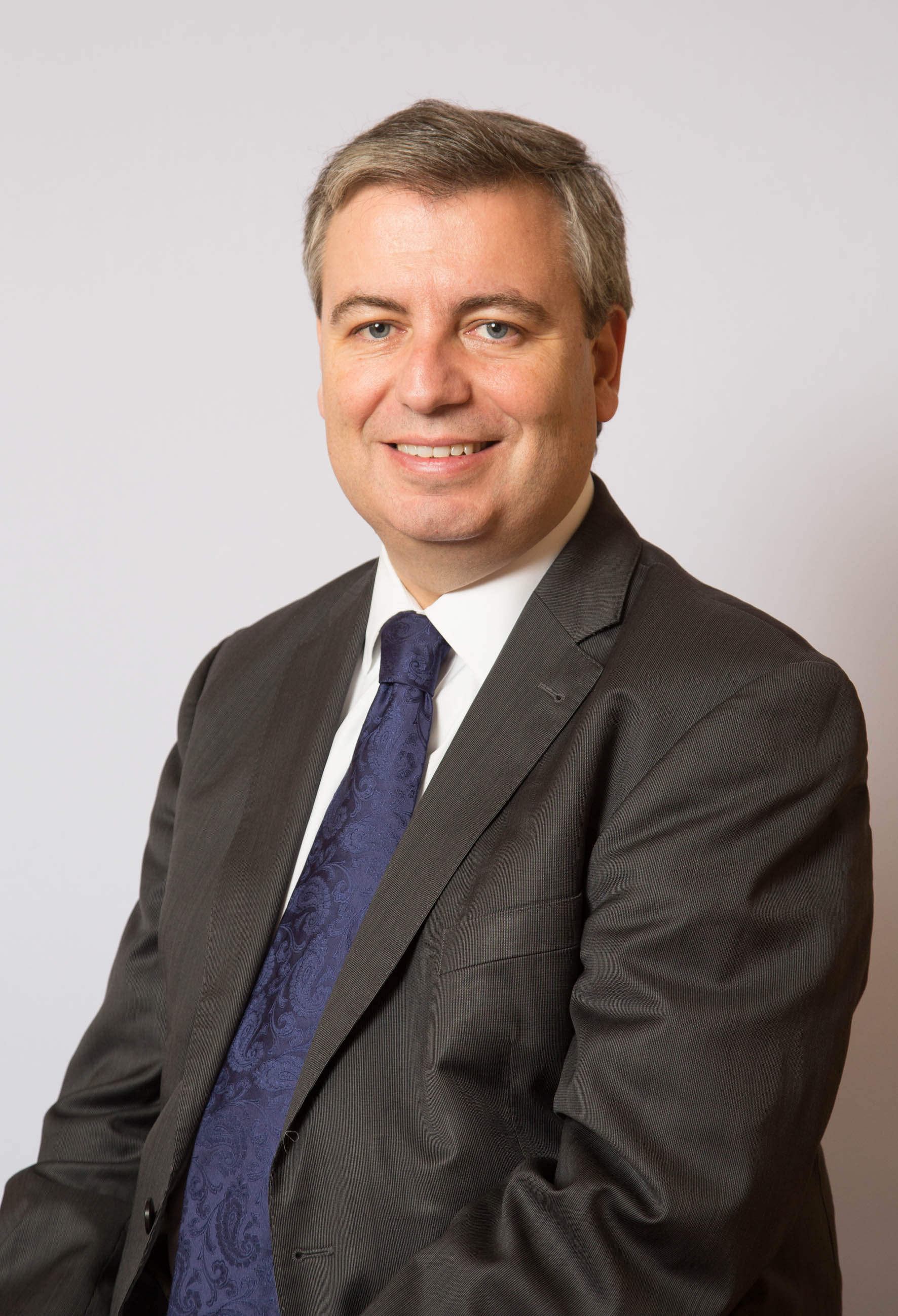
- Xuclà in November 2015

Member of the Congress of Deputies of Spain
- In office 25 March 2004 – 5 March 2019
- Constituency: Girona

Member of the Senate of Spain
- In office 12 March 2000 – 20 January 2004
- Constituency: Girona

Personal details
- Born: Jordi Xuclà i Costa; 13 May 1973 (age 53) Olot, Catalonia, Spain
- Citizenship: Spanish
- Party: Catalan European Democratic Party
- Education: University of Girona
- Occupation: Lawyer, academic

Jordi Xuclà i Costa (born 13 May 1973) is a Spanish lawyer, academic and politician from Catalonia. He is a former member of the Congress of Deputies of Spain and the Senate of Spain.

== Early life and family ==
Xuclà was born on 13 May 1973 in Olot, Catalonia. He is the son of an industrialist who was a supporter of Jordi Pujol. His brother was a member of the Socialists' Party of Catalonia (PSC). Xuclà has a degree in law from the University of Girona, a diploma in public law and a master's degree in security and foreign policy.

Xuclà joined the Democratic Convergence of Catalonia (CDC) in 1989 and was secretary-general (1998-00) and president (2000-02) of the Nationalist Youth of Catalonia (JNC).

== Career ==
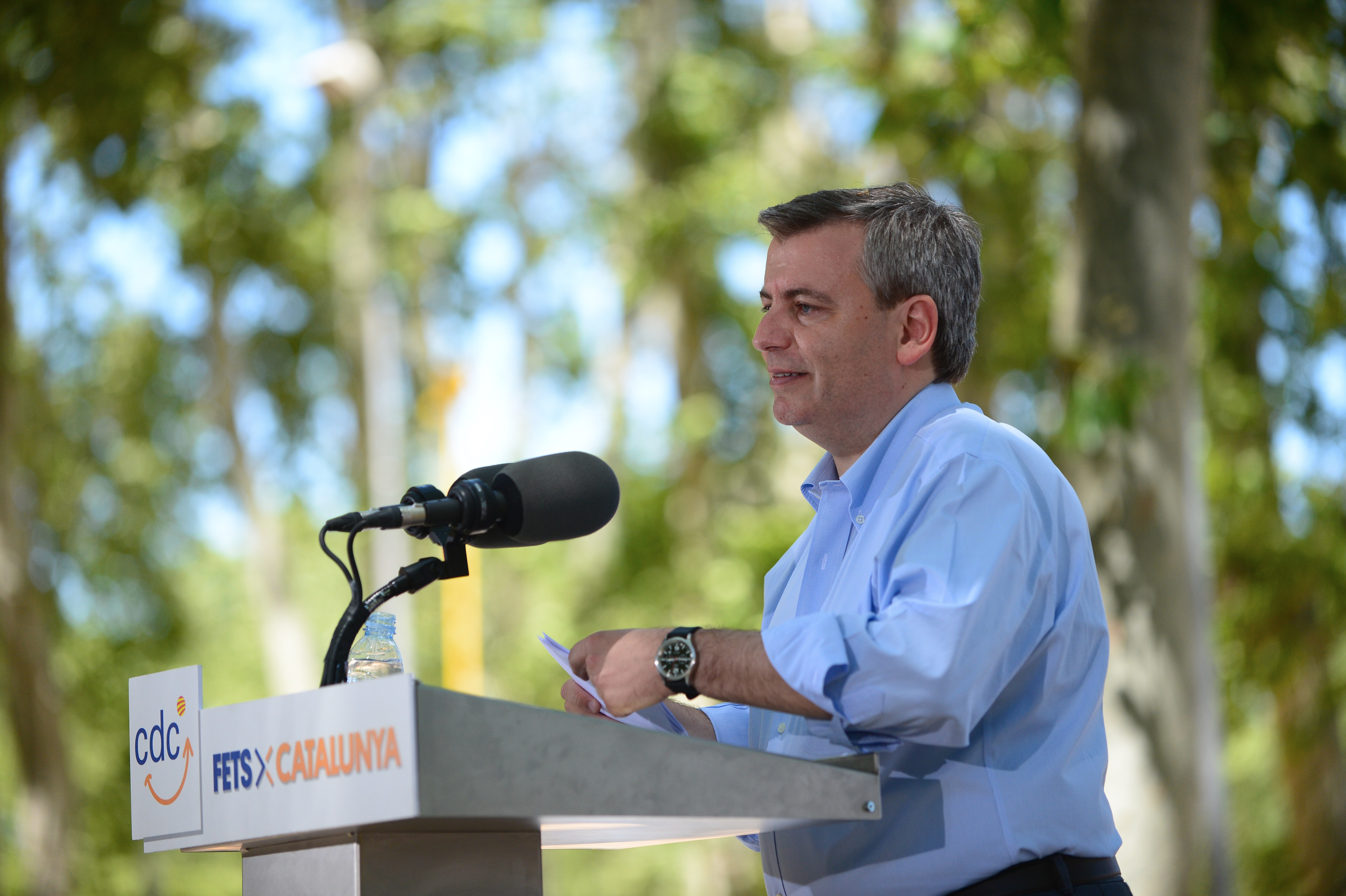
Xuclà addresses the CDC's "Dinar Girona" event on 23 June 2016

Xuclà was head of Institutional Relations in the Generalitat de Catalunya's Department of Environment. He has worked as a lawyer and was professor of administrative and constitutional law at the University of Girona.

At the 1999 local elections Xuclà was placed 20th on the Convergence and Union (CiU) electoral alliance's list of candidates in Olot but the alliance only managed to win 8 seats in the municipality and as a result he failed to get elected. At the 2007 local elections he was placed 21st on the CiU's list of candidates in Olot but the alliance only managed to win 7 seats in the municipality and as a result he failed to get elected. At the 2011 local elections he was placed 21st on the CiU's list of candidates in Olot but the alliance only managed to win 10 seats in the municipality and as a result he failed to get elected. He did not contest the 2015 local elections but was nominated as the CiU's number one substitute candidate in Les Planes d'Hostoles.

Xuclà contested the 2000 general election as a CiU candidate in the Province of Girona and was elected to the Senate of Spain. He contested the 2004 general election as a CiU candidate in the Province of Girona and was elected to the Congress of Deputies. He was re-elected at the 2008, 2011, 2015 and 2016 general elections.

Xuclà is a vice-president of Liberal International and president of the Freedom and Democracy Foundation (Fundació Llibertat i Democràcia), the Catalan section of the Liberal International. He was a member of the Parliamentary Assembly of the Council of Europe and president of the Alliance of Liberals and Democrats for Europe Party (ALDE).

== Personal life ==
Xuclà is married with two daughters.

== Electoral history ==
Electoral history of Jordi Xuclà
| Election | Constituency | Party | Alliance | No. | Result |
|---|---|---|---|---|---|
| 1999 local | Olot | Nationalist Youth of Catalonia | Convergence and Union | 20 | Not elected |
| 2000 general | Province of Girona | Democratic Convergence of Catalonia | Convergence and Union | 3 | Elected |
| 2004 general | Province of Girona | Democratic Convergence of Catalonia | Convergence and Union | 1 | Elected |
| 2007 local | Olot | Democratic Convergence of Catalonia | Convergence and Union | 21 | Not elected |
| 2008 general | Province of Girona | Democratic Convergence of Catalonia | Convergence and Union | 1 | Elected |
| 2007 local | Olot | Democratic Convergence of Catalonia | Convergence and Union | 21 | Not elected |
| 2011 general | Province of Girona | Democratic Convergence of Catalonia | Convergence and Union | 1 | Elected |
| 2015 general | Province of Girona | Democratic Convergence of Catalonia | Democracy and Freedom | 1 | Elected |
| 2016 general | Province of Girona | Democratic Convergence of Catalonia | | 1 | Elected |
