= Marta Sibina Camps =

Spanish social activist, nurse and editor (born 1973)

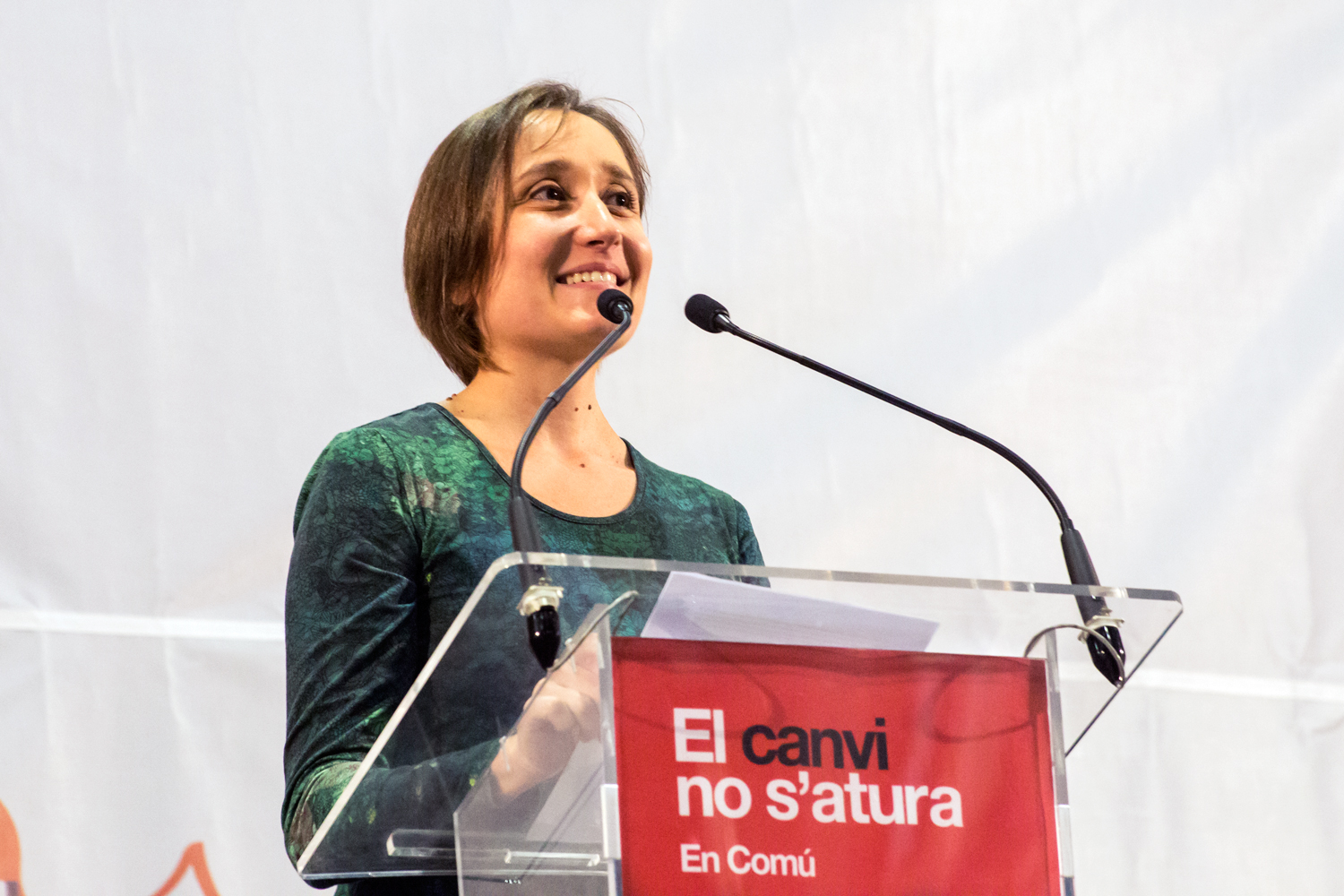

Member of the Spanish Congress of Deputies
- In office 4 January 2016 – 5 March 2019
- Constituency: Barcelona; Girona

Personal details
- Born: 15 May 1973 (age 53) Breda, Spain
- Party: En Comú Podem; Podem Catalunya (since 2017); Council for the Republic (since 2019)
- Domestic partner: Albano Dante Fachin
- Occupation: Nurse, politician

Marta Sibina Camps (born 15 May 1973) is a Spanish health activist, nurse, and member of the 11th and 12th legislatures of the Congress of Deputies. In 2004 she founded the magazine Cafè amb llet, which she also directed.

== Biography ==
Marta Sibina Camps was born in Breda on 15 May 1973. She holds a university degree in nursing, and has completed postgraduate studies in surgical and gerontological nursing.

She has worked at the General Hospital of Granollers as a nurse.

== Political career ==
Sibina participated in the Procés Constituent movement in Catalonia and was part of some working groups during the creation of Barcelona en Comú.

In October 2015, Barcelona en Comú proposed Xavier Domènech and Marta Sibina to head the list for Barcelona in the general elections of 20 December in a left-wing coalition candidacy, En Comú Podem. This brought together Initiative for Catalonia Greens, United and Alternative Left, Barcelona en Comú, and Podemos.

In the elections of 26 June 2016, she retook her seat as deputy for Girona for En Comú Podem.

== Personal life ==
Sibina is the romantic partner of journalist and activist Albano Dante Fachin, who was a member of the Parliament of Catalonia for Catalunya Sí que es Pot from October 2015 to October 2018. Since 2004, they have both worked for the magazine Cafè amb llet, founded in Blanes, with free monthly distribution in Catalonia.

== Publications ==
- 2013 – Artur Mas: On són els meus diners? (Artur Mas: Where is my money?) with Albano Dante Fachin. Prologue by Teresa Forcades and Àngels Martínez Castells. Cafè amb llet magazine.
- 2014 – Conversación entre Alberto San Juan y Cafèambllet. El placer de pasar a la acció (Conversation between Alberto San Juan and Cafèambllet. The pleasure of taking action) with Albano Dante Fachin. Icaria.
