= Albano Dante Fachin =

Argentine-Catalan activist (born 1976)

Parliament of Catalonia
- In office 26 October 2015 – 28 October 2017

Personal details
- Born: Albano Dante Fachin Pozzi; April 22, 1976 (age 50) Bahía Blanca, Argentina
- Occupation: Politician; activist

Albano Dante Fachin (born Albano Dante Fachin Pozzi, 22 April 1976, Bahía Blanca, Argentina) is a Catalan activist and politician of Argentine origin. He was a deputy in the Parliament of Catalonia in the 11th Legislature for the coalition Catalunya Sí que es Pot. In 2017 he founded the party Som Alternativa. He ran as the leader of the Republican Front coalition in the Spanish general elections of April 2019.

== Biography ==
=== Political career ===
In May 2017, Fachín took a position in favor of the unilateral referendum announced by Carles Puigdemont and announced a vote so that Podemos members would make the final decision on the party's position on the matter.
