= Girona (Congress of Deputies constituency) =

Electoral constituency in Spain

Coordinates: 42°10′N 2°40′W

- Congress of Deputies; Electoral constituency
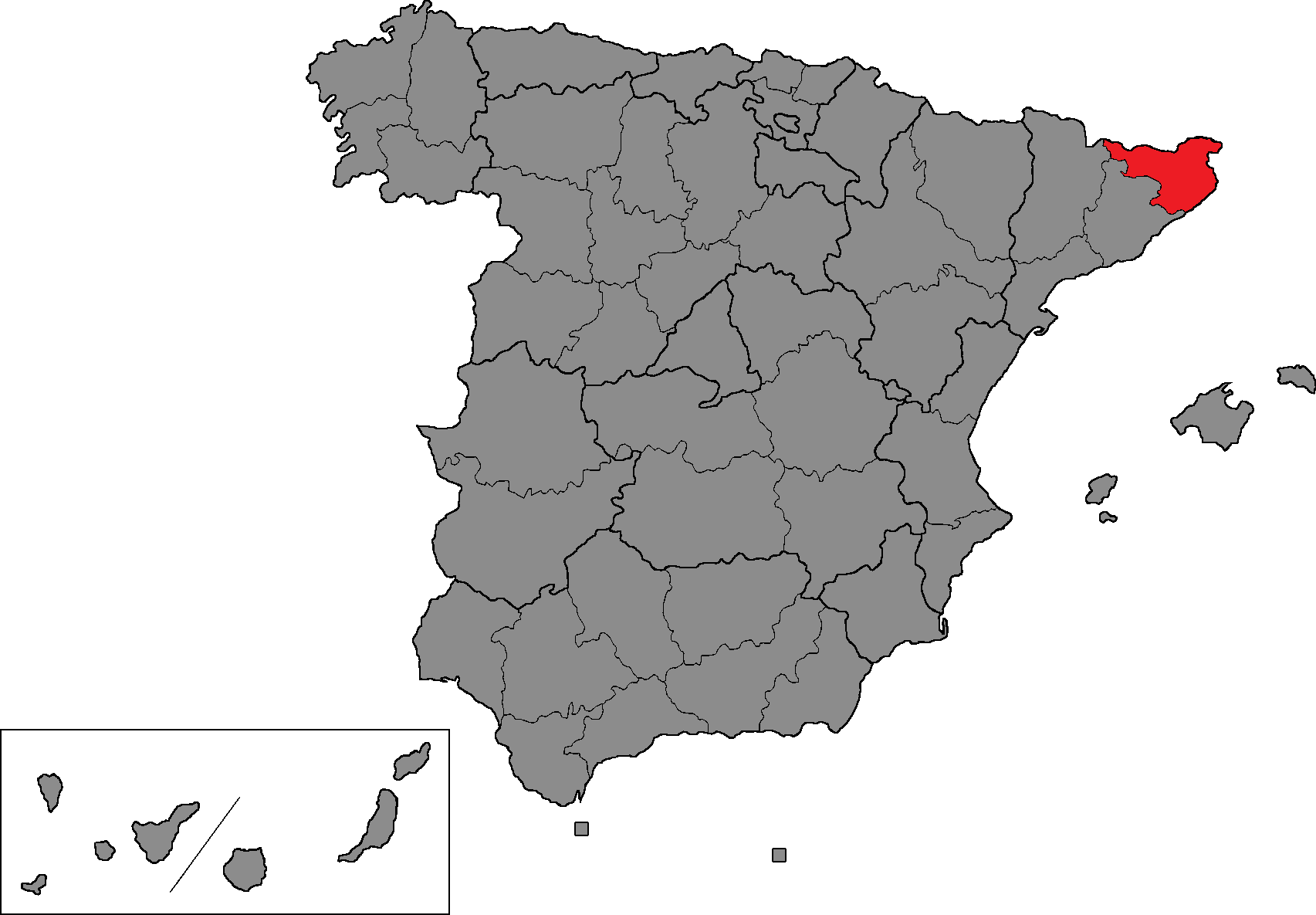
- Location of Girona within Spain
- Province: Girona
- Autonomous community: Catalonia
- Population: ▲822,952 (2024)
- Electorate: ▲546,370 (2023)
- Major settlements: Girona

Current constituency
- Created: 1977
- Seats: 5 (1977–2004); 6 (2004–present)
- Members: PSC (2); Junts (2); ERC (1); Sumar (1)

Girona (Spanish: Gerona) is one of the 52 constituencies represented in the Congress of Deputies, the lower chamber of the Spanish parliament, the Cortes Generales. The constituency (whose boundaries correspond to those of the homonymous province) currently elects six deputies. The electoral system uses the D'Hondt method and closed-list proportional voting, with a minimum threshold of three percent.

== Electoral system ==
The constituency was created as per the Political Reform Law and was first contested in the 1977 general election. The Law provided for the provinces of Spain to be established as multi-member districts in the Congress of Deputies, with this regulation being maintained under the Spanish Constitution of 1978. Additionally, the Constitution requires for any modification of the provincial limits to be approved under an organic law, needing an absolute majority in the Cortes Generales.

Voting is based on universal suffrage, comprising all Spanish nationals over 18 years of age with full political rights, provided that they have not been deprived of the right to vote by a final sentence. The only exception was in 1977, when this was limited to nationals over 21 years of age and in full enjoyment of their political and civil rights. Amendments in 2011 required non-resident citizens to apply for voting, a system known as "begged" voting (Spanish: Voto rogado). which was abolished in 2022. Further, amendments in 2018 granted the right to vote to those legally incapacitated. The Congress of Deputies has a minimum of 300 and a maximum of 400 seats, with electoral provisions fixing its size at 350. Of these, 348 are elected in 50 multi-member constituencies corresponding to the provinces of Spain—each of which is assigned an initial minimum of two seats and the remaining 248 distributed in proportion to population—using the D'Hondt method and closed-list proportional voting, with a three percent-threshold of valid votes (including blank ballots) in each constituency. The remaining two seats are allocated to Ceuta and Melilla as single-member districts elected by plurality voting. The use of this electoral method may result in a higher effective threshold depending on district magnitude and vote distribution. The law does not provide for by-elections to fill vacant seats; instead, any vacancies arising after the proclamation of candidates and during the legislative term are filled by the next candidates on the party lists or, when required, by designated substitutes.

The electoral law allows for parties and federations registered in the interior ministry, alliances and groupings of electors to present lists of candidates. Parties and federations intending to form an alliance are required to inform the relevant electoral commission within 10 days of the election call—15 before 1985—whereas groupings of electors need to secure the signature of at least one percent of the electorate in the constituencies for which they seek election—one permille of the electorate, with a compulsory minimum of 500 signatures, until 1985—disallowing electors from signing for more than one list. Also since 2011, parties, federations or alliances that have not obtained a mandate in either chamber of the Cortes at the preceding election are required to secure the signature of at least 0.1 percent of electors in the aforementioned constituencies. Amendments in 2007 required a balanced composition of men and women in the electoral lists, so that candidates of either sex made up at least 40 percent of the total composition; further amendments in 2024 required the use of a zipper system.

== Deputies ==
Deputies 1977–present
Key to parties ECP Sumar ERC SC PSC–PSOE Junts JxCat–Junts PDC CDC DiL CiU CC–UCD PP AP
Legislature	Election	Distribution
Constituent	1977	2 / 2 / 1
1st	1979	2 / 1 / 2
2nd	1982	2 / 2 / 1
3rd	1986	2 / 3
4th	1989	2 / 3
5th	1993	2 / 3
6th	1996	2 / 3
7th	2000	2 / 2 / 1
8th	2004	2 / 2 / 2
9th	2008	1 / 3 / 2
10th	2011	1 / 1 / 3 / 1
11th	2015	1 / 2 / 1 / 2
12th	2016	1 / 2 / 1 / 2
13th	2019 (Apr)	3 / 1 / 2
14th	2019 (Nov)	1 / 2 / 1 / 2
15th	2023	1 / 1 / 2 / 2

== General elections ==
=== 2026 ===
Summary of the 29 November 2026 Congress of Deputies election results in Girona
Parties and alliances	Popular vote			Seats	
Parties and alliances	Votes	%	±pp	Total	+/−
Socialists' Party of Catalonia (PSC–PSOE)					
Together for Catalonia (JxCat)					
Republican Left of Catalonia (ERC)					
Commons–Broad Front (Comuns–Front Ampli)^{1}					
People's Party (PP)					
Vox (Vox)					
Animalist Party with the Environment (PACMA)					
Workers' Front (FO)					
Communist Party of the Workers of Catalonia (PCTC)					
At the Same Time (Alhora)			New		
Blank ballots					
Total				6	±0
Valid votes					
Invalid votes					
Votes cast / turnout					
Abstentions					
Registered voters	575,269				
Sources
Footnotes: ^{1} Commons–Broad Front results are compared to the combined totals of Unite–In Common We Can and Zero Cuts in the 2023 election.

=== 2023 ===
Summary of the 23 July 2023 Congress of Deputies election results in Girona
Parties and alliances	Popular vote			Seats	
Parties and alliances	Votes	%	±pp	Total	+/−
Socialists' Party of Catalonia (PSC–PSOE)	93,448	28.93	+14.11	2	+1
Together for Catalonia (Junts)^{1}	63,251	19.58	n/a	2	+1
Republican Left of Catalonia (ERC)	47,531	14.72	–11.13	1	–1
Unite–In Common We Can (Sumar–ECP)^{2}	35,344	10.94	+1.46	1	±0
People's Party (PP)	31,341	9.70	+4.79	0	±0
Vox (Vox)	22,706	7.03	+1.83	0	±0
Popular Unity Candidacy–For Rupture (CUP–PR)	18,229	5.64	–3.27	0	±0
Animalist Party with the Environment (PACMA)^{3}	3,531	1.09	+0.04	0	±0
Catalan European Democratic Party–CiU Space (PDeCAT–E–CiU)^{1}	3,388	1.05	n/a	0	–1
Workers' Front (FO)	570	0.18	New	0	±0
Communist Party of the Workers of Catalonia (PCTC)	420	0.13	+0.04	0	±0
Zero Cuts (Recortes Cero)	248	0.08	–0.06	0	±0
Blank ballots	2,981	0.92	+0.27		
Total	322,988			6	±0
Valid votes	322,988	98.73	–0.68		
Invalid votes	4,171	1.27	+0.68		
Votes cast / turnout	327,159	59.88	–8.28		
Abstentions	219,211	40.12	+8.28		
Registered voters	546,370				
Sources
Footnotes: ^{1} Within the Together for Catalonia–Together alliance in the November 2019 election.; ^{2} Unite–In Common We Can results are compared to In Common We Can–Let's Win the Change totals in the November 2019 election.; ^{3} Animalist Party with the Environment results are compared to Animalist Party Against Mistreatment of Animals totals in the November 2019 election.

=== November 2019 ===
Summary of the 10 November 2019 Congress of Deputies election results in Girona
Parties and alliances	Popular vote			Seats	
Parties and alliances	Votes	%	±pp	Total	+/−
Republican Left of Catalonia–Sovereigntists (ERC–Sobiranistes)	91,932	25.85	–3.98	2	–1
Together for Catalonia–Together (JxCat–Junts)	88,060	24.76	+2.30	2	±0
Socialists' Party of Catalonia (PSC–PSOE)	52,723	14.82	–2.29	1	±0
In Common We Can–Let's Win the Change (ECP–Guanyem el Canvi)	33,710	9.48	–0.19	1	+1
Popular Unity Candidacy–For Rupture (CUP–PR)	31,703	8.91	New	0	±0
Vox (Vox)	18,489	5.20	+2.40	0	±0
People's Party (PP)	17,449	4.91	+1.67	0	±0
Citizens–Party of the Citizenry (Cs)	13,869	3.90	–5.00	0	±0
Animalist Party Against Mistreatment of Animals (PACMA)	3,724	1.05	–0.29	0	±0
Zero Cuts–Green Group (Recortes Cero–GV)	508	0.14	+0.03	0	±0
For a Fairer World (PUM+J)	339	0.10	New	0	±0
Communist Party of the Catalan People (PCPC)	327	0.09	±0.00	0	±0
Communist Party of the Workers of Catalonia (PCTC)	316	0.09	New	0	±0
Left in Positive (IZQP)	246	0.07	+0.01	0	±0
Blank ballots	2,307	0.65	+0.17		
Total	355,702			6	±0
Valid votes	355,702	99.41	–0.02		
Invalid votes	2,099	0.59	+0.02		
Votes cast / turnout	357,801	68.16	–5.37		
Abstentions	167,177	31.84	+5.37		
Registered voters	524,978				

=== April 2019 ===
Summary of the 28 April 2019 Congress of Deputies election results in Girona
Parties and alliances	Popular vote			Seats	
Parties and alliances	Votes	%	±pp	Total	+/−
Republican Left of Catalonia–Sovereigntists (ERC–Sobiranistes)	114,031	29.83	+3.58	3	+1
Together for Catalonia–Together (JxCat–Junts)^{1}	85,863	22.46	–0.75	2	±0
Socialists' Party of Catalonia (PSC–PSOE)	65,422	17.11	+4.59	1	±0
In Common We Can–Let's Win the Change (ECP–Guanyem el Canvi)	36,947	9.67	–7.64	0	–1
Citizens–Party of the Citizenry (Cs)	34,009	8.90	+1.19	0	±0
Free People–We Are Alternative–Pirates: Republican Front (Front Republicà)	14,434	3.78	New	0	±0
People's Party (PP)	12,377	3.24	–6.84	0	±0
Vox (Vox)	10,715	2.80	New	0	±0
Animalist Party Against Mistreatment of Animals (PACMA)	5,112	1.34	–0.16	0	±0
Convergents (CNV)	485	0.13	New	0	±0
Zero Cuts–Green Group (Recortes Cero–GV)	433	0.11	–0.08	0	±0
Communist Party of the Catalan People (PCPC)	353	0.09	–0.06	0	±0
Left in Positive (IZQP)	240	0.06	New	0	±0
Blank ballots	1,854	0.48	–0.38		
Total	382,275			6	±0
Valid votes	382,275	99.43	+0.24		
Invalid votes	2,198	0.57	–0.24		
Votes cast / turnout	384,473	73.53	+12.95		
Abstentions	138,387	26.47	–12.95		
Registered voters	522,860				
Sources
Footnotes: ^{1} Together for Catalonia–Together results are compared to Democratic Convergence of Catalonia totals in the 2016 election.

=== 2016 ===
Summary of the 26 June 2016 Congress of Deputies election results in Girona
Parties and alliances	Popular vote			Seats	
Parties and alliances	Votes	%	±pp	Total	+/−
Republican Left–Catalonia Yes (ERC–CatSí)	80,824	26.25	+2.79	2	±0
Democratic Convergence of Catalonia (CDC)^{1}	71,453	23.21	–1.79	2	±0
In Common We Can–Let's Win the Change (ECP)	53,277	17.31	+1.05	1	±0
Socialists' Party of Catalonia (PSC–PSOE)	38,558	12.52	–0.14	1	±0
People's Party (PP)	31,035	10.08	+1.54	0	±0
Citizens–Party of the Citizenry (C's)	23,748	7.71	–2.14	0	±0
Animalist Party Against Mistreatment of Animals (PACMA)	4,627	1.50	+0.41	0	±0
Platform for Catalonia (PxC)	724	0.24	New	0	±0
Zero Cuts–Green Group (Recortes Cero–GV)	583	0.19	–0.08	0	±0
Communist Party of the Catalan People (PCPC)	382	0.12	–0.06	0	±0
Blank ballots	2,642	0.86	+0.10		
Total	307,853			6	±0
Valid votes	307,853	99.19	+0.07		
Invalid votes	2,524	0.81	–0.07		
Votes cast / turnout	310,377	60.58	–5.01		
Abstentions	201,989	39.42	+5.01		
Registered voters	512,366				
Sources
Footnotes: ^{1} Democratic Convergence of Catalonia results are compared to Democracy and Freedom totals in the 2015 election.

=== 2015 ===
Summary of the 20 December 2015 Congress of Deputies election results in Girona
Parties and alliances	Popular vote			Seats	
Parties and alliances	Votes	%	±pp	Total	+/−
Democracy and Freedom (DiL)^{1}	83,170	25.00	–14.23	2	–1
Republican Left of Catalonia–Catalonia Yes (ERC–CatSí)	78,030	23.46	+12.68	2	+1
In Common We Can (En Comú)^{2}	54,071	16.26	+10.78	1	+1
Socialists' Party of Catalonia (PSC–PSOE)	42,096	12.66	–8.78	1	±0
Citizens–Party of the Citizenry (C's)	32,762	9.85	New	0	±0
People's Party (PP)	28,410	8.54	–7.66	0	–1
Democratic Union of Catalonia (unio.cat)	5,871	1.77	New	0	±0
Animalist Party Against Mistreatment of Animals (PACMA)	3,623	1.09	+0.38	0	±0
Zero Cuts–Green Group (Recortes Cero–GV)	889	0.27	New	0	±0
Communist Party of the Catalan People (PCPC)	602	0.18	+0.02	0	±0
Union, Progress and Democracy (UPyD)	586	0.18	–0.41	0	±0
Blank ballots	2,513	0.76	–1.06		
Total	332,623			6	±0
Valid votes	332,623	99.12	+0.98		
Invalid votes	2,938	0.88	–0.98		
Votes cast / turnout	335,561	65.59	+3.17		
Abstentions	176,079	34.41	–3.17		
Registered voters	511,640				
Sources
Footnotes: ^{1} Democracy and Freedom results are compared to Convergence and Union totals in the 2011 election.; ^{2} In Common We Can results are compared to Initiative for Catalonia Greens–United and Alternative Left: Plural L. totals in the 2011 election.

=== 2011 ===
Summary of the 20 November 2011 Congress of Deputies election results in Girona
Parties and alliances	Popular vote			Seats	
Parties and alliances	Votes	%	±pp	Total	+/−
Convergence and Union (CiU)	120,156	39.23	+12.02	3	+1
Socialists' Party of Catalonia (PSC–PSOE)	65,674	21.44	–18.09	1	–2
People's Party (PP)	49,617	16.20	+4.00	1	+1
Republican Left of Catalonia–Rally–Catalonia Yes (ERC–RI.cat)	33,000	10.78	–2.41	1	±0
Initiative for Catalonia Greens–United and Alternative Left: Plural L. (ICV–EUiA)	16,777	5.48	+2.27	0	±0
Blank Seats (EB)	5,206	1.70	+1.52	0	±0
Platform for Catalonia (PxC)	2,636	0.86	New	0	±0
Animalist Party Against Mistreatment of Animals (PACMA)	2,163	0.71	+0.43	0	±0
Pirates of Catalonia (Pirata.cat)	1,865	0.61	New	0	±0
Union, Progress and Democracy (UPyD)	1,798	0.59	+0.48	0	±0
Anti-capitalists (Anticapitalistas)	1,099	0.36	New	0	±0
Communist Party of the Catalan People (PCPC)	480	0.16	+0.04	0	±0
Communist Unification of Spain (UCE)	205	0.07	New	0	±0
Blank ballots	5,572	1.82	+0.11		
Total	306,248			6	±0
Valid votes	306,248	98.14	–1.05		
Invalid votes	5,808	1.86	+1.05		
Votes cast / turnout	312,056	62.42	–6.34		
Abstentions	187,853	37.58	+6.34		
Registered voters	499,909				

=== 2008 ===
Summary of the 9 March 2008 Congress of Deputies election results in Girona
Parties and alliances	Popular vote			Seats	
Parties and alliances	Votes	%	±pp	Total	+/−
Socialists' Party of Catalonia (PSC–PSOE)	131,994	39.53	+7.91	3	+1
Convergence and Union (CiU)	90,836	27.21	+0.11	2	±0
Republican Left of Catalonia (esquerra)	44,030	13.19	–10.15	1	–1
People's Party (PP)	40,722	12.20	+0.75	0	±0
Initiative for Catalonia Greens–United and Alternative Left (ICV–EUiA)	10,727	3.21	–1.00	0	±0
The Greens–Green Alternative (EV–AV)	2,028	0.61	+0.10	0	±0
Catalan Republican Party (RC)	1,141	0.34	New	0	±0
Anti-Bullfighting Party Against Mistreatment of Animals (PACMA)	937	0.28	New	0	±0
Citizens–Party of the Citizenry (C's)	924	0.28	New	0	±0
Internationalist Socialist Workers' Party (POSI)	923	0.28	New	0	±0
Unsubmissive Seats–Alternative of Discontented Democrats (Ei–ADD)	617	0.18	+0.12	0	±0
Republican Left–Left Republican Party (IR–PRE)	569	0.17	–0.06	0	±0
Citizens for Blank Votes (CenB)	438	0.13	+0.01	0	±0
Communist Party of the Catalan People (PCPC)	417	0.12	+0.04	0	±0
Union, Progress and Democracy (UPyD)	376	0.11	New	0	±0
Party for Catalonia (PxCat)	231	0.07	New	0	±0
For a Fairer World (PUM+J)	201	0.06	New	0	±0
Spanish Phalanx of the CNSO (FE de las JONS)	188	0.06	New	0	±0
Family and Life Party (PFiV)	146	0.04	–0.02	0	±0
National Democracy (DN)	144	0.04	±0.00	0	±0
Internationalist Struggle (LI (LIT–CI))	123	0.04	+0.01	0	±0
Humanist Party (PH)	110	0.03	–0.01	0	±0
Spain 2000 (E–2000)	75	0.02	New	0	±0
Spanish Front (Frente)	57	0.02	New	0	±0
Spanish Alternative (AES)	57	0.02	New	0	±0
Carlist Party of Catalonia (PCdeC)	54	0.02	New	0	±0
Civil Liberties Party (PLCI)	52	0.02	New	0	±0
National Alliance (AN)	50	0.01	New	0	±0
Blank ballots	5,714	1.71	+0.96		
Total	333,881			6	±0
Valid votes	333,881	99.19	–0.38		
Invalid votes	2,736	0.81	+0.38		
Votes cast / turnout	336,617	68.76	–7.27		
Abstentions	152,955	31.24	+7.27		
Registered voters	489,572				

=== 2004 ===
Summary of the 14 March 2004 Congress of Deputies election results in Girona
Parties and alliances	Popular vote			Seats	
Parties and alliances	Votes	%	±pp	Total	+/−
Socialists' Party of Catalonia (PSC–PSOE)	113,089	31.62	+3.24	2	±0
Convergence and Union (CiU)	96,928	27.10	–13.95	2	±0
Republican Left of Catalonia (ERC)	83,482	23.34	+14.69	2	+2
People's Party (PP)	40,959	11.45	–4.48	0	–1
Initiative for Catalonia Greens–United and Alternative Left (ICV–EUiA)^{1}	15,070	4.21	+0.83	0	±0
The Greens–Green Alternative (EV–AV)	1,836	0.51	–0.10	0	±0
Republican Left–Left Republican Party (IR–PRE)	827	0.23	New	0	±0
Internationalist Socialist Workers' Party (POSI)	620	0.17	–0.01	0	±0
Citizens for Blank Votes (CenB)	415	0.12	New	0	±0
Communist Party of the Catalan People (PCPC)	299	0.08	New	0	±0
Democratic and Social Centre (CDS)	238	0.07	+0.02	0	±0
The Phalanx (FE)	237	0.07	+0.01	0	±0
Unsubmissive Seats–Alternative of Discontented Democrats (Ei–ADD)	216	0.06	New	0	±0
Family and Life Party (PFiV)	201	0.06	New	0	±0
Humanist Party (PH)	153	0.04	–0.02	0	±0
National Democracy (DN)	139	0.04	New	0	±0
Internationalist Struggle (LI (LIT–CI))	97	0.03	–0.01	0	±0
Caló Nationalist Party (PNCA)	87	0.02	–0.01	0	±0
Republican Social Movement (MSR)	77	0.02	New	0	±0
Blank ballots	2,672	0.75	–0.61		
Total	357,642			6	+1
Valid votes	357,642	99.57	+0.24		
Invalid votes	1,552	0.43	–0.24		
Votes cast / turnout	359,194	76.03	+11.07		
Abstentions	113,249	23.97	–11.07		
Registered voters	472,443				
Sources
Footnotes: ^{1} Initiative for Catalonia Greens–United and Alternative Left results are compared to the combined totals of Initiative for Catalonia–Greens and United and Alternative Left in the 2000 election.

=== 2000 ===
Summary of the 12 March 2000 Congress of Deputies election results in Girona
Parties and alliances	Popular vote			Seats	
Parties and alliances	Votes	%	±pp	Total	+/−
Convergence and Union (CiU)	121,116	41.05	–0.38	2	–1
Socialists' Party of Catalonia (PSC–PSOE)	83,741	28.38	–8.09	2	±0
People's Party (PP)	46,992	15.93	+3.92	1	+1
Republican Left of Catalonia (ERC)	25,534	8.65	+3.02	0	±0
Initiative for Catalonia–Greens (IC–V)	5,346	1.81	–1.54	0	±0
United and Alternative Left (EUiA)	4,644	1.57	New	0	±0
The Greens–Green Alternative (EV–AV)	1,790	0.61	New	0	±0
Internationalist Socialist Workers' Party (POSI)	541	0.18	New	0	±0
Catalan State (EC)	334	0.11	New	0	±0
The Phalanx (FE)	188	0.06	New	0	±0
Humanist Party (PH)	178	0.06	–0.01	0	±0
Centrist Union–Democratic and Social Centre (UC–CDS)	161	0.05	–0.02	0	±0
Natural Law Party (PLN)	144	0.05	New	0	±0
Internationalist Struggle (LI (LIT–CI))	108	0.04	New	0	±0
Spain 2000 Platform (ES2000)	85	0.03	New	0	±0
Caló Nationalist Party (PNCA)	78	0.03	New	0	±0
Spanish Democratic Party (PADE)	60	0.02	New	0	±0
Blank ballots	4,007	1.36	+0.83		
Total	295,047			5	±0
Valid votes	295,047	99.33	–0.22		
Invalid votes	2,001	0.67	+0.22		
Votes cast / turnout	297,048	64.96	–12.06		
Abstentions	160,240	35.04	+12.06		
Registered voters	457,288				

=== 1996 ===
Summary of the 3 March 1996 Congress of Deputies election results in Girona
Parties and alliances	Popular vote			Seats	
Parties and alliances	Votes	%	±pp	Total	+/−
Convergence and Union (CiU)	136,448	41.43	–1.48	3	±0
Socialists' Party of Catalonia (PSC–PSOE)	120,118	36.47	+8.32	2	±0
People's Party (PP)	39,569	12.01	–1.01	0	±0
Republican Left of Catalonia (ERC)	18,548	5.63	–3.50	0	±0
Initiative for Catalonia–The Greens (IC–EV)	11,038	3.35	–0.12	0	±0
The European Greens–Ecologist Alternative of Catalonia (EVE–AEC)^{1}	620	0.19	–0.76	0	±0
Ecologist Party of Catalonia (PEC)	325	0.10	New	0	±0
Workers' Revolutionary Party (PRT)^{2}	273	0.08	–0.29	0	±0
Centrist Union (UC)	219	0.07	–0.44	0	±0
Humanist Party (PH)	219	0.07	+0.03	0	±0
Authentic Spanish Phalanx (FEA)	131	0.04	New	0	±0
Citizen Independent Platform of Catalonia (PICC)	90	0.03	New	0	±0
Revolutionary Workers' Party (POR)	0	0.00	–0.10	0	±0
Blank ballots	1,739	0.53	–0.11		
Total	329,337			5	±0
Valid votes	329,337	99.55	+0.07		
Invalid votes	1,495	0.45	–0.07		
Votes cast / turnout	330,832	77.02	+2.55		
Abstentions	98,694	22.98	–2.55		
Registered voters	429,526				
Sources
Footnotes: ^{1} The European Greens–Ecologist Alternative of Catalonia results are compared to The Greens–Ecologist Confederation of Catalonia totals in the 1993 election.; ^{2} Workers' Revolutionary Party results are compared to Workers' Socialist Party totals in the 1993 election.

=== 1993 ===
Summary of the 6 June 1993 Congress of Deputies election results in Girona
Parties and alliances	Popular vote			Seats	
Parties and alliances	Votes	%	±pp	Total	+/−
Convergence and Union (CiU)	128,957	42.91	–3.97	3	±0
Socialists' Party of Catalonia (PSC–PSOE)	84,586	28.15	–0.74	2	±0
People's Party (PP)	39,112	13.02	+5.08	0	±0
Republican Left of Catalonia (ERC)	27,449	9.13	+5.71	0	±0
Initiative for Catalonia (IC)	10,437	3.47	–0.44	0	±0
The Greens–Ecologist Confederation of Catalonia (EV–CEC)^{1}	2,846	0.95	–0.29	0	±0
Democratic and Social Centre (CDS)	1,519	0.51	–2.49	0	±0
Workers' Socialist Party (PST)	1,124	0.37	–0.17	0	±0
The Ecologists (LE)	1,078	0.36	–0.45	0	±0
Ruiz-Mateos Group (ARM)	682	0.23	–1.01	0	±0
Revolutionary Workers' Party (POR)	290	0.10	±0.00	0	±0
Coalition for a New Socialist Party (CNPS)^{2}	216	0.07	–0.02	0	±0
Natural Law Party (PLN)	170	0.06	New	0	±0
Humanist Party (PH)	125	0.04	–0.01	0	±0
Communist Unification of Spain (UCE)	0	0.00	New	0	±0
Blank ballots	1,911	0.64	–0.13		
Total	300,502			5	±0
Valid votes	300,502	99.48	+0.12		
Invalid votes	1,577	0.52	–0.12		
Votes cast / turnout	302,079	74.47	+7.21		
Abstentions	103,577	25.53	–7.21		
Registered voters	405,656				
Sources
Footnotes: ^{1} The Greens–Ecologist Confederation of Catalonia results are compared to the combined totals of Green Alternative–Ecologist Movement of Catalonia and The Greens–Green List in the 1989 election.; ^{2} Coalition for a New Socialist Party results are compared to Alliance for the Republic totals in the 1989 election.

=== 1989 ===
Summary of the 29 October 1989 Congress of Deputies election results in Gerona
Parties and alliances	Popular vote			Seats	
Parties and alliances	Votes	%	±pp	Total	+/−
Convergence and Union (CiU)	120,849	46.88	+0.98	3	±0
Socialists' Party of Catalonia (PSC–PSOE)	74,469	28.89	–2.53	2	±0
People's Party (PP)^{1}	20,468	7.94	–1.97	0	±0
Initiative for Catalonia (IC)^{2}	10,089	3.91	+1.36	0	±0
Republican Left of Catalonia (ERC)	8,806	3.42	–0.07	0	±0
Democratic and Social Centre (CDS)	7,726	3.00	+0.43	0	±0
Ruiz-Mateos Group (Ruiz-Mateos)	3,197	1.24	New	0	±0
Green Alternative–Ecologist Movement of Catalonia (AV–MEC)^{3}	3,188	1.24	+0.05	0	±0
The Ecologist Greens (EVE)	2,097	0.81	New	0	±0
Workers' Socialist Party (PST)	1,401	0.54	–0.08	0	±0
Party of the Communists of Catalonia (PCC)	1,261	0.49	–0.12	0	±0
Workers' Party of Spain–Communist Unity (PTE–UC)^{4}	740	0.29	–0.04	0	±0
Social Democratic Coalition (CSD)^{5}	418	0.16	–0.09	0	±0
Revolutionary Workers' Party of Spain (PORE)	258	0.10	–0.03	0	±0
Alliance for the Republic (AxR)^{6}	227	0.09	–0.11	0	±0
Spanish Phalanx of the CNSO (FE–JONS)	197	0.08	–0.06	0	±0
Centrist Unity–Democratic Spanish Party (PED)	154	0.06	New	0	±0
Humanist Party of Catalonia (PHC)	140	0.05	New	0	±0
Valencian Nationalist Left–Valencian Regional Union (ENV–URV)	86	0.03	New	0	±0
Communist Party of Spain (Marxist–Leninist) (PCE (m–l))^{7}	0	0.00	–0.14	0	±0
The Greens–Green List (EV–LV)	0	0.00	New	0	±0
Blank ballots	1,986	0.77	+0.37		
Total	257,757			5	±0
Valid votes	257,757	99.36	+0.32		
Invalid votes	1,654	0.64	–0.32		
Votes cast / turnout	259,411	67.26	–4.39		
Abstentions	126,271	32.74	+4.39		
Registered voters	385,682				
Sources
Footnotes: ^{1} People's Party results are compared to People's Coalition totals in the 1986 election.; ^{2} Initiative for Catalonia results are compared to Union of the Catalan Left totals in the 1986 election.; ^{3} Green Alternative–Ecologist Movement of Catalonia results are compared to Green Alternative List totals in the 1986 election.; ^{4} Workers' Party of Spain–Communist Unity results are compared to Communists' Unity Board totals in the 1986 election.; ^{5} Social Democratic Coalition results are compared to Social Democratic Party of Catalonia totals in the 1986 election.; ^{6} Alliance for the Republic results are compared to Internationalist Socialist Workers' Party totals in the 1986 election.; ^{7} Communist Party of Spain (Marxist–Leninist) results are compared to Republican Popular Unity totals in the 1986 election.

=== 1986 ===
Summary of the 22 June 1986 Congress of Deputies election results in Gerona
Parties and alliances	Popular vote			Seats	
Parties and alliances	Votes	%	±pp	Total	+/−
Convergence and Union (CiU)	119,963	45.90	+9.85	3	+1
Socialists' Party of Catalonia (PSC–PSOE)	82,116	31.42	–2.73	2	±0
People's Coalition (AP–PDP–PL)^{1}	25,892	9.91	–3.26	0	–1
Republican Left of Catalonia (ERC)	9,118	3.49	–2.18	0	±0
Democratic and Social Centre (CDS)	6,705	2.57	+0.58	0	±0
Union of the Catalan Left (PSUC–ENE)^{2}	6,659	2.55	–1.58	0	±0
Green Alternative List (LAV)	3,114	1.19	New	0	±0
Workers' Socialist Party (PST)	1,633	0.62	+0.02	0	±0
Party of the Communists of Catalonia (PCC)	1,603	0.61	+0.02	0	±0
Communists' Unity Board (MUC)	872	0.33	New	0	±0
Social Democratic Party of Catalonia (PSDC)	664	0.25	New	0	±0
Internationalist Socialist Workers' Party (POSI)	510	0.20	New	0	±0
Spanish Phalanx of the CNSO (FE–JONS)	377	0.14	+0.14	0	±0
Republican Popular Unity (UPR)^{3}	369	0.14	+0.02	0	±0
Communist Unification of Spain (UCE)	359	0.14	+0.06	0	±0
Revolutionary Workers' Party of Spain (PORE)	327	0.13	New	0	±0
Blank ballots	1,051	0.40	+0.04		
Total	261,332			5	±0
Valid votes	261,332	99.04	+0.87		
Invalid votes	2,522	0.96	–0.87		
Votes cast / turnout	263,854	71.65	–8.68		
Abstentions	104,387	28.35	+8.68		
Registered voters	368,241				
Sources
Footnotes: ^{1} People's Coalition results are compared to People's Alliance–People's Democratic Party totals in the 1982 election.; ^{2} Union of the Catalan Left results are compared to Unified Socialist Party of Catalonia totals in the 1982 election.; ^{3} Republican Popular Unity results are compared to Communist Party of Spain (Marxist–Leninist) totals in the 1982 election.

=== 1982 ===
Summary of the 28 October 1982 Congress of Deputies election results in Gerona
Parties and alliances	Popular vote			Seats	
Parties and alliances	Votes	%	±pp	Total	+/−
Convergence and Union (CiU)	96,306	36.05	+11.22	2	+1
Socialists' Party of Catalonia (PSC–PSOE)	91,228	34.15	+6.12	2	±0
People's Alliance–People's Democratic Party (AP–PDP)^{1}	35,178	13.17	+9.82	1	+1
Republican Left of Catalonia (ERC)	15,157	5.67	+1.46	0	±0
Unified Socialist Party of Catalonia (PSUC–PCE)	8,431	3.16	–6.25	0	±0
Centrists of Catalonia (CC–UCD)	5,994	2.24	–22.67	0	–2
Democratic and Social Centre (CDS)	5,328	1.99	New	0	±0
Left Nationalists (NE)	2,589	0.97	New	0	±0
Workers' Socialist Party (PST)	1,596	0.60	New	0	±0
Party of the Communists of Catalonia (PCC)	1,569	0.59	New	0	±0
New Force (FN)^{2}	1,377	0.52	–0.48	0	±0
Conservatives of Catalonia (CiC)	478	0.18	New	0	±0
Communist Party of Spain (Marxist–Leninist) (PCE (m–l))	330	0.12	New	0	±0
Communist Front of Catalonia (FCC)^{3}	224	0.08	–0.10	0	±0
Communist Unification of Spain (UCE)	204	0.08	New	0	±0
Communist League–Internationalist Socialist Workers' Coalition (LC (COSI))	161	0.06	New	0	±0
Spanish Phalanx of the CNSO (FE–JONS)	0	0.00	New	0	±0
Blank ballots	962	0.36	+0.05		
Total	267,112			5	±0
Valid votes	267,112	98.17	–0.15		
Invalid votes	4,987	1.83	+0.15		
Votes cast / turnout	272,099	80.33	+8.83		
Abstentions	66,625	19.67	–8.83		
Registered voters	338,724				
Sources
Footnotes: ^{1} People's Alliance–People's Democratic Party results are compared to Democratic Coalition totals in the 1979 election.; ^{2} New Force results are compared to National Union totals in the 1979 election.; ^{3} Communist Front of Catalonia results are compared to Revolutionary Communist League totals in the 1979 election.

=== 1979 ===
Summary of the 1 March 1979 Congress of Deputies election results in Gerona
Parties and alliances	Popular vote			Seats	
Parties and alliances	Votes	%	±pp	Total	+/−
Socialists' Party of Catalonia (PSC–PSOE)^{1}	66,328	28.03	–2.69	2	±0
Centrists of Catalonia (CC–UCD)^{2}	58,939	24.91	+6.55	2	+1
Convergence and Union (CiU)^{3}	58,735	24.83	–7.89	1	–1
Unified Socialist Party of Catalonia (PSUC–PCE)	22,261	9.41	–0.64	0	±0
Republican Left of Catalonia–National Front of Catalonia (ERC–FNC)^{4}	9,964	4.21	+1.70	0	±0
Democratic Coalition (CD)^{5}	7,927	3.35	+0.12	0	±0
National Union (UN)	2,372	1.00	New	0	±0
Left Bloc for National Liberation (BEAN)	1,939	0.82	New	0	±0
Communist Organization of Spain (Red Flag) (OCE–BR)	1,455	0.61	New	0	±0
Workers' Communist Party (PCT)	1,440	0.61	New	0	±0
Republican Left (IR)	1,374	0.58	New	0	±0
Party of Labour of Catalonia (PTC–PTE)	1,229	0.52	New	0	±0
Carlist Party (PC)	517	0.22	New	0	±0
Workers' Revolutionary Organization (ORT)	513	0.22	New	0	±0
Communist Movement–Organization of Communist Left (MC–OIC)	457	0.19	New	0	±0
Revolutionary Communist League (LCR)^{6}	416	0.18	–0.38	0	±0
Spanish Phalanx–Falangist Unity (FE–UF)	0	0.00	New	0	±0
Blank ballots	728	0.31	+0.11		
Total	236,594			5	±0
Valid votes	236,594	98.32	–0.23		
Invalid votes	4,042	1.68	+0.23		
Votes cast / turnout	240,636	71.50	–10.60		
Abstentions	95,903	28.50	+10.60		
Registered voters	336,539				
Sources
Footnotes: ^{1} Socialists' Party of Catalonia results are compared to the combined totals of Socialists of Catalonia and People's Socialist Party–Socialist Unity in the 1977 election.; ^{2} Centrists of Catalonia results are compared to Union of the Democratic Centre totals in the 1977 election.; ^{3} Convergence and Union results are compared to the combined totals of Democratic Pact for Catalonia and Union of the Centre and Christian Democracy of Catalonia in the 1977 election.; ^{4} Republican Left of Catalonia–National Front of Catalonia results are compared to Left of Catalonia–Democratic Electoral Front totals in the 1977 election.; ^{5} Democratic Coalition results are compared to Catalan Coexistence–People's Alliance totals in the 1977 election.; ^{6} Revolutionary Communist League results are compared to Front for Workers' Unity totals in the 1977 election.

=== 1977 ===
Summary of the 15 June 1977 Congress of Deputies election results in Gerona
Parties and alliances	Popular vote			Seats	
Parties and alliances	Votes	%	±pp	Total	+/−
Democratic Pact for Catalonia (PDC)	67,275	27.31	n/a	2	n/a
Socialists of Catalonia (PSC–PSOE)	60,747	24.66	n/a	2	n/a
Union of the Democratic Centre (UCD)	45,231	18.36	n/a	1	n/a
Unified Socialist Party of Catalonia (PSUC–PCE)	24,746	10.05	n/a	0	n/a
Union of the Centre and Christian Democracy of Catalonia (UCiDCC)	13,331	5.41	n/a	0	n/a
League of Catalonia–Catalan Liberal Party (LC–PLC)	10,906	4.43	n/a	0	n/a
Catalan Coexistence–People's Alliance (CC–AP)	7,953	3.23	n/a	0	n/a
Congress Independent Candidacy for Girona (CICPG)	6,411	2.60	n/a	0	n/a
Left of Catalonia–Democratic Electoral Front (EC–FED)	6,178	2.51	n/a	0	n/a
People's Socialist Party–Socialist Unity (PSP–US)	1,673	0.68	n/a	0	n/a
Front for Workers' Unity (FUT)	1,389	0.56	n/a	0	n/a
Blank ballots	505	0.20	n/a		
Total	246,345			5	n/a
Valid votes	246,345	98.55	n/a		
Invalid votes	3,615	1.45	n/a		
Votes cast / turnout	249,960	82.10	n/a		
Abstentions	54,488	17.90	n/a		
Registered voters	304,448				

== Bibliography ==
- Ley 1/1977, de 4 de enero, para la Reforma Política (Fundamental Law 1/1977). Official State Gazette (in Spanish). 4 January 1977. BOE-A-1977-165.
- Real Decreto-ley 20/1977, de 18 de marzo, sobre Normas Electorales (Royal Decree-Law 20/1977). Official State Gazette (in Spanish). 18 March 1977. BOE-A-1977-7445.
- Constitución Española (Constitution). Official State Gazette (in Spanish). 27 December 1978. BOE-A-1978-31229.
- Ley Orgánica 5/1985, de 19 de junio, del Régimen Electoral General (Organic Law 5/1985). Official State Gazette (in Spanish). 19 June 1985. BOE-A-1985-11672.
- Carreras de Odriozola, Albert; Tafunell Sambola, Xavier (2005) [1989]. Estadísticas históricas de España, siglos XIX-XX (PDF) (in Spanish). Vol. 1 (II ed.). Bilbao: Fundación BBVA. pp. 1072–1097. ISBN 84-96515-00-1. Archived from the original (PDF) on 24 September 2015.
