= Som Alternativa =

We Are Alternative Som Alternativa
- Leader: Albano Dante Fachin
- Founders: Albano Dante Fachin; Àngels Martínez; Marta Sibina
- Founded: 12 November 2017 (platform); 25 February 2019 (party)
- Split from: Podem
- Headquarters: Avda. Vallserrat, 64; 08635, Sant Esteve Sesrovires
- Ideology: Catalan independence Progressivism; Republicanism
- Political position: Left-wing
- National affiliation: Republican Front

Website
- www.somalternativa.cat

Som Alternativa (English: "We Are Alternative") is a political movement in Catalonia founded by former Podemos/Podem regional leader Albano Dante Fachin as a political platform in November 2017. It was registered as a party on 25 February 2019. The party contested the April 2019 Spanish general election within the Republican Front alliance with Poble Lliure and Pirates of Catalonia.
