= Republican Front (Catalonia) =

Republican Front Front Republicà
- Founded: 14 March 2019
- Dissolved: 15 May 2019
- Ideology: Catalan independence Republicanism; Socialism (factions)
- Political position: Left-wing

Website
- www.front-republica.cat

Republican Front (Catalan: Front Republicà) was a Catalan left-wing and republicanist electoral alliance formed for the April 2019 Spanish general election by Free People (Catalan: Poble Lliure), We Are Alternative (Catalan: Som Alternativa) and Pirates of Catalonia and the support of La Forja.

== History ==
The coalition was presented on March 15, 2019 at the headquarters of the "Escarré International Center for Ethnic and National Minorities" (CIEMEN) and included Free People, We Are Alternative and Pirates of Catalonia. It was presented in the 2019 Spanish general election and was led by Albano Dante Fachin, Maribel Rodríguez, Guillem Fuster, Mireia Caldés and Roger Español.

The coalition fielded candidates in all four Catalan constituencies in the election. It won 113,807 votes, 2.8% of the total vote in Catalonia, placing eighth overall. However, the coalition fell below the 3% electoral threshold in all but one constituency (Girona), and failed to elect any deputies.

On May 15, 2019 the three constituent parties of the Republican Front decided to dissolve the coalition. Poble Lliure and the Pirates have both endorsed the candidacy of Popular Unity Candidacy (Catalan: Candidatura d'Unitat Popular, CUP) for the November 2019 election.

== Composition ==
Party
Free People (PL–PPCC)
We Are Alternative (Som Alternativa)
Pirates of Catalonia (Pirata.cat)

== Electoral results ==
=== Cortes Generales ===
Cortes Generales
Election	Congress							Senate		Status
Election	Vote	%	Score	% (Note: In Catalonia.)	Score	Seats	+/–	Seats	+/–	Status
2019	113,807	0.43	13th	2.74	8th	0 / 48	—	0 / 16	—	None
