= Pirate Party of Catalonia =

Pirates of Catalonia Pirates de Catalunya
- Secretary-General: Enric Pineda Traïd
- Founded: 4 October 2010
- Headquarters: Barcelona
- Youth wing: Grumets Pirates
- Membership (2012): 767
- Ideology: Pirate politics Freedom of Information; Protection of privacy Intellectual property reform Transparency of government Direct democracy Catalan right of self-determination Catalan independence
- National affiliation: Pirate Party (Spain)
- International affiliation: Pirate Parties International
- European political alliance: European Pirate Party
- Local Government: 2 / 9,137

Website
- pirates.cat

Pirates of Catalonia (Catalan: Pirates de Catalunya, PIRATA.CAT) is a political party in Catalonia. The party is based on the model of the Swedish Pirate Party and is a member of the Pirate Parties International, it supports intellectual property reform, open access to culture and knowledge, transparency and direct democracy.

The party was founded in August 2010 and was officially registered as a political party in October. The party contested for the first time in an election for the 2010 Catalan election, held on 28 November 2010, where it got 6.489 votes (0,21%). The party held its first assembly on 22 December 2010 in Barcelona.

== Electoral results ==
=== Cortes Generales ===
Cortes Generales
Election	Congress							Senate		Status
Election	Vote	%	Score	% (Note: In Catalonia.)	Score	Seats	+/–	Seats	+/–	Status
2011	21,876	0.09	23rd	0.63	10th	0 / 47	—	0 / 16	—	None
2015	Did not run					0 / 47	0	0 / 16	0	None
2016	Did not run					0 / 47	0	0 / 16	0	None
Apr. 2019	With Front Republicà					0 / 47	0	0 / 16	0	None
Nov. 2019	With CUP					2 / 47	2	0 / 16	0	Opposition
2023	Did not run					0 / 47	▼2	0 / 16	0	None

=== Parliament of Catalonia ===
The Pirates have never won any seats in the Parliament of Catalonia, but they have been in lists alongside the CUP which have won seats.

Parliament of Catalonia
Election	Vote	%	Score	Seats	+/–	Status
2010	6,451	0.21	15th	0 / 135	—	None
2012	18,219	0.50	12th	0 / 135	—	None
2015	327	0.01	11th	0 / 135	—	None
2017 (1)	195,246	4.46	6th	4 / 135	—	Confidence and supply
2021 (1)	189,924	6.68	6th	9 / 135		Confidence and supply
2024	Did not run					None

=== Local elections ===
The party ran candidates in local elections in May 2011. It gained two municipal councillors, one in Sant Fruitós de Bages and another in Santa Coloma de Gramenet. They tripled results in Barcelona, from 1767 votes (0.25%) to 4659 (0.77%). In l'Hospitalet, they increased from 0.24% to 0.99%. In Lleida from 0.23% to 0.80%. In Mataró, of 0.20% to 1.19%, and Mollet, from 0.20% to 0.83%

Council	Votes	Valid percent	Seats
Barcelona	4.659	0,77%	0
L'Hospitalet de Llobregat	837	0,99%	0
Lleida	360	0,80%	0
Mataró	530	1,19%	0
Mollet del Vallès	144	0,83%	0
Reus (1)	1.918	5,11%	0
Santa Coloma de Gramanet (2)	2.575	6,65%	1
Sant Fruitós de Bages (3)	384	11,66%	1
Tarragona (1)	1.099	2,28%	0

(1) In the candidates list of Candidatura d'Unitat Popular.
(2) In coalition with Gent de Gramenet.
(3) In coalition with Imagina't Sant Fruitós - AM.

== See also ==
- List of political parties in Catalonia
- Pirate Party (Spain)
