= Poble Lliure =

Poble Lliure Free People
- Founded: 2014
- Preceded by: Movement for Defence of the Land
- Headquarters: C/ del Túria, 58 - València; C/ Elisi, 20 - Barcelona
- Youth wing: La Forja
- Ideology: Democratic socialism Catalan independence Feminism; Catalan Countries
- Political position: Left-wing
- National affiliation: Front Republicà (2019)
- Regional affiliation: Popular Unity Candidacy (CUP–DT)

Website
- poblelliure.cat

Poble Lliure (English: Free People) is a Catalan socialist and pro-independence political organisation, which is part of the Pro Independence Catalan Left. Poble Lliure was founded in November 2014 from historical militants of the Movement for Defence of the Land (MDT) and independents linked to social movements. Poble Lliure supports the Front Republicà, the Candidatura d'Unitat Popular and the Assemblea Nacional Catalana (ANC).
