= Results of the 1977 Spanish Congress election =

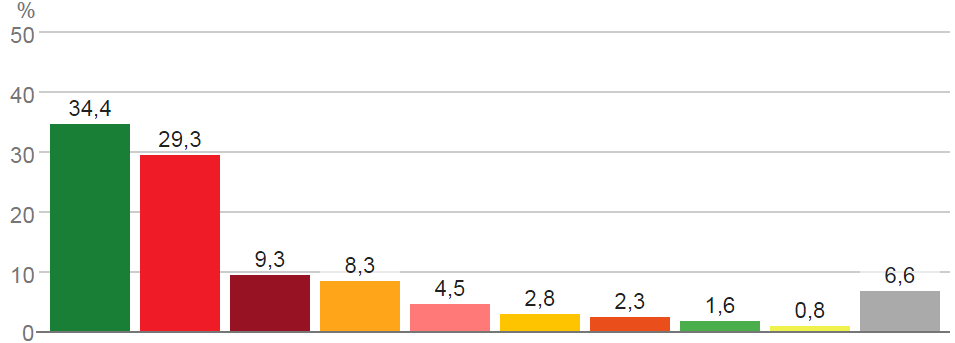
(Spain)	Main: 1977 Spanish general election
← 1936 15 June 1977 1979 →
Party		Votes	%	Seats
	UCD	6,310,391	34.4%	165
	PSOE	5,371,866	29.3%	118
	PCE	1,709,890	9.3%	20
	AP	1,526,671	8.3%	16
	PSP–US	828,461	4.5%	6
	PDC	514,647	2.8%	11
	EDCEE	417,678	2.3%	2
	EAJ/PNV	296,193	1.6%	8
	EC–FED	143,954	0.8%	1
	Others	1,204,582	6.6%	3
Total		18,324,333	100.0%	350

This article presents the results breakdown of the election to the Congress of Deputies held in Spain on 15 June 1977. The following tables show detailed results in each of the country's 17 autonomous communities and in the autonomous cities of Ceuta and Melilla, as well as a summary of constituency and regional results. (Note: This territorial division is based on the autonomic system established under the Spanish Constitution of 1978, as opposed to the regional division established in 1833. Most autonomous communities would be constituted by the time of the 1982 election, with the rest being established in early 1983. The autonomous cities of Ceuta and Melilla would not be constituted as independent administrative entities until 1995.)

== Nationwide ==
Summary of the 15 June 1977 Congress of Deputies election results →
Parties and alliances	Popular vote			Seats	
Parties and alliances	Votes	%	±pp	Total	+/−
Union of the Democratic Centre (UCD)	6,310,391	34.44	n/a	165	n/a
Spanish Socialist Workers' Party (PSOE)	5,371,866	29.32	n/a	118	n/a
Communist Party of Spain (PCE)	1,709,890	9.33	n/a	20	n/a
People's Alliance (AP)	1,526,671	8.33	n/a	16	n/a
People's Alliance (AP)	1,504,771	8.21	n/a	16	n/a
Navarrese Foral Alliance (AFN)	21,900	0.12	n/a	0	n/a
People's Socialist Party–Socialist Unity (PSP–US)	828,461	4.52	n/a	6	n/a
People's Socialist Party–Socialist Unity (PSP–US)	816,582	4.46	n/a	6	n/a
Centre-Left of Albacete (CIA)	11,879	0.06	n/a	0	n/a
Democratic Pact for Catalonia (PDC)	514,647	2.81	n/a	11	n/a
Christian Democratic Team of the Spanish State (EDCEE)	417,678	2.28	n/a	2	n/a
Federation of Christian Democracy (FPD–ID)	215,841	1.18	n/a	0	n/a
Union of the Centre and Christian Democracy of Catalonia (UCiDCC)	172,791	0.94	n/a	2	n/a
Basque Christian Democracy (DCV)	26,100	0.14	n/a	0	n/a
Democratic Union of the Balearic Islands (UDIB)	2,946	0.02	n/a	0	n/a
Basque Nationalist Party (EAJ/PNV)	296,193	1.62	n/a	8	n/a
Left of Catalonia–Democratic Electoral Front (EC–FED)	143,954	0.79	n/a	1	n/a
Democratic Socialist Alliance (PSOEh–PSDE)	126,944	0.69	n/a	0	n/a
Democratic Socialist Alliance (ASDCI)	101,916	0.56	n/a	0	n/a
Spanish Socialist Workers' Party (historical) (PSOEh)	21,242	0.12	n/a	0	n/a
Spanish Democratic Socialist Party (PSDE)	3,786	0.02	n/a	0	n/a
Democratic Left Front (FDI)	122,608	0.67	n/a	0	n/a
National Alliance July 18 (AN18)	97,894	0.53	n/a	0	n/a
National Alliance July 18 (AN18)	67,336	0.37	n/a	0	n/a
Spanish Phalanx of the CNSO (FE–JONS)	25,017	0.14	n/a	0	n/a
New Force (FN)	5,541	0.03	n/a	0	n/a
Basque Country Left–Navarrese Left Union (EE–UNAI)	85,906	0.47	n/a	1	n/a
Basque Country Left (EE)	61,417	0.34	n/a	1	n/a
Navarrese Left Union (UNAI)	24,489	0.13	n/a	0	n/a
Workers' Electoral Group (AET)	77,575	0.42	n/a	0	n/a
Spanish Social Reform (RSE)	64,241	0.35	n/a	0	n/a
Spanish Phalanx of the CNSO (Authentic) (FE–JONS(A))	46,548	0.25	n/a	0	n/a
Front for Workers' Unity (FUT)	41,208	0.22	n/a	0	n/a
Centre Independent Aragonese Candidacy (CAIC)	37,183	0.20	n/a	1	n/a
Basque Socialist Party (ESB/PSV)	36,002	0.20	n/a	0	n/a
Communist Movement (MC)^{1}	34,588	0.19	n/a	0	n/a
Popular Unity for Socialism Candidacy (CUPS)	12,040	0.07	n/a	0	n/a
Regionalist Unity (UR)	10,821	0.06	n/a	0	n/a
Popular Unity Candidates (CUP)	5,206	0.03	n/a	0	n/a
Aragonese Autonomist Front (FAA)	4,791	0.03	n/a	0	n/a
Regionalist Left Unitary Candidacy (CUIR)	1,504	0.01	n/a	0	n/a
Left Andalusian Bloc (BAI)	226	0.00	n/a	0	n/a
Socialist Party of the Valencian Country (PSPV)	31,138	0.17	n/a	0	n/a
Centre Independent Candidacy (CIC)	29,834	0.16	n/a	1	n/a
Galician Socialist Party (PSG)	27,197	0.15	n/a	0	n/a
Galician National-Popular Bloc (BNPG)	22,771	0.12	n/a	0	n/a
Andalusian Regional Unity (URA)	21,350	0.12	n/a	0	n/a
League of Catalonia–Catalan Liberal Party (LC–PLC)	20,109	0.11	n/a	0	n/a
National Association for the Study of Current Problems (ANEPA–CP)	18,113	0.10	n/a	0	n/a
Navarrese Autonomist Union (PNV–ANV–ESB)	18,079	0.10	n/a	0	n/a
United Canarian People (PCU)	17,717	0.10	n/a	0	n/a
Basque Independent Democrats (DIV)	15,505	0.08	n/a	0	n/a
Balearic Autonomist Union (UAB)	11,914	0.07	n/a	0	n/a
Independent Navarrese Front (FNI)	10,606	0.06	n/a	0	n/a
Canarian People's Party (PPCan)	9,650	0.05	n/a	0	n/a
Social Christian Democracy of Catalonia (DSCC)	9,157	0.05	n/a	0	n/a
Socialist Movement (MS)	8,741	0.05	n/a	0	n/a
Montejurra–Federalism–Self-Management (MFA)	8,461	0.05	n/a	0	n/a
Agrarian Social Action (ASA)	8,439	0.05	n/a	0	n/a
José Antonio Circles (CJA)	8,184	0.04	n/a	0	n/a
Independent Candidacy (INDEP)	6,472	0.04	n/a	0	n/a
Basque Nationalist Action (EAE/ANV)	6,435	0.04	n/a	0	n/a
Congress Independent Candidacy for Girona (CICPG)	6,411	0.03	n/a	0	n/a
Independent (INDEP)	6,158	0.03	n/a	0	n/a
Aragonese Christian Democracy (DCAR)	6,014	0.03	n/a	0	n/a
Riojan Independent Candidacy (CIR)	5,682	0.03	n/a	0	n/a
Socialist Party of Canaries (PSCan)	5,110	0.03	n/a	0	n/a
Independent Party of Madrid (PIM)	4,814	0.03	n/a	0	n/a
Proverist Party (PPr)	4,590	0.03	n/a	0	n/a
Independent (INDEP)	4,530	0.02	n/a	0	n/a
United Canarian Left (ICU)	4,118	0.02	n/a	0	n/a
Galician Democratic Party (PDG)	3,196	0.02	n/a	0	n/a
Independent Candidacy (INDEP)	2,737	0.01	n/a	0	n/a
Labour Federation (FL)	2,631	0.01	n/a	0	n/a
Independent (INDEP)	2,622	0.01	n/a	0	n/a
Riojan Independent Group (GIR)	2,399	0.01	n/a	0	n/a
Independent (INDEP)	2,347	0.01	n/a	0	n/a
Valencia Socialist Radical Party (PRSV)	2,345	0.01	n/a	0	n/a
Carlist Electors of the Valencian Country (ECPV)	2,252	0.01	n/a	0	n/a
Independent Candidacy (INDEP)	1,684	0.01	n/a	0	n/a
City and Country Independent Electoral Group (AEICC)	1,623	0.01	n/a	0	n/a
Small Business Independent Candidates (CIPYE)	1,480	0.01	n/a	0	n/a
Association of Ceuta Electors (ADEC)	1,099	0.01	n/a	0	n/a
Group of Carlist Electors (ADC)	938	0.01	n/a	0	n/a
Independent Spanish Phalanx (FEI)	855	0.00	n/a	0	n/a
Spanish Agrarian Party (PAE)	833	0.00	n/a	0	n/a
Independent Liberal Party (PLI)	805	0.00	n/a	0	n/a
Independent (INDEP)	492	0.00	n/a	0	n/a
Left Andalusian Candidacy (CAI)	0	0.00	n/a	0	n/a
Blank ballots	46,248	0.25	n/a		
Total	18,324,333			350	n/a
Valid votes	18,324,333	98.57	n/a		
Invalid votes	265,797	1.43	n/a		
Votes cast / turnout	18,590,130	78.83	n/a		
Abstentions	4,993,632	21.17	n/a		
Registered voters	23,583,762				
Sources
Footnotes: ^{1} The Communist Movement did not contest the election under its label, but ran scattered across different candidacies instead.

== Summary ==
=== Constituencies ===

Summary of constituency results in the 15 June 1977 Congress of Deputies election
Constituency	UCD		PSOE		PCE		AP		PSP–US		PDC		EDCEE		PNV		EC–FED		EE		CAIC		CIC	
Constituency	%	S	%	S	%	S	%	S	%	S	%	S	%	S	%	S	%	S	%	S	%	S	%	S
Álava	30.9	2	27.6	1	3.1	−	6.4	−	1.4	−			2.8	−	17.5	1								
Albacete	38.1	2	33.2	2	8.0	−	9.4	−	7.0	−														
Alicante	35.9	4	38.8	4	9.2	1	6.5	−	3.9	−			1.5	−										
Almería	49.7	3	27.4	2	6.4	−	8.0	−	3.1	−			3.0	−										
Ávila	68.2	3	14.3	−	2.3	−	6.8	−	1.7	−			4.6	−										
Badajoz	46.6	4	33.8	3	6.9	−	6.9	−	1.7	−			1.0	−										
Balearics	51.9	4	23.3	2	4.5	−	9.0	−	5.2	−			0.9	−										
Barcelona	15.1	5	30.5	11	19.9	7	3.2	1	1.8	−	15.4	6	5.4	2			4.8	1						
Biscay	16.4	2	25.3	3	5.4	−	6.6	1	2.2	−			1.1	−	30.9	4			5.4	−				
Burgos	48.0	3	23.8	1	2.6	−	15.4	−	3.2	−			1.6	−										
Cáceres	55.3	4	26.2	1	3.2	−	9.3	−	2.0	−														
Cádiz	27.3	2	36.5	4	10.1	1	4.9	−	9.7	1			1.3	−										
Castellón	35.3	2	29.4	2	5.9	−	6.1	−	2.7	−			2.3	−									12.5	1
Ceuta	36.3	1	32.5	−			12.0	−	11.4	−														
Ciudad Real	41.3	3	32.1	2	6.3	−	12.6	−	5.5	−														
Córdoba	32.5	3	33.8	3	16.5	1	9.3	−	3.6	−			0.8	−										
Cuenca	55.9	3	22.5	1	6.3	−	8.1	−	1.5	−			1.3	−										
Gerona	18.4	1	24.7	2	10.0	−	3.2	−	0.7	−	27.3	2	5.4	−			2.5	−						
Granada	43.8	4	32.1	3	9.7	−	7.1	−	3.6	−			0.9	−										
Guadalajara	48.7	2	21.2	1	6.8	−	15.9	−	2.7	−														
Guipúzcoa			28.1	3	3.6	−	8.2	−	1.5	−			5.0	−	30.9	3			9.4	1				
Huelva	47.8	3	33.7	2	5.5	−	5.0	−	2.6	−			1.4	−										
Huesca	45.6	2	27.5	1	6.0	−	5.9	−	11.2	−			2.4	−										
Jaén	33.0	3	39.4	4	9.5	−	8.4	−	2.1	−			1.0	−										
La Coruña	49.2	6	17.4	2	3.7	−	11.1	1	5.3	−			2.8	−										
Las Palmas	66.0	5	14.0	1	2.6	−	5.6	−	2.5	−														
León	50.9	4	24.0	1	4.6	−	12.3	1	3.4	−			1.6	−										
Lérida	24.3	1	15.0	1	12.2	−	5.4	−			24.4	2	9.5	−			7.6	−						
Logroño	41.3	2	26.3	1	2.8	−	14.5	1	2.3	−			2.6	−										
Lugo	51.8	4	12.4	−	1.8	−	21.7	1	5.6	−														
Madrid	32.0	11	31.7	11	10.7	4	10.5	3	9.2	3			1.5	−										
Málaga	26.6	3	42.6	4	11.7	1	8.0	−	5.1	−			0.9	−										
Melilla	56.3	1	27.1	−	5.1	−	10.9	−																
Murcia	40.7	4	34.9	4	6.7	−	6.8	−	5.1	−			2.1	−										
Navarre	29.0	3	21.2	2	2.4	−	8.5	−	2.6	−			4.0	−	7.0	−			9.5	−				
Orense	61.7	4	13.1	−	1.6	−	13.3	1	1.5	−			2.1	−										
Oviedo	30.9	4	31.7	4	10.5	1	13.5	1	7.1	−			0.6	−										
Palencia	50.5	2	25.4	1	3.7	−	14.3	−	3.0	−														
Pontevedra	56.8	6	15.7	1	3.4	−	11.5	1	5.0	−			2.0	−										
Salamanca	56.1	3	22.8	1	2.8	−	7.9	−	6.1	−			2.7	−										
Santa Cruz de Tenerife	53.2	5	19.3	2	4.0	−	10.6	−	5.4	−														
Santander	40.1	3	26.4	1	5.4	−	14.3	1	2.7	−			2.3	−										
Segovia	58.8	2	21.3	1	2.5	−	8.7	−	6.2	−														
Seville	32.6	5	36.7	5	13.4	2	6.3	−	4.9	−			1.0	−										
Soria	58.6	3	17.8	−	2.0	−	6.3	−	4.8	−			2.2	−										
Tarragona	27.3	2	23.7	1	16.4	1	6.0	−			14.7	1	5.6	−			4.3	−						
Teruel	50.2	2	17.6	1	2.6	−	16.3	−	3.6	−														
Toledo	38.3	2	31.6	2	8.3	−	16.6	1	1.6	−														
Valencia	31.0	5	36.6	7	9.8	1	5.6	1	5.4	1			3.2	−										
Valladolid	42.4	3	31.1	2	6.4	−	8.4	−	2.6	−			2.8	−										
Zamora	46.6	2	20.2	1	2.1	−	23.6	1	2.0	−			3.9	−										
Zaragoza	31.8	3	25.5	3	5.1	−	8.0	−	10.7	1			1.4	−							8.5	1		
Total	34.4	165	29.3	118	9.3	20	8.3	16	4.5	6	2.8	11	2.3	2	1.7	8	0.8	1	0.5	1	0.2	1	0.2	1

=== Regions ===

Summary of regional results in the 15 June 1977 Congress of Deputies election
Region	UCD		PSOE		PCE		AP		PSP–US		PDC		EDCEE		PNV		EC–FED		EE		CAIC		CIC	
Region	%	S	%	S	%	S	%	S	%	S	%	S	%	S	%	S	%	S	%	S	%	S	%	S
Andalusia	34.4	26	36.2	27	11.3	5	7.1	−	4.7	1			1.1	−										
Aragon	37.0	7	24.8	5	5.0	−	8.8	−	9.8	1			1.4	−							5.7	1		
Asturias	30.9	4	31.7	4	10.5	1	13.5	1	7.1	−			0.6	−										
Balearics	51.9	4	23.3	2	4.5	−	9.0	−	5.2	−			0.9	−										
Basque Country	12.8	4	26.5	7	4.5	−	7.1	1	1.8	−			2.6	−	29.3	8			6.1	1				
Canary Islands	59.9	10	16.6	3	3.3	−	8.0	−	3.9	−														
Cantabria	40.1	3	26.4	1	5.4	−	14.3	1	2.7	−			2.3	−										
Castile and León	51.4	25	23.6	8	3.7	−	11.7	2	3.6	−			2.2	−										
Castilla–La Mancha	42.5	12	29.8	8	7.3	−	12.9	1	3.8	−			0.2	−										
Catalonia	16.9	9	28.6	15	18.3	8	3.6	1	1.4	−	16.9	11	5.7	2			4.7	1						
Ceuta	36.3	1	32.5	−			12.0	−	11.4	−														
Extremadura	50.0	8	30.8	4	5.4	−	7.8	−	1.9	−			0.6	−										
Galicia	53.8	20	15.5	3	3.0	−	13.1	4	4.7	−			2.0	−										
La Rioja	41.3	2	26.3	1	2.8	−	14.5	1	2.3	−			2.6	−										
Madrid	32.0	11	31.7	11	10.7	4	10.5	3	9.2	3			1.5	−										
Melilla	56.3	1	27.1	−	5.1	−	10.9	−																
Murcia	40.7	4	34.9	4	6.7	−	6.8	−	5.1	−			2.1	−										
Navarre	29.0	3	21.2	2	2.4	−	8.5	−	2.6	−			4.0	−	7.0	−			9.5	−				
Valencian Community	33.0	11	36.3	13	9.1	2	5.9	1	4.6	1			2.6	−									1.6	1
Total	34.4	165	29.3	118	9.3	20	8.3	16	4.5	6	2.8	11	2.3	2	1.7	8	0.8	1	0.5	1	0.2	1	0.2	1

== Autonomous communities ==
=== Andalusia ===
Summary of the 15 June 1977 Congress of Deputies election results in Andalusia →
Parties and alliances	Popular vote			Seats	
Parties and alliances	Votes	%	±pp	Total	+/−
Spanish Socialist Workers' Party (PSOE)	1,059,037	36.16	n/a	27	n/a
Union of the Democratic Centre (UCD)	1,006,759	34.37	n/a	26	n/a
Communist Party of Spain (PCE)	330,250	11.28	n/a	5	n/a
People's Alliance (AP)	207,034	7.07	n/a	0	n/a
People's Socialist Party–Socialist Unity (PSP–US)	138,551	4.73	n/a	1	n/a
Democratic Left Front (FDI)	46,249	1.58	n/a	0	n/a
Federation of Christian Democracy (FPD–ID)	32,997	1.13	n/a	0	n/a
Andalusian Regional Unity (URA)	21,350	0.73	n/a	0	n/a
Spanish Social Reform (RSE)	16,136	0.55	n/a	0	n/a
Democratic Socialist Alliance (ASDCI)	13,910	0.47	n/a	0	n/a
Agrarian Social Action (ASA)	8,439	0.29	n/a	0	n/a
Andalusian Socialist Movement (MSA)	7,558	0.26	n/a	0	n/a
Independent Candidacy (INDEP)	6,472	0.22	n/a	0	n/a
National Association for the Study of Current Problems (ANEPA–CP)	4,759	0.16	n/a	0	n/a
Workers' Electoral Group (AET)	4,710	0.16	n/a	0	n/a
National Alliance July 18 (AN18)	4,690	0.16	n/a	0	n/a
Spanish Phalanx of the CNSO (Authentic) (FE–JONS(A))	3,662	0.13	n/a	0	n/a
Spanish Phalanx of the CNSO (FE–JONS)	1,979	0.07	n/a	0	n/a
Front for Workers' Unity (FUT)	1,717	0.06	n/a	0	n/a
Independent Candidacy (INDEP)	1,684	0.06	n/a	0	n/a
Small Business Independent Candidates (CIPYE)	1,480	0.05	n/a	0	n/a
José Antonio Circles (CJA)	1,308	0.04	n/a	0	n/a
Spanish Agrarian Party (PAE)	833	0.03	n/a	0	n/a
Independent Liberal Party (PLI)	596	0.02	n/a	0	n/a
Left Andalusian Bloc (BAI)	226	0.01	n/a	0	n/a
Left Andalusian Candidacy (CAI)	0	0.00	n/a	0	n/a
Blank ballots	6,535	0.22	n/a		
Total	2,928,921			59	n/a
Valid votes	2,928,921	98.79	n/a		
Invalid votes	35,728	1.21	n/a		
Votes cast / turnout	2,964,649	78.48	n/a		
Abstentions	813,125	21.52	n/a		
Registered voters	3,777,774				

=== Aragon ===
Summary of the 15 June 1977 Congress of Deputies election results in Aragon →
Parties and alliances	Popular vote			Seats	
Parties and alliances	Votes	%	±pp	Total	+/−
Union of the Democratic Centre (UCD)	241,232	37.00	n/a	7	n/a
Spanish Socialist Workers' Party (PSOE)	161,409	24.75	n/a	5	n/a
People's Socialist Party–Socialist Unity (PSP–US)	63,854	9.79	n/a	1	n/a
People's Alliance (AP)	57,260	8.78	n/a	0	n/a
Centre Independent Aragonese Candidacy (CAIC)	37,183	5.70	n/a	1	n/a
Communist Party of Spain (PCE)	32,286	4.95	n/a	0	n/a
Spanish Socialist Workers' Party (historical) (PSOEh)	12,328	1.89	n/a	0	n/a
Democratic Left Front (FDI)	9,611	1.47	n/a	0	n/a
Federation of Christian Democracy (FPD–ID)	9,100	1.40	n/a	0	n/a
Independent (INDEP)	6,158	0.94	n/a	0	n/a
Aragonese Christian Democracy (DCAR)	6,014	0.92	n/a	0	n/a
Aragonese Autonomist Front (FAA)	4,791	0.73	n/a	0	n/a
National Alliance July 18 (AN18)	1,934	0.30	n/a	0	n/a
Spanish Phalanx of the CNSO (Authentic) (FE–JONS(A))	1,929	0.30	n/a	0	n/a
Spanish Social Reform (RSE)	1,842	0.28	n/a	0	n/a
Workers' Electoral Group (AET)	1,713	0.26	n/a	0	n/a
José Antonio Circles (CJA)	729	0.11	n/a	0	n/a
Independent Liberal Party (PLI)	209	0.03	n/a	0	n/a
Blank ballots	2,451	0.38	n/a		
Total	652,033			14	n/a
Valid votes	652,033	98.34	n/a		
Invalid votes	11,033	1.66	n/a		
Votes cast / turnout	663,066	81.57	n/a		
Abstentions	149,815	18.43	n/a		
Registered voters	812,881				

=== Asturias ===
Summary of the 15 June 1977 Congress of Deputies election results in Asturias →
Parties and alliances	Popular vote			Seats	
Parties and alliances	Votes	%	±pp	Total	+/−
Spanish Socialist Workers' Party (PSOE)	182,850	31.74	n/a	4	n/a
Union of the Democratic Centre (UCD)	177,843	30.87	n/a	4	n/a
People's Alliance (AP)	77,932	13.53	n/a	1	n/a
Communist Party of Spain (PCE)	60,297	10.47	n/a	1	n/a
People's Socialist Party–Socialist Unity (PSP–US)	40,807	7.08	n/a	0	n/a
Regionalist Unity (UR)	10,821	1.88	n/a	0	n/a
National Alliance July 18 (AN18)	8,245	1.43	n/a	0	n/a
Democratic Socialist Alliance (ASDCI)	5,947	1.03	n/a	0	n/a
Federation of Christian Democracy (FPD–ID)	3,438	0.60	n/a	0	n/a
Workers' Electoral Group (AET)	2,781	0.48	n/a	0	n/a
Spanish Phalanx of the CNSO (Authentic) (FE–JONS(A))	2,615	0.45	n/a	0	n/a
Front for Workers' Unity (FUT)	1,512	0.26	n/a	0	n/a
Blank ballots	1,012	0.18	n/a		
Total	576,100			10	n/a
Valid votes	576,100	98.64	n/a		
Invalid votes	7,961	1.36	n/a		
Votes cast / turnout	584,061	74.57	n/a		
Abstentions	199,145	25.43	n/a		
Registered voters	783,206				

=== Balearics ===
Summary of the 15 June 1977 Congress of Deputies election results in the Balearics →
Parties and alliances	Popular vote			Seats	
Parties and alliances	Votes	%	±pp	Total	+/−
Union of the Democratic Centre (UCD)	163,536	51.89	n/a	4	n/a
Spanish Socialist Workers' Party (PSOE)	73,554	23.34	n/a	2	n/a
People's Alliance (AP)	28,472	9.03	n/a	0	n/a
People's Socialist Party–Socialist Unity (PSP–US)	16,244	5.15	n/a	0	n/a
Communist Party of Spain (PCE)	14,046	4.46	n/a	0	n/a
Balearic Autonomist Union (UAB)	11,914	3.78	n/a	0	n/a
Democratic Union of the Balearic Islands (UDIB)	2,946	0.93	n/a	0	n/a
Spanish Social Reform (RSE)	1,067	0.34	n/a	0	n/a
Democratic Left Front (FDI)	775	0.25	n/a	0	n/a
Workers' Electoral Group (AET)	669	0.21	n/a	0	n/a
José Antonio Circles (CJA)	613	0.19	n/a	0	n/a
Blank ballots	1,311	0.42	n/a		
Total	315,147			6	n/a
Valid votes	315,147	98.01	n/a		
Invalid votes	6,405	1.99	n/a		
Votes cast / turnout	321,552	78.83	n/a		
Abstentions	86,374	21.17	n/a		
Registered voters	407,899				

=== Basque Country ===
Summary of the 15 June 1977 Congress of Deputies election results in the Basque Country →
Parties and alliances	Popular vote			Seats	
Parties and alliances	Votes	%	±pp	Total	+/−
Basque Nationalist Party (EAJ/PNV)	296,193	29.28	n/a	8	n/a
Socialist Party of the Basque Country (PSE–PSOE)	267,897	26.48	n/a	7	n/a
Union of the Democratic Centre (UCD)	129,600	12.81	n/a	4	n/a
People's Alliance (AP)	71,909	7.11	n/a	1	n/a
Basque Country Left (EE)	61,417	6.07	n/a	1	n/a
Communist Party of the Basque Country (PCE/EPK)	45,916	4.54	n/a	0	n/a
Basque Socialist Party (ESB/PSV)	36,002	3.56	n/a	0	n/a
Basque Christian Democracy (DCV)	26,100	2.58	n/a	0	n/a
People's Socialist Party–Socialist Unity (PSP–US)	18,556	1.83	n/a	0	n/a
Basque Independent Democrats (DIV)	15,505	1.53	n/a	0	n/a
Democratic Socialist Alliance (ASDCI)	9,548	0.94	n/a	0	n/a
Front for Workers' Unity (FUT)	8,308	0.82	n/a	0	n/a
Basque Nationalist Action (EAE/ANV)	6,435	0.64	n/a	0	n/a
Workers' Electoral Group (AET)	5,301	0.52	n/a	0	n/a
Democratic Left Front (FDI)	4,617	0.46	n/a	0	n/a
Independent (INDEP)	2,622	0.26	n/a	0	n/a
Independent (INDEP)	2,347	0.23	n/a	0	n/a
Independent (INDEP)	492	0.05	n/a	0	n/a
Spanish Phalanx of the CNSO (Authentic) (FE–JONS(A))	216	0.02	n/a	0	n/a
Proverist Party (PPr)	180	0.02	n/a	0	n/a
Montejurra–Federalism–Self-Management (MFA)	10	0.00	n/a	0	n/a
Blank ballots	2,568	0.25	n/a		
Total	1,011,739			21	n/a
Valid votes	1,011,739	97.75	n/a		
Invalid votes	23,289	2.25	n/a		
Votes cast / turnout	1,035,028	77.23	n/a		
Abstentions	305,216	22.77	n/a		
Registered voters	1,340,244				

=== Canary Islands ===
Summary of the 15 June 1977 Congress of Deputies election results in the Canary Islands →
Parties and alliances	Popular vote			Seats	
Parties and alliances	Votes	%	±pp	Total	+/−
Union of the Democratic Centre (UCD)	327,491	59.85	n/a	10	n/a
Spanish Socialist Workers' Party (PSOE)	90,567	16.55	n/a	3	n/a
People's Alliance (AP)	43,772	8.00	n/a	0	n/a
People's Socialist Party–Socialist Unity (PSP–US)	21,345	3.90	n/a	0	n/a
Communist Party of the Canaries (PCC–PCE)	18,110	3.31	n/a	0	n/a
United Canarian People (PCU)	17,717	3.24	n/a	0	n/a
Canarian People's Party (PPCan)	9,650	1.76	n/a	0	n/a
Socialist Party of Canaries (PSCan)	5,110	0.93	n/a	0	n/a
Spanish Phalanx of the CNSO (Authentic) (FE–JONS(A))	4,916	0.90	n/a	0	n/a
United Canarian Left (ICU)	4,118	0.75	n/a	0	n/a
Democratic Left Front (FDI)	1,476	0.27	n/a	0	n/a
Spanish Social Reform (RSE)	1,154	0.21	n/a	0	n/a
Blank ballots	1,717	0.31	n/a		
Total	547,143			13	n/a
Valid votes	547,143	98.15	n/a		
Invalid votes	10,301	1.85	n/a		
Votes cast / turnout	557,444	73.08	n/a		
Abstentions	205,351	26.92	n/a		
Registered voters	762,795				

=== Cantabria ===
Summary of the 15 June 1977 Congress of Deputies election results in Cantabria →
Parties and alliances	Popular vote			Seats	
Parties and alliances	Votes	%	±pp	Total	+/−
Union of the Democratic Centre (UCD)	102,719	40.06	n/a	3	n/a
Spanish Socialist Workers' Party (PSOE)	67,611	26.37	n/a	1	n/a
People's Alliance (AP)	36,598	14.27	n/a	1	n/a
Communist Party of Spain (PCE)	13,971	5.45	n/a	0	n/a
Spanish Socialist Workers' Party (historical) (PSOEh)	8,914	3.48	n/a	0	n/a
People's Socialist Party–Socialist Unity (PSP–US)	6,923	2.70	n/a	0	n/a
Federation of Christian Democracy (FPD–ID)	5,930	2.31	n/a	0	n/a
Spanish Democratic Socialist Party (PSDE)	3,786	1.48	n/a	0	n/a
National Alliance July 18 (AN18)	3,582	1.40	n/a	0	n/a
Workers' Electoral Group (AET)	2,551	0.99	n/a	0	n/a
Spanish Phalanx of the CNSO (Authentic) (FE–JONS(A))	1,797	0.70	n/a	0	n/a
Democratic Left Front (FDI)	1,633	0.64	n/a	0	n/a
Blank ballots	391	0.15	n/a		
Total	256,406			5	n/a
Valid votes	256,406	97.12	n/a		
Invalid votes	7,591	2.88	n/a		
Votes cast / turnout	263,997	80.73	n/a		
Abstentions	63,011	19.27	n/a		
Registered voters	327,008				

=== Castile and León ===
Summary of the 15 June 1977 Congress of Deputies election results in Castile and León →
Parties and alliances	Popular vote			Seats	
Parties and alliances	Votes	%	±pp	Total	+/−
Union of the Democratic Centre (UCD)	709,303	51.43	n/a	25	n/a
Spanish Socialist Workers' Party (PSOE)	325,684	23.61	n/a	8	n/a
People's Alliance (AP)	161,409	11.70	n/a	2	n/a
Communist Party of Spain (PCE)	50,775	3.68	n/a	0	n/a
People's Socialist Party–Socialist Unity (PSP–US)	49,083	3.56	n/a	0	n/a
Federation of Christian Democracy (FPD–ID)	30,790	2.23	n/a	0	n/a
Democratic Left Front (FDI)	10,677	0.77	n/a	0	n/a
Democratic Socialist Alliance (ASDCI)	7,027	0.51	n/a	0	n/a
National Alliance July 18 (AN18)	6,318	0.46	n/a	0	n/a
Independent (INDEP)	4,530	0.33	n/a	0	n/a
Spanish Phalanx of the CNSO (Authentic) (FE–JONS(A))	4,434	0.32	n/a	0	n/a
Workers' Electoral Group (AET)	3,146	0.23	n/a	0	n/a
Spanish Social Reform (RSE)	2,810	0.20	n/a	0	n/a
City and Country Independent Electoral Group (AEICC)	1,623	0.12	n/a	0	n/a
Regionalist Left Unitary Candidacy (CUIR)	1,504	0.11	n/a	0	n/a
Socialist Movement (MS)	1,183	0.09	n/a	0	n/a
New Force (FN)	1,132	0.08	n/a	0	n/a
Front for Workers' Unity (FUT)	964	0.07	n/a	0	n/a
Group of Carlist Electors (ADC)	938	0.07	n/a	0	n/a
National Association for the Study of Current Problems (ANEPA–CP)	616	0.04	n/a	0	n/a
Blank ballots	5,342	0.39	n/a		
Total	1,379,288			35	n/a
Valid votes	1,379,288	98.29	n/a		
Invalid votes	23,965	1.71	n/a		
Votes cast / turnout	1,403,253	80.92	n/a		
Abstentions	330,959	19.08	n/a		
Registered voters	1,734,212				

=== Castilla–La Mancha ===
Summary of the 15 June 1977 Congress of Deputies election results in Castilla–La Mancha →
Parties and alliances	Popular vote			Seats	
Parties and alliances	Votes	%	±pp	Total	+/−
Union of the Democratic Centre (UCD)	378,727	42.53	n/a	12	n/a
Spanish Socialist Workers' Party (PSOE)	265,486	29.81	n/a	8	n/a
People's Alliance (AP)	114,498	12.86	n/a	1	n/a
Communist Party of Spain (PCE)	64,575	7.25	n/a	0	n/a
People's Socialist Party–Socialist Unity (PSP–US)	33,843	3.80	n/a	0	n/a
People's Socialist Party–Socialist Unity (PSP–US)^{1}	21,964	2.47	n/a	0	n/a
Centre-Left of Albacete (CIA)	11,879	1.33	n/a	0	n/a
National Alliance July 18 (AN18)	9,741	1.09	n/a	0	n/a
Spanish Phalanx of the CNSO (FE–JONS)	7,928	0.89	n/a	0	n/a
Democratic Left Front (FDI)	4,989	0.56	n/a	0	n/a
Spanish Social Reform (RSE)	2,024	0.23	n/a	0	n/a
Spanish Phalanx of the CNSO (Authentic) (FE–JONS(A))	1,936	0.22	n/a	0	n/a
Federation of Christian Democracy (FPD–ID)^{1}	1,646	0.18	n/a	0	n/a
Democratic Socialist Alliance (ASDCI)	1,485	0.17	n/a	0	n/a
New Force (FN)	1,219	0.14	n/a	0	n/a
José Antonio Circles (CJA)	419	0.05	n/a	0	n/a
Independent Spanish Phalanx (FEI)	129	0.01	n/a	0	n/a
Blank ballots	1,896	0.21	n/a		
Total	890,541			21	n/a
Valid votes	890,541	98.85	n/a		
Invalid votes	10,355	1.15	n/a		
Votes cast / turnout	900,896	83.61	n/a		
Abstentions	176,655	16.39	n/a		
Registered voters	1,077,551				
Sources
Footnotes: ^{1} People's Socialist Party–Socialist Unity and Federation of Christian Democracy do not include results in Albacete, where they supported Centre-Left of Albacete.

=== Catalonia ===
Summary of the 15 June 1977 Congress of Deputies election results in Catalonia →
Parties and alliances	Popular vote			Seats	
Parties and alliances	Votes	%	±pp	Total	+/−
Socialists of Catalonia (PSC–PSOE)	870,362	28.56	n/a	15	n/a
Unified Socialist Party of Catalonia (PSUC–PCE)	558,132	18.31	n/a	8	n/a
Union of the Democratic Centre (UCD)	515,293	16.91	n/a	9	n/a
Democratic Pact for Catalonia (PDC)	514,647	16.88	n/a	11	n/a
Union of the Centre and Christian Democracy of Catalonia (UCiDCC)	172,791	5.67	n/a	2	n/a
Left of Catalonia–Democratic Electoral Front (EC–FED)	143,954	4.72	n/a	1	n/a
Catalan Coexistence–People's Alliance (CC–AP)	108,333	3.55	n/a	1	n/a
People's Socialist Party–Socialist Unity (PSP–US)	43,029	1.41	n/a	0	n/a
League of Catalonia–Catalan Liberal Party (LC–PLC)	20,109	0.66	n/a	0	n/a
Front for Workers' Unity (FUT)	17,167	0.56	n/a	0	n/a
Workers' Electoral Group (AET)	12,453	0.41	n/a	0	n/a
Popular Unity for Socialism Candidacy (CUPS)	12,040	0.40	n/a	0	n/a
Catalan Social Reform (RSC)	9,256	0.30	n/a	0	n/a
Social Christian Democracy of Catalonia (DSCC)	9,157	0.30	n/a	0	n/a
National Alliance July 18 (AN18)	8,895	0.29	n/a	0	n/a
Democratic Socialist Alliance (ASDCI)	8,738	0.29	n/a	0	n/a
Spanish Phalanx of the CNSO (Authentic) (FE–JONS(A))	7,111	0.23	n/a	0	n/a
Congress Independent Candidacy for Girona (CICPG)	6,411	0.21	n/a	0	n/a
Proverist Party (PPr)	4,410	0.14	n/a	0	n/a
Blank ballots	5,693	0.19	n/a		
Total	3,047,981			47	n/a
Valid votes	3,047,981	98.67	n/a		
Invalid votes	40,948	1.33	n/a		
Votes cast / turnout	3,088,929	79.54	n/a		
Abstentions	794,399	20.46	n/a		
Registered voters	3,883,328				

=== Extremadura ===
Summary of the 15 June 1977 Congress of Deputies election results in Extremadura →
Parties and alliances	Popular vote			Seats	
Parties and alliances	Votes	%	±pp	Total	+/−
Union of the Democratic Centre (UCD)	264,426	50.04	n/a	8	n/a
Spanish Socialist Workers' Party (PSOE)	162,624	30.78	n/a	4	n/a
People's Alliance (AP)	41,396	7.83	n/a	0	n/a
Communist Party of Spain (PCE)	28,729	5.44	n/a	0	n/a
People's Socialist Party–Socialist Unity (PSP–US)	9,807	1.86	n/a	0	n/a
Spanish Social Reform (RSE)	4,481	0.85	n/a	0	n/a
National Alliance July 18 (AN18)	3,512	0.66	n/a	0	n/a
Workers' Electoral Group (AET)	3,272	0.62	n/a	0	n/a
Federation of Christian Democracy (FPD–ID)	3,141	0.59	n/a	0	n/a
Democratic Left Front (FDI)	2,229	0.42	n/a	0	n/a
Spanish Phalanx of the CNSO (Authentic) (FE–JONS(A))	1,943	0.37	n/a	0	n/a
Democratic Socialist Alliance (ASDCI)	1,835	0.35	n/a	0	n/a
Blank ballots	994	0.19	n/a		
Total	528,389			12	n/a
Valid votes	528,389	98.81	n/a		
Invalid votes	6,348	1.19	n/a		
Votes cast / turnout	534,737	77.21	n/a		
Abstentions	157,828	22.79	n/a		
Registered voters	692,565				

=== Galicia ===
Summary of the 15 June 1977 Congress of Deputies election results in Galicia →
Parties and alliances	Popular vote			Seats	
Parties and alliances	Votes	%	±pp	Total	+/−
Union of the Democratic Centre (UCD)	606,726	53.76	n/a	20	n/a
Spanish Socialist Workers' Party (PSOE)	175,127	15.52	n/a	3	n/a
People's Alliance (AP)	148,239	13.13	n/a	4	n/a
People's Socialist Party–Socialist Unity (PSP–US)	53,067	4.70	n/a	0	n/a
Communist Party of Spain (PCE)	34,188	3.03	n/a	0	n/a
Galician Socialist Party (PSG)	27,197	2.41	n/a	0	n/a
Christian Democratic Team of the Spanish State (PGSD–PPG)	23,014	2.04	n/a	0	n/a
Galician National-Popular Bloc (BNPG)	22,771	2.02	n/a	0	n/a
Spanish Social Reform (RSE)	9,425	0.84	n/a	0	n/a
Democratic Left Front (FDI)	7,373	0.65	n/a	0	n/a
Democratic Socialist Alliance (ASDCI)	4,728	0.42	n/a	0	n/a
Galician Democratic Party (PDG)	3,196	0.28	n/a	0	n/a
Workers' Electoral Group (AET)	2,724	0.24	n/a	0	n/a
Front for Workers' Unity (FUT)	2,340	0.21	n/a	0	n/a
National Alliance July 18 (AN18)	2,116	0.19	n/a	0	n/a
Spanish Phalanx of the CNSO (Authentic) (FE–JONS(A))	1,640	0.15	n/a	0	n/a
Blank ballots	4,748	0.42	n/a		
Total	1,128,619			27	n/a
Valid votes	1,128,619	97.94	n/a		
Invalid votes	23,757	2.06	n/a		
Votes cast / turnout	1,152,376	60.73	n/a		
Abstentions	745,160	39.27	n/a		
Registered voters	1,897,536				

=== La Rioja ===
Summary of the 15 June 1977 Congress of Deputies election results in La Rioja →
Parties and alliances	Popular vote			Seats	
Parties and alliances	Votes	%	±pp	Total	+/−
Union of the Democratic Centre (UCD)	56,917	41.35	n/a	2	n/a
Spanish Socialist Workers' Party (PSOE)	36,186	26.29	n/a	1	n/a
People's Alliance (AP)	19,925	14.47	n/a	1	n/a
Riojan Independent Candidacy (CIR)	5,682	4.13	n/a	0	n/a
Communist Party of Spain (PCE)	3,846	2.79	n/a	0	n/a
Federation of Christian Democracy (FPD–ID)	3,593	2.61	n/a	0	n/a
People's Socialist Party–Socialist Unity (PSP–US)	3,188	2.32	n/a	0	n/a
Riojan Independent Group (GIR)	2,399	1.74	n/a	0	n/a
Workers' Electoral Group (AET)	1,986	1.44	n/a	0	n/a
Democratic Socialist Alliance (ASDCI)	1,936	1.41	n/a	0	n/a
Democratic Left Front (FDI)	1,006	0.73	n/a	0	n/a
Spanish Phalanx of the CNSO (Authentic) (FE–JONS(A))	639	0.46	n/a	0	n/a
Blank ballots	356	0.26	n/a		
Total	137,659			4	n/a
Valid votes	137,659	98.03	n/a		
Invalid votes	2,770	1.97	n/a		
Votes cast / turnout	140,429	84.07	n/a		
Abstentions	26,601	15.93	n/a		
Registered voters	167,030				

=== Madrid ===
Summary of the 15 June 1977 Congress of Deputies election results in Madrid →
Parties and alliances	Popular vote			Seats	
Parties and alliances	Votes	%	±pp	Total	+/−
Union of the Democratic Centre (UCD)	737,699	31.95	n/a	11	n/a
Spanish Socialist Workers' Party (PSOE)	731,380	31.68	n/a	11	n/a
Communist Party of Spain (PCE)	247,038	10.70	n/a	4	n/a
People's Alliance (AP)	242,077	10.48	n/a	3	n/a
People's Socialist Party–Socialist Unity (PSP–US)	211,440	9.16	n/a	3	n/a
Federation of Christian Democracy (FPD–ID)	34,113	1.48	n/a	0	n/a
Democratic Socialist Alliance (ASDCI)	28,363	1.23	n/a	0	n/a
Workers' Electoral Group (AET)	16,372	0.71	n/a	0	n/a
Spanish Phalanx of the CNSO (FE–JONS)	13,721	0.59	n/a	0	n/a
Democratic Left Front (FDI)	13,328	0.58	n/a	0	n/a
Spanish Phalanx of the CNSO (Authentic) (FE–JONS(A))	7,345	0.32	n/a	0	n/a
Popular Unity Candidates (CUP)	5,206	0.23	n/a	0	n/a
Independent Party of Madrid (PIM)	4,814	0.21	n/a	0	n/a
Spanish Social Reform (RSE)	4,344	0.19	n/a	0	n/a
Front for Workers' Unity (FUT)	3,264	0.14	n/a	0	n/a
José Antonio Circles (CJA)	2,301	0.10	n/a	0	n/a
Blank ballots	6,111	0.26	n/a		
Total	2,308,916			32	n/a
Valid votes	2,308,916	98.98	n/a		
Invalid votes	23,744	1.02	n/a		
Votes cast / turnout	2,332,660	85.00	n/a		
Abstentions	411,492	15.00	n/a		
Registered voters	2,744,152				

=== Murcia ===
Summary of the 15 June 1977 Congress of Deputies election results in Murcia →
Parties and alliances	Popular vote			Seats	
Parties and alliances	Votes	%	±pp	Total	+/−
Union of the Democratic Centre (UCD)	181,633	40.70	n/a	4	n/a
Spanish Socialist Workers' Party (PSOE)	155,871	34.93	n/a	4	n/a
People's Alliance (AP)	30,167	6.76	n/a	0	n/a
Communist Party of Spain (PCE)	29,840	6.69	n/a	0	n/a
People's Socialist Party–Socialist Unity (PSP–US)	22,627	5.07	n/a	0	n/a
Federation of Christian Democracy (FPD–ID)	9,166	2.05	n/a	0	n/a
Democratic Socialist Alliance (ASDCI)	5,886	1.32	n/a	0	n/a
Workers' Electoral Group (AET)	2,606	0.58	n/a	0	n/a
New Force (FN)	2,313	0.52	n/a	0	n/a
Spanish Social Reform (RSE)	2,291	0.51	n/a	0	n/a
Spanish Phalanx of the CNSO (Authentic) (FE–JONS(A))	1,668	0.37	n/a	0	n/a
Democratic Left Front (FDI)	1,544	0.35	n/a	0	n/a
Blank ballots	660	0.15	n/a		
Total	446,272			8	n/a
Valid votes	446,272	99.01	n/a		
Invalid votes	4,480	0.99	n/a		
Votes cast / turnout	450,752	81.80	n/a		
Abstentions	100,269	18.20	n/a		
Registered voters	551,021				

=== Navarre ===
Summary of the 15 June 1977 Congress of Deputies election results in Navarre →
Parties and alliances	Popular vote			Seats	
Parties and alliances	Votes	%	±pp	Total	+/−
Union of the Democratic Centre (UCD)	75,036	29.03	n/a	3	n/a
Spanish Socialist Workers' Party (PSOE)	54,720	21.17	n/a	2	n/a
Navarrese Left Union (UNAI)	24,489	9.47	n/a	0	n/a
Navarrese Foral Alliance (AFN)	21,900	8.47	n/a	0	n/a
Navarrese Autonomist Union (PNV–ANV–ESB)	18,079	6.99	n/a	0	n/a
Workers' Electoral Group (AET)	13,195	5.11	n/a	0	n/a
Independent Navarrese Front (FNI)	10,606	4.10	n/a	0	n/a
Federation of Christian Democracy (FPD–ID)	10,450	4.04	n/a	0	n/a
Montejurra–Federalism–Self-Management (MFA)	8,451	3.27	n/a	0	n/a
Democratic Left Front (FDI)	6,631	2.57	n/a	0	n/a
People's Socialist Party–Socialist Unity (PSP–US)	6,629	2.56	n/a	0	n/a
Communist Party of Spain (PCE)	6,319	2.44	n/a	0	n/a
Front for Workers' Unity (FUT)	1,361	0.53	n/a	0	n/a
Blank ballots	598	0.23	n/a		
Total	258,464			5	n/a
Valid votes	258,464	98.45	n/a		
Invalid votes	4,058	1.55	n/a		
Votes cast / turnout	262,522	82.24	n/a		
Abstentions	56,700	17.76	n/a		
Registered voters	319,222				

=== Valencian Community ===
Summary of the 15 June 1977 Congress of Deputies election results in the Valencian Community →
Parties and alliances	Popular vote			Seats	
Parties and alliances	Votes	%	±pp	Total	+/−
Spanish Socialist Workers' Party (PSOE)	678,429	36.33	n/a	13	n/a
Union of the Democratic Centre (UCD)	615,920	32.98	n/a	11	n/a
Communist Party of Spain (PCE)	170,606	9.14	n/a	2	n/a
People's Alliance (AP)	110,761	5.93	n/a	1	n/a
People's Socialist Party–Socialist Unity (PSP–US)	86,705	4.64	n/a	1	n/a
Christian Democratic Team of the Spanish State (FDC–UDPV)	48,463	2.60	n/a	0	n/a
Socialist Party of the Valencian Country (PSPV)	31,138	1.67	n/a	0	n/a
Centre Independent Candidacy (CIC)	29,834	1.60	n/a	1	n/a
National Alliance July 18 (AN18)	18,303	0.98	n/a	0	n/a
National Association for the Study of Current Problems (ANEPA–CP)	12,738	0.68	n/a	0	n/a
Democratic Socialist Alliance (ASDCI)	12,513	0.67	n/a	0	n/a
Democratic Left Front (FDI)	10,470	0.56	n/a	0	n/a
Spanish Social Reform (RSE)	8,659	0.46	n/a	0	n/a
Spanish Phalanx of the CNSO (Authentic) (FE–JONS(A))	4,697	0.25	n/a	0	n/a
Front for Workers' Unity (FUT)	4,575	0.24	n/a	0	n/a
Workers' Electoral Group (AET)	4,096	0.22	n/a	0	n/a
José Antonio Circles (CJA)	2,814	0.15	n/a	0	n/a
Independent Candidacy (INDEP)	2,737	0.15	n/a	0	n/a
Labour Federation (FL)	2,631	0.14	n/a	0	n/a
Valencia Socialist Radical Party (PRSV)	2,345	0.13	n/a	0	n/a
Carlist Electors of the Valencian Country (ECPV)	2,252	0.12	n/a	0	n/a
Spanish Phalanx of the CNSO (FE–JONS)	1,389	0.07	n/a	0	n/a
New Force (FN)	877	0.05	n/a	0	n/a
Independent Spanish Phalanx (FEI)	726	0.04	n/a	0	n/a
Blank ballots	3,691	0.20	n/a		
Total	1,867,369			29	n/a
Valid votes	1,867,369	98.81	n/a		
Invalid votes	22,541	1.19	n/a		
Votes cast / turnout	1,889,910	84.06	n/a		
Abstentions	358,388	15.94	n/a		
Registered voters	2,248,298				

== Autonomous cities ==
=== Ceuta ===
Summary of the 15 June 1977 Congress of Deputies election results in Ceuta →
Parties and alliances	Popular vote			Seats	
Parties and alliances	Votes	%	±pp	Total	+/−
Union of the Democratic Centre (UCD)	8,808	36.26	n/a	1	n/a
Spanish Socialist Workers' Party (PSOE)	7,886	32.47	n/a	0	n/a
Action for Ceuta (APC)	2,915	12.00	n/a	0	n/a
People's Socialist Party–Socialist Unity (PSP–US)	2,763	11.38	n/a	0	n/a
Association of Ceuta Electors (ADEC)	1,099	4.52	n/a	0	n/a
Spanish Social Reform (RSE)	752	3.10	n/a	0	n/a
Blank ballots	67	0.28	n/a		
Total	24,290			1	n/a
Valid votes	24,290	98.83	n/a		
Invalid votes	288	1.17	n/a		
Votes cast / turnout	24,578	77.60	n/a		
Abstentions	7,094	22.40	n/a		
Registered voters	31,672				

=== Melilla ===
Summary of the 15 June 1977 Congress of Deputies election results in Melilla →
Parties and alliances	Popular vote			Seats	
Parties and alliances	Votes	%	±pp	Total	+/−
Union of the Democratic Centre (UCD)	10,723	56.27	n/a	1	n/a
Spanish Socialist Workers' Party (PSOE)	5,168	27.12	n/a	0	n/a
People's Alliance (AP)	2,074	10.88	n/a	0	n/a
Communist Party of Spain (PCE)	966	5.07	n/a	0	n/a
Blank ballots	107	0.56	n/a		
Total	19,056			1	n/a
Valid votes	19,056	98.78	n/a		
Invalid votes	235	1.22	n/a		
Votes cast / turnout	19,291	76.04	n/a		
Abstentions	6,077	23.96	n/a		
Registered voters	25,368				
