= Opinion polling for the 1977 Spanish general election =

In the run up to the 1977 Spanish general election, various organisations carried out opinion polling to gauge voting intention in Spain during the term of the Constituent Cortes Generales. Results of such polls are displayed in this article. The date range for these opinion polls is to the day the election was held, on 15 June 1977.

Voting intention estimates refer mainly to a hypothetical Congress of Deputies election. Polls are listed in reverse chronological order, showing the most recent first and using the dates when the survey fieldwork was done, as opposed to the date of publication. Where the fieldwork dates are unknown, the date of publication is given instead. The highest percentage figure in each polling survey is displayed with its background shaded in the leading party's colour. If a tie ensues, this is applied to the figures with the highest percentages. The "Lead" columns on the right shows the percentage-point difference between the parties with the highest percentages in a poll.

== Electoral polling ==
=== Nationwide polling ===
==== Voting intention estimates ====
The table below lists nationwide voting intention estimates. Refusals are generally excluded from the party vote percentages, while question wording and the treatment of "don't know" responses and those not intending to vote may vary between polling organisations. When available, seat projections determined by the polling organisations are displayed below (or in place of) the percentages in a smaller font; 176 seats were required for an absolute majority in the Congress of Deputies.

Polling firm/Commissioner	Fieldwork date	Sample size	Turnout	UCD	PSOE	PCE	AP	PSP	PDC	EDCEE	PNV	EC–FED	ASD	FDI	AN18	EE	ESB	Lead
1977 general election	15 Jun 1977	—N/a	78.8	34.4; 165	29.3; 118	9.3; 20	8.3; 16	4.5; 6	2.8; 11	2.3; 2	1.6; 8	0.8; 1	0.7; 0	0.7; 0	0.6; 0	0.3; 1	0.2; 0	5.1
ANA/Europa Press	14 Jun 1977	1,825	80	31.4; 143	26.0; 104	8.1; 20	9.5; 32	6.6; 14	1.7; 6	6.4; 17	2.4; 8	–	–	–	–	–	–	5.4
ICSA–Gallup/Ya (Note: Undecided and/or abstentionists excluded.)	14 Jun 1977	1,200	91.8	28.9	32.6	6.5	6.4	5.4	2.7	4.4	2.0	–	0.7	3.4	0.6	–	–	3.7
Tecnia/Informaciones	11–12 Jun 1977	1,500	64.8	29.5	27.3	9.5	6.5	7.7	2.9	6.1	1.8	–	1.2	1.2	0.7	1.1	0.2	2.2
Alef/Cuadernos para el Diálogo	11 Jun 1977	?	?	33.7	20.0	10.8	11.3	8.0	–	11.4	–	–	–	3.0	1.8	–	–	13.7
Sofemasa/El País	6–8 Jun 1977	15,875	91.7	34.0; 141	27.0; 121	8.1; 28	9.2; 25	5.4; 11	1.5; 10	2.6; 3	1.0; 6	? 1	1.0; 1	0.7; 0	0.7; 0	? 1	? 2	7.0
ANA/Europa Press	28 May–2 Jun 1977	5,100	?	30.0; 130/153	20.7; 81/99	7.2; 14/20	11.3; 42/58	6.2; 10/17	2.3; 6/10	6.8; 13/27	1.3; 5/8	–	2.3; 1/4	1.5; 1/2	–	0.4; 2	–	9.3
Metra Seis/La Vanguardia	28 May–1 Jun 1977	1,700	83.1	34.4	24.2	9.7	4.9	6.8	–	3.1	–	–	–	–	–	–	–	10.2
Metra Seis/Diario 16	28 May–1 Jun 1977	1,700	76.8	40.5	20.7	7.8	8.3	6.1	3.1	5.6	1.4	–	–	3.5	–	–	–	19.8
Sofemasa/El País	18–19 May 1977	1,638	85.2	33.8	22.5	9.7	9.6	6.6	–	5.0	2.7	–	2.9	2.4	1.2	–	–	11.3
Sofemasa/El País	4–5 May 1977	1,595	85.1	33.5	21.9	8.8	7.9	9.0	–	1.8	2.5	–	0.5	1.4	0.4	–	–	11.6

==== Voting preferences ====
The table below lists raw, unweighted voting preferences.

Polling firm/Commissioner	Fieldwork date	Sample size	UCD	PSOE	PCE	AP	PSP	PDC	EDCEE	PNV	EC–FED	ASD	FDI	AN18	Question	☒	Lead
1977 general election	15 Jun 1977	—N/a	26.8	22.8	7.3	6.4	3.5	2.2	1.8	1.3	0.6	0.5	0.5	0.4	—N/a	21.2	4.0
ICSA–Gallup/Ya	14 Jun 1977	1,200	23.5	26.5	5.3	5.2	4.4	2.2	3.6	1.7	–	0.6	2.8	0.5	16.1	2.5	3.0
Sofemasa/El País	6–8 Jun 1977	15,875	27.7	22.0	6.6	7.5	4.4	1.2	2.1	0.8	0.6	0.8	–	0.6	15.0	3.6	5.7
CIS	1 Jun 1977	27,260	12.9	12.6	4.3	4.1	2.7	1.8	2.4	0.8	0.4	–	–	–	36.5	6.3	0.3
Sofemasa/El País	18–19 May 1977	1,638	20.1	13.4	5.8	5.7	3.9	–	3.0	1.6	–	1.7	–	0.7	34.9	5.6	6.7
Consulta/Cambio 16	10 May 1977	1,569	8.0	10.0	4.0	5.0	–	–	4.0	–	–	4.0	–	–	54.0	8.0	2.0
Sofemasa/El País	4–5 May 1977	1,595	19.0	12.4	5.0	4.5	5.1	–	1.0	1.4	–	0.3	–	0.2	38.8	4.5	6.6
Consulta/ABC	4 May 1977	1,506	14.0	14.0	4.0	6.0	–	–	4.0	–	–	4.0	2.0	1.0	43.0		Tie

==== Victory likelihood ====
The table below lists opinion polling on the perceived likelihood of victory for each party in the event of a general election taking place.

Polling firm/Commissioner	Fieldwork date	Sample size	UCD	PSOE	PCE	AP	FDI	AN18	Other/ None	Question	Lead
Consulta/ABC	4 May 1977	1,506	36.0	14.0	1.0	4.0	1.0	3.0	5.0	36.0	22.0

=== Sub-national polling ===
==== Basque Country ====
Polling firm/Commissioner	Fieldwork date	Sample size	Turnout	PNV	PSE	UCD	AP	EE	PCE/EPK	ESB	DCV	Lead
1977 general election	15 Jun 1977	—N/a	77.2	29.3; 8	26.5; 7	12.8; 4	7.1; 1	6.1; 1	4.5; 0	3.6; 0	2.6; 0	2.8
Sofemasa/El País	6–8 Jun 1977	?	?	? 6	? 8	? 2	? 1	? 1	? 1	? 2	–	?

==== Catalonia ====
Polling firm/Commissioner	Fieldwork date	Sample size	Turnout	SC	PSUC	UCD	PDC	UCiDCC	EC–FED	CC–AP	PSP	Lead
1977 general election	15 Jun 1977	—N/a	79.5	28.6; 15	18.3; 8	16.9; 9	16.9; 11	5.7; 2	4.7; 1	3.6; 1	1.4; 0	10.3
Tecnia/Informaciones	11–12 Jun 1977	?	?	25.6	12.7	14.3	14.8	–	3.7	–	–	10.8
Sofemasa/El País	6–8 Jun 1977	?	?	? 13	? 11	? 10	? 10	–	? 1	? 2	–	?
Tele eXprés	3 May 1977	?	?	20.0	10.0	25.0	35.0	–	–	10.0	–	10.0

== Leadership polling ==
=== Preferred prime minister ===
The table below lists opinion polling on leader preferences to become prime minister.

Polling firm/Commissioner	Fieldwork date	Sample size							Other/ None/ Not care	Question	Lead
Polling firm/Commissioner	Fieldwork date	Sample size	Suárez UCD	González PSOE	Carrillo PCE	Fraga AP	Arias AP	Tierno PSP	Other/ None/ Not care	Question	Lead
Metra Seis/Diario 16	28 May–1 Jun 1977	1,700	37.7	13.6	4.2	3.2	–	5.0	11.5	24.8	24.1
Sofemasa/El País	18–19 May 1977	1,638	37.0	19.0	7.0	7.0	–	9.0	21.0		18.0
Sofemasa/El País	4–5 May 1977	1,595	43.0	23.0	–	–	5.0	–	29.0		20.0
Consulta/ABC	4 May 1977	1,506	29.0	10.0	5.0	3.0	–	3.0	13.0	37.0	19.0
