= Democratic People's Federation =

Democratic People's Federation Federación Popular Democrática
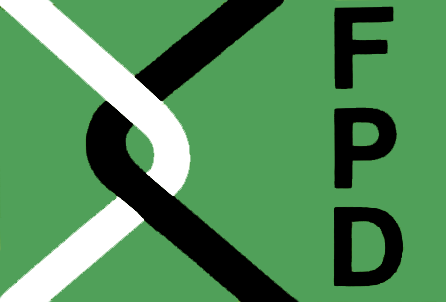
- Leader: José María Gil-Robles y Quiñones
- Founded: 1975
- Dissolved: 27 March 1977
- Ideology: Christian democracy
- Political position: Centre
- National affiliation: Federation of Christian Democracy

Democratic People's Federation (Spanish: Federación Popular Democrática, FPD) was a Christian Democratic political organization created in 1975 by José María Gil-Robles, heir of the Christian Social Democracy of José María Gil-Robles y Quiñones.

The federation was composed of the Democratic People's Federation, Basque Christian Democracy, Democratic Party of Andalusia, Castilla Democratic People's Party and the Western People's Association. It held its first and only Congress on 29 and 30 January 1977.

It formed, along with Democratic Left of Joaquín Ruiz-Giménez, the Federation of Christian Democracy on March 27, 1977, which was part of the Christian Democratic Team of the Spanish State. In the 1977 general elections, where it only obtained 1.18% of the votes, so soon after both were dissolved.

== Members ==
The Democratic People's Federation was composed of the following parties:

- Christian Democracy of Castile.
- Basque Christian Democracy.
- Murcian Christian Democracy.
- Western Christian Democracy.
- Aragonese Christian Democracy.
- Andalusian Democratic People's Party.
