= 1977 Spanish general election =

- 15 June 1977

All 350 seats in the Congress of Deputies and 207 (of 248) seats in the Senate 176 seats needed for a majority in the Congress of Deputies
- Opinion polls
- Registered: 23,583,762
- Turnout: 18,590,130 (78.8%)
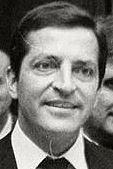

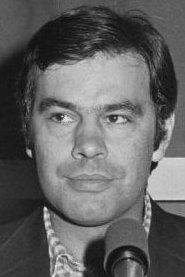

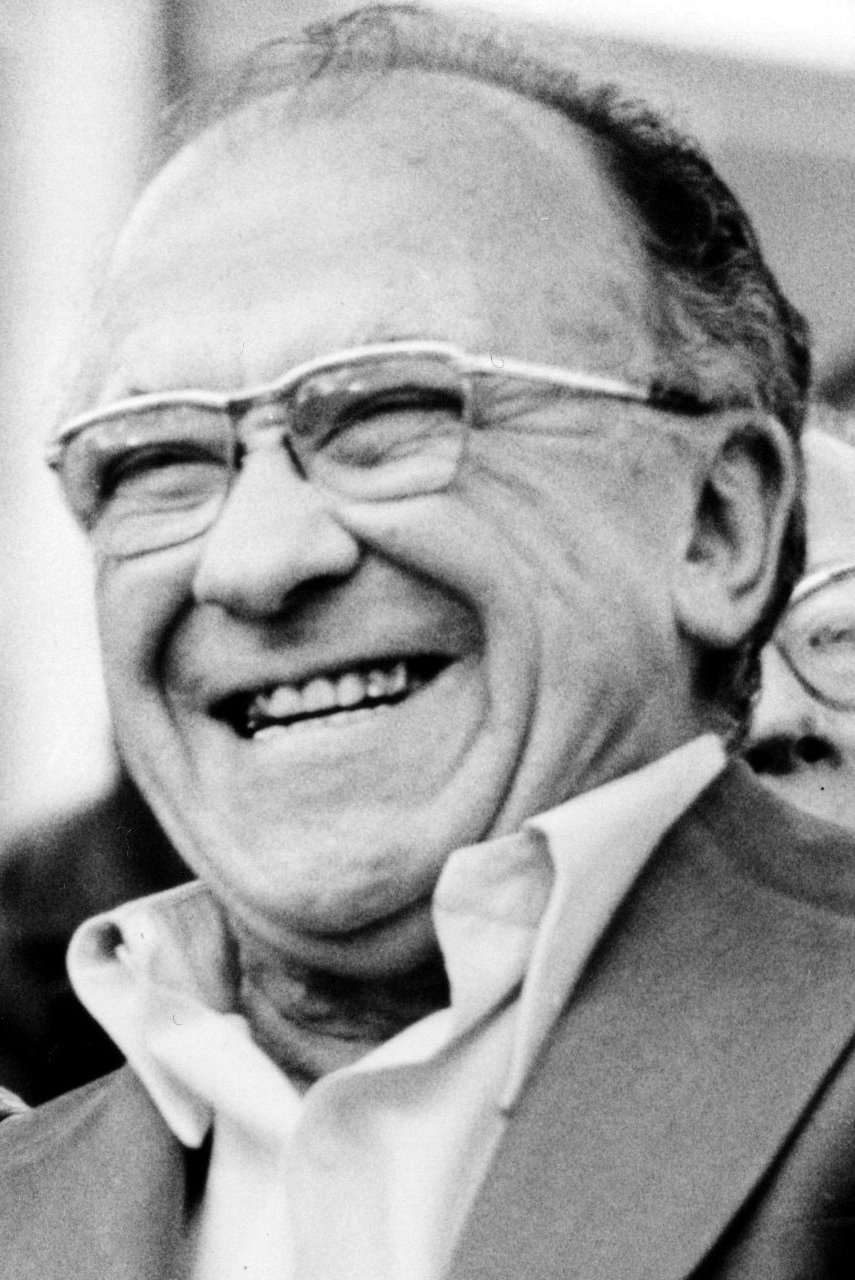

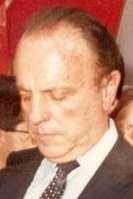

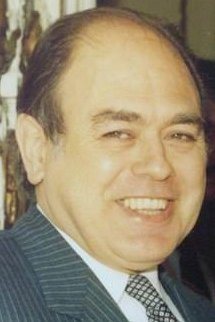

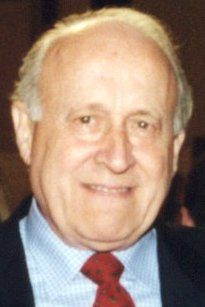
	First party	Second party	Third party
Leader	Adolfo Suárez	Felipe González	Santiago Carrillo
Party	UCD	PSOE	PCE
Leader since	3 May 1977	13 October 1974	3 July 1960
Leader's seat	Madrid	Madrid	Madrid
Seats won	165	118	20
Popular vote	6,310,391	5,371,866	1,709,890
Percentage	34.4%	29.3%	9.3%
	Fourth party	Fifth party	Sixth party
Leader	Manuel Fraga	Jordi Pujol	Xabier Arzalluz
Party	AP	PDC	EAJ/PNV
Leader since	9 October 1976	17 November 1974	1977
Leader's seat	Madrid	Barcelona	Guipúzcoa
Seats won	16	11	8
Popular vote	1,526,671	514,647	296,193
Percentage	8.3%	2.8%	1.6%
Prime Minister before election
Adolfo Suárez
UCD
Prime Minister after election
Adolfo Suárez
UCD

A general election was held in Spain on 15 June 1977 to elect the members of the Spanish Cortes. All 350 seats in the Congress of Deputies were up for election, as well as all 207 seats in the Senate.

It was the first free election held in Spain since 1936, prior to the outbreak of the Spanish Civil War. It was called by Prime Minister Adolfo Suárez as part of the political reform of the Francoist regime, ongoing since shortly after Francisco Franco's death in 1975 and promoted by his successor, King Juan Carlos I. Its aim was to elect a Constituent Cortes that was to draft a new constitution, which would ultimately lead to the repealing of the Fundamental Laws of the Realm and the culmination of the country's transition to democracy.

The Union of the Democratic Centre (UCD), the electoral alliance created to serve as Suárez's political platform in government, emerged as the largest political force overall, albeit 11 seats short of an absolute majority. The election surprise was the Spanish Socialist Workers' Party (PSOE) of Felipe González, which—supported by the German SPD and running a campaign intended to highlight González's youth and charisma—won 118 seats and became the main left-of-centre party by a wide margin. The Communist Party of Spain (PCE), which had been the main opposition force to the dictatorship, and the right-wing People's Alliance (AP) of former Francoist minister Manuel Fraga, performed below expectations. Turnout was high at 78.8%, the second highest for any nationwide election held ever since.

== Background ==
The death of Francisco Franco in 1975 paved the way for Spain's transition from an autocratic, one-party dictatorship into a democratic, constitutional monarchy. As per the 1947 Succession Law, the Spanish monarchy was restored under the figure of Juan Carlos I, who quickly became the promoter of a peaceful democratic reform of state institutions. This move was supported by western countries, an important sector of Spanish and international capitalism, a majority of the opposition to Francoism—organized into the Democratic Convergence Platform and the Democratic Junta, which in 1976 would both merge into the Democratic Coordination—and a growing part of the Franco regime itself, weary of popular mobilization after the outcome of the Carnation Revolution in neighbouring Portugal in 1974. However, the incumbent prime minister, Carlos Arias Navarro, rejected any major transformation of the Spanish political system and rather supported the preservation of Francoist laws, resulting in his dismissal by the King in July 1976, who appointed Adolfo Suárez for the post.

Suárez's plans for political reform involved the transformation of Spanish institutions in accordance to the Francoist legal system through the approval of a "political reform bill" as a Fundamental Law of the Realm. This was meant as a step beyond Arias Navarro's plans to update—but preserve—the Francoist regime, with Suárez intending to implement democracy "from law to law through law"—in the words of Torcuato Fernández-Miranda—without the outright liquidation of the Francoist system as called for by opposition parties. Thus, on 18 November 1976, the Political Reform Law was passed by the Francoist Cortes, later ratified in a referendum on 15 December with overwhelming popular support. As set out in Suárez's scheme, the Law called for an electoral process to elect new Cortes that were to be responsible for drafting a democratic constitution.

== Overview ==
Under the 1977 Political Reform Law, the Spanish Cortes were conceived as a provisional assembly tasked with drafting a new constitution to replace the Fundamental Laws of the Realm. The initiative for constitutional amendment belonged to the Congress of Deputies and the national government, and constitutional bills had to be passed by an absolute majority in both the Congress and the Senate. If the Senate rejected a bill approved by Congress, the disagreement was to be examined by a mixed commission and, if the deadlock continued, both chambers would meet in a joint sitting as a single legislative body to decide the issue by absolute majority.

=== Date ===
The term of the previous Spanish Cortes expired on 30 June 1977, after their term had been extended twice since their scheduled expiration date in November 1975.

The election to the Spanish Cortes was officially called on 15 April 1977 with the publication of the corresponding decree in the Official State Gazette (BOE), setting election day for 15 June. Both chambers were scheduled to reconvene on 13 July.

=== Electoral system ===
Voting for each chamber of the Spanish Cortes was based on universal suffrage, comprising all Spanish nationals over 21 years of age with full civil and political rights.

The Congress of Deputies had 350 seats in its first election. Of these, 348 were elected in 50 multi-member constituencies corresponding to the provinces of Spain—each of which was assigned an initial minimum of two seats and the remaining 248 distributed in proportion to population, roughly one seat per 144,500 inhabitants or fraction above 70,000—using the D'Hondt method and closed-list proportional voting, with a three percent-threshold of valid votes (including blank ballots) in each constituency. The remaining two seats were allocated to Ceuta and Melilla as single-member districts elected by plurality voting. The use of this electoral method resulted in a higher effective threshold depending on district magnitude and vote distribution.

As a result of the aforementioned allocation, each Congress multi-member constituency was entitled the following seats:

Seats	Constituencies
33	Barcelona
32	Madrid
15	Valencia
12	Seville
10	Biscay, Oviedo
9	Alicante, La Coruña
8	Cádiz, Málaga, Murcia, Pontevedra, Zaragoza
7	Badajoz, Córdoba, Granada, Guipúzcoa, Jaén, Santa Cruz de Tenerife
6	Balearics, Las Palmas, León
5	Almería, Cáceres, Castellón, Ciudad Real, Gerona, Huelva, Lugo, Navarre, Orense, Santander, Tarragona, Toledo, Valladolid
4	Álava, Albacete, Burgos, Cuenca, Lérida, Logroño, Salamanca, Zamora
3	Ávila, Guadalajara, Huesca, Palencia, Segovia, Soria, Teruel

207 Senate seats were elected using open-list (Note: Parties could group candidates into lists, although each candidate was treated separately for the purpose of the voting procedure.) partial block voting: voters in constituencies electing four seats could choose up to three candidates; in those with two or three seats, up to two; and in single-member districts, one. Each of the 47 peninsular provinces was allocated four seats, while in insular provinces—such as the Balearic and Canary Islands—the districts were the islands themselves, with the larger ones (Mallorca, Gran Canaria and Tenerife) being allocated three seats each, and the smaller ones (Menorca, Ibiza–Formentera, Fuerteventura, La Gomera–El Hierro, Lanzarote and La Palma) one each. Ceuta and Melilla elected two seats each. Additionally, the monarch could directly appoint a number of senators not higher than one-fifth of the elected seats.

The law provided for by-elections to fill vacant seats in the Congress only when results in a constituency were annulled by a final sentence following an electoral petition; otherwise, vacancies arising after the proclamation of candidates and during the legislative term were filled by the next candidates on the party lists or, when required, by designated substitutes. Additionally for the Senate, by-elections were required to fill any seat vacated within the first two years of the legislative term.

== Candidates ==
=== Nomination rules ===
Spanish citizens with the right to vote could run for election. Causes of ineligibility applied to the following officials:

- Holders of a number of senior public or institutional post, including government ministers (but not the prime minister); the heads of higher courts and state institutions; (Note: These comprised the Supreme Court, the Council of State, the Court of Auditors and the Council of National Economy.) high-ranking officials of government departments and other state agencies; civil governors-general and governors, as well as government delegates in the islands and the cities of Ceuta and Melilla; members of electoral commissions; and the chairs of national trade unions;
- Judges and public prosecutors in active service;
- Members of the Armed Forces and law enforcement bodies in active service, as well as senior police officials.

Other ineligibility provisions also applied to a number of territorial officials in these categories within their areas of jurisdiction.

Incompatibility rules included those of ineligibility (except for government ministers, high-ranking officials of government departments, and chairs of national trade unions), and also barred combining legislative roles (deputy and senator).

=== Parties and lists ===
The electoral law allowed for parties and federations registered in the interior ministry, alliances and groupings of electors to present lists of candidates. Parties and federations intending to form an alliance were required to inform the relevant electoral commission within 15 days of the election call, whereas groupings of electors needed to secure the signature of at least one permille—and, in any case, 500 signatures—of the electorate in the constituencies for which they sought election, disallowing electors from signing for more than one list.

Below is a list of the main parties and alliances which contested the election:

Candidacy	Parties and alliances	Leading candidate	Ideology	Gov.	Ref.
UCD	List: People's Party (PP); Christian Democratic Party (PDC); Federation of Democratic and Liberal Parties (FPDL); Social Democratic Party (PSD); People's Democratic Party (PDP); Social Democratic Federation (FSD); Liberal Party (PL); Independent Social Democratic Party (PSI); Liberal Progressive Party (PPL); Spanish Social Democratic Union (USDE); Andalusian Social Liberal Party (PSLA); Independent Galician Party (PGI); Extremaduran Regional Action (AREX); Canarian Union (UC); Murcian Democratic Union (UDM)	Adolfo Suárez	Centrism	Yes	
PSOE	List: Spanish Socialist Workers' Party (PSOE); Socialists of Catalonia (SC) – Socialist Party of Catalonia–Congress (PSC–C) – Catalan Socialist Federation (PSOE)	Felipe González	Social democracy Democratic socialism Marxism	No	
PCE	List: Communist Party of Spain (PCE); Unified Socialist Party of Catalonia (PSUC)	Santiago Carrillo	Eurocommunism	No	
AP	List: People's Alliance (AP); Spanish Democratic Action (ADE); Spanish National Union (UNE); Navarrese Foral Alliance (AFN); Action for Ceuta (APC); United Gipuzkoa (GU) – People's Alliance (AP) – Spanish Phalanx of the CNSO (FE–JONS); Catalan Coexistence (CC–AP) – People's Alliance (AP) – Catalan Union (UC) – Catalan Liberal Democratic Party (PDLC) – Democratic Union for Social Progress (UDPS) – Lleidan Union (ULL)	Manuel Fraga	Conservatism; National conservatism	No	
PSP–US	List: People's Socialist Party (PSP); Federation of Socialist Parties (FPS) – Socialist Party of Andalusia (PSA) – Socialist Party of Aragon (PSAr) – Autonomist Socialist Party of Canaries (PSAC) – Socialist Party of the Murcian Region (PSRM) – Socialist Party of the Islands (PSI) – Socialist Movement of Menorca (MSM) – Socialist Party of the Valencian Country (PSPV)	Enrique Tierno Galván	Democratic socialism Marxism; Federalism	No	
PDC	List: Democratic Convergence of Catalonia (CDC); Socialist Party of Catalonia–Regrouping (PSC–R); Democratic Left of Catalonia (EDC); National Front of Catalonia (FNC)	Jordi Pujol	Catalan nationalism Liberalism; Social liberalism	No	
EDCEE	List: Federation of Christian Democracy (FDC) – Democratic People's Federation (FPD) – Democratic Left (ID); Union of the Centre and Christian Democracy of Catalonia (UCiDCC) – Democratic Union of Catalonia (UDC) – Catalan Centre (CC); Democratic Union of the Valencian Country (UDPV); Galician People's Party (PPG); Basque Christian Democracy (DCV); Democratic Union of the Balearic Islands (UDIB)	Joaquín Ruiz-Giménez	Christian democracy Federalism	No	
EAJ/PNV	List: Basque Nationalist Party (EAJ/PNV)	Xabier Arzalluz	Basque nationalism Christian democracy	No	
EC–FED	List: Republican Left of Catalonia (ERC); Party of Labour of Catalonia (PTC); Catalan State (EC)	Heribert Barrera	Left-wing nationalism Socialism	No	
ASDCI	List: Spanish Socialist Workers' Party (historical) (PSOEh); Spanish Democratic Socialist Party (PSDE)	José Prat	Democratic socialism Social democracy	No	
FDI	List: Party of Labour of Spain (PTE); Independent Socialist Party (PSI); Independent Socialist Democratic Bloc (BDSI); Party of Communist Unification in the Canaries (PUCC); Communist Unification of Spain (UCE)	Lorenzo Benassar	Communism; Socialism	No	
AN18	List: New Force (FN); Spanish Phalanx of the CNSO (FE–JONS); Traditionalist Communion (CT)	Raimundo Fernández-Cuesta	Francoism; Neofascism; National catholicism	No	
EE	List: Basque Country Left (EE) – Party of the Basque Revolution (EIA) – Communist Movement of the Basque Country (EMK/MCE); Navarrese Left Union (UNAI) – Party of the Basque Revolution (EIA) – Communist Movement of the Basque Country (EMK/MCE) – Basque Socialists (ES) – Workers' Brotherhood of Catholic Action (HOAC) – Organization of Communist Left (OIC/EKE) – Workers' Revolutionary Organization (ORT)	Francisco Letamendia	Basque nationalism Socialism	No	
CAIC	List: Centre Independent Aragonese Candidacy (CAIC)	Hipólito Gómez de las Roces	Regionalism; Conservatism	No	
SD	List: Spanish Socialist Workers' Party (PSOE); Democratic Left (ID); Liberal Alliance (AL); Communist Party of Spain (PCE)	Mariano Aguilar Navarro	Pro-democracy; Big tent	No	
Entesa	List: Socialist Party of Catalonia–Congress (PSC–C); Catalan Socialist Federation (PSOE); Unified Socialist Party of Catalonia (PSUC); Left of Catalonia (EC–FED)	Josep Benet	Catalanism; Autonomism	No	
FA	List: Basque Nationalist Party (EAJ/PNV); Socialist Party of the Basque Country (PSE–PSOE); Socialists' Unification of the Basque Country (ESEI)	Juan María Vidarte	Basque autonomism Big tent	No	
DiC	List: Democratic Convergence of Catalonia (CDC); Socialist Party of Catalonia–Regrouping (PSC–R); Democratic Left of Catalonia (EDC); National Front of Catalonia (FNC); Democratic Union of Catalonia (UDC); Catalan Centre (CC)	Josep Pi-Sunyer	Catalan nationalism Autonomism	No	

== Campaign ==
=== Debates ===
1977 Spanish general election debates
Date	Organizer(s)	Moderator(s)	P Present (Note: Denotes a main invitee attending the event.) S Surrogate (Note: Denotes a main invitee not attending the event, sending a surrogate in their place.) NI Not invited I Invited A Absent invitee							
Date	Organizer(s)	Moderator(s)	UCD	PSOE	PCE	AP	PSP	EDCEE	Audience	Ref.
7 June	Club Convergencia	Carlos Ollero	S P. Llorca	S Solana	S S. Montero	S Hermosilla	S Morodo	S G. Robles	—	

== Results ==
=== Congress of Deputies ===
Summary of 15 June 1977 Congress of Deputies election results →
Parties and alliances	Popular vote			Seats	
Parties and alliances	Votes	%	±pp	Total	+/−
Union of the Democratic Centre (UCD)	6,310,391	34.44	n/a	165	n/a
Spanish Socialist Workers' Party (PSOE)	5,371,866	29.32	n/a	118	n/a
Communist Party of Spain (PCE)	1,709,890	9.33	n/a	20	n/a
People's Alliance (AP)	1,526,671	8.33	n/a	16	n/a
People's Alliance (AP)	1,504,771	8.21	n/a	16	n/a
Navarrese Foral Alliance (AFN)	21,900	0.12	n/a	0	n/a
People's Socialist Party–Socialist Unity (PSP–US)	828,461	4.52	n/a	6	n/a
People's Socialist Party–Socialist Unity (PSP–US)	816,582	4.46	n/a	6	n/a
Centre-Left of Albacete (CIA)	11,879	0.06	n/a	0	n/a
Democratic Pact for Catalonia (PDC)	514,647	2.81	n/a	11	n/a
Christian Democratic Team of the Spanish State (EDCEE)	417,678	2.28	n/a	2	n/a
Federation of Christian Democracy (FPD–ID)	215,841	1.18	n/a	0	n/a
Union of the Centre and Christian Democracy of Catalonia (UCiDCC)	172,791	0.94	n/a	2	n/a
Basque Christian Democracy (DCV)	26,100	0.14	n/a	0	n/a
Democratic Union of the Balearic Islands (UDIB)	2,946	0.02	n/a	0	n/a
Basque Nationalist Party (EAJ/PNV)	296,193	1.62	n/a	8	n/a
Left of Catalonia–Democratic Electoral Front (EC–FED)	143,954	0.79	n/a	1	n/a
Democratic Socialist Alliance (PSOEh–PSDE)	126,944	0.69	n/a	0	n/a
Democratic Socialist Alliance (ASDCI)	101,916	0.56	n/a	0	n/a
Spanish Socialist Workers' Party (historical) (PSOEh)	21,242	0.12	n/a	0	n/a
Spanish Democratic Socialist Party (PSDE)	3,786	0.02	n/a	0	n/a
Democratic Left Front (FDI)	122,608	0.67	n/a	0	n/a
National Alliance July 18 (AN18)	97,894	0.53	n/a	0	n/a
National Alliance July 18 (AN18)	67,336	0.37	n/a	0	n/a
Spanish Phalanx of the CNSO (FE–JONS)	25,017	0.14	n/a	0	n/a
New Force (FN)	5,541	0.03	n/a	0	n/a
Basque Country Left–Navarrese Left Union (EE–UNAI)	85,906	0.47	n/a	1	n/a
Basque Country Left (EE)	61,417	0.34	n/a	1	n/a
Navarrese Left Union (UNAI)	24,489	0.13	n/a	0	n/a
Workers' Electoral Group (AET)	77,575	0.42	n/a	0	n/a
Spanish Social Reform (RSE)	64,241	0.35	n/a	0	n/a
Spanish Phalanx of the CNSO (Authentic) (FE–JONS(A))	46,548	0.25	n/a	0	n/a
Front for Workers' Unity (FUT)	41,208	0.22	n/a	0	n/a
Centre Independent Aragonese Candidacy (CAIC)	37,183	0.20	n/a	1	n/a
Basque Socialist Party (ESB/PSV)	36,002	0.20	n/a	0	n/a
Communist Movement (MC)^{1}	34,588	0.19	n/a	0	n/a
Popular Unity for Socialism Candidacy (CUPS)	12,040	0.07	n/a	0	n/a
Regionalist Unity (UR)	10,821	0.06	n/a	0	n/a
Popular Unity Candidates (CUP)	5,206	0.03	n/a	0	n/a
Aragonese Autonomist Front (FAA)	4,791	0.03	n/a	0	n/a
Regionalist Left Unitary Candidacy (CUIR)	1,504	0.01	n/a	0	n/a
Left Andalusian Bloc (BAI)	226	0.00	n/a	0	n/a
Socialist Party of the Valencian Country (PSPV)	31,138	0.17	n/a	0	n/a
Centre Independent Candidacy (CIC)	29,834	0.16	n/a	1	n/a
Galician Socialist Party (PSG)	27,197	0.15	n/a	0	n/a
Galician National-Popular Bloc (BNPG)	22,771	0.12	n/a	0	n/a
Andalusian Regional Unity (URA)	21,350	0.12	n/a	0	n/a
League of Catalonia–Catalan Liberal Party (LC–PLC)	20,109	0.11	n/a	0	n/a
National Association for the Study of Current Problems (ANEPA–CP)	18,113	0.10	n/a	0	n/a
Navarrese Autonomist Union (PNV–ANV–ESB)	18,079	0.10	n/a	0	n/a
United Canarian People (PCU)	17,717	0.10	n/a	0	n/a
Basque Independent Democrats (DIV)	15,505	0.08	n/a	0	n/a
Balearic Autonomist Union (UAB)	11,914	0.07	n/a	0	n/a
Independent Navarrese Front (FNI)	10,606	0.06	n/a	0	n/a
Canarian People's Party (PPCan)	9,650	0.05	n/a	0	n/a
Social Christian Democracy of Catalonia (DSCC)	9,157	0.05	n/a	0	n/a
Socialist Movement (MS)	8,741	0.05	n/a	0	n/a
Montejurra–Federalism–Self-Management (MFA)	8,461	0.05	n/a	0	n/a
Agrarian Social Action (ASA)	8,439	0.05	n/a	0	n/a
José Antonio Circles (CJA)	8,184	0.04	n/a	0	n/a
Independent Candidacy (INDEP)	6,472	0.04	n/a	0	n/a
Basque Nationalist Action (EAE/ANV)	6,435	0.04	n/a	0	n/a
Congress Independent Candidacy for Girona (CICPG)	6,411	0.03	n/a	0	n/a
Independent (INDEP)	6,158	0.03	n/a	0	n/a
Aragonese Christian Democracy (DCAR)	6,014	0.03	n/a	0	n/a
Riojan Independent Candidacy (CIR)	5,682	0.03	n/a	0	n/a
Socialist Party of Canaries (PSCan)	5,110	0.03	n/a	0	n/a
Independent Party of Madrid (PIM)	4,814	0.03	n/a	0	n/a
Proverist Party (PPr)	4,590	0.03	n/a	0	n/a
Independent (INDEP)	4,530	0.02	n/a	0	n/a
United Canarian Left (ICU)	4,118	0.02	n/a	0	n/a
Galician Democratic Party (PDG)	3,196	0.02	n/a	0	n/a
Independent Candidacy (INDEP)	2,737	0.01	n/a	0	n/a
Labour Federation (FL)	2,631	0.01	n/a	0	n/a
Independent (INDEP)	2,622	0.01	n/a	0	n/a
Riojan Independent Group (GIR)	2,399	0.01	n/a	0	n/a
Independent (INDEP)	2,347	0.01	n/a	0	n/a
Valencia Socialist Radical Party (PRSV)	2,345	0.01	n/a	0	n/a
Carlist Electors of the Valencian Country (ECPV)	2,252	0.01	n/a	0	n/a
Independent Candidacy (INDEP)	1,684	0.01	n/a	0	n/a
City and Country Independent Electoral Group (AEICC)	1,623	0.01	n/a	0	n/a
Small Business Independent Candidates (CIPYE)	1,480	0.01	n/a	0	n/a
Association of Ceuta Electors (ADEC)	1,099	0.01	n/a	0	n/a
Group of Carlist Electors (ADC)	938	0.01	n/a	0	n/a
Independent Spanish Phalanx (FEI)	855	0.00	n/a	0	n/a
Spanish Agrarian Party (PAE)	833	0.00	n/a	0	n/a
Independent Liberal Party (PLI)	805	0.00	n/a	0	n/a
Independent (INDEP)	492	0.00	n/a	0	n/a
Left Andalusian Candidacy (CAI)	0	0.00	n/a	0	n/a
Blank ballots	46,248	0.25	n/a		
Total	18,324,333			350	n/a
Valid votes	18,324,333	98.57	n/a		
Invalid votes	265,797	1.43	n/a		
Votes cast / turnout	18,590,130	78.83	n/a		
Abstentions	4,993,632	21.17	n/a		
Registered voters	23,583,762				
Sources
Footnotes: ^{1} The Communist Movement did not contest the election under its label, but ran scattered across different candidacies instead.

Popular vote
UCD	34.44%
PSOE	29.32%
PCE	9.33%
AP	8.33%
PSP–US	4.52%
PDC	2.81%
EDCEE	2.28%
EAJ/PNV	1.62%
EC–FED	0.79%
EE–UNAI	0.47%
CAIC	0.20%
CIC	0.16%
Others	5.48%
Blank ballots	0.25%

Seats
UCD	47.14%
PSOE	33.71%
PCE	5.71%
AP	4.57%
PDC	3.14%
EAJ/PNV	2.29%
PSP–US	1.71%
EDCEE	0.57%
EC–FED	0.29%
EE–UNAI	0.29%
CAIC	0.29%
CIC	0.29%

=== Senate ===
Summary of the 15 June 1977 Senate of Spain election results →
Parties and alliances	Popular vote			Seats	
Parties and alliances	Votes	%	±pp	Total	+/−
Union of the Democratic Centre (UCD)	15,472,170	29.88	n/a	106	n/a
Spanish Socialist Workers' Party (PSOE)	5,714,036	11.04	n/a	35	n/a
Democratic Senate (SD)	5,444,924	10.52	n/a	16	n/a
Senators for Democracy (SpD)	2,819,791	5.45	n/a	3	n/a
Democratic Senate (SD)	1,716,936	3.32	n/a	9	n/a
Group of Electors for a Democratic Senate (AESD)	441,638	0.85	n/a	1	n/a
Independents for a Democratic Senate (ISD)	339,396	0.66	n/a	2	n/a
Democratic Union for the Senate (UDS)	127,163	0.25	n/a	1	n/a
People's Alliance (AP)	4,749,232	9.17	n/a	2	n/a
People's Alliance (AP)	4,688,480	9.05	n/a	2	n/a
Navarrese Foral Alliance (AFN)	60,752	0.12	n/a	0	n/a
Agreement of the Catalans (Entesa)	4,701,586	9.08	n/a	12	n/a
People's Socialist Party–Socialist Unity (PSP–US)	2,616,458	5.05	n/a	2	n/a
Autonomous Front (FA)	1,711,591	3.31	n/a	10	n/a
Independent Progressives and Socialists (PSI)	1,594,509	3.08	n/a	8	n/a
Independent Progressives and Socialists (PSI)	1,059,831	2.05	n/a	5	n/a
Democratic Forces for Santander (FDS)	231,382	0.45	n/a	1	n/a
Independent Democratic Group of Almeria Electors (AEDIA)	170,338	0.33	n/a	1	n/a
Democratic Riojan Association (ARD)	132,958	0.26	n/a	1	n/a
Democracy and Catalonia (DiC)	1,322,341	2.55	n/a	2	n/a
Communist Party of Spain (PCE)	1,014,272	1.96	n/a	0	n/a
Christian Democratic Team of the Spanish State (EDCEE)	811,519	1.57	n/a	0	n/a
Federation of Christian Democracy (FPD–ID)	649,293	1.25	n/a	0	n/a
Basque Christian Democracy (DCV)	147,880	0.29	n/a	0	n/a
Democratic Union of the Balearic Islands (UDIB)	14,346	0.03	n/a	0	n/a
Democratic Socialist Alliance (PSOEh–PSDE)	609,633	1.18	n/a	0	n/a
Democratic Socialist Alliance (ASDCI)	456,291	0.88	n/a	0	n/a
Spanish Socialist Workers' Party (historical) (PSOEh)	127,887	0.25	n/a	0	n/a
Spanish Democratic Socialist Party (PSDE)	25,455	0.05	n/a	0	n/a
Galician Democratic Candidacy (CDG)	602,260	1.16	n/a	3	n/a
Xirinacs Electoral Group (AE Xirinacs)	550,678	1.06	n/a	1	n/a
Aragonese Candidacy of Democratic Unity (CAUD)	538,538	1.04	n/a	3	n/a
National Alliance July 18 (AN18)	486,786	0.94	n/a	0	n/a
National Alliance July 18 (AN18)	425,085	0.82	n/a	0	n/a
Spanish Phalanx of the CNSO (FE–JONS)	47,465	0.09	n/a	0	n/a
New Force (FN)	14,236	0.03	n/a	0	n/a
Independent (INDEP)	355,479	0.69	n/a	0	n/a
Centre Independent Aragonese Candidacy (CAIC)	311,429	0.60	n/a	1	n/a
Spanish Social Reform (RSE)	254,805	0.49	n/a	0	n/a
Basque Country Left–Navarrese Left Union (EE–UNAI)	225,324	0.44	n/a	1	n/a
Basque Country Left (EE)	124,204	0.24	n/a	1	n/a
Navarrese Left Union (UNAI)	101,120	0.20	n/a	0	n/a
Workers' Electoral Group (AET)	215,968	0.42	n/a	0	n/a
Socialist Party of the Valencian Country (PSPV)	189,440	0.37	n/a	0	n/a
Galician National-Popular Bloc (BNPG)	167,385	0.32	n/a	0	n/a
Democratic Left Front (FDI)	129,855	0.25	n/a	0	n/a
Aragonese Christian Democracy (DCAR)	125,353	0.24	n/a	0	n/a
League of Catalonia–Catalan Liberal Party (LC–PLC)	118,454	0.23	n/a	0	n/a
Socialist Movement (MS)	103,373	0.20	n/a	0	n/a
Democratic Group of Albacete (ADA)	78,510	0.15	n/a	0	n/a
Andalusian Regional Unity (URA)	77,593	0.15	n/a	0	n/a
Independents of Soria (IDS)	75,080	0.15	n/a	4	n/a
Centre Independent Candidacy (CIC)	74,202	0.14	n/a	0	n/a
José Antonio Circles (CJA)	69,625	0.13	n/a	0	n/a
National Association for the Study of Current Problems (ANEPA–CP)	69,578	0.13	n/a	0	n/a
Liberal Alliance (AL)	68,463	0.13	n/a	0	n/a
Basque Socialist Party (ESB/PSV)	66,757	0.13	n/a	0	n/a
Independent Party of Madrid (PIM)	64,546	0.12	n/a	0	n/a
Independent Navarrese Front (FNI)	51,296	0.10	n/a	0	n/a
Regionalist Unity (UR)	50,698	0.10	n/a	0	n/a
Independent (INDEP)	50,275	0.10	n/a	0	n/a
Independents (INDEP)	47,206	0.09	n/a	0	n/a
Spanish Ecologist Party (PEE)	41,901	0.08	n/a	0	n/a
Independent (INDEP)	41,731	0.08	n/a	0	n/a
Montejurra–Federalism–Self-Management (MFA)	36,219	0.07	n/a	0	n/a
Independents (INDEP)	32,919	0.06	n/a	0	n/a
Navarre People's Group (APN)	32,861	0.06	n/a	0	n/a
Basque Nationalist Action (EAE/ANV)	31,534	0.06	n/a	0	n/a
Independents (INDEP)	30,119	0.06	n/a	0	n/a
Galician Democratic Party (PDG)	28,073	0.05	n/a	0	n/a
Labour Federation (FL)	26,680	0.05	n/a	0	n/a
Independent (INDEP)	26,516	0.05	n/a	0	n/a
Independent (INDEP)	24,935	0.05	n/a	0	n/a
Canarian Independent Democracy (DIC)	24,864	0.05	n/a	0	n/a
Basque Independent Democrats (DIV)	23,735	0.05	n/a	0	n/a
Independent (INDEP)	23,509	0.05	n/a	0	n/a
Traditionalist Communion (CT)	21,641	0.04	n/a	0	n/a
Lleidan Union (UL)	21,199	0.04	n/a	0	n/a
Group of Electors (AE)	21,042	0.04	n/a	0	n/a
Canarian People's Party (PPCan)	21,022	0.04	n/a	0	n/a
Independent (INDEP)	21,009	0.04	n/a	0	n/a
Independents (INDEP)	19,701	0.04	n/a	0	n/a
Independent (INDEP)	18,966	0.04	n/a	0	n/a
Regionalist Socialist Party (PSR)	18,812	0.04	n/a	0	n/a
United Canarian People (PCU)	18,427	0.04	n/a	0	n/a
Social Democratic Andalusian Party (PASD)	17,500	0.03	n/a	0	n/a
Riojan Independent Candidacy (CIR)	16,540	0.03	n/a	0	n/a
Independent (INDEP)	16,130	0.03	n/a	0	n/a
Balearic Autonomist Union (UAB)	14,402	0.03	n/a	0	n/a
Independent Electoral Group of Countryside and Town (AEICYU)	13,973	0.03	n/a	0	n/a
Independents (INDEP)	12,343	0.02	n/a	0	n/a
Independent (INDEP)	11,815	0.02	n/a	0	n/a
Group of Electors (AE)	10,696	0.02	n/a	0	n/a
Independent (INDEP)	9,141	0.02	n/a	0	n/a
Independent Democratic Candidacy (CDI)	9,104	0.02	n/a	0	n/a
Independent Liberal Party (PLI)	8,425	0.02	n/a	0	n/a
Independent (INDEP)	8,152	0.02	n/a	0	n/a
Spanish Agrarian Party (PAE)	7,879	0.02	n/a	0	n/a
Confederation of Conservative Parties (CPC)	7,093	0.01	n/a	0	n/a
Autonomist Bloc (BA)	6,540	0.01	n/a	0	n/a
Independents (INDEP)	5,742	0.01	n/a	0	n/a
Independent (INDEP)	4,530	0.01	n/a	0	n/a
Majorera Assembly (AM)	3,182	0.01	n/a	1	n/a
Spanish Phalanx of the CNSO (Authentic) (FE–JONS(A))	2,473	0.00	n/a	0	n/a
Autonomous Movement (MAP)	1,880	0.00	n/a	0	n/a
Independent (INDEP)	1,725	0.00	n/a	0	n/a
Menorca Island and Regional Problems (MPIA)	1,354	0.00	n/a	0	n/a
Blank ballots (Note: The percentage of blank ballots is calculated over the official number of valid votes cast, irrespective of the total number of votes shown as a result of adding up the individual results for each party.)			n/a		
Total	51,779,261			207	n/a
Valid votes			n/a		
Invalid votes			n/a		
Votes cast / turnout			n/a		
Abstentions			n/a		
Registered voters	23,583,762				

Popular vote
UCD	29.88%
PSOE	11.04%
SD	10.52%
AP	9.17%
Entesa	9.08%
PSP–US	5.05%
FA	3.31%
PSI	3.08%
DiC	2.55%
PCE	1.96%
EDCEE	1.57%
ASDCI	1.18%
CDG	1.16%
AE Xirinacs	1.06%
CAUD	1.04%
CAIC	0.60%
EE–UNAI	0.44%
IDS	0.15%
AM	0.01%
Others	7.17%
Blank ballots	0.00%

Seats
UCD	51.21%
PSOE	16.91%
SD	7.73%
Entesa	5.80%
FA	4.83%
PSI	3.86%
IDS	1.93%
CDG	1.45%
CAUD	1.45%
AP	0.97%
PSP–US	0.97%
DiC	0.97%
AE Xirinacs	0.48%
CAIC	0.48%
EE–UNAI	0.48%
AM	0.48%

=== Maps ===
Election results by constituency (Congress).

Vote winner strength by constituency (Congress).

Vote winner strength by autonomous community (Congress). (Note: This territorial division is based on the autonomic system established under the Spanish Constitution of 1978, as opposed to the regional division established in 1833. Most autonomous communities would be constituted by the time of the 1982 election, with the rest being established in early 1983. The autonomous cities of Ceuta and Melilla would not be constituted as independent administrative entities until 1995.)

== Bibliography ==
Legislation

- Decreto 1823/1975, de 31 de julio, por el que se prorroga la actual Legislatura de las Cortes Españolas (Decree 1823/1975). Official State Gazette (in Spanish). 31 July 1975. BOE-A-1975-16299.
- Decreto 111/1976, de 27 de enero, por el que se prorroga la actual Legislatura de las Cortes Españolas (Decree 111/1976). Official State Gazette (in Spanish). 27 January 1976. BOE-A-1976-1937.
- Ley 1/1977, de 4 de enero, para la Reforma Política (Fundamental Law 1/1977). Official State Gazette (in Spanish). 4 January 1977. BOE-A-1977-165.
- Real Decreto-ley 20/1977, de 18 de marzo, sobre Normas Electorales (Royal Decree-Law 20/1977). Official State Gazette (in Spanish). 18 March 1977. BOE-A-1977-7445.
- Real Decreto 679/1977, de 15 de abril, por el que se convocan elecciones generales a las Cortes Españolas (Royal Decree 679/1977). Official State Gazette (in Spanish). 15 April 1977. BOE-A-1977-9545.
- Real Decreto 1603/1977, de 5 de julio, por el que se convocan las Cortes de la Monarquía Española (Royal Decree 1603/1977). Official State Gazette (in Spanish). 5 July 1977. BOE-A-1977-15339.

Other

- Carreras de Odriozola, Albert; Tafunell Sambola, Xavier (2005) [1989]. Estadísticas históricas de España, siglos XIX-XX (PDF) (in Spanish). Vol. 1 (II ed.). Bilbao: Fundación BBVA. pp. 1072–1097. ISBN 84-96515-00-1. Archived from the original (PDF) on 24 September 2015.
- Juliá Díaz, Santos (1999). Un siglo de España. Política y sociedad (in Spanish). Madrid: Marcial Pons. ISBN 84-9537903-1.
- Martínez Martín, Jesús (1998). Historia de España. Siglo XX (1939-1996) (in Spanish). Madrid: Cátedra. ISBN 9788437617039.
- Preston, Paul (2003). Juan Carlos, el rey de un pueblo (in Spanish). Vol. 2. Hospitalet: ABC, S.L. pp. 362–415. ISBN 84-413-2063-2.
- Ruiz González, David (2002). La España democrática (1975-2000). Política y sociedad (in Spanish). Madrid: Síntesis. pp. 1072–1097. ISBN 84-9756-015-9.
- Tusell Gómez, Javier (1997). La transición española. La recuperación de las libertades (in Spanish). Madrid: Historia 16-Temas de Hoy. ISBN 84-7679-327-8.
