= League of Catalonia–Catalan Liberal Party =

League of Catalonia–Catalan Liberal Party Lliga de Catalunya–Partit Liberal Català
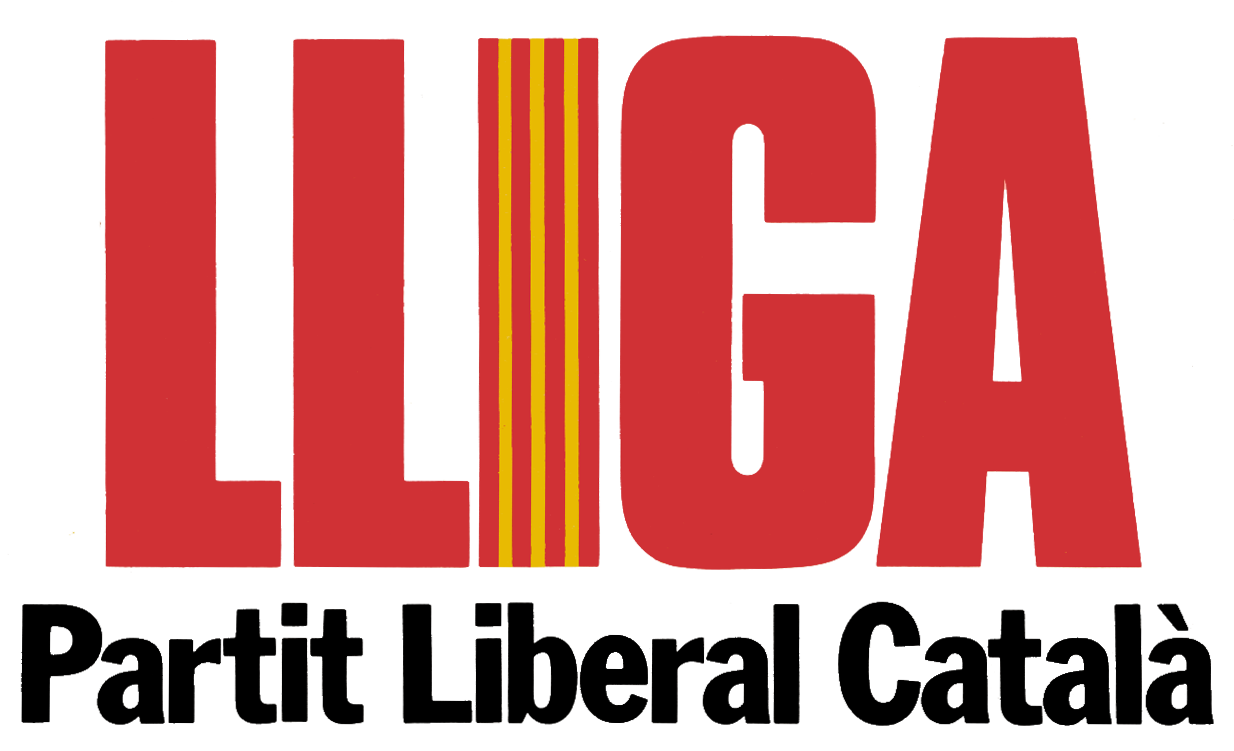
- Leader: Josep María Figueras
- Founded: 30 September 1976
- Dissolved: 1977
- Ideology: Liberalism; Catalanism
- Political position: Centre
- National affiliation: Federation of Democratic and Liberal Parties
- International affiliation: Liberal International

The League of Catalonia–Catalan Liberal Party (Catalan: Lliga de Catalunya–Partit Liberal Català, LC–PLC) was a Catalonia-based party alliance established on 30 September 1976 by the Catalan Liberal League (LLC) and Democratic Action (AD) ahead of the 1977 Spanish general election. It aimed at constitutiting itself as the successor to the historical Regionalist League of Catalonia, and after its establishment the alliance adhered to the Federation of Democratic and Liberal Parties of Joaquín Garrigues Walker and, through it, to the Liberal International.

== Electoral performance ==
=== Cortes Generales ===
==== Nationwide ====
Cortes Generales
Election	Congress					Senate		Leading candidate	Status in legislature
Election	Votes	%	#	Seats	+/–	Seats	+/–	Leading candidate	Status in legislature
1977	20,109	0.11%	26th	0 / 350	—	0 / 207	—	Josep María Figueras	No seats

==== Regional breakdown ====
Election	Catalonia						
Election	Congress					Senate	
Election	Votes	%	#	Seats	+/–	Seats	+/–
1977	20,109	0.66%	9th	0 / 47	—	0 / 16	—
