= Federation of Christian Democracy =

Defunct political organisation in Spain 1977-1978

Federation of Christian Democracy Federación de la Democracia Cristiana
- Founded: 14 April 1977
- Dissolved: 1978
- Merger of: Democratic People's Federation; Democratic Left
- Ideology: Christian democracy Federalism
- Political position: Center
- National affiliation: Christian Democratic Team of the Spanish State

Federation of Christian Democracy (Spanish: Federación de la Democracia Cristiana, FDC) was a Spanish political organization formed on April 14, 1977 by Democratic Left of Joaquín Ruiz-Giménez and Democratic People's Federation of José María Gil-Robles y Quiñones.

It was led by Manuel Hidalgo, Juan Bermúdez de Castro, Francisco Soroeta and Cristóbal García. It formed a coalition with the Democratic Union of the Valencian Country called Christian Democratic Team of the Spanish State (EDCEE) for the general elections of 1977. After the election failure (215,000 votes and a little more than 1% of the vote), on September 24, 1977 Democratic Left withdrew from the federation, and it merged with other political groups within the Christian Democracy in a founding congress on 4 and 5 February 1978.

== Members ==
At the time of the 1977 elections, the Federation of Christian Democracy was composed of:

- Democratic People's Federation
  - Christian Democracy of Castile
  - Basque Christian Democracy
  - Murcian Christian Democracy
  - Western Christian Democracy
  - Aragonese Christian Democracy
  - Andalusian Democratic People's Party
- Democratic Left
