= Centre-Left of Albacete =

Centre-Left of Albacete Centro Izquierda de Albacete
- Founded: 1977
- Dissolved: 1977
- Political position: Big tent

Centre-Left of Albacete (Spanish: Centro Izquierda de Albacete, CIA) was an electoral alliance formed in the province of Albacete by the People's Socialist Party, the Albacete Democratic Alliance and the Christian Democratic Team of the Spanish State to contest the 1977 general election.

== Member parties ==
- People's Socialist Party (PSP)
- Albacete Democratic Alliance (ADA)
- Christian Democratic Team of the Spanish State (ECDEE)
