= Left of Catalonia–Democratic Electoral Front =

Left of Catalonia–Electoral Democratic Front Esquerra de Catalunya–Front Electoral Democràtic
- Founded: 1977
- Dissolved: 23 June 1977
- Ideology: Catalanism; Socialism; Anti-fascism; Federalism; Republicanism
- Political position: Left-wing
- Supported by: Republican Left of Catalonia; Party of Labour of Catalonia; Estat Català; CSUT; Catalan Association of Women

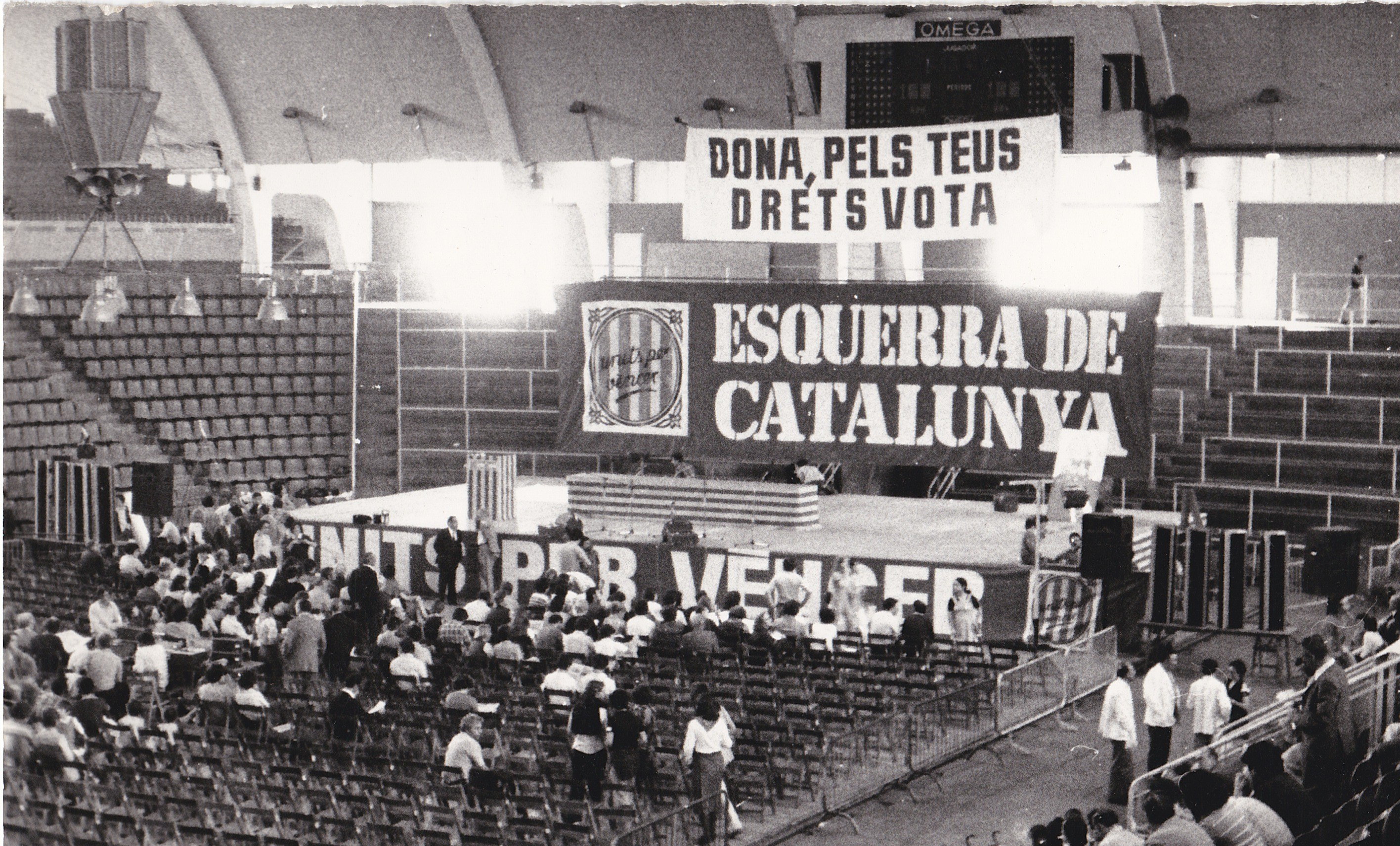
Public act of EC-FED.

Left of Catalonia–Electoral Democratic Front (Catalan: Esquerra de Catalunya–Front Electoral Democràtic, EC–FED), often shortened as just Left of Catalonia (Catalan: Esquerra de Catalunya), was a left-wing political platform in Catalonia, formed by Republican Left of Catalonia (ERC), the Party of Labour of Catalonia (PTC) and Catalan State (EC) to contest the 1977 Spanish general election. The alliance was formed to allow the three parties to run for election, as they had not been yet legalized at the time. The alliance ran lists in all four Catalan constituencies for the Congress of Deputies, whereas for the Spanish Senate it supported the Agreement of the Catalans coalition. Its referent at the Spanish level was the Democratic Left Front (FDI).

EC–FED obtained the 143,954 votes (4.72% of the total) and 1 seat for Barcelona, and was dissolved shortly after the election.

== Composition ==
Party
Republican Left of Catalonia (ERC)
Party of Labour of Catalonia (PTC)
Catalan State (EC)

== Electoral performance ==
=== Congress of Deputies ===
Congress of Deputies
Election	Catalonia				
Election	Votes	%	#	Seats	+/–
1977	143,954	4.72%	6th	1 / 47	—
