= National Alliance July 18 =

Spanish electoral coalition

National Alliance July 18 Alianza Nacional 18 de Julio
- Spokesperson: Blas Piñar
- Ideology: Francoism; Neo-fascism; National Catholicism; Spanish nationalism Social conservatism
- Political position: Far-right

Election poster

National Alliance July 18 (Spanish: Alianza Nacional 18 de Julio, AN18) was a far-right nationalist electoral coalition in Spain, formed ahead of the 1977 elections by New Force of Blas Piñar, Círculos Doctrinales José Antonio and Carlist Traditionalist Communion. July 18 refers to the day on which the Nationalist forces under the leadership of Francisco Franco launched a military uprising in 1936.

== History ==
Despite the attempt to gather all parties of the far-right, the "National Alliance" did not manage to integrate into its ranks all political forces of similar sign, as the Traditionalist Communion or the Spanish Falange of the JONS didn't join the coalition, The alliance gained 86,390 votes and no seats. This failure led the main party (Fuerza Nueva) to create a new (and more successful) coalition for the general elections of 1979; National Union.

== Elections results ==
=== Congress of Deputies / Senate ===
Election	Congress of Deputies					Senate		Rank	Government	Leader
Election	Votes	%	±pp	Seats won	+/−	Seats won	+/−	Rank	Government	Leader
1977	97,894	0.53%	▲	0 / 350	±0	—N/a	—N/a	#12	No seats	
