= Navarrese Foral Alliance =

Navarrese Foral Alliance Alianza Foral Navarra
- Abbreviation: AFN
- President: Amadeo Marco Ilincheta
- Founded: 7 March 1977
- Ideology: Conservatism; Spanish nationalism Navarrese regionalism Traditionalism; Political Catholicism
- Political position: Right-wing to far-right

Navarrese Foral Alliance (in Spanish: Alianza Foral Navarra) was a right-wing political party in Navarre, Spain. AFN was registered on March 7, 1977.

== History ==
In the 1977 elections AFN formed a coalition with People's Alliance and gained 21,900 votes in Navarra (8.49%), failing to win any seat. AFN called for a 'No'-vote on the Spanish Constitution, as they considered the proposed Constitution to be atheist and Marxist.

In the 1979 elections no candidates; some of its members were integrated into the newly founded Unión del Pueblo Navarro.

After its dissolution, many party members joined the Navarrese People's Union (UPN).
