= Galician Democratic Party =

Galician Democratic Party Partido Demócrata Gallego
- Leader: Ramón Pais Ferrín and José María García Marcos
- Founded: 1976
- Dissolved: January 5, 1978
- Ideology: Liberal conservatism Liberalism; Spanish nationalism Regionalism
- Political position: Right wing
- National affiliation: Federation of Democratic and Liberal Parties; UCD

Galician Democratic Party (Spanish: Partido Demócrata Gallego; PDG) was a Galician liberal political party, founded in 1976. The main leaders of the PDG were Ramón Pais Ferrín and José María García Marcos. The PDG was part of the Federation of Democratic and Liberal Parties (FPDL), led by Joaquín Garrigues Walker.

== History ==
Unlike the rest of the FPDL, the PDG didn't join the UCD, and presented an independent candidacy (only for the electoral district of A Coruña) in the general elections of 1977, gaining only 3,196 votes (0.71% of the vote in A Coruña province).

The party lost popular support in 1977 because of its lack of support for the autonomy of Galiza, despite its original regionalism, and its rejection of the constitutional process. The party finally decided to join the UCD in 1978.
