= Christian Democratic Team of the Spanish State =

Christian Democratic Team of the Spanish State Equipo Demócrata Cristiano del Estado Español
- Founded: 1973
- Dissolved: 1977
- Merger of: Federation of Christian Democracy; Democratic Union of the Valencian Country; Union of the Centre and Christian Democracy of Catalonia; Galician People's Party; Basque Christian Democracy
- Ideology: Christian democracy Federalism
- Political position: Centre
- International affiliation: Centrist Democrat International

Christian Democratic Team of the Spanish State (in Spanish: Equipo Demócrata Cristiano del Estado Español, EDCEE) was a political alliance of the Democratic Union of Catalonia, the Federation of Christian Democracy (composed of Democratic Left of Ruiz Giménez and the Democratic People's Federation of Gil Robles, formed in January 1976) and other regional parties. EDCEE contested the 1977 general elections in Spain in alliance with Catalan centrist forces. The alliance got 215,841 votes (1.18% of the nationwide vote).

== History ==
The team was formed in Taormina (Italy) during the XVII European Congress of Christian Democratic Parties, between 9 and 12 December 1965. The creation of the team was a requirement of the body which brought together the European Christian Democratic parties, which only contemplated a member per country. The initial members of the team were Democratic Left (ID), Basque Nationalist Party (PNV) and Democratic Union of Catalonia (UDC).

Shortly after the Social Christian Democracy joined, led by José María Gil-Robles, without the reticence of the Basque and Catalan nationalists.

At first the team did not act as such. Only in March 1973 they took place the First Conference of the Christian Democratic Team of the Spanish State (EDCEE) at the Abbey of Montserrat, where a federalist program was defined. Soon after, the Democratic Union of the Valencian Country (UDPV) joined the team, while Social Christian Democracy was transformed in the Democratic People's Federation (FPD) in 1975.

In any case, the team doesn't developed a unified political action, with each of the parties, especially the Basque and Catalan nationalists, acting for free. In 1976 the Galician People's Party (PPG) was created, including militants of the Galician Democratic Left, which participated in the activities of the team but not integrated into it. In 1977, Democratic Left and the Democratic People's Federation joined creating the Federation of Christian Democracy (FDC).

In the general elections of 1977, the candidacy of the Christian Democratic Team of the Spanish State was a coalition between the FPD and ID, including UDPV in the current Valencian Community but without the Galician People's Party although supporting him, and it doesn't presented candidates in Catalonia, where it supported the Union of the Center and Christian Democracy of Catalonia, a coalition that included UDC, or the Basque Country, where it supported Basque Christian Democracy. The results were very bad (215,841 votes, 1.18%) without getting the team any seats in Congress, and it was dissolved and its members defected to the Union of the Democratic Centre or People's Alliance.

== Members ==
At the time of the 1977 election, the Christian Democratic Team of the Spanish State was comprised

- Federation of Christian Democracy
  - Democratic People's Federation
    - Christian Democracy of Castile
    - Basque Christian Democracy
    - Murcian Christian Democracy
    - Western Christian Democracy
    - Aragonese Christian Democracy
    - Andalusian Democratic People's Party
  - Democratic Left
- Union of the Centre and Christian Democracy of Catalonia
  - Democratic Union of Catalonia
  - Catalan Centre
- Democratic Union of the Valencian Country
- Galician People's Party
- Navarrese People's Rally
