= Democratic Left (Spain) =

Defunct Spanish political party

Democratic Left Izquierda Democrática
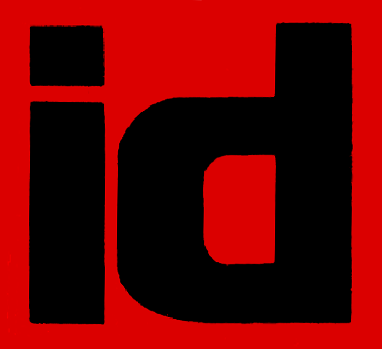
- Leader: Joaquín Ruíz-Giménez
- Founded: 1976
- Dissolved: 14 January 1979
- Youth wing: Democratic Left Youth
- Ideology: Christian democracy Social democracy Christian left
- Political position: Centre-left
- National affiliation: Christian Democratic Team of the Spanish State
- Colors: Red

The Democratic Left (Spanish: Izquierda Democrática, ID) was a Christian left political party in Spain. It was formed by people from the anti-Francoist opposition, like Gregorio Peces-Barba or Joaquín Ruíz-Giménez. The party had two main internal factions: the social democratic one and the Christian democratic one.

== History ==
ID was officially constituted in April 1976 at El Escorial, under the leadership of Joaquín Ruiz-Giménez and José Maria Gil-Robles. Internal differences led to a split, mainly of the more moderate sector led by Fernando Álvarez de Miranda, shortly after the party was founded. The splitters founded Christian Democratic Left, that would later join the Union of the Democratic Centre.

For the 1977 general election, the party was a member of the Federation of Christian Democracy, which was also included into the Christian Democratic Team of the Spanish State.

After the disappointing results in the Spanish general elections of 1977. ID didn't enter the Congress, its main objective, ID got 5 senators. ID dissolved in 1979 and its members joined other parties, mainly the PSOE and UCD.

== Democratic Left Youth ==

Democratic Left Youth (in Spanish: Juventudes de Izquierda Democrática) was the youth wing of the ID. JID existed at the time of the transition to democracy in 1977.
