= Centre Independent Aragonese Candidacy =

Defunct regionalist party in Aragon, Spain

Centre Independent Aragonese Candidacy Candidatura Aragonesa Independiente de Centro
- Leader: Hipólito Gómez de las Roces
- Founded: 1977
- Dissolved: 1978
- Split from: Union of the Democratic Centre
- Succeeded by: Regionalist Aragonese Party
- Ideology: Regionalism; Conservatism

The Centre Independent Aragonese Candidacy (Spanish: Candidatura Aragonesa Independiente de Centro, CAIC) was a regionalist political party in Spain, based in Aragon. It was founded in 1977 by dissidents from the Union of the Democratic Centre
