= Federation of Democratic and Liberal Parties =

Defunct Spanish political party (1976–1978)

Federation of Democratic and Liberal Parties Federación de Partidos Demócratas y Liberales
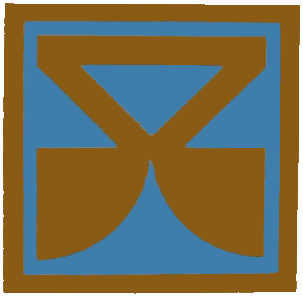
- Leader: Joaquín Garrigues Walker
- Founded: 1976
- Dissolved: 5 January 1978
- Merged into: UCD
- Ideology: Liberalism
- Political position: Centre-right
- National affiliation: UCD

Federation of Democratic and Liberal Parties (Spanish: Federación de Partidos Demócratas y Liberales; FPDL) was a Spanish liberal political party (with a federal structure), founded in 1976. The main leader of the FPDL was Joaquín Garrigues Walker.

== History ==
The June 15, 1976 Joaquín Garrigues Walker was elected party president, while Joaquín Muñoz Peirat was appointed vice president and Ramón Pais Ferrín general secretary. On August 12, 1976 (date of its integration within the Liberal Alliance coalition) the party gathered 9 and regional parties, one student association (Independent University Party) and a group of Spaniards living abroad.

The party held negotiations in September 1977 to join the Liberal International, which were dashed when the FPDL was dissolved on 5 January 1978 to merge into the Union of the Democratic Centre (UCD).

== Federated parties ==
The FPDL was a federation of 10 parties:

- Galician Democratic Party: led by Ramón Pais Ferrín and José María García Marcos.
- Andalusian Democratic Party: led by Soledad Becerril, C. Casaño Salido and José Bernal Pérez
- Democratic Party of Castile and León: led by Antonio Fontán and L. M. Enciso
- Democratic Party of Extremadura: led by Vicente Sánchez Cuadrado.
- Democratic Liberal Party of Navarre: led by José Aizpún Tuero and Pedro Pegenaute.
- Democratic Liberal Party of the Valencian Country: led by Burguera Escrivá and Muñoz Peirats.
- Balearic Democratic Party
- Democratic Party of Murcia: led by Martínez Pujalte.
- Canarian Democratic Party: led by Diego Cambreleng Roca, Nicolás Díaz Saavedra and César Lloréns Barges.
- Independent University Party: led by Vicente López Pascual.
