= Basque Socialist Party =

Defunct political party from the Spanish Basque Country

Basque Socialist Party Euskal Sozialista Biltzarrea - Partido Socialista Vasco
- Leader: Iñaki Aldekoa; Txillardegi
- Founded: 1975
- Dissolved: 1980
- Merger of: Basque Socialist Movement; Aintzina collective
- Merged into: Herri Batasuna
- Newspaper: Aintzina
- Ideology: 1975–1977: Basque nationalism Social democracy 1977–1980: Marxism; Abertzale Left; Basque independence
- Political position: Left
- National affiliation: Herri Batasuna (1978–1980)

Party flag
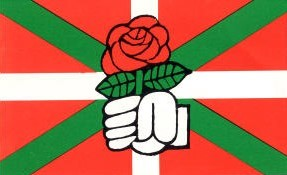

Basque Socialist Party or Basque Socialist Assembly (Spanish: Partido Socialista Vasco and Basque: Euskal Sozialista Biltzarrea; ESB–PSV) was a socialist Basque political party, with presence in the Southern Basque Country. The party was illegal until 1978.

== History ==
ESB-PSV was formed as the merge of the Basque Socialist Movement and the Aitzina group in 1975. Originally the party was social democratic and ambiguous about independence, but in 1977 ESB-PSV radicalized its positions, assuming both Basque independence and Marxism. The party participated in the Summit of Chiberta and in the Roundtable of Alsasua, being one of the founding parties of the Herri Batasuna coalition.

After a series of internal debates, ESB left Herri Batasuna in 1980, calling for abstention in the Basque elections of that year. ESB disappeared in 1980, due to its electoral failures and debts.
