= Joaquín Ruiz-Giménez =

Spanish politician and jurist

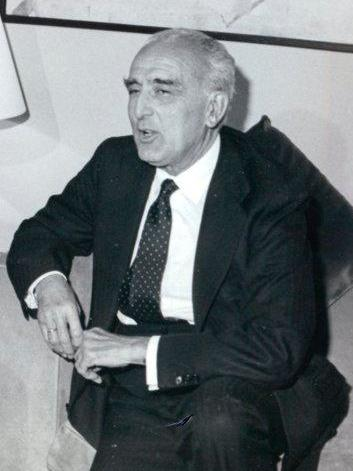
Joaquín Ruiz-Giménez (1983), then Spanish Ombudsman

Joaquín Ruiz-Giménez Cortés (2 August 1913 – 27 August 2009) was a Spanish politician and jurist. He was minister of Education under Franco (1951-1955) but he drifted apart from the Francoist State since 1956 and, adopting a Christian Democrat position, steadily started to promote a quiet transition to democracy, especially through Cuadernos para el Diálogo magazine. He was considered one of the most relevant figures of the moderate inner opposition to Francoism. Failing to play a relevant role during the 1977 democratic elections, he was later elected as the first Spanish Ombudsman. He was a member of the National Catholic Association of Propagandists.

== Biography ==
=== Early life ===
Ruiz-Giménez was born in Hoyo de Manzanares, Madrid on 2 August 1913. He was son of Joaquín Ruiz Jiménez, Liberal politician who was minister twice under Alfonso XIII and mayor of Madrid. While student at the University of Madrid, he participated actively in the students' catholic organizations and in 1935 he was elected secretary-general of the National Catholic Students Confederation. After the Civil War broke out he was imprisoned several times, but finally released he sought asylum at the Panamanian embassy, and thus he was evacuated to Marseille via Valencia. Then, he joined the Nationalist Army and served in the front of Segovia, Teruel and Maestrazgo. After the war, he graduated in Arts and held a doctorate in Law. He was appointed councilor at the Madrid city council and the same time he was Law professor at the University of Madrid. He was elected president of the Pax Romana organization between 1939 and 1946. He collaborated actively in the redaction of the Fuero de los Españoles, i.e. a sort of bill of rights promulgated by Franco in 1945. He was appointed director of the Hispanic Culture Institute (1946-1948) and ambassador to the Holy See (1948-1951), where he negotiated the terms of the 1953 Concordat.

=== From Francoist minister to Christian Democrat dissident ===
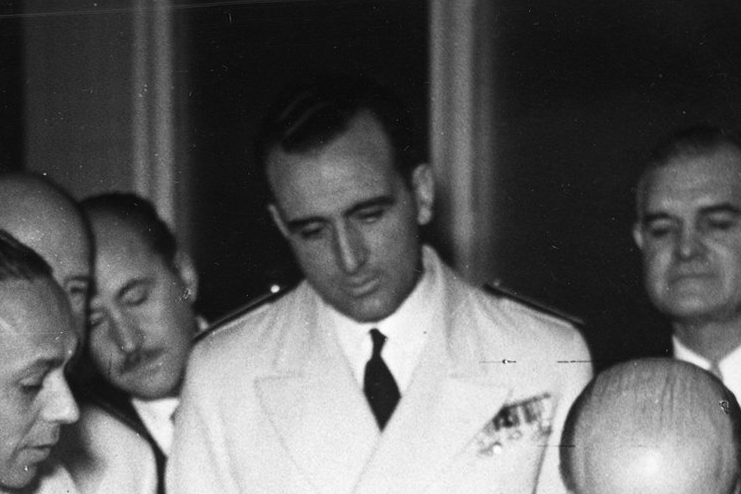
Ruiz-Giménez in 1954

In 1951, caudillo Franco appointed him minister of National Education. He established a special commission to rehabilitate some teachers and scholars who were previously expelled from their tenures by the Francoism. His political stance was gradually sympathetic toward the Christian Democracy. In 1956 he confronted the minister of Interior about a students' riot and he was finally dismissed. Franco appointed him afterwards National Counselor with seat in the Parliament. He resigned from this office in 1965.

Meanwhile, in 1963 he founded Cuadernos para el Diálogo, a political and cultural magazine that was very relevant for the Spanish political life of the 1960s and 1970s because it hosted the moderate debate about the future evolution of Spain toward a more pluralistic, participative and European-minded situation. Cuadernos para el Diálogo was the most dissident option within the legal narrow framework of freedom of speech allowed during the last decades of Franco's reign. Ruiz-Giménez himself was considered the leader of the Spanish Christian Democrats left wing.

In June 1975 he joined the underground Democratic Convergence Platform, which gathered a wide array of anti-Francoist organizations, including Social Democrats and Communists. Nevertheless, the Christian Democracy had very little option during the first democratic elections in 1977, as its political room was occupied mainly by the Suárez's UCD. Ruiz-Giménez's Democratic Left joined the Christian Democratic Federation coalition, that dissolved after its meager 1 per cent of the ballots.

=== First Spanish Ombudsman ===
After his withdrawal from the political forefront, Ruiz-Giménez was appointed Ombudsman, the first one in holding this office in Spain (1982-1987). During his later years, he enjoyed a great prestige among both left and right. He involved in several humanitarian and human-rights NGOs, presided the Spanish Committee of UNICEF (1989-2001), vice-presided the Spanish Commission of Relief to Refugees, and has been awarded and decorated several times for his philanthropic activity.

== Writings ==
- La concepción institucional del derecho, Madrid: Instituto de Estudios Políticos, 1944
- Derecho y vida humana. Algunas reflexiones a la luz de Santo Tomás, Madrid: Instituto de Estudios Políticos, 1944
- Introducción elemental a la filosofía jurídica cristiana, Madrid: Epesa, 1945
- Pío XII, la familia y otros temas, Madrid: Epesa, 1958
- La política, deber y derecho del hombre, Madrid: Epesa, 1958
- Introducción a la filosofía jurídica, Madrid: Epesa, 1960
- El ser de España, Madrid: Aguilar, 1963
- El Concilio Vaticano II y los derechos del hombre, Madrid: Edicusa, 1968
- Iglesia, Estado y sociedad en España (1930-1982), Barcelona: Argos-Vergara, 1984
- El camino hacia la democracia. Escritos en "Cuadernos para el Diálogo" (1963-1976), Madrid: Centro de Estudios Constitucionales, 1985

== Bibliography ==
- Sáez Alba, A. (1974). "Introducción a la ACNP". La otra cosa nostra. La Asociación Católica Nacional de Propagandistas y el caso de El Correo de Andalucía (in Spanish). Ruedo ibérico.
- Martín Puerta, Antonio (2015). "La Asociación Católica Nacional de Propagandistas durante la fase central del régimen de Franco". Hispania Sacra. 67 (135): 303–338. doi:10.3989/hs.2015.009. ISSN 0018-215X.
- Barreiro, Cristina (2018). "La ACNdeP y su papel político en el primer franquismo". Hispania Sacra. 70 (142): 681–689. doi:10.3989/hs.2018.047. ISSN 0018-215X. Archived from the original on 31 December 2018.
