= Basque Christian Democracy =

Basque Christian Democracy Democracia Cristiana Vasca Euskal Kristau Demokrazia
- Founded: 1976
- Ideology: Christian democracy
- Political position: Centre-right

Basque Christian Democracy (Spanish: Democracia Cristiana Vasca, DCV; Basque: Euskal Kristau Demokrazia, EKD) was a Basque Country Christian-democratic party active during the Spanish transition to democracy - legalized in 1977.

Although it was the only newly created regional right-wing party not to advocate Basque nationalism, it did not disagree with projects of regional autonomy. It ran in the Spanish 1977 election for the Constituent Cortes in all three electoral districts in the Basque Country-proper (Gipuzkoa, Vizcaya, and Álava), in contrast with the nationalist candidacies in Navarre (considered by Basque nationalists a part of the extended Basque national territory). It obtained poor results, was confirmed as the eighth party in the region (just under 26,000 votes - 2.59% of the total), and was not represented in the Cortes.

Although still registered technically, the EKD is no longer active. Most of its members joined the Democratic Center Union, with the exception of such activists as Fernando Buesa, who became active in the Socialist Party of the Basque Country.

== See also ==
- Category:Basque Christian Democracy politicians
