= Garrido (surname) =

Garrido is a Spanish surname, meaning "handsome", "beautiful," or "elegant". Notable people with the surname include:

- Adriano Garrido (born 1972), Brazilian beach volleyball player
- Alberto Garrido (1949–2007), Argentine-Venezuelan journalist
- Antonio Garrido (actor) (born 1971), Spanish actor and TV presenter
- Antonio Garrido (golfer) (born 1944), Spanish golfer
- António Garrido (referee) (1932–2014), Portuguese football referee
- Augie Garrido (1939–2018), American baseball coach
- Carlos Garrido (footballer, born 1977), Chilean footballer
- Carlos Rafael Uribazo Garrido (born 1951), Cuban artist
- Carlota Garrido de la Peña (1870–1958), Argentine journalist, writer, teacher
- Celso Garrido Lecca (1926–2025), Peruvian composer
- David Garrido, journalist and sports presenter
- Elisa Garrido (1909–1990), Aragonese anti-fascist fighter
- Fanny Garrido (1846–1917), Spanish writer
- Francisco Garrido Peña (born 1958), Spanish politician
- Germán Garrido (born 1948), Spanish golfer
- Gil Garrido Sr. (1919-?), Panamanian baseball player
- Gil Garrido (born 1941), Panamanian baseball player, son of Gil Sr.
- Hector Garrido, American pulp fiction cover illustrator
- Ignacio Garrido (born 1972), Spanish golfer
- Javier Garrido (born 1985), Spanish football player
- José Antonio Garrido (born 1975), Spanish road bicycle racer
- José María Rojas Garrido (1824–1883), Colombian politician
- Juan Garrido (c.1480–c.1550), African conquistador in the service of Spain
- Juan Carlos Garrido (born 1969), Spanish football manager
- Leandro Ramón Garrido (1868–1909), Spanish-English painter based in France
- Lizardo Garrido (born 1957), Chilean footballer
- Lucas Lara Garrido (1966–2006), Spanish astrophysicist
- Luis de Garrido (born 1960), Spanish architect
- Luis Garrido, Honduran football player
- Luis Javier Garrido (1941–2012), Mexican political analyst
- Luis Ramón Garrido (born 1996), Mexican badminton player
- Manuel Rivera Garrido (born 1978), Peruvian football player
- Marissa Garrido (1926–2021), Mexican telenovela playwright and writer
- Miguel Ángel Garrido Gallardo (born 1945), Spanish philologist and semiotician, professor of literary theory
- Nancy Garrido (born 1955), American nursing aide and wife of Phillip
- Norberto Garrido (born 1972), American football player
- Pablo Garrido (born 1938), Mexican athlete
- Phillip Garrido (born 1951), American sex offender who along with his wife, Nancy, kidnapped 11‑year-old Jaycee Lee Dugard and held her captive for 18 years
- Raúl Hernández Garrido (born 1964), Spanish playwright
- Reynaldo Garrido (1934–2024), Cuban tennis player

== See also ==
- Garrido (grape), a Spanish wine grape
