= Burgos (Congress of Deputies constituency) =

Electoral constituency in Spain

Coordinates: 42°23′N 3°40′W

- Congress of Deputies; Electoral constituency
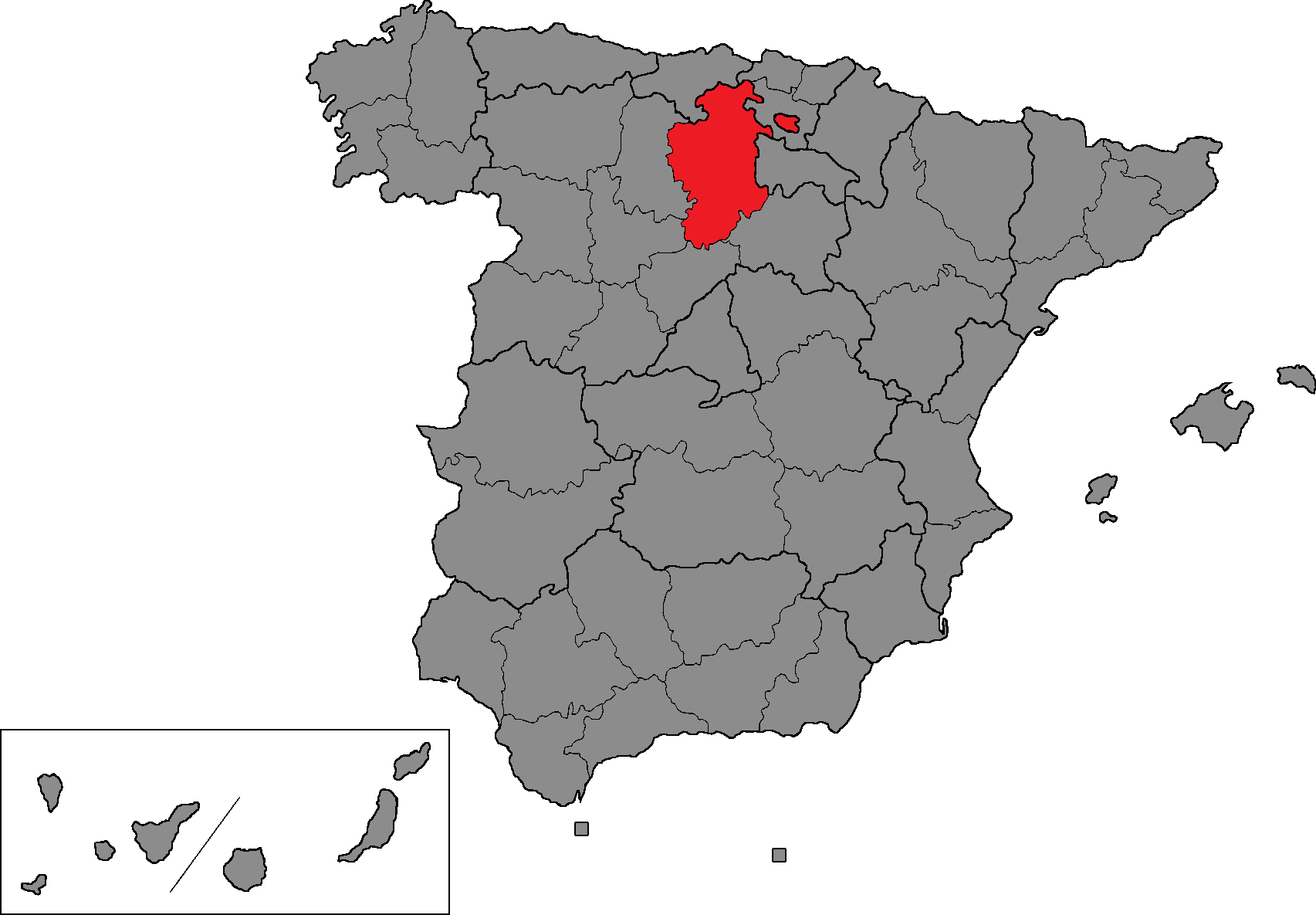
- Location of Burgos within Spain
- Province: Burgos
- Autonomous community: Castile and León
- Population: ▲358,948 (2024)
- Electorate: ▼296,401 (2023)
- Major settlements: Burgos

Current constituency
- Created: 1977
- Seats: 4
- Members: PP (2); PSOE (2)

Burgos is one of the 52 constituencies represented in the Congress of Deputies, the lower chamber of the Spanish parliament, the Cortes Generales. The constituency (whose boundaries correspond to those of the homonymous province) currently elects four deputies. The electoral system uses the D'Hondt method and closed-list proportional voting, with a minimum threshold of three percent.

== Electoral system ==
The constituency was created as per the Political Reform Law and was first contested in the 1977 general election. The Law provided for the provinces of Spain to be established as multi-member districts in the Congress of Deputies, with this regulation being maintained under the Spanish Constitution of 1978. Additionally, the Constitution requires for any modification of the provincial limits to be approved under an organic law, needing an absolute majority in the Cortes Generales.

Voting is based on universal suffrage, comprising all Spanish nationals over 18 years of age with full political rights, provided that they have not been deprived of the right to vote by a final sentence. The only exception was in 1977, when this was limited to nationals over 21 years of age and in full enjoyment of their political and civil rights. Amendments in 2011 required non-resident citizens to apply for voting, a system known as "begged" voting (Spanish: Voto rogado). which was abolished in 2022. Further, amendments in 2018 granted the right to vote to those legally incapacitated. The Congress of Deputies has a minimum of 300 and a maximum of 400 seats, with electoral provisions fixing its size at 350. Of these, 348 are elected in 50 multi-member constituencies corresponding to the provinces of Spain—each of which is assigned an initial minimum of two seats and the remaining 248 distributed in proportion to population—using the D'Hondt method and closed-list proportional voting, with a three percent-threshold of valid votes (including blank ballots) in each constituency. The remaining two seats are allocated to Ceuta and Melilla as single-member districts elected by plurality voting. The use of this electoral method may result in a higher effective threshold depending on district magnitude and vote distribution. The law does not provide for by-elections to fill vacant seats; instead, any vacancies arising after the proclamation of candidates and during the legislative term are filled by the next candidates on the party lists or, when required, by designated substitutes.

The electoral law allows for parties and federations registered in the interior ministry, alliances and groupings of electors to present lists of candidates. Parties and federations intending to form an alliance are required to inform the relevant electoral commission within 10 days of the election call—15 before 1985—whereas groupings of electors need to secure the signature of at least one percent of the electorate in the constituencies for which they seek election—one permille of the electorate, with a compulsory minimum of 500 signatures, until 1985—disallowing electors from signing for more than one list. Also since 2011, parties, federations or alliances that have not obtained a mandate in either chamber of the Cortes at the preceding election are required to secure the signature of at least 0.1 percent of electors in the aforementioned constituencies. Amendments in 2007 required a balanced composition of men and women in the electoral lists, so that candidates of either sex made up at least 40 percent of the total composition; further amendments in 2024 required the use of a zipper system.

== Deputies ==
Deputies 1977–present
Key to parties U.Podemos Podemos PSOE Cs UCD PP CP AP
Legislature	Election	Distribution
Constituent	1977	1 / 3
1st	1979	1 / 3
2nd	1982	2 / 2
3rd	1986	2 / 2
4th	1989	2 / 2
5th	1993	2 / 2
6th	1996	1 / 3
7th	2000	1 / 3
8th	2004	2 / 2
9th	2008	2 / 2
10th	2011	1 / 3
11th	2015	1 / 1 / 2
12th	2016	1 / 1 / 2
13th	2019 (Apr)	2 / 1 / 1
14th	2019 (Nov)	2 / 2
15th	2023	2 / 2

== General elections ==
=== 2026 ===
Summary of the 29 November 2026 Congress of Deputies election results in Burgos
Parties and alliances	Popular vote			Seats	
Parties and alliances	Votes	%	±pp	Total	+/−
People's Party (PP)					
Spanish Socialist Workers' Party (PSOE)					
Vox (Vox)					
Broad Front (FA)^{1}			n/a		
We Can (Podemos)^{1}			n/a		
Workers' Front (FO)					
For a Fairer World (M+J)					
Communist Party of the Workers of Spain (PCTE)					
The Party is Over (SALF)			New		
Blank ballots					
Total				4	±0
Valid votes					
Invalid votes					
Votes cast / turnout					
Abstentions					
Registered voters	300,630				
Sources
Footnotes: ^{1} Within the Unite alliance in the 2023 election.

=== 2023 ===
Summary of the 23 July 2023 Congress of Deputies election results in Burgos
Parties and alliances	Popular vote			Seats	
Parties and alliances	Votes	%	±pp	Total	+/−
People's Party (PP)	82,329	40.64	+9.87	2	±0
Spanish Socialist Workers' Party (PSOE)	69,775	34.45	+2.19	2	±0
Vox (Vox)	25,858	12.77	–2.10	0	±0
Unite (Sumar)^{1}	17,508	8.64	–2.45	0	±0
Burgalese Way (VB)	1,774	0.88	New	0	±0
Empty Spain–Castilian Party–Commoners' Land (EV–PCAS–TC)	1,184	0.58	New	0	±0
Animalist Party with the Environment (PACMA)^{2}	943	0.47	–0.24	0	±0
Workers' Front (FO)	490	0.24	New	0	±0
For a Fairer World (PUM+J)	354	0.17	–0.14	0	±0
Communist Party of the Workers of Spain (PCTE)	349	0.17	–0.03	0	±0
Zero Cuts (Recortes Cero)	154	0.08	–0.24	0	±0
Blank ballots	1,851	0.91	–0.41		
Total	202,569			4	±0
Valid votes	202,569	98.87	+0.21		
Invalid votes	2,317	1.13	–0.21		
Votes cast / turnout	204,886	69.12	+1.67		
Abstentions	91,515	30.88	–1.67		
Registered voters	296,401				
Sources
Footnotes: ^{1} Unite results are compared to United We Can totals in the November 2019 election.; ^{2} Animalist Party with the Environment results are compared to Animalist Party Against Mistreatment of Animals totals in the November 2019 election.

=== November 2019 ===
Summary of the 10 November 2019 Congress of Deputies election results in Burgos
Parties and alliances	Popular vote			Seats	
Parties and alliances	Votes	%	±pp	Total	+/−
Spanish Socialist Workers' Party (PSOE)	64,182	32.26	+2.98	2	±0
People's Party (PP)	61,228	30.77	+6.21	2	+1
Vox (Vox)	29,579	14.87	+3.76	0	±0
United We Can (Podemos–IU)	22,058	11.09	–1.41	0	±0
Citizens–Party of the Citizenry (Cs)	16,214	8.15	–11.68	0	–1
Animalist Party Against Mistreatment of Animals (PACMA)	1,415	0.71	–0.19	0	±0
Zero Cuts–Green Group–PCAS–TC (Recortes Cero–GV–PCAS–TC)	645	0.32	–0.01	0	±0
For a Fairer World (PUM+J)	620	0.31	+0.04	0	±0
Communist Party of the Workers of Spain (PCTE)	404	0.20	+0.01	0	±0
Blank ballots	2,626	1.32	+0.28		
Total	198,971			4	±0
Valid votes	198,971	98.66	+0.02		
Invalid votes	2,693	1.34	–0.02		
Votes cast / turnout	201,664	67.45	–6.91		
Abstentions	97,325	32.55	+6.91		
Registered voters	298,989				

=== April 2019 ===
Summary of the 28 April 2019 Congress of Deputies election results in Burgos
Parties and alliances	Popular vote			Seats	
Parties and alliances	Votes	%	±pp	Total	+/−
Spanish Socialist Workers' Party (PSOE)	64,287	29.28	+7.19	2	+1
People's Party (PP)	53,926	24.56	–18.34	1	–1
Citizens–Party of the Citizenry (Cs)	43,533	19.83	+5.16	1	+1
United We Can (Podemos–IU–Equo)	27,436	12.50	–4.75	0	–1
Vox (Vox)	24,382	11.11	+10.80	0	±0
Animalist Party Against Mistreatment of Animals (PACMA)	1,981	0.90	+0.04	0	±0
Zero Cuts–Green Group–PCAS–TC (Recortes Cero–GV–PCAS–TC)	715	0.33	+0.11	0	±0
For a Fairer World (PUM+J)	597	0.27	New	0	±0
Communist Party of the Workers of Spain (PCTE)	421	0.19	New	0	±0
Blank ballots	2,275	1.04	+0.16		
Total	219,553			4	±0
Valid votes	219,553	98.64	–0.28		
Invalid votes	3,027	1.36	+0.28		
Votes cast / turnout	222,580	74.36	+4.67		
Abstentions	76,757	25.64	–4.67		
Registered voters	299,337				

=== 2016 ===
Summary of the 26 June 2016 Congress of Deputies election results in Burgos
Parties and alliances	Popular vote			Seats	
Parties and alliances	Votes	%	±pp	Total	+/−
People's Party (PP)	88,785	42.90	+4.88	2	±0
Spanish Socialist Workers' Party (PSOE)	45,724	22.09	+1.40	1	±0
United We Can (Podemos–IU–Equo)^{1}	35,705	17.25	–4.52	1	±0
Citizens–Party of the Citizenry (C's)	30,361	14.67	–0.88	0	±0
Animalist Party Against Mistreatment of Animals (PACMA)	1,782	0.86	+0.20	0	±0
Union, Progress and Democracy (UPyD)	788	0.38	–0.71	0	±0
Vox (Vox)	647	0.31	–0.12	0	±0
Zero Cuts–Green Group (Recortes Cero–GV)	456	0.22	+0.01	0	±0
Merindades of Castile Initiative (IMC)	356	0.17	New	0	±0
Communist Party of the Peoples of Spain (PCPE)	287	0.14	–0.09	0	±0
Internationalist Solidarity and Self-Management (SAIn)	278	0.13	–0.10	0	±0
Blank ballots	1,812	0.88	–0.07		
Total	206,981			4	±0
Valid votes	206,981	98.92	–0.05		
Invalid votes	2,265	1.08	+0.05		
Votes cast / turnout	209,246	69.69	–2.75		
Abstentions	90,997	30.31	+2.75		
Registered voters	300,243				
Sources
Footnotes: ^{1} United We Can results are compared to the combined totals of We Can and United Left–Popular Unity in Common in the 2015 election.

=== 2015 ===
Summary of the 20 December 2015 Congress of Deputies election results in Burgos
Parties and alliances	Popular vote			Seats	
Parties and alliances	Votes	%	±pp	Total	+/−
People's Party (PP)	82,037	38.02	–16.19	2	–1
Spanish Socialist Workers' Party (PSOE)	44,640	20.69	–7.28	1	±0
We Can (Podemos)	36,818	17.06	New	1	+1
Citizens–Party of the Citizenry (C's)	33,558	15.55	New	0	±0
United Left–Popular Unity in Common (IU–UPeC)	10,171	4.71	–0.84	0	±0
Union, Progress and Democracy (UPyD)	2,356	1.09	–6.43	0	±0
Animalist Party Against Mistreatment of Animals (PACMA)	1,431	0.66	+0.19	0	±0
Vox (Vox)	926	0.43	New	0	±0
Communist Party of the Peoples of Spain (PCPE)	507	0.23	New	0	±0
Internationalist Solidarity and Self-Management (SAIn)	501	0.23	+0.02	0	±0
Zero Cuts–Green Group (Recortes Cero–GV)	452	0.21	New	0	±0
Feminist Initiative (IFem)	341	0.16	New	0	±0
Blank ballots	2,049	0.95	–0.90		
Total	215,787			4	±0
Valid votes	215,787	98.97	+0.46		
Invalid votes	2,250	1.03	–0.46		
Votes cast / turnout	218,037	72.44	+0.74		
Abstentions	82,948	27.56	–0.74		
Registered voters	300,985				

=== 2011 ===
Summary of the 20 November 2011 Congress of Deputies election results in Burgos
Parties and alliances	Popular vote			Seats	
Parties and alliances	Votes	%	±pp	Total	+/−
People's Party (PP)	116,057	54.21	+3.70	3	+1
Spanish Socialist Workers' Party (PSOE)	59,878	27.97	–12.49	1	–1
Union, Progress and Democracy (UPyD)	16,090	7.52	+5.41	0	±0
United Left of Castile and León: Plural Left (IUCyL)	11,892	5.55	+2.66	0	±0
Equo (Equo)	1,938	0.91	New	0	±0
Party of Castile and León (PCAL)^{1}	1,515	0.71	–0.06	0	±0
Animalist Party Against Mistreatment of Animals (PACMA)	1,007	0.47	+0.28	0	±0
For a Fairer World (PUM+J)	605	0.28	+0.18	0	±0
Anti-capitalists (Anticapitalistas)	502	0.23	New	0	±0
Internationalist Solidarity and Self-Management (SAIn)	454	0.21	+0.11	0	±0
Citizens of Democratic Centre (CCD)	203	0.09	New	0	±0
Blank ballots	3,952	1.85	+0.46		
Total	214,093			4	±0
Valid votes	214,093	98.51	–0.94		
Invalid votes	3,235	1.49	+0.94		
Votes cast / turnout	217,328	71.70	–5.75		
Abstentions	85,781	28.30	+5.75		
Registered voters	303,109				
Sources
Footnotes: ^{1} Party of Castile and León results are compared to Commoners' Land totals in the 2008 election.

=== 2008 ===
Summary of the 9 March 2008 Congress of Deputies election results in Burgos
Parties and alliances	Popular vote			Seats	
Parties and alliances	Votes	%	±pp	Total	+/−
People's Party (PP)	117,613	50.51	–1.45	2	±0
Spanish Socialist Workers' Party (PSOE)	94,202	40.46	+1.53	2	±0
United Left–Alternative (IU)	6,735	2.89	–0.38	0	±0
Union, Progress and Democracy (UPyD)	4,922	2.11	New	0	±0
Commoners' Land (TC)	1,790	0.77	–0.60	0	±0
The Greens–Green Group (LV–GV)	774	0.33	–0.34	0	±0
The Greens of Europe (LVdE)	467	0.20	New	0	±0
Anti-Bullfighting Party Against Mistreatment of Animals (PACMA)	444	0.19	New	0	±0
National Democracy (DN)	332	0.14	+0.08	0	±0
Social Democratic Party (PSD)	281	0.12	New	0	±0
Citizens for Blank Votes (CenB)	261	0.11	–0.30	0	±0
For a Fairer World (PUM+J)	242	0.10	New	0	±0
Internationalist Solidarity and Self-Management (SAIn)	223	0.10	New	0	±0
Merindades of Castile Initiative (IMC)	202	0.09	New	0	±0
Communist Party of the Peoples of Spain (PCPE)	170	0.07	±0.00	0	±0
Citizens–Party of the Citizenry (C's)	127	0.05	New	0	±0
Alliance for Burgos (AxB)	123	0.05	New	0	±0
Spanish Phalanx of the CNSO (FE de las JONS)	117	0.05	±0.00	0	±0
Burgalese Citizen Initiative (ICBur)	109	0.05	New	0	±0
Authentic Phalanx (FA)	106	0.05	+0.02	0	±0
Family and Life Party (PFyV)	99	0.04	–0.06	0	±0
Citizen Group (AGRUCI)	79	0.03	New	0	±0
Humanist Party (PH)	58	0.02	–0.06	0	±0
Spanish Alternative (AES)	51	0.02	New	0	±0
Spain 2000 (E–2000)	45	0.02	New	0	±0
Carlist Party (PC)	43	0.02	–0.01	0	±0
Blank ballots	3,236	1.39	–1.18		
Total	232,851			4	±0
Valid votes	232,851	99.45	+0.16		
Invalid votes	1,279	0.55	–0.16		
Votes cast / turnout	234,130	77.45	–0.82		
Abstentions	68,172	22.55	+0.82		
Registered voters	302,302				

=== 2004 ===
Summary of the 14 March 2004 Congress of Deputies election results in Burgos
Parties and alliances	Popular vote			Seats	
Parties and alliances	Votes	%	±pp	Total	+/−
People's Party (PP)	122,415	51.96	–6.40	2	–1
Spanish Socialist Workers' Party (PSOE)	91,727	38.93	+9.92	2	+1
United Left (IU)	7,703	3.27	–1.31	0	±0
Commoners' Land–Castilian Nationalist Party (TC–PNC)	3,218	1.37	–3.07	0	±0
The Greens–Green Group (LV–GV)	1,581	0.67	New	0	±0
Citizens for Blank Votes (CenB)	963	0.41	New	0	±0
Democratic and Social Centre (CDS)	422	0.18	+0.04	0	±0
Family and Life Party (PFyV)	227	0.10	New	0	±0
Republican Left (IR)	214	0.09	New	0	±0
Humanist Party (PH)	179	0.08	–0.03	0	±0
Spanish Democratic Party (PADE)	176	0.07	–0.09	0	±0
Communist Party of the Castilian People (PCPC–PCPE)	155	0.07	New	0	±0
National Democracy (DN)	148	0.06	New	0	±0
Spanish Phalanx of the CNSO (FE de las JONS)^{1}	118	0.05	±0.00	0	±0
The Phalanx (FE)	113	0.05	–0.01	0	±0
Authentic Phalanx (FA)	74	0.03	New	0	±0
Carlist Party (PC)	63	0.03	New	0	±0
Republican Social Movement (MSR)	55	0.02	New	0	±0
Blank ballots	6,046	2.57	±0.00		
Total	235,597			4	±0
Valid votes	235,597	99.29	–0.06		
Invalid votes	1,694	0.71	+0.06		
Votes cast / turnout	237,291	78.27	+4.67		
Abstentions	65,886	21.73	–4.67		
Registered voters	303,177				
Sources
Footnotes: ^{1} Spanish Phalanx of the CNSO results are compared to Independent Spanish Phalanx–Phalanx 2000 totals in the 2000 election.

=== 2000 ===
Summary of the 12 March 2000 Congress of Deputies election results in Burgos
Parties and alliances	Popular vote			Seats	
Parties and alliances	Votes	%	±pp	Total	+/−
People's Party (PP)	129,501	58.36	+3.99	3	±0
Spanish Socialist Workers' Party–Progressives (PSOE–p)	64,358	29.01	–1.77	1	±0
United Left (IU)	10,153	4.58	–6.51	0	±0
Commoners' Land–Castilian Nationalist Party (TC–PNC)	9,862	4.44	+3.07	0	±0
Natural Law Party (PLN)	521	0.23	New	0	±0
Regionalist Unity of Castile and León (URCL)	464	0.21	–0.06	0	±0
Spanish Democratic Party (PADE)	355	0.16	New	0	±0
Centrist Union–Democratic and Social Centre (UC–CDS)	318	0.14	–0.08	0	±0
Humanist Party (PH)	252	0.11	New	0	±0
The Phalanx (FE)	143	0.06	New	0	±0
Spain 2000 Platform (ES2000)	139	0.06	New	0	±0
Independent Spanish Phalanx–Phalanx 2000 (FEI–FE 2000)	113	0.05	New	0	±0
Blank ballots	5,704	2.57	+0.96		
Total	221,883			4	±0
Valid votes	221,883	99.35	+0.14		
Invalid votes	1,449	0.65	–0.14		
Votes cast / turnout	223,332	73.60	–4.55		
Abstentions	80,121	26.40	+4.55		
Registered voters	303,453				

=== 1996 ===
Summary of the 3 March 1996 Congress of Deputies election results in Burgos
Parties and alliances	Popular vote			Seats	
Parties and alliances	Votes	%	±pp	Total	+/−
People's Party (PP)	126,837	54.37	+4.80	3	+1
Spanish Socialist Workers' Party (PSOE)	71,804	30.78	–3.41	1	–1
United Left of Castile and León (IUCL)	25,880	11.09	+2.04	0	±0
Commoners' Land–Castilian Nationalist Party (TC–PNC)	3,205	1.37	+0.65	0	±0
Regionalist Unity of Castile and León (URCL)	632	0.27	New	0	±0
Centrist Union (UC)	524	0.22	–2.78	0	±0
Workers' Revolutionary Party (PRT)	378	0.16	New	0	±0
Authentic Spanish Phalanx (FEA)	264	0.11	New	0	±0
Blank ballots	3,753	1.61	+0.22		
Total	233,277			4	±0
Valid votes	233,277	99.21	+0.15		
Invalid votes	1,856	0.79	–0.15		
Votes cast / turnout	235,133	78.15	+0.36		
Abstentions	65,752	21.85	–0.36		
Registered voters	300,885				

=== 1993 ===
Summary of the 6 June 1993 Congress of Deputies election results in Burgos
Parties and alliances	Popular vote			Seats	
Parties and alliances	Votes	%	±pp	Total	+/−
People's Party (PP)	111,439	49.57	+6.11	2	±0
Spanish Socialist Workers' Party (PSOE)	76,863	34.19	+1.85	2	±0
United Left (IU)	20,343	9.05	+1.18	0	±0
Democratic and Social Centre (CDS)	6,734	3.00	–7.80	0	±0
The Greens (Verdes)	1,907	0.85	New	0	±0
Commoners' Land–Castilian Nationalist Party (TC–PNC)	1,622	0.72	New	0	±0
The Ecologists (LE)	920	0.41	–1.33	0	±0
Ruiz-Mateos Group–European Democratic Alliance (ARM–ADE)	579	0.26	–0.82	0	±0
Castilianist Union (UC)	446	0.20	New	0	±0
Spanish Phalanx of the CNSO (FE–JONS)	176	0.08	–0.11	0	±0
Coalition for a New Socialist Party (CNPS)	165	0.07	New	0	±0
Gray Panthers of Spain (ACI)	161	0.07	New	0	±0
Natural Law Party (PLN)	128	0.06	New	0	±0
Party of El Bierzo (PB)	117	0.05	New	0	±0
Humanist Party (PH)	113	0.05	–0.14	0	±0
Communist Unification of Spain (UCE)	0	0.00	New	0	±0
Blank ballots	3,121	1.39	+0.21		
Total	224,834			4	±0
Valid votes	224,834	99.06	+0.22		
Invalid votes	2,136	0.94	–0.22		
Votes cast / turnout	226,970	77.79	+5.52		
Abstentions	64,806	22.21	–5.52		
Registered voters	291,776				

=== 1989 ===
Summary of the 29 October 1989 Congress of Deputies election results in Burgos
Parties and alliances	Popular vote			Seats	
Parties and alliances	Votes	%	±pp	Total	+/−
People's Party (PP)^{1}	88,446	43.46	+3.95	2	±0
Spanish Socialist Workers' Party (PSOE)	65,811	32.34	–4.84	2	±0
Democratic and Social Centre (CDS)	21,973	10.80	–3.35	0	±0
United Left (IU)	16,010	7.87	+5.15	0	±0
The Ecologist Greens (LVE)	3,544	1.74	New	0	±0
Ruiz-Mateos Group (Ruiz-Mateos)	2,202	1.08	New	0	±0
Workers' Socialist Party (PST)	1,244	0.61	–0.31	0	±0
Workers' Party of Spain–Communist Unity (PTE–UC)^{2}	613	0.30	–0.71	0	±0
Communist Party of the Peoples of Spain (PCPE)	487	0.24	New	0	±0
Spanish Phalanx of the CNSO (FE–JONS)	391	0.19	–0.25	0	±0
Humanist Party (PH)	389	0.19	New	0	±0
Blank ballots	2,398	1.18	+0.18		
Total	203,508			4	±0
Valid votes	203,508	98.84	+0.84		
Invalid votes	2,395	1.16	–0.84		
Votes cast / turnout	205,903	72.27	+0.76		
Abstentions	79,000	27.73	–0.76		
Registered voters	284,903				
Sources
Footnotes: ^{1} People's Party results are compared to People's Coalition totals in the 1986 election.; ^{2} Workers' Party of Spain–Communist Unity results are compared to Communists' Unity Board totals in the 1986 election.

=== 1986 ===
Summary of the 22 June 1986 Congress of Deputies election results in Burgos
Parties and alliances	Popular vote			Seats	
Parties and alliances	Votes	%	±pp	Total	+/−
People's Coalition (AP–PDP–PL)^{1}	79,153	39.51	–3.44	2	±0
Spanish Socialist Workers' Party (PSOE)	74,484	37.18	–0.41	2	±0
Democratic and Social Centre (CDS)	28,353	14.15	+9.24	0	±0
United Left (IU)^{2}	5,439	2.72	+0.96	0	±0
Democratic Reformist Party (PRD)	4,476	2.23	New	0	±0
Communists' Unity Board (MUC)	2,029	1.01	New	0	±0
Workers' Socialist Party (PST)	1,839	0.92	+0.11	0	±0
Communist Unification of Spain (UCE)	931	0.46	+0.15	0	±0
Spanish Phalanx of the CNSO (FE–JONS)	876	0.44	+0.42	0	±0
Republican Popular Unity (UPR)^{3}	733	0.37	+0.20	0	±0
Party of the Communists of Catalonia (PCC)	8	0.00	New	0	±0
Blank ballots	1,997	1.00	+0.21		
Total	200,318			4	±0
Valid votes	200,318	98.00	+0.29		
Invalid votes	4,095	2.00	–0.29		
Votes cast / turnout	204,413	71.51	–7.72		
Abstentions	81,447	28.49	+7.72		
Registered voters	285,860				
Sources
Footnotes: ^{1} People's Coalition results are compared to People's Alliance–People's Democratic Party totals in the 1982 election.; ^{2} United Left results are compared to Communist Party of Spain totals in the 1982 election.; ^{3} Republican Popular Unity results are compared to Communist Party of Spain (Marxist–Leninist) totals in the 1982 election.

=== 1982 ===
Summary of the 28 October 1982 Congress of Deputies election results in Burgos
Parties and alliances	Popular vote			Seats	
Parties and alliances	Votes	%	±pp	Total	+/−
People's Alliance–People's Democratic Party (AP–PDP)^{1}	90,969	42.95	+34.76	2	+2
Spanish Socialist Workers' Party (PSOE)	79,626	37.59	+14.63	2	+1
Union of the Democratic Centre (UCD)	20,609	9.73	–43.21	0	–3
Democratic and Social Centre (CDS)	10,404	4.91	New	0	±0
Communist Party of Spain (PCE)	3,737	1.76	–2.23	0	±0
Workers' Socialist Party (PST)	1,724	0.81	New	0	±0
New Force (FN)^{2}	919	0.43	–3.40	0	±0
Communist Unification of Spain (UCE)	660	0.31	New	0	±0
Spanish Solidarity (SE)	630	0.30	New	0	±0
Communist Party of Spain (Marxist–Leninist) (PCE (m–l))	366	0.17	New	0	±0
Communist Unity Candidacy (CUC)	360	0.17	New	0	±0
Revolutionary Communist League (LCR)	69	0.03	–0.43	0	±0
Spanish Phalanx of the CNSO (FE–JONS)	46	0.02	New	0	±0
Communist Movement of Castile and León (MC–CL)	28	0.01	–0.62	0	±0
Socialist Party (PS)^{3}	0	0.00	–1.25	0	±0
Communist League–Internationalist Socialist Workers' Coalition (LC (COSI))	0	0.00	New	0	±0
Blank ballots	1,667	0.79	+0.22		
Total	211,814			4	±0
Valid votes	211,814	97.71	–0.61		
Invalid votes	4,965	2.29	+0.61		
Votes cast / turnout	216,779	79.23	+11.27		
Abstentions	56,832	20.77	–11.27		
Registered voters	273,611				
Sources
Footnotes: ^{1} People's Alliance–People's Democratic Party results are compared to Democratic Coalition totals in the 1979 election.; ^{2} New Force results are compared to National Union totals in the 1979 election.; ^{3} Socialist Party results are compared to Spanish Socialist Workers' Party (historical) totals in the 1979 election.

=== 1979 ===
Summary of the 1 March 1979 Congress of Deputies election results in Burgos
Parties and alliances	Popular vote			Seats	
Parties and alliances	Votes	%	±pp	Total	+/−
Union of the Democratic Centre (UCD)	95,425	52.94	+4.97	3	±0
Spanish Socialist Workers' Party (PSOE)^{1}	41,394	22.96	–4.02	1	±0
Democratic Coalition (CD)^{2}	14,759	8.19	–7.22	0	±0
Communist Party of Spain (PCE)	7,189	3.99	+1.43	0	±0
National Union (UN)^{3}	6,900	3.83	+3.10	0	±0
Nationalist Party of Castile and León (PANCAL)	2,636	1.46	New	0	±0
Workers' Revolutionary Organization (ORT)^{4}	2,288	1.27	+0.44	0	±0
Spanish Socialist Workers' Party (historical) (PSOEh)^{5}	2,250	1.25	+0.79	0	±0
Party of Labour of Spain (PTE)^{6}	2,215	1.23	–0.47	0	±0
Communist Movement–Organization of Communist Left (MC–OIC)	1,139	0.63	New	0	±0
Spanish Ruralist Party (PRE)	963	0.53	New	0	±0
Revolutionary Communist League (LCR)	837	0.46	New	0	±0
Spanish Phalanx of the CNSO (Authentic) (FE–JONS(A))	729	0.40	New	0	±0
Carlist Party (PC)	499	0.28	New	0	±0
Blank ballots	1,026	0.57	+0.17		
Total	180,249			4	±0
Valid votes	180,249	98.32	±0.00		
Invalid votes	3,087	1.68	±0.00		
Votes cast / turnout	183,336	67.96	–11.36		
Abstentions	86,435	32.04	+11.36		
Registered voters	269,771				
Sources
Footnotes: ^{1} Spanish Socialist Workers' Party results are compared to the combined totals of Spanish Socialist Workers' Party and People's Socialist Party–Socialist Unity in the 1977 election.; ^{2} Democratic Coalition results are compared to People's Alliance totals in the 1977 election.; ^{3} National Union results are compared to National Alliance July 18 totals in the 1977 election.; ^{4} Workers' Revolutionary Organization results are compared to Workers' Electoral Group totals in the 1977 election.; ^{5} Spanish Socialist Workers' Party (historical) results are compared to Democratic Socialist Alliance totals in the 1977 election.; ^{6} Party of Labour of Spain results are compared to Democratic Left Front totals in the 1977 election.

=== 1977 ===
Summary of the 15 June 1977 Congress of Deputies election results in Burgos
Parties and alliances	Popular vote			Seats	
Parties and alliances	Votes	%	±pp	Total	+/−
Union of the Democratic Centre (UCD)	89,363	47.97	n/a	3	n/a
Spanish Socialist Workers' Party (PSOE)	44,388	23.83	n/a	1	n/a
People's Alliance (AP)	28,707	15.41	n/a	0	n/a
People's Socialist Party–Socialist Unity (PSP–US)	5,870	3.15	n/a	0	n/a
Communist Party of Spain (PCE)	4,765	2.56	n/a	0	n/a
Democratic Left Front (FDI)	3,172	1.70	n/a	0	n/a
Federation of Christian Democracy (FPD–ID)	3,012	1.62	n/a	0	n/a
Spanish Social Reform (RSE)	1,881	1.01	n/a	0	n/a
Workers' Electoral Group (AET)	1,552	0.83	n/a	0	n/a
National Alliance July 18 (AN18)	1,366	0.73	n/a	0	n/a
Democratic Socialist Alliance (ASDCI)	866	0.46	n/a	0	n/a
National Association for the Study of Current Problems (ANEPA–CP)	616	0.33	n/a	0	n/a
Blank ballots	743	0.40	n/a		
Total	186,301			4	n/a
Valid votes	186,301	98.32	n/a		
Invalid votes	3,184	1.68	n/a		
Votes cast / turnout	189,485	79.32	n/a		
Abstentions	49,400	20.68	n/a		
Registered voters	238,885				

== Bibliography ==
- Ley 1/1977, de 4 de enero, para la Reforma Política (Fundamental Law 1/1977). Official State Gazette (in Spanish). 4 January 1977. BOE-A-1977-165.
- Real Decreto-ley 20/1977, de 18 de marzo, sobre Normas Electorales (Royal Decree-Law 20/1977). Official State Gazette (in Spanish). 18 March 1977. BOE-A-1977-7445.
- Constitución Española (Constitution). Official State Gazette (in Spanish). 27 December 1978. BOE-A-1978-31229.
- Ley Orgánica 5/1985, de 19 de junio, del Régimen Electoral General (Organic Law 5/1985). Official State Gazette (in Spanish). 19 June 1985. BOE-A-1985-11672.
- Carreras de Odriozola, Albert; Tafunell Sambola, Xavier (2005) [1989]. Estadísticas históricas de España, siglos XIX-XX (PDF) (in Spanish). Vol. 1 (II ed.). Bilbao: Fundación BBVA. pp. 1072–1097. ISBN 84-96515-00-1. Archived from the original (PDF) on 24 September 2015.
