= Jaén =

Jaén may refer to:

== Places ==
=== Peru ===
- Jaén Province, Peru, a province in Cajamarca Region, Peru
  - Jaén District, one of twelve districts of the province Jaén in Peru
    - Jaén, Peru, a city in Peru, capital of the Jaén Province

=== Philippines ===
- Jaen, Nueva Ecija, a municipality in the Philippines

=== Spain ===
- Kingdom of Jaén, a territorial jurisdiction of the Crown of Castile from 1246 to 1833
- Province of Jaén (Spain), a province in southern Spain
  - Jaén (Congress of Deputies constituency), the electoral district used for the Spanish Congress of Deputies, corresponding to the province of Jaén
  - Jaén, Spain, a city in south-central Spain, capital of the province of Jaén
    - Roman Catholic Diocese of Jaén, a diocese located in the city of Jaén in the ecclesiastical province of Granada
- Taifa of Jaén, a medieval kingdom in 1145 and 1168

== People ==
- Jaén (surname), a Spanish surname
- Andrés González Jaén (born 1993), Spanish footballer
- Jaime Jaen (born 1978), Panamanian baseball player
- Miguel Ángel López Jaén (born 1982), Spanish tennis player

== Grapes ==
- Jaén or Jaenes, most commonly, Cayetana blanca
- Jaén blanco, variety of Cayetana
- Jaén rosado, variety of Cayetana
- Jaén colorado, variety of Mencía, from León, Spain
- Jaen do Dão, variety of Mencía, from Portugal
- Jaén tinto (grape), from Huelva, Spain

== Other uses ==
- Jaén FS, a futsal club based in Jaén, Spain
- Real Jaén, a football club based in the city of Jaén, Spain

== See also ==
- Jaén Province (disambiguation)
- Siege of Jaén (disambiguation)
