= Garrido =

Garrido may refer to:

- Cayetana blanca, a wine grape also known as Garrido
- Garrido (surname), a Spanish surname
- Garrido's Hutia, a critically endangered species that is found in the Greater Antillean moist forests Global 200 ecoregion
- Garrido (Mexico City Metrobús), a BRT station in Mexico City

== See also ==
- Garrido Fino, another wine grape
- Garridos, a football club from Cape Verde
