= Seville (Congress of Deputies constituency) =

Electoral constituency in Spain

Coordinates: 37°30′N 5°30′W

- Congress of Deputies; Electoral constituency
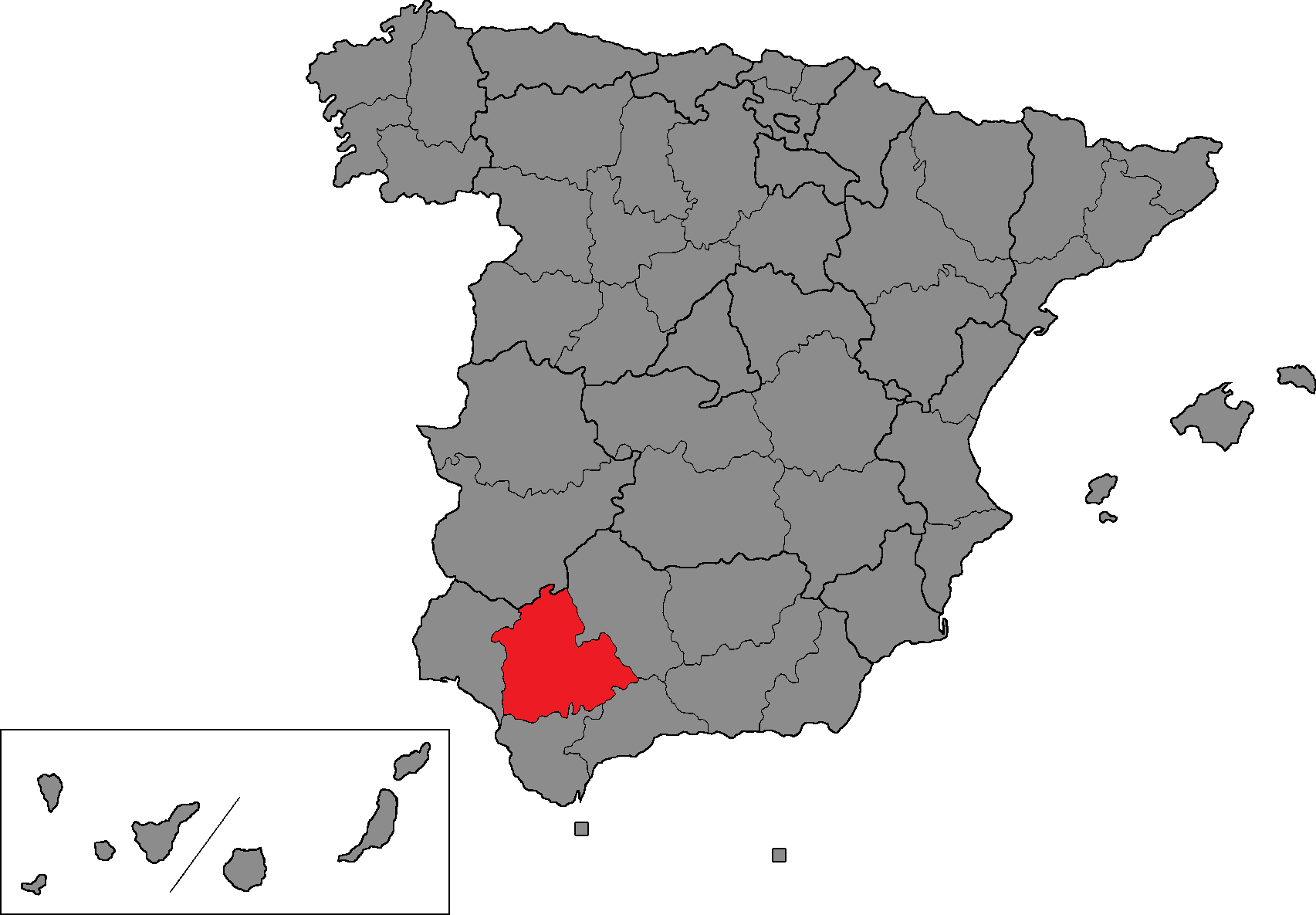
- Location of Seville within Spain
- Province: Seville
- Autonomous community: Andalusia
- Population: ▲1,967,746 (2024)
- Electorate: ▲1,564,082 (2023)
- Major settlements: Seville, Dos Hermanas, Alcalá de Guadaíra, Utrera, Écija

Current constituency
- Created: 1977
- Seats: 12 (1977–1996); 13 (1996–2004); 12 (2004–present)
- Members: PSOE (5); PP (4); Sumar (2); Vox (1)

Seville (Spanish: Sevilla) is one of the 52 constituencies represented in the Congress of Deputies, the lower chamber of the Spanish parliament, the Cortes Generales. The constituency (whose boundaries correspond to those of the homonymous province) currently elects 12 deputies. The electoral system uses the D'Hondt method and closed-list proportional voting, with a minimum threshold of three percent.

== Electoral system ==
The constituency was created as per the Political Reform Law and was first contested in the 1977 general election. The Law provided for the provinces of Spain to be established as multi-member districts in the Congress of Deputies, with this regulation being maintained under the Spanish Constitution of 1978. Additionally, the Constitution requires for any modification of the provincial limits to be approved under an organic law, needing an absolute majority in the Cortes Generales.

Voting is based on universal suffrage, comprising all Spanish nationals over 18 years of age with full political rights, provided that they have not been deprived of the right to vote by a final sentence. The only exception was in 1977, when this was limited to nationals over 21 years of age and in full enjoyment of their political and civil rights. Amendments in 2011 required non-resident citizens to apply for voting, a system known as "begged" voting (Spanish: Voto rogado). which was abolished in 2022. Further, amendments in 2018 granted the right to vote to those legally incapacitated. The Congress of Deputies has a minimum of 300 and a maximum of 400 seats, with electoral provisions fixing its size at 350. Of these, 348 are elected in 50 multi-member constituencies corresponding to the provinces of Spain—each of which is assigned an initial minimum of two seats and the remaining 248 distributed in proportion to population—using the D'Hondt method and closed-list proportional voting, with a three percent-threshold of valid votes (including blank ballots) in each constituency. The remaining two seats are allocated to Ceuta and Melilla as single-member districts elected by plurality voting. The use of this electoral method may result in a higher effective threshold depending on district magnitude and vote distribution. The law does not provide for by-elections to fill vacant seats; instead, any vacancies arising after the proclamation of candidates and during the legislative term are filled by the next candidates on the party lists or, when required, by designated substitutes.

The electoral law allows for parties and federations registered in the interior ministry, alliances and groupings of electors to present lists of candidates. Parties and federations intending to form an alliance are required to inform the relevant electoral commission within 10 days of the election call—15 before 1985—whereas groupings of electors need to secure the signature of at least one percent of the electorate in the constituencies for which they seek election—one permille of the electorate, with a compulsory minimum of 500 signatures, until 1985—disallowing electors from signing for more than one list. Also since 2011, parties, federations or alliances that have not obtained a mandate in either chamber of the Cortes at the preceding election are required to secure the signature of at least 0.1 percent of electors in the aforementioned constituencies. Amendments in 2007 required a balanced composition of men and women in the electoral lists, so that candidates of either sex made up at least 40 percent of the total composition; further amendments in 2024 required the use of a zipper system.

== Deputies ==
Deputies 1977–present
Key to parties PCE IU IULV–CA Unidas Podemos Podemos Sumar PA PSOE Cs UCD PP CP AP Vox
Legislature	Election	Distribution
Constituent	1977	2 / 5 / 5
1st	1979	2 / 2 / 4 / 4
2nd	1982	1 / 8 / 3
3rd	1986	1 / 8 / 3
4th	1989	1 / 1 / 8 / 2
5th	1993	1 / 8 / 3
6th	1996	2 / 7 / 4
7th	2000	1 / 7 / 5
8th	2004	8 / 4
9th	2008	8 / 4
10th	2011	1 / 6 / 5
11th	2015	2 / 5 / 2 / 3
12th	2016	3 / 4 / 1 / 4
13th	2019 (Apr)	2 / 5 / 2 / 2 / 1
14th	2019 (Nov)	2 / 5 / 1 / 2 / 2
15th	2023	2 / 5 / 4 / 1

== General elections ==
=== 2026 ===
Summary of the 29 November 2026 Congress of Deputies election results in Seville
Parties and alliances	Popular vote			Seats	
Parties and alliances	Votes	%	±pp	Total	+/−
Spanish Socialist Workers' Party (PSOE)					
People's Party (PP)					
Andalusian Broad Front (FA)^{1}			n/a		
We Can (Podemos)^{1}			n/a		
Vox (Vox)					
Animalist Party with the Environment (PACMA)					
Workers' Front (FO)					
For a Fairer World (M+J)					
Communist Party of the Workers of Spain (PCTE)					
Forward Andalusia (Adelante Andalucía)			New		
The Party is Over (SALF)			New		
Blank ballots					
Total				12	±0
Valid votes					
Invalid votes					
Votes cast / turnout					
Abstentions					
Registered voters	1,606,972				
Sources
Footnotes: ^{1} Within the Unite Andalusia alliance in the 2023 election.

=== 2023 ===
Summary of the 23 July 2023 Congress of Deputies election results in Seville
Parties and alliances	Popular vote			Seats	
Parties and alliances	Votes	%	±pp	Total	+/−
Spanish Socialist Workers' Party (PSOE)	387,760	36.60	+0.49	5	±0
People's Party (PP)	353,663	33.38	+15.52	4	+2
Unite Andalusia (Sumar)^{1}	148,745	14.04	–2.65	2	±0
Vox (Vox)	141,087	13.32	–4.60	1	–1
Animalist Party with the Environment (PACMA)^{2}	9,288	0.88	–0.26	0	±0
Workers' Front (FO)	1,950	0.18	New	0	±0
For a Fairer World (PUM+J)	1,765	0.17	+0.04	0	±0
Communist Party of the Workers of Spain (PCTE)	1,522	0.14	+0.09	0	±0
Zero Cuts (Recortes Cero)	1,034	0.10	–0.04	0	±0
Walking Together (CJ)	912	0.09	New	0	±0
Spanish Phalanx of the CNSO (FE de las JONS)	681	0.06	New	0	±0
Citizens–Party of the Citizenry (Cs)	n/a	n/a	–7.93	0	–1
Blank ballots	10,951	1.03	–0.28		
Total	1,059,358			12	±0
Valid votes	1,059,358	98.53	+0.18		
Invalid votes	15,775	1.47	–0.18		
Votes cast / turnout	1,075,133	68.74	–0.47		
Abstentions	488,949	31.26	+0.47		
Registered voters	1,564,082				
Sources
Footnotes: ^{1} Unite Andalusia results are compared to the combined totals of United We Can and More Country–Andalusia in the November 2019 election.; ^{2} Animalist Party with the Environment results are compared to Animalist Party Against Mistreatment of Animals totals in the November 2019 election.

=== November 2019 ===
Summary of the 10 November 2019 Congress of Deputies election results in Seville
Parties and alliances	Popular vote			Seats	
Parties and alliances	Votes	%	±pp	Total	+/−
Spanish Socialist Workers' Party (PSOE)	380,385	36.11	–1.00	5	±0
Vox (Vox)	188,813	17.92	+5.72	2	+1
People's Party (PP)	188,166	17.86	+3.35	2	±0
United We Can (Podemos–IULV–CA)	153,435	14.56	–1.43	2	±0
Citizens–Party of the Citizenry (Cs)	83,575	7.93	–8.75	1	–1
More Country–Andalusia (Más País–Andalucía)	22,388	2.13	New	0	±0
Animalist Party Against Mistreatment of Animals (PACMA)	12,035	1.14	–0.20	0	±0
Andalusia by Herself (AxSí)	5,183	0.49	+0.20	0	±0
Spanish Communist Workers' Party (PCOE)	1,495	0.14	+0.02	0	±0
Zero Cuts–Green Group (Recortes Cero–GV)	1,456	0.14	±0.00	0	±0
For a Fairer World (PUM+J)	1,402	0.13	–0.01	0	±0
Communist Party of the Andalusian People (PCPA)	842	0.08	+0.01	0	±0
Communist Party of the Workers of Spain (PCTE)	550	0.05	–0.02	0	±0
Blank ballots	13,793	1.31	+0.30		
Total	1,053,518			12	±0
Valid votes	1,053,518	98.35	–0.24		
Invalid votes	17,729	1.65	+0.24		
Votes cast / turnout	1,071,247	69.21	–4.52		
Abstentions	476,497	30.79	+4.52		
Registered voters	1,547,744				

=== April 2019 ===
Summary of the 28 April 2019 Congress of Deputies election results in Seville
Parties and alliances	Popular vote			Seats	
Parties and alliances	Votes	%	±pp	Total	+/−
Spanish Socialist Workers' Party (PSOE)	416,543	37.11	+3.48	5	+1
Citizens–Party of the Citizenry (Cs)	187,243	16.68	+3.31	2	+1
United We Can (Podemos–IULV–CA–Equo)	179,497	15.99	–4.79	2	–1
People's Party (PP)	162,891	14.51	–14.52	2	–2
Vox (Vox)	136,949	12.20	+11.99	1	+1
Animalist Party Against Mistreatment of Animals (PACMA)	15,073	1.34	+0.04	0	±0
Act (PACT)	3,567	0.32	New	0	±0
Andalusia by Herself (AxSí)	3,288	0.29	New	0	±0
Zero Cuts–Green Group (Recortes Cero–GV)	1,592	0.14	–0.05	0	±0
For a Fairer World (PUM+J)	1,527	0.14	New	0	±0
Spanish Communist Workers' Party (PCOE)	1,317	0.12	+0.02	0	±0
Communist Party of the Workers of Spain (PCTE)	830	0.07	New	0	±0
Communist Party of the Andalusian People (PCPA)	799	0.07	–0.06	0	±0
Blank ballots	11,391	1.01	+0.08		
Total	1,122,507			12	±0
Valid votes	1,122,507	98.59	–0.29		
Invalid votes	16,056	1.41	+0.29		
Votes cast / turnout	1,138,563	73.73	+5.52		
Abstentions	405,617	26.27	–5.52		
Registered voters	1,544,180				

=== 2016 ===
Summary of the 26 June 2016 Congress of Deputies election results in Seville
Parties and alliances	Popular vote			Seats	
Parties and alliances	Votes	%	±pp	Total	+/−
Spanish Socialist Workers' Party (PSOE)	347,470	33.63	–0.29	4	–1
People's Party (PP)	299,884	29.03	+3.85	4	+1
United We Can for Andalusia (Podemos–IU–Equo)^{1}	214,663	20.78	–3.97	3	+1
Citizens–Party of the Citizenry (C's)	138,086	13.37	+0.34	1	–1
Animalist Party Against Mistreatment of Animals (PACMA)	13,389	1.30	+0.39	0	±0
Union, Progress and Democracy (UPyD)	9,932	0.23	–0.29	0	±0
Vox (Vox)	8,341	0.20	±0.00	0	±0
Zero Cuts–Green Group (Recortes Cero–GV)	7,317	0.17	+0.04	0	±0
Communist Party of the Peoples of Spain (PCPE)	5,482	0.13	+0.01	0	±0
Spanish Phalanx of the CNSO (FE de las JONS)	1,980	0.05	+0.01	0	±0
We Are Andalusians Party, For Andalusia and the Peoples (AND)	1,727	0.04	New	0	±0
Spanish Communist Workers' Party (PCOE)	1,696	0.04	±0.00	0	±0
Blank Seats (EB)	961	0.02	+0.01	0	±0
United Free Citizens (CILUS)	830	0.02	–0.01	0	±0
Revolutionary Anticapitalist Left (IZAR)	687	0.02	New	0	±0
Libertarian Party (P–LIB)	393	0.01	–0.02	0	±0
Blank ballots	9,582	0.93	+0.02		
Total	1,033,112			12	±0
Valid votes	1,033,112	98.88	–0.11		
Invalid votes	11,739	1.12	+0.11		
Votes cast / turnout	1,044,851	68.21	–3.97		
Abstentions	486,955	31.79	+3.97		
Registered voters	1,531,806				
Sources
Footnotes: ^{1} United We Can results are compared to the combined totals of We Can and United Left/Greens–Assembly for Andalusia–Popular Unity in Common in the 2015 election.

=== 2015 ===
Summary of the 20 December 2015 Congress of Deputies election results in Seville
Parties and alliances	Popular vote			Seats	
Parties and alliances	Votes	%	±pp	Total	+/−
Spanish Socialist Workers' Party (PSOE)	371,142	33.92	–7.80	5	–1
People's Party (PP)	275,463	25.18	–13.50	3	–2
We Can (Podemos)	208,408	19.05	New	2	+2
Citizens–Party of the Citizenry (C's)	142,574	13.03	New	2	+2
United Left/Greens–Assembly for Andalusia–Popular Unity (IULV–CA–UPeC)	62,309	5.70	–2.93	0	–1
Animalist Party Against Mistreatment of Animals (PACMA)	9,976	0.91	New	0	±0
Union, Progress and Democracy (UPyD)	6,421	0.59	–4.93	0	±0
Vox (Vox)	2,717	0.25	New	0	±0
Zero Cuts–Green Group (Recortes Cero–GV)	1,413	0.13	New	0	±0
Spanish Communist Workers' Party (PCOE)	1,096	0.10	New	0	±0
Spanish Phalanx of the CNSO (FE de las JONS)	989	0.09	–0.02	0	±0
Communist Party of the Peoples of Spain (PCPE)	893	0.08	–0.02	0	±0
Libertarian Party (P–LIB)	652	0.06	New	0	±0
Blank ballots	9,968	0.91	–0.37		
Total	1,094,021			12	±0
Valid votes	1,094,021	98.99	+0.15		
Invalid votes	11,217	1.01	–0.15		
Votes cast / turnout	1,105,238	72.18	+0.96		
Abstentions	425,923	27.82	–0.96		
Registered voters	1,531,161				

=== 2011 ===
Summary of the 20 November 2011 Congress of Deputies election results in Seville
Parties and alliances	Popular vote			Seats	
Parties and alliances	Votes	%	±pp	Total	+/−
Spanish Socialist Workers' Party (PSOE)	442,267	41.72	–16.37	6	–2
People's Party (PP)	410,046	38.68	+7.19	5	+1
United Left/The Greens–Assembly for Andalusia: Plural Left (IULV–CA)	91,519	8.63	+3.24	1	+1
Union, Progress and Democracy (UPyD)	58,502	5.52	+4.27	0	±0
Andalusian Party (PA)^{1}	23,302	2.20	+0.51	0	±0
Equo (Equo)	11,313	1.07	New	0	±0
Blank Seats (EB)	2,966	0.28	New	0	±0
For a Fairer World (PUM+J)	1,415	0.13	+0.06	0	±0
Anti-capitalists (Anticapitalistas)	1,194	0.11	New	0	±0
Spanish Phalanx of the CNSO (FE de las JONS)	1,160	0.11	+0.07	0	±0
Communist Party of the Peoples of Spain (PCPE)	1,077	0.10	+0.05	0	±0
Humanist Party (PH)	900	0.08	+0.04	0	±0
Internationalist Solidarity and Self-Management (SAIn)	593	0.06	±0.00	0	±0
Communist Unification of Spain (UCE)	332	0.03	New	0	±0
Blank ballots	13,596	1.28	+0.17		
Total	1,060,182			12	±0
Valid votes	1,060,182	98.84	–0.59		
Invalid votes	12,464	1.16	+0.59		
Votes cast / turnout	1,072,646	71.22	–2.62		
Abstentions	433,483	28.78	+2.62		
Registered voters	1,506,129				
Sources
Footnotes: ^{1} Andalusian Party results are compared to Andalusian Coalition totals in the 2008 election.

=== 2008 ===
Summary of the 9 March 2008 Congress of Deputies election results in Seville
Parties and alliances	Popular vote			Seats	
Parties and alliances	Votes	%	±pp	Total	+/−
Spanish Socialist Workers' Party (PSOE)	626,558	58.09	–0.18	8	±0
People's Party (PP)	339,644	31.49	+3.56	4	±0
United Left/The Greens–Assembly for Andalusia–Alternative (IULV–CA)	58,091	5.39	–1.29	0	±0
Andalusian Coalition (CA)^{1}	18,206	1.69	–2.81	0	±0
Union, Progress and Democracy (UPyD)	13,467	1.25	New	0	±0
The Greens (Verdes)	3,065	0.28	New	0	±0
Anti-Bullfighting Party Against Mistreatment of Animals (PACMA)	1,517	0.14	New	0	±0
Internationalist Socialist Workers' Party (POSI)	1,058	0.10	New	0	±0
For a Fairer World (PUM+J)	807	0.07	New	0	±0
Citizens–Party of the Citizenry (C's)	682	0.06	New	0	±0
Internationalist Solidarity and Self-Management (SAIn)	612	0.06	New	0	±0
Communist Party of the Peoples of Spain (PCPE)	533	0.05	+0.05	0	±0
Spanish Phalanx of the CNSO (FE de las JONS)	414	0.04	–0.01	0	±0
Humanist Party (PH)	393	0.04	–0.04	0	±0
Family and Life Party (PFyV)	365	0.03	–0.05	0	±0
Engine and Sports Alternative (AMD)	356	0.03	New	0	±0
Spanish Alternative (AES)	287	0.03	New	0	±0
National Democracy (DN)	279	0.03	–0.01	0	±0
Authentic Phalanx (FA)	189	0.02	New	0	±0
Blank ballots	12,019	1.11	–0.71		
Total	1,078,542			12	±0
Valid votes	1,078,542	99.43	+0.03		
Invalid votes	6,170	0.57	–0.03		
Votes cast / turnout	1,084,712	73.84	–3.24		
Abstentions	384,364	26.16	+3.24		
Registered voters	1,469,076				
Sources
Footnotes: ^{1} Andalusian Coalition results are compared to the combined totals of Andalusian Party and Socialist Party of Andalusia in the 2004 election.

=== 2004 ===
Summary of the 14 March 2004 Congress of Deputies election results in Seville
Parties and alliances	Popular vote			Seats	
Parties and alliances	Votes	%	±pp	Total	+/−
Spanish Socialist Workers' Party (PSOE)	639,293	58.27	+9.25	8	+1
People's Party (PP)	306,464	27.93	–7.05	4	–1
United Left/The Greens–Assembly for Andalusia (IULV–CA)	73,344	6.68	–1.60	0	–1
Andalusian Party (PA)	45,005	4.10	–0.98	0	±0
Socialist Party of Andalusia (PSA)	4,415	0.40	New	0	±0
Citizens for Blank Votes (CenB)	2,237	0.20	New	0	±0
Republican Left (IR)	1,111	0.10	New	0	±0
Family and Life Party (PFyV)	865	0.08	New	0	±0
Humanist Party (PH)	858	0.08	+0.02	0	±0
Democratic and Social Centre (CDS)	700	0.06	+0.02	0	±0
Andalusia Assembly (A)	655	0.06	+0.02	0	±0
Spanish Phalanx of the CNSO (FE de las JONS)^{1}	591	0.05	+0.03	0	±0
Andalusian Social Democratic Party (PSDA)	583	0.05	New	0	±0
The Phalanx (FE)	394	0.04	–0.06	0	±0
National Democracy (DN)	389	0.04	New	0	±0
Republican Social Movement (MSR)	292	0.03	New	0	±0
Communist Party of the Peoples of Spain (PCPE)	0	0.00	–0.08	0	±0
Blank ballots	19,960	1.82	+0.10		
Total	1,097,156			12	–1
Valid votes	1,097,156	99.40	+0.02		
Invalid votes	6,602	0.60	–0.02		
Votes cast / turnout	1,103,758	77.08	+7.34		
Abstentions	328,273	22.92	–7.34		
Registered voters	1,432,031				
Sources
Footnotes: ^{1} Spanish Phalanx of the CNSO results are compared to Independent Spanish Phalanx–Phalanx 2000 totals in the 2000 election.

=== 2000 ===
Summary of the 12 March 2000 Congress of Deputies election results in Seville
Parties and alliances	Popular vote			Seats	
Parties and alliances	Votes	%	±pp	Total	+/−
Spanish Socialist Workers' Party–Progressives (PSOE–p)	476,277	49.02	–1.03	7	±0
People's Party (PP)	339,879	34.98	+3.56	5	+1
United Left/The Greens–Assembly for Andalusia (IULV–CA)	80,455	8.28	–5.13	1	–1
Andalusian Party (PA)	49,342	5.08	+1.55	0	±0
Andalusian Left (IA)	1,431	0.15	New	0	±0
The Phalanx (FE)	939	0.10	New	0	±0
Internationalist Socialist Workers' Party (POSI)	921	0.09	New	0	±0
Liberal Independent Group (GIL)	871	0.09	New	0	±0
Communist Party of the Peoples of Spain (PCPE)	762	0.08	–0.03	0	±0
Humanist Party (PH)	607	0.06	+0.01	0	±0
Andalusian Nation (NA)	511	0.05	±0.00	0	±0
Voice of the Andalusian People (VDPA)	493	0.05	±0.00	0	±0
Natural Law Party (PLN)	489	0.05	New	0	±0
Andalusia Assembly (A)	368	0.04	New	0	±0
Centrist Union–Democratic and Social Centre (UC–CDS)	364	0.04	–0.01	0	±0
Republican Action (AR)	303	0.03	New	0	±0
Spain 2000 Platform (ES2000)	283	0.03	New	0	±0
Spanish Democratic Party (PADE)	240	0.02	New	0	±0
Independent Spanish Phalanx–Phalanx 2000 (FEI–FE 2000)	238	0.02	–0.01	0	±0
Blank ballots	16,727	1.72	+0.68		
Total	971,500			13	±0
Valid votes	971,500	99.38	–0.11		
Invalid votes	6,012	0.62	+0.11		
Votes cast / turnout	977,512	69.74	–9.95		
Abstentions	424,070	30.26	+9.95		
Registered voters	1,401,582				

=== 1996 ===
Summary of the 3 March 1996 Congress of Deputies election results in Seville
Parties and alliances	Popular vote			Seats	
Parties and alliances	Votes	%	±pp	Total	+/−
Spanish Socialist Workers' Party of Andalusia (PSOE–A)	521,484	50.05	–5.98	7	–1
People's Party (PP)	327,384	31.42	+5.42	4	+1
United Left/The Greens–Assembly for Andalusia (IULV–CA)	139,733	13.41	+1.73	2	+1
Andalusian Party (PA)^{1}	36,797	3.53	–0.01	0	±0
Communist Party of the Andalusian People (PCPA)	1,162	0.11	–0.07	0	±0
Workers' Revolutionary Party (PRT)^{2}	1,117	0.11	–0.07	0	±0
Authentic Spanish Phalanx (FEA)	616	0.06	New	0	±0
Voice of the Andalusian People (VDPA)	529	0.05	New	0	±0
Humanist Party (PH)	515	0.05	+0.02	0	±0
Andalusian Nation (NA)	500	0.05	New	0	±0
Centrist Union (UC)	478	0.05	–0.53	0	±0
Alliance for National Unity (AUN)	351	0.03	New	0	±0
Independent Spanish Phalanx (FEI)	346	0.03	+0.01	0	±0
Blank ballots	10,812	1.04	+0.41		
Total	1,041,824			13	+1
Valid votes	1,041,824	99.49	–0.10		
Invalid votes	5,348	0.51	+0.10		
Votes cast / turnout	1,047,172	79.69	+0.72		
Abstentions	266,826	20.31	–0.72		
Registered voters	1,313,998				
Sources
Footnotes: ^{1} Andalusian Party results are compared to the combined totals of Andalusian Party and Andalusian Progress Party in the 1993 election.; ^{2} Workers' Revolutionary Party results are compared to Workers' Socialist Party totals in the 1993 election.

=== 1993 ===
Summary of the 6 June 1993 Congress of Deputies election results in Seville
Parties and alliances	Popular vote			Seats	
Parties and alliances	Votes	%	±pp	Total	+/−
Spanish Socialist Workers' Party of Andalusia (PSOE–A)	543,651	56.03	+1.88	8	±0
People's Party (PP)	252,241	26.00	+7.00	3	+1
United Left–Assembly for Andalusia (IU–CA)	113,316	11.68	+0.19	1	±0
Andalusian Party (PA)	30,421	3.14	–5.88	0	–1
Democratic and Social Centre (CDS)	5,597	0.58	–1.69	0	±0
The Greens of Andalusia (Verdes)^{1}	5,507	0.57	–0.03	0	±0
Andalusian Progress Party (PAP)	3,884	0.40	New	0	±0
The Ecologists (LE)	2,506	0.26	–0.05	0	±0
Communist Party of the Andalusian People (PCPA)	1,718	0.18	–0.04	0	±0
Workers' Socialist Party (PST)	1,713	0.18	–0.05	0	±0
Ruiz-Mateos Group–European Democratic Alliance (ARM–ADE)	1,090	0.11	–0.90	0	±0
Liberal Independent Group (GIL)	775	0.08	New	0	±0
Natural Law Party (PLN)	608	0.06	New	0	±0
Spanish Phalanx of the CNSO (FE–JONS)	440	0.05	–0.05	0	±0
Coalition for a New Socialist Party (CNPS)^{2}	270	0.03	–0.02	0	±0
Humanist Party (PH)	255	0.03	–0.03	0	±0
Independent Spanish Phalanx (FEI)	203	0.02	New	0	±0
Communist Unification of Spain (UCE)	0	0.00	New	0	±0
Blank ballots	6,106	0.63	+0.13		
Total	970,301			12	±0
Valid votes	970,301	99.59	+0.39		
Invalid votes	3,993	0.41	–0.39		
Votes cast / turnout	974,294	78.97	+7.49		
Abstentions	259,384	21.03	–7.49		
Registered voters	1,233,678				
Sources
Footnotes: ^{1} The Greens of Andalusia results are compared to The Greens–Green List totals in the 1989 election.; ^{2} Coalition for a New Socialist Party results are compared to Alliance for the Republic totals in the 1989 election.

=== 1989 ===
Summary of the 29 October 1989 Congress of Deputies election results in Seville
Parties and alliances	Popular vote			Seats	
Parties and alliances	Votes	%	±pp	Total	+/−
Spanish Socialist Workers' Party of Andalusia (PSOE–A)	438,615	54.15	–5.05	8	±0
People's Party (PP)^{1}	153,905	19.00	–2.17	2	–1
United Left–Assembly for Andalusia (IU–CA)	93,080	11.49	+3.24	1	±0
Andalusian Party (PA)	73,031	9.02	+4.96	1	+1
Democratic and Social Centre (CDS)	18,420	2.27	–1.36	0	±0
Ruiz-Mateos Group (Ruiz-Mateos)	8,163	1.01	New	0	±0
Workers' Party of Spain–Communist Unity (PTE–UC)^{2}	6,277	0.77	–0.61	0	±0
The Greens–Green List (LV–LV)	4,823	0.60	New	0	±0
The Ecologist Greens (LVE)	2,474	0.31	New	0	±0
Workers' Socialist Party (PST)	1,830	0.23	–0.09	0	±0
Communist Party of the Andalusian People (PCPA)	1,760	0.22	New	0	±0
Spanish Vertex Ecological Development Revindication (VERDE)	1,436	0.18	+0.03	0	±0
Spanish Phalanx of the CNSO (FE–JONS)	798	0.10	–0.02	0	±0
Humanist Party (PH)	484	0.06	New	0	±0
Alliance for the Republic (AxR)^{3}	391	0.05	±0.00	0	±0
Proverist Party (PPr)	245	0.03	New	0	±0
Centrist Unity–Democratic Spanish Party (PED)	185	0.02	New	0	±0
Communist Party of Spain (Marxist–Leninist) (PCE (m–l))^{4}	0	0.00	–0.06	0	±0
Blank ballots	4,083	0.50	+0.12		
Total	810,000			12	±0
Valid votes	810,000	99.20	+0.48		
Invalid votes	6,518	0.80	–0.48		
Votes cast / turnout	816,518	71.48	–2.12		
Abstentions	325,772	28.52	+2.12		
Registered voters	1,142,290				
Sources
Footnotes: ^{1} People's Party results are compared to People's Coalition totals in the 1986 election.; ^{2} Workers' Party of Spain–Communist Unity results are compared to Communists' Unity Board totals in the 1986 election.; ^{3} Alliance for the Republic results are compared to Internationalist Socialist Workers' Party totals in the 1986 election.; ^{4} Communist Party of Spain (Marxist–Leninist) results are compared to Republican Popular Unity totals in the 1986 election.

=== 1986 ===
Summary of the 22 June 1986 Congress of Deputies election results in Seville
Parties and alliances	Popular vote			Seats	
Parties and alliances	Votes	%	±pp	Total	+/−
Spanish Socialist Workers' Party (PSOE)	473,743	59.20	–2.79	8	±0
People's Coalition (AP–PDP–PL)^{1}	169,409	21.17	–0.81	3	±0
United Left (IU)^{2}	66,034	8.25	+1.10	1	±0
Andalusian Party (PA)	32,515	4.06	+1.14	0	±0
Democratic and Social Centre (CDS)	29,033	3.63	+2.91	0	±0
Communists' Unity Board (MUC)	11,020	1.38	New	0	±0
Democratic Reformist Party (PRD)	4,428	0.55	New	0	±0
Workers' Socialist Party (PST)	2,565	0.32	–0.17	0	±0
Green Alternative List (LAV)	2,224	0.28	New	0	±0
Socialist Party of the Andalusian People (PSPA)	1,760	0.22	New	0	±0
Spanish Vertex Ecological Development Revindication (VERDE)	1,208	0.15	New	0	±0
Spanish Phalanx of the CNSO (FE–JONS)	988	0.12	+0.12	0	±0
Communist Unification of Spain (UCE)	841	0.11	+0.07	0	±0
Republican Popular Unity (UPR)^{3}	512	0.06	±0.00	0	±0
National Unity Coalition (CUN)	448	0.06	New	0	±0
Internationalist Socialist Workers' Party (POSI)	378	0.05	New	0	±0
Party of the Communists of Catalonia (PCC)	0	0.00	New	0	±0
Blank ballots	3,077	0.38	+0.10		
Total	800,183			12	±0
Valid votes	800,183	98.72	+0.24		
Invalid votes	10,407	1.28	–0.24		
Votes cast / turnout	810,590	73.60	–7.56		
Abstentions	290,792	26.40	+7.56		
Registered voters	1,101,382				
Sources
Footnotes: ^{1} People's Coalition results are compared to People's Alliance–People's Democratic Party totals in the 1982 election.; ^{2} United Left results are compared to Communist Party of Andalusia totals in the 1982 election.; ^{3} Republican Popular Unity results are compared to Communist Party of Spain (Marxist–Leninist) totals in the 1982 election.

=== 1982 ===
Summary of the 28 October 1982 Congress of Deputies election results in Seville
Parties and alliances	Popular vote			Seats	
Parties and alliances	Votes	%	±pp	Total	+/−
Spanish Socialist Workers' Party of Andalusia (PSA–PSOE)	496,543	61.99	+32.59	8	+4
People's Alliance–People's Democratic Party (AP–PDP)^{1}	176,054	21.98	+17.29	3	+3
Communist Party of Andalusia (PCA–PCE)	57,272	7.15	–8.85	1	–1
Union of the Democratic Centre (UCD)	30,004	3.75	–23.86	0	–4
Socialist Party of Andalusia–Andalusian Party (PSA–PA)	23,375	2.92	–11.76	0	–2
Democratic and Social Centre (CDS)	5,775	0.72	New	0	±0
Workers' Socialist Party (PST)	2,568	0.32	New	0	±0
New Force (FN)^{2}	2,227	0.28	–1.05	0	±0
Spanish Communist Workers' Party (PCOE)	2,017	0.25	New	0	±0
Spanish Solidarity (SE)	718	0.09	New	0	±0
Communist League–Internationalist Socialist Workers' Coalition (LC (COSI))	599	0.07	New	0	±0
Communist Party of Spain (Marxist–Leninist) (PCE (m–l))	520	0.06	New	0	±0
Falangist Movement of Spain (MFE)	376	0.05	New	0	±0
Independent Spanish Phalanx (FEI)	341	0.04	New	0	±0
Communist Unification of Spain (UCE)	335	0.04	–0.28	0	±0
Socialist Party (PS)^{3}	0	0.00	–0.54	0	±0
Communist Movement of Andalusia (MCA)	0	0.00	–0.15	0	±0
Revolutionary Communist League (LCR)	0	0.00	–0.11	0	±0
Spanish Phalanx of the CNSO (FE–JONS)	0	0.00	New	0	±0
Blank ballots	2,271	0.28	+0.13		
Total	800,995			12	±0
Valid votes	800,995	98.48	–0.56		
Invalid votes	12,322	1.52	+0.56		
Votes cast / turnout	813,317	81.16	+9.76		
Abstentions	188,753	18.84	–9.76		
Registered voters	1,002,070				
Sources
Footnotes: ^{1} People's Alliance–People's Democratic Party results are compared to Democratic Coalition totals in the 1979 election.; ^{2} New Force results are compared to National Union totals in the 1979 election.; ^{3} Socialist Party results are compared to Spanish Socialist Workers' Party (historical) totals in the 1979 election.

=== 1979 ===
Summary of the 1 March 1979 Congress of Deputies election results in Seville
Parties and alliances	Popular vote			Seats	
Parties and alliances	Votes	%	±pp	Total	+/−
Spanish Socialist Workers' Party (PSOE)^{1}	203,468	29.40	–12.19	4	–1
Union of the Democratic Centre (UCD)	191,099	27.61	–5.01	4	–1
Communist Party of Spain (PCE)	110,731	16.00	+2.57	2	±0
Socialist Party of Andalusia–Andalusian Party (PSA–PA)	101,601	14.68	New	2	+2
Democratic Coalition (CD)^{2}	32,428	4.69	–1.57	0	±0
Party of Labour of Spain (PTE)^{3}	27,337	3.95	+1.17	0	±0
National Union (UN)^{4}	9,225	1.33	+1.01	0	±0
Spanish Socialist Workers' Party (historical) (PSOEh)^{5}	3,706	0.54	–0.05	0	±0
Communist Unification of Spain (UCE)	2,226	0.32	New	0	±0
Communist Organization of Spain (Red Flag) (OCE–BR)	2,045	0.30	New	0	±0
Workers' Communist Party (PCT)	1,134	0.16	New	0	±0
Workers' Revolutionary Organization (ORT)^{6}	1,086	0.16	–0.09	0	±0
Communist Movement–Organization of Communist Left (MC–OIC)	1,031	0.15	New	0	±0
Spanish Phalanx of the CNSO (Authentic) (FE–JONS(A))	1,029	0.15	New	0	±0
Workers and Peasants Party (POC)	986	0.14	New	0	±0
Revolutionary Communist League (LCR)^{7}	774	0.11	+0.11	0	±0
Republican Left (IR)	741	0.11	New	0	±0
Proverist Party (PPr)	443	0.06	New	0	±0
Blank ballots	1,051	0.15	–0.15		
Total	692,141			12	±0
Valid votes	692,141	99.04	+0.27		
Invalid votes	6,677	0.96	–0.27		
Votes cast / turnout	698,818	71.40	–10.89		
Abstentions	279,954	28.60	+10.89		
Registered voters	978,772				
Sources
Footnotes: ^{1} Spanish Socialist Workers' Party results are compared to the combined totals of Spanish Socialist Workers' Party and People's Socialist Party–Socialist Unity in the 1977 election.; ^{2} Democratic Coalition results are compared to People's Alliance totals in the 1977 election.; ^{3} Party of Labour of Spain results are compared to Democratic Left Front totals in the 1977 election.; ^{4} National Union results are compared to National Alliance July 18 totals in the 1977 election.; ^{5} Spanish Socialist Workers' Party (historical) results are compared to Democratic Socialist Alliance totals in the 1977 election.; ^{6} Workers' Revolutionary Organization results are compared to Workers' Electoral Group totals in the 1977 election.; ^{7} Revolutionary Communist League results are compared to Front for Workers' Unity totals in the 1977 election.

=== 1977 ===
Summary of the 15 June 1977 Congress of Deputies election results in Seville
Parties and alliances	Popular vote			Seats	
Parties and alliances	Votes	%	±pp	Total	+/−
Spanish Socialist Workers' Party (PSOE)	251,336	36.72	n/a	5	n/a
Union of the Democratic Centre (UCD)	223,252	32.62	n/a	5	n/a
Communist Party of Spain (PCE)	91,914	13.43	n/a	2	n/a
People's Alliance (AP)	42,860	6.26	n/a	0	n/a
People's Socialist Party–Socialist Unity (PSP–US)	33,329	4.87	n/a	0	n/a
Democratic Left Front (FDI)	19,008	2.78	n/a	0	n/a
Federation of Christian Democracy (FPD–ID)	6,523	0.95	n/a	0	n/a
Democratic Socialist Alliance (ASDCI)	4,064	0.59	n/a	0	n/a
Andalusian Regional Unity (URA)	2,663	0.39	n/a	0	n/a
National Alliance July 18 (AN18)	2,197	0.32	n/a	0	n/a
Andalusian Socialist Movement (MSA)	1,749	0.26	n/a	0	n/a
Spanish Social Reform (RSE)	1,736	0.25	n/a	0	n/a
Workers' Electoral Group (AET)	1,736	0.25	n/a	0	n/a
Front for Workers' Unity (FUT)	0	0.00	n/a	0	n/a
Left Andalusian Candidacy (CAI)	0	0.00	n/a	0	n/a
Blank ballots	2,032	0.30	n/a		
Total	684,399			12	n/a
Valid votes	684,399	98.77	n/a		
Invalid votes	8,527	1.23	n/a		
Votes cast / turnout	692,926	82.29	n/a		
Abstentions	149,116	17.71	n/a		
Registered voters	842,042				

== Bibliography ==
- Ley 1/1977, de 4 de enero, para la Reforma Política (Fundamental Law 1/1977). Official State Gazette (in Spanish). 4 January 1977. BOE-A-1977-165.
- Real Decreto-ley 20/1977, de 18 de marzo, sobre Normas Electorales (Royal Decree-Law 20/1977). Official State Gazette (in Spanish). 18 March 1977. BOE-A-1977-7445.
- Constitución Española (Constitution). Official State Gazette (in Spanish). 27 December 1978. BOE-A-1978-31229.
- Ley Orgánica 5/1985, de 19 de junio, del Régimen Electoral General (Organic Law 5/1985). Official State Gazette (in Spanish). 19 June 1985. BOE-A-1985-11672.
- Carreras de Odriozola, Albert; Tafunell Sambola, Xavier (2005) [1989]. Estadísticas históricas de España, siglos XIX-XX (PDF) (in Spanish). Vol. 1 (II ed.). Bilbao: Fundación BBVA. pp. 1072–1097. ISBN 84-96515-00-1. Archived from the original (PDF) on 24 September 2015.
