= Badajoz (Congress of Deputies constituency) =

Electoral constituency in Spain

Coordinates: 38°40′N 6°10′W

- Congress of Deputies; Electoral constituency
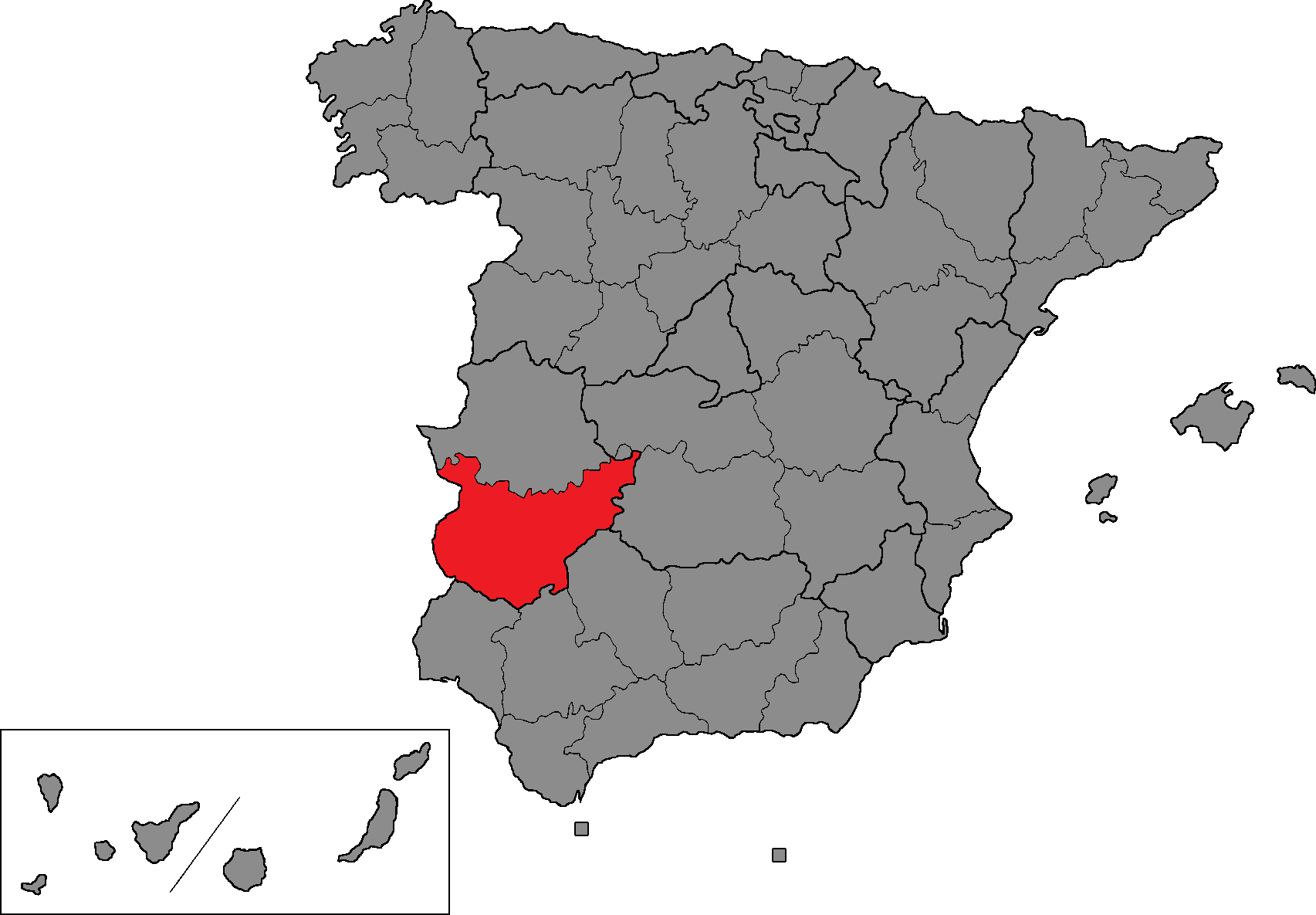
- Location of Badajoz within Spain
- Province: Badajoz
- Autonomous community: Extremadura
- Population: ▼664,970 (2024)
- Electorate: ▼550,702 (2023)
- Major settlements: Badajoz, Mérida, Don Benito, Almendralejo

Current constituency
- Created: 1977
- Seats: 7 (1977–1986); 6 (1986–2023); 5 (2023–present)
- Members: PSOE (2); PP (2); Vox (1)

Badajoz is one of the 52 constituencies represented in the Congress of Deputies, the lower chamber of the Spanish parliament, the Cortes Generales. The constituency (whose boundaries correspond to those of the homonymous province) currently elects five deputies. The electoral system uses the D'Hondt method and closed-list proportional voting, with a minimum threshold of three percent.

== Electoral system ==
The constituency was created as per the Political Reform Law and was first contested in the 1977 general election. The Law provided for the provinces of Spain to be established as multi-member districts in the Congress of Deputies, with this regulation being maintained under the Spanish Constitution of 1978. Additionally, the Constitution requires for any modification of the provincial limits to be approved under an organic law, needing an absolute majority in the Cortes Generales.

Voting is based on universal suffrage, comprising all Spanish nationals over 18 years of age with full political rights, provided that they have not been deprived of the right to vote by a final sentence. The only exception was in 1977, when this was limited to nationals over 21 years of age and in full enjoyment of their political and civil rights. Amendments in 2011 required non-resident citizens to apply for voting, a system known as "begged" voting (Spanish: Voto rogado). which was abolished in 2022. Further, amendments in 2018 granted the right to vote to those legally incapacitated. The Congress of Deputies has a minimum of 300 and a maximum of 400 seats, with electoral provisions fixing its size at 350. Of these, 348 are elected in 50 multi-member constituencies corresponding to the provinces of Spain—each of which is assigned an initial minimum of two seats and the remaining 248 distributed in proportion to population—using the D'Hondt method and closed-list proportional voting, with a three percent-threshold of valid votes (including blank ballots) in each constituency. The remaining two seats are allocated to Ceuta and Melilla as single-member districts elected by plurality voting. The use of this electoral method may result in a higher effective threshold depending on district magnitude and vote distribution. The law does not provide for by-elections to fill vacant seats; instead, any vacancies arising after the proclamation of candidates and during the legislative term are filled by the next candidates on the party lists or, when required, by designated substitutes.

The electoral law allows for parties and federations registered in the interior ministry, alliances and groupings of electors to present lists of candidates. Parties and federations intending to form an alliance are required to inform the relevant electoral commission within 10 days of the election call—15 before 1985—whereas groupings of electors need to secure the signature of at least one percent of the electorate in the constituencies for which they seek election—one permille of the electorate, with a compulsory minimum of 500 signatures, until 1985—disallowing electors from signing for more than one list. Also since 2011, parties, federations or alliances that have not obtained a mandate in either chamber of the Cortes at the preceding election are required to secure the signature of at least 0.1 percent of electors in the aforementioned constituencies. Amendments in 2007 required a balanced composition of men and women in the electoral lists, so that candidates of either sex made up at least 40 percent of the total composition; further amendments in 2024 required the use of a zipper system.

== Deputies ==
Deputies 1977–present
Key to parties U.Podemos Podemos PSOE Cs UCD PP CP AP Vox
Legislature	Election	Distribution
Constituent	1977	3 / 4
1st	1979	3 / 4
2nd	1982	5 / 2
3rd	1986	4 / 2
4th	1989	4 / 2
5th	1993	4 / 2
6th	1996	3 / 3
7th	2000	3 / 3
8th	2004	3 / 3
9th	2008	3 / 3
10th	2011	2 / 4
11th	2015	1 / 3 / 2
12th	2016	1 / 2 / 3
13th	2019 (Apr)	3 / 1 / 1 / 1
14th	2019 (Nov)	3 / 2 / 1
15th	2023	2 / 2 / 1

== General elections ==
=== 2026 ===
Summary of the 29 November 2026 Congress of Deputies election results in Badajoz
Parties and alliances	Popular vote			Seats	
Parties and alliances	Votes	%	±pp	Total	+/−
Spanish Socialist Workers' Party (PSOE)					
People's Party (PP)					
Vox (Vox)					
Broad Front (FA)^{1}			n/a		
We Can (Podemos)^{1}			n/a		
Animalist Party with the Environment (PACMA)					
Workers' Front (FO)					
For a Fairer World (M+J)					
The Party is Over (SALF)			New		
New Extremennism–Forward Extremadura (NEx)			New		
Blank ballots					
Total				5	±0
Valid votes					
Invalid votes					
Votes cast / turnout					
Abstentions					
Registered voters	552,081				
Sources
Footnotes: ^{1} Within the Unite alliance in the 2023 election.

=== 2023 ===
Summary of the 23 July 2023 Congress of Deputies election results in Badajoz
Parties and alliances	Popular vote			Seats	
Parties and alliances	Votes	%	±pp	Total	+/−
Spanish Socialist Workers' Party (PSOE)	153,473	39.21	+0.76	2	–1
People's Party (PP)	148,068	37.82	+12.77	2	±0
Vox (Vox)	53,492	13.66	–3.63	1	±0
Unite (Sumar)^{1}	26,778	6.84	–2.34	0	±0
Extremaduran Bloc (BQEx)	3,885	0.99	New	0	±0
Animalist Party with the Environment (PACMA)^{2}	1,395	0.36	–0.29	0	±0
Workers' Front (FO)	477	0.12	New	0	±0
For a Fairer World (PUM+J)	464	0.12	–0.13	0	±0
Zero Cuts (Recortes Cero)	204	0.05	–0.13	0	±0
Blank ballots	3,225	0.82	–0.15		
Total	391,461			5	–1
Valid votes	391,461	98.30	+0.10		
Invalid votes	6,772	1.70	–0.10		
Votes cast / turnout	398,233	72.31	+4.39		
Abstentions	152,469	27.69	–4.39		
Registered voters	550,702				
Sources
Footnotes: ^{1} Unite results are compared to United We Can totals in the November 2019 election.; ^{2} Animalist Party with the Environment results are compared to Animalist Party Against Mistreatment of Animals totals in the November 2019 election.

=== November 2019 ===
Summary of the 10 November 2019 Congress of Deputies election results in Badajoz
Parties and alliances	Popular vote			Seats	
Parties and alliances	Votes	%	±pp	Total	+/−
Spanish Socialist Workers' Party (PSOE)	142,312	38.45	–0.03	3	±0
People's Party (PP)	92,742	25.05	+4.66	2	+1
Vox (Vox)	64,016	17.29	+6.30	1	±0
United We Can (Podemos–IU)	33,971	9.18	–0.19	0	±0
Citizens–Party of the Citizenry (Cs)	29,520	7.97	–10.54	0	–1
Animalist Party Against Mistreatment of Animals (PACMA)	2,400	0.65	–0.07	0	±0
For a Fairer World (PUM+J)	925	0.25	+0.14	0	±0
Zero Cuts–Green Group (Recortes Cero–GV)	674	0.18	+0.07	0	±0
Blank ballots	3,599	0.97	+0.13		
Total	370,159			6	±0
Valid votes	370,159	98.20	–0.22		
Invalid votes	6,781	1.80	+0.22		
Votes cast / turnout	376,940	67.92	–6.78		
Abstentions	178,054	32.08	+6.78		
Registered voters	554,994				

=== April 2019 ===
Summary of the 28 April 2019 Congress of Deputies election results in Badajoz
Parties and alliances	Popular vote			Seats	
Parties and alliances	Votes	%	±pp	Total	+/−
Spanish Socialist Workers' Party (PSOE)	157,164	38.48	+3.19	3	+1
People's Party (PP)	83,278	20.39	–19.19	1	–2
Citizens–Party of the Citizenry (Cs)	75,583	18.51	+7.82	1	+1
Vox (Vox)	44,890	10.99	+10.83	1	+1
United We Can (Podemos–IU–Equo)	38,252	9.37	–3.11	0	–1
Animalist Party Against Mistreatment of Animals (PACMA)	2,938	0.72	–0.01	0	±0
Extremadurans (CEx–CREx–PREx)	920	0.23	New	0	±0
Act (PACT)	745	0.18	New	0	±0
Zero Cuts–Green Group (Recortes Cero–GV)	449	0.11	–0.05	0	±0
For a Fairer World (PUM+J)	442	0.11	New	0	±0
Public Defense Organization (ODP)	308	0.08	New	0	±0
Blank ballots	3,424	0.84	+0.12		
Total	408,393			6	±0
Valid votes	408,393	98.42	–0.27		
Invalid votes	6,547	1.58	+0.27		
Votes cast / turnout	414,940	74.70	+6.09		
Abstentions	140,507	25.30	–6.09		
Registered voters	555,447				

=== 2016 ===
Summary of the 26 June 2016 Congress of Deputies election results in Badajoz
Parties and alliances	Popular vote			Seats	
Parties and alliances	Votes	%	±pp	Total	+/−
People's Party (PP)	149,603	39.58	+5.11	3	+1
Spanish Socialist Workers' Party (PSOE)	133,392	35.29	–1.89	2	–1
United We Can (Podemos–IU–Equo)^{1}	47,182	12.48	–2.47	1	±0
Citizens–Party of the Citizenry (C's)	40,417	10.69	–0.67	0	±0
Animalist Party Against Mistreatment of Animals (PACMA)	2,766	0.73	+0.22	0	±0
Union, Progress and Democracy (UPyD)	639	0.17	–0.22	0	±0
Vox (Vox)	617	0.16	New	0	±0
Zero Cuts–Green Group (Recortes Cero–GV)	614	0.16	+0.03	0	±0
Blank ballots	2,719	0.72	–0.06		
Total	377,949			6	±0
Valid votes	377,949	98.69	–0.02		
Invalid votes	5,032	1.31	+0.02		
Votes cast / turnout	382,981	68.61	–3.73		
Abstentions	175,247	31.39	+3.73		
Registered voters	558,228				
Sources
Footnotes: ^{1} United We Can results are compared to the combined totals of We Can and United Left–Popular Unity in Common in the 2015 election.

=== 2015 ===
Summary of the 20 December 2015 Congress of Deputies election results in Badajoz
Parties and alliances	Popular vote			Seats	
Parties and alliances	Votes	%	±pp	Total	+/−
Spanish Socialist Workers' Party (PSOE)	148,493	37.18	–0.41	3	+1
People's Party (PP)	137,640	34.47	–16.18	2	–2
We Can (Podemos)	47,368	11.86	New	1	+1
Citizens–Party of the Citizenry (C's)	45,350	11.36	New	0	±0
United Left–Popular Unity in Common (IU–UPeC)	12,338	3.09	–2.86	0	±0
Animalist Party Against Mistreatment of Animals (PACMA)	2,041	0.51	+0.17	0	±0
Union, Progress and Democracy (UPyD)	1,546	0.39	–3.08	0	±0
United Extremadura–Extremadurans (EU–eX)^{1}	951	0.24	+0.10	0	±0
Zero Cuts–Green Group (Recortes Cero–GV)	508	0.13	New	0	±0
Blank ballots	3,117	0.78	–0.40		
Total	399,352			6	±0
Valid votes	399,352	98.71	–0.02		
Invalid votes	5,224	1.29	+0.02		
Votes cast / turnout	404,576	72.34	–1.94		
Abstentions	154,671	27.66	+1.94		
Registered voters	559,247				
Sources
Footnotes: ^{1} United Extremadura–Extremadurans results are compared to Convergence for Extremadura totals in the 2011 election.

=== 2011 ===
Summary of the 20 November 2011 Congress of Deputies election results in Badajoz
Parties and alliances	Popular vote			Seats	
Parties and alliances	Votes	%	±pp	Total	+/−
People's Party–United Extremadura (PP–EU)^{1}	207,068	50.65	+8.87	4	+1
Spanish Socialist Workers' Party (PSOE)	153,692	37.59	–14.75	2	–1
United Left–Greens–Independent Socialists: Plural Left (IU–V–SIEx)	24,344	5.95	+2.86	0	±0
Union, Progress and Democracy (UPyD)	14,174	3.47	+2.70	0	±0
Equo (Equo)	1,801	0.44	New	0	±0
Animalist Party Against Mistreatment of Animals (PACMA)	1,371	0.34	+0.23	0	±0
For a Fairer World (PUM+J)	986	0.24	+0.07	0	±0
Convergence for Extremadura (CEx)	574	0.14	New	0	±0
Blank ballots	4,832	1.18	+0.34		
Total	408,842			6	±0
Valid votes	408,842	98.73	–0.63		
Invalid votes	5,260	1.27	+0.63		
Votes cast / turnout	414,102	74.28	–4.32		
Abstentions	143,366	25.72	+4.32		
Registered voters	557,468				
Sources
Footnotes: ^{1} People's Party–United Extremadura results are compared to the combined totals of the People's Party and United Extremadura in the 2008 election.

=== 2008 ===
Summary of the 9 March 2008 Congress of Deputies election results in Badajoz
Parties and alliances	Popular vote			Seats	
Parties and alliances	Votes	%	±pp	Total	+/−
Spanish Socialist Workers' Party (PSOE)	223,749	52.34	+0.68	3	±0
People's Party (PP)	178,634	41.78	+0.13	3	±0
United Left–Alternative (IU)	13,197	3.09	–0.82	0	±0
Union, Progress and Democracy (UPyD)	3,293	0.77	New	0	±0
The Greens (LV)	1,240	0.29	–0.15	0	±0
United Extremadura (EU)	1,029	0.24	–0.12	0	±0
For a Fairer World (PUM+J)	732	0.17	New	0	±0
Anti-Bullfighting Party Against Mistreatment of Animals (PACMA)	473	0.11	New	0	±0
Communist Party of the Peoples of Spain (PCPE)	420	0.10	–0.05	0	±0
Citizens–Party of the Citizenry (C's)	226	0.05	New	0	±0
Citizens for Blank Votes (CenB)	197	0.05	–0.07	0	±0
National Democracy (DN)	184	0.04	±0.00	0	±0
Spanish Phalanx of the CNSO (FE de las JONS)	157	0.04	+0.01	0	±0
Authentic Phalanx (FA)	106	0.02	–0.01	0	±0
Humanist Party (PH)	104	0.02	–0.02	0	±0
Spanish Alternative (AES)	91	0.02	New	0	±0
Spain 2000 (E–2000)	88	0.02	New	0	±0
Blank ballots	3,595	0.84	–0.47		
Total	427,515			6	±0
Valid votes	427,515	99.36	+0.07		
Invalid votes	2,743	0.64	–0.07		
Votes cast / turnout	430,258	78.60	–0.72		
Abstentions	117,178	21.40	+0.72		
Registered voters	547,436				

=== 2004 ===
Summary of the 14 March 2004 Congress of Deputies election results in Badajoz
Parties and alliances	Popular vote			Seats	
Parties and alliances	Votes	%	±pp	Total	+/−
Spanish Socialist Workers' Party (PSOE)^{1}	219,172	51.66	+6.71	3	±0
People's Party (PP)	176,699	41.65	–5.35	3	±0
United Left–Independent Socialists of Extremadura (IU–SIEx)^{2}	16,589	3.91	–1.71	0	±0
The Greens of Extremadura (LV)	1,886	0.44	–0.03	0	±0
United Extremadura (EU)	1,508	0.36	–0.07	0	±0
Communist Party of the Peoples of Spain (PCPE)	617	0.15	New	0	±0
Citizens for Blank Votes (CenB)	496	0.12	New	0	±0
Democratic and Social Centre (CDS)	423	0.10	+0.02	0	±0
Republican Left (IR)	264	0.06	New	0	±0
Family and Life Party (PFyV)	201	0.05	New	0	±0
Humanist Party (PH)	180	0.04	–0.01	0	±0
National Democracy (DN)	173	0.04	New	0	±0
Spanish Phalanx of the CNSO (FE de las JONS)^{3}	138	0.03	±0.00	0	±0
Authentic Phalanx (FA)	120	0.03	New	0	±0
Republican Social Movement (MSR)	99	0.02	New	0	±0
The Phalanx (FE)	77	0.02	–0.04	0	±0
Blank ballots	5,578	1.31	+0.10		
Total	424,220			6	±0
Valid votes	424,220	99.29	+0.08		
Invalid votes	3,041	0.71	–0.08		
Votes cast / turnout	427,261	79.32	+4.13		
Abstentions	111,389	20.68	–4.13		
Registered voters	538,650				
Sources
Footnotes: ^{1} Spanish Socialist Workers' Party results are compared to the combined totals of Spanish Socialist Workers' Party–Progressives and Extremaduran Coalition in the 2000 election.; ^{2} United Left–Independent Socialists of Extremadura results are compared to the combined totals of United Left and Independent Socialists of Extremadura in the 2000 election.; ^{3} Spanish Phalanx of the CNSO results are compared to Independent Spanish Phalanx–Phalanx 2000 totals in the 2000 election.

=== 2000 ===
Summary of the 12 March 2000 Congress of Deputies election results in Badajoz
Parties and alliances	Popular vote			Seats	
Parties and alliances	Votes	%	±pp	Total	+/−
People's Party (PP)	187,273	47.00	+7.84	3	±0
Spanish Socialist Workers' Party–Progressives (PSOE–p)	178,396	44.77	–4.00	3	±0
United Left (IU)	21,402	5.37	–4.57	0	±0
The Greens of Extremadura (LV)	1,874	0.47	New	0	±0
United Extremadura (EU)	1,723	0.43	New	0	±0
Independent Socialists of Extremadura (SIEx)	994	0.25	±0.00	0	±0
Extremaduran Coalition (PREx–CREx)	723	0.18	–0.61	0	±0
Centrist Union–Democratic and Social Centre (UC–CDS)	308	0.08	–0.04	0	±0
The Phalanx (FE)	238	0.06	New	0	±0
Humanist Party (PH)	198	0.05	New	0	±0
Natural Law Party (PLN)	157	0.04	New	0	±0
Independent Spanish Phalanx–Phalanx 2000 (FEI–FE 2000)	137	0.03	–0.02	0	±0
Spain 2000 Platform (ES2000)	110	0.03	New	0	±0
Spanish Democratic Party (PADE)	86	0.02	New	0	±0
Blank ballots	4,810	1.21	+0.49		
Total	398,429			6	±0
Valid votes	398,429	99.21	–0.39		
Invalid votes	3,179	0.79	+0.39		
Votes cast / turnout	401,608	75.19	–7.86		
Abstentions	132,492	24.81	+7.86		
Registered voters	534,100				

=== 1996 ===
Summary of the 3 March 1996 Congress of Deputies election results in Badajoz
Parties and alliances	Popular vote			Seats	
Parties and alliances	Votes	%	±pp	Total	+/−
Spanish Socialist Workers' Party (PSOE)	208,287	48.77	–3.18	3	–1
People's Party (PP)	167,254	39.16	+4.08	3	+1
United Left–The Greens–Commitment for Extremadura (IU–LV–CE)	42,434	9.94	+0.95	0	±0
Extremaduran Coalition (CEx)^{1}	3,389	0.79	+0.15	0	±0
Independent Socialists of Extremadura (SIEx)	1,073	0.25	New	0	±0
Communist Party of the Peoples of Spain (PCPE)	584	0.14	New	0	±0
Centrist Union (UC)	502	0.12	–1.76	0	±0
Workers' Revolutionary Party (PRT)	288	0.07	New	0	±0
Independent Spanish Phalanx (FEI)	199	0.05	New	0	±0
Blank ballots	3,081	0.72	+0.18		
Total	427,091			6	±0
Valid votes	427,091	99.60	+0.07		
Invalid votes	1,694	0.40	–0.07		
Votes cast / turnout	428,785	83.05	+1.75		
Abstentions	87,512	16.95	–1.75		
Registered voters	516,297				
Sources
Footnotes: ^{1} Extremaduran Coalition results are compared to the combined totals of United Extremadura and Extremaduran Regionalist Party in the 1993 election.

=== 1993 ===
Summary of the 6 June 1993 Congress of Deputies election results in Badajoz
Parties and alliances	Popular vote			Seats	
Parties and alliances	Votes	%	±pp	Total	+/−
Spanish Socialist Workers' Party (PSOE)	211,124	51.95	–2.83	4	±0
People's Party (PP)	142,563	35.08	+11.55	2	±0
United Left of Extremadura (IU)	36,552	8.99	+0.97	0	±0
Democratic and Social Centre (CDS)	7,657	1.88	–8.09	0	±0
United Extremadura (EU)	2,130	0.52	–0.39	0	±0
The Greens (LV)	1,997	0.49	New	0	±0
The Ecologists (LE)	774	0.19	–0.14	0	±0
Extremaduran Regionalist Party (PREx)	483	0.12	New	0	±0
Ruiz-Mateos Group–European Democratic Alliance (ARM–ADE)	394	0.10	–0.57	0	±0
Coalition for a New Socialist Party (CNPS)^{1}	264	0.06	+0.02	0	±0
Natural Law Party (PLN)	171	0.04	New	0	±0
Humanist Party (PH)	119	0.03	–0.02	0	±0
Communist Unification of Spain (UCE)	0	0.00	New	0	±0
Blank ballots	2,206	0.54	+0.06		
Total	406,434			6	±0
Valid votes	406,434	99.53	+0.15		
Invalid votes	1,939	0.47	–0.15		
Votes cast / turnout	408,373	81.30	+5.17		
Abstentions	93,931	18.70	–5.17		
Registered voters	502,304				
Sources
Footnotes: ^{1} Coalition for a New Socialist Party results are compared to Alliance for the Republic totals in the 1989 election.

=== 1989 ===
Summary of the 29 October 1989 Congress of Deputies election results in Badajoz
Parties and alliances	Popular vote			Seats	
Parties and alliances	Votes	%	±pp	Total	+/−
Spanish Socialist Workers' Party (PSOE)	204,473	54.78	–2.47	4	±0
People's Party (PP)^{1}	87,831	23.53	–2.57	2	±0
Democratic and Social Centre (CDS)	37,215	9.97	+1.47	0	±0
United Left (IU)	29,940	8.02	+2.91	0	±0
United Extremadura (EU)	3,406	0.91	–0.08	0	±0
Ruiz-Mateos Group (Ruiz-Mateos)	2,501	0.67	New	0	±0
The Ecologist Greens (LVE)	1,220	0.33	New	0	±0
Spanish Vertex Ecological Development Revindication (VERDE)	1,211	0.32	New	0	±0
Communist Party of the Peoples of Spain (PCPE)	1,162	0.31	New	0	±0
Workers' Party of Spain–Communist Unity (PTE–UC)^{2}	906	0.24	–0.34	0	±0
Workers' Socialist Party (PST)	744	0.20	New	0	±0
Spanish Phalanx of the CNSO (FE–JONS)	541	0.14	New	0	±0
Humanist Party (PH)	188	0.05	New	0	±0
Alliance for the Republic (AxR)	155	0.04	New	0	±0
Blank ballots	1,799	0.48	–0.05		
Total	373,292			6	±0
Valid votes	373,292	99.38	+0.55		
Invalid votes	2,347	0.62	–0.55		
Votes cast / turnout	375,639	76.13	+1.67		
Abstentions	117,765	23.87	–1.67		
Registered voters	493,404				
Sources
Footnotes: ^{1} People's Party results are compared to People's Coalition totals in the 1986 election.; ^{2} Workers' Party of Spain–Communist Unity results are compared to Communists' Unity Board totals in the 1986 election.

=== 1986 ===
Summary of the 22 June 1986 Congress of Deputies election results in Badajoz
Parties and alliances	Popular vote			Seats	
Parties and alliances	Votes	%	±pp	Total	+/−
Spanish Socialist Workers' Party (PSOE)	209,621	57.25	–0.02	4	–1
People's Coalition (AP–PDP–PL)^{1}	95,566	26.10	+2.74	2	±0
Democratic and Social Centre (CDS)	31,110	8.50	+7.05	0	±0
United Left (IU)^{2}	18,727	5.11	+0.90	0	±0
United Extremadura (EU)	3,608	0.99	–2.89	0	±0
Communists' Unity Board (MUC)	2,125	0.58	New	0	±0
Democratic Reformist Party (PRD)	2,023	0.55	New	0	±0
Communist Unification of Spain (UCE)	1,100	0.30	+0.24	0	±0
Party of the Communists of Catalonia (PCC)	286	0.08	New	0	±0
Blank ballots	1,955	0.53	+0.11		
Total	366,121			6	–1
Valid votes	366,121	98.83	+0.52		
Invalid votes	4,340	1.17	–0.52		
Votes cast / turnout	370,461	74.46	–6.29		
Abstentions	127,098	25.54	+6.29		
Registered voters	497,559				
Sources
Footnotes: ^{1} People's Coalition results are compared to People's Alliance–People's Democratic Party totals in the 1982 election.; ^{2} United Left results are compared to Communist Party of Spain totals in the 1982 election.

=== 1982 ===
Summary of the 28 October 1982 Congress of Deputies election results in Badajoz
Parties and alliances	Popular vote			Seats	
Parties and alliances	Votes	%	±pp	Total	+/−
Spanish Socialist Workers' Party (PSOE)	209,144	57.27	+19.97	5	+2
People's Alliance–People's Democratic Party (AP–PDP)^{1}	85,296	23.36	+19.96	2	+2
Union of the Democratic Centre (UCD)	30,647	8.39	–36.21	0	–4
Communist Party of Spain (PCE)	15,368	4.21	–5.18	0	±0
United Extremadura (EU)	14,160	3.88	New	0	±0
Democratic and Social Centre (CDS)	5,288	1.45	New	0	±0
Workers' Socialist Party (PST)	1,310	0.36	New	0	±0
New Force (FN)^{2}	895	0.25	–1.64	0	±0
Spanish Solidarity (SE)	683	0.19	New	0	±0
Communist Unity Candidacy (CUC)	611	0.17	New	0	±0
Communist Unification of Spain (UCE)	225	0.06	New	0	±0
Spanish Phalanx of the CNSO (FE–JONS)	40	0.01	New	0	±0
Socialist Party (PS)^{3}	0	0.00	–0.97	0	±0
Revolutionary Communist League (LCR)	0	0.00	New	0	±0
Blank ballots	1,530	0.42	+0.25		
Total	365,197			7	±0
Valid votes	365,197	98.31	–0.71		
Invalid votes	6,288	1.69	+0.71		
Votes cast / turnout	371,485	80.75	+8.79		
Abstentions	88,571	19.25	–8.79		
Registered voters	460,056				
Sources
Footnotes: ^{1} People's Alliance–People's Democratic Party results are compared to Democratic Coalition totals in the 1979 election.; ^{2} New Force results are compared to National Union totals in the 1979 election.; ^{3} Socialist Party results are compared to Spanish Socialist Workers' Party (historical) totals in the 1979 election.

=== 1979 ===
Summary of the 1 March 1979 Congress of Deputies election results in Badajoz
Parties and alliances	Popular vote			Seats	
Parties and alliances	Votes	%	±pp	Total	+/−
Union of the Democratic Centre (UCD)	146,699	44.60	–2.01	4	±0
Spanish Socialist Workers' Party (PSOE)^{1}	122,680	37.30	+1.76	3	±0
Communist Party of Spain (PCE)	30,873	9.39	+2.52	0	±0
Democratic Coalition (CD)^{2}	11,194	3.40	–3.46	0	±0
National Union (UN)^{3}	6,220	1.89	+0.79	0	±0
Workers' Revolutionary Organization (ORT)^{4}	4,779	1.45	+0.42	0	±0
Spanish Socialist Workers' Party (historical) (PSOEh)^{5}	3,183	0.97	+0.39	0	±0
Party of Labour of Spain (PTE)	1,852	0.56	New	0	±0
Republican Left (IR)	470	0.14	New	0	±0
Communist Movement–Organization of Communist Left (MC–OIC)	369	0.11	New	0	±0
Blank ballots	573	0.17	–0.03		
Total	328,892			7	±0
Valid votes	328,892	99.02	+0.03		
Invalid votes	3,240	0.98	–0.03		
Votes cast / turnout	332,132	71.96	–6.04		
Abstentions	129,445	28.04	+6.04		
Registered voters	461,577				
Sources
Footnotes: ^{1} Spanish Socialist Workers' Party results are compared to the combined totals of Spanish Socialist Workers' Party and People's Socialist Party–Socialist Unity in the 1977 election.; ^{2} Democratic Coalition results are compared to People's Alliance totals in the 1977 election.; ^{3} National Union results are compared to National Alliance July 18 totals in the 1977 election.; ^{4} Workers' Revolutionary Organization results are compared to Workers' Electoral Group totals in the 1977 election.; ^{5} Spanish Socialist Workers' Party (historical) results are compared to Democratic Socialist Alliance totals in the 1977 election.

=== 1977 ===
Summary of the 15 June 1977 Congress of Deputies election results in Badajoz
Parties and alliances	Popular vote			Seats	
Parties and alliances	Votes	%	±pp	Total	+/−
Union of the Democratic Centre (UCD)	148,697	46.61	n/a	4	n/a
Spanish Socialist Workers' Party (PSOE)	107,797	33.79	n/a	3	n/a
Communist Party of Spain (PCE)	21,932	6.87	n/a	0	n/a
People's Alliance (AP)	21,880	6.86	n/a	0	n/a
People's Socialist Party–Socialist Unity (PSP–US)	5,578	1.75	n/a	0	n/a
National Alliance July 18 (AN18)	3,512	1.10	n/a	0	n/a
Workers' Electoral Group (AET)	3,272	1.03	n/a	0	n/a
Federation of Christian Democracy (FPD–ID)	3,141	0.98	n/a	0	n/a
Democratic Socialist Alliance (ASDCI)	1,835	0.58	n/a	0	n/a
Spanish Phalanx of the CNSO (Authentic) (FE–JONS(A))	750	0.24	n/a	0	n/a
Blank ballots	632	0.20	n/a		
Total	319,026			7	n/a
Valid votes	319,026	98.99	n/a		
Invalid votes	3,250	1.01	n/a		
Votes cast / turnout	322,276	78.00	n/a		
Abstentions	90,917	22.00	n/a		
Registered voters	413,193				

== Bibliography ==
- Ley 1/1977, de 4 de enero, para la Reforma Política (Fundamental Law 1/1977). Official State Gazette (in Spanish). 4 January 1977. BOE-A-1977-165.
- Real Decreto-ley 20/1977, de 18 de marzo, sobre Normas Electorales (Royal Decree-Law 20/1977). Official State Gazette (in Spanish). 18 March 1977. BOE-A-1977-7445.
- Constitución Española (Constitution). Official State Gazette (in Spanish). 27 December 1978. BOE-A-1978-31229.
- Ley Orgánica 5/1985, de 19 de junio, del Régimen Electoral General (Organic Law 5/1985). Official State Gazette (in Spanish). 19 June 1985. BOE-A-1985-11672.
- Carreras de Odriozola, Albert; Tafunell Sambola, Xavier (2005) [1989]. Estadísticas históricas de España, siglos XIX-XX (PDF) (in Spanish). Vol. 1 (II ed.). Bilbao: Fundación BBVA. pp. 1072–1097. ISBN 84-96515-00-1. Archived from the original (PDF) on 24 September 2015.
