= Spanish Democratic Socialist Party =

Spanish Democratic Socialist Party Partido Socialista Democrático Español
- President: José M. Martínez de la Pedraja
- Secretary-General: Antonio García López
- Founded: 1975
- Dissolved: 7 April 1978
- Headquarters: Madrid
- Youth wing: Democratic Socialist Youth
- Ideology: Social democracy

The Spanish Democratic Socialist Party (Spanish: Partido Socialista Democrático Español, abbreviation PSDE) was a political party in Spain, active during the transition to democracy. The party was founded in 1975. The party sought to establish a democratic constitution in Spain. Antonio García López was the general secretary of the party.

== Political line ==
PSDE was formed following a split in the Spanish Social Democratic Union (USDE) of Dionisio Ridruejo. The party had an anti-Marxist position, adhering to the social democratic line of Ridruejo. García López sympathized with the Godesberg Program of the Social Democratic Party of Germany. He (albeit supporting legalization of the Communist Party of Spain) rejected any form of alliance with the communists. Moreover, he rejected the 'monopolization' of the socialist movement by the Spanish Socialist Workers' Party (PSOE).

== Leadership ==
The party was led by a National Commission. García López had been the vice chairman of USDE, before the death of Ridruejo. García López had also belonged to PSOE and had argued for an anti-Marxist position within that party. In PSOE García López had been booed by the delegates at the party congress in Suresnes. García López was accused of being a CIA agent, a fact that made other groups suspicious of PSDE. José M. Martínez de la Pedraja served as the PSDE party chairman. Jesús Prados Arrarte was the first vice president of the party. Ana María Pérez del Campo, vice president of the Association of Separated Women, also served as vice party president. Manuel Gómez Reino was the assistant general secretary of the party.

== History ==
=== Legalization ===
In early 1976 a group in Valencia broke away from PSDE and formed the Unified Democratic Socialist Party (PSDU). In the summer of 1976 the Valencia-based Labour Party merged into the PSDE. In August 1976 the PSDE founded the Sindicato Democrático de Ganaderos Montañeses, an agrarian union headed by Martínez de la Pedraja, in Santander. On September 11, 1976, PSDE submitted an application for legal registration as a political party to the General Director of Interior Politics. The application was drafted following a meeting between the party and the president of the Government. PSDE was legally registered on October 4, 1976.

=== Alliances ===
In late 1976 PSDE entered into coalition talks with the Spanish Socialist Workers' Party (historic) (PSOE(H)) and Spanish Social Reform (RSE). The three parties formed the Democratic Socialist Alliance. In November 1976 workers from PSDE and RSE joined the PSOE(H) trade union, Unión General de Trabajadores (sector histórico) (UGT(H)). In February 1977 PSDE, PSOE(H), RSE and the Social Democratic Federation (FSD) formed a new alliance, the Centre-Left Electoral Union. In April 1977 PSDE and PSOE(H) jointly founded the Democratic Socialist Youth.

On May 3, 1977, PSDE and PSOE(H) formalized the constitution of the Democratic Socialist Alliance. FSD had left the Centre-Left Electoral Union, and RSE was expelled from the Democratic Socialist Alliance due to differences with PSOE(H). RSE did however closely association with the alliance, but contested the elections with separate candidatures.

In the words of García López the Democratic Socialist Alliance was an embryo of a united Spanish socialist party. Ahead of the elections, García López traveled to Brussels to negotiate for support for the Democratic Socialist Alliance from the European socialist movement.

=== Defections from the party ===
In February 1977, the vice presidents Pérez del Campo and Prados Arrarte left the party. Another prominent PSDE to leave the party was Ulpiano Sánchez Vilchez, vice president of the Madrid organization of PSDE.

=== 1977 elections ===
In the 1977 general election the Democratic Socialist Alliance obtained 101,916 votes (0.56% of the national vote). PSDE ran a separate list in Santander, where the party obtained 3,786 votes (1,48% of the votes in that province). Towards the end of June 1977 the leaderships of both PSDE and PSOE(H) declared that the Democratic Socialist Alliance had been dissolved.
