= Raúl Hernández =

Raúl Hernández may refer to:

- Raúl Hernández (rower) (born 1992), Cuban Olympic rower
- Raúl Hernández Garrido (born 1964), Spanish playwright
- Raúl Lucio Hernández Lechuga, former Mexican drug lord
- Raúl Hernández Barrón (1977–2014), deceased Mexican drug lord
