= Unión General de Trabajadores (sector histórico) =

UGT(H)
- Unión General de Trabajadores (sector histórico)
- Location: Spain
- Key people: José Gómez Egidio, president

Unión General de Trabajadores (sector histórico) ('General Workers' Union (historical sector)', abbreviated UGT(H)) was a trade union centre in Spain during the Transition years. UGT(H) emerged from a split in the Unión General de Trabajadores and was linked to the Spanish Socialist Workers' Party (historic) (PSOE(H)). The split in UGT was linked to the split in PSOE after its 1973 congress in Toulouse.

== Leadership ==
José Gómez Egidio was the president of UGT(H). Felipe Redondo was the vice president of the organization. Lázaro Movilla served as treasurer and national spokesperson of UGT(H). Other veteran socialists in the UGT(H) leadership were Isaac Pérez (secretary), Felipe López, Francisco Biedma, José Alarcón and Benito Guaza. The national committee of UGT(H), with these men and three others representing trade unionists in exile, was named in January 1976 by the provincial federations of UGT(H).

== Political profile ==
UGT(H) claimed to be the genuine inheritor of the tradition of the original UGT. The other UGT group rejected these claims, stating that the name of UGT(H) was creating confusion amongst workers. At a public meeting of UGT(H) in Madrid in 1977 a group of UGT cadres disrupted the event, shouting slogans in support of the UGT leadership.

UGT(H) sought return of UGT properties expropriated after the Spanish Civil War. UGT(H) had close links to the Confederación Nacional del Trabajo, with which it shared a common view on the latter developments inside the Republican camp in the Civil War. UGT(H) was vehemently anti-communist and opposed the unity process of the labour movement advocated by Comisiones Obreras.

PSOE(H) members were obliged to be members of UGT(H), a policy inherited from Pablo Iglesias from the early years of PSOE. Apart from PSOE(H), UGT(H) was also joined by members of the Spanish Democratic Socialist Party (PSDE) and Spanish Social Reform (RSE) (two anti-Marxist groups). These parties were also allies of PSOE(H) in the Socialist and Democratic Alliance.
