= Jaén (surname) =

Jaén (Spanish pronunciation: [xaˈen]), also spelled Djaen, is a Spanish surname, after the city of Jaén. Notable people with the surname include:

- Álvaro Jaén (born 1981), Spanish politician
- Diana Jaén (born 1993), Panamanian model
- Miguel Ángel López Jaén (born 1982), Spanish tennis player
- Sabetay Djaen (1883–1947), Bulgarian-Argentinian Sephardi rabbi
