= Francisco Garrido Peña =

Spanish politician (born 1958)

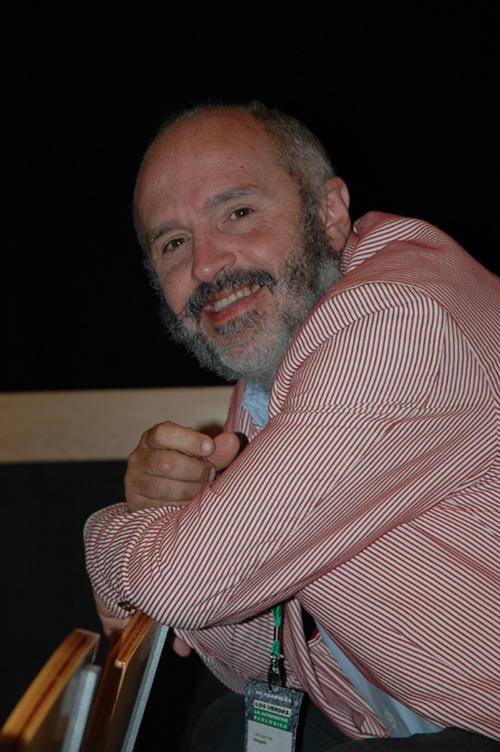
Image of Francisco Garrido Peña

Francisco Garrido Peña (born 25 March 1958 in Seville, Spain) is a Spanish politician and member of the Green Party, which has previously supported the Spanish Socialist Workers' Party (PSOE) in the Spanish Congress of Deputies.

Garrido received a Doctorate in philosophy from the University of Granada, and became a University professor in Jaen. He sat in the Parliament of Andalusia from 1994 to 1996 after being elected in the lists of the United Left. In 2004, following a pact between the PSOE and the Greens, he was elected to the Spanish Congress in the PSOE lists representing Seville Province and served until 2008.
