= Siege of Jaén =

Siege of Jaén may refer to:

- Siege of Jaén (1225)
- Siege of Jaén (1230)
- Siege of Jaén (1245–46)

== See also ==
- Jaén (disambiguation)
