= Cayetana blanca =

Variety of grape

- Grape (Vitis)
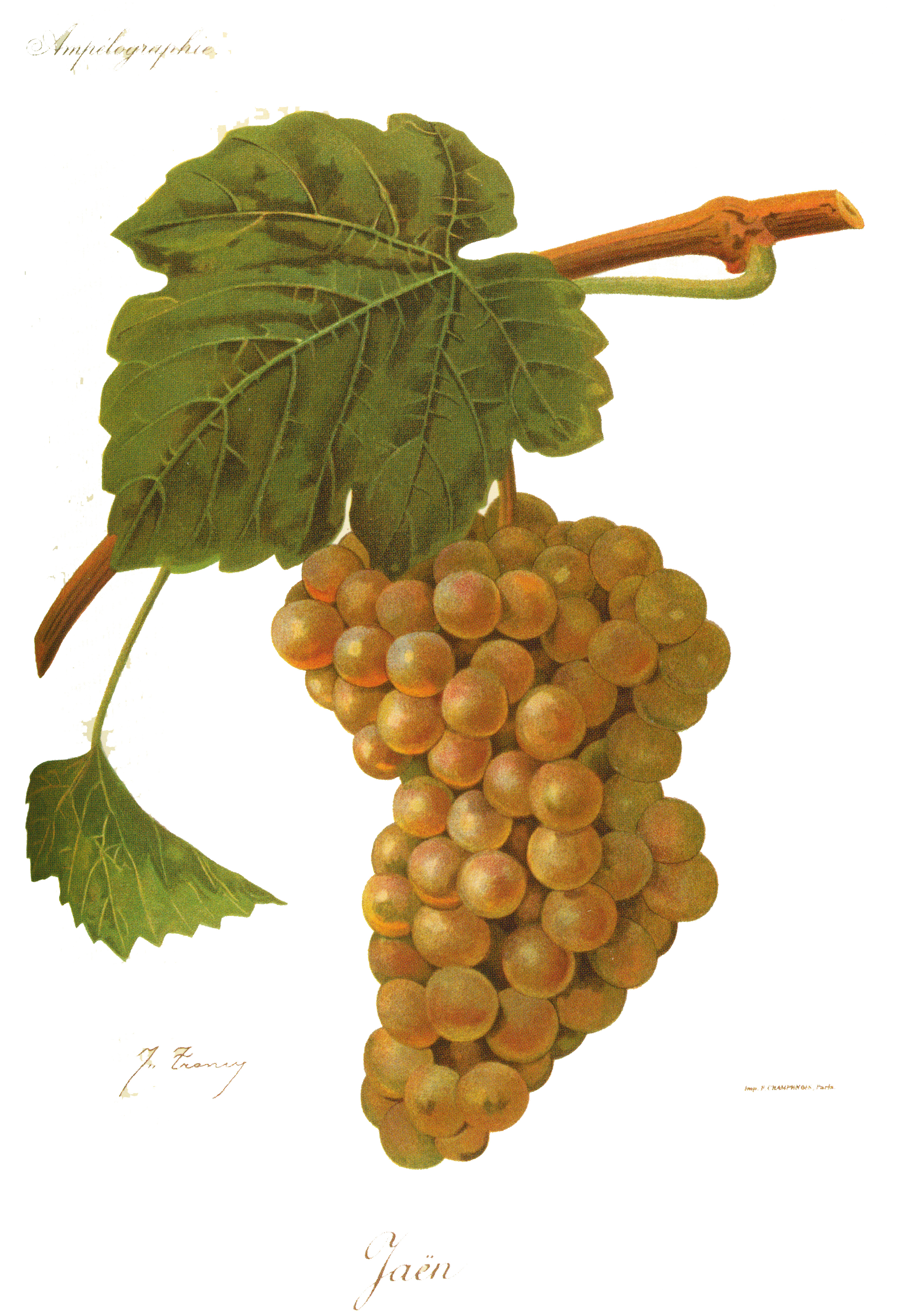
- Cayetana blanca as illustrated on L'Ampélographie by Viala and Vermorel
- Color of berry skin: Blanc
- Species: Vitis vinifera
- Also called: Cayetana, Jaén blanco, Baladí, Cagazal, etc.
- Origin: Spain
- Pedigree parent 1: Hebén
- Notable regions: Jerez
- Formation of seeds: Complete
- Sex of flowers: Hermaphrodite
- VIVC number: 5648

Cayetana blanca, also known as Cayetana or Jaén, is a white Spanish wine grape. It is grown mainly in the south of Spain, especially in Extremadura and in the Jerez region where it is distilled for use in brandy production.

It is mentioned in the 1513 treatise Obra de Agricultura by Gabriel Alonso de Herrera. It may have originated in the Alentejo region of Portugal, although it is now rare in that area.

Cayetana Blanca was the third most planted white grape variety in Spain, with 39,919 ha (98,640 acres) in 2015, totalling 4% of the grapes and 9% of the white variety hectarage.

== Synonyms ==
Cayetana blanca is also known under several synonyms, including multiple spelling variant for each:

- Amor blanco, as it is known in the Canary Islands
- Baladí, also known as Baladi-Verdejo or Balay in Córdoba, Verdeja, Belledy
- Cagazal or Cazagal, also Navas Cazagal or simply Naves, as it is known is La Rioja
- Charelo, also known as Charello, Chaselo, Cheres, Cirial (in Jaén), Xarello (not to be confused with Xarel·lo)
- Djiniani, as it is known in Morocco
- Fartagoso, also known as Fartagosos or Farta Gosos in Sagunto, Valencia
- Garido, also known as Garrida, Garriga, Garilla or Garrillo, names used in the Province of Seville (not to be confused with Garrido Fino from Huelva)
- Jaén, also known as Jaén blanco, Jaén doradillo, Jaén empinadillo, Jaén prieto, Jaén prieto blanco, Jaenes, Jainas, Jarime, Jaén de Castilla, Jaén de Letur, Jaén de Letur de Maratella, Jaén doré, Doradillo (Australia), Plateadillo, Plateado
- Maizancho, also Machuenco, in Ciudad Real and Valdepeñas
- Morisco, also known as Mourisco arsello, Mourisco branco or Mourisco Portalegre in Portugal
- Parda, also known as Pardilla or Pardina in Badajoz
- Pirulés, also known as Pirulet, Virules
- Robal in Zaragoza and Calatayud
- Sarigo in Trás-os-Montes and Alto Douro, Portugal

Other synonyms include Aujubi, Dedo or Dedro, Hoja vuelta, Mariouti, Neruca and Tierra de Barros. However, some synonyms can lead to confusion. In Spain, Cayetana blanca is also known as Jaén (including the variants Jaén blanco and Jaén rosado), but his is ambiguous since there are other varieties with the same name, such as Mencía (from El Bierzo and Ribeira Sacra), which is known as Jaén colorado in Léon and as Jaen do Dão in Dão, Portugal, and Jaén tinto from Andalusia. In English sources Jaén with the Spanish accent often refers to Cayetana, while the Portuguese spelling without the accent (Jaen) refers to Mencía. Avesso, which may be related to Jaen, is also often mistaken for Cayetana blanca. Albillo Mayor (Ribera del Duero), Calagraño (La Rioja), Doradilla and Xarel·lo from Catalonia are commonly confused as well.
