= Miguel Ángel Garrido Gallardo =

Spanish philologist and semiotician (born 1945)

- Born: September 7, 1945; Lubrín, Almería, Spain
- Occupation: Philologist

Miguel Ángel Garrido Gallardo (born September 7, 1945, in Lubrín, Almería, Spain) is a Spanish philologist and semiotician. He is the adopted son of the town of Los Santos de Maimona (Badajoz, Spain). He is a professor of research at the Consejo Superior de Investigaciones Cientificas (CSIC) [National Council for Scientific Research] in Madrid and distinguished university professor.

Known primarily for his contributions to the progress of semiotics in the field of Hispanic philology, he has been the promoter of the International Conference on Semiotics and Hispanism (Madrid, 1983), first president of the Spanish Association of Semiotics (1983–1987), member of the executive committee of the International Association for Semiotic Studies (1983–1998), advisor for Arts and Social Sciences to the CSIC chairmanship (1996–2000), member from 1999 to 2001 of the International Committee of Experts in charge of Italian Encyclopedia, Delegate of the International Union of Academies (1999–2005), president of the Spanish Association of Literary Theory and Comparative Literature (2001–2005), promoter of Institut for Spanish Language (2000–2002), director of the "Curso de Alta Especialización en Filología Hispánica" and general director of the Chair "Dámaso Alonso", for the cooperation between European and American universities (2000–2012). He taught regular courses in the universities of Seville, Navarre and Madrid Complutense (35 years) and had given speeches, seminars and Ph.D. Courses in other universities from 25 countries and four continents.

Currently, he is director of the Spanish Dictionary of International Literary Terms, director of the Culture Division of the “Obra Pía de Los Pizarro” Foundation and editor of the Nueva Revista de Política Cultura y Arte.

For 30 years (1980–2010) he has been director of Revista de Literatura (CSIC) and member of the supervisory body of 25 Spanish and international journals and bibliographic collections. He is author of a large collection of works on language theory and about the Spanish Language, Culture and Literature.

He is also correspondent member of the Academia Argentina de Letras, of the Academia Chilena de la Lengua and of the Academia Nacional de Letras, del Uruguay.

Among other distinctions, Garrido Gallardo has been awarded with the prize Antonio of Nebrija (2011), the prize 'Julian Marias' of research in human and social sciences (2012), the prize 'Castelar' (2013) and the international 'Menéndez Pelayo' award (2016).

== Books ==
- Crítica Literaria: La doctrina de Lucien Goldmann, Madrid, Rialp, 1973, 1996 (2ª ed.) .
- Novela y Ensayo Contemporáneos, Madrid, La Muralla, 1975.
- Introducción a la Teoría de la Literatura , Madrid, SGEL, 1975.
- Literatura y Sociedad en la España de Franco, Madrid, Prensa Española, 1976.
- Estudios de Semiótica literaria, Madrid, CSIC, 1982
- Teoría Semiótica: lenguajes y textos hispánicos (Edición de Actas), Madrid, CSIC, 1985.
- Crítica semiológica de textos literarios hispánicos (Edición de Actas), Madrid, CSIC, 1986.
- La crisis de la literariedad (con T.Todorov et alii), Madrid, Taurus, 1987.
- Teoría de los géneros literarios. Estudio Preliminar, compilación de textos y bibliografía, Madrid, Arco/Libros, 1988.
- Índices de "Revista de Literatura" (1–100), Madrid, CSIC, 1990.
- Mil libros de Teoría de la literatura (en colaboración con L. Alburquerque), Madrid, CSIC, 1991.
- La Teoría literaria de György Lukács, Valencia, Amós Belinchón, 1992.
- La Musa de la Retórica. Problemas y métodos de la Ciencia de la Literatura, Madrid, CSIC, 1994.
- La moderna crítica literaria hispánica (Antología de textos), Madrid, Mapfre, 1997.
- Nueva Introducción a La Teoría de la Literatura, Madrid, Síntesis, 2000, 2004 (3ª ed. corregida y aumentada).
- La obra literaria de Josemaría Escrivá, Pamplona, Eunsa, 2002.
- Retóricas españolas del siglo XVI escritas en latín, Madrid, CSIC/F. Hernando Larramendi, 2004. (En CD-ROM).
- Teoría/Crítica. Homenaje a Carmen Bobes (Edic. de Textos en colaboración con E.Frechilla), Madrid, CSIC, 2007.
- El "Quijote" y el pensamiento teórico-literario (Edición de Actas en colaboración con L.Alburquerque), Madrid, CSIC, 2008.
- El lenguaje literario. Vocabulario crítico (Con la colaboración de Lubomir Doležel et alii), Madrid, Síntesis, 2009.
- DETLI. Elenco de términos, Buenos Aires, Union Académique Internationale / Academia Argentina de Letras, 2009.
- "Retórica y periodismo", en C. Martínez Pasamar (ed.), Estrategias argumentativas en el discurso periodístico, Fráncfort, Peter Lang, 2010, 11–29.
- Laicidad y laicismo. Estudio semántico. (Con la colaboración de O. González de Cardedal et alii), Madrid, Rialp, 2011.
- La Biblioteca de Occidente en contexto hispánico (Edición de Actas), Madrid, UNIR ed., 2013.
- El futuro de la literatura y el libro, Lima, Universidad del Pacífico, 2014.
- Diccionario español de Términos Literarios Internacionales 2015. [ on line]
- El Arte de hablar en público, de Elio Antonio de Nebrija. Traducción al latín, edición y notas. Madrid, Rialp, 2017.
- [Sobre M.A. Garrido Gallardo]. Comentarios de textos literarios hispánicos. Homenaje a Miguel Ángel Garrido, Editado por E.Torre y J.L.García Barrientos (Madrid, Síntesis, 1997).
- [Sobre M.A. Garrido Gallardo]. Vir bonus dicendi peritus. Homenaje al profesor Miguel Ángel Garrido Gallardo. Coordinado por L. Alburquerque, J.L. García Barrientos, A. Garrido y A. Suárez. (Madrid, CSIC, 2019)
