= Gil Garrido Sr. =

Panamanian baseball player (born 1919)

- Infielder
- Born: 1 September 1919; Panama City, Panama
- Batted: Right Threw: Right

Negro league baseball debut
- 1944, for the New York Cubans

Last appearance
- 1945, for the New York Cubans

Career statistics
- Batting average: .216
- Hits: 25
- Home runs: 0
- Stats at Baseball Reference

Teams
- New York Cubans (1944–1945)
Medals
Men's baseball
Representing Panama
Central American and Caribbean Games
Silver medal – second place	1938 Panama	Team

Gil Gonzalo Ortega Garrido Sr. (born 1 September 1919) is a Panamanian former professional baseball second baseman, third baseman and shortstop who played in the Negro leagues in the 1940s.

A native of Panama City, Panama, Garrido is the father of major leaguer Gil Garrido. He made his Negro leagues debut in 1944 with the New York Cubans, and played for New York again the following season before going on to play in the Mexican League in 1946.
