= Gil Garrido =

Panamanian baseball player (born 1941)

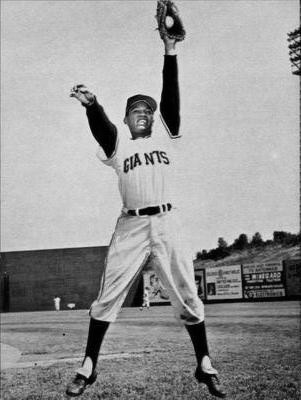
- Infielder
- Born: June 26, 1941 (age 84); Panama City, Panama
- Batted: Right Threw: Right

MLB debut
- April 24, 1964, for the San Francisco Giants

Last MLB appearance
- October 3, 1972, for the Atlanta Braves

MLB statistics
- Batting average: .237
- Home runs: 1
- Runs batted in: 51
- Stats at Baseball Reference

Teams
- San Francisco Giants (1964); Atlanta Braves (1968–1972)

Gil Gonzalo Garrido Jr. (born June 26, 1941) is a Panamanian former infielder in Major League Baseball, playing mainly at shortstop for two different teams between the 1964 and 1972 seasons. Listed at 5 feet 9 inches (1.75 m), 150 pounds (68 kg), Garrido batted and threw right-handed.

Born in Panama City, Panama, Garrido is the son of Negro league baseball player Gil Garrido Sr. Garrido was 22 years old when he entered the majors in 1964 with the San Francisco Giants, playing for them one year before joining the Atlanta Braves (1968–1972). His most productive season came in 1970, when he posted career numbers in games (101), batting average (.264), runs (38), RBI (19), hits (97) and extra bases (10). He also appeared in the 1969 NLCS won by the New York Mets over Atlanta, 3–0, and went 2-for-10.

In a six-season career, Garrido was a .237 hitter (207-for-872) with one home run and 51 RBI in 334 games, including 81 runs, 14 doubles, one triple, and two stolen bases.

Garrido also played from 1960 through 1968 in the San Francisco (1960–1965) and Atlanta (1966–1968) Minor league systems. In parts of nine seasons, he hit .266 with 18 homers and 328 RBI in 1177 games.

== Fact ==
- On May 27, 1970, at Atlanta Stadium, Garrido connected for his only major league home run against Houston Astros pitcher Denny Lemaster .

== See also ==
- List of players from Panama in Major League Baseball
