= Álvaro Jaén =

Spanish politician (born 1981)

- Álvaro Jaén Barbado
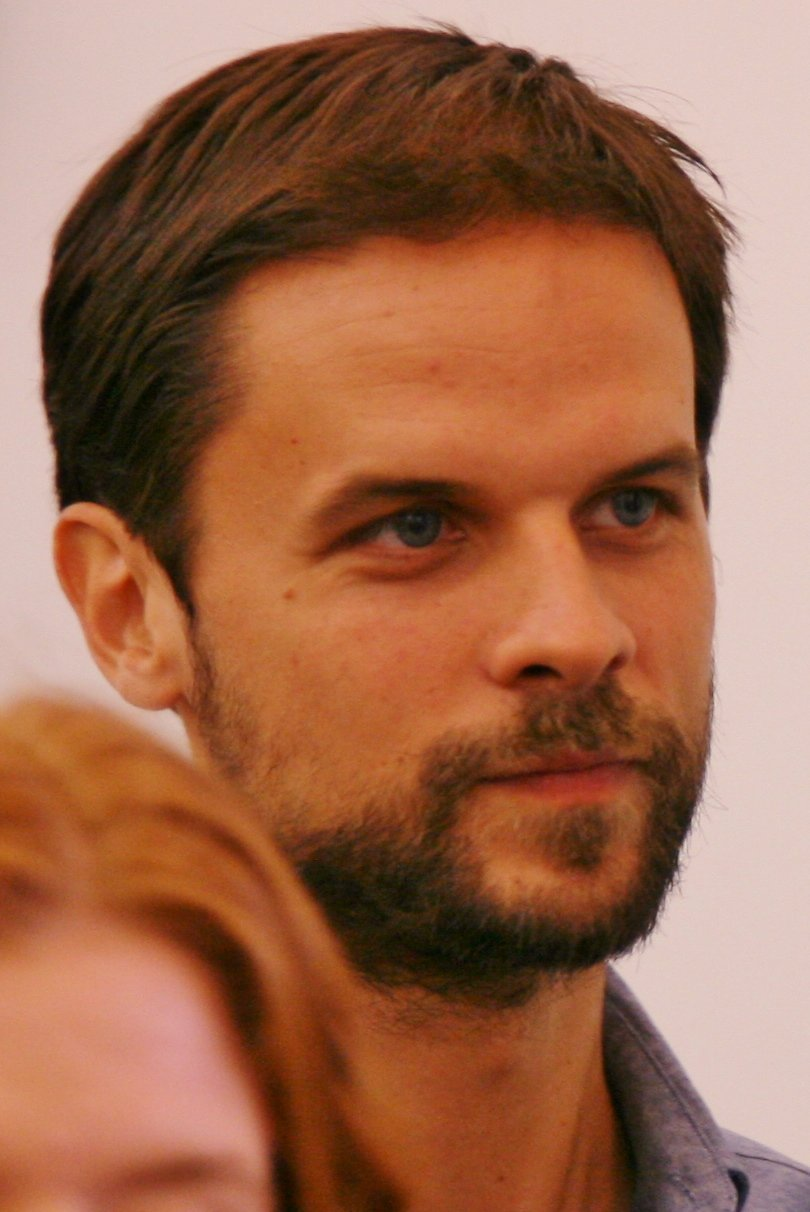

Secretary-General of Podemos Extremadura
- Incumbent
- Assumed office 14 February 2015
- Preceded by: Position established

Deputy in the Assembly of Extremadura
- Incumbent
- Assumed office 23 June 2015
- Constituency: Cáceres

Personal details
- Born: 9 December 1981 (age 43); Madrid, Spain
- Political party: Podemos
- Education: Political Science
- Alma mater: Complutense University of Madrid

Álvaro Jaén Barbado (born 9 December 1981 in Madrid, Spain) is a Spanish politician, deputy in the Assembly of Extremadura and member of Podemos.

Son of Extremaduran emigrants in Madrid, Álvaro Jaén graduated in Political Science by the Complutense University of Madrid.

Before joining Podemos, he has had numerous jobs like agricultural day laborer or substitute teacher. In February 2015, he was elected as Secretary-General of Podemos in Extremadura by the party’s bases, likewise being designated in April as presidential candidate of the Junta of Extremadura.

In November 2016, he was reelected Secretary-General of Podemos-Extremadura.
