= Democratic Socialist Alliance (Spain) =

Democratic Socialist Alliance Alianza Socialista Democrática
- Founded: October 30, 1976
- Dissolved: June 25, 1977
- Ideology: Democratic socialism Social democracy
- Political position: Left-wing

Democratic Socialist Alliance (Spanish: Alianza Socialista Democrática, ASDCI) was a Spanish party alliance formed to contest the 1977 general election by the Spanish Socialist Workers' Party (historical) (PSOEh) and the Spanish Democratic Socialist Party (PSDE). Spanish Social Reform (RSE) was expected to be a member of the alliance, but both the PSOEh and RSE broke up during the making up of the candidates' lists.

== Member parties ==
- Spanish Socialist Workers' Party (historical) (PSOEh)
- Spanish Democratic Socialist Party (PSDE)
