= Garrido Fino =

Variety of grape

- Grape (Vitis)
- Color of berry skin: Blanc
- Species: Vitis vinifera
- Also called: see list of synonyms
- Origin: Spain
- Notable regions: Huelva
- VIVC number: 4470

Garrido Fino is a white wine grape grown mainly in the province of Huelva, in the region of Andalusia, Spain.

== Synonyms ==
Garrido Fino is also known under the synonyms Charrido Fino, Garrido Fino de Villanueva, Garrío Fino, and Palomino Garrío.
