= Raúl Hernández Garrido =

Spanish playwright

Raúl Hernández Garrido (born 1964) is a Spanish playwright. He won the Calderon de la Barca Prize in 1994 for his play Los Malditos ('The Damned Ones'); the Lope de Vega Prize in 1997 for his play Los engranajes ('The Gears') and the Born Theatre Prize in 2000 for his play Si un dia me olvidaras^{[usurped]} ('When you'll forget me').

He is also TV Producer and Cinema Director. He wrote and directed the films 'Escuadra hacia la muerte' (TVE 2006) and 'Antes de morir piensa en mi' (2008).
