= Jaén tinto (grape) =

Variety of grape

Jaén tinto, also known as Jaén negro, is a red Spanish-wine grape variety native to southern and central Spain. Jaén tinto is a distinct genetic variety officially authorized for wine production in the autonomous communities of Andalusia and Extremadura.
