= Socialist Action Party (Spain) =

Socialist Action Party Partido de Acción Socialista
- Leader: Andrés Cuevas González; Luis Aurelio Sánchez; Rodolfo Llopis
- Founded: 1972
- Dissolved: 2001
- Headquarters: C/ Félix Boix 7, 6º-E (28036), Madrid
- Ideology: Democratic socialism Republicanism; Federalism
- Political position: Left-wing
- National affiliation: United Left (1986–2001)
- Union affiliation: UGT (sector histórico)

The Socialist Action Party (Spanish: Partido de Acción Socialista, PASOC) was a socialist political party in Spain, founded in 1972 as the Spanish Socialist Workers Party (historical sector).

== History ==
The party was founded in 1972 as the Spanish Socialist Workers' Party (historical sector) or PSOE(h), as a result of a split of the Spanish Socialist Workers' Party. In 1977 the party changed its name to Socialist Party and in 1982 adopted its definitive name. In 1986 the party joined United Left, leaving the coalition in 2001 and disappearing soon after.

== Prominent PASOC/PSOE(h) politicians ==
- Alonso José Puerta. Member of the European Parliament (1987-2004). Vicepresident of the European Parliament and president of the GUE/NGL parliamentary group.
- Andrés Cuevas González. Member of the Parliament of Andalusia.
- Froilán Reina. Member of the Regional Assembly of Murcia.
- Franco González. Member of the Assembly of Madrid.
- Inés Sabanés. Member of the Assembly of Madrid.
- Luis Alonso Novo. Member of the Assembly of Madrid.
- Adolfo de Luxán. Member of the Assembly of Madrid.
- Antón Saavedra. Member of the General Junta of the Principality of Asturias.
