= Spanish Social Reform =

Defunct political party in Spain

Spanish Social Reform Reforma Social Española
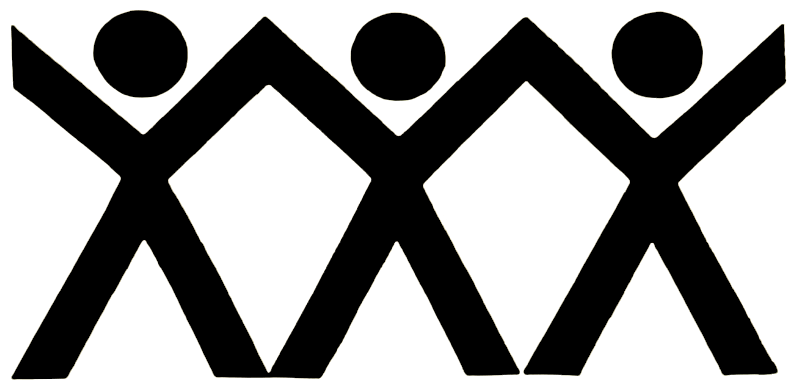
- Leader: Manuel Cantarero del Castillo
- Founded: 1976
- Dissolved: October 1977
- Ideology: Social democracy
- Political position: Centre-left

Spanish Social Reform (Spanish: Reforma Social Española, RSE) was a Spanish political party founded in 1976 by Manuel Cantarero del Castillo, a former francoist leader. It contested the 1977 general election, scoring a disappointing result and failing to win any seat. It was subsequently dissolved in October 1977, with some of its members joining the Spanish Socialist Workers' Party (PSOE). Manuel Cantarero would join the Liberal Citizens Action of José María de Areilza, which in the 1979 general election would run within the Democratic Coalition.
