= Barcelona (Senate constituency) =

Senate constituency in Spain

Coordinates: 41°27′N 2°5′E

- Senate of Spain; Electoral constituency
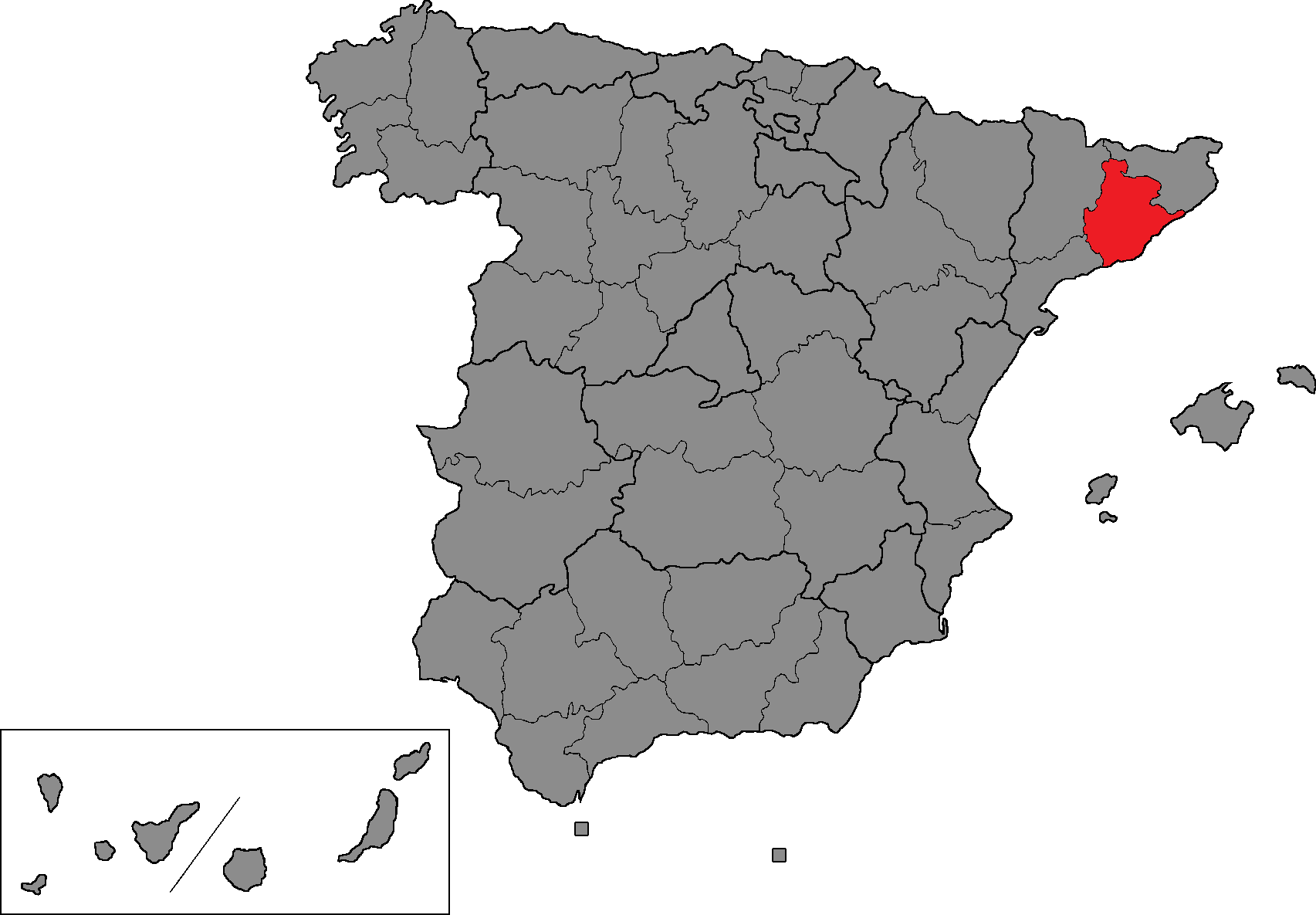
- Location of Barcelona within Spain
- Province: Barcelona
- Autonomous community: Catalonia
- Population: ▲5,899,063 (2024)
- Electorate: ▲4,243,500 (2023)
- Major settlements: Barcelona, Hospitalet de Llobregat, Badalona, Terrassa, Sabadell, Mataró, Santa Coloma de Gramenet

Current constituency
- Created: 1977
- Seats: 4
- Members: PSC (3); ERC (1)

Barcelona is one of the 60 constituencies represented in the Senate of Spain, the upper chamber of the Spanish parliament, the Cortes Generales. The constituency (whose boundaries correspond to those of the homonymous province) elects four senators. The electoral system uses open-list (Note: Parties can group candidates into lists, although each candidate is treated separately for the purpose of the voting procedure.) partial block voting, with electors voting for individual candidates instead of parties. Electors can vote for up to three candidates.

== Electoral system ==
The constituency was created as per the Political Reform Law and was first contested in the 1977 general election. The Law provided for the provinces of Spain to be established as multi-member districts in the Senate, with this regulation being maintained under the Spanish Constitution of 1978. Additionally, the Constitution requires for any modification of the provincial limits to be approved under an organic law, needing an absolute majority in the Cortes Generales.

Voting is based on universal suffrage, comprising all Spanish nationals over 18 years of age with full political rights, provided that they have not been deprived of the right to vote by a final sentence. The only exception was in 1977, when this was limited to nationals over 21 years of age and in full enjoyment of their political and civil rights. Amendments in 2011 required non-resident citizens to apply for voting, a system known as "begged" voting (Spanish: Voto rogado). which was abolished in 2022. Further, amendments in 2018 granted the right to vote to those legally incapacitated. 209 Senate seats (207 in 1977, 208 from 1978 to 2026) are elected using open-list partial block voting: voters in constituencies electing four seats can choose up to three candidates; in those with two or three seats, up to two; and in single-member districts, one. Each of the 47 peninsular provinces is allocated four seats, while in insular provinces—such as the Balearic and Canary Islands—the districts are the islands themselves, with the larger ones (Mallorca, Gran Canaria and Tenerife) being allocated three seats each, and the smaller ones (Menorca, Ibiza, Formentera, Fuerteventura, La Gomera, El Hierro, Lanzarote and La Palma) one each. (Note: La Gomera and El Hierro comprised a single constituency for the 1977 election. A constitutional reform in 2026 awarded Formentera an independent senator separate from Ibiza.) Ceuta and Melilla elect two seats each. Until 1985, the law also provided for by-elections to fill Senate seats vacated up to two years into the legislature; subsequently, any vacancies arising after the proclamation of candidates and during the legislative term are filled by the next candidates on the party lists or, when required, by designated substitutes.

The electoral law allows for parties and federations registered in the interior ministry, alliances and groupings of electors to present lists of candidates. Parties and federations intending to form an alliance are required to inform the relevant electoral commission within 10 days of the election call—15 before 1985—whereas groupings of electors need to secure the signature of at least one percent of the electorate in the constituencies for which they seek election—one permille of the electorate, with a compulsory minimum of 500 signatures, until 1985—disallowing electors from signing for more than one list. Also since 2011, parties, federations or alliances that have not obtained a mandate in either chamber of the Cortes at the preceding election are required to secure the signature of at least 0.1 percent of electors in the aforementioned constituencies. Amendments in 2007 required a balanced composition of men and women in the electoral lists, so that candidates of either sex made up at least 40 percent of the total composition; further amendments in 2024 required the use of a zipper system.

== Senators ==
Senators for Barcelona 1977–
Key to parties Pl'E ECP ERC EdC NE ECdP PSC AEX CatSen CiU
Legislature	Election	Distribution
Constituent	1977	3 / 1
1st	1979	1 / 3
2nd	1982	3 / 1
2nd	1983	3 / 1
3rd	1986	3 / 1
4th	1989	3 / 1
5th	1993	3 / 1
6th	1996	3 / 1
7th	2000	3 / 1
8th	2004	3 / 1
9th	2008	3 / 1
10th	2011	3 / 1
11th	2015	3 / 1
12th	2016	3 / 1
13th	2019 (Apr)	2 / 2
14th	2019 (Nov)	3 / 1
15th	2023	1 / 3

== General elections ==
=== 2023 ===
Summary of the 23 July 2023 Senate of Spain election results in Barcelona
Parties and alliances	Popular vote			Seats	
Parties and alliances	Votes	%	±pp	Total	+/−
Socialists' Party of Catalonia (PSC–PSOE)	2,457,508	33.20	+10.70	3	+2
Republican Left of Catalonia–Left for Independence (ERC–EI)	1,333,841	18.02	−9.03	1	−2
People's Party (PP)	1,057,440	14.29	+4.89	0	±0
Unite–In Common We Can (Sumar–ECP)^{1}	1,018,990	13.77	−1.61	0	±0
Together for Catalonia (Junts)^{2}	814,955	11.01	n/a	0	±0
Vox (Vox)	464,410	6.27	+4.40	0	±0
Animalist Party with the Environment (PACMA)^{3}	139,964	1.89	−0.33	0	±0
Catalan European Democratic Party–CiU Space (PDeCAT–E–CiU)^{2}	36,733	0.50	n/a	0	±0
Communist Party of the Workers of Catalonia (PCTC)	18,737	0.25	+0.16	0	±0
Zero Cuts (Recortes Cero)	17,651	0.24	−0.08	0	±0
Blank ballots (Note: The percentage of blank ballots is calculated over the official number of valid votes cast, irrespective of the total number of votes shown as a result of adding up the individual results for each party.)	40,954	1.57	+0.06		
Total	7,401,183			4	±0
Valid votes	2,609,300	98.15	−0.42		
Invalid votes	49,163	1.85	+0.42		
Votes cast / turnout	2,658,463	62.65	−6.77		
Abstentions	1,585,037	37.35	+6.77		
Registered voters	4,243,500				
Sources
Footnotes: ^{1} Unite–In Common We Can results are compared to the combined totals of In Common We Can–Let's Win the Change and More Country in the November 2019 election.; ^{2} Within the Together for Catalonia–Together alliance in the November 2019 election.; ^{3} Animalist Party with the Environment results are compared to Animalist Party Against Mistreatment of Animals totals in the November 2019 election.

=== November 2019 ===
Summary of the 10 November 2019 Senate of Spain election results in Barcelona
Parties and alliances	Popular vote			Seats	
Parties and alliances	Votes	%	±pp	Total	+/−
Republican Left of Catalonia–Sovereigntists (ERC–Sobiranistes)	2,174,773	27.05	+1.55	3	+1
Socialists' Party of Catalonia (PSC–PSOE)	1,808,532	22.50	−1.70	1	−1
In Common We Can–Let's Win the Change (ECP–Guanyem el Canvi)	1,196,038	14.88	+0.36	0	±0
Together for Catalonia–Together (JxCat–Junts)	1,096,413	13.64	+2.51	0	±0
People's Party (PP)	755,871	9.40	+3.11	0	±0
Citizens–Party of the Citizenry (Cs)	527,051	6.56	−3.75	0	±0
Animalist Party Against Mistreatment of Animals (PACMA)	178,239	2.22	−0.16	0	±0
Vox (Vox)	150,245	1.87	−0.97	0	±0
More Country (Más País)	40,442	0.50	New	0	±0
Zero Cuts–Green Group (Recortes Cero–GV)	25,348	0.32	+0.04	0	±0
Communist Party of the Catalan People (PCPC)	14,545	0.18	+0.04	0	±0
Feminist Initiative (IFem)	14,139	0.18	New	0	±0
Communist Party of the Workers of Catalonia (PCTC)	7,074	0.09	−0.02	0	±0
For a Fairer World (PUM+J)	3,955	0.05	New	0	±0
Left in Positive (IZQP)	2,488	0.03	−0.03	0	±0
Blank ballots	43,483	1.51	+0.25		
Total	8,038,636			4	±0
Valid votes	2,874,901	98.57	+0.20		
Invalid votes	41,618	1.43	−0.20		
Votes cast / turnout	2,916,519	69.42	−4.72		
Abstentions	1,284,632	30.58	+4.72		
Registered voters	4,201,151				

=== April 2019 ===
Summary of the 28 April 2019 Senate of Spain election results in Barcelona
Parties and alliances	Popular vote			Seats	
Parties and alliances	Votes	%	±pp	Total	+/−
Republican Left of Catalonia–Sovereigntists (ERC–Sobiranistes)	2,217,454	25.50	+6.49	2	+1
Socialists' Party of Catalonia (PSC–PSOE)	2,104,286	24.20	+6.86	2	+2
In Common We Can–Let's Win the Change (ECP–Guanyem el Canvi)	1,262,538	14.52	−8.11	0	−3
Together for Catalonia–Together (JxCat–Junts)^{1}	967,380	11.13	−2.29	0	±0
Citizens–Party of the Citizenry (Cs)	896,205	10.31	+1.19	0	±0
People's Party (PP)	546,522	6.29	−7.82	0	±0
Vox (Vox)	247,016	2.84	New	0	±0
Animalist Party Against Mistreatment of Animals (PACMA)	207,023	2.38	−0.54	0	±0
Free People–We Are Alternative–Pirates: Republican Front (Front Republicà)	154,235	1.77	New	0	±0
Zero Cuts–Green Group (Recortes Cero–GV)	24,667	0.28	−0.23	0	±0
Communist Party of the Catalan People (PCPC)	11,786	0.14	+0.01	0	±0
Communist Party of the Workers of Catalonia (PCTC)	9,336	0.11	New	0	±0
Left in Positive (IZQP)	4,955	0.06	New	0	±0
Convergents (CNV)	3,696	0.04	New	0	±0
Blank ballots	38,444	1.26	−0.98		
Total	8,695,543			4	±0
Valid votes	3,047,514	98.37	+0.30		
Invalid votes	50,542	1.63	−0.30		
Votes cast / turnout	3,098,056	74.14	+11.48		
Abstentions	1,080,871	25.86	−11.48		
Registered voters	4,178,927				
Sources
Footnotes: ^{1} Together for Catalonia–Together results are compared to Democratic Convergence of Catalonia totals in the 2016 election.

=== 2016 ===
Summary of the 26 June 2016 Senate of Spain election results in Barcelona
Parties and alliances	Popular vote			Seats	
Parties and alliances	Votes	%	±pp	Total	+/−
In Common We Can–Let's Win the Change (ECP)	1,617,623	22.63	+0.06	3	±0
Republican Left–Catalonia Yes (ERC–CatSí)	1,359,224	19.01	+0.82	1	±0
Socialists' Party of Catalonia (PSC–PSOE)	1,239,753	17.34	+0.49	0	±0
People's Party (PP)	1,008,745	14.11	+2.25	0	±0
Democratic Convergence of Catalonia (CDC)^{1}	959,196	13.42	+0.03	0	±0
Citizens–Party of the Citizenry (C's)	652,123	9.12	−1.51	0	±0
Animalist Party Against Mistreatment of Animals (PACMA)	208,697	2.92	+0.68	0	±0
Zero Cuts–Green Group (Recortes Cero–GV)	36,516	0.51	−0.05	0	±0
Communist Party of the Catalan People (PCPC)	9,625	0.13	−0.33	0	±0
Blank ballots	56,778	2.24	−1.53		
Total	7,148,280			4	±0
Valid votes	2,538,769	98.07	+0.65		
Invalid votes	49,930	1.93	−0.65		
Votes cast / turnout	2,588,699	62.66	−3.71		
Abstentions	1,542,620	37.34	+3.71		
Registered voters	4,131,319				
Sources
Footnotes: ^{1} Democratic Convergence of Catalonia results are compared to Democracy and Freedom totals in the 2015 election.

=== 2015 ===
Summary of the 20 December 2015 Senate of Spain election results in Barcelona
Parties and alliances	Popular vote			Seats	
Parties and alliances	Votes	%	±pp	Total	+/−
In Common We Can (En Comú)^{1}	1,681,065	22.57	n/a	3	+2
Republican Left of Catalonia–Catalonia Yes (ERC–CatSí)	1,354,940	18.19	+11.35	1	+1
Socialists' Party of Catalonia (PSC–PSOE)^{1}	1,254,934	16.85	n/a	0	−2
Democracy and Freedom (DiL)^{2}	997,317	13.39	−13.48	0	−1
People's Party (PP)	883,075	11.86	−9.07	0	±0
Citizens–Party of the Citizenry (C's)	791,471	10.63	New	0	±0
Animalist Party Against Mistreatment of Animals (PACMA)	167,029	2.24	+0.90	0	±0
Democratic Union of Catalonia (unio.cat)	115,597	1.55	New	0	±0
Zero Cuts–Green Group (Recortes Cero–GV)	42,045	0.56	New	0	±0
Communist Party of the Catalan People (PCPC)	34,165	0.46	New	0	±0
Union, Progress and Democracy (UPyD)	24,624	0.33	−0.17	0	±0
Blank ballots	100,574	3.77	−4.03		
Total	7,446,836			4	±0
Valid votes	2,669,274	97.42	+1.51		
Invalid votes	70,667	2.58	−1.51		
Votes cast / turnout	2,739,941	66.37	+2.07		
Abstentions	1,388,240	33.63	−2.07		
Registered voters	4,128,181				
Sources
Footnotes: ^{1} Within the Agreement for Catalonia Progress alliance in the 2011 election. Totals for En Comú are compared to ICV–EUiA.; ^{2} Democracy and Freedom results are compared to Convergence and Union totals in the 2011 election.

=== 2011 ===
Summary of the 20 November 2011 Senate of Spain election results in Barcelona
Parties and alliances	Popular vote			Seats	
Parties and alliances	Votes	%	±pp	Total	+/−
Agreement for Catalonia Progress (PSC–ICV–EUiA)	2,269,148	33.90	−20.85	3	±0
Convergence and Union (CiU)	1,799,088	26.87	+3.55	1	±0
People's Party (PP)	1,401,092	20.93	+6.29	0	±0
Republican Left of Catalonia–Rally–Catalonia Yes (ERC–RI.cat)	458,177	6.84	New	0	±0
Blank Seats (EB)	237,005	3.54	+3.42	0	±0
Platform for Catalonia (PxC)	122,350	1.83	New	0	±0
Animalist Party Against Mistreatment of Animals (PACMA)	89,426	1.34	+0.94	0	±0
Pirates of Catalonia (Pirata.cat)	71,830	1.07	New	0	±0
Union, Progress and Democracy (UPyD)	33,655	0.50	+0.31	0	±0
Communist Unification of Spain (UCE)	18,940	0.28	New	0	±0
Blank ballots	193,715	7.80	+4.88		
Total	6,694,426			4	±0
Valid votes	2,484,025	95.91	−2.31		
Invalid votes	106,024	4.09	+2.31		
Votes cast / turnout	2,590,049	64.30	−6.55		
Abstentions	1,438,068	35.70	+6.55		
Registered voters	4,028,117				

=== 2008 ===
Summary of the 9 March 2008 Senate of Spain election results in Barcelona
Parties and alliances	Popular vote			Seats	
Parties and alliances	Votes	%	±pp	Total	+/−
Catalan Agreement of Progress (PSC–ERC–ICV–EUiA)	4,034,756	54.75	−1.57	3	±0
Convergence and Union (CiU)	1,718,457	23.32	+0.33	1	±0
People's Party (PP)	1,079,000	14.64	−1.25	0	±0
Citizens–Party of the Citizenry (C's)	86,848	1.18	New	0	±0
The Greens–The Ecologist Alternative (EV–AE)	58,725	0.80	−1.40	0	±0
For a Fairer World (PUM+J)	49,092	0.67	New	0	±0
The Greens (EV–LV)	32,600	0.44	New	0	±0
Anti-Bullfighting Party Against Mistreatment of Animals (PACMA)	29,135	0.40	0.12	0	±0
Catalan Republican Party (RC)	28,325	0.38	New	0	±0
The Greens–Green Alternative (EV–AV)	25,527	0.35	New	0	±0
Carlist Traditionalist Communion (CTC)	24,850	0.34	+0.28	0	±0
Pensioners in Action Party (PDLPEA)	22,141	0.30	New	0	±0
Union, Progress and Democracy (UPyD)	14,167	0.19	New	0	±0
Communist Party of the Catalan People (PCPC)	11,888	0.16	−0.08	0	±0
Republican Left–Left Republican Party (IR–PRE)	11,601	0.16	+0.06	0	±0
Unsubmissive Seats–Alternative of Discontented Democrats (Ei–ADD)	8,562	0.12	+0.04	0	±0
Family and Life Party (PFiV)	7,507	0.10	+0.01	0	±0
Humanist Party (PH)	7,099	0.10	−0.03	0	±0
Internationalist Socialist Workers' Party (POSI)	6,555	0.09	−0.22	0	±0
Nation and Revolution (NyR)	5,245	0.07	New	0	±0
Internationalist Struggle (LI (LIT–CI))	4,946	0.07	+0.05	0	±0
Party for Catalonia (PxCat)	4,473	0.06	New	0	±0
Spanish Phalanx of the CNSO (FE–JONS)	4,407	0.06	+0.02	0	±0
National Democracy (DN)	3,891	0.05	+0.02	0	±0
Spanish Alternative (AES)	3,148	0.04	New	0	±0
Social Democratic Party (PSD)	3,068	0.04	New	0	±0
Carlist Party of Catalonia (PCdeC)	1,632	0.02	−0.01	0	±0
Internationalist Solidarity and Self-Management (SAIn)	1,129	0.02	New	0	±0
Spanish Democratic Front (FDE)	459	0.01	New	0	±0
Blank ballots	80,739	2.92	+0.90		
Total	7,369,972			4	±0
Valid votes	2,769,772	98.22	−0.10		
Invalid votes	50,138	1.78	+0.10		
Votes cast / turnout	2,819,910	70.85	−4.91		
Abstentions	1,160,271	29.15	+4.91		
Registered voters	3,980,181				

=== 2004 ===
Summary of the 14 March 2004 Senate of Spain election results in Barcelona
Parties and alliances	Popular vote			Seats	
Parties and alliances	Votes	%	±pp	Total	+/−
Catalan Agreement of Progress (PSC–ERC–ICV–EUiA)	4,660,493	56.32	+14.67	3	±0
Convergence and Union (CiU)	1,902,371	22.99	−5.25	1	±0
People's Party (PP)	1,314,473	15.89	−7.25	0	±0
The Greens–The Ecologist Alternative (EV–AE)	181,702	2.20	New	0	±0
Internationalist Socialist Workers' Party (POSI)	25,326	0.31	−0.34	0	±0
Anti-Bullfighting Party Against Mistreatment of Animals (PACMA)	23,132	0.28	New	0	±0
Communist Party of the Catalan People (PCPC)	19,701	0.24	New	0	±0
Humanist Party (PH)	11,012	0.13	+0.04	0	±0
Another Democracy is Possible (ODeP)	10,894	0.13	New	0	±0
Democratic and Social Centre (CDS)	9,869	0.12	+0.04	0	±0
Republican Left–Left Republican Party (IR–PRE)	8,246	0.10	−0.05	0	±0
Family and Life Party (PFiV)	7,617	0.09	New	0	±0
Spanish Democratic Party (PADE)	6,916	0.08	New	0	±0
Unsubmissive Seats–Alternative of Discontented Democrats (Ei–ADD)	6,854	0.08	New	0	±0
European Nation State (N)	5,982	0.07	+0.05	0	±0
Carlist Traditionalist Communion (CTC)	5,293	0.06	−0.20	0	±0
Spanish Phalanx of the CNSO (FE–JONS)^{1}	3,062	0.04	±0.00	0	±0
National Democracy (DN)	2,765	0.03	New	0	±0
Authentic Phalanx (FA)	2,432	0.03	New	0	±0
Carlist Party of Catalonia (PCdeC)	2,353	0.03	New	0	±0
Caló Nationalist Party (PNCA)	2,052	0.02	New	0	±0
Internationalist Struggle (LI (LIT–CI))	1,767	0.02	±0.00	0	±0
Blank ballots	60,167	2.02	−0.67		
Total	8,274,479			4	±0
Valid votes	2,985,166	98.32	+0.33		
Invalid votes	50,937	1.68	−0.33		
Votes cast / turnout	3,036,103	75.76	+11.99		
Abstentions	971,227	24.24	−11.99		
Registered voters	4,007,330				
Sources
Footnotes: ^{1} Spanish Phalanx of the CNSO results are compared to Independent Spanish Phalanx–Phalanx 2000 totals in the 2000 election.

=== 2000 ===
Summary of the 12 March 2000 Senate of Spain election results in Barcelona
Parties and alliances	Popular vote			Seats	
Parties and alliances	Votes	%	±pp	Total	+/−
Catalan Agreement of Progress (PSC–ERC–IC–V)^{1}	2,879,203	41.65	−10.26	3	±0
Convergence and Union (CiU)	1,952,138	28.24	−0.53	1	±0
People's Party (PP)	1,599,890	23.14	+5.41	0	±0
United and Alternative Left (EUiA)	180,532	2.61	New	0	±0
Internationalist Socialist Workers' Party (POSI)	44,784	0.65	New	0	±0
The Greens–Green Option (EV–GV)	34,601	0.50	New	0	±0
The Greens–Green Alternative (EV–AV)	33.664	0.49	New	0	±0
The Greens–Green Group (EV–GV)	24,677	0.36	New	0	±0
Carlist Traditionalist Communion (CTC)	18,249	0.26	New	0	±0
Catalan State (EC)	13,405	0.19	New	0	±0
Bounced Public Workers (TPR)	12,301	0.18	New	0	±0
Natural Law Party (PLN)	10,648	0.15	New	0	±0
Republican Left–Left Republican Party (IR–PRE)	10,331	0.15	New	0	±0
Liberal Independent Group (GIL)	9,731	0.14	New	0	±0
Humanist Party (PH)	6,080	0.09	New	0	±0
Centrist Union–Democratic and Social Centre (UC–CDS)	5,570	0.08	−0.04	0	±0
Valencian Union (UV)	4,057	0.06	+0.05	0	±0
Independent Spanish Phalanx–Phalanx 2000 (FEI–FE 2000)	2,582	0.04	New	0	±0
European Nation State (N)	1,601	0.02	+0.01	0	±0
Internationalist Struggle (LI (LIT–CI))	1,196	0.02	New	0	±0
Blank ballots	67,677	2.69	+1.21		
Total	6,912,917			4	±0
Valid votes	2,520,347	97.99	−0.36		
Invalid votes	51,648	2.01	+0.36		
Votes cast / turnout	2,571,995	63.77	−12.74		
Abstentions	1,461,022	36.23	+12.74		
Registered voters	4,033,017				
Sources
Footnotes: ^{1} Catalan Agreement of Progress results are compared to the combined totals of Socialists' Party of Catalonia, Initiative for Catalonia–The Greens and Republican Left of Catalonia in the 1996 election.

=== 1996 ===
Summary of the 3 March 1996 Senate of Spain election results in Barcelona
Parties and alliances	Popular vote			Seats	
Parties and alliances	Votes	%	±pp	Total	+/−
Socialists' Party of Catalonia (PSC–PSOE)	3,242,163	39.16	+2.81	3	±0
Convergence and Union (CiU)	2,381,527	28.77	−3.40	1	±0
People's Party (PP)	1,467,475	17.73	+1.63	0	±0
Initiative for Catalonia–The Greens (IC–EV)	713,697	8.62	−0.20	0	±0
Republican Left of Catalonia (ERC)	342,106	4.13	+2.11	0	±0
Ecologist Party of Catalonia (PEC)	24,662	0.30	−0.28	0	±0
The European Greens–Ecologist Alternative of Catalonia (EVE–AEC)^{1}	14,953	0.18	−1.55	0	±0
Alliance for National Unity (AUN)	14,652	0.18	New	0	±0
Centrist Union (UC)	9,945	0.12	−0.66	0	±0
Democratic Party of the People (PDEP)	5,760	0.07	New	0	±0
Workers' Revolutionary Party (PRT)^{2}	4,586	0.06	−0.28	0	±0
Independent Spanish Phalanx (FEI)	2,961	0.04	New	0	±0
Citizen Independent Platform of Catalonia (PICC)	2,677	0.03	New	0	±0
Authentic Spanish Phalanx (FEA)	2,082	0.03	−0.01	0	±0
Salamanca–Zamora–León–PREPAL (PREPAL)	1,872	0.02	−0.01	0	±0
Republican Coalition (CR)^{3}	1,714	0.02	±0.00	0	±0
Valencian Union (UV)	1,167	0.01	±0.00	0	±0
European Nation State (N)	816	0.01	New	0	±0
Revolutionary Workers' Party (POR)	574	0.01	−0.07	0	±0
Blank ballots	43,563	1.48	+0.12		
Total	8,278,952			4	±0
Valid votes	2,938,804	98.35	−0.07		
Invalid votes	49,211	1.65	+0.07		
Votes cast / turnout	2,988,015	76.51	+0.67		
Abstentions	917,240	23.49	−0.67		
Registered voters	3,905,255				
Sources
Footnotes: ^{1} The European Greens–Ecologist Alternative of Catalonia results are compared to The Greens–Ecologist Confederation of Catalonia totals in the 1993 election.; ^{2} Workers' Revolutionary Party results are compared to Workers' Socialist Party totals in the 1993 election.; ^{3} Republican Coalition results are compared to Coalition for a New Socialist Party totals in the 1993 election.

=== 1993 ===
Summary of the 6 June 1993 Senate of Spain election results in Barcelona
Parties and alliances	Popular vote			Seats	
Parties and alliances	Votes	%	±pp	Total	+/−
Socialists' Party of Catalonia (PSC–PSOE)	2,865,199	36.35	−0.76	3	±0
Convergence and Union (CiU)	2,536,116	32.17	+0.83	1	±0
People's Party (PP)	1,269,462	16.10	+6.31	0	±0
Initiative for Catalonia (IC)	695,119	8.82	+1.08	0	±0
Republican Left of Catalonia (ERC)	159,329	2.02	−0.49	0	±0
The Greens–Ecologist Confederation of Catalonia (EV–CEC)^{1}	135,973	1.73	+0.35	0	±0
Democratic and Social Centre (CDS)	61,751	0.78	−3.64	0	±0
Ecologist Party of Catalonia–VERDE (PEC–VERDE)	45,422	0.58	+0.06	0	±0
Workers' Socialist Party (PST)	27,079	0.34	+0.01	0	±0
Ruiz-Mateos Group–European Democratic Alliance (ARM–ADE)	26,317	0.33	−0.97	0	±0
Revolutionary Workers' Party (POR)	6,496	0.08	+0.03	0	±0
Spanish Phalanx of the CNSO (FE–JONS)	4,175	0.05	−0.04	0	±0
Authentic Spanish Phalanx (FEA)	3,408	0.04	New	0	±0
Spanish Catholic Movement (MCE)	3,053	0.04	New	0	±0
Regionalist Party of the Leonese Country (PREPAL)	2,541	0.03	New	0	±0
Coalition for a New Socialist Party (CNPS)^{2}	1,801	0.02	−0.02	0	±0
Valencian Union (UV)	1,047	0.01	New	0	±0
Communist Unification of Spain (UCE)	0	0.00	New	0	±0
Blank ballots	38,136	1.36	−0.24		
Total	7,882,424			4	±0
Valid votes	2,800,651	98.42	+1.60		
Invalid votes	45,044	1.58	−1.60		
Votes cast / turnout	2,845,695	75.84	+8.40		
Abstentions	906,766	24.16	−8.40		
Registered voters	3,752,461				
Sources
Footnotes: ^{1} The Greens–Ecologist Confederation of Catalonia results are compared to the combined totals of Green Alternative–Ecologist Movement of Catalonia and The Greens–Green List in the 1989 election.; ^{2} Coalition for a New Socialist Party results are compared to Alliance for the Republic totals in the 1989 election.

=== 1989 ===
Summary of the 29 October 1989 Senate of Spain election results in Barcelona
Parties and alliances	Popular vote			Seats	
Parties and alliances	Votes	%	±pp	Total	+/−
Socialists' Party of Catalonia (PSC–PSOE)	2,491,024	37.11	−6.26	3	±0
Convergence and Union (CiU)	2,103,431	31.34	+0.20	1	±0
People's Party (PP)^{1}	657,444	9.79	+0.34	0	±0
Initiative for Catalonia (IC)^{2}	519,336	7.74	+3.20	0	±0
Democratic and Social Centre (CDS)	296,557	4.42	+0.57	0	±0
Republican Left of Catalonia (ERC)	168,513	2.51	−0.26	0	±0
Ruiz-Mateos Group (Ruiz-Mateos)	87,074	1.30	New	0	±0
Party of the Communists of Catalonia (PCC)	82,444	1.23	−0.71	0	±0
The Ecologist Greens (EVE)	73,224	1.09	New	0	±0
Green Alternative–Ecologist Movement of Catalonia (AV–MEC)^{3}	69,079	1.03	+0.63	0	±0
Ecologist Party of Catalonia–VERDE (PEC–VERDE)	35,006	0.52	−0.39	0	±0
Workers' Party of Spain–Communist Unity (PTE–UC)^{4}	24,838	0.37	−0.31	0	±0
The Greens–Green List (EV–LV)	23,527	0.35	New	0	±0
Workers' Socialist Party (PST)	22,317	0.33	New	0	±0
Spanish Phalanx of the CNSO (FE–JONS)	6,203	0.09	−0.13	0	±0
Humanist Party of Catalonia (PHC)	3,667	0.05	New	0	±0
Centrist Unity–Democratic Spanish Party (PED)	3,215	0.05	New	0	±0
Revolutionary Workers' Party of Spain (PORE)	3,045	0.05	−0.06	0	±0
Alliance for the Republic (AxR)^{5}	2,931	0.04	±0.00	0	±0
Social Democratic Coalition (CSD)^{6}	1,771	0.03	−0.01	0	±0
Blank ballots	37,801	1.60	+0.37		
Total	6,712,447			4	±0
Valid votes	2,362,607	96.82	−0.23		
Invalid votes	77,475	3.18	+0.23		
Votes cast / turnout	2,440,082	67.44	−1.09		
Abstentions	1,177,866	32.56	+1.09		
Registered voters	3,617,948				
Sources
Footnotes: ^{1} People's Party results are compared to People's Coalition totals in the 1986 election.; ^{2} Initiative for Catalonia results are compared to Union of the Catalan Left totals in the 1986 election.; ^{3} Green Alternative–Ecologist Movement of Catalonia results are compared to Green Alternative List totals in the 1986 election.; ^{4} Workers' Party of Spain–Communist Unity results are compared to Communists' Unity Board totals in the 1986 election.; ^{5} Alliance for the Republic results are compared to Internationalist Socialist Workers' Party totals in the 1986 election.; ^{6} Social Democratic Coalition results are compared to Social Democratic Party of Catalonia totals in the 1986 election.

=== 1986 ===
Summary of the 22 June 1986 Senate of Spain election results in Barcelona
Parties and alliances	Popular vote			Seats	
Parties and alliances	Votes	%	±pp	Total	+/−
Socialists' Party of Catalonia (PSC–PSOE)	2,950,062	43.37	−2.90	3	±0
Convergence and Union (CiU)^{1}	2,118,156	31.14	n/a	1	+1
People's Coalition (AP–PDP–PL)^{2}	642,893	9.45	−3.40	0	±0
Union of the Catalan Left (PSUC–ENE)^{3}	308,785	4.54	−2.13	0	±0
Democratic and Social Centre (CDS)	261,597	3.85	+1.91	0	±0
Republican Left of Catalonia (ERC)^{1}	188,396	2.77	n/a	0	−1
Party of the Communists of Catalonia (PCC)	131,743	1.94	−0.32	0	±0
Ecologist Party of Catalonia–VERDE (PEC–VERDE)	62,164	0.91	New	0	±0
Communists' Unity Board (MUC)	46,056	0.68	New	0	±0
Green Alternative List (LAV)	27,151	0.40	New	0	±0
Spanish Phalanx of the CNSO (FE–JONS)	14,776	0.22	+0.22	0	±0
Revolutionary Workers' Party of Spain (PORE)	7,361	0.11	New	0	±0
Republican Popular Unity (UPR)	3,084	0.05	New	0	±0
Communist Unification of Spain (UCE)	2,996	0.04	New	0	±0
Internationalist Socialist Workers' Party (POSI)	2,864	0.04	New	0	±0
Social Democratic Party of Catalonia (PSDC)	2,854	0.04	New	0	±0
Proverist Party (PPr)	1,423	0.02	New	0	±0
Blank ballots	29,336	1.23	−0.70		
Total	6,801,697			4	±0
Valid votes	2,378,553	97.05	+0.07		
Invalid votes	72,204	2.95	−0.07		
Votes cast / turnout	2,450,757	68.53	−8.75		
Abstentions	1,125,647	31.47	+8.75		
Registered voters	3,576,404				
Sources
Footnotes: ^{1} Within the Catalonia in the Senate alliance in the 1982 election.; ^{2} People's Coalition results are compared to People's Alliance–People's Democratic Party totals in the 1982 election.; ^{3} Union of the Catalan Left results are compared to the combined totals of Unified Socialist Party of Catalonia and Left Nationalists in the 1982 election.

=== 1983 by-election ===
Summary of the 8 May 1983 Senate of Spain by-election results in Barcelona
Parties and alliances	Popular vote			Seats	
Parties and alliances	Votes	%	±pp	Total	+/−
Socialists' Party of Catalonia (PSC–PSOE)	979,121	45.06	−1.21	1	±0
Catalonia in the Senate (CiU–ERC)	515,776	23.74	−0.60	0	±0
Unified Socialist Party of Catalonia (PSUC–PCE)	239,599	11.03	+5.30	0	±0
People's Coalition (AP–PDP–UL)^{1}	217,424	10.01	−2.84	0	±0
Party of the Communists of Catalonia (PCC)	67,140	3.09	+0.83	0	±0
Democratic and Social Centre (CDS)	38,168	1.76	−0.18	0	±0
Conservatives of Catalonia (CiC)	25,217	1.16	New	0	±0
Ecologist Movement of Catalonia (MEC)	17,196	0.79	New	0	±0
Spanish Vertex Ecological Development Revindication (VERDE)	11,634	0.54	New	0	±0
Revolutionary Communist League (LCR)^{2}	10,724	0.49	+0.13	0	±0
Blank ballots	51,005	2.35	+0.42		
Total	2,173,004			1	±0
Valid votes	2,173,004	96.67	−0.31		
Invalid votes	74,884	3.33	+0.31		
Votes cast / turnout	2,247,888	65.89	−11.39		
Abstentions	1,163,571	34.11	+11.39		
Registered voters	3,411,459				
Sources
Footnotes: ^{1} People's Coalition results are compared to People's Alliance–People's Democratic Party totals in the 1982 election.; ^{2} Revolutionary Communist League results are compared to Communist Front of Catalonia totals in the 1982 election.

=== 1982 ===
Summary of the 28 October 1982 Senate of Spain election results in Barcelona
Parties and alliances	Popular vote			Seats	
Parties and alliances	Votes	%	±pp	Total	+/−
Socialists' Party of Catalonia (PSC–PSOE)^{1}	3,421,528	46.27	n/a	3	+1
Catalonia in the Senate (CiU–ERC)^{2}	1,799,873	24.34	+8.47	1	±0
People's Alliance–People's Democratic Party (AP–PDP)^{3}	950,258	12.85	+9.73	0	±0
Unified Socialist Party of Catalonia (PSUC–PCE)^{4}	423,750	5.73	n/a	0	−1
Party of the Communists of Catalonia (PCC)	166,844	2.26	New	0	±0
Democratic and Social Centre (CDS)	143,111	1.94	New	0	±0
Centrists of Catalonia (CC–UCD)	135,150	1.83	−13.38	0	±0
Workers' Socialist Party (PST)	70,109	0.95	New	0	±0
Natural Culture (CN)	69,741	0.94	New	0	±0
Left Nationalists (NE)	69,602	0.94	New	0	±0
New Force (FN)^{5}	31,353	0.42	−0.48	0	±0
Communist Front of Catalonia (FCC)^{6}	26,750	0.36	−0.35	0	±0
Spanish Solidarity (SE)	23,054	0.31	New	0	±0
Democratic Party of the People (PDEP)	14,939	0.20	New	0	±0
Socialist Party (PS)	0	0.00	New	0	±0
Spanish Phalanx of the CNSO (FE–JONS)	0	0.00	New	0	±0
Blank ballots	48,191	1.93	−0.35		
Total	7,394,253			4	±0
Valid votes	2,496,877	96.98	+0.33		
Invalid votes	77,672	3.02	−0.33		
Votes cast / turnout	2,574,549	77.28	+10.12		
Abstentions	757,062	22.72	−10.12		
Registered voters	3,331,611				
Sources
Footnotes: ^{1} Within the New Agreement alliance in the 1979 election.; ^{2} Catalonia in the Senate results are compared to Convergence and Union totals in the 1979 election, including Republican Left of Catalonia seat totals within the New Agreement alliance.; ^{3} People's Alliance–People's Democratic Party results are compared to Democratic Coalition totals in the 1979 election.; ^{4} Within the For the Agreement alliance in the 1979 election.; ^{5} New Force results are compared to National Union totals in the 1979 election.; ^{6} Communist Front of Catalonia results are compared to Revolutionary Communist League totals in the 1979 election.

=== 1979 ===
Summary of the 1 March 1979 Senate of Spain election results in Barcelona
Parties and alliances	Popular vote			Seats	
Parties and alliances	Votes	%	±pp	Total	+/−
New Agreement (PSC–ERC)^{1}	2,121,239	32.76	n/a	3	+2
For the Agreement (PSUC–PTC)^{1}	1,597,315	24.67	n/a	1	−1
Convergence and Union (CiU)^{2}	1,027,900	15.87	+3.16	0	±0
Centrists of Catalonia (CC–UCD)^{3}	984,687	15.21	+2.66	0	±0
Democratic Coalition (CD)^{4}	201,783	3.12	−1.19	0	±0
Republican Left (IR)	94,413	1.46	New	0	±0
Communist Movement–Organization of Communist Left (MC–OIC)	72,480	1.12	New	0	±0
National Union (UN)^{5}	58,027	0.90	+0.21	0	±0
Left Bloc for National Liberation (BEAN)	48,208	0.74	New	0	±0
Revolutionary Communist League (LCR)	46,029	0.71	New	0	±0
Pro-Austerity Policy Political Party (PIPPA)	36,280	0.56	New	0	±0
Workers' Revolutionary Organization (ORT)	29,738	0.46	New	0	±0
Social Christian Democracy of Catalonia (DSCC)	29,367	0.45	New	0	±0
Communist Organization of Spain (Red Flag) (OCE–BR)	26,793	0.41	New	0	±0
Spanish Phalanx of the CNSO (Authentic) (FE–JONS(A))	25,463	0.39	New	0	±0
Liberal Party of Catalonia (PLC)	19,082	0.29	New	0	±0
Spanish Phalanx–Falangist Unity (FE–UF)	5,072	0.08	New	0	±0
Xirinacs Electoral Group (AE Xirinacs)	n/a	n/a	−8.04	0	−1
Blank ballots	51,215	2.28			
Total	6,475,091			4	±0
Valid votes	2,249,883	96.65			
Invalid votes	78,096	3.35			
Votes cast / turnout	2,327,979	67.16			
Abstentions	1,138,554	32.84			
Registered voters	3,466,533				
Sources
Footnotes: ^{1} Within the Agreement of the Catalans alliance in the 1977 election.; ^{2} Convergence and Union results are compared to Democracy and Catalonia totals in the 1977 election.; ^{3} Centrists of Catalonia results are compared to Union of the Democratic Centre totals in the 1977 election.; ^{4} Democratic Coalition results are compared to Catalan Coexistence–People's Alliance totals in the 1977 election.; ^{5} National Union results are compared to National Alliance July 18 totals in the 1977 election.

=== 1977 ===
Summary of the 15 June 1977 Senate of Spain election results in Barcelona
Parties and alliances	Popular vote			Seats	
Parties and alliances	Votes	%	±pp	Total	+/−
Agreement of the Catalans (Entesa)	3,790,532	55.34	n/a	3	n/a
Democracy and Catalonia (DiC)	870,882	12.71	n/a	0	n/a
Union of the Democratic Centre (UCD)	859,993	12.55	n/a	0	n/a
Xirinacs Electoral Group (AE Xirinacs)	550,678	8.04	n/a	1	n/a
Independent (INDEP)	355,479	5.19	n/a	0	n/a
Catalan Coexistence–People's Alliance (CC–AP)	295,236	4.31	n/a	0	n/a
League of Catalonia–Catalan Liberal Party (LC–PLC)	79,931	1.17	n/a	0	n/a
National Alliance July 18 (AN18)	47,306	0.69	n/a	0	n/a
Blank ballots			n/a		
Total	6,850,037			4	n/a
Valid votes			n/a		
Invalid votes			n/a		
Votes cast / turnout			n/a		
Abstentions			n/a		
Registered voters	3,004,988				

== Bibliography ==
- Ley 1/1977, de 4 de enero, para la Reforma Política (Fundamental Law 1/1977). Official State Gazette (in Spanish). 4 January 1977. BOE-A-1977-165.
- Real Decreto-ley 20/1977, de 18 de marzo, sobre Normas Electorales (Royal Decree-Law 20/1977). Official State Gazette (in Spanish). 18 March 1977. BOE-A-1977-7445.
- Constitución Española (Constitution). Official State Gazette (in Spanish). 27 December 1978. BOE-A-1978-31229.
- Ley Orgánica 5/1985, de 19 de junio, del Régimen Electoral General (Organic Law 5/1985). Official State Gazette (in Spanish). 19 June 1985. BOE-A-1985-11672.
- Carreras de Odriozola, Albert; Tafunell Sambola, Xavier (2005) [1989]. Estadísticas históricas de España, siglos XIX-XX (PDF) (in Spanish). Vol. 1 (II ed.). Bilbao: Fundación BBVA. pp. 1072–1097. ISBN 84-96515-00-1. Archived from the original (PDF) on 24 September 2015.
