= Entesa =

Entesa (English: "Agreement") may refer to one of the following political parties or alliances:

- Entesa Catalana de Progrés, electoral alliance of the PSC, ERC and ICV–EUiA for the 2000, 2004 and 2008 Spanish Senate elections in Catalonia.
- Entesa d'Eivissa, political party in Ibiza.
- Entesa de l'Esquerra de Menorca, electoral alliance of the Socialist Party of Menorca and Esquerra de Menorca for the 1987 and 1991 Balearic regional elections in Menorca.
- Entesa dels Catalans, electoral alliance of the PSC–C, FSC, PSUC, ERC and Estat Català for the 1977 Spanish Senate election in Catalonia.
- Entesa dels Nacionalistes d'Esquerra, political party in Catalonia between 1985 and 1987.
- Entesa pel Progrés de Catalunya, electoral alliance of the PSC and ICV–EUiA for the 2011 Spanish Senate election in Catalonia.
- Entesa per Mallorca, political party in Majorca that existed between 2006 and 2013.
- Esquerra Unida–L'Entesa, electoral alliance of EUPV, IR, EV, EVPV and EV–EE for the 2003 Valencian, 2004 Spanish and 2004 European Parliament elections in the Valencian Community.
- Nova Entesa, electoral alliance of the PSC and ERC for the 1979 Spanish Senate election in Catalonia.
- Per l'Entesa, electoral alliance of the PSUC and PTC for the 1979 Spanish Senate election in Catalonia.
- PSM–Entesa Nacionalista, political party in the Balearic Islands.
