= Maribel Moreno =

Maribel Moreno may refer to:

- María Isabel Moreno Allue ("Maribel", born 1981), Spanish road bicycle racer
- María Isabel Moreno Duque ("Maribel", born 1970), Spanish politician

== See also ==
- Maria Moreno (disambiguation)
