= Liberal Citizens Action =

Liberal Citizens Action Acción Ciudadana Liberal
- Abbreviation: ACL
- President: José María de Areilza
- Founded: September 27, 1977
- Dissolved: January 20, 1979
- Merger of: Liberal Party; Liberal Progressive Party; Galician Democratic Party
- Succeeded by: People's Alliance
- Ideology: Liberalism
- Political position: Centre-right
- Colors: Orange

Liberal Citizens Action (Spanish: Acción Ciudadana Liberal; ACL) was a political party in Spain at the time of its transition to democracy. ACL emerged from the Liberal Federation (Spanish: Federación Liberal), an alliance of five parties, in 1977. The president of the party was José María de Areilza, Minister of Foreign Affairs from 1975 to 1976. Areilza had left Adolfo Suarez's Union of the Democratic Centre (UCD).

In the 1979 elections ACL was part of the Democratic Coalition, together with Manuel Fraga's People's Alliance (AP). Areilza was elected deputy in Madrid.

Shortly afterwards, ACL merged with the AP.

== Electoral performance ==
=== Cortes Generales ===
Cortes Generales
Election	Leading candidate	Congress			Senate			Gov.
Election	Leading candidate	Votes	%	Seats	Votes	%	Seats	Gov.
1979	Manuel Fraga	Within CD		2 / 350	Within CD		0 / 208	(Note: Confidence and supply (1979–1980).)
1979	Manuel Fraga	Within CD		2 / 350	Within CD		0 / 208	No (Note: 1980–1982.)
