= Félix Ortega Fernández =

Spanish politician

Felix Ortega Fernandez

Senator of the Cortes Generales
- Incumbent
- Assumed office 10 November 2019

Senator of the Cortes Generales
- In office 13 January 2016 – 28 April 2019

Personal details
- Born: 25 February 1972 (age 54) Cuenca, Spain
- Citizenship: Spain
- Party: Spanish Socialist Workers' Party

Félix Ortega Fernández (born 25 February 1972 in Cuenca, Spain) is a Spanish politician and senator. He is the senator representing the Toledo constituency in Spain. He was elected Senator on 20 December 2015, and sworn into office 26 June 2016. Fernández was elected through the Spanish Socialist Workers' Party. On 10 November 2019, he was re-elected for a second term as senator.

He is the Vice-chairman of the senate committee on Business and Economy in the Senate of Spain.
