= Alfonso Osorio =

Spanish politician (1923–2018)

Alfonso Osorio García (13 December 1923 – 27 August 2018) was a Spanish politician.

Born in Santander on 13 December 1923, Osorio studied law at the University of Oviedo. He joined the State Lawyers Corps in 1953, serving in Cuenca and Toledo. He later joined the Legal Service of the Spanish Air Force. He was also a member of the Francoist Cortes and took several business administration positions. Osorio was named Minister of the Presidency and Second Vice President under Carlos Arias Navarro and retained his position under Adolfo Suárez, as was his very close aide during the hard times of the Transition. Osorio was appointed to the Senate from 1977 to 1979. After leaving the Suárez government and the Union of the Democratic Centre, Osorio led the Progressive Democratic Party until his resignation in September 1979. He subsequently joined the People's Alliance and represented Madrid in the Congress of Deputies until 1986, and Cantabria until 1989. Upon stepping down from the legislature, Osorio withdrew from the People's Alliance and quit politics. Osorio died on 27 August 2018, at the age of 94 in his hometown of Santander.

Osorio was married to María Teresa Iturmendi Gómez-Nales, daughter of Antonio Iturmendi Bañales. They had three children.
