= Maria Moreno =

Maria Moreno may refer to:

- María Moreño (born 1952), Salvadoran swimmer
- María Isabel Moreno (born 1981), Spanish road bicycle racer
- María Isabel Moreno Duque (born 1970), Spanish politician
- Maria Moreno (activist) (1920–1988), American farmworker and labor organizer
- María Moreno (painter) (1933–2020), Spanish painter, wife of Antonio López García
- María Moreno (writer) (born 1947), Argentine writer
- María José Moreno (born 1967), Spanish singer
