= Conservatives of Catalonia =

Conservatives of Catalonia Conservadors de Catalunya
- President: Juan Parra Balcells
- Founded: January 30, 1980
- Dissolved: c. 1982
- Headquarters: C/ Balmes, 197.8o.3o., Barcelona
- Ideology: Conservatism; Liberalism
- Political position: Right-wing

Conservatives of Catalonia (Catalan: Conservadors de Catalunya, CiC) was a Spanish political party of Catalan scope directed by Juan Parra Balcells -an independent candidate to the Senate of Spain in the general elections of 1977 and who had been one of the founders of the Progressive Democratic Party- and Santiago Brutau Cirera, who acted as vice president of the party. It was officially registered before the Spanish Ministry of the Interior on January 30, 1980.

It was a conservative, nationalist and liberal party, which was presented to the elections of the Parliament of Catalonia in 1980 and obtained 4095 votes (0.15% votes). It also appeared in the general election of 1982, where it obtained 2596 votes.

== Electoral program in the 1980 election ==
- Defense of Christian values.
- Maintenance and defense of Catalan culture.
- Defense of the integrity of Spain and the uniqueness of the peoples that make it up.
- Maintenance of the free enterprise system.
- Nationalization of public services necessary for national operation.
