= Opinion polling for the 1979 Spanish general election =

In the run up to the 1979 Spanish general election, various organisations carried out opinion polling to gauge voting intention in Spain during the term of the Constituent Cortes Generales. Results of such polls are displayed in this article. The date range for these opinion polls is from the previous general election, held on 15 June 1977, to the day the next election was held, on 1 March 1979.

Voting intention estimates refer mainly to a hypothetical Congress of Deputies election. Polls are listed in reverse chronological order, showing the most recent first and using the dates when the survey fieldwork was done, as opposed to the date of publication. Where the fieldwork dates are unknown, the date of publication is given instead. The highest percentage figure in each polling survey is displayed with its background shaded in the leading party's colour. If a tie ensues, this is applied to the figures with the highest percentages. The "Lead" columns on the right shows the percentage-point difference between the parties with the highest percentages in a poll.

== Electoral polling ==
=== Nationwide polling ===
==== Voting intention estimates ====
The table below lists nationwide voting intention estimates. Refusals are generally excluded from the party vote percentages, while question wording and the treatment of "don't know" responses and those not intending to vote may vary between polling organisations. When available, seat projections determined by the polling organisations are displayed below (or in place of) the percentages in a smaller font; 176 seats were required for an absolute majority in the Congress of Deputies.

Color key:

Exit poll

Polling firm/Commissioner	Fieldwork date	Sample size	Turnout	UCD	PSOE	PCE	CD	PSP	CiU	PNV	UN	Lead
1979 general election	1 Mar 1979	—N/a	68.0	34.8; 168	30.4; 121	10.8; 23	6.1; 9	(Note: Within PSOE.)	2.7; 8	1.6; 7	2.1; 1	4.4
Government	1 Mar 1979	?	?	34.6; 168/172	29.8; 114/118	10.8; 25	5.5; 8		2.6; 10	1.6; 8	2.0; 1	4.8
SFGPP/Ya	26 Feb 1979	16,817	?	33.1; 166	31.9; 132	8.2; 25	6.3; 7		–	? 8	–	1.2
Sofemasa/El País (Note: Undecided and/or abstentionists excluded.)	19–21 Feb 1979	16,869	77.7	32.9; 153	35.0; 140	11.0; 22	6.3; 9		1.8; 5	1.7; 7	2.3; 2	2.1
PSOE	18 Feb 1979	?	65	28.0– 32.0	31.0– 35.0	–	–		–	–	–	3.0
Equipo Eidos/Europa Press	12–14 Feb 1979	3,700	?	34.0; 167	32.0; 132	12.0; 21	7.0; 14		2.9; 7	1.6; 7	–	2.0
RNC/ABC	7 Feb 1979	2,999	73	30.6	32.3	12.9	11.3		–	2.7	–	1.7
PSOE	1 Feb 1979	?	65	27.0– 32.0	32.0– 37.0	–	–		–	–	–	5.0
Sofemasa/El País	30–31 Jan 1979	2,000	?	30.6	33.5	9.3	3.7		–	–	1.8	2.9
ICSA–Gallup/El Periódico	2–29 Nov 1978	2,200	?	27.3	38.7	10.8	3.8		–	–	–	11.4
Sofemasa/El País	9–11 Jun 1978	2,000	?	28.5	33.6	9.7	7.1		–	–	–	5.1
Diario 16	10 Mar 1978	?	79	29.0– 31.0	38.0– 40.0	6.0– 8.0	6.0– 8.0	6.0– 8.0	–	–	–	9.0
1977 general election	15 Jun 1977	—N/a	78.8	34.4; 165	29.3; 118	9.3; 20	8.3; 16	4.5; 6	2.8; 11	1.6; 8	0.5; 0	5.1

==== Voting preferences ====
The table below lists raw, unweighted voting preferences.

Polling firm/Commissioner	Fieldwork date	Sample size	UCD	PSOE	PCE	CD	PSP	CiU	PNV	UN	Question	☒	Lead
1979 general election	1 Mar 1979	—N/a	23.4	20.4	7.2	4.1		1.8	1.1	1.4	—N/a	32.0	4.4
Sofemasa/El País	19–21 Feb 1979	16,869	21.5	22.9	7.2	3.3		1.2	1.1	1.5	23.2	11.4	1.4
Cambio 16	20 Feb 1979	1,534	20.0	20.0	8.0	3.0		–	–	–	–	7.0	Tie
CIS	1–10 Feb 1979	24,395	14.6	14.0	4.4	2.2		0.6	1.0	0.6	54.2	4.3	0.6
RNC/ABC	7 Feb 1979	2,999	19.0	20.0	8.0	7.0		–	1.7	–	38.0		1.0
ICSA–Gallup/ABC	7 Feb 1979	2,600	19.0	29.0	6.0	8.0		(Note: Within UCD.)	–	1.0	30.0		10.0
CIS	25 Jan–3 Feb 1979	25,516	14.3	14.5	4.4	2.0		0.7	0.8	0.5	55.7	4.2	0.2
Sofemasa/El País	30–31 Jan 1979	2,000	18.4	21.0	5.9	2.3		–	–	1.1	32.3	8.8	2.6
CIS	19–22 Jan 1979	1,188	18.5	17.5	3.1	2.6		0.5	0.8	–	50.2	3.1	1.0
CIS	1 Jan 1979	1,170	18.0	16.0	4.0	3.0		1.0	0.0	–	51.0	4.0	2.0
CIS	17–19 Dec 1978	1,188	24.0	28.0	6.0	3.0		1.0	2.0	–	18.0	13.0	4.0
CIS	10–12 Dec 1978	987	23.5	19.4	4.0	3.3		0.7	0.4	–	41.7	2.2	4.1
CIS	1 Dec 1978	1,196	21.2	19.5	4.4	4.7		0.8	0.8	–	39.8	3.5	1.7
CIS	20–23 Nov 1978	1,166	18.7	18.8	4.2	2.7		0.6	1.5	–	45.2	4.2	0.1
CIS	13–16 Nov 1978	1,183	18.4	19.5	3.7	2.0		0.3	0.7	–	46.5	4.6	1.1
CIS	6–9 Nov 1978	1,189	20.4	18.3	3.8	2.4		1.2	1.3	–	42.5	4.9	2.1
CIS	1 Nov 1978	5,716	18.0	20.0	4.0	3.0		1.0	0.0	–	46.0	5.0	2.0
CIS	23–26 Oct 1978	1,169	17.2	19.2	4.1	3.9		0.3	1.5	–	42.4	8.0	2.0
CIS	16–18 Oct 1978	1,190	20.2	17.5	4.2	3.7		1.6	1.4	–	37.2	9.3	2.7
CIS	9–11 Oct 1978	1,196	19.2	21.0	4.9	3.1		0.1	0.8	–	40.8	7.4	1.8
CIS	27–30 Sep 1978	1,184	16.3	19.3	4.9	3.9		0.8	0.8	–	40.3	9.2	3.0
CIS	18–26 Sep 1978	1,216	13.8	27.2	9.4	5.3		1.9	1.6	–	22.8	12.4	13.4
CIS	24–26 Jul 1978	1,181	20.1	24.7	6.4	3.3		0.8	1.4	–	25.0	13.8	4.6
CIS	10–12 Jul 1978	5,350	15.2	22.5	6.2	5.0		–	1.1	–	39.4	6.2	3.0
CIS	1 Jul 1978	1,199	17.0	31.0	7.0	3.0		2.0	1.0	–	24.0	10.0	14.0
ICSA–Gallup/Informaciones	1–16 Feb 1978	2,035	17.2	27.8	4.9	2.9	5.7	2.2	1.0	–	33.6		10.6
CIS	1 Jan 1978	5,653	19.0	20.0	6.0	3.0	3.0	0.0	1.0	–	36.0	8.0	1.0
ICSA–Gallup/Informaciones	1–16 Dec 1977	2,037	17.8	28.2	6.1	3.4	5.0	1.6	1.5	–	30.2		10.4
ICSA–Gallup/Informaciones	18 Nov 1977	2,134	18.2	30.5	5.8	3.1	5.7	3.0	2.0	–	26.5		12.3
ICSA–Gallup/Diario 16	17–29 Oct 1977	2,134	17.0	32.4	6.6	3.1	6.0	2.9	1.7	0.4	24.3		15.4
ICSA–Gallup/Informaciones	3–14 Oct 1977	1,944	17.3	31.4	6.3	3.0	6.1	2.9	1.9	–	25.4		14.1
CIS	17–18 Sep 1977	1,554	24.0	24.0	6.0	5.0	5.0	1.0	–	–	31.0		Tie
1977 general election	15 Jun 1977	—N/a	26.8	22.8	7.3	6.4	3.5	2.2	1.3	0.4	—N/a	21.2	4.0
