= Liberal Progressive Party (Spain) =

Defunct political party in Spain

Liberal Progressive Party Partido Progresista Liberal
- Abbreviation: PPL
- President: Juan García Madariaga
- Founded: 1976
- Dissolved: 20 April 1978
- Merged into: UCD
- Political position: Centre-right
- National affiliation: UCD (1977)

The Liberal Progressive Party (Spanish: Partido Progresista Liberal; PPL) was a Spanish political party of centre-right, founded in 1976 and directed by Juan García de Madariaga and Jaime Santafé Mira.

On 18 April 1977 the party decided to contest in the Spanish general election under the Union of the Democratic Centre coalition, however on 30 September that year it separated from that group. Subsequently, on 15 December 1977, it became part of the Liberal Federation along with the Independent Liberal Party, the Liberal Party, the Galician Democratic Party, and the People's Party of Catalonia.

In April 1978 it merged with other liberal parties in the Liberal Citizens Action, headed by José María de Areilza.
