= Progressive Democratic Party (Spain) =

Progressive Democratic Party Partido Demócrata Progresista
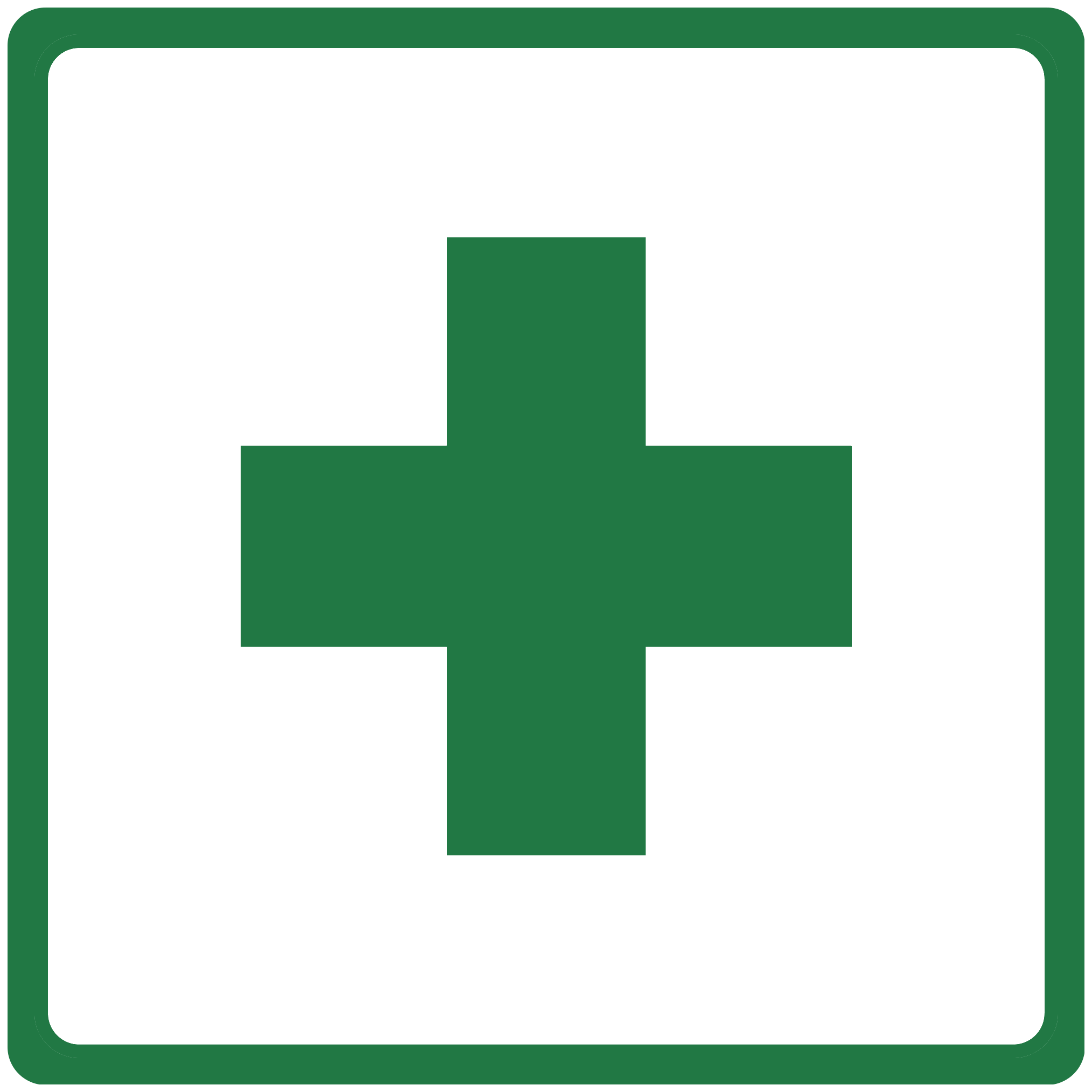
- Abbreviation: PDP
- Leader: Alfonso Osorio; Ignacio Camuñas Solís
- Founded: December 16, 1978
- Dissolved: June 30, 1980
- Merged into: People's Alliance
- Ideology: Conservatism
- Political position: Right-wing
- National affiliation: Democratic Coalition
- Slogan: Una derecha para el progreso ("A right-wing for progress")

Progressive Democratic Party (Spanish: Partido Demócrata Progresista; PDP) was a Spanish conservative political party, founded in 1978. The main leader of the PDP was Alfonso Osorio, who was elected as MP in the elections of 1979.

== History ==
The party was a member of the Democratic Coalition, led by Manuel Fraga Iribarne.

On 13 September 1979 Osorio resigned as the party president, being replaced by Gabriel Camuñas Solís. The party joined People's Alliance on 30 June 1980.

== Electoral performance ==
=== Cortes Generales ===
Cortes Generales
Election	Leading candidate	Congress			Senate			Gov.
Election	Leading candidate	Votes	%	Seats	Votes	%	Seats	Gov.
1979	Manuel Fraga	Within CD		1 / 350	Within CD		0 / 208	(Note: Confidence and supply (1979–1980).)
1979	Manuel Fraga	Within CD		1 / 350	Within CD		0 / 208	(Note: 1980–1982.)
