= 1979 Spanish general election =

- 1 March 1979

All 350 seats in the Congress of Deputies and all 208 seats in the Senate 176 seats needed for a majority in the Congress of Deputies
- Opinion polls
- Registered: 26,836,490 ▲13.8%
- Turnout: 18,259,192 (68.0%) ▼10.8 pp
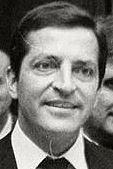

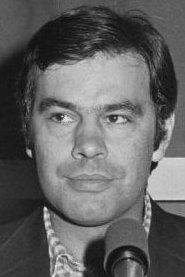

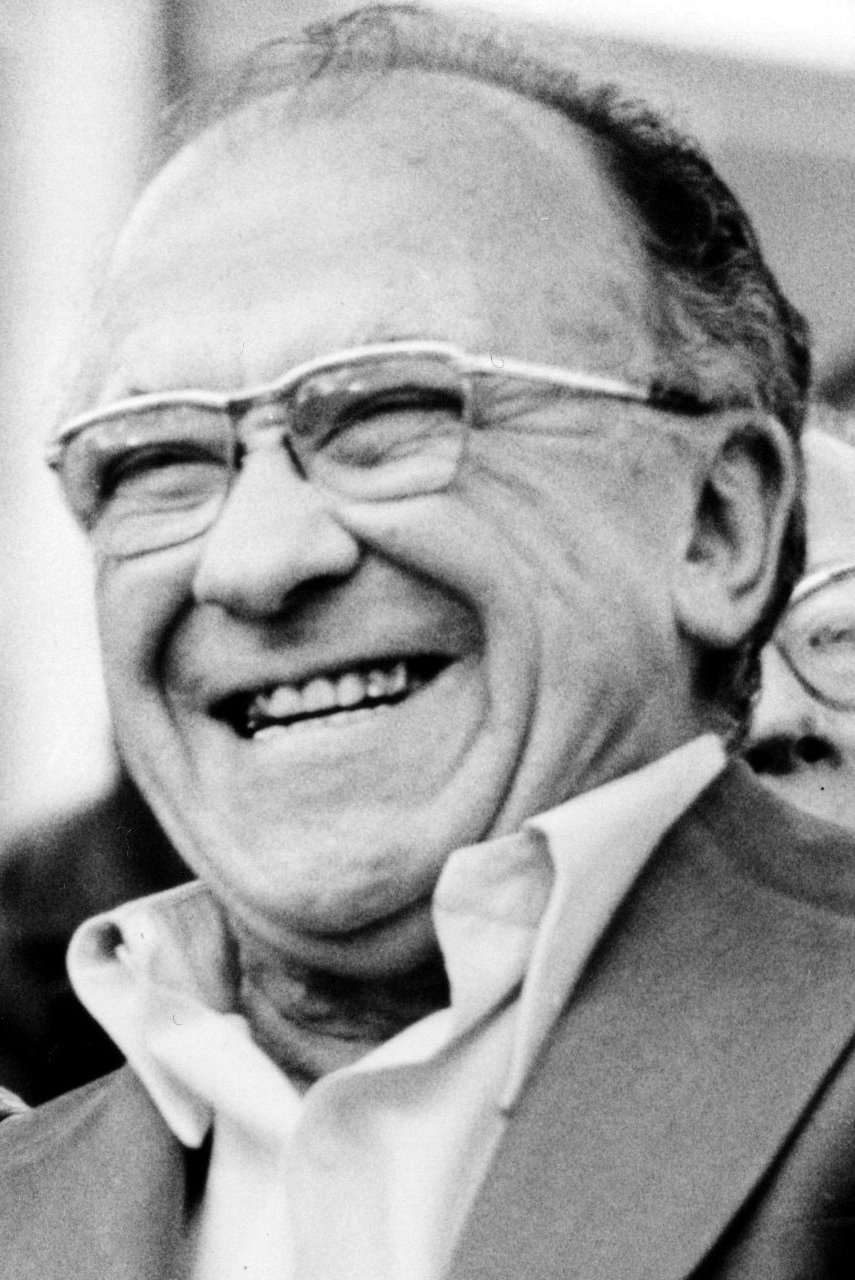

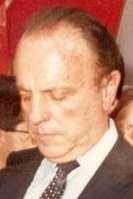

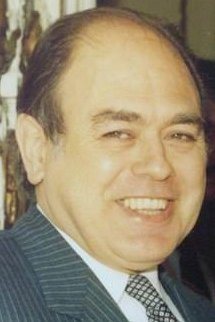

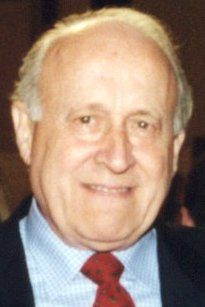
	First party	Second party	Third party
Leader	Adolfo Suárez	Felipe González	Santiago Carrillo
Party	UCD	PSOE	PCE
Leader since	3 May 1977	13 October 1974	3 July 1960
Leader's seat	Madrid	Madrid	Madrid
Last election	165 seats, 34.4%	124 seats, 33.8% (Note: Results for PSOE (29.3%, 118 deputies) and PSP–US (4.5%, 6 deputies) in the 1977 Congress election.)	20 seats, 9.3%
Seats won	168	121	23
Seat change	▲3	▼3	▲3
Popular vote	6,268,593	5,469,813	1,938,487
Percentage	34.8%	30.4%	10.8%
Swing	▲0.4 pp	▼3.4 pp	▲1.5 pp
	Fourth party	Fifth party	Sixth party
Leader	Manuel Fraga	Jordi Pujol	Xabier Arzalluz
Party	CD	CiU	EAJ/PNV
Leader since	9 October 1976	17 November 1974	1977
Leader's seat	Madrid	Barcelona	Guipúzcoa
Last election	16 seats, 8.4% (Note: Results for AP (8.3%, 16 deputies) and DIV (0.1%, 0 deputies) in the 1977 Congress election.)	13 seats, 3.8% (Note: Results for PDC (2.8%, 11 deputies) and UCiDCC (0.9%, 2 deputies) in the 1977 Congress election.)	8 seats, 1.6%
Seats won	9	8	7
Seat change	▼7	▼5	▼1
Popular vote	1,094,438	483,353	296,597
Percentage	6.1%	2.7%	1.6%
Swing	▼2.3 pp	▼1.1 pp	0.0 pp
Prime Minister before election
Adolfo Suárez
UCD
Prime Minister after election
Adolfo Suárez
UCD

A general election was held in Spain on 1 March 1979 to elect the members of the 1st Cortes Generales under the Spanish Constitution of 1978. All 350 seats in the Congress of Deputies were up for election, as well as all 208 seats in the Senate. This was the first election held under the new constitution that had been approved in a referendum on 6 December 1978 and which had lowered the voting age from 21 to 18, resulting in an increase of the electoral roll by three million people.

The Union of the Democratic Centre (UCD) remained the largest party, winning 168 of the 350 seats in the Congress of Deputies and 119 of the 208 seats in the Senate. The Spanish Socialist Workers' Party (PSOE), which had merged with the People's Socialist Party (PSP) and was widely expected to make large gains—with some opinion polls predicting a narrow win—fell short of expectations and lost ground when compared to the combined totals for the PSOE–PSP alliance in the 1977 election. The Communist Party of Spain obtained the best result in its history, whereas Manuel Fraga's Democratic Coalition (CD)—an electoral bloc formed by the People's Alliance, the Liberal Citizens Action and the Progressive Democratic Party—lost nearly half of its seats. The election would also see the best showing of the far-right in Spain until the April 2019 election, as Blas Piñar-led National Union would secure one seat with 2.1% of the vote share.

As a result of the election, Prime Minister Adolfo Suárez went on to form a UCD minority government, depending on support from the CD and other minor parties such as the Socialist Party of Andalusia–Andalusian Party, the Regionalist Aragonese Party and the Navarrese People's Union.

== Overview ==
Under the 1978 Constitution, the Spanish Cortes Generales were conceived as an imperfect bicameral system. The Congress of Deputies held greater legislative power than the Senate, having the ability to grant or withdraw confidence from a prime minister and to override Senate vetoes by an absolute majority. Nonetheless, the Senate retained a limited number of specific functions—such as ratifying international treaties, authorizing cooperation agreements between autonomous communities, enforcing direct rule, regulating interterritorial compensation funds, and taking part in constitutional amendments and in the appointment of members to the Constitutional Court and the General Council of the Judiciary—which were not subject to override by Congress. The electoral and procedural rules were the same as those used in the 1977 election.

=== Date ===
The term of the Spanish Cortes elected in the 1977 election was not to be continued beyond 15 June 1981, in the event they were not dissolved earlier. The election decree was required to be issued after the expiration date of parliament, with election day taking place within from 55 to 60 days after the decree's publication in the Official State Gazette (BOE), setting the latest possible date for election day on 14 August 1981.

The prime minister had the prerogative to propose the monarch to dissolve both chambers at any given time—either jointly or separately—and call a snap election, provided that no motion of no confidence was in process, no state of emergency was in force and that dissolution did not occur before one year after a previous one. Additionally, both chambers were to be dissolved, and a new election called, if an investiture process failed to elect a prime minister within a two-month period from the first ballot. Barring this exception, there was no constitutional requirement for simultaneous elections to the Congress and the Senate. Still, as of 2026, there has been no precedent of separate elections taking place under the 1978 Constitution.

The Cortes Generales were officially dissolved on 1 January 1979 with the publication of the corresponding decree in the BOE, setting election day for 1 March. The Congress and the Senate were scheduled to reconvene on 23 and 27 March, respectively.

=== Electoral system ===
Voting for each chamber of the Cortes Generales was based on universal suffrage, comprising all Spanish nationals over 18 years of age with full political rights.

The Congress of Deputies had a minimum of 300 and a maximum of 400 seats, with electoral provisions fixing its size at 350. Of these, 348 were elected in 50 multi-member constituencies corresponding to the provinces of Spain—each of which was assigned an initial minimum of two seats and the remaining 248 distributed in proportion to population, roughly one seat per 144,500 inhabitants or fraction above 70,000—using the D'Hondt method and closed-list proportional voting, with a three percent-threshold of valid votes (including blank ballots) in each constituency. The remaining two seats were allocated to Ceuta and Melilla as single-member districts elected by plurality voting. The use of this electoral method resulted in a higher effective threshold depending on district magnitude and vote distribution.

As a result of the aforementioned allocation, each Congress multi-member constituency was entitled to the following seats:

Seats	Constituencies
33	Barcelona
32	Madrid
15	Valencia
12	Seville
10	Biscay, Oviedo
9	Alicante, La Coruña
8	Cádiz, Málaga, Murcia, Pontevedra, Zaragoza
7	Badajoz, Córdoba, Granada, Guipúzcoa, Jaén, Santa Cruz de Tenerife
6	Balearics, Las Palmas, León
5	Almería, Cáceres, Castellón, Ciudad Real, Gerona, Huelva, Lugo, Navarre, Orense, Santander, Tarragona, Toledo, Valladolid
4	Álava, Albacete, Burgos, Cuenca, Lérida, Logroño, Salamanca, Zamora
3	Ávila, Guadalajara, Huesca, Palencia, Segovia, Soria, Teruel

208 Senate seats were elected using open-list (Note: Parties could group candidates into lists, although each candidate was treated separately for the purpose of the voting procedure.) partial block voting: voters in constituencies electing four seats could choose up to three candidates; in those with two or three seats, up to two; and in single-member districts, one. Each of the 47 peninsular provinces was allocated four seats, while in insular provinces—such as the Balearic and Canary Islands—the districts were the islands themselves, with the larger ones (Mallorca, Gran Canaria and Tenerife) being allocated three seats each, and the smaller ones (Menorca, Ibiza–Formentera, Fuerteventura, La Gomera, El Hierro, Lanzarote and La Palma) one each. Ceuta and Melilla elected two seats each. Additionally, autonomous communities could appoint at least one senator each and were entitled to one additional senator for every million inhabitants.

The law provided for by-elections to fill vacant seats in the Congress only when results in a constituency were annulled by a final sentence following an electoral petition; otherwise, vacancies arising after the proclamation of candidates and during the legislative term were filled by the next candidates on the party lists or, when required, by designated substitutes. Additionally for the Senate, by-elections were required to fill any seat vacated within the first two years of the legislative term.

== Candidates ==
=== Nomination rules ===
Spanish citizens with the right to vote could run for election. Causes of ineligibility applied to the following officials:

- Holders of a number of senior public or institutional posts, including the heads and members of higher courts and state institutions; (Note: These comprised the Constitutional Court, the Supreme Court, the Council of State, the Court of Auditors and the Council of National Economy.) the Ombudsman; high-ranking officials of government departments and other state agencies; government delegates in the autonomous communities and civil governors; members of electoral commissions; and the chairs of national trade unions;
- Judges and public prosecutors in active service;
- Members of the Armed Forces and law enforcement bodies in active service.

Other ineligibility provisions also applied to a number of territorial officials in these categories within their areas of jurisdiction.

Incompatibility rules included those of ineligibility (except for chairs of national trade unions), and also barred combining legislative roles (deputy and senator).

=== Parties and lists ===
The electoral law allowed for parties and federations registered in the interior ministry, alliances and groupings of electors to present lists of candidates. Parties and federations intending to form an alliance were required to inform the relevant electoral commission within 15 days of the election call, whereas groupings of electors needed to secure the signature of at least one permille—and, in any case, 500 signatures—of the electorate in the constituencies for which they sought election, disallowing electors from signing for more than one list.

Below is a list of the main parties and alliances which contested the election:

Candidacy	Parties and alliances	Leading candidate	Ideology	Previous result				Gov.	Ref.
Candidacy	Parties and alliances	Leading candidate	Ideology	Congress		Senate		Gov.	Ref.
Candidacy	Parties and alliances	Leading candidate	Ideology	Vote %	Seats	Vote %	Seats	Gov.	Ref.
UCD	List: Union of the Democratic Centre (UCD)	Adolfo Suárez	Centrism	34.4%	165	29.9%	106	Yes	
PSOE	List: Spanish Socialist Workers' Party (PSOE); Socialists' Party of Catalonia (PSC)	Felipe González	Social democracy Democratic socialism Marxism	33.8%	124	29.7% (Note: Results for PSOE (11.0%, 35 senators), SD (10.5%, 16 senators), PSP–US (5.1%, 2 senators) and PSI (3.1%, 8 senators) in the 1977 Senate election.)	61	No	
PCE	List: Communist Party of Spain (PCE); Unified Socialist Party of Catalonia (PSUC)	Santiago Carrillo	Eurocommunism	9.3%	20	2.0%	0	No	
CD	List: People's Alliance (AP); Liberal Citizens Action (ACL); Progressive Democratic Party (PDP); Foral Union of the Basque Country (UFPV) – People's Alliance (AP) – Basque Independent Democrats (DIV)	Manuel Fraga	Conservatism	8.4%	16	9.2% (Note: Results for AP (9.2%, 2 senators) and DIV (0.0%, 0 senators) in the 1977 Senate election.)	2	No	
CiU	List: Democratic Convergence of Catalonia (CDC); Democratic Union of Catalonia (UDC)	Jordi Pujol	Catalan nationalism Centrism	3.8%	13	2.6% (Note: Results for DiC in the 1977 Senate election.)	2	No	
EAJ/PNV	List: Basque Nationalist Party (EAJ/PNV)	Xabier Arzalluz	Basque nationalism Christian democracy	1.6%	8	3.3% (Note: Results for FA in the 1977 Senate election.)	10	No	
ERC–FNC	List: Republican Left of Catalonia (ERC); National Front of Catalonia (FNC); Social Democratic Party of Catalonia (PSDC)	Heribert Barrera	Catalan nationalism Left-wing nationalism Social democracy	0.8% (Note: Results for EC–FED in the 1977 election.)	1	Contested in alliance (Note: PSC–PSOE (7 senators) and ERC (1 senator), which contested the 1977 Senate election within the Entesa alliance, joined the Nova Entesa alliance ahead of the 1979 Senate election.)		No	
EE	List: Basque Country Left–Left for Socialism (EE)	Juan María Bandrés	Basque nationalism Socialism	0.3%	1	0.2%	1	No	
PAR	List: Regionalist Aragonese Party (PAR)	Hipólito Gómez de las Roces	Regionalism; Conservatism	0.2% (Note: Results for CAIC in the 1977 election.)	1	0.6%	1	No	
UN	List: New Force (FN); Spanish Phalanx of the CNSO (FE–JONS); José Antonio Circles (CJA); National Confederation of Veterans (CNE); Traditionalist Youth Group (AJT)	Blas Piñar	Ultranationalism; National catholicism Francoism	0.6% (Note: Results for AN18 (0.5%, 0 deputies) and CJA (0.0%, 0 deputies) in the 1977 Congress election.)	0	1.1% (Note: Results for AN18 (0.9%, 0 senators) and CJA (0.1%, 0 senators) in the 1977 Senate election.)	0	No	
HB	List: Basque Socialist Party (ESB/PSV); Revolutionary Patriotic Workers' Party (LAIA); People's Socialist Revolutionary Party (HASI); Basque Nationalist Action (EAE/ANV); Patriotic Socialist Committees (ASK)	Francisco Letamendia	Basque independence Abertzale left Revolutionary socialism	0.2% (Note: Results for ESB/PSV (0.2%, 0 deputies) and EAE/ANV (0.0%, 0 deputies) in the 1977 election.)	0	0.2% (Note: Results for ESB/PSV (0.1%, 0 senators) and EAE/ANV (0.1%, 0 senators) in the 1977 election.)	0	No	
PSC–ERC	List: Socialists' Party of Catalonia (PSC); Republican Left of Catalonia (ERC)	Josep Andreu	Catalanism; Social democracy	Did not contest			8	No	
PSUC–PTC	List: Unified Socialist Party of Catalonia (PSUC); Party of Labour of Catalonia (PTC)	Josep Benet	Communism; Marxism-Leninism; Republicanism	Did not contest		(Note: PSUC (4 senators), which contested the 1977 Senate election within the Entesa alliance, joined the Per l'Entesa alliance ahead of the 1979 Senate election.)	4	No	
CDG	List: Galician Democratic Candidacy (CDG)	Valentín Paz Andrade	Galicianism; Progressivism	Did not contest		1.2%	3	No	
AM	List: Majorera Assembly (AM)	Miguel Cabrera	Insularism	Did not contest		0.0%	1	No	
PSA–PA	List: Socialist Party of Andalusia–Andalusian Party (PSA–PA)	Alejandro Rojas-Marcos	Andalusian nationalism Social democracy	Did not contest				No	
UPC	List: United Canarian People (PCU) – Communist Party of the Canary Islands (provisional) (PCC(p)) – Communist Cells (CC); Party of Communist Unification in the Canaries (PUCC); Socialist Party of the Canary Islands (PSC)	Fernando Sagaseta	Canarian nationalism Socialism	Did not contest				No	
UPN	List: Navarrese People's Union (UPN)	Jesús Aizpún	Navarrese regionalism Conservatism; Christian democracy	Did not contest				No	

== Results ==
=== Congress of Deputies ===
← Summary of the 1 March 1979 Congress of Deputies election results →
Parties and alliances	Popular vote			Seats	
Parties and alliances	Votes	%	±pp	Total	+/−
Union of the Democratic Centre (UCD)	6,268,593	34.84	+0.40	168	+3
Spanish Socialist Workers' Party (PSOE)^{1}	5,469,813	30.40	−3.44	121	−3
Communist Party of Spain (PCE)	1,938,487	10.77	+1.44	23	+3
Democratic Coalition (CD)	1,094,438	6.08	−2.33	9	−7
Democratic Coalition (CD)^{2}	1,060,330	5.89	−2.05	9	−6
Foral Union of the Basque Country (UFPV)^{3}	34,108	0.19	−0.29	0	−1
Convergence and Union (CiU)^{4}	483,353	2.69	−1.06	8	−5
National Union (UN)^{5}	378,964	2.11	+1.54	1	+1
Socialist Party of Andalusia–Andalusian Party (PSA–PA)	325,842	1.81	New	5	+5
Basque Nationalist Party (EAJ/PNV)	296,597	1.65	+0.03	7	−1
Party of Labour of Spain (PTE)^{6}	192,798	1.07	+0.40	0	±0
Popular Unity (HB)^{7}	172,110	0.96	+0.72	3	+3
Workers' Revolutionary Organization (ORT)	138,487	0.77	+0.22	0	±0
Workers' Revolutionary Organization (ORT)^{8}	127,517	0.71	+0.29	0	±0
Navarrese Left Union (UNAI)	10,970	0.06	−0.07	0	±0
Spanish Socialist Workers' Party (historical) (PSOEh)^{9}	133,869	0.74	+0.05	0	±0
Republican Left of Catalonia–National Front of Catalonia (ERC–FNC)^{10}	123,452	0.69	−0.10	1	±0
Basque Country Left (EE)	85,677	0.48	+0.14	1	±0
Communist Movement–Organization of Communist Left (MC–OIC)	84,856	0.47	+0.28	0	±0
Galician National-Popular Bloc (BNPG)	60,889	0.34	+0.22	0	±0
Canarian People's Union (UPC)	58,953	0.33	New	1	+1
Left Bloc for National Liberation (BEAN)	56,582	0.31	New	0	±0
Galician Unity (PG–POG–PSG)^{11}	55,555	0.31	+0.16	0	±0
Republican Left (IR)	55,384	0.31	New	0	±0
Carlist Party (PC)	50,552	0.28	+0.23	0	±0
Communist Organization–Communist Unification (OCEBR–UCE)	47,937	0.27	New	0	±0
Workers' Communist Party (PCT)	47,896	0.27	New	0	±0
Regionalist Aragonese Party (PAR)^{12}	38,042	0.21	+0.01	1	±0
Revolutionary Communist League (LCR)^{13}	36,662	0.20	−0.02	0	±0
Spanish Phalanx of the CNSO (Authentic) (FE–JONS(A))	30,252	0.17	−0.08	0	±0
Navarrese People's Union (UPN)	28,248	0.16	New	1	+1
Coalition for Aragon (PSAr–PSDA)	19,220	0.11	New	0	±0
Nationalist Party of Castile and León (PANCAL)	16,016	0.09	New	0	±0
Liberal Party (PL)	15,774	0.09	New	0	±0
Valencian Regional Union (URV)	15,694	0.09	New	0	±0
Nationalist Party of the Valencian Country (PNPV)	13,828	0.08	New	0	±0
Spanish Ruralist Party (PRE)	10,324	0.06	New	0	±0
Party of the Canarian Country (PPC)	10,099	0.06	New	0	±0
Socialists of Mallorca and Menorca (SMiM)	10,022	0.06	New	0	±0
Syndicalist Party (PSIN)	9,777	0.05	New	0	±0
Union for the Freedom of Speech (ULE)	7,126	0.04	New	0	±0
Catalan State (EC)	6,328	0.04	New	0	±0
Cantonal Party (PCAN)	6,290	0.03	New	0	±0
Independent Candidacy of the Countryside (CIC)	6,115	0.03	New	0	±0
Social Christian Democracy of Catalonia (DSCC)	4,976	0.03	−0.02	0	±0
Proverist Party (PPr)	4,939	0.03	±0.00	0	±0
Spanish Democratic Republican Action (ARDE)	4,826	0.03	New	0	±0
Communist League (LC)	3,614	0.02	New	0	±0
Asturian Nationalist Council (CNA)	3,049	0.02	New	0	±0
Authentic Spanish Phalanx (FEA)	2,736	0.02	New	0	±0
Pro-Austerity Policy Political Party (PIPPA)	2,409	0.01	New	0	±0
Workers and Peasants Party (POC)	2,314	0.01	New	0	±0
Independent Candidates of Melilla (CIME)	1,820	0.01	New	0	±0
Falangist Unity–Independent Spanish Phalanx (UF–FI–AT)	1,188	0.01	New	0	±0
Spanish Phalanx–Falangist Unity (FE–UF)	876	0.00	New	0	±0
Centre Independent Candidacy (CIC)	n/a	n/a	−0.16	0	−1
Blank ballots	57,267	0.32	+0.07		
Total	17,990,915			350	±0
Valid votes	17,990,915	98.53	−0.04		
Invalid votes	268,277	1.47	+0.04		
Votes cast / turnout	18,259,192	68.04	−10.79		
Abstentions	8,577,298	31.96	+10.79		
Registered voters	26,836,490				
Sources
Footnotes: ^{1} Spanish Socialist Workers' Party results are compared to the combined totals of Spanish Socialist Workers' Party and People's Socialist Party–Socialist Unity in the 1977 election.; ^{2} Democratic Coalition results are compared to People's Alliance totals in the 1977 election, not including results in the Basque Country.; ^{3} Foral Union of the Basque Country results are compared to the combined totals of People's Alliance in the Basque Country and Basque Independent Democrats in the 1977 election.; ^{4} Convergence and Union results are compared to the combined totals of Democratic Pact for Catalonia and Union of the Centre and Christian Democracy of Catalonia in the 1977 election.; ^{5} National Union results are compared to the combined totals of National Alliance July 18 and José Antonio Circles in the 1977 election.; ^{6} Party of Labour of Spain results are compared to Democratic Left Front totals in the 1977 election.; ^{7} Popular Unity results are compared to the combined totals of the Basque Socialist Party and Basque Nationalist Action in the 1977 election.; ^{8} Workers' Revolutionary Organization results are compared to Workers' Electoral Group totals in the 1977 election.; ^{9} Spanish Socialist Workers' Party (historical) results are compared to Democratic Socialist Alliance totals in the 1977 election.; ^{10} Republican Left of Catalonia–National Front of Catalonia results are compared to Left of Catalonia–Democratic Electoral Front totals in the 1977 election.; ^{11} Galician Unity results are compared to Galician Socialist Party totals in the 1977 election.; ^{12} Regionalist Aragonese Party results are compared to Centre Independent Aragonese Candidacy totals in the 1977 election.; ^{13} Revolutionary Communist League results are compared to Front for Workers' Unity totals in the 1977 election.

Popular vote
UCD	34.84%
PSOE	30.40%
PCE	10.77%
CD	6.08%
CiU	2.69%
UN	2.11%
PSA–PA	1.81%
EAJ/PNV	1.65%
PTE	1.07%
HB	0.96%
ERC–FNC	0.69%
EE	0.48%
UPC	0.33%
PAR	0.21%
UPN	0.16%
Others	5.43%
Blank ballots	0.32%

Seats
UCD	48.00%
PSOE	34.57%
PCE	6.57%
CD	2.57%
CiU	2.29%
EAJ/PNV	2.00%
PSA–PA	1.43%
HB	0.86%
UN	0.29%
ERC–FNC	0.29%
EE	0.29%
UPC	0.29%
PAR	0.29%
UPN	0.29%

=== Senate ===
← Summary of the 1 March 1979 Senate of Spain election results →
Parties and alliances	Popular vote			Seats	
Parties and alliances	Votes	%	±pp	Total	+/−
Union of the Democratic Centre (UCD)	16,691,333	33.23	+3.35	119	+13
Spanish Socialist Workers' Party (PSOE)^{1}	12,762,128	25.41	−4.43	60	−1
Communist Party of Spain (PCE)	4,407,905	8.78	+6.82	0	±0
Democratic Coalition (CD)	2,897,073	5.77	−3.45	3	+1
Democratic Coalition (CD)^{2}	2,851,366	5.68	−3.02	3	+1
Foral Union of the Basque Country (UFPV)^{3}	45,707	0.09	−0.43	0	±0
New Agreement (PSC–ERC)^{4}	2,708,504	5.39	n/a	10	+2
For the Agreement (PSUC–PTC)^{4}	1,832,941	3.65	n/a	1	−3
Convergence and Union (CiU)^{5}	1,387,176	2.76	+0.21	1	−1
National Union (UN)^{6}	1,089,883	2.17	+1.10	0	±0
Socialist Party of Andalusia–Andalusian Party (PSA–PA)	1,026,345	2.04	New	0	±0
Basque Nationalist Party (EAJ/PNV)^{7}	843,452	1.68	−1.63	8	−2
Popular Unity (HB)^{8}	465,852	0.93	+0.74	1	+1
Party of Labour of Spain (PTE)^{9}	412,782	0.82	+0.57	0	±0
Workers' Revolutionary Organization (ORT)	290,967	0.58	−0.04	0	±0
Workers' Revolutionary Organization (ORT)^{10}	276,457	0.55	+0.13	0	±0
Navarrese Left Union (UNAI)	14,510	0.03	−0.17	0	±0
Communist Movement–Organization of Communist Left (MC–OIC)	257,830	0.51	New	0	±0
Basque Country Left (EE)	209,107	0.42	+0.18	0	−1
Republican Left (IR)	205,512	0.41	New	0	±0
Galician National-Popular Bloc (BNPG)	196,920	0.39	+0.07	0	±0
Spanish Socialist Workers' Party (historical) (PSOEh)^{11}	179,519	0.36	−0.82	0	±0
Galician Unity (PG–POG–PSG)	177,549	0.35	New	0	±0
Navarrese Unity (UNA)	137,275	0.27	New	0	±0
Spanish Phalanx–Falangist Unity (FE–UF)	130,616	0.26	New	0	±0
Regionalist Aragonese Party (PAR)^{12}	117,150	0.23	−0.37	0	−1
Valencian Regional Union (URV)	116,386	0.23	New	0	±0
Canarian People's Union (UPC)	115,878	0.23	New	0	±0
Liberal Party (PL)	110,347	0.22	New	0	±0
Revolutionary Communist League (LCR)	109,118	0.22	New	0	±0
Regionalist Party of Cantabria (PRC)	90,065	0.18	New	0	±0
Navarrese People's Union (UPN)	84,289	0.17	New	0	±0
Carlist Party (PC)	84,028	0.17	+0.10	0	±0
Spanish Democratic Republican Action (ARDE)	73,308	0.15	New	0	±0
Spanish Phalanx of the CNSO (Authentic) (FE–JONS(A))	70,659	0.14	+0.14	0	±0
Group of Independent Electors (ADEI)^{13}	63,257	0.13	−0.02	3	−1
Left Bloc for National Liberation (BEAN)	54,055	0.11	New	0	±0
Authentic Spanish Phalanx (FEA)	49,190	0.10	New	0	±0
Coalition for Aragon (PSAr–PSDA)	48,031	0.10	New	0	±0
Communist Organization–Communist Unification (OCEBR–UCE)	41,656	0.08	New	0	±0
Spanish Ruralist Party (PRE)	40,086	0.08	New	0	±0
Union for the Freedom of Speech (ULE)	38,968	0.08	New	0	±0
Pro-Austerity Policy Political Party (PIPPA)	36,280	0.07	New	0	±0
Independent (INDEP)	32,055	0.06	New	0	±0
Social Christian Democracy of Catalonia (DSCC)	29,367	0.06	New	0	±0
Galician Democratic Candidacy (CDG)	26,426	0.05	−1.11	0	−3
Party of the Canarian Country (PPC)	25,960	0.05	New	0	±0
Independent (INDEP)	21,891	0.04	New	1	+1
Socialist Party of Mallorca (PSM)	19,753	0.04	New	0	±0
Workers' Communist Party (PCT)	17,888	0.04	New	0	±0
Salamancan Regionalist Candidacy (CRS)	17,019	0.03	New	0	±0
Independent (INDEP)	14,758	0.03	New	0	±0
Menorcan Progressive Candidacy (PSM–PSOE–PCIB–PTI)	11,745	0.02	New	1	+1
Independent Candidacy of the Countryside (CIC)	10,333	0.02	New	0	±0
Nationalist Party of Castile and León (PANCAL)	8,795	0.02	New	0	±0
Asturian Nationalist Council (CNA)	8,309	0.02	New	0	±0
Entirely Anti-Partisan (EA)	7,931	0.02	New	0	±0
Independent Progressive Candidacy (CPI)	7,763	0.02	New	0	±0
Independent (INDEP)	7,266	0.01	New	0	±0
New National Left (NIN)	7,053	0.01	New	0	±0
Catalan State (EC)	6,998	0.01	New	0	±0
Riojan Autonomy (AR)	6,835	0.01	New	0	±0
Independent (INDEP)	5,263	0.01	New	0	±0
Zamorans for Zamora–Independent Candidacy (ZZ)	5,125	0.01	New	0	±0
National Front of Catalonia (FNC)	4,566	0.01	New	0	±0
Majorera Assembly (AM)	4,458	0.01	±0.00	0	−1
Spanish Communist Workers' Party (PCOE)	3,431	0.01	New	0	±0
Independent (INDEP)	3,416	0.01	New	0	±0
Canarian Nationalist Party (PNC)	3,141	0.01	New	0	±0
Independent (INDEP)	1,698	0.00	New	0	±0
Proverist Party (PPr)	242	0.00	New	0	±0
Xirinacs Electoral Group (AE Xirinacs)	n/a	n/a	−1.06	0	−1
Aragonese Candidacy of Democratic Unity (CAUD)	n/a	n/a	−1.04	0	−3
Blank ballots (Note: The percentage of blank ballots is calculated over the official number of valid votes cast, irrespective of the total number of votes shown as a result of adding up the individual results for each party.)	259,613	1.48			
Total	50,232,518			208	+1
Valid votes	17,588,988	97.20			
Invalid votes	507,434	2.80			
Votes cast / turnout	18,096,422	67.43			
Abstentions	8,740,068	32.57			
Registered voters	23,583,762				
Sources
Footnotes: ^{1} Spanish Socialist Workers' Party results are compared to the combined totals of Spanish Socialist Workers' Party, Democratic Senate, People's Socialist Party–Socialist Unity, Independent Progressives and Socialists and Democratic Group of Albacete in the 1977 election.; ^{2} Democratic Coalition results are compared to People's Alliance totals in the 1977 election, not including results in the Basque Country.; ^{3} Foral Union of the Basque Country results are compared to the combined totals of People's Alliance in the Basque Country and Basque Independent Democrats in the 1977 election.; ^{4} Within the Agreement of the Catalans alliance in the 1977 election.; ^{5} Convergence and Union results are compared to Democracy and Catalonia totals in the 1977 election.; ^{6} National Union results are compared to the combined totals of National Alliance July 18 and José Antonio Circles in the 1977 election.; ^{7} Basque Nationalist Party results are compared to Autonomous Front totals in the 1977 election.; ^{8} Popular Unity results are compared to the combined totals of the Basque Socialist Party and Basque Nationalist Action in the 1977 election.; ^{9} Party of Labour of Spain results are compared to Democratic Left Front totals in the 1977 election.; ^{10} Workers' Revolutionary Organization results are compared to Workers' Electoral Group totals in the 1977 election.; ^{11} Spanish Socialist Workers' Party (historical) results are compared to Democratic Socialist Alliance totals in the 1977 election.; ^{12} Regionalist Aragonese Party results are compared to Centre Independent Aragonese Candidacy totals in the 1977 election.; ^{13} Group of Independent Electors results are compared to Independents of Soria totals in the 1977 election.

Popular vote
UCD	33.23%
PSOE	25.41%
PCE	8.78%
CD	5.77%
PSC–ERC	5.39%
PSUC–PTC	3.65%
CiU	2.76%
UN	2.17%
PSA–PA	2.04%
EAJ/PNV	1.68%
HB	0.93%
ADEI	0.13%
INDEP	0.04%
CPMen	0.02%
Others	8.07%
Blank ballots	1.48%

Seats
UCD	57.21%
PSOE	28.85%
PSC–ERC	4.81%
EAJ/PNV	3.85%
CD	1.44%
ADEI	1.44%
PSUC–PTC	0.48%
CiU	0.48%
HB	0.48%
CPMen	0.48%
INDEP	0.48%

=== Maps ===
Election results by constituency (Congress).

Vote winner strength by constituency (Congress).

Vote winner strength by autonomous community (Congress). (Note: This territorial division is based on the autonomic system established under the Spanish Constitution of 1978, as opposed to the regional division established in 1833. Most autonomous communities would be constituted by the time of the 1982 election, with the rest being established in early 1983. The autonomous cities of Ceuta and Melilla would not be constituted as independent administrative entities until 1995.)

== Aftermath ==
=== Government formation ===
Investiture; Congress of Deputies; Nomination of Adolfo Suárez (UCD)
Ballot →	30 March 1979
Required majority →	176 out of 350
Yes: • UCD (168); • CD (8); • PSA–PA (5); • PAR (1); • UPN (1)	183 / 350
No: • PSOE (94); • PCE–PSUC (23); • PSC (16); • PNV (6); • PSE (6); • UN (1); • ERC (1); • EE (1); • UPC (1)	149 / 350
Abstentions: • CiU (8)	8 / 350
Absentees: • PSOE (4); • HB (3); • PSC (1); • CD (1); • PNV (1)	10 / 350

=== 1980 motion of no confidence ===
Motion of no confidence Congress of Deputies; Nomination of Felipe González (PSOE)
Ballot →	30 May 1980
Required majority →	176 out of 350
Yes: • PSOE (97); • PCE–PSUC (23); • PSC (17); • PSE (6); • PSA–PA (5); • ERC (1); • EE (1); • UPC (1); • Independent (1)	152 / 350
No: • UCD (166)	166 / 350
Abstentions: • CD (9); • CiU (7); • Independents (2); • FN (1); • PAR (1); • UPN (1)	21 / 350
Absentees: • PNV (7); • HB (3); • CiU (1)	11 / 350

=== 1980 motion of confidence ===
Motion of confidence Congress of Deputies; General Policy Statement (Prime Minister)
Ballot →	18 September 1980
Required majority →	Simple
Yes: • UCD (165); • CiU (8); • PSA–PA (5); • Independents (2)	180 / 350
No: • PSOE (97); • PCE–PSUC (23); • PSC (16); • CD (9); • PNV (7); • PSE (6); • FN (1); • EE (1); • UPC (1); • PAR (1); • UPN (1); • Independent (1)	164 / 350
Abstentions: • ERC (1); • Independent (1)	2 / 350
Absentees: • HB (3); • PSC (1)	4 / 350

=== 1981 investiture ===
Investiture; Congress of Deputies; Nomination of Leopoldo Calvo-Sotelo (UCD)
Ballot →	21 February 1981	23 February 1981	25 February 1981
Required majority →	176 out of 350	~~Simple~~	Simple
Yes: • UCD (165); • CD (9) (3 on 21 Feb); • CiU (9) (on 25 Feb); • PAR (1) (on 25 Feb); • UPN (1); • UA (1) (on 25 Feb)	169 / 350	Cancelled (as a result of a coup attempt)	186 / 350
No: • PSOE (95); • PCE–PSUC (23); • PSC (16); • PNV (7); • PSE (6); • PSA–PA (4); • Independents (3); • FN (1); • ERC (1); • EE (1); • UPC (1)	158 / 350	Cancelled (as a result of a coup attempt)	158 / 350
Abstentions: • CiU (9) (on 21 Feb); • CD (6) (on 21 Feb); • PAR (1) (on 21 Feb); • UA (1) (on 21 Feb)	17 / 350	Cancelled (as a result of a coup attempt)	0 / 350
Absentees: • HB (3); • PSOE (2) (1 on 21 Feb); • PSC (1); • PSA–PA (1) (on 21 Feb)	6 / 350	Cancelled (as a result of a coup attempt)	6 / 350

== Bibliography ==
Legislation

- Real Decreto-ley 20/1977, de 18 de marzo, sobre Normas Electorales (Royal Decree-Law 20/1977). Official State Gazette (in Spanish). 18 March 1977. BOE-A-1977-7445.
- Constitución Española (Constitution). Official State Gazette (in Spanish). 27 December 1978 [version as of 29 December 1978]. BOE-A-1978-31229.
- Real Decreto 3073/1978, de 29 de diciembre, de disolución del Congreso de los Diputados y del Senado y de convocatoria de elecciones generales (Royal Decree 3073/1978). Official State Gazette (in Spanish). 29 December 1978. BOE-A-1979-1.
- Real Decreto 514/1979, de 16 de marzo, por el que se convoca a los Diputados electos para constitución de la Junta Preparatoria del Congreso (Royal Decree 514/1979). Official State Gazette (in Spanish). 16 March 1979. BOE-A-1979-7895.
- Real Decreto 527/1979, de 20 de marzo, por el que se convoca a los Senadores electos para constitución de la Junta Preparatoria del Senado (Royal Decree 527/1979). Official State Gazette (in Spanish). 29 December 1978. BOE-A-1979-7986.

Other

- Carreras de Odriozola, Albert; Tafunell Sambola, Xavier (2005) [1989]. Estadísticas históricas de España, siglos XIX-XX (PDF) (in Spanish). Vol. 1 (II ed.). Bilbao: Fundación BBVA. pp. 1072–1097. ISBN 84-96515-00-1. Archived from the original (PDF) on 24 September 2015.
