= Democratic Coalition (Spain) =

Defunct political coalition in Spain

Democratic Coalition Coalición Democrática
- Leader: Manuel Fraga
- Founded: December 16, 1978
- Dissolved: 1982
- Succeeded by: People's Alliance–People's Democratic Party
- Headquarters: Madrid
- Ideology: National conservatism
- Political position: Centre-right to right-wing

Democratic Coalition (Spanish: Coalición Democrática, CD) was a Spanish electoral coalition formed in December 1978 to contest the general election the following year, after the approval of the Constitution.

== History ==
In the first weeks, the coalition - after its foundation on 16 December 1978 - adopted the names Spanish Democratic Confederation (Spanish: Confederación Democrática Española) or Progressive Democratic Confederation (Spanish: Confederación Demócrata Progresista) before changing its name to Democratic Coalition on 9 January 1979.

Alfonso Osorio and José María de Areilza had been ministers in the UCD governments, who resigned from them at different times because of disagreements with President Adolfo Suárez. The presidential candidate of the government was Manuel Fraga.

It won nine seats in the Congress of Deputies, nearly half of its predecessor, People's Alliance, had obtained in the 1977 elections. Given the dismal results, Fraga resigned as leader of the coalition and went solo in front of People's Alliance.

In the case of the 1979 municipal elections, Democratic Coalition withdrew in March of that year their lists of candidates for Madrid, Aviles, Cordoba, Bilbao and other cities.

The parliamentary group of Democratic Coalition continued as such until the 1982 general elections. In that year, People's Alliance formed with other parties a broad coalition that would later be known as the People's Coalition.

== Composition ==
The coalition brought together at the time of the 1979 election to various center-right parties:

- People's Alliance (AP) of Manuel Fraga Iribarne.
- Liberal Citizens Action (ACL) of José María de Areilza
- Progressive Democratic Party (PDProg) of Alfonso Osorio.
- Spanish Renewal (RE)
- People's Party of Catalonia (PPC) of Luis Montal.
- Environmentalist and Social Change
- Action for Ceuta (APC)
- Association of Basque Independent Democrats (DIV)
- Confederation of Conservative Parties.

== Electoral performance ==
=== Cortes Generales ===
Cortes Generales
Election	Leading candidate	Congress			Senate			Gov.
Election	Leading candidate	Votes	%	Seats	Votes	%	Seats	Gov.
1979	Manuel Fraga	1,094,438	6.1 (#4)	9 / 350	2,897,073	5.8 (#4)	3 / 208	(Note: Confidence and supply (1979–1980).)
1979	Manuel Fraga	1,094,438	6.1 (#4)	9 / 350	2,897,073	5.8 (#4)	3 / 208	(Note: 1980–1982.)
