= Catalonia in the Senate =

Catalan Senate alliance and parliamentary group

Catalonia in the Senate Catalunya al Senat
- Spokesperson: Ramon Sala i Canadell
- Founded: 1982
- Dissolved: April 1983
- Ideology: Catalan nationalism
- Members: See list of members

Catalonia in the Senate (Catalan: Catalunya al Senat) was a Catalan electoral alliance formed by Convergence and Union (CiU) and Republican Left of Catalonia (ERC) to contest the 1982 Spanish Senate election. It then existed as a parliamentary group in the Senate of Spain during the 1982–1986 legislature, whose constitution was allowed through the temporary incorporation of three senators from the Union of the Democratic Centre (UCD), though in practice it worked as CiU's group upon ERC's withdrawal in April 1983.

== Composition ==
Party
Convergence and Union (CiU)
Democratic Convergence of Catalonia (CDC)
Democratic Union of Catalonia (UDC)
Republican Left of Catalonia (ERC)

== Electoral performance ==
=== Senate ===
Senate
Election	Catalonia	
Election	Seats	+/–
1982	7 / 16	3
