= Catalan Agreement of Progress =

Union of center-left and left wing political parties in Catalonia

Catalan Agreement of Progress Agreement for Catalonia Progress Entesa Catalana de Progrés Entesa pel Progrés de Catalunya
- Founded: 2000
- Dissolved: 2015
- Merger of: PSC–PSOE; ERC (2000–2011); ICV; EUiA (2003–2015)
- Ideology: Federalism; Catalanism
- Political position: Centre-left to left-wing

Website
- www.entesa.cat

The Catalan Agreement of Progress (Catalan: Entesa Catalana de Progrés), rebranded as Agreement for Catalonia Progress (Catalan: Entesa pel Progrés de Catalunya) in 2011, was a union of center-left and left wing political parties in Catalonia. The union consisted of three parties: Socialists' Party of Catalonia (PSC–PSOE), Initiative for Catalonia Greens (ICV) and United and Alternative Left (EUiA). Between 2000 and 2011, Republican Left of Catalonia (ERC) was also part of the coalition.

== History ==
The union was founded before the Spanish general election, 2000 by four left wing and Catalan political parties in Catalonia. The union is only represented in the Spanish Senate.

== Composition ==
=== 2000 general election ===
Party
Socialists' Party of Catalonia (PSC–PSOE)
Republican Left of Catalonia (ERC)
Initiative for Catalonia–Greens (IC–V)

=== 2004 and 2008 general elections ===
Party
Socialists' Party of Catalonia (PSC–PSOE)
Republican Left of Catalonia (ERC)
Initiative for Catalonia Greens (ICV)
United and Alternative Left (EUiA)

=== 2011 general election ===
Party
Socialists' Party of Catalonia (PSC–PSOE)
Initiative for Catalonia Greens (ICV)
United and Alternative Left (EUiA)

== Electoral performance ==
=== Cortes Generales ===
Cortes Generales
Election	Leading candidate	Congress			Senate			Gov.
Election	Leading candidate	Votes	%	Seats	Votes	%	Seats	Gov.
2000	Mercedes Aroz	Did not contest			3,718,949	6.0 (#4)	8 / 208	No
2004	Mercedes Aroz	Did not contest			6,087,158	8.7 (#3)	12 / 208	(Note: Confidence and supply.)
2008	Maite Arqué	Did not contest			5,280,590	7.6 (#3)	12 / 208	Orange tick
2011	Mònica Almiñana	Did not contest			2,842,651	4.5 (#4)	7 / 208	No

== See also ==
- List of political parties in Catalonia
- Spanish Senate
