= Senate of Spain =

Upper house of the Cortes Generales

Coordinates: 40°25′14″N 3°42′46″W

Senate of Spain Senado de España Co-official languages Basque: Espainiako Senatua Catalan: Senat d'Espanya Galician: Senado de España Aranese: Senat d'Espanha
- 15th Senate of Spain

Type
- Type: Upper house

History
- Founded: 1834 (disbanded 1923–1977); 1977 (reinstituted)

Leadership
- President: Pedro Rollán (PP) since 17 August 2023
- First Vice President: Javier Maroto (PP) since 17 August 2023
- Second Vice President: Concha Andreu (PSOE) since 21 October 2025
- Majority leader: Alicia García Rodríguez (PP) since 30 November 2023
- Minority leader: Juan Espadas (PSOE) since 27 November 2023

Structure
- Seats: 267
- Political groups: Government (95): PSOE (91); MM (1); EiFS (1); ASG (1); GBai (1); Supported by (17): ERC-EH Bildu (9) (Note: EH Bildu (5); ERC (4)); PNV (5); Compromís (1); BNG (1); CCa (1); Opposition (154): PP (145); Junts (4); Vox (3); AHI (1); UPN (1)

Elections
- Voting system: Limited voting (209 seats); Election by the legislatures of the autonomous communities (58 seats)
- Last election: 23 July 2023

Meeting place
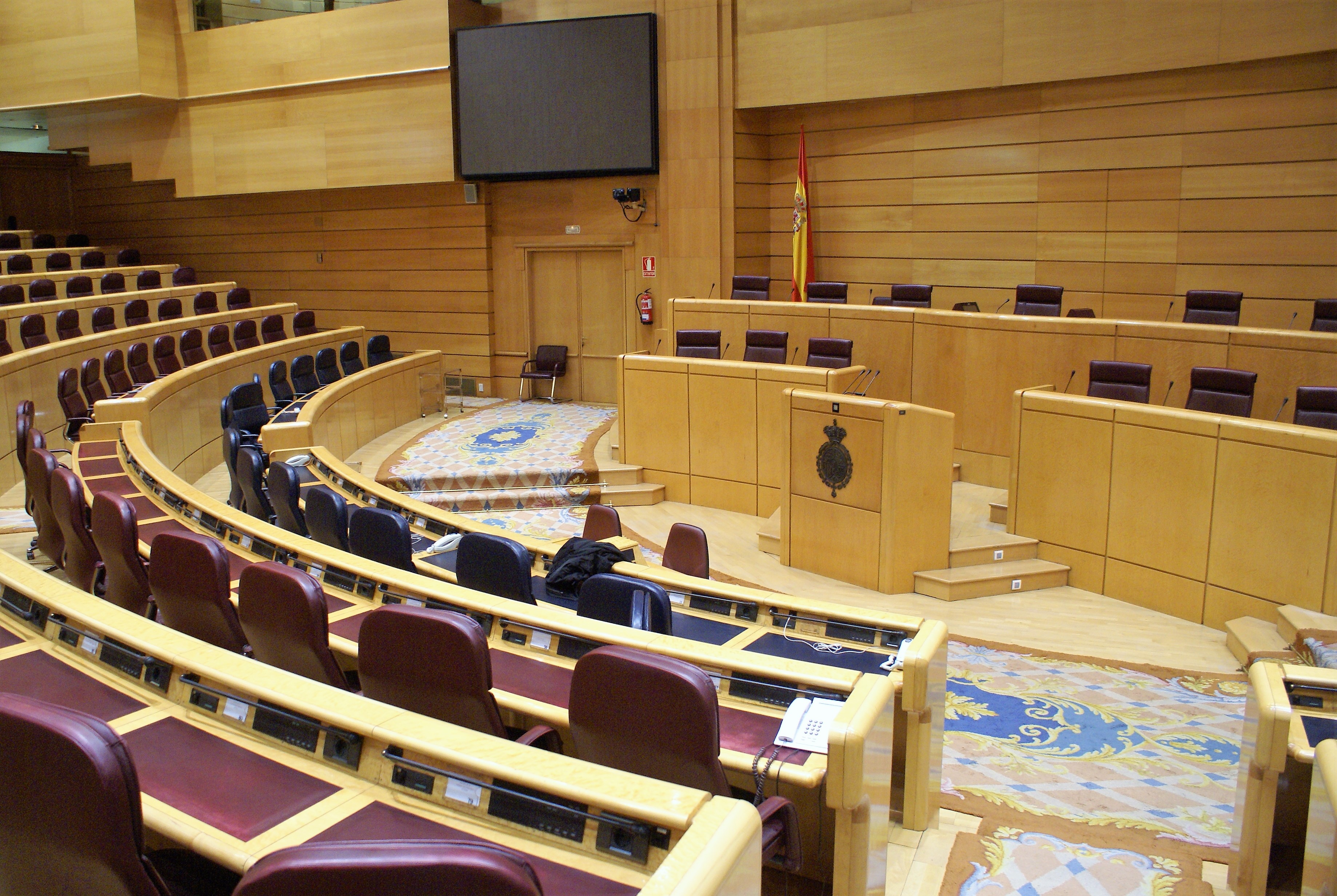
- Palacio del Senado; Centro, Madrid; Kingdom of Spain

Website
- senado.es

Rules
- Senate Standing Orders

The Senate (Spanish: Senado) is the upper house of the Cortes Generales, the bicameral parliament of the Kingdom of Spain. The Congress of Deputies is the lower house. The Senate meets in the Palace of the Senate in Madrid. The presiding officer of the Senate is the president of the Senate, who is elected by the members at the first sitting after each national election.

The composition of the Senate is established in Part III of the Spanish Constitution. Each senator represents a province, an autonomous city or an autonomous community. Each mainland province, regardless of its population size, is equally represented by four senators; in the insular provinces, the larger islands are represented by three senators and the minor islands are represented by a single senator. Likewise, the autonomous cities of Ceuta and Melilla elect two senators each. This direct election results in the election of 208 senators by the citizens. In addition, the regional legislatures also designate their own representatives, one senator for each autonomous community and another for every million residents, resulting in a total of 58 additional senators.

The Spanish Senate is constitutionally described as a territorial chamber. Consequently, although in general its powers are similar to those of the Congress of Deputies, it is endowed with exceptional powers such as authorising the Government to apply direct rule to a region or to dissolve local government councils.

Intensive debates about reforming the Senate's function and purpose have been going on for many years without any resolution.

== History ==
The first Spanish Constitution, the constitution of 1812, established a unicameral legislature; an upper Chamber did not exist.

The Senate was first established under the Royal Statute of 1834 approved by Queen Regent Maria Christina of the Two Sicilies under the denomination of House of Peers alongside the Deputies of the Realm. Under the constitution of 1837 it was named the Senate. Members were royal princes, hereditary nobility and clergy, and one appointed member for every 85 000 inhabitants. The districts were not yet fixed as today the electors were typically wealthy male citizens, selected through a census suffrage system. These electors then proposed a list of three persons to the king, who would choose one senator. It remained under the regimes of the constitution of 1845, draft constitution 1856.

With the glorious revolution 1869 the terna system was abolished; for a brief period of time Senators were elected indirectly until a hybrid model was adopted under constitution of 1876. Senators were of three main categories: senators by their own right, senators for life appointed by the crown, ex officio, or by institutions (archbishops, etc), and elected senators.

This house, along with the Congress of Deputies, was suppressed after the coup of General Miguel Primo de Rivera in 1923.

After the restoration of democracy during the Second Spanish Republic (1931-1939) the new regime opted for a unicameral system, which was continued under the Francoist dictatorship.

Only after the Spanish transition to democracy in 1977 was the Senate re-established, including regional representation, similar to the US senate and Swiss council of states.

== Role ==
The Spanish parliamentary system is bicameral but asymmetric. The Congress of Deputies has more independent functions, and it can also override most Senate measures. Only the Congress can grant or revoke confidence in the Prime Minister.

Either house may propose an ordinary law (or bill, Spanish: proyecto de ley). A bill passed by Congress can be amended or vetoed by the Senate, in which case the bill is then sent back to the lower house. The Congress can then override an amendment by a simple majority vote; in contrast, a veto can be overridden either directly by an absolute majority vote or by a simple majority vote after a wait of two months. Organic laws, which govern basic civil rights and regional devolution, need an absolute majority of the Congress to pass, which applies to the defeat of Senate vetoes too.

The process for constitutional amendments is more complicated: the rule is to require a three fifths (60%) of both houses, but if the Senate does not achieve such a supermajority and a joint congress-senate committee fails to resolve the issues, the Congress may force the amendment through with a two-thirds vote as long as an absolute majority of the Senate was in favour. But for some specific types of amendments including those related to most clauses related to human rights, both houses must approve of the amendment by a two thirds vote, and an election must be held and the amendment must pass by a two thirds vote a second time, and if that is approved, the people must vote for the amendment in a referendum by majority vote.

The Senate has certain exclusive functions including

- the appointment of constitutional posts, such as judges of the Constitutional Court or the members of the General Council of the Judiciary;
- disciplining regional governments. It exercised this power in October 2017 over the region of Catalonia. This decision gave to prime minister Mariano Rajoy the power to remove the regional government and to dissolve the regional legislature, and govern directly from Madrid.
- suspending local governments. It exercised this power in April 2006, dissolving the Marbella city council when most of its members were found to have engaged in corrupt practices.

Senate reform has been a topic of discussion since the early days of Spanish democracy. One proposal would advance the federalization of Spain by remaking the Senate to represent the autonomous communities of Spain.

== Organization ==
Senators form groups along party lines. Parties with fewer than ten senators form the Mixed Group. If the membership of an existing group falls below six during a session, it is merged into the Mixed Group at the next session. For example, Coalición Canaria lost its senate caucus in 2008 after electoral losses reduced its group from six to two. The Basque Nationalist Party, falling from seven to four, "borrowed" senators from the ruling Socialist Party to form their group; in exchange, they supported the election of socialist Javier Rojo as President of the Senate.

Legally, 133 seats are required for an absolute majority, vacant seats notwithstanding.

== Elections to the Senate ==
To date, senate elections have coincided with elections to the lower house, but the prime minister may advise the king to call elections for one house only. While the Congress of Deputies is chosen by party list proportional representation, the members of the senate are chosen in two distinct ways: popular election by limited voting and appointment from regional legislatures.

=== Directly elected members ===
Most members of the senate (currently 208 of 266) are directly elected by the people. Each province elects four senators without regard to population. Insular provinces are treated specially. The larger islands of the Balearics (Baleares) and Canaries (Canarias)—Mallorca, Gran Canaria, and Tenerife—are assigned three seats each, and the smaller islands—Menorca, Ibiza–Formentera, Fuerteventura, Gomera, Hierro, Lanzarote and La Palma—one each; Ceuta and Melilla are assigned two seats each. This allocation is heavily weighted in favor of small provinces; Madrid, with its 6.5 million people, and Soria, with 90,000 inhabitants, are each represented by four senators.

In non-insular constituencies, each party nominates three candidates. Candidates' names are organized in columns by party on a large (DIN A3 or larger) ochre-colored ballot called a sábana or bedsheet.

Each voter may mark up to three candidates' names, from any party. This is the only occasion when Spanish voters vote for individuals rather than a party list. Panachage is allowed, but typically voters cast all three votes for candidates of a single party. As a result, the four senators are usually the three candidates from the most popular party and the first placed candidate from the next most popular.

Before 2011, a party could not choose the order of its candidates on the ballot paper; candidates were sorted alphabetically by surname. When a party did not get all three of its candidates elected, this arrangement favored candidates with surnames early in the alphabet. This was the case for 2nd placed parties in every province and for both parties in tight races when voters did not vote for three candidates of the same party (panachage).

Key to parties EH Bildu EiFS ERC PSC PSE–EE PSOE ASG PNV Junts AHI UPN PP Ind. Vacant (*)
Autonomous Community	Provinces	Senators	Population (2023)	Senator/pop.-ratio	Distribution
Andalusia	8	32	8,584,147	268,254	11 / 21
Aragon	3	12	1,341,289	111,774	3 / 9
Asturias	1	4	1,006,060	251,515	1 / 3
Balearic Islands	1*	5 (Note: 3 for Mallorca (major island) and 1 for Menorca and Eivissa-Formentera (minor islands).)	1,209,906	241,981	1 / 1 / 3
Basque Country	3	12	2,216,302	184,691	4 / 4 / 4
Canary Islands	2*	11 (Note: 3 each for Gran Canaria and Tenerife (major islands) and 1 each for El Hierro, Fuerteventura, La Gomera, La Palma and Lanzarote (minor islands).)	2,213,016	201,183	7 / 1 / 1 / 2
Cantabria	1	4	588,387	147,096	1 / 3
Castile and León	9	36	2,383,703	66,213	9 / 27
Castilla–La Mancha	5	20	2,084,086	104,204	5 / 15
Catalonia	4	16	7,901,963	493,872	3 / 12 / 1
Extremadura	2	8	1,054,306	131,788	4 / 4
Galicia	4	16	2,699,424	168,714	4 / 12
La Rioja	1	4	322,282	80,570	1 / 3
Madrid	1	4	6,871,903	1,717,975	1 / 3
Murcia	1	4	1,551,692	387,923	1 / 3
Navarre	1	4	672,155	168,038	3 / 1
Valencian Community	3	12	5,216,195	434,682	4 / 8
Ceuta	N/A	2	83,052	41,526	2
Melilla	N/A	2	85,493	42,746	2
Total	50	208	48,085,361	276,039	Source:

=== Regional legislatures-appointed members ===
The legislative assembly of each autonomous community of Spain appoints senators to represent the community, with one senator per one million citizens, rounded up. Demographic growth increased the combined size of the regional appointed senators from 51 to 57 since 1983.

Conventionally, the proportions of the regional senators mimic their legislative assemblies. However, autonomous communities have considerable leeway, and a motion to appoint the regional senators often requires no more than a plurality:

Key to parties EH Bildu BNG Más Madrid Compromís ERC PSC PSE–EE PSOE GBai PNV Junts CC PP Vox Ind. Vacant (*)
Autonomous Community	Population (2023)	Senators	Senator/pop.-ratio	Election	Distribution
Andalusia	8,584,147	9	953,794	2022	3 / 5 / 1
Aragon	1,341,289	2	670,644	2023	1 / 1
Asturias	1,006,060	2	503,030	2023	1 / 1
Balearic Islands	1,209,906	2	604,953	2023	1 / 1
Basque Country	2,216,302	3	738,767	2024	1 / 1 / 1
Canary Islands	2,213,016	3	737,672	2023	1 / 1 / 1
Cantabria	588,387	1	588,387	2023	1
Castile and León	2,383,703	3	794,567	2022	1 / 2
Castilla–La Mancha	2,084,086	3	694,695	2023	2 / 1
Catalonia	7,901,963	8	987,745	2024	1 / 3 / 3 / 1
Extremadura	1,054,306	2	527,153	2023	1 / 1
Galicia	2,699,424	3	899,808	2024	1 / 2
La Rioja	322,282	1	322,282	2023	1
Madrid	6,871,903	7	981,700	2023	1 / 1 / 5
Murcia	1,551,692	2	775,846	2023	1 / 1
Navarre	672,155	1	672,155	2023	1
Valencian Community	5,216,195	6	869,365	2023	1 / 2 / 2 / 1
Total	48,085,361	58	724,856		Source:

== Composition ==
The last election was held on 23 July 2023. Following the election, the composition of the 15th Senate was:

Parliamentary group	Elected	App.	Total

People's Party Group in the Senate	120	24	144

Socialist Group	72	19	91
Spanish Socialist Workers' Party	53	14	67
Socialists' Party of Catalonia	12	3	15
Socialist Party of the Basque Country–Basque Country Left	4	1	5
Socialists' Party of Galicia	3	0	3

Republican Left–EH Bildu Group	7	4	11
Republican Left of Catalonia	3	3	6
EH Bildu	4	1	5

Plural Group in the Senate (JxCat–CC-AHI-BNG)	2	4	6
Together for Catalonia	1	2	3
Galician Nationalist Bloc	0	1	1
Canarian Coalition	0	1	1
Independent Herrenian Group	1	0	1

Basque Group in the Senate	4	1	5

Confederal Left Group	2	3	5
Gomera Socialist Group	1	0	1
Geroa Bai	0	1	1
Pacte Progressista	1	0	1
More Madrid	0	1	1
Commitment Coalition	0	1	1

Mixed Group	1	3	4
Vox	0	3	3
Navarrese People's Union	1	0	1

Vacant	0	2	2
Total	208	58	266

== Historical composition ==
=== Kingdom of Spain (since 1975) ===
SD / Entesa / UCD / PSOE / PA / PSP-US / FA / DiC / CDG / CAUD / CAIC / EAJ/PNV / EC-FED / EE / Others / CIC / CD / PSC-ERC / PSUC-PTC / CiU / HB / ERC / CiU-ERC / UPN / AP / CDS / IU / AHI / AIC / AM / PP / EIFS / CCa / PIL / Amaiur / CC-PNC / PSC–ICV–EUiA / PSC-ERC-IC-V / Aldaketa / ASG / Podemos / C's / DiL / EH Bildu / UP / CDC / Vox / Na+ / UPN / ¡TE! / ERC–EH Bildu / Junts / JxCat
1977	1 / 3 / 12 / 16 / 8 / 2 / 6 / 35 / 3 / 10 / 2 / 1 / 4 / 1 / 106 / 1 / 2
1979	1 / 1 / 1 / 10 / 60 / 4 / 1 / 8 / 119 / 3
1982	134 / 1 / 7 / 4 / 7 / 1 / 54
1986	1 / 124 / 3 / 7 / 8 / 1 / 1 / 63
1989	3 / 1 / 107 / 1 / 4 / 10 / 2 / 1 / 1 / 78
1993	1 / 96 / 3 / 10 / 5 / 93
1996	1 / 81 / 1 / 4 / 8 / 1 / 1 / 112
2000	8 / 53 / 6 / 8 / 1 / 5 / 127
2004	12 / 81 / 1 / 6 / 4 / 3 / 102
2008	1 / 1 / 12 / 86 / 2 / 4 / 1 / 101
2011	3 / 7 / 48 / 4 / 9 / 1 / 136
2015	16 / 1 / 6 / 47 / 1 / 6 / 6 / 1 / 124
2016	16 / 10 / 43 / 1 / 5 / 2 / 1 / 130
Apr. 2019	1 / 11 / 123 / 1 / 9 / 2 / 4 / 3 / 54
Nov. 2019	1 / 11 / 93 / 1 / 9 / 3 / 2 / 3 / 83 / 2
Nov. 2023	7 / 1 / 72 / 1 / 4 / 1 / 1 / 1 / 120

== Committees ==
Committee	Chair(s)		Term
Agriculture, Fisheries and Food	María Teresa Macías	PSOE	2019–present
Foreign Affairs	Antonio Gutiérrez Limones	PSOE	2019–present
Ibero-American Affairs	César Alejandro Mogo Zaro	PSOE	2019–present
Science, Innovation and Universities	Francisco Javier de Lucas Martín	PSOE	2019–present
Constitutional	Antonio Magdaleno Alegría	PSOE	2019–present
International Cooperation for Development	Elena Diego	PSOE	2019–present
Culture and Sport	Manuel Escarda Escarda	PSOE	2019–present
Defence	Pilar Llop Cuenca	PSOE	2019–present
Rights of Families, Childhood and Adolescence	María de los Ángeles Luna Morales	PSOE	2019–present
Economy and Business	Javier Garcinuño Rama	PSOE	2019–present
Education and Vocational Training	José Asensi Sabater	PSOE	2019–present
Local Administrations	Miguel Carmelo Dalmau Blanco	PSOE	2019–present
Public Works	José Fernández Blanco	PSOE	2019–present
Civil Service	Salvador Vidal Varela	PSOE	2019–present
General on Autonomous Communities	Joan Lerma Blasco	PSOE	2019–present
Finance	Cosme Bonet Bonet	PSOE	2019–present
Equality	Josefina Antonia Bueno Alonso	PSOE	2019–present
Incompatibilities	Julia María Liberal Liberal	PSOE	2019–present
Industry, Trade and Tourism	Marisa Bustinduy	PSOE	2019–present
Home Affairs	María Jesús Castro Mateos	PSOE	2019–present
Justice	Francisco Manuel Fajardo Palarea (PSOE)	PSOE	2019–present
Nominations	Manuel Cruz	PSOE	2019–present
Rules	Manuel Cruz	PSOE	2019–present
Comprehensive Disability Policies	María Teresa Fernández Molina	PSOE	2019–present
Petitions	Micaela Navarro	PSOE	2019–present
Budget	José Antonio Monago	PP	2019–present
Health, Consumer Affairs and Social Welfare	Modesto Pose Mesura	PSOE	2019–present
Petitions by a Court	Félix Ortega Fernández	PSOE	2019–present
Labour, Migrations and Social Security	Antonio Armando Ferrer	PSOE	2019–present
Ecological Transition	María Isabel Moreno Duque	PSOE	2019–present

== Presidents of the Senate of Spain ==
This is a list of the Presidents of the Senate since the reestablishment of the upper house in 1977. To see previous presidents, look the full list of presidents of the Senate.

Portrait	Name (Birth–Death)	Term of office	Tenure (Years and days)	Party	Legislature	Monarch (Reign)	^{Ref.}
	Antonio Fontán; President of the Senate (1923–2010)	13 July 1977 — 2 January 1979	1 year, 173 days	Union of the Democratic Centre	Constituent (1977)	Juan Carlos I (1975–2014)	
	Cecilio Valverde Mazuelas; President of the Senate (1927–2001)	27 April 1979 — 31 August 1982	3 years, 126 days	Union of the Democratic Centre	I (1979)	Juan Carlos I (1975–2014)	
	José Federico de Carvajal; President of the Senate (1930–2015)	18 November 1982 — 2 September 1989	6 years, 349 days	Spanish Socialist; Workers' Party	II (1982)	Juan Carlos I (1975–2014)	
	José Federico de Carvajal; President of the Senate (1930–2015)	18 November 1982 — 2 September 1989	6 years, 349 days	Spanish Socialist; Workers' Party	III (1986)	Juan Carlos I (1975–2014)	
	Juan José Laborda; President of the Senate (born 1947)	21 November 1989 — 9 January 1996	6 years, 49 days	Spanish Socialist; Workers' Party	IV (1989)	Juan Carlos I (1975–2014)	
	Juan José Laborda; President of the Senate (born 1947)	21 November 1989 — 9 January 1996	6 years, 49 days	Spanish Socialist; Workers' Party	V (1993)	Juan Carlos I (1975–2014)	
	Juan Ignacio Barrero; President of the Senate (born 1943)	27 March 1996 — 8 February 1999	2 years, 318 days	People's Party	VI (1996)	Juan Carlos I (1975–2014)	
	Esperanza Aguirre; Countess consort of Murillo; President of the Senate (born 1952)	8 February 1999 — 21 October 2002	3 years, 255 days	People's Party	VI (1996)	Juan Carlos I (1975–2014)	
	Esperanza Aguirre; Countess consort of Murillo; President of the Senate (born 1952)	8 February 1999 — 21 October 2002	3 years, 255 days	People's Party	VII (2000)	Juan Carlos I (1975–2014)	
	Juan José Lucas; President of the Senate (born 1944)	22 October 2002 — 20 January 2004	1 year, 90 days	People's Party	VII (2000)	Juan Carlos I (1975–2014)	
	Javier Rojo; President of the Senate (born 1949)	2 April 2004 — 27 September 2011	7 years, 178 days	Spanish Socialist; Workers' Party	VIII (2004)	Juan Carlos I (1975–2014)	
	Javier Rojo; President of the Senate (born 1949)	2 April 2004 — 27 September 2011	7 years, 178 days	Spanish Socialist; Workers' Party	IX (2008)	Juan Carlos I (1975–2014)	
	Pío García-Escudero; 4th Count of Badarán; President of the Senate (born 1952)	13 December 2011 — 20 May 2019	7 years, 158 days	People's Party	X (2011)	Juan Carlos I (1975–2014)	
	Pío García-Escudero; 4th Count of Badarán; President of the Senate (born 1952)	13 December 2011 — 20 May 2019	7 years, 158 days	People's Party	X (2011)	Felipe VI (2014–present)	
	Pío García-Escudero; 4th Count of Badarán; President of the Senate (born 1952)	13 December 2011 — 20 May 2019	7 years, 158 days	People's Party	XI (2015)	Felipe VI (2014–present)	
	Pío García-Escudero; 4th Count of Badarán; President of the Senate (born 1952)	13 December 2011 — 20 May 2019	7 years, 158 days	People's Party	XII (2016)	Felipe VI (2014–present)	
	Manuel Cruz Rodríguez; President of the Senate (born 1951)	21 May 2019 — 2 December 2019	195 days	Spanish Socialist; Workers' Party	XIII (2019)	Felipe VI (2014–present)	
	Pilar Llop; President of the Senate (born 1973)	3 December 2019 — 8 July 2021	1 year, 217 days	Spanish Socialist; Workers' Party	XIV (2019)	Felipe VI (2014–present)	
	Ander Gil; President of the Senate (born 1974)	12 July 2021 — 16 August 2023	2 years, 35 days	Spanish Socialist; Workers' Party	XIV (2019)	Felipe VI (2014–present)	
	Pedro Rollán; President of the Senate (born 1974)	17 August 2023 — Incumbent	3 years, 95 days	People's Party	XV (2023)	Felipe VI (2014–present)	

== Bibliography ==
- Local Government Act [Reguladora de las Bases del Régimen Local] (7/1985) (in Spanish). Agencia Estatal Boletín Oficial del Estado. 2 April 1985.
- "The Spanish Constitution" (PDF). Agencia Estatal Boletín Oficial del Estado. 1978.
- Electoral System Act [Régimen Electoral General] (Organic Law 5/1985) (in Spanish). Agencia Estatal Boletín Oficial del Estado. 19 June 1985.
- "Spain - Summary". Division of Powers. European Committee of the Regions.
