= Maribel Moreno Duque =

Spanish politician (born 1970)

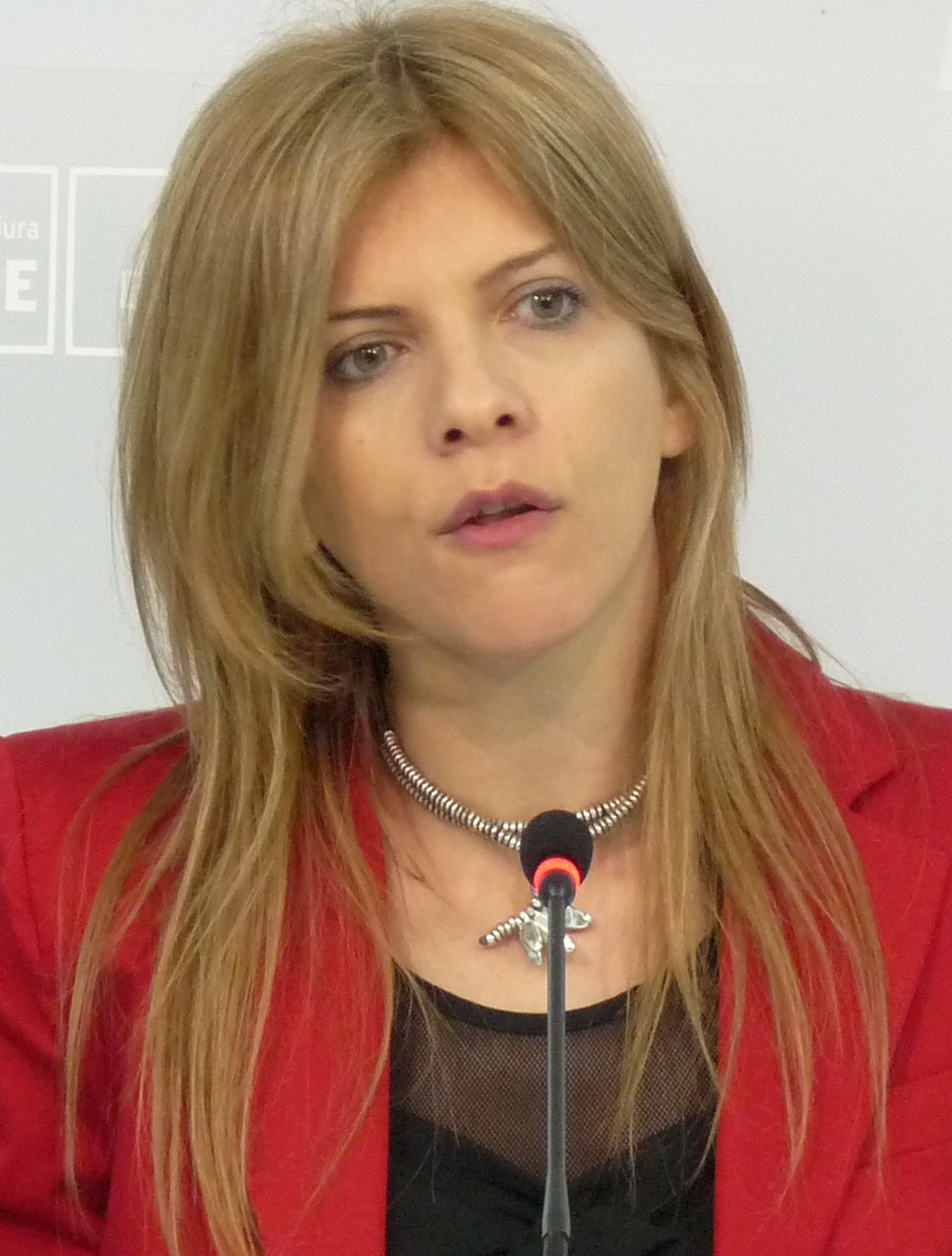
- Moreno in 2013

Member of the Senate
- Incumbent
- Assumed office 21 May 2019
- Constituency: Cáceres

Personal details
- Born: 5 March 1970 (age 56)
- Party: Spanish Socialist Workers' Party

María Isabel Moreno Duque (born 5 March 1970) is a Spanish politician serving as a member of the Senate since 2019. From 2007 to 2015, she was a member of the Assembly of Extremadura.
