= Unidad Falangista Montañesa =

Unidad Falangista Montañesa Falangist Mountain Unity
- President: Ramón Garcia-Salmones Salas
- Founded: March 24, 1980
- Dissolved: 1984
- Merged into: Falange Española de las JONS
- Ideology: Falangism; Neofascism; Spanish nationalism
- Political position: Far-right
- Union affiliation: Association of National-Syndicalist Workers

Unidad Falangista Montañesa (English: Falangist Mountain Unity) was a Falangist political party in Cantabria, Spain. It was formed by the Provincial Junta for Promotion of Falangist Unity, a group that had broken away from FE de las JONS on July 1, 1978. UFM was registered as a political party on March 24, 1980. The founding president of UFM was Ramón Garcia-Salmones Salas.

In December 1980, the 'Doctrinal Circle of José Antonio, Ramiro and Onésimo', a group led by José Antonio Caporredondo, merged into UFM.

The trade union wing of UFM was the Association of National-Syndicalist Workers.

== 1st Congress ==
The 1st congress of UFM was held on January 31 February 1, 1981, in Gran Hotel, Caldas de Besaya Spa. Discussions topics were 'Falangist Unity', 'Statues and Organization', 'Trade Union Action' and 'Municipal Politics'. 400 UFM militants attended the congress.

== 2nd Congress ==
The 2nd congress of UFM was held May 1 to May 2, 1982, also in the Caldas de Besaya Spa. At the congress Pedro Vallés Gómez was elected as the new president of UFM.

== 1982 elections ==
In the 1982 parliamentary election the list of the 'Coalición Unidad Falangista Montañesa (Movimiento Falangista de España)' obtained 827 votes (0.28% of the votes in Cantabria). In Los Corrales de Buelna, the party got 172 votes (2.67% of local votes).

== 1983 local elections ==
Ahead of the 1983 municipal elections, UFM launched candidatures in Los Corrales de Buelna and San Felices de Buelna. In San Felices de Buelna, the list was headed by Manuel Fernandez Garcia. In Los Corrales de Buelna, de list was headed by Claudio Mendichucha and with Ramón Garcia-Salmones as the number two. Both were elected.

== Merger with FE de las JONS ==
On August 26, 1983, Vallés informed the members of the party leadership about a proposal to merge with FE de las JONS. The proposal was adopted, and the party merged into FE de las JONS around September 1984. The merger was facilitated by the shift of leadership in FE de las JONS, with Diego Márquez Horrillo taking over the helm of the party.
