= New Agreement =

New Agreement Nova Entesa
- Leader: Josep Andreu
- Founded: 1979
- Dissolved: 1982
- Preceded by: Agreement of the Catalans
- Ideology: Catalanism
- Political position: Centre-left to left-wing
- Members: See list of members

New Agreement (Catalan: Nova Entesa) was a Catalan electoral alliance formed by the Socialists' Party of Catalonia (PSC) and Republican Left of Catalonia (ERC) to contest the 1979 Spanish Senate election. ERC and the PSC's predecessors, the Socialist Party of Catalonia–Congress (PSC–C) and the Catalan Socialist Federation (FSC), had formed the Agreement of the Catalans in the preceding election together with the Unified Socialist Party of Catalonia (PSUC) and Catalan State (EC), but the alliance broke up into two in early 1979, the other part coalescing around the For the Agreement alliance.

== Composition ==
Party
Socialists' Party of Catalonia (PSC)
Republican Left of Catalonia (ERC)

== Electoral performance ==
=== Senate ===
Senate
Election	Catalonia				
Election	Votes		%	Seats	+/–
1979	Candidates 1 Candidates 2 Candidates 3	952,826; 893,027; 862,651	32.90% 30.84% 29.79%	10 / 16	2 (Note: Compared to the combined totals of Catalan Socialist Federation, Socialist Party of Catalonia–Congress and Republican Left of Catalonia (within Agreement of the Catalans) in the 1977 general election.)
