= For the Agreement =

For the Agreement Per l'Entesa
- Leader: Josep Benet
- Founded: 1979
- Dissolved: 1979
- Preceded by: Agreement of the Catalans
- Ideology: Communism; Marxism-Leninism; Republicanism
- Political position: Left-wing
- Members: See list of members

For the Agreement (Catalan: Per l'Entesa) was a Catalan electoral alliance formed by the Unified Socialist Party of Catalonia (PSUC) and Party of Labour of Catalonia (PTC) to contest the 1979 Spanish Senate election. The PSUC had formed the Agreement of the Catalans in the preceding election together with the Socialist Party of Catalonia–Congress (PSC–C), the Catalan Socialist Federation (FSC), Republican Left of Catalonia (ERC) and Catalan State (EC), but the alliance broke up into two in early 1979, the other part coalescing around the New Agreement alliance.

== Composition ==
Party
Unified Socialist Party of Catalonia (PSUC)
Party of Labour of Catalonia (PTC)

== Electoral performance ==
=== Senate ===
Senate
Election	Catalonia				
Election	Votes		%	Seats	+/–
1979	Candidates 1 Candidates 2 Candidates 3	704,355; 604,041; 524,545	24.32% 20.86% 18.11%	1 / 16	3 (Note: Compared to Unified Socialist Party of Catalonia totals (within Agreement of the Catalans) in the 1977 general election.)
