= Agreement of the Catalans =

Agreement of the Catalans Entesa dels Catalans
- Leader: Josep Benet
- Founded: 7 May 1977
- Dissolved: 25 January 1979
- Succeeded by: New Agreement; For the Agreement
- Ideology: Catalanism; Autonomism
- Political position: Centre-left to left-wing
- Members: See list of members

Agreement of the Catalans (Catalan: Entesa dels Catalans) was a Catalan electoral alliance formed by the Socialist Party of Catalonia–Congress (PSC–C), the Catalan Socialist Federation (FSC), the Unified Socialist Party of Catalonia (PSUC) and the Left of Catalonia platform—supported by the still-illegal Republican Left of Catalonia (ERC), Party of Labour of Catalonia (PTC) and Catalan State (EC)—to contest the 1977 Spanish Senate election. Securing 12 out of the 16 Catalan senators at stake, the alliance's performance has been considered a historical success.

The alliance broke up on 15 January 1979, shortly before the 1979 general election.

== History ==
The alliance had its roots in a proposal made in December 1976 by Joan Reventós, secretary-general of the Socialist Party of Catalonia–Congress (PSC–C), for a broad "Catalan agreement" (Catalan: entesa catalana) of Catalanist parties to ensure a strong Catalan presence in the first democratically elected parliament and centered around three common points: political amnesty for those prosecuted during Francoism, repealing of the 1938 decree declaring the invalidity of the 1932 Catalan Statute of Autonomy and the restoration of the Generalitat de Catalunya. Taking into account the different electoral systems planned for the two chambers of parliament, this "entesa" provided that all involved parties would be forming joint lists for the election to the Spanish Senate, whereas for the Congress of Deputies they could run independently but incorporating these common points in their electoral programmes. On 16 January 1977, the PSC–C signed a manifesto formalizing his position in favour of an "agreement of the Catalans" in defense of the Statute and the Generalitat ahead of the upcoming Spanish legislative election, which throughout the following weeks it would offer to opposition parties in Catalonia interested in forming such alliance.

In a meeting held on 7 March, Catalan politicians from parties of the entire political spectrum—including the PSC–C, Republican Left of Catalonia (ERC), the Unified Socialist Party of Catalonia (PSUC), the Socialist Party of Catalonia–Regrouping (PSC–R), the People's Party of Catalonia (PPC), Catalan Federation of the PSOE, Democratic Union of Catalonia (UDC) and Democratic Convergence of Catalonia (CDC)—expressed their interest on the prospects of a joint Catalan candidacy for the Senate. By April 1977, negotiations were ongoing for a broad Senate alliance comprising all parties of the Catalan democratic opposition, but they stagnated over the inclusion of PSUC candidates in the lists as well as because of strategical differences between the various parties. With the unitary list being ultimately discarded, on 3 May the Democracy and Catalonia alliance was registered by CDC, UDC, the PSC–R, as well as the Democratic Left of Catalonia (EDC), the National Front of Catalonia (FNC) and the Catalan Centre (CC), with the parties from the Catalan left-of-centre spectrum planning an alternative candidacy modeled after the coalitions signed for the Congress.

The final alliance agreement was reached on 7 May by the constituent parties of the Socialists of Catalonia bloc (PSOE and Socialist Party of Catalonia–Congress (PSC–C)), the remaining parties in the late Left Front (ERC and Catalan State (EC)) and the PSUC. However, as the new alliance had been hastily established following the failure of the unitary list under the "Democracy and Catalonia" umbrella, it was registered under the "Socialists of Catalonia" label which, as a result of being already at use by the PSC–PSOE list for the Congress, led to the name being changed to "Agreement of the Catalans" and in the Electoral Commission not granting the candidacy any radio or TV spaces.

== Composition ==
Party
Socialist Party of Catalonia–Congress (PSC–C)
Catalan Socialist Federation (PSOE)
Unified Socialist Party of Catalonia (PSUC)
Left of Catalonia (EC–FED)

== Electoral performance ==
=== Senate ===
Senate
Election	Catalonia				
Election	Votes		%	Seats	+/–
1977	Candidates 1 Candidates 2 Candidates 3	1,643,528; 1,565,646; 1,492,412	53.95% 51.39% 48.99%	12 / 16	—
