= Tarragona (Congress of Deputies constituency) =

Electoral constituency in Spain

Coordinates: 41°10′N 1°00′W

- Congress of Deputies; Electoral constituency
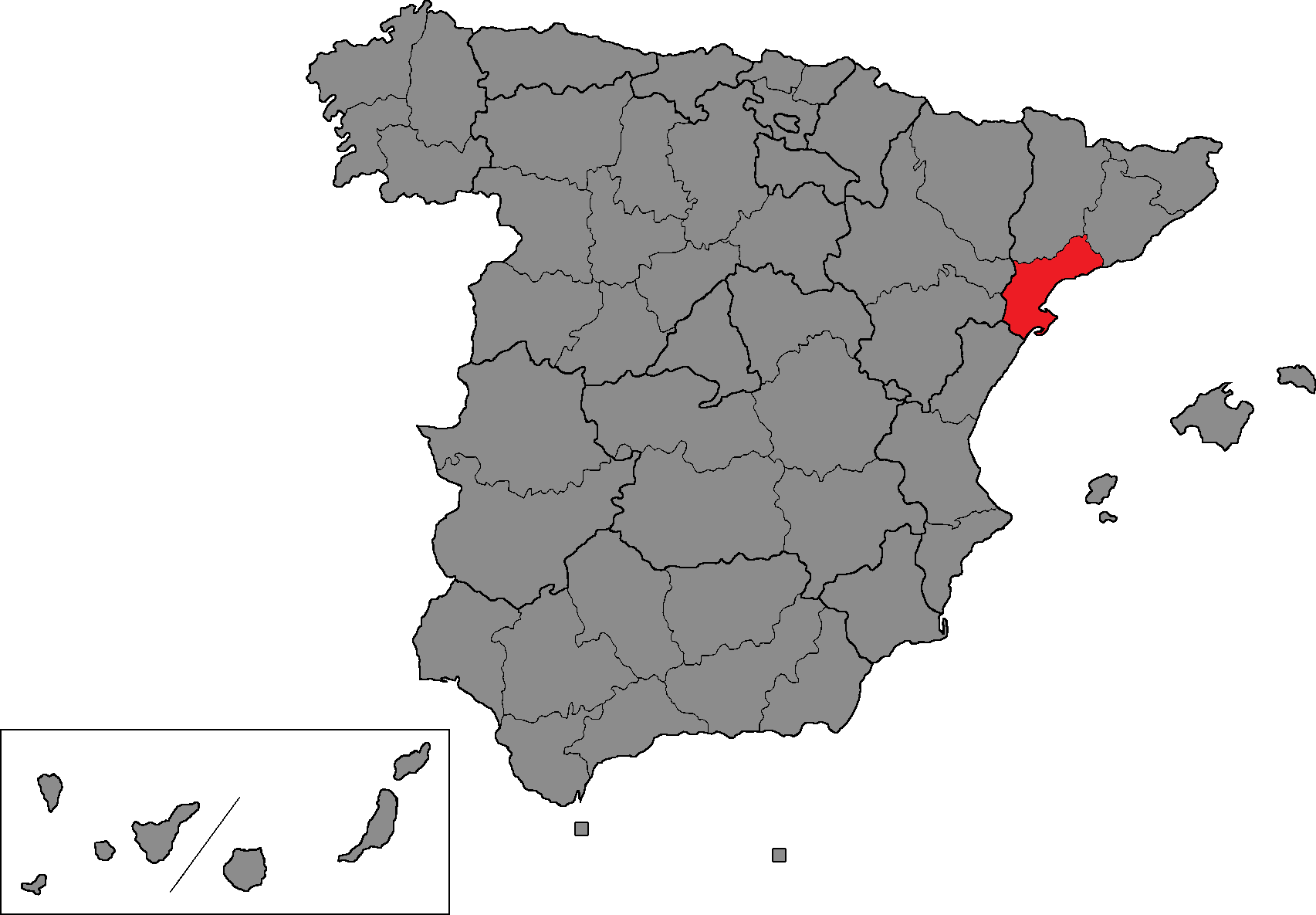
- Location of Tarragona within Spain
- Province: Tarragona
- Autonomous community: Catalonia
- Population: ▲861,531 (2024)
- Electorate: ▲596,689 (2023)
- Major settlements: Tarragona, Reus

Current constituency
- Created: 1977
- Seats: 5 (1977–1993); 6 (1993–present)
- Members: PSC (2); ERC (1); PP (1); Sumar−ECP (1); Junts (1)

Tarragona is one of the 52 constituencies represented in the Congress of Deputies, the lower chamber of the Spanish parliament, the Cortes Generales. The constituency (whose boundaries correspond to those of the homonymous province) currently elects six deputies. The electoral system uses the D'Hondt method and closed-list proportional voting, with a minimum threshold of three percent.

== Electoral system ==
The constituency was created as per the Political Reform Law and was first contested in the 1977 general election. The Law provided for the provinces of Spain to be established as multi-member districts in the Congress of Deputies, with this regulation being maintained under the Spanish Constitution of 1978. Additionally, the Constitution requires for any modification of the provincial limits to be approved under an organic law, needing an absolute majority in the Cortes Generales.

Voting is based on universal suffrage, comprising all Spanish nationals over 18 years of age with full political rights, provided that they have not been deprived of the right to vote by a final sentence. The only exception was in 1977, when this was limited to nationals over 21 years of age and in full enjoyment of their political and civil rights. Amendments in 2011 required non-resident citizens to apply for voting, a system known as "begged" voting (Spanish: Voto rogado). which was abolished in 2022. Further, amendments in 2018 granted the right to vote to those legally incapacitated. The Congress of Deputies has a minimum of 300 and a maximum of 400 seats, with electoral provisions fixing its size at 350. Of these, 348 are elected in 50 multi-member constituencies corresponding to the provinces of Spain—each of which is assigned an initial minimum of two seats and the remaining 248 distributed in proportion to population—using the D'Hondt method and closed-list proportional voting, with a three percent-threshold of valid votes (including blank ballots) in each constituency. The remaining two seats are allocated to Ceuta and Melilla as single-member districts elected by plurality voting. The use of this electoral method may result in a higher effective threshold depending on district magnitude and vote distribution. The law does not provide for by-elections to fill vacant seats; instead, any vacancies arising after the proclamation of candidates and during the legislative term are filled by the next candidates on the party lists or, when required, by designated substitutes.

The electoral law allows for parties and federations registered in the interior ministry, alliances and groupings of electors to present lists of candidates. Parties and federations intending to form an alliance are required to inform the relevant electoral commission within 10 days of the election call—15 before 1985—whereas groupings of electors need to secure the signature of at least one percent of the electorate in the constituencies for which they seek election—one permille of the electorate, with a compulsory minimum of 500 signatures, until 1985—disallowing electors from signing for more than one list. Also since 2011, parties, federations or alliances that have not obtained a mandate in either chamber of the Cortes at the preceding election are required to secure the signature of at least 0.1 percent of electors in the aforementioned constituencies. Amendments in 2007 required a balanced composition of men and women in the electoral lists, so that candidates of either sex made up at least 40 percent of the total composition; further amendments in 2024 required the use of a zipper system.

== Deputies ==
Deputies 1977–present
Key to parties PSUC ECP Sumar ERC SC PSC–PSOE Junts JxCat–Junts Cs PDC CDC DiL CiU CC–UCD PP CP AP–PDP
Legislature	Election	Distribution
Constituent	1977	1 / 1 / 1 / 2
1st	1979	1 / 2 / 2
2nd	1982	3 / 1 / 1
3rd	1986	2 / 2 / 1
4th	1989	2 / 2 / 1
5th	1993	3 / 2 / 1
6th	1996	3 / 2 / 1
7th	2000	2 / 2 / 2
8th	2004	1 / 3 / 1 / 1
9th	2008	4 / 1 / 1
10th	2011	2 / 2 / 2
11th	2015	1 / 1 / 1 / 1 / 1 / 1
12th	2016	1 / 1 / 1 / 1 / 1 / 1
13th	2019 (Apr)	1 / 2 / 1 / 1 / 1
14th	2019 (Nov)	1 / 2 / 2 / 1
15th	2023	1 / 1 / 2 / 1 / 1

== General elections ==
=== 2026 ===
Summary of the 29 November 2026 Congress of Deputies election results in Tarragona
Parties and alliances	Popular vote			Seats	
Parties and alliances	Votes	%	±pp	Total	+/−
Socialists' Party of Catalonia (PSC–PSOE)					
Republican Left of Catalonia (ERC)					
People's Party (PP)					
Commons–Broad Front (Comuns–Front Ampli)^{1}					
Together for Catalonia (JxCat)					
Vox (Vox)					
Animalist Party with the Environment (PACMA)					
Workers' Front (FO)					
Communist Party of the Workers of Catalonia (PCTC)					
The Party is Over (SALF)			New		
Convergents (CNV)			New		
For a Fairer World (M+J)			New		
At the Same Time (Alhora)			New		
Blank ballots					
Total				6	±0
Valid votes					
Invalid votes					
Votes cast / turnout					
Abstentions					
Registered voters	626,161				
Sources
Footnotes: ^{1} Commons–Broad Front results are compared to the combined totals of Unite–In Common We Can and Zero Cuts in the 2023 election.

=== 2023 ===
Summary of the 23 July 2023 Congress of Deputies election results in Tarragona
Parties and alliances	Popular vote			Seats	
Parties and alliances	Votes	%	±pp	Total	+/−
Socialists' Party of Catalonia (PSC–PSOE)	121,126	32.91	+13.80	2	+1
Republican Left of Catalonia (ERC)	55,461	15.07	–10.56	1	–1
People's Party (PP)	51,061	13.87	+6.11	1	±0
Unite–In Common We Can (Sumar–ECP)^{2}	41,719	11.34	–0.76	1	±0
Together for Catalonia (Junts)^{1}	40,791	11.08	n/a	1	+1
Vox (Vox)	38,039	10.34	+2.26	0	±0
Popular Unity Candidacy–For Rupture (CUP–PR)	8,700	2.36	–3.38	0	±0
Animalist Party with the Environment (PACMA)^{3}	3,797	1.03	–0.16	0	±0
Catalan European Democratic Party–CiU Space (PDeCAT–E–CiU)^{1}	2,311	0.63	n/a	0	–1
Workers' Front (FO)	661	0.18	New	0	±0
Communist Party of the Workers of Catalonia (PCTC)	405	0.11	+0.06	0	±0
Zero Cuts (Recortes Cero)	267	0.07	–0.07	0	±0
Catalonia Among Neighbors (EVR)	265	0.07	New	0	±0
United Yes (Unidos SI)	253	0.07	New	0	±0
Blank ballots	3,168	0.86	+0.16		
Total	368,024			6	±0
Valid votes	368,024	98.82	–0.49		
Invalid votes	4,402	1.18	+0.49		
Votes cast / turnout	372,426	62.42	–5.09		
Abstentions	224,263	37.58	+5.09		
Registered voters	596,689				
Sources
Footnotes: ^{1} Within the Together for Catalonia–Together alliance in the November 2019 election.; ^{2} Unite–In Common We Can results are compared to the combined totals of In Common We Can–Let's Win the Change and More Country in the November 2019 election.; ^{3} Animalist Party with the Environment results are compared to Animalist Party Against Mistreatment of Animals totals in the November 2019 election.

=== November 2019 ===
Summary of the 10 November 2019 Congress of Deputies election results in Tarragona
Parties and alliances	Popular vote			Seats	
Parties and alliances	Votes	%	±pp	Total	+/−
Republican Left of Catalonia–Sovereigntists (ERC–Sobiranistes)	98,782	25.63	–1.60	2	±0
Socialists' Party of Catalonia (PSC–PSOE)	73,641	19.11	–2.33	2	+1
Together for Catalonia–Together (JxCat–Junts)	51,461	13.35	+1.10	1	±0
In Common We Can–Let's Win the Change (ECP–Guanyem el Canvi)	46,644	12.10	–0.09	1	±0
Vox (Vox)	31,124	8.08	+3.27	0	±0
People's Party (PP)	29,923	7.76	+2.65	0	±0
Citizens–Party of the Citizenry (Cs)	22,814	5.92	–6.61	0	–1
Popular Unity Candidacy–For Rupture (CUP–PR)	22,129	5.74	New	0	±0
Animalist Party Against Mistreatment of Animals (PACMA)	4,588	1.19	–0.29	0	±0
Zero Cuts–Green Group (Recortes Cero–GV)	533	0.14	+0.03	0	±0
For a Fairer World (PUM+J)	351	0.09	+0.02	0	±0
Left in Positive (IZQP)	343	0.09	+0.04	0	±0
Communist Party of the Workers of Catalonia (PCTC)	191	0.05	–0.06	0	±0
Communist Party of the Catalan People (PCPC)	180	0.05	–0.01	0	±0
Blank ballots	2,715	0.70	+0.17		
Total	385,419			6	±0
Valid votes	385,419	99.31	–0.08		
Invalid votes	2,669	0.69	+0.08		
Votes cast / turnout	388,088	67.51	–6.08		
Abstentions	186,778	32.49	+6.08		
Registered voters	574,866				

=== April 2019 ===
Summary of the 28 April 2019 Congress of Deputies election results in Tarragona
Parties and alliances	Popular vote			Seats	
Parties and alliances	Votes	%	±pp	Total	+/−
Republican Left of Catalonia–Sovereigntists (ERC–Sobiranistes)	113,887	27.23	+7.57	2	+1
Socialists' Party of Catalonia (PSC–PSOE)	89,650	21.44	+5.78	1	±0
Citizens–Party of the Citizenry (Cs)	52,395	12.53	+1.19	1	±0
Together for Catalonia–Together (JxCat–Junts)^{1}	51,239	12.25	–1.45	1	±0
In Common We Can–Let's Win the Change (ECP–Guanyem el Canvi)	50,979	12.19	–9.67	1	±0
People's Party (PP)	21,376	5.11	–9.76	0	–1
Vox (Vox)	20,105	4.81	New	0	±0
Free People–We Are Alternative–Pirates: Republican Front (Front Republicà)	8,234	1.97	New	0	±0
Animalist Party Against Mistreatment of Animals (PACMA)	6,189	1.48	–0.17	0	±0
Communist Party of the Workers of Catalonia (PCTC)	471	0.11	New	0	±0
Zero Cuts–Green Group (Recortes Cero–GV)	462	0.11	–0.14	0	±0
For a Fairer World (PUM+J)	280	0.07	New	0	±0
Convergents (CNV)	263	0.06	New	0	±0
Communist Party of the Catalan People (PCPC)	260	0.06	–0.06	0	±0
Left in Positive (IZQP)	200	0.05	New	0	±0
Blank ballots	2,202	0.53	–0.36		
Total	418,192			6	±0
Valid votes	418,192	99.39	+0.32		
Invalid votes	2,580	0.61	–0.32		
Votes cast / turnout	420,772	73.59	+11.80		
Abstentions	151,028	26.41	–11.80		
Registered voters	571,800				
Sources
Footnotes: ^{1} Together for Catalonia–Together results are compared to Democratic Convergence of Catalonia totals in the 2016 election.

=== 2016 ===
Summary of the 26 June 2016 Congress of Deputies election results in Tarragona
Parties and alliances	Popular vote			Seats	
Parties and alliances	Votes	%	±pp	Total	+/−
In Common We Can–Let's Win the Change (ECP)	75,328	21.86	+1.22	1	±0
Republican Left–Catalonia Yes (ERC–CatSí)	67,759	19.66	+2.17	1	±0
Socialists' Party of Catalonia (PSC–PSOE)	53,967	15.66	–0.13	1	±0
People's Party (PP)	51,241	14.87	+2.64	1	±0
Democratic Convergence of Catalonia (CDC)^{1}	47,226	13.70	–1.59	1	±0
Citizens–Party of the Citizenry (C's)	39,082	11.34	–2.90	1	±0
Animalist Party Against Mistreatment of Animals (PACMA)	5,680	1.65	+0.53	0	±0
Zero Cuts–Green Group (Recortes Cero–GV)	853	0.25	+0.01	0	±0
Communist Party of the Catalan People (PCPC)	424	0.12	–0.07	0	±0
Blank ballots	3,060	0.89	+0.17		
Total	344,620			6	±0
Valid votes	344,620	99.07	–0.05		
Invalid votes	3,241	0.93	+0.05		
Votes cast / turnout	347,861	61.79	–5.10		
Abstentions	215,129	38.21	+5.10		
Registered voters	562,990				
Sources
Footnotes: ^{1} Democratic Convergence of Catalonia results are compared to Democracy and Freedom totals in the 2015 election.

=== 2015 ===
Summary of the 20 December 2015 Congress of Deputies election results in Tarragona
Parties and alliances	Popular vote			Seats	
Parties and alliances	Votes	%	±pp	Total	+/−
In Common We Can (En Comú)^{1}	77,036	20.64	+15.29	1	+1
Republican Left of Catalonia–Catalonia Yes (ERC–CatSí)	65,272	17.49	+10.07	1	+1
Socialists' Party of Catalonia (PSC–PSOE)	58,922	15.79	–10.31	1	–1
Democracy and Freedom (DiL)^{2}	57,071	15.29	–15.24	1	–1
Citizens–Party of the Citizenry (C's)	53,152	14.24	New	1	+1
People's Party (PP)	45,619	12.23	–11.41	1	–1
Democratic Union of Catalonia (unio.cat)	6,324	1.69	New	0	±0
Animalist Party Against Mistreatment of Animals (PACMA)	4,170	1.12	+0.50	0	±0
Zero Cuts–Green Group (Recortes Cero–GV)	894	0.24	New	0	±0
Communist Party of the Catalan People (PCPC)	705	0.19	–0.02	0	±0
Union, Progress and Democracy (UPyD)	686	0.18	–0.88	0	±0
Blank Seats (EB)	625	0.17	–0.71	0	±0
Blank ballots	2,684	0.72	–1.33		
Total	373,160			6	±0
Valid votes	373,160	99.12	+0.97		
Invalid votes	3,324	0.88	–0.97		
Votes cast / turnout	376,484	66.89	+3.22		
Abstentions	186,315	33.11	–3.22		
Registered voters	562,799				
Sources
Footnotes: ^{1} In Common We Can results are compared to Initiative for Catalonia Greens–United and Alternative Left: Plural L. totals in the 2011 election.; ^{2} Democracy and Freedom results are compared to Convergence and Union totals in the 2011 election.

=== 2011 ===
Summary of the 20 November 2011 Congress of Deputies election results in Tarragona
Parties and alliances	Popular vote			Seats	
Parties and alliances	Votes	%	±pp	Total	+/−
Convergence and Union (CiU)	105,846	30.53	+9.40	2	+1
Socialists' Party of Catalonia (PSC–PSOE)	90,496	26.10	–18.82	2	–2
People's Party (PP)	81,977	23.64	+5.87	2	+1
Republican Left of Catalonia–Rally–Catalonia Yes (ERC–RI.cat)	25,724	7.42	–1.98	0	±0
Initiative for Catalonia Greens–United and Alternative Left: Plural L. (ICV–EUiA)	18,561	5.35	+2.31	0	±0
Union, Progress and Democracy (UPyD)	3,672	1.06	+0.93	0	±0
Platform for Catalonia (PxC)	3,097	0.89	New	0	±0
Blank Seats (EB)	3,046	0.88	+0.77	0	±0
Animalist Party Against Mistreatment of Animals (PACMA)	2,133	0.62	+0.34	0	±0
Pirates of Catalonia (Pirata.cat)	1,703	0.49	New	0	±0
Hartos.org (Hartos.org)	1,069	0.31	New	0	±0
Anti-capitalists (Anticapitalistas)	880	0.25	New	0	±0
Communist Party of the Catalan People (PCPC)	712	0.21	+0.07	0	±0
Left Republican Party–Republicans (PRE–R)	419	0.12	New	0	±0
Communist Unification of Spain (UCE)	267	0.08	New	0	±0
Blank ballots	7,106	2.05	+0.69		
Total	346,708			6	±0
Valid votes	346,708	98.15	–1.10		
Invalid votes	6,536	1.85	+1.10		
Votes cast / turnout	353,244	63.67	–6.20		
Abstentions	201,555	36.33	+6.20		
Registered voters	554,799				

=== 2008 ===
Summary of the 9 March 2008 Congress of Deputies election results in Tarragona
Parties and alliances	Popular vote			Seats	
Parties and alliances	Votes	%	±pp	Total	+/−
Socialists' Party of Catalonia (PSC–PSOE)	169,246	44.92	+9.43	4	+1
Convergence and Union (CiU)	79,601	21.13	–0.42	1	±0
People's Party (PP)	66,945	17.77	+0.75	1	±0
Republican Left of Catalonia (esquerra)	35,433	9.40	–10.43	0	–1
Initiative for Catalonia Greens–United and Alternative Left (ICV–EUiA)	11,448	3.04	–0.78	0	±0
Citizens–Party of the Citizenry (C's)	1,862	0.49	New	0	±0
Anti-Bullfighting Party Against Mistreatment of Animals (PACMA)	1,048	0.28	New	0	±0
Catalan Republican Party (RC)	794	0.21	New	0	±0
Social Democratic Party (PSD)	717	0.19	New	0	±0
Party for Catalonia (PxCat)	675	0.18	New	0	±0
Communist Party of the Catalan People (PCPC)	528	0.14	+0.04	0	±0
Union, Progress and Democracy (UPyD)	498	0.13	New	0	±0
For a Fairer World (PUM+J)	469	0.12	New	0	±0
Unsubmissive Seats–Alternative of Discontented Democrats (Ei–ADD)	420	0.11	+0.07	0	±0
Internationalist Socialist Workers' Party (POSI)	297	0.08	New	0	±0
Republican Left–Left Republican Party (IR–PRE)	235	0.06	±0.00	0	±0
Spanish Phalanx of the CNSO (FE de las JONS)	215	0.06	+0.03	0	±0
Engine and Sports Alternative (AMD)	186	0.05	New	0	±0
National Democracy (DN)	153	0.04	±0.00	0	±0
Family and Life Party (PFiV)	135	0.04	±0.00	0	±0
Humanist Party (PH)	126	0.03	–0.01	0	±0
We Are (N Som)	105	0.03	New	0	±0
National Alliance (AN)	104	0.03	New	0	±0
Spain 2000 (E–2000)	101	0.03	±0.00	0	±0
Carlist Party of Catalonia (PCdeC)	100	0.03	+0.01	0	±0
Authentic Phalanx (FA)	77	0.02	New	0	±0
Internationalist Struggle (LI (LIT–CI))	70	0.02	+0.01	0	±0
Spanish Alternative (AES)	57	0.02	New	0	±0
Blank ballots	5,139	1.36	+0.48		
Total	376,784			6	±0
Valid votes	376,784	99.25	–0.28		
Invalid votes	2,851	0.75	+0.28		
Votes cast / turnout	379,635	69.87	–5.01		
Abstentions	163,748	30.13	+5.01		
Registered voters	543,383				

=== 2004 ===
Summary of the 14 March 2004 Congress of Deputies election results in Tarragona
Parties and alliances	Popular vote			Seats	
Parties and alliances	Votes	%	±pp	Total	+/−
Socialists' Party of Catalonia (PSC–PSOE)	136,660	35.49	+3.08	3	+1
Convergence and Union (CiU)	82,954	21.55	–9.52	1	–1
Republican Left of Catalonia (ERC)	76,330	19.83	+13.69	1	+1
People's Party (PP)	65,528	17.02	–7.32	1	–1
Initiative for Catalonia Greens–United and Alternative Left (ICV–EUiA)^{1}	14,694	3.82	+0.32	0	±0
The Greens–The Ecologist Alternative (EV–AE)	2,618	0.68	New	0	±0
Communist Party of the Catalan People (PCPC)	396	0.10	New	0	±0
Internationalist Socialist Workers' Party (POSI)	377	0.10	–0.01	0	±0
Citizens for Blank Votes (CenB)	350	0.09	New	0	±0
Republican Left–Left Republican Party (IR–PRE)	227	0.06	–0.02	0	±0
Democratic and Social Centre (CDS)	200	0.05	–0.02	0	±0
Unsubmissive Seats–Alternative of Discontented Democrats (Ei–ADD)	169	0.04	New	0	±0
Humanist Party (PH)	160	0.04	–0.01	0	±0
Family and Life Party (PFiV)	155	0.04	New	0	±0
National Democracy (DN)	151	0.04	New	0	±0
The Phalanx (FE)	122	0.03	–0.04	0	±0
Spain 2000 (E–2000)	117	0.03	±0.00	0	±0
Spanish Phalanx of the CNSO (FE de las JONS)	116	0.03	New	0	±0
Spanish Democratic Party (PADE)	83	0.02	±0.00	0	±0
Carlist Party of Catalonia (PCdeC)	61	0.02	New	0	±0
Caló Nationalist Party (PNCA)	58	0.02	–0.02	0	±0
Republican Social Movement (MSR)	56	0.01	New	0	±0
Internationalist Struggle (LI (LIT–CI))	33	0.01	–0.03	0	±0
Blank ballots	3,398	0.88	–0.44		
Total	385,013			6	±0
Valid votes	385,013	99.53	+0.28		
Invalid votes	1,828	0.47	–0.28		
Votes cast / turnout	386,841	74.88	+10.27		
Abstentions	129,743	25.12	–10.27		
Registered voters	516,584				
Sources
Footnotes: ^{1} Initiative for Catalonia Greens–United and Alternative Left results are compared to the combined totals of Initiative for Catalonia–Greens and United and Alternative Left in the 2000 election.

=== 2000 ===
Summary of the 12 March 2000 Congress of Deputies election results in Tarragona
Parties and alliances	Popular vote			Seats	
Parties and alliances	Votes	%	±pp	Total	+/−
Socialists' Party of Catalonia (PSC–PSOE)	101,817	32.41	–5.67	2	–1
Convergence and Union (CiU)	97,616	31.07	+0.30	2	±0
People's Party (PP)	76,468	24.34	+4.28	2	+1
Republican Left of Catalonia (ERC)	19,277	6.14	+1.22	0	±0
Initiative for Catalonia–Greens (IC–V)	6,585	2.10	–2.93	0	±0
United and Alternative Left (EUiA)	4,405	1.40	New	0	±0
The Greens–Green Alternative (EV–AV)	1,240	0.39	New	0	±0
Liberal Independent Group (GIL)	455	0.14	New	0	±0
Internationalist Socialist Workers' Party (POSI)	353	0.11	New	0	±0
Republican Left–Left Republican Party (IR–PRE)	266	0.08	New	0	±0
Catalan State (EC)	251	0.08	New	0	±0
Centrist Union–Democratic and Social Centre (UC–CDS)	220	0.07	+0.02	0	±0
The Phalanx (FE)	218	0.07	New	0	±0
Humanist Party (PH)	167	0.05	+0.01	0	±0
Natural Law Party (PLN)	167	0.05	New	0	±0
Caló Nationalist Party (PNCA)	132	0.04	New	0	±0
Internationalist Struggle (LI (LIT–CI))	126	0.04	New	0	±0
Spain 2000 Platform (ES2000)	96	0.03	New	0	±0
Democratic Party of the People (PDEP)	85	0.03	New	0	±0
Spanish Democratic Party (PADE)	74	0.02	New	0	±0
Blank ballots	4,136	1.32	+0.70		
Total	314,154			6	±0
Valid votes	314,154	99.25	–0.23		
Invalid votes	2,374	0.75	+0.23		
Votes cast / turnout	316,528	64.61	–11.11		
Abstentions	173,393	35.39	+11.11		
Registered voters	489,921				

=== 1996 ===
Summary of the 3 March 1996 Congress of Deputies election results in Tarragona
Parties and alliances	Popular vote			Seats	
Parties and alliances	Votes	%	±pp	Total	+/−
Socialists' Party of Catalonia (PSC–PSOE)	133,000	38.08	+4.99	3	±0
Convergence and Union (CiU)	107,473	30.77	–1.28	2	±0
People's Party (PP)	70,045	20.06	+0.25	1	±0
Initiative for Catalonia–The Greens (IC–EV)	17,558	5.03	–0.03	0	±0
Republican Left of Catalonia (ERC)	17,187	4.92	–1.66	0	±0
The European Greens–Ecologist Alternative of Catalonia (EVE–AEC)^{1}	967	0.28	–0.37	0	±0
Workers' Revolutionary Party (PRT)^{2}	242	0.07	–0.18	0	±0
Authentic Spanish Phalanx (FEA)	206	0.06	New	0	±0
Centrist Union (UC)	158	0.05	–0.67	0	±0
Citizen Independent Platform of Catalonia (PICC)	145	0.04	New	0	±0
Humanist Party (PH)	127	0.04	+0.01	0	±0
Revolutionary Workers' Party (POR)	0	0.00	–0.08	0	±0
Blank ballots	2,152	0.62	–0.13		
Total	349,260			6	±0
Valid votes	349,260	99.48	+0.06		
Invalid votes	1,829	0.52	–0.06		
Votes cast / turnout	351,089	75.72	+1.25		
Abstentions	112,593	24.28	–1.25		
Registered voters	463,682				
Sources
Footnotes: ^{1} The European Greens–Ecologist Alternative of Catalonia results are compared to The Greens–Ecologist Confederation of Catalonia totals in the 1993 election.; ^{2} Workers' Revolutionary Party results are compared to Workers' Socialist Party totals in the 1993 election.

=== 1993 ===
Summary of the 6 June 1993 Congress of Deputies election results in Tarragona
Parties and alliances	Popular vote			Seats	
Parties and alliances	Votes	%	±pp	Total	+/−
Socialists' Party of Catalonia (PSC–PSOE)	105,981	33.09	–1.09	3	+1
Convergence and Union (CiU)	102,629	32.05	–2.01	2	±0
People's Party (PP)	63,433	19.81	+6.71	1	±0
Republican Left of Catalonia (ERC)	21,063	6.58	+3.44	0	±0
Initiative for Catalonia (IC)	16,190	5.06	–0.24	0	±0
Democratic and Social Centre (CDS)	2,301	0.72	–3.24	0	±0
The Greens–Ecologist Confederation of Catalonia (EV–CEC)^{1}	2,086	0.65	–0.60	0	±0
Ecologist Party of Catalonia–VERDE (PEC–VERDE)	1,070	0.33	–0.12	0	±0
Workers' Socialist Party (PST)	805	0.25	–0.11	0	±0
Ruiz-Mateos Group–European Democratic Alliance (ARM–ADE)	801	0.25	–1.00	0	±0
The Ecologists (LE)	743	0.23	–0.34	0	±0
Revolutionary Workers' Party (POR)	244	0.08	–0.07	0	±0
Natural Law Party (PLN)	161	0.05	New	0	±0
Spanish Phalanx of the CNSO (FE–JONS)	134	0.04	–0.04	0	±0
Humanist Party (PH)	109	0.03	–0.02	0	±0
Coalition for a New Socialist Party (CNPS)^{2}	106	0.03	–0.02	0	±0
Communist Unification of Spain (UCE)	0	0.00	New	0	±0
Blank ballots	2,398	0.75	+0.13		
Total	320,254			6	+1
Valid votes	320,254	99.42	–0.01		
Invalid votes	1,863	0.58	+0.01		
Votes cast / turnout	322,117	74.47	+7.49		
Abstentions	110,438	25.53	–7.49		
Registered voters	432,555				
Sources
Footnotes: ^{1} The Greens–Ecologist Confederation of Catalonia results are compared to the combined totals of Green Alternative–Ecologist Movement of Catalonia and The Greens–Green List in the 1989 election.; ^{2} Coalition for a New Socialist Party results are compared to Alliance for the Republic totals in the 1989 election.

=== 1989 ===
Summary of the 29 October 1989 Congress of Deputies election results in Tarragona
Parties and alliances	Popular vote			Seats	
Parties and alliances	Votes	%	±pp	Total	+/−
Socialists' Party of Catalonia (PSC–PSOE)	93,456	34.18	–3.71	2	±0
Convergence and Union (CiU)	93,110	34.06	+2.28	2	±0
People's Party (PP)^{1}	35,813	13.10	–2.56	1	±0
Initiative for Catalonia (IC)^{2}	14,478	5.30	+1.42	0	±0
Democratic and Social Centre (CDS)	10,829	3.96	–0.14	0	±0
Republican Left of Catalonia (ERC)	8,593	3.14	+0.53	0	±0
Ruiz-Mateos Group (Ruiz-Mateos)	3,404	1.25	New	0	±0
Green Alternative–Ecologist Movement of Catalonia (AV–MEC)^{3}	2,056	0.75	–0.19	0	±0
Party of the Communists of Catalonia (PCC)	2,040	0.75	–0.29	0	±0
The Ecologist Greens (EVE)	1,550	0.57	New	0	±0
The Greens–Green List (EV–LV)	1,355	0.50	New	0	±0
Ecologist Party of Catalonia–VERDE (PEC–VERDE)	1,221	0.45	New	0	±0
Workers' Party of Spain–Communist Unity (PTE–UC)^{4}	1,135	0.42	–0.01	0	±0
Workers' Socialist Party (PST)	977	0.36	–0.08	0	±0
Social Democratic Coalition (CSD)^{5}	603	0.22	–0.03	0	±0
Revolutionary Workers' Party of Spain (PORE)	318	0.12	–0.01	0	±0
Spanish Phalanx of the CNSO (FE–JONS)	222	0.08	New	0	±0
Centrist Unity–Democratic Spanish Party (PED)	155	0.06	New	0	±0
Alliance for the Republic (AxR)^{6}	145	0.05	–0.06	0	±0
Humanist Party of Catalonia (PHC)	132	0.05	New	0	±0
Valencian Nationalist Left–Valencian Regional Union (ENV–URV)	127	0.05	New	0	±0
Blank ballots	1,684	0.62	+0.13		
Total	273,403			5	±0
Valid votes	273,403	99.43	+0.64		
Invalid votes	1,570	0.57	–0.64		
Votes cast / turnout	274,973	66.98	–1.96		
Abstentions	135,541	33.02	+1.96		
Registered voters	410,514				
Sources
Footnotes: ^{1} People's Party results are compared to People's Coalition totals in the 1986 election.; ^{2} Initiative for Catalonia results are compared to Union of the Catalan Left totals in the 1986 election.; ^{3} Green Alternative–Ecologist Movement of Catalonia results are compared to Green Alternative List totals in the 1986 election.; ^{4} Workers' Party of Spain–Communist Unity results are compared to Communists' Unity Board totals in the 1986 election.; ^{5} Social Democratic Coalition results are compared to Social Democratic Party of Catalonia totals in the 1986 election.; ^{6} Alliance for the Republic results are compared to Internationalist Socialist Workers' Party totals in the 1986 election.

=== 1986 ===
Summary of the 22 June 1986 Congress of Deputies election results in Tarragona
Parties and alliances	Popular vote			Seats	
Parties and alliances	Votes	%	±pp	Total	+/−
Socialists' Party of Catalonia (PSC–PSOE)	105,261	37.89	–4.20	2	–1
Convergence and Union (CiU)	88,278	31.78	+11.00	2	+1
People's Coalition (AP–PDP–PL)^{1}	43,499	15.66	–2.13	1	±0
Democratic and Social Centre (CDS)	11,376	4.10	+1.66	0	±0
Union of the Catalan Left (PSUC–ENE)^{2}	10,788	3.88	–1.47	0	±0
Republican Left of Catalonia (ERC)	7,240	2.61	–1.35	0	±0
Party of the Communists of Catalonia (PCC)	2,899	1.04	+0.22	0	±0
Green Alternative List (LAV)	2,603	0.94	New	0	±0
Workers' Socialist Party (PST)	1,218	0.44	–0.18	0	±0
Communists' Unity Board (MUC)	1,196	0.43	New	0	±0
Social Democratic Party of Catalonia (PSDC)	689	0.25	New	0	±0
Communist Unification of Spain (UCE)	457	0.16	+0.09	0	±0
Revolutionary Workers' Party of Spain (PORE)	349	0.13	New	0	±0
Internationalist Socialist Workers' Party (POSI)	293	0.11	New	0	±0
Republican Popular Unity (UPR)^{3}	287	0.10	+0.04	0	±0
Blank ballots	1,351	0.49	+0.10		
Total	277,784			5	±0
Valid votes	277,784	98.79	+0.68		
Invalid votes	3,392	1.21	–0.68		
Votes cast / turnout	281,176	68.94	–9.68		
Abstentions	126,707	31.06	+9.68		
Registered voters	407,883				
Sources
Footnotes: ^{1} People's Coalition results are compared to People's Alliance–People's Democratic Party totals in the 1982 election.; ^{2} Union of the Catalan Left results are compared to Unified Socialist Party of Catalonia totals in the 1982 election.; ^{3} Republican Popular Unity results are compared to Communist Party of Spain (Marxist–Leninist) totals in the 1982 election.

=== 1982 ===
Summary of the 28 October 1982 Congress of Deputies election results in Tarragona
Parties and alliances	Popular vote			Seats	
Parties and alliances	Votes	%	±pp	Total	+/−
Socialists' Party of Catalonia (PSC–PSOE)	120,880	42.09	+13.27	3	+1
Convergence and Union (CiU)	59,677	20.78	+6.74	1	+1
People's Alliance–People's Democratic Party (AP–PDP)^{1}	51,098	17.79	+13.76	1	+1
Unified Socialist Party of Catalonia (PSUC–PCE)	13,313	4.64	–9.60	0	–1
Centrists of Catalonia (CC–UCD)	12,535	4.36	–23.86	0	–2
Republican Left of Catalonia (ERC)	11,361	3.96	–0.63	0	±0
Democratic and Social Centre (CDS)	7,009	2.44	New	0	±0
Party of the Communists of Catalonia (PCC)	2,349	0.82	New	0	±0
Left Nationalists (NE)	2,042	0.71	New	0	±0
Workers' Socialist Party (PST)	1,779	0.62	New	0	±0
New Force (FN)^{2}	1,281	0.45	–0.48	0	±0
Socialist Party of Andalusia–Andalusian Party (PSA–PA)	719	0.25	New	0	±0
Communist Front of Catalonia (FCC)^{3}	484	0.17	+0.02	0	±0
Communist Workers' Party of Catalonia (PCOC)	444	0.15	New	0	±0
Spanish Solidarity (SE)	311	0.11	New	0	±0
Conservatives of Catalonia (CiC)	229	0.08	New	0	±0
Communist Unification of Spain (UCE)	209	0.07	New	0	±0
Communist Party of Spain (Marxist–Leninist) (PCE (m–l))	183	0.06	New	0	±0
Falangist Movement of Spain (MFE)	171	0.06	New	0	±0
Communist League–Internationalist Socialist Workers' Coalition (LC (COSI))	0	0.00	New	0	±0
Spanish Phalanx of the CNSO (FE–JONS)	0	0.00	New	0	±0
Blank ballots	1,115	0.39	+0.15		
Total	287,189			5	±0
Valid votes	287,189	98.11	+0.42		
Invalid votes	5,547	1.89	–0.42		
Votes cast / turnout	292,736	78.62	+11.01		
Abstentions	79,593	21.38	–11.01		
Registered voters	372,329				
Sources
Footnotes: ^{1} People's Alliance–People's Democratic Party results are compared to Democratic Coalition totals in the 1979 election.; ^{2} New Force results are compared to National Union totals in the 1979 election.; ^{3} Communist Front of Catalonia results are compared to Revolutionary Communist League totals in the 1979 election.

=== 1979 ===
Summary of the 1 March 1979 Congress of Deputies election results in Tarragona
Parties and alliances	Popular vote			Seats	
Parties and alliances	Votes	%	±pp	Total	+/−
Socialists' Party of Catalonia (PSC–PSOE)^{1}	71,417	28.82	+5.10	2	+1
Centrists of Catalonia (CC–UCD)^{2}	69,926	28.22	+0.90	2	±0
Unified Socialist Party of Catalonia (PSUC–PCE)	35,283	14.24	–2.13	1	±0
Convergence and Union (CiU)^{3}	34,792	14.04	–6.28	0	–1
Republican Left of Catalonia–National Front of Catalonia (ERC–FNC)^{4}	11,382	4.59	+0.29	0	±0
Democratic Coalition (CD)^{5}	9,998	4.03	–1.99	0	±0
National Union (UN)	2,311	0.93	New	0	±0
Left Bloc for National Liberation (BEAN)	2,117	0.85	New	0	±0
Workers' Communist Party (PCT)	1,746	0.70	New	0	±0
Carlist Party (PC)	1,622	0.65	New	0	±0
Communist Movement–Organization of Communist Left (MC–OIC)	1,295	0.52	New	0	±0
Party of Labour of Catalonia (PTC–PTE)	1,201	0.48	New	0	±0
Republican Left (IR)	1,099	0.44	New	0	±0
Workers' Revolutionary Organization (ORT)^{6}	1,038	0.42	–0.03	0	±0
Communist Organization of Spain (Red Flag) (OCE–BR)	921	0.37	New	0	±0
Spanish Phalanx of the CNSO (Authentic) (FE–JONS(A))	410	0.17	New	0	±0
Revolutionary Communist League (LCR)^{7}	375	0.15	–0.73	0	±0
Union for the Freedom of Speech (ULE)	291	0.12	New	0	±0
Spanish Phalanx–Falangist Unity (FE–UF)	0	0.00	New	0	±0
Blank ballots	591	0.24	+0.03		
Total	247,815			5	±0
Valid votes	247,815	98.53	+0.42		
Invalid votes	3,685	1.47	–0.42		
Votes cast / turnout	251,500	67.61	–10.00		
Abstentions	120,505	32.39	+10.00		
Registered voters	372,005				
Sources
Footnotes: ^{1} Socialists' Party of Catalonia results are compared to Socialists of Catalonia totals in the 1977 election.; ^{2} Centrists of Catalonia results are compared to Union of the Democratic Centre totals in the 1977 election.; ^{3} Convergence and Union results are compared to the combined totals of Democratic Pact for Catalonia and Union of the Centre and Christian Democracy of Catalonia in the 1977 election.; ^{4} Republican Left of Catalonia–National Front of Catalonia results are compared to Left of Catalonia–Democratic Electoral Front totals in the 1977 election.; ^{5} Democratic Coalition results are compared to Catalan Coexistence–People's Alliance totals in the 1977 election.; ^{6} Workers' Revolutionary Organization results are compared to Workers' Electoral Group totals in the 1977 election.; ^{7} Revolutionary Communist League results are compared to Front for Workers' Unity totals in the 1977 election.

=== 1977 ===
Summary of the 15 June 1977 Congress of Deputies election results in Tarragona
Parties and alliances	Popular vote			Seats	
Parties and alliances	Votes	%	±pp	Total	+/−
Union of the Democratic Centre (UCD)	69,014	27.32	n/a	2	n/a
Socialists of Catalonia (PSC–PSOE)	59,926	23.72	n/a	1	n/a
Unified Socialist Party of Catalonia (PSUC–PCE)	41,345	16.37	n/a	1	n/a
Democratic Pact for Catalonia (PDC)	37,146	14.70	n/a	1	n/a
Catalan Coexistence–People's Alliance (CC–AP)	15,216	6.02	n/a	0	n/a
Union of the Centre and Christian Democracy of Catalonia (UCiDCC)	14,199	5.62	n/a	0	n/a
Left of Catalonia–Democratic Electoral Front (EC–FED)	10,864	4.30	n/a	0	n/a
Front for Workers' Unity (FUT)	2,219	0.88	n/a	0	n/a
Workers' Electoral Group (AET)	1,141	0.45	n/a	0	n/a
Spanish Phalanx of the CNSO (Authentic) (FE–JONS(A))	716	0.28	n/a	0	n/a
Proverist Party (PPr)	298	0.12	n/a	0	n/a
Blank ballots	540	0.21	n/a		
Total	252,624			5	n/a
Valid votes	252,624	98.11	n/a		
Invalid votes	4,856	1.89	n/a		
Votes cast / turnout	257,480	77.61	n/a		
Abstentions	74,264	22.39	n/a		
Registered voters	331,744				

== Bibliography ==
- Ley 1/1977, de 4 de enero, para la Reforma Política (Fundamental Law 1/1977). Official State Gazette (in Spanish). 4 January 1977. BOE-A-1977-165.
- Real Decreto-ley 20/1977, de 18 de marzo, sobre Normas Electorales (Royal Decree-Law 20/1977). Official State Gazette (in Spanish). 18 March 1977. BOE-A-1977-7445.
- Constitución Española (Constitution). Official State Gazette (in Spanish). 27 December 1978. BOE-A-1978-31229.
- Ley Orgánica 5/1985, de 19 de junio, del Régimen Electoral General (Organic Law 5/1985). Official State Gazette (in Spanish). 19 June 1985. BOE-A-1985-11672.
- Carreras de Odriozola, Albert; Tafunell Sambola, Xavier (2005) [1989]. Estadísticas históricas de España, siglos XIX-XX (PDF) (in Spanish). Vol. 1 (II ed.). Bilbao: Fundación BBVA. pp. 1072–1097. ISBN 84-96515-00-1. Archived from the original (PDF) on 24 September 2015.
