= Josep Maria Triginer =

Spanish Catalan political activist (1943–2026)

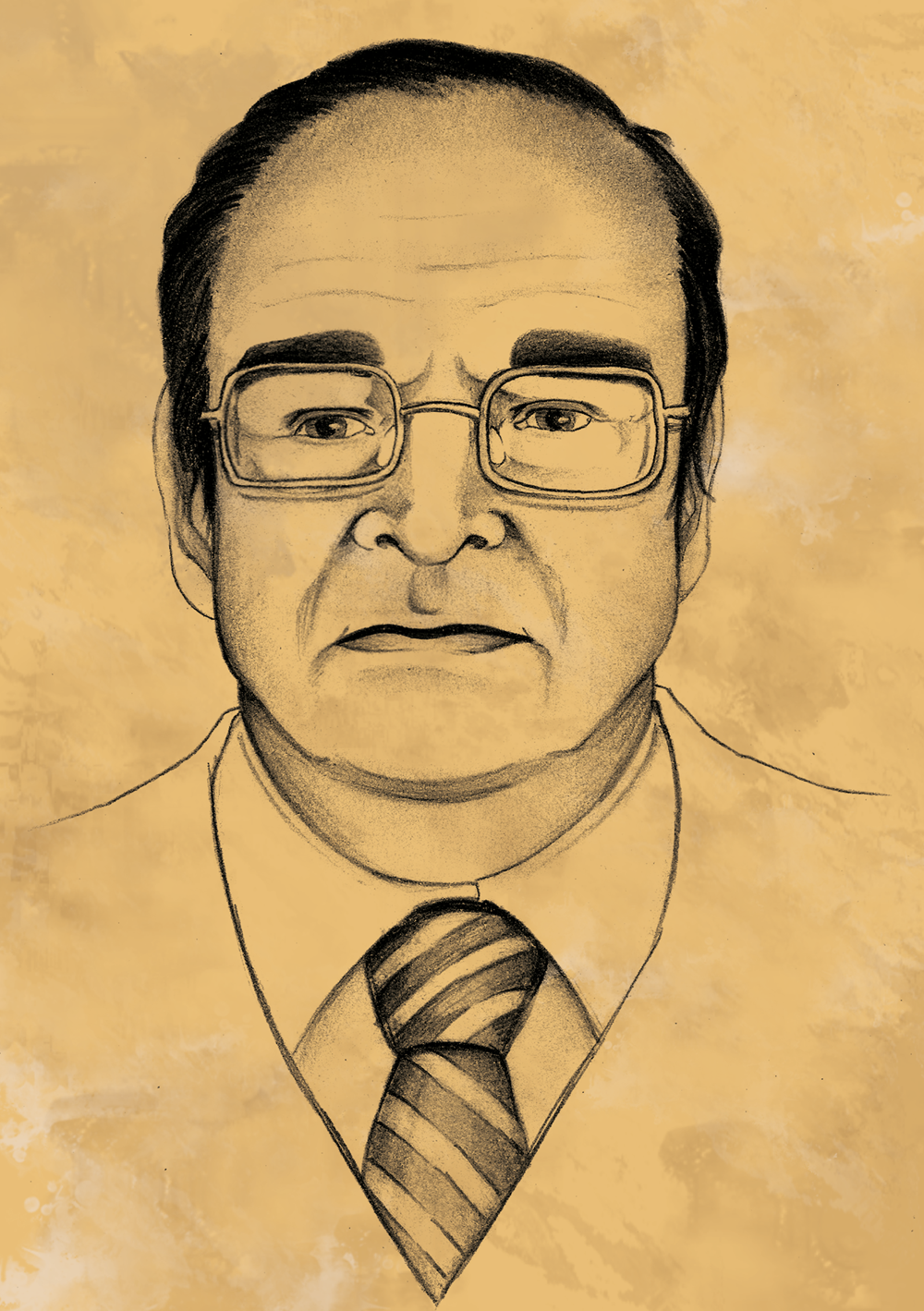
- Born: Josep Maria Triginer Fernández; 11 June 1943; Agramunt, Spain
- Died: 9 January 2026 (aged 82); Barcelona, Spain
- Occupation: Politician
- Years active: 1962–1993

Josep Maria Triginer Fernández (11 June 1943 – 9 January 2026) was a Spanish politician activist.

== Life and career ==
Triginer was born in Agramunt, Spain, on 11 June 1943. In 1961, he studied industrial engineering in Terrassa and joined the Socialist Youth of Spain in 1962. He became the first secretary of Catalan Federation of the PSOE. Alongside his political activity, he worked for other companies around Spain.

Triginer played a prominent role in the negotiations that led to the formation of a unified socialist candidacy for the 1977 Spanish general election. When all the Catalan socialist branches finally united to form Socialists' Party of Catalonia, Triginer became one of its members. He also represented the PSC at the signing of the Moncloa Pacts. In 1978, he was the member of the Commission of Twenty, which in 1978 was responsible for drafting the Statute of Catalonia at the Sau Parador, in the Les Masies de Roda, in Osona.

He was a minister in the Provisional Generalitat between 1977 and 1980, as well as a deputy for the province of Barcelona in 1977, 1979, 1982 and 1986 which he was 2nd on the PSOE list, after Joan Reventós. He later left politics in 1993.

Triginer died in Barcelona on 9 January 2026, at the age of 82.
