= Barcelona (Congress of Deputies constituency) =

Electoral constituency in Spain

Coordinates: 41°27′N 2°5′E

- Congress of Deputies; Electoral constituency
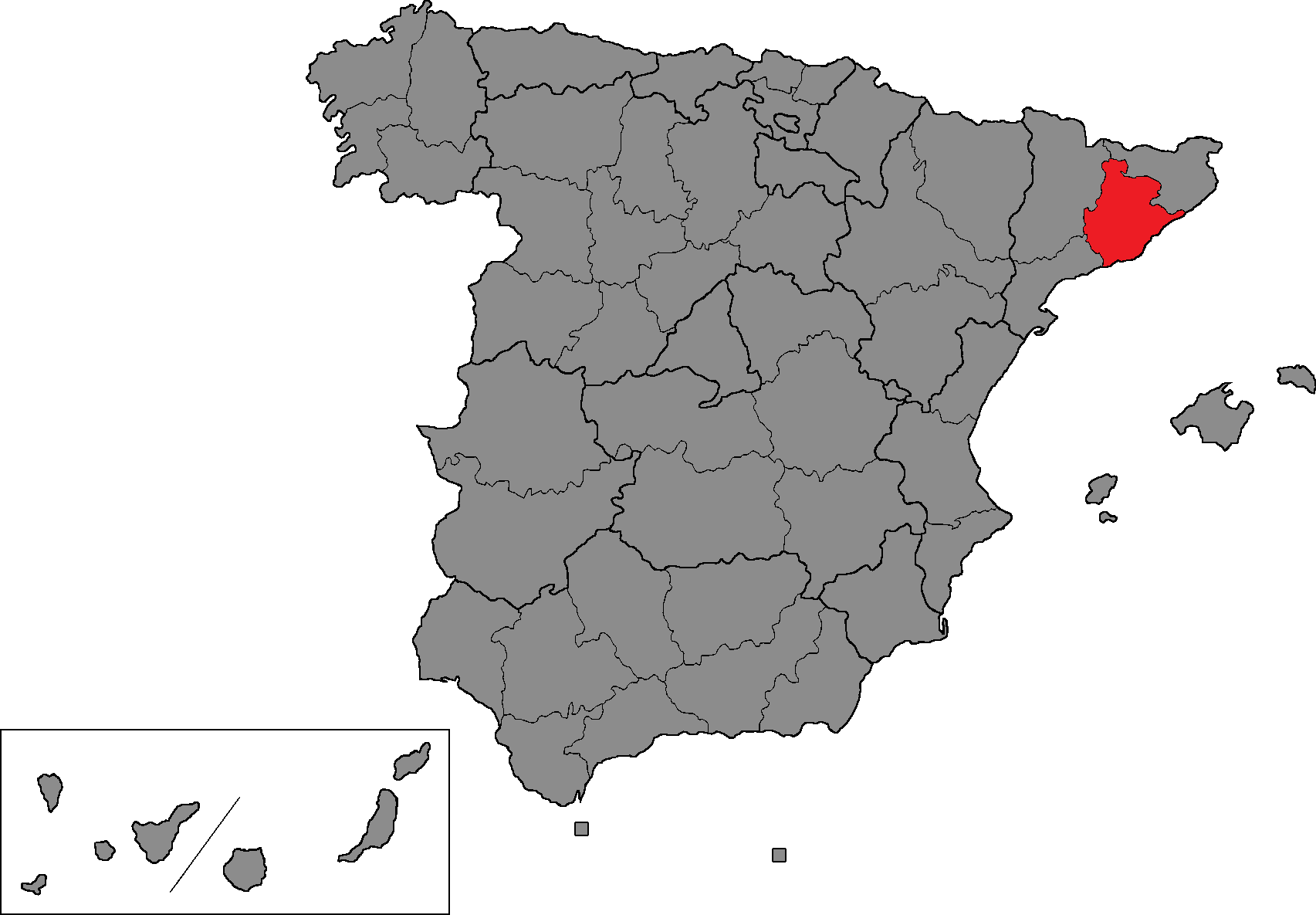
- Location of Barcelona within Spain
- Province: Barcelona
- Autonomous community: Catalonia
- Population: ▲5,899,063 (2024)
- Electorate: ▲4,243,500 (2023)
- Major settlements: Barcelona, Hospitalet de Llobregat, Badalona, Terrassa, Sabadell, Mataró, Santa Coloma de Gramenet

Current constituency
- Created: 1977
- Seats: 33 (1977–1989); 32 (1989–1996); 31 (1996–2019); 32 (2019–present)
- Members: PSC (13); Sumar−ECP (5); PP (5); ERC (4); Junts (3); Vox (2)

Barcelona is one of the 52 constituencies represented in the Congress of Deputies, the lower chamber of the Spanish parliament, the Cortes Generales. The constituency (whose boundaries correspond to those of the homonymous province) currently elects 32 deputies. The electoral system uses the D'Hondt method and closed-list proportional voting, with a minimum threshold of three percent.

== Electoral system ==
The constituency was created as per the Political Reform Law and was first contested in the 1977 general election. The Law provided for the provinces of Spain to be established as multi-member districts in the Congress of Deputies, with this regulation being maintained under the Spanish Constitution of 1978. Additionally, the Constitution requires for any modification of the provincial limits to be approved under an organic law, needing an absolute majority in the Cortes Generales.

Voting is based on universal suffrage, comprising all Spanish nationals over 18 years of age with full political rights, provided that they have not been deprived of the right to vote by a final sentence. The only exception was in 1977, when this was limited to nationals over 21 years of age and in full enjoyment of their political and civil rights. Amendments in 2011 required non-resident citizens to apply for voting, a system known as "begged" voting (Spanish: Voto rogado). which was abolished in 2022. Further, amendments in 2018 granted the right to vote to those legally incapacitated. The Congress of Deputies has a minimum of 300 and a maximum of 400 seats, with electoral provisions fixing its size at 350. Of these, 348 are elected in 50 multi-member constituencies corresponding to the provinces of Spain—each of which is assigned an initial minimum of two seats and the remaining 248 distributed in proportion to population—using the D'Hondt method and closed-list proportional voting, with a three percent-threshold of valid votes (including blank ballots) in each constituency. The remaining two seats are allocated to Ceuta and Melilla as single-member districts elected by plurality voting. The use of this electoral method may result in a higher effective threshold depending on district magnitude and vote distribution. The law does not provide for by-elections to fill vacant seats; instead, any vacancies arising after the proclamation of candidates and during the legislative term are filled by the next candidates on the party lists or, when required, by designated substitutes.

The electoral law allows for parties and federations registered in the interior ministry, alliances and groupings of electors to present lists of candidates. Parties and federations intending to form an alliance are required to inform the relevant electoral commission within 10 days of the election call—15 before 1985—whereas groupings of electors need to secure the signature of at least one percent of the electorate in the constituencies for which they seek election—one permille of the electorate, with a compulsory minimum of 500 signatures, until 1985—disallowing electors from signing for more than one list. Also since 2011, parties, federations or alliances that have not obtained a mandate in either chamber of the Cortes at the preceding election are required to secure the signature of at least 0.1 percent of electors in the aforementioned constituencies. Amendments in 2007 required a balanced composition of men and women in the electoral lists, so that candidates of either sex made up at least 40 percent of the total composition; further amendments in 2024 required the use of a zipper system.

== Deputies ==
Deputies 1977–present
Key to parties CUP–PR PSUC UEC ICV/ICV–EUiA ECP Sumar EC–FED ERC SC PSC–PSOE Junts JxCat–Junts CDS Cs PDC CDC DiL CiU UCiDCC UCD/CC–UCD PP CP CD AP CC–AP Vox
Legislature	Election	Distribution
Constituent	1977	7 / 1 / 11 / 6 / 2 / 5 / 1
1st	1979	7 / 1 / 12 / 6 / 6 / 1
2nd	1982	1 / 1 / 18 / 8 / 5
3rd	1986	1 / 16 / 1 / 11 / 4
4th	1989	3 / 14 / 1 / 11 / 3
5th	1993	3 / 1 / 12 / 10 / 6
6th	1996	2 / 1 / 13 / 9 / 6
7th	2000	1 / 1 / 12 / 9 / 8
8th	2004	2 / 4 / 14 / 6 / 5
9th	2008	1 / 2 / 16 / 6 / 6
10th	2011	3 / 2 / 10 / 9 / 7
11th	2015	9 / 5 / 5 / 4 / 4 / 4
12th	2016	9 / 5 / 5 / 4 / 4 / 4
13th	2019 (Apr)	6 / 8 / 9 / 3 / 4 / 1 / 1
14th	2019 (Nov)	2 / 5 / 7 / 8 / 4 / 2 / 2 / 2
15th	2023	5 / 4 / 13 / 3 / 5 / 2

== General elections ==
=== 2026 ===
Summary of the 29 November 2026 Congress of Deputies election results in Barcelona
Parties and alliances	Popular vote			Seats	
Parties and alliances	Votes	%	±pp	Total	+/−
Socialists' Party of Catalonia (PSC–PSOE)					
Commons–Broad Front (Comuns–Front Ampli)^{1}					
People's Party (PP)					
Republican Left of Catalonia (ERC)					
Together for Catalonia (JxCat)					
Vox (Vox)					
Workers' Front (FO)					
Communist Party of the Workers of Catalonia (PCTC)					
The Party is Over (SALF)			New		
Democracy for the 21st Century (D21)			New		
At the Same Time (Alhora)			New		
Blank ballots					
Total				32	±0
Valid votes					
Invalid votes					
Votes cast / turnout					
Abstentions					
Registered voters	4,398,757				
Sources
Footnotes: ^{1} Commons–Broad Front results are compared to the combined totals of Unite–In Common We Can and Zero Cuts in the 2023 election.

=== 2023 ===
Summary of the 23 July 2023 Congress of Deputies election results in Barcelona
Parties and alliances	Popular vote			Seats	
Parties and alliances	Votes	%	±pp	Total	+/−
Socialists' Party of Catalonia (PSC–PSOE)	952,347	35.70	+13.90	13	+5
Unite–In Common We Can (Sumar–ECP)^{1}	405,993	15.22	–1.66	5	±0
People's Party (PP)	367,519	13.78	+6.07	5	+3
Republican Left of Catalonia (ERC)	328,697	12.32	–8.82	4	–3
Together for Catalonia (Junts)^{2}	258,159	9.68	n/a	3	±0
Vox (Vox)	201,775	7.56	+1.25	2	±0
Popular Unity Candidacy–For Rupture (CUP–PR)	67,266	2.52	–3.60	0	–2
Animalist Party with the Environment (PACMA)^{3}	28,201	1.06	–0.13	0	±0
Catalan European Democratic Party–CiU Space (PDeCAT–E–CiU)^{2}	24,452	0.92	n/a	0	–1
Workers' Front (FO)	6,048	0.23	New	0	±0
Zero Cuts (Recortes Cero)	3,104	0.12	–0.04	0	±0
Communist Party of the Workers of Catalonia (PCTC)	2,858	0.11	+0.06	0	±0
Citizens–Party of the Citizenry (Cs)	n/a	n/a	–5.95	0	–2
Blank ballots	21,059	0.79	+0.09		
Total	2,667,478			32	±0
Valid votes	2,667,478	99.21	–0.29		
Invalid votes	21,242	0.79	+0.29		
Votes cast / turnout	2,688,720	63.36	–6.68		
Abstentions	1,554,780	36.64	+6.68		
Registered voters	4,243,500				
Sources
Footnotes: ^{1} Unite–In Common We Can results are compared to the combined totals of In Common We Can–Let's Win the Change and More Country in the November 2019 election.; ^{2} Within the Together for Catalonia–Together alliance in the November 2019 election.; ^{3} Animalist Party with the Environment results are compared to Animalist Party Against Mistreatment of Animals totals in the November 2019 election.

=== November 2019 ===
Summary of the 10 November 2019 Congress of Deputies election results in Barcelona
Parties and alliances	Popular vote			Seats	
Parties and alliances	Votes	%	±pp	Total	+/−
Socialists' Party of Catalonia (PSC–PSOE)	638,319	21.80	–2.86	8	–1
Republican Left of Catalonia–Sovereigntists (ERC–Sobiranistes)	618,909	21.14	–1.83	7	–1
In Common We Can–Let's Win the Change (ECP–Guanyem el Canvi)	452,482	15.45	–0.86	5	–1
Together for Catalonia–Together (JxCat–Junts)	343,931	11.75	+1.59	4	+1
People's Party (PP)	225,645	7.71	+2.71	2	+1
Vox (Vox)	184,715	6.31	+2.72	2	+1
Popular Unity Candidacy–For Rupture (CUP–PR)	179,041	6.12	New	2	+2
Citizens–Party of the Citizenry (Cs)	174,124	5.95	–6.03	2	–2
More Country (Más País)	41,826	1.43	New	0	±0
Animalist Party Against Mistreatment of Animals (PACMA)	34,752	1.19	–0.43	0	±0
Zero Cuts–Green Group (Recortes Cero–GV)	4,698	0.16	–0.03	0	±0
Feminist Initiative (IFem)	3,005	0.10	New	0	±0
Communist Party of the Workers of Catalonia (PCTC)	1,587	0.05	–0.01	0	±0
For a Fairer World (PUM+J)	1,577	0.05	New	0	±0
Communist Party of the Catalan People (PCPC)	1,509	0.05	–0.03	0	±0
Left in Positive (IZQP)	1,178	0.04	–0.03	0	±0
Blank ballots	20,457	0.70	+0.16		
Total	2,927,755			32	±0
Valid votes	2,927,755	99.50	–0.04		
Invalid votes	14,599	0.50	+0.04		
Votes cast / turnout	2,942,354	70.04	–4.98		
Abstentions	1,258,797	29.96	+4.98		
Registered voters	4,201,151				

=== April 2019 ===
Summary of the 28 April 2019 Congress of Deputies election results in Barcelona
Parties and alliances	Popular vote			Seats	
Parties and alliances	Votes	%	±pp	Total	+/−
Socialists' Party of Catalonia (PSC–PSOE)	769,548	24.66	+7.84	9	+4
Republican Left of Catalonia–Sovereigntists (ERC–Sobiranistes)	716,714	22.97	+6.40	8	+3
In Common We Can–Let's Win the Change (ECP–Guanyem el Canvi)	509,016	16.31	–9.95	6	–3
Citizens–Party of the Citizenry (Cs)	373,820	11.98	+0.44	4	±0
Together for Catalonia–Together (JxCat–Junts)^{1}	316,904	10.16	–2.09	3	–1
People's Party (PP)	155,935	5.00	–8.53	1	–3
Vox (Vox)	112,019	3.59	New	1	+1
Free People–We Are Alternative–Pirates: Republican Front (Front Republicà)	84,945	2.72	New	0	±0
Animalist Party Against Mistreatment of Animals (PACMA)	50,505	1.62	–0.18	0	±0
Zero Cuts–Green Group (Recortes Cero–GV)	5,845	0.19	–0.11	0	±0
Communist Party of the Catalan People (PCPC)	2,555	0.08	–0.04	0	±0
Left in Positive (IZQP)	2,213	0.07	New	0	±0
Communist Party of the Workers of Catalonia (PCTC)	1,882	0.06	New	0	±0
Convergents (CNV)	1,793	0.06	New	0	±0
Blank ballots	16,747	0.54	–0.26		
Total	3,120,441			32	+1
Valid votes	3,120,441	99.54	+0.14		
Invalid votes	14,440	0.46	–0.14		
Votes cast / turnout	3,134,881	75.02	+10.64		
Abstentions	1,044,046	24.98	–10.64		
Registered voters	4,178,927				
Sources
Footnotes: ^{1} Together for Catalonia–Together results are compared to Democratic Convergence of Catalonia totals in the 2016 election.

=== 2016 ===
Summary of the 26 June 2016 Congress of Deputies election results in Barcelona
Parties and alliances	Popular vote			Seats	
Parties and alliances	Votes	%	±pp	Total	+/−
In Common We Can–Let's Win the Change (ECP)	694,315	26.26	–0.62	9	±0
Socialists' Party of Catalonia (PSC–PSOE)	444,812	16.82	+0.57	5	±0
Republican Left–Catalonia Yes (ERC–CatSí)	438,126	16.57	+2.08	5	±0
People's Party (PP)	357,759	13.53	+2.27	4	±0
Democratic Convergence of Catalonia (CDC)^{1}	323,824	12.25	–1.00	4	±0
Citizens–Party of the Citizenry (C's)	305,075	11.54	–2.00	4	±0
Animalist Party Against Mistreatment of Animals (PACMA)	47,660	1.80	+0.60	0	±0
Zero Cuts–Green Group (Recortes Cero–GV)	8,006	0.30	–0.08	0	±0
Communist Party of the Catalan People (PCPC)	3,275	0.12	–0.07	0	±0
Blank ballots	21,081	0.80	+0.17		
Total	2,643,933			31	±0
Valid votes	2,643,933	99.40	–0.08		
Invalid votes	15,885	0.60	+0.08		
Votes cast / turnout	2,659,818	64.38	–5.22		
Abstentions	1,471,501	35.62	+5.22		
Registered voters	4,131,319				
Sources
Footnotes: ^{1} Democratic Convergence of Catalonia results are compared to Democracy and Freedom totals in the 2015 election.

=== 2015 ===
Summary of the 20 December 2015 Congress of Deputies election results in Barcelona
Parties and alliances	Popular vote			Seats	
Parties and alliances	Votes	%	±pp	Total	+/−
In Common We Can (En Comú)^{1}	768,235	26.88	+17.81	9	+6
Socialists' Party of Catalonia (PSC–PSOE)	464,588	16.25	–11.55	5	–5
Republican Left of Catalonia–Catalonia Yes (ERC–CatSí)	414,163	14.49	+8.01	5	+3
Citizens–Party of the Citizenry (C's)	387,061	13.54	New	4	+4
Democracy and Freedom (DiL)^{2}	378,723	13.25	–13.90	4	–5
People's Party (PP)	321,980	11.26	–9.67	4	–3
Democratic Union of Catalonia (unio.cat)	48,326	1.69	New	0	±0
Animalist Party Against Mistreatment of Animals (PACMA)	34,394	1.20	+0.49	0	±0
Zero Cuts–Green Group (Recortes Cero–GV)	10,730	0.38	New	0	±0
Union, Progress and Democracy (UPyD)	6,595	0.23	–1.04	0	±0
Communist Party of the Catalan People (PCPC)	5,493	0.19	New	0	±0
Blank ballots	18,119	0.63	–1.16		
Total	2,858,407			31	±0
Valid votes	2,858,407	99.48	+0.97		
Invalid votes	14,976	0.52	–0.97		
Votes cast / turnout	2,873,383	69.60	+3.69		
Abstentions	1,254,798	30.40	–3.69		
Registered voters	4,128,181				
Sources
Footnotes: ^{1} In Common We Can results are compared to Initiative for Catalonia Greens–United and Alternative Left: Plural L. totals in the 2011 election.; ^{2} Democracy and Freedom results are compared to Convergence and Union totals in the 2011 election.

=== 2011 ===
Summary of the 20 November 2011 Congress of Deputies election results in Barcelona
Parties and alliances	Popular vote			Seats	
Parties and alliances	Votes	%	±pp	Total	+/−
Socialists' Party of Catalonia (PSC–PSOE)	727,220	27.80	–18.97	10	–6
Convergence and Union (CiU)	710,178	27.15	+7.57	9	+3
People's Party (PP)	547,376	20.93	+4.12	7	+1
Initiative for Catalonia Greens–United and Alternative Left: Plural L. (ICV–EUiA)	237,327	9.07	+3.51	3	+2
Republican Left of Catalonia–Rally–Catalonia Yes (ERC–RI.cat)	169,601	6.48	–0.11	2	±0
Platform for Catalonia (PxC)	53,142	2.03	New	0	±0
Blank Seats (EB)	40,054	1.53	+1.40	0	±0
Union, Progress and Democracy (UPyD)	33,111	1.27	+1.08	0	±0
Animalist Party Against Mistreatment of Animals (PACMA)	18,638	0.71	+0.42	0	±0
Pirates of Catalonia (Pirata.cat)	17,393	0.67	New	0	±0
Anti-capitalists (Anticapitalistas)	11,346	0.43	New	0	±0
Communist Unification of Spain (UCE)	3,341	0.13	New	0	±0
Blank ballots	46,738	1.79	+0.27		
Total	2,615,465			31	±0
Valid votes	2,615,465	98.51	–1.03		
Invalid votes	39,462	1.49	+1.03		
Votes cast / turnout	2,654,927	65.91	–4.74		
Abstentions	1,373,190	34.09	+4.74		
Registered voters	4,028,117				

=== 2008 ===
Summary of the 9 March 2008 Congress of Deputies election results in Barcelona
Parties and alliances	Popular vote			Seats	
Parties and alliances	Votes	%	±pp	Total	+/−
Socialists' Party of Catalonia (PSC–PSOE)	1,309,171	46.77	+5.11	16	+2
Convergence and Union (CiU)	547,993	19.58	+0.30	6	±0
People's Party (PP)	470,677	16.81	+0.86	6	+1
Republican Left of Catalonia (esquerra)	184,558	6.59	–7.50	2	–2
Initiative for Catalonia Greens–United and Alternative Left (ICV–EUiA)	155,674	5.56	–0.95	1	–1
Citizens–Party of the Citizenry (C's)	24,220	0.87	New	0	±0
The Greens–The Ecologist Alternative (EV–AE)	12,561	0.45	–0.43	0	±0
Anti-Bullfighting Party Against Mistreatment of Animals (PACMA)	8,153	0.29	New	0	±0
The Greens (EV–LV)	7,324	0.26	New	0	±0
Union, Progress and Democracy (UPyD)	5,179	0.19	New	0	±0
Catalan Republican Party (RC)	4,250	0.15	New	0	±0
Unsubmissive Seats–Alternative of Discontented Democrats (Ei–ADD)	3,733	0.13	+0.07	0	±0
Communist Party of the Catalan People (PCPC)	3,100	0.11	+0.06	0	±0
Pensioners in Action Party (PDLPEA)	3,050	0.11	New	0	±0
Citizens for Blank Votes (CenB)	2,851	0.10	+0.01	0	±0
For a Fairer World (PUM+J)	1,525	0.05	New	0	±0
Internationalist Socialist Workers' Party (POSI)	1,486	0.05	New	0	±0
Republican Left–Left Republican Party (IR–PRE)	1,387	0.05	–0.01	0	±0
National Democracy (DN)	1,326	0.05	+0.02	0	±0
Family and Life Party (PFiV)	1,279	0.05	±0.00	0	±0
Spanish Phalanx of the CNSO (FE de las JONS)	1,102	0.04	±0.00	0	±0
Engine and Sports Alternative (AMD)	1,079	0.04	New	0	±0
Party for Catalonia (PxCat)	823	0.03	New	0	±0
Humanist Party (PH)	627	0.02	–0.02	0	±0
Civil Liberties Party (PLCI)	594	0.02	New	0	±0
Spain 2000 (E–2000)	527	0.02	New	0	±0
Authentic Phalanx (FA)	524	0.02	New	0	±0
Spanish Alternative (AES)	509	0.02	New	0	±0
National Alliance (AN)	359	0.01	New	0	±0
Internationalist Struggle (LI (LIT–CI))	321	0.01	±0.00	0	±0
Carlist Party of Catalonia (PCdeC)	301	0.01	New	0	±0
Internationalist Solidarity and Self-Management (SAIn)	293	0.01	New	0	±0
Blank ballots	42,672	1.52	+0.60		
Total	2,799,228			31	±0
Valid votes	2,799,228	99.54	–0.18		
Invalid votes	12,834	0.46	+0.18		
Votes cast / turnout	2,812,062	70.65	–5.52		
Abstentions	1,168,119	29.35	+5.52		
Registered voters	3,980,181				

=== 2004 ===
Summary of the 14 March 2004 Congress of Deputies election results in Barcelona
Parties and alliances	Popular vote			Seats	
Parties and alliances	Votes	%	±pp	Total	+/−
Socialists' Party of Catalonia (PSC–PSOE)	1,268,028	41.66	+6.15	14	+2
Convergence and Union (CiU)	586,854	19.28	–7.02	6	–3
People's Party (PP)	485,504	15.95	–7.58	5	–3
Republican Left of Catalonia (ERC)	428,986	14.09	+8.97	4	+3
Initiative for Catalonia Greens–United and Alternative Left (ICV–EUiA)^{1}	198,116	6.51	–0.04	2	+1
The Greens–The Ecologist Alternative (EV–AE)	26,739	0.88	New	0	±0
Internationalist Socialist Workers' Party (POSI)	2,691	0.09	–0.05	0	±0
Citizens for Blank Votes (CenB)	2,686	0.09	New	0	±0
Democratic and Social Centre (CDS)	2,113	0.07	+0.01	0	±0
Republican Left–Left Republican Party (IR–PRE)	1,889	0.06	+0.01	0	±0
Unsubmissive Seats–Alternative of Discontented Democrats (Ei–ADD)	1,812	0.06	New	0	±0
Family and Life Party (PFiV)	1,586	0.05	New	0	±0
Communist Party of the Catalan People (PCPC)	1,534	0.05	New	0	±0
Spanish Phalanx of the CNSO (FE de las JONS)^{2}	1,359	0.04	+0.01	0	±0
Humanist Party (PH)	1,141	0.04	–0.01	0	±0
National Democracy (DN)	1,029	0.03	New	0	±0
The Phalanx (FE)	999	0.03	±0.00	0	±0
Spanish Democratic Party (PADE)	591	0.02	±0.00	0	±0
Caló Nationalist Party (PNCA)	566	0.02	–0.01	0	±0
Republican Social Movement (MSR)	522	0.02	New	0	±0
European Nation State (N)	410	0.01	–0.02	0	±0
Spanish Democratic Front (FDE)	377	0.01	New	0	±0
Internationalist Struggle (LI (LIT–CI))	324	0.01	–0.01	0	±0
Blank ballots	27,979	0.92	–0.50		
Total	3,043,835			31	±0
Valid votes	3,043,835	99.72	+0.14		
Invalid votes	8,475	0.28	–0.14		
Votes cast / turnout	3,052,310	76.17	+12.39		
Abstentions	955,020	23.83	–12.39		
Registered voters	4,007,330				
Sources
Footnotes: ^{1} Initiative for Catalonia Greens–United and Alternative Left results are compared to the combined totals of Initiative for Catalonia–Greens and United and Alternative Left in the 2000 election.; ^{2} Spanish Phalanx of the CNSO results are compared to Independent Spanish Phalanx–Phalanx 2000 totals in the 2000 election.

=== 2000 ===
Summary of the 12 March 2000 Congress of Deputies election results in Barcelona
Parties and alliances	Popular vote			Seats	
Parties and alliances	Votes	%	±pp	Total	+/−
Socialists' Party of Catalonia (PSC–PSOE)	909,601	35.51	–4.81	12	–1
Convergence and Union (CiU)	673,558	26.30	–1.13	9	±0
People's Party (PP)	602,777	23.53	+5.16	8	+2
Republican Left of Catalonia (ERC)	131,114	5.12	+1.29	1	±0
Initiative for Catalonia–Greens (IC–V)	103,778	4.05	–4.69	1	–1
United and Alternative Left (EUiA)	64,111	2.50	New	0	±0
The Greens–Green Group (EV–GV)	14,922	0.58	New	0	±0
The Greens–Green Alternative (EV–AV)	7,685	0.30	New	0	±0
Internationalist Socialist Workers' Party (POSI)	3,501	0.14	New	0	±0
Liberal Independent Group (GIL)	2,547	0.10	New	0	±0
Catalan State (EC)	1,538	0.06	New	0	±0
Centrist Union–Democratic and Social Centre (UC–CDS)	1,450	0.06	–0.01	0	±0
Humanist Party (PH)	1,333	0.05	+0.01	0	±0
Republican Left–Left Republican Party (IR–PRE)	1,275	0.05	New	0	±0
Natural Law Party (PLN)	1,048	0.04	New	0	±0
Caló Nationalist Party (PNCA)	861	0.03	New	0	±0
Independent Spanish Phalanx–Phalanx 2000 (FEI–FE 2000)	826	0.03	New	0	±0
The Phalanx (FE)	826	0.03	New	0	±0
European Nation State (N)	710	0.03	+0.01	0	±0
Spain 2000 Platform (ES2000)	613	0.02	New	0	±0
Internationalist Struggle (LI (LIT–CI))	518	0.02	New	0	±0
Spanish Democratic Party (PADE)	430	0.02	New	0	±0
Blank ballots	36,486	1.42	+0.74		
Total	2,561,508			31	±0
Valid votes	2,561,508	99.58	–0.13		
Invalid votes	10,920	0.42	+0.13		
Votes cast / turnout	2,572,428	63.78	–12.87		
Abstentions	1,460,589	36.22	+12.87		
Registered voters	4,033,017				

=== 1996 ===
Summary of the 3 March 1996 Congress of Deputies election results in Barcelona
Parties and alliances	Popular vote			Seats	
Parties and alliances	Votes	%	±pp	Total	+/−
Socialists' Party of Catalonia (PSC–PSOE)	1,203,339	40.32	+3.95	13	+1
Convergence and Union (CiU)	818,832	27.43	–2.62	9	–1
People's Party (PP)	548,323	18.37	+1.42	6	±0
Initiative for Catalonia–The Greens (IC–EV)	260,881	8.74	+0.27	2	–1
Republican Left of Catalonia (ERC)	114,195	3.83	–0.50	1	±0
The European Greens–Ecologist Alternative of Catalonia (EVE–AEC)^{1}	6,241	0.21	–0.86	0	±0
Ecologist Party of Catalonia (PEC)	3,980	0.13	–0.16	0	±0
Centrist Union (UC)	2,221	0.07	–0.72	0	±0
Workers' Revolutionary Party (PRT)^{2}	1,936	0.06	–0.18	0	±0
Authentic Spanish Phalanx (FEA)	1,296	0.04	+0.01	0	±0
Humanist Party (PH)	1,060	0.04	±0.00	0	±0
Citizen Independent Platform of Catalonia (PICC)	895	0.03	New	0	±0
Republican Coalition (CR)^{3}	655	0.02	–0.01	0	±0
European Nation State (N)	495	0.02	New	0	±0
Revolutionary Workers' Party (POR)	0	0.00	–0.09	0	±0
Blank ballots	20,365	0.68	+0.04		
Total	2,984,714			31	–1
Valid votes	2,984,714	99.71	+0.07		
Invalid votes	8,710	0.29	–0.07		
Votes cast / turnout	2,993,424	76.65	+0.90		
Abstentions	911,831	23.35	–0.90		
Registered voters	3,905,255				
Sources
Footnotes: ^{1} The European Greens–Ecologist Alternative of Catalonia results are compared to The Greens–Ecologist Confederation of Catalonia totals in the 1993 election.; ^{2} Workers' Revolutionary Party results are compared to Workers' Socialist Party totals in the 1993 election.; ^{3} Republican Coalition results are compared to Coalition for a New Socialist Party totals in the 1993 election.

=== 1993 ===
Summary of the 6 June 1993 Congress of Deputies election results in Barcelona
Parties and alliances	Popular vote			Seats	
Parties and alliances	Votes	%	±pp	Total	+/−
Socialists' Party of Catalonia (PSC–PSOE)	1,030,053	36.37	–0.61	12	–2
Convergence and Union (CiU)	851,105	30.05	–0.30	10	–1
People's Party (PP)	480,204	16.95	+6.43	6	+3
Initiative for Catalonia (IC)	240,019	8.47	+0.28	3	±0
Republican Left of Catalonia (ERC)	122,530	4.33	+1.85	1	+1
The Greens–Ecologist Confederation of Catalonia (EV–CEC)^{1}	30,188	1.07	–0.43	0	±0
Democratic and Social Centre (CDS)	22,446	0.79	–3.74	0	–1
The Ecologists (LE)	9,495	0.34	–0.46	0	±0
Ecologist Party of Catalonia–VERDE (PEC–VERDE)	8,179	0.29	–0.04	0	±0
Workers' Socialist Party (PST)	6,813	0.24	–0.14	0	±0
Ruiz-Mateos Group–European Democratic Alliance (ARM–ADE)	4,958	0.18	–1.01	0	±0
Revolutionary Workers' Party (POR)	2,557	0.09	±0.00	0	±0
Humanist Party (PH)	1,181	0.04	–0.05	0	±0
Spanish Phalanx of the CNSO (FE–JONS)	1,132	0.04	–0.05	0	±0
Natural Law Party (PLN)	1,118	0.04	New	0	±0
Authentic Spanish Phalanx (FEA)	747	0.03	New	0	±0
Coalition for a New Socialist Party (CNPS)^{2}	712	0.03	–0.02	0	±0
Union of Autonomies (UDLA)	594	0.02	New	0	±0
Communist Unification of Spain (UCE)	0	0.00	New	0	±0
Blank ballots	18,229	0.64	+0.06		
Total	2,832,260			32	±0
Valid votes	2,832,260	99.64	+0.18		
Invalid votes	10,291	0.36	–0.18		
Votes cast / turnout	2,842,551	75.75	+7.84		
Abstentions	909,910	24.25	–7.84		
Registered voters	3,752,461				
Sources
Footnotes: ^{1} The Greens–Ecologist Confederation of Catalonia results are compared to the combined totals of Green Alternative–Ecologist Movement of Catalonia and The Greens–Green List in the 1989 election.; ^{2} Coalition for a New Socialist Party results are compared to Alliance for the Republic totals in the 1989 election.

=== 1989 ===
Summary of the 29 October 1989 Congress of Deputies election results in Barcelona
Parties and alliances	Popular vote			Seats	
Parties and alliances	Votes	%	±pp	Total	+/−
Socialists' Party of Catalonia (PSC–PSOE)	903,546	36.98	–6.23	14	–2
Convergence and Union (CiU)	741,682	30.35	+0.50	11	±0
People's Party (PP)^{1}	257,021	10.52	–0.18	3	–1
Initiative for Catalonia (IC)^{2}	200,050	8.19	+4.02	3	+2
Democratic and Social Centre (CDS)	110,681	4.53	+0.17	1	±0
Republican Left of Catalonia (ERC)	60,642	2.48	–0.08	0	±0
Ruiz-Mateos Group (Ruiz-Mateos)	29,187	1.19	New	0	±0
Party of the Communists of Catalonia (PCC)	27,746	1.14	–0.69	0	±0
The Ecologist Greens (EVE)	19,573	0.80	New	0	±0
Green Alternative–Ecologist Movement of Catalonia (AV–MEC)^{3}	18,518	0.76	+0.15	0	±0
The Greens–Green List (EV–LV)	18,089	0.74	New	0	±0
Workers' Party of Spain–Communist Unity (PTE–UC)^{4}	10,782	0.44	–0.19	0	±0
Workers' Socialist Party (PST)	9,270	0.38	+0.05	0	±0
Ecologist Party of Catalonia–VERDE (PEC–VERDE)	8,110	0.33	–0.15	0	±0
Social Democratic Coalition (CSD)^{5}	4,996	0.20	+0.07	0	±0
Revolutionary Workers' Party of Spain (PORE)	2,276	0.09	+0.02	0	±0
Humanist Party of Catalonia (PHC)	2,223	0.09	New	0	±0
Spanish Phalanx of the CNSO (FE–JONS)	2,087	0.09	–0.03	0	±0
Centrist Unity–Democratic Spanish Party (PED)	1,200	0.05	±0.00	0	±0
Alliance for the Republic (AxR)^{6}	1,127	0.05	–0.05	0	±0
Valencian Nationalist Left–Valencian Regional Union (ENV–URV)	596	0.02	New	0	±0
Communist Party of Spain (Marxist–Leninist) (PCE (m–l))^{7}	0	0.00	–0.11	0	±0
Blank ballots	14,241	0.58	+0.17		
Total	2,443,643			32	–1
Valid votes	2,443,643	99.46	+0.27		
Invalid votes	13,323	0.54	–0.27		
Votes cast / turnout	2,456,966	67.91	–0.87		
Abstentions	1,160,982	32.09	+0.87		
Registered voters	3,617,948				
Sources
Footnotes: ^{1} People's Party results are compared to People's Coalition totals in the 1986 election.; ^{2} Initiative for Catalonia results are compared to Union of the Catalan Left totals in the 1986 election.; ^{3} Green Alternative–Ecologist Movement of Catalonia results are compared to Green Alternative List totals in the 1986 election.; ^{4} Workers' Party of Spain–Communist Unity results are compared to Communists' Unity Board totals in the 1986 election.; ^{5} Social Democratic Coalition results are compared to Social Democratic Party of Catalonia totals in the 1986 election.; ^{6} Alliance for the Republic results are compared to Internationalist Socialist Workers' Party totals in the 1986 election.; ^{7} Communist Party of Spain (Marxist–Leninist) results are compared to Republican Popular Unity totals in the 1986 election.

=== 1986 ===
Summary of the 22 June 1986 Congress of Deputies election results in Barcelona
Parties and alliances	Popular vote			Seats	
Parties and alliances	Votes	%	±pp	Total	+/−
Socialists' Party of Catalonia (PSC–PSOE)	1,054,135	43.21	–4.98	16	–2
Convergence and Union (CiU)	728,372	29.85	+8.95	11	+3
People's Coalition (AP–PDP–PL)^{1}	261,166	10.70	–3.69	4	–1
Democratic and Social Centre (CDS)	106,434	4.36	+2.50	1	+1
Union of the Catalan Left (PSUC–ENE)^{2}	101,654	4.17	–1.64	1	±0
Republican Left of Catalonia (ERC)	62,390	2.56	–1.16	0	–1
Party of the Communists of Catalonia (PCC)	44,757	1.83	+0.29	0	±0
Communists' Unity Board (MUC)	15,390	0.63	New	0	±0
Green Alternative List (LAV)	14,788	0.61	New	0	±0
Ecologist Party of Catalonia–VERDE (PEC–VERDE)	11,746	0.48	New	0	±0
Workers' Socialist Party (PST)	7,964	0.33	–0.25	0	±0
Communist Unification of Spain (UCE)	4,411	0.18	+0.12	0	±0
Social Democratic Party of Catalonia (PSDC)	3,137	0.13	New	0	±0
Spanish Phalanx of the CNSO (FE–JONS)	2,999	0.12	+0.12	0	±0
Republican Popular Unity (UPR)^{3}	2,658	0.11	+0.04	0	±0
Internationalist Socialist Workers' Party (POSI)	2,386	0.10	New	0	±0
Communist Workers' League (LOC)	1,952	0.08	+0.08	0	±0
Revolutionary Workers' Party of Spain (PORE)	1,626	0.07	New	0	±0
Democratic Spanish Party (PED)	1,169	0.05	New	0	±0
Proverist Party (PPr)	756	0.03	New	0	±0
Blank ballots	9,905	0.41	+0.01		
Total	2,439,795			33	±0
Valid votes	2,439,795	99.19	+0.44		
Invalid votes	19,897	0.81	–0.44		
Votes cast / turnout	2,459,692	68.78	–12.75		
Abstentions	1,116,712	31.22	+12.75		
Registered voters	3,576,404				
Sources
Footnotes: ^{1} People's Coalition results are compared to People's Alliance–People's Democratic Party totals in the 1982 election.; ^{2} Union of the Catalan Left results are compared to the combined totals of Unified Socialist Party of Catalonia and Left Nationalists in the 1982 election.; ^{3} Republican Popular Unity results are compared to Communist Party of Spain (Marxist–Leninist) totals in the 1982 election.

=== 1982 ===
Summary of the 28 October 1982 Congress of Deputies election results in Barcelona
Parties and alliances	Popular vote			Seats	
Parties and alliances	Votes	%	±pp	Total	+/−
Socialists' Party of Catalonia (PSC–PSOE)	1,292,672	48.19	+17.91	18	+6
Convergence and Union (CiU)	560,555	20.90	+5.10	8	+2
People's Alliance–People's Democratic Party (AP–PDP)^{1}	385,967	14.39	+10.72	5	+4
Unified Socialist Party of Catalonia (PSUC–PCE)	131,314	4.90	–14.14	1	–6
Republican Left of Catalonia (ERC)	99,852	3.72	–0.15	1	±0
Democratic and Social Centre (CDS)	49,772	1.86	New	0	±0
Party of the Communists of Catalonia (PCC)	41,371	1.54	New	0	±0
Centrists of Catalonia (CC–UCD)	40,222	1.50	–15.39	0	–6
Left Nationalists (NE)	24,382	0.91	New	0	±0
Workers' Socialist Party (PST)	15,462	0.58	New	0	±0
New Force (FN)^{2}	8,724	0.33	–0.57	0	±0
Socialist Party of Andalusia–Andalusian Party (PSA–PA)	6,687	0.25	New	0	±0
Communist Front of Catalonia (FCC)^{3}	3,937	0.15	–0.10	0	±0
Communist Workers' Party of Catalonia (PCOC)	2,699	0.10	New	0	±0
Spanish Solidarity (SE)	2,391	0.09	New	0	±0
Communist Party of Spain (Marxist–Leninist) (PCE (m–l))	2,011	0.07	New	0	±0
Conservatives of Catalonia (CiC)	1,889	0.07	New	0	±0
Communist Unification of Spain (UCE)	1,689	0.06	–0.22	0	±0
Communist League–Internationalist Socialist Workers' Coalition (LC (COSI))	0	0.00	±0.00	0	±0
Spanish Phalanx of the CNSO (FE–JONS)	0	0.00	New	0	±0
Socialist Party (PS)^{4}	0	0.00	–1.30	0	±0
Blank ballots	10,818	0.40	–0.02		
Total	2,682,414			33	±0
Valid votes	2,682,414	98.75	+0.58		
Invalid votes	33,875	1.25	–0.58		
Votes cast / turnout	2,716,289	81.53	+14.11		
Abstentions	615,322	18.47	–14.11		
Registered voters	3,331,611				
Sources
Footnotes: ^{1} People's Alliance–People's Democratic Party results are compared to Democratic Coalition totals in the 1979 election.; ^{2} New Force results are compared to National Union totals in the 1979 election.; ^{3} Communist Front of Catalonia results are compared to Revolutionary Communist League totals in the 1979 election.; ^{4} Socialist Party results are compared to Spanish Socialist Workers' Party (historical) totals in the 1979 election.

=== 1979 ===
Summary of the 1 March 1979 Congress of Deputies election results in Barcelona
Parties and alliances	Popular vote			Seats	
Parties and alliances	Votes	%	±pp	Total	+/−
Socialists' Party of Catalonia (PSC–PSOE)^{1}	694,847	30.28	–2.02	12	+1
Unified Socialist Party of Catalonia (PSUC–PCE)	436,908	19.04	–0.82	7	±0
Centrists of Catalonia (CC–UCD)^{2}	387,543	16.89	+1.83	6	+1
Convergence and Union (CiU)^{3}	362,427	15.80	–5.04	6	–2
Republican Left of Catalonia–National Front of Catalonia (ERC–FNC)^{4}	88,770	3.87	–0.90	1	±0
Democratic Coalition (CD)^{5}	84,195	3.67	+0.49	1	±0
Left Bloc for National Liberation (BEAN)	41,430	1.81	New	0	±0
Party of Labour of Catalonia (PTC–PTE)	36,001	1.57	New	0	±0
Spanish Socialist Workers' Party (historical) (PSOEh)^{6}	29,868	1.30	+0.93	0	±0
National Union (UN)^{7}	20,743	0.90	+0.52	0	±0
Republican Left (IR)	15,019	0.65	New	0	±0
Workers' Revolutionary Organization (ORT)^{8}	11,122	0.48	+0.06	0	±0
Communist Movement–Organization of Communist Left (MC–OIC)^{9}	10,714	0.47	–0.04	0	±0
Workers' Communist Party (PCT)	10,022	0.44	New	0	±0
Communist Organization of Spain (Red Flag) (OCE–BR)	8,120	0.35	New	0	±0
Communist Unification of Spain (UCE)	6,515	0.28	New	0	±0
Syndicalist Party (PSIN)	5,932	0.26	New	0	±0
Revolutionary Communist League (LCR)^{10}	5,775	0.25	–0.32	0	±0
Catalan State (EC)	5,767	0.25	New	0	±0
Social Christian Democracy of Catalonia (DSCC)	4,976	0.22	–0.17	0	±0
Spanish Phalanx of the CNSO (Authentic) (FE–JONS(A))	3,908	0.17	–0.10	0	±0
Liberal Party of Catalonia (PLC)	3,267	0.14	New	0	±0
Carlist Party (PC)	2,554	0.11	New	0	±0
Basque Country Left (EE)	2,550	0.11	New	0	±0
Pro-Austerity Policy Political Party (PIPPA)	2,409	0.10	New	0	±0
Union for the Freedom of Speech (ULE)	1,838	0.08	New	0	±0
Proverist Party (PPr)	1,622	0.07	–0.10	0	±0
Communist League (LC)	0	0.00	New	0	±0
Spanish Phalanx–Falangist Unity (FE–UF)	0	0.00	New	0	±0
Blank ballots	9,714	0.42	+0.24		
Total	2,294,556			33	±0
Valid votes	2,294,556	98.17	–0.59		
Invalid votes	42,753	1.83	+0.59		
Votes cast / turnout	2,337,309	67.42	–12.21		
Abstentions	1,129,224	32.58	+12.21		
Registered voters	3,466,533				
Sources
Footnotes: ^{1} Socialists' Party of Catalonia results are compared to the combined totals of Socialists of Catalonia and People's Socialist Party–Socialist Unity in the 1977 election.; ^{2} Centrists of Catalonia results are compared to Union of the Democratic Centre totals in the 1977 election.; ^{3} Convergence and Union results are compared to the combined totals of Democratic Pact for Catalonia and Union of the Centre and Christian Democracy of Catalonia in the 1977 election.; ^{4} Republican Left of Catalonia–National Front of Catalonia results are compared to Left of Catalonia–Democratic Electoral Front totals in the 1977 election.; ^{5} Democratic Coalition results are compared to Catalan Coexistence–People's Alliance totals in the 1977 election.; ^{6} Spanish Socialist Workers' Party (historical) results are compared to Democratic Socialist Alliance totals in the 1977 election.; ^{7} National Union results are compared to National Alliance July 18 totals in the 1977 election.; ^{8} Workers' Revolutionary Organization results are compared to Workers' Electoral Group totals in the 1977 election.; ^{9} Communist Movement–Organization of Communist Left results are compared to Popular Unity for Socialism Candidacy totals in the 1977 election.; ^{10} Revolutionary Communist League results are compared to Front for Workers' Unity totals in the 1977 election.

=== 1977 ===
Summary of the 15 June 1977 Congress of Deputies election results in Barcelona
Parties and alliances	Popular vote			Seats	
Parties and alliances	Votes	%	±pp	Total	+/−
Socialists of Catalonia (PSC–PSOE)	721,880	30.55	n/a	11	n/a
Unified Socialist Party of Catalonia (PSUC–PCE)	469,361	19.86	n/a	7	n/a
Democratic Pact for Catalonia (PDC)	364,798	15.44	n/a	6	n/a
Union of the Democratic Centre (UCD)	355,857	15.06	n/a	5	n/a
Union of the Centre and Christian Democracy of Catalonia (UCiDCC)	127,679	5.40	n/a	2	n/a
Left of Catalonia–Democratic Electoral Front (EC–FED)	112,794	4.77	n/a	1	n/a
Catalan Coexistence–People's Alliance (CC–AP)	75,097	3.18	n/a	1	n/a
People's Socialist Party–Socialist Unity (PSP–US)	41,356	1.75	n/a	0	n/a
Front for Workers' Unity (FUT)	13,559	0.57	n/a	0	n/a
Popular Unity for Socialism Candidacy (CUPS)	12,040	0.51	n/a	0	n/a
Workers' Electoral Group (AET)	10,017	0.42	n/a	0	n/a
League of Catalonia–Catalan Liberal Party (LC–PLC)	9,203	0.39	n/a	0	n/a
Social Christian Democracy of Catalonia (DSCC)	9,157	0.39	n/a	0	n/a
National Alliance July 18 (AN18)	8,895	0.38	n/a	0	n/a
Democratic Socialist Alliance (ASDCI)	8,738	0.37	n/a	0	n/a
Catalan Social Reform (RSC)	7,900	0.33	n/a	0	n/a
Spanish Phalanx of the CNSO (Authentic) (FE–JONS(A))	6,395	0.27	n/a	0	n/a
Proverist Party (PPr)	4,112	0.17	n/a	0	n/a
Blank ballots	4,279	0.18	n/a		
Total	2,363,117			33	n/a
Valid votes	2,363,117	98.76	n/a		
Invalid votes	29,657	1.24	n/a		
Votes cast / turnout	2,392,774	79.63	n/a		
Abstentions	612,214	20.37	n/a		
Registered voters	3,004,988				

== Bibliography ==
- Ley 1/1977, de 4 de enero, para la Reforma Política (Fundamental Law 1/1977). Official State Gazette (in Spanish). 4 January 1977. BOE-A-1977-165.
- Real Decreto-ley 20/1977, de 18 de marzo, sobre Normas Electorales (Royal Decree-Law 20/1977). Official State Gazette (in Spanish). 18 March 1977. BOE-A-1977-7445.
- Constitución Española (Constitution). Official State Gazette (in Spanish). 27 December 1978. BOE-A-1978-31229.
- Ley Orgánica 5/1985, de 19 de junio, del Régimen Electoral General (Organic Law 5/1985). Official State Gazette (in Spanish). 19 June 1985. BOE-A-1985-11672.
- Carreras de Odriozola, Albert; Tafunell Sambola, Xavier (2005) [1989]. Estadísticas históricas de España, siglos XIX-XX (PDF) (in Spanish). Vol. 1 (II ed.). Bilbao: Fundación BBVA. pp. 1072–1097. ISBN 84-96515-00-1. Archived from the original (PDF) on 24 September 2015.
