= Socialist Convergence of Catalonia =

Socialist Convergence of Catalonia Convergència Socialista de Catalunya
- Secretary-General: Joan Reventós
- Founded: 1974
- Dissolved: 1 November 1976
- Split from: Socialist Movement of Catalonia
- Merged into: Socialist Party of Catalonia-Congress
- Ideology: Democratic socialism Catalan nationalism Antifascism; Marxism
- Political position: Left-wing

Socialist Convergence of Catalonia (in Catalan: Convèrgencia Socialista de Catalunya, CSC) was a political party in Catalonia, Spain. CSC was founded in 1974 as from a split of the Socialist Movement of Catalonia (MSC).

Its secretary general was Joan Reventós. The party participated in the unitary organizations of the antifascist opposition in Catalonia, expecting to join forces with other social-democratic and socialist parties.

In 1976 CSC merged with other groups and parties to form the Socialist Party of Catalonia-Congress.

== See also ==
- Socialists' Party of Catalonia
- Socialist Party of Catalonia–Congress
- Socialist Party of Catalonia–Regrouping
- Catalan Federation of the PSOE
- Unified Socialist Party of Catalonia
- List of political parties in Catalonia
