= Socialist Movement of Catalonia =

Socialist Movement of Catalonia Moviment Socialista de Catalunya
- Leader: Josep Pallach i Carolà; Joan Reventós
- Founded: 1945
- Dissolved: 1974
- Newspaper: Endavant
- Ideology: Democratic socialism Catalanism; Federalism; Antifascism
- Political position: Left-wing

Socialist Movement of Catalonia (in Catalan: Moviment Socialista de Catalunya, MSC) was a political party in Catalonia, Spain. The MSC was founded in exile the 14 of January 1945 by ex-members of the POUM, PSUC and Republican Left of Catalonia. Due to the Francoist State the party acted underground in Catalonia.

== History ==
In 1968, after the May 1968 movement the party split in two factions, one led Josep Pallach i Carolà, with a social democratic ideology; and another, led by Joan Reventós with a Marxist ideology. The party fully split in 1974, when the social-democrats created the Socialist Party of Catalonia–Regrouping and the Marxists the Socialist Convergence of Catalonia.

== See also ==
- Socialists' Party of Catalonia
- Socialist Party of Catalonia–Regrouping
- Socialist Convergence of Catalonia
- List of political parties in Catalonia
