= Francesc Ricomá de Castellarnau =

Spanish politician (born 1960)

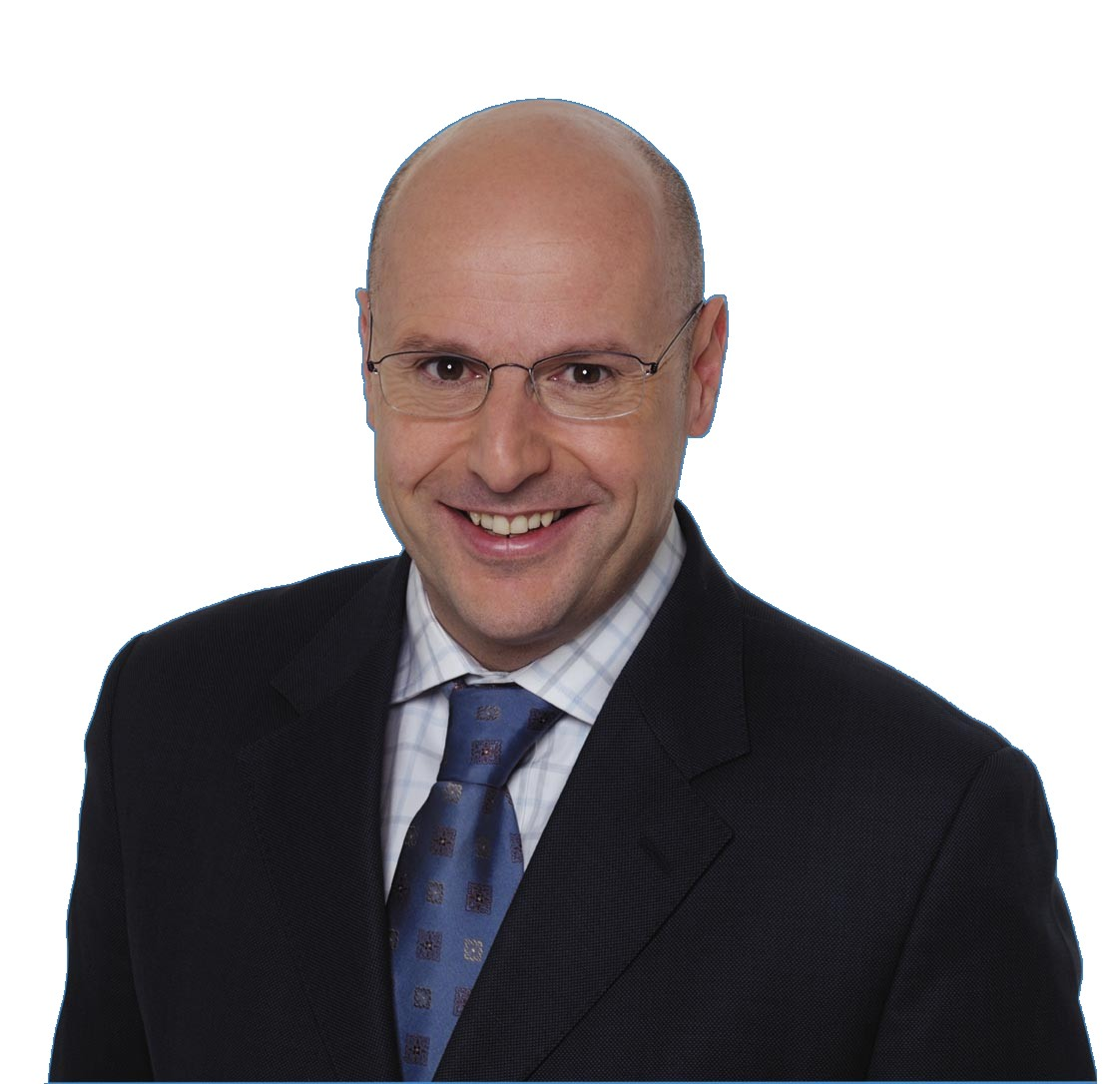
Francesc Ricomà

Francesc Ricomá de Castellarnau (Tarragona, Spain, 27 January 1960) is a Spanish teacher and politician who belongs to the People's Party (PP), the main opposition party since the 2004 General Election.

Married with two daughters, Ricomá gained a diploma in Labour relations and subsequently worked as a technical adviser to the Spanish National Statistics Institute. He was first elected to the Spanish Congress of Deputies at the 1993 General Election representing Tarragona Province and was re-elected in the subsequent elections in 1996, 2000, 2004 and 2008. He served as a local councillor in Tarragona from 1996 to 1999, where he headed the PP group on the council.
