= Raimon Obiols =

Spanish politician

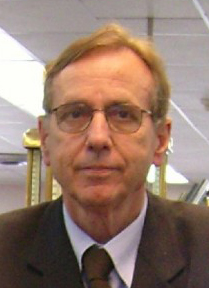
Raimon Obiols

Josep Maria "Raimon" Obiols i Germà (born 5 August 1940, in Barcelona) is a Spanish politician and Member of the European Parliament for the Spanish Socialist Workers' Party (PSOE), part of the Party of European Socialists. He is a high-ranking-member of the PSOE Catalonia wing, the Socialists' Party of Catalonia (PSC). Obiols began his political career in 1977 when he was elected to the Spanish Congress of Deputies representing Barcelona Province serving until 1984, when he resigned after being elected to the Parliament of Catalunya.

Assembly seats
Preceded by Joan Reventós	Leader of the Opposition in the Parliament of Catalonia; 1984 - 1995	Succeeded by Joaquim Nadal
Party political offices
Preceded by Joan Reventós	First Secretary of PSC; 1983 – 1996	Succeeded by Narcís Serra
Preceded by Joan Reventós	President of PSC; 1996 – 2000	Succeeded by Pasqual Maragall
