= Socialists of Catalonia =

Socialists of Catalonia Socialistes de Catalunya
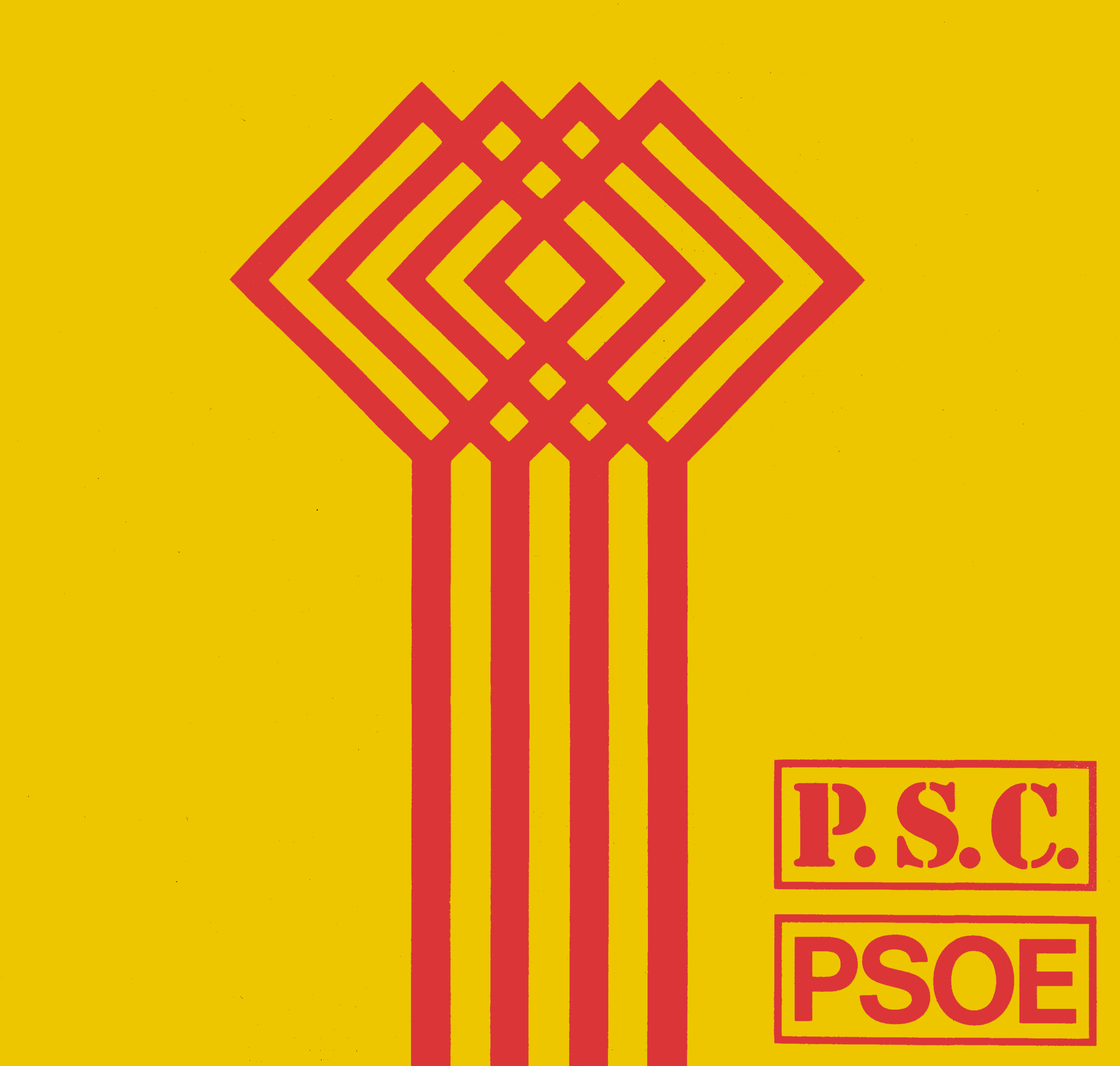
- Founded: 29 March 1977
- Dissolved: 16 July 1978
- Merged into: Socialists' Party of Catalonia
- Ideology: Democratic socialism Catalanism; Social democracy
- Political position: Centre-left
- National affiliation: Spanish Socialist Workers' Party
- Members: See list of members

Socialists of Catalonia (Catalan: Socialistes de Catalunya, PSC–PSOE) was an electoral alliance formed to contest the 1977 Spanish Congress of Deputies election in Catalonia, comprising both the Socialist Party of Catalonia–Congress (PSC–C) and the Catalan Socialist Federation (PSOE). It was dissolved in 1978 when its two components merged with the Socialist Party of Catalonia–Regrouping (PSC–R) into the Socialists' Party of Catalonia (PSC).

For the Senate of Spain, the alliance supported the aligned Agreement of the Catalans coalition, which was participated by both the PSC–C and the PSOE.

== History ==
The alliance was conceived within the Catalan parties' efforts at reorganizing the centre-left electoral space ahead of the 1977 Spanish general election. The Socialist Party of Catalonia–Congress (PSC–C) under Joan Reventós aimed for establishing a "Candidacy of Socialist Unity" (Catalan: Candidatura d'Unitat Socialista) with other similarly aligned parties, including the Catalan Federation of the PSOE, the Socialist Party of Catalonia–Regrouping (PSC–R), the Catalan branch of the People's Socialist Party (PSP) and the Carlist Party of Catalonia (PCC), starting in February 1977 and aimed at the "instauration and consolidation of democracy, which, with respect to Catalonia, implies the reestablishment of the Generalitat". Contacts took place amid advancements from the PSC–R's "Left Front" of attracting the PSC–C into their alliance, a decision rejected by the latter on the grounds that its political project and that of the Front "absolutely diverged, in terms of motivations and goals".

Speculation arose in mid-March that negotiations between both the PSOE and the PSC–C were well underway, and on 29 March it was revealed that an agreement had been signed the previous day, under which both parties would advance towards their eventual merging into a single party. It also provided for the eventual incorporation of the PSC–R ahead of a future unification of the entire Catalan socialist space, but because of the agreement's permanent nature, several parties—such as the PSP, the PCC and other minor socialist groups—had been excluded from negotiations, at which these voiced their dissatisfaction by denouncing the "PSOE's hegemonic aspirations". Negotiations for the electoral lists' composition ensued throughout April, and on 4 May it was revealed that the alliance would run under the "Socialists of Catalonia" umbrella, which would score a decisive win in the election by finishing way ahead of the communist Unified Socialist Party of Catalonia (PSUC) and the rival Democratic Pact for Catalonia (PDC).

== Composition ==
Party
| Socialist Party of Catalonia–Congress (PSC–C) |
| Catalan Socialist Federation (PSOE) |

== Electoral performance ==
=== Congress of Deputies ===
Congress of Deputies
| Election | Catalonia | | | | |
| Election | Votes | % | # | Seats | +/– |
| 1977 | 870,362 | 28.56% | 1st | 15 / 47 | — |
