= Socialist Party of Catalonia–Congress =

Socialist Party of Catalonia–Congress Partit Socialista de Catalunya–Congrés
- Secretary-General: Joan Reventós
- Founded: 1 November 1976
- Dissolved: 16 July 1978
- Merger of: Socialist Convergence of Catalonia; Group of Independents for Socialism; People's Party of Catalonia; Political Secretariat of the POUM in Catalonia; Socialist Tendency of the Socialist Party of Catalonia–Regrouping; Movement for Socialism and Self-management; Socialist Reconstruction of Catalonia
- Merged into: Socialists' Party of Catalonia
- Newspaper: L'Hora Socialista
- Youth wing: Moviment de Joves Socialistes de Catalunya
- Ideology: Democratic socialism Catalanism; Marxism; Self-management socialism
- Political position: Left-wing
- National affiliation: Socialists of Catalonia (1977–78); Agreement of the Catalans (1977–78)

Party flag

Socialist Party of Catalonia–Congress (Catalan: Partit Socialista de Catalunya–Congrés, PSC–C) was a political party in Catalonia, Spain. PSC–C was founded in 1976 as a continuation of Socialist Convergence of Catalonia (CSC). It also unified with various sectors originating in Workers' Party of Marxist Unification (POUM), Unified Socialist Party of Catalonia (PSUC) and Republican Left of Catalonia (ERC).

Its first secretary was Joan Reventós. Amongst its other leaders were Raimon Obiols, Narcís Serra and Pasqual Maragall, the former president of the Generalitat de Catalunya.

In the General Elections of 1977 PSC–C stood on joint lists with Spanish Socialist Workers' Party (PSOE) as Socialistes de Catalunya. The lists obtained 28.2% of the votes and 15 seats.

In 1978 PSC–C merged with the Catalan Federation of the PSOE and the Socialist Party of Catalonia–Regrouping, forming Socialists' Party of Catalonia (PSC).

PSC-C published L'Hora Socialista and Company.

== Electoral performance ==
=== Cortes Generales ===
Cortes Generales
Election	Catalonia						
Election	Congress					Senate	
Election	Votes	%	#	Seats	+/–	Seats	+/–
1977	Within SC/EdC			8 / 47	—	3 / 16	—

== See also ==
- Socialists' Party of Catalonia
- Unified Socialist Party of Catalonia
- List of political parties in Catalonia
