= Joan Reventós =

Spanish politician and ambassador (1927-2004)

Joan Reventós i Carner
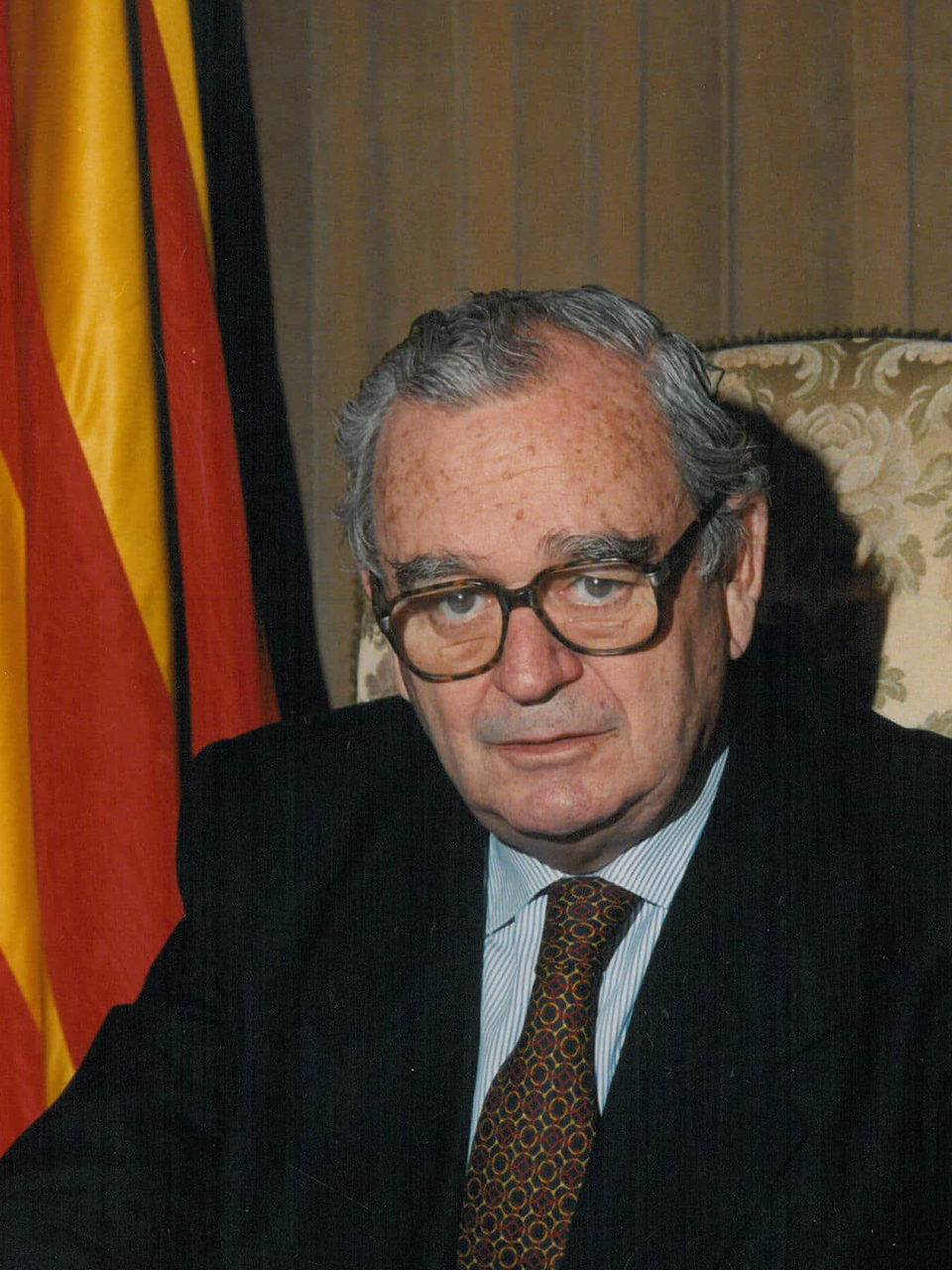

10th President of the Catalan Parliament
- In office 30 November 1995 – 29 November 1999
- Preceded by: Joaquim Xicoy i Bassegoda
- Succeeded by: Joan Rigol

Minister without Portfolio with Jordi Pujol, Antoni Gutiérrez Díaz, Carles Sentís Afruns and Josep Maria Triginer i Fernández
- In office 5 December 1977 – 24 April 1980
- Preceded by: New office
- Succeeded by: Post abolished

Personal details
- Born: 26 July 1927 Barcelona, Catalonia
- Died: 13 January 2004 (aged 76) Barcelona, Catalonia
- Party: Socialist Movement of Catalonia (1945–1974); Socialist Convergence of Catalonia (1974–1976); Socialist Party of Catalonia-Congress (1976–1978); Socialists' Party of Catalonia (1978–2004)
- Occupation: Politician

Joan Reventós i Carner (Catalan pronunciation: [ʒuˈan rəβənˈtos]; 26 July 1927 – 13 January 2004) was the 10th President of the Parliament of Catalonia (1995–1999). He had previously been Minister without Portfolio, from 1977 to 1980. Reventós joined the PSUC in 1976 and the following year was elected to the Spanish national parliament as a deputy for Barcelona Province serving until 1980. He was the Spanish ambassador to France from 1983 to 1986.

Political offices
Preceded by Joaquim Xicoy i Bassegoda	President of the Parliament of Catalonia; 1995–1999	Succeeded by Joan Rigol
Preceded by New office	Minister without Portfolio; With Antoni Guitérrez Diaz, Jordi Pujol, Carles Sentís Afruns and Josep Maria Triginer Fernández; 1977–1980	Succeeded by Post abolished
Assembly seats
Preceded by New title	Leader of the Opposition in the Parliament of Catalonia; 1980–1984	Succeeded by Raimon Obiols
Party political offices
Preceded by New title	President of PSC; 1978–1996	Succeeded by Raimon Obiols
Preceded by New office	First Secretary of PSC; 1978–1983	Succeeded by Raimon Obiols
