= Socialist Party of Catalonia–Regrouping =

Defunct political party in Catalonia

Socialist Party of Catalonia–Regrouping Partit Socialista de Catalunya–Reagrupament
- Secretary-General: Josep Pallach i Carolà
- Founded: 20 May 1976
- Dissolved: 16 July 1978
- Merger of: Socialist and Democratic Regrouping of Catalonia
- Merged into: Socialists' Party of Catalonia
- Youth wing: Movement of the Young Socialists of Catalonia
- Ideology: Social democracy Catalanism; Federalism
- Political position: Centre-left
- National affiliation: Democratic Pact for Catalonia (1977–78); Democracy and Catalonia (1977–78)

Socialist Party of Catalonia–Regrouping (Catalan: Partit Socialista de Catalunya–Reagrupament, PSC–R) was a political party in Catalonia, Spain. The PSC–R was founded in 1976 as a continuation of the Socialist and Democratic Regrouping of Catalonia.

== History ==
Its first secretary was Josep Pallach i Carolà. In the General Elections of 1977 PSC–R stood on joint lists with Democratic Convergence of Catalonia (CDC), Democratic Left of Catalonia and the National Front of Catalonia as the Democratic Pact for Catalonia. The lists obtained the 16.68%% of the votes and 11 seats, 4 of them to the PSC-R.

In 1978 PSC–R merged with the Catalan Federation of the PSOE and the Socialist Party of Catalonia–Congress, forming the Socialists' Party of Catalonia (PSC).

== See also ==
- Socialists' Party of Catalonia
- Unified Socialist Party of Catalonia
- List of political parties in Catalonia
