= Catalan Coexistence =

Catalan Coexistence Convivencia Catalana
- Leader: Laureano López Rodó
- Founded: April 22, 1977
- Dissolved: 1977
- Headquarters: Barcelona, Spain
- Ideology: Conservatism
- Political position: Right-wing
- National affiliation: People's Alliance

Catalan Coexistence (Spanish: Convivencia Catalana, CC) was a Catalonia-based electoral alliance led by the People's Alliance ahead of the 1977 Spanish general election.

== Electoral performance ==
=== Cortes Generales ===
Cortes Generales
Election	Catalonia						
Election	Congress					Senate	
Election	Votes	%	#	Seats	+/–	Seats	+/–
1977	108,333	3.55	7th	1 / 47	—	0 / 16	—

== History ==
On November 9th 1976, The Catalan Pact (or the Pact of Hostalric) was formed in Hostalric between the parties Catalan Union, Democratic Union, Club Catalonia and Democratic Reform.
