= Josep Pallach =

Catalan socialist leader

Josep Pallach i Carolà (born Figueres, Catalonia, 1920 - died l'Hospitalet de Llobregat, Catalonia, 1977) was a Catalan socialist leader. A Libertarian communist during his youth, he fought with the Republic and was a leader of several anti-francoist movements.

== Bibliography ==
- Díaz Rodríguez, Miguel Ángel; Casellas i Noguer, Núria (2020) [2002]. "Josep Pallach". Palafrugell (in Catalan).
- Rubiol, Glòria. "Pallach i Carolà, Josep". Arxiu Històric del Socialisme Català (in Catalan).
- Pagès, Pelai (2003). "Josep Pallach (1920-1977)". Fundación Andreu Nin (in Catalan). Archived from the original on 2009-09-30.
