= Union of the Catalan Left =

Union of the Catalan Left Unió de l'Esquerra Catalana
- Founded: 1986
- Dissolved: 1987
- Succeeded by: Initiative for Catalonia Greens
- Ideology: Socialism; Catalan nationalism
- Political position: Left-wing

Catalan Left Union (Catalan: Unió de l'Esquerra Catalana, UEC) was an electoral coalition in Catalonia, Spain, formed by the Unified Socialist Party of Catalonia (PSUC) and Agreement of Left Nationalists (ENE) in 1986.

== History ==
UEC contested the 1986 election, and received 123,912 votes (0.6% of the votes in Spain, 3.9% of the votes in Catalonia) and one seat in the Spanish parliament. The following year, PSUC formed a new alliance, Initiative for Catalonia. The elected MP was Ramon Espasa i Oliver from Barcelona.
