= Catalan Federation of the PSOE =

Defunct political party in Spain

Catalan Federation of the PSOE Federació Catalana del PSOE
- Secretary-General: Josep Maria Triginer
- Founded: 1880–1882
- Dissolved: 16 July 1978
- Merged into: Socialists' Party of Catalonia
- Newspaper: El Obrero, La Internacional and La Justicia Social
- Youth wing: Socialist Youth of Catalonia
- Union affiliation: Unión General de Trabajadores (UGT)
- Ideology: Marxism; Social democracy
- Political position: Left-wing (until 1974); Centre-left (1974–78)
- National affiliation: Spanish Socialist Workers' Party
- Regional affiliation: Unified Socialist Party of Catalonia (1936–70 de iure, 1936–50's de facto); Socialists of Catalonia (1977–78); Agreement of the Catalans (1977–78)

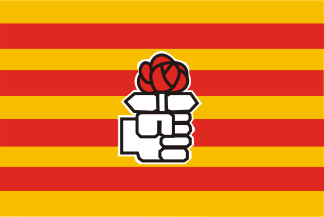

Catalan Federation of the PSOE or Catalan Socialist Federation (Catalan: Federació Catalana del PSOE, FSC) was a political party in Catalonia, Spain. The FSC first groups emerged between 1880 and 1882.

== History ==
In 1888, the FSC promoted the creation of the Unión General de Trabajadores (UGT) in Barcelona. Later, well into the twentieth century, in 1908, Antoni Badia and Antoni Badia (??) participated in the establishment of the "Regional Confederation of Societies of Solidarity - Workers Solidarity". The leaders and members of the Federation actively participated in the general strike of 1909 in Barcelona, known as the Tragic Week. The subsequent repression left the party disorganized; but the FSC emerged with new impetus at the end of next year (1910) with the appointment of Josep Recasens as its Secretary General.

In 1923 the FSC suffered a split, that collaborated with Esquerra Republicana de Catalunya, the Socialist Union of Catalonia. in 1933 the FSC participated in the formation of the Workers' Alliance and in 1936 in the Unified Socialist Party of Catalonia, together with other organizations if socialist and communist orientation, disappearing therefore the PSOE in Catalonia, and falling the PSUC in the Communist orbit. Rafael Vidiella i Franch was then a prominent member.

In Francoist Spain, the PSOE was rebuilt in clandestinity in Catalonia, maintaining close relations with the Socialist Movement of Catalonia (MSC). Prominent members of the PSOE in Catalonia, like Juan García acted in close collaboration with the MSC members in clandestine actions, such the Barcelona tram strikes of 1957 and 1951. In the 1970s, the PSOE fully reactivated its federation in Catalonia, under the direction of Josep Maria Triginer i Fernández.

The FSC contested the general elections of 1977 in coalition with the Socialist Party of Catalonia-Congress (PSC-C), under the name Socialistes de Catalunya, gaining the coalition 15 of the 47 seats at stake (four of them of federation). In the Spanish Senate, the FSC supported the candidacy of Agreement of the Catalans (although the list won 12 senators, none of the candidates belonged to the PSOE). The coalition Socialistes de Catalunya was the first step towards the unification of the Catalan socialist movement, that culminated a year later. On 16 July 1978, at a Congress held in Barcelona, the Federation, the Socialist Party of Catalonia–Congress and the Socialist Party of Catalonia–Regrouping formed the Socialists' Party of Catalonia.

== Electoral performance ==
=== Cortes Generales ===
Cortes Generales
Election	Catalonia						
Election	Congress					Senate	
Election	Votes	%	#	Seats	+/–	Seats	+/–
1977	Within SC/EdC			7 / 47	—	4 / 16	—

== See also ==
- Socialists' Party of Catalonia
- Unified Socialist Party of Catalonia
- List of political parties in Catalonia
