= Socialists' Party of Catalonia =

Socialists' Party of Catalonia Partit dels Socialistes de Catalunya
- First Secretary: Salvador Illa
- President: Miquel Iceta
- Vice President: Núria Marín
- Founded: 16 July 1978
- Merger of: Socialist Party of Catalonia–Congress; Socialist Party of Catalonia–Regrouping; Catalan Federation of the PSOE
- Headquarters: c/ Nicaragua, 75–77; 08029 Barcelona
- Newspaper: Endavant Digital
- Youth wing: Socialist Youth of Catalonia
- Membership (2023): ▼12,000
- Ideology: Social democracy; Federalism; Catalanism; Christian humanism
- Political position: Centre to centre-left
- National affiliation: Spanish Socialist Workers' Party
- European affiliation: Progressive Alliance of Socialists and Democrats
- Congress of Deputies: 19 / 48 (Catalan seats)
- Spanish Senate: 15 / 24 (Catalan seats)
- Parliament of Catalonia: 40 / 135 (Note: In coalition with the center-right United to Advance.)
- European Parliament (Spanish seats): 2 / 59
- Mayors: 130 / 947
- Local government: 1,453 / 9,139
- County councils: 8 / 40
- County councilors: 198 / 1,028

Website
- www.socialistes.cat

The Socialists' Party of Catalonia (Catalan: Partit dels Socialistes de Catalunya [pərˈtid dəls susiəˈlistəz də kətəˈluɲə], PSC [ˈpe ˈesə ˈse]) is a social democratic political party in Catalonia, Spain. It was formed through the merger of three parties: the Socialist Party of Catalonia–Regrouping, the Socialist Party of Catalonia–Congress, and the Catalan Federation of the PSOE. It serves as the Catalan regional section of the Spanish Socialist Workers' Party (PSOE). The party was also allied with the federalist and republican political platform Citizens for Change (Ciutadans pel Canvi) until the 2010 election. The party's primary electoral strongholds are the Barcelona metropolitan area and the comarques of Tarragonès, Montsià, and Val d'Aran, the latter of which is represented by its own autonomous section, Unity of Aran.

== Political positions ==
=== Economic and social issues ===
==== Environment ====
The party advocates for environmental protection by implementing sustainable development strategies intended to balance economic advancement with social welfare.

==== Market Economy ====
The party supports "individual initiative, entrepreneurial freedom, and innovation within the context of a socially accountable market."

=== Foreign policy ===
==== European Union ====
The party supports the European Union and its expansion into the Mediterranean region. It favours reform policies aimed at fostering an inclusive and cohesive society.

=== National identity and the territorial question ===
The party is considered a Catalanist party; it defends Catalonia's status as a nation, and regularly uses the word "country" to refer to Catalonia in public statements. However the party opposes Catalan independence and advocates a federalist resolution to the Catalan territorial debate. It seeks to establish a federal Spanish State that formally recognizes Catalan nationhood, grants further devolution to the Catalan Government, and officially protects Spanish multilingualism. While the party largely aligns with the territorial policy of the national PSOE, it represents a more federalist and peripheral nationalist position within that framework. This stance positions the party near the center of the Catalan political spectrum, allowing it to form coalitions with pro-independence parties such as Republican Left of Catalonia or Together for Catalonia (Junts) as well as Spanish unionist parties such as the People's Party.

Given its history as a big-tent merger of various social-democratic factions, the PSC encompasses a wide range of views on the question of nationalism. Some factions lean more strongly toward Catalan nationalism, while others align more closely with Spanish unionism. Both, however, operate within the broader party consensus of Catalanism and Spanish federalism.

=== Language policy ===
The Socialists' Party of Catalonia supports policies that promote the use of the Catalan language. It favours Catalan linguistic immersion in schools, a Catalan-dominated public linguistic landscape and all efforts to improve proficiency in and public usage of the Catalan language. The first Minister for Linguistic Policy of the history of the Catalan Government was appointed by the party, albeit following an agreement with the Republican Left of Catalonia. The party mainly uses Catalan in its official messaging, and governments in which it participates generally pass pro-Catalan language legislation. However, because a significant portion of its constituents are Spanish-speaking, the party regularly uses Spanish in political rallies. Given this dualism, observers often consider the party less strictly committed to language policy than pro-independence parties or other federalists such as Catalunya en Comú.

== Electoral performance ==
=== Parliament of Catalonia ===
Parliament of Catalonia
| Election | Leading candidate | Votes | % | Seats | Gov. |
| 1980 | Joan Reventós | 606,717 | 22.4 (#2) | 33 / 135 | No |
| 1984 | Raimon Obiols | 866,281 | 30.1 (#2) | 41 / 135 | No |
| 1988 | Raimon Obiols | 802,828 | 29.8 (#2) | 42 / 135 | No |
| 1992 | Raimon Obiols | 728,311 | 27.5 (#2) | 40 / 135 | No |
| 1995 | Joaquim Nadal | 802,252 | 24.9 (#2) | 34 / 135 | No |
| 1999 (Note: Electoral alliance with Citizens for Change, and with Initiative for Catalonia–Greens in Girona, Lleida and Tarragona.) | Pasqual Maragall | 1,183,299 | 37.9 (#1) | 52 / 135 | No |
| 2003 (Note: Electoral alliance with Citizens for Change.) | Pasqual Maragall | 1,031,454 | 31.2 (#1) | 42 / 135 | Yes |
| 2006 | José Montilla | 796,173 | 26.8 (#2) | 37 / 135 | Yes |
| 2010 | José Montilla | 575,233 | 18.4 (#2) | 28 / 135 | No |
| 2012 | Pere Navarro | 524,707 | 14.4 (#2) | 20 / 135 | No |
| 2015 | Miquel Iceta | 523,283 | 12.7 (#3) | 16 / 135 | No |
| 2017 | Miquel Iceta | 606,659 | 13.9 (#4) | 17 / 135 | No |
| 2021 | Salvador Illa | 654,766 | 23.0 (#1) | 33 / 135 | No |
| 2024 | Salvador Illa | 882,589 | 28.0 (#1) | 42 / 135 | Yes |

=== Cortes Generales ===
Cortes Generales
| Election | Catalonia | | | |
| Election | Congress | | | Senate |
| Election | Votes | % | Seats | Seats |
| 1979 | 875,529 | 29.7 (#1) | 17 / 47 | 6 / 16 |
| 1982 | 1,575,601 | 45.8 (#1) | 25 / 47 | 9 / 16 |
| 1986 | 1,299,733 | 41.0 (#1) | 21 / 47 | 8 / 16 |
| 1989 | 1,123,975 | 35.6 (#1) | 20 / 46 | 6 / 16 |
| 1993 | 1,277,838 | 34.9 (#1) | 18 / 47 | 6 / 16 |
| 1996 | 1,531,143 | 39.4 (#1) | 19 / 46 | 8 / 16 |
| 2000 | 1,150,533 | 34.1 (#1) | 17 / 46 | 7 / 16 |
| 2004 | 1,586,748 | 39.5 (#1) | 21 / 47 | 8 / 16 |
| 2008 | 1,689,911 | 45.4 (#1) | 25 / 47 | 8 / 16 |
| 2011 | 922,547 | 26.7 (#2) | 14 / 47 | 6 / 16 |
| 2015 | 590,274 | 15.7 (#3) | 8 / 47 | 0 / 16 |
| 2016 | 559,870 | 16.1 (#3) | 7 / 47 | 0 / 16 |
| Apr. 2019 | 962,257 | 23.2 (#2) | 12 / 48 | 3 / 16 |
| Nov. 2019 | 794,666 | 20.5 (#2) | 12 / 48 | 2 / 16 |
| 2023 | 1,221,335 | 34.5 (#1) | 19 / 48 | 12 / 16 |

=== European Parliament ===
European Parliament
| Election | Catalonia | |
| Election | Votes | % |
| 1987 | 1,116,348 | 36.8 (#1) |
| 1989 | 865,506 | 36.4 (#1) |
| 1994 | 721,374 | 28.2 (#2) |
| 1999 | 997,311 | 34.6 (#1) |
| 2004 | 907,121 | 42.9 (#1) |
| 2009 | 708,888 | 36.0 (#1) |
| 2014 | 359,214 | 14.3 (#3) |
| 2019 | 756,231 | 22.1 (#2) |
| 2024 | 734,741 | 30.6 (#1) |

== Party leaders ==
=== First Secretaries ===
- Joan Reventós, 1978–1983
- Raimon Obiols, 1983–1996
- Narcís Serra, 1996–2000
- José Montilla, 2000–2011
- Pere Navarro, 2011–2014
- Miquel Iceta, 2014–2021
- Salvador Illa, 2021–present

=== Presidents ===
- Joan Reventós, 1983–1996
- Raimon Obiols, 1996–2000
- Pasqual Maragall, 2000–2007
- José Montilla, 2007–2008 (acting)
- Isidre Molas, 2008–2011
- Àngel Ros, 2014–2019
- Núria Marín, 2019–2021
- Miquel Iceta, 2021–present

== See also ==
- Unified Socialist Party of Catalonia
- Socialist Party of Catalonia-Congress
- List of political parties in Catalonia
