= Results of the 1996 Spanish Congress election =

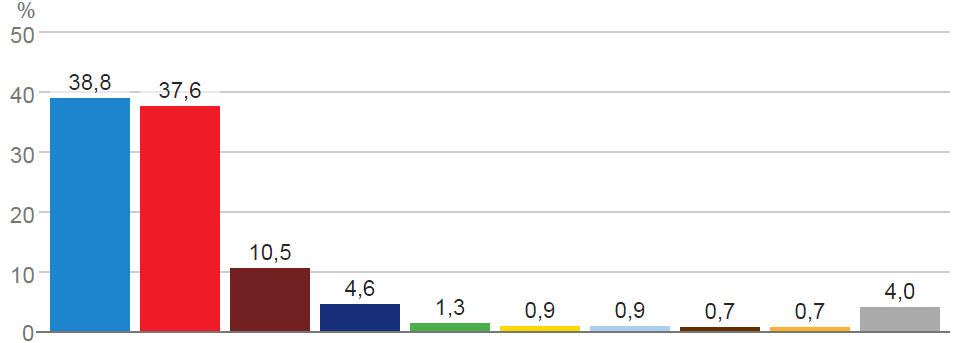
(Spain)	Main: 1996 Spanish general election
← 1993 3 March 1996 2000 →
Party		Votes	%	Seats
	PP	9,716,006	38.8%	156
	PSOE	9,425,678	37.6%	141
	IU	2,639,774	10.5%	21
	CiU	1,151,633	4.6%	16
	EAJ/PNV	318,951	1.3%	5
	CC	220,418	0.9%	4
	BNG	220,147	0.9%	2
	HB	181,304	0.7%	2
	ERC	167,641	0.7%	1
	Others	1,004,724	4.0%	2
Total		25,046,276	100.0%	350

This article presents the results breakdown of the election to the Congress of Deputies held in Spain on 3 March 1996. The following tables show detailed results in each of the country's 17 autonomous communities and in the autonomous cities of Ceuta and Melilla, as well as a summary of constituency and regional results.

== Nationwide ==
← Summary of the 3 March 1996 Congress of Deputies election results →
Parties and alliances	Popular vote			Seats	
Parties and alliances	Votes	%	±pp	Total	+/−
People's Party (PP)^{1}	9,716,006	38.79	+3.42	156	+14
Spanish Socialist Workers' Party (PSOE)	9,425,678	37.63	−1.15	141	−18
United Left (IU)	2,639,774	10.54	+0.99	21	+3
Convergence and Union (CiU)	1,151,633	4.60	−0.34	16	−1
Basque Nationalist Party (EAJ/PNV)	318,951	1.27	+0.03	5	±0
Canarian Coalition (CC)	220,418	0.88	±0.00	4	±0
Galician Nationalist Bloc (BNG)	220,147	0.88	+0.34	2	+2
Popular Unity (HB)	181,304	0.72	−0.16	2	±0
Republican Left of Catalonia (ERC)	167,641	0.67	−0.13	1	±0
Andalusian Party (PA)^{2}	134,800	0.54	−0.05	0	±0
Basque Solidarity (EA)	115,861	0.46	−0.09	1	±0
Valencian Union (UV)	91,575	0.37	−0.11	1	±0
The European Greens (LVE)	61,689	0.25	−0.54	0	±0
Aragonese Union (CHA)	49,739	0.20	+0.17	0	±0
Centrist Union (UC)	44,771	0.18	−1.58	0	±0
Valencian People's Union–Nationalist Bloc (UPV–BN)	26,777	0.11	−0.06	0	±0
Nationalists of the Balearic Islands (PSM–ENE)	24,644	0.10	+0.01	0	±0
The Greens–Green Group (LV–GV)	17,177	0.07	New	0	±0
Convergence of Democrats of Navarre (CDN)	17,020	0.07	New	0	±0
Workers' Revolutionary Party (PRT)^{3}	14,854	0.06	−0.07	0	±0
Communist Party of the Peoples of Spain (PCPE)	14,513	0.06	+0.02	0	±0
Humanist Party (PH)	13,482	0.05	+0.01	0	±0
Asturianist Party (PAS)	12,213	0.05	±0.00	0	±0
Authentic Spanish Phalanx (FEA)	12,114	0.05	+0.05	0	±0
Leonese People's Union (UPL)	12,049	0.05	−0.01	0	±0
Basque Citizen Initiative (ICV–Gorordo)	11,833	0.05	New	0	±0
The Greens of Madrid (LVM)	8,483	0.03	New	0	±0
Extremaduran Coalition (CEx)^{4}	7,312	0.03	−0.03	0	±0
Majorcan Union (UM)	6,943	0.03	−0.01	0	±0
Commoners' Land–Castilian Nationalist Party (TC–PNC)	6,206	0.02	±0.00	0	±0
Riojan Party (PR)	6,065	0.02	−0.01	0	±0
Ecologist Party of Catalonia (PEC)	4,305	0.02	−0.02	0	±0
Regionalist Unity of Castile and León (URCL)	4,061	0.02	+0.01	0	±0
Andalusian Nation (NA)	3,505	0.01	New	0	±0
Alliance for National Unity (AUN)	3,397	0.01	New	0	±0
Salamanca–Zamora–León–PREPAL (PREPAL)	2,762	0.01	±0.00	0	±0
SOS Nature (SOS)	2,753	0.01	New	0	±0
Republican Coalition (CR)^{5}	2,744	0.01	−0.02	0	±0
Popular Front of the Canary Islands (FREPIC)	2,567	0.01	New	0	±0
Socialist Party of the People of Ceuta (PSPC)	2,365	0.01	+0.01	0	±0
Regionalist Party of Castilla–La Mancha (PRCM)	2,279	0.01	New	0	±0
Galician People's Front (FPG)	2,065	0.01	New	0	±0
Independent Socialists of Extremadura (SIEx)	1,678	0.01	New	0	±0
Madrilenian Independent Regional Party (PRIM)	1,671	0.01	±0.00	0	±0
Red–Green Party (PRV)	1,656	0.01	New	0	±0
Independent Spanish Phalanx (FEI)	1,550	0.01	±0.00	0	±0
New Region (NR)	1,452	0.01	New	0	±0
Republican Action (AR)	1,237	0.00	−0.01	0	±0
Citizen Independent Platform of Catalonia (PICC)	1,229	0.00	New	0	±0
Valencian Nationalist Left (ENV)	1,023	0.00	−0.01	0	±0
Party of El Bierzo (PB)	1,000	0.00	−0.01	0	±0
Nationalist Canarian Party (PCN)	722	0.00	New	0	±0
Alicantine Provincial Union (UPRA)	651	0.00	±0.00	0	±0
Democratic Andalusian Unity (UAD)	627	0.00	New	0	±0
Citizen Democratic Action (ADEC)	598	0.00	New	0	±0
Voice of the Andalusian People (VDPA)	529	0.00	New	0	±0
European Nation State (N)	495	0.00	New	0	±0
Social and Autonomist Liberal Group (ALAS)	402	0.00	New	0	±0
Balearic Alliance (ABA)	379	0.00	New	0	±0
Regionalist Party of Guadalajara (PRGU)	338	0.00	±0.00	0	±0
Spanish Autonomous League (LAE)	296	0.00	New	0	±0
Aragonese Social Dynamic (DSA)	265	0.00	New	0	±0
Party of The People (LG)	243	0.00	±0.00	0	±0
Inter-Zamoran Party (PIZ)	215	0.00	New	0	±0
Nationalist Party of Melilla (PNM)	200	0.00	New	0	±0
Centrists of the Valencian Community (CCV)	0	0.00	New	0	±0
Revolutionary Workers' Party (POR)	0	0.00	−0.03	0	±0
Party of Self-employed of Spain (PAE)	0	0.00	New	0	±0
Tenerife Independent Familiar Groups (AFIT)	0	0.00	New	0	±0
Blank ballots	243,345	0.97	+0.17		
Total	25,046,276			350	±0
Valid votes	25,046,276	99.50	+0.04		
Invalid votes	125,782	0.50	−0.04		
Votes cast / turnout	25,172,058	77.38	+0.94		
Abstentions	7,359,775	22.62	−0.94		
Registered voters	32,531,833				
Sources
Footnotes: ^{1} People's Party results are compared to the combined totals of the People's Party and the Aragonese Party in the 1993 election.; ^{2} Andalusian Party results are compared to the combined totals of Andalusian Party and Andalusian Progress Party in the 1993 election.; ^{3} Workers' Revolutionary Party results are compared to Workers' Socialist Party totals in the 1993 election.; ^{4} Extremaduran Coalition results are compared to the combined totals of United Extremadura and Extremaduran Regionalist Party in the 1993 election.; ^{5} Republican Coalition results are compared to Coalition for a New Socialist Party totals in the 1993 election.

== Summary ==
=== Constituencies ===

Summary of constituency results in the 3 March 1996 Congress of Deputies election
Constituency	PP		PSOE		IU		CiU		PNV		CC		BNG		HB		ERC		EA		UV	
Constituency	%	S	%	S	%	S	%	S	%	S	%	S	%	S	%	S	%	S	%	S	%	S
Álava	27.3	2	25.4	1	11.7	−			20.2	1					7.5	−			5.6	−		
Albacete	44.7	2	43.9	2	9.6	−																
Alicante	45.7	5	40.0	5	10.6	1											0.1	−			0.5	−
Almería	40.2	2	47.1	3	9.9	−																
Asturias	41.0	4	39.9	4	15.5	1																
Ávila	58.7	2	30.4	1	7.7	−																
Badajoz	39.2	3	48.8	3	9.9	−																
Balearics	45.1	4	36.0	3	7.7	−											0.4	−				
Barcelona	18.4	6	40.3	13	8.7	2	27.4	9									3.8	1				
Biscay	18.4	2	23.8	2	9.7	1			29.2	3					9.9	1			5.2	−		
Burgos	54.4	3	30.8	1	11.1	−																
Cáceres	42.0	2	47.9	3	7.3	−																
Cádiz	35.4	4	43.9	4	13.2	1																
Cantabria	50.5	3	35.6	2	11.4	−																
Castellón	46.5	3	40.0	2	7.6	−											0.3	−			2.0	−
Ceuta	53.2	1	35.8	−	2.2	−																
Ciudad Real	45.0	2	45.2	3	8.2	−																
Córdoba	33.0	2	44.6	4	18.6	1																
Cuenca	50.2	2	42.4	1	5.6	−																
Girona	12.0	−	36.5	2	3.4	−	41.4	3									5.6	−				
Granada	38.4	3	46.5	3	12.0	1																
Guadalajara	51.9	2	34.9	1	10.7	−																
Guipúzcoa	14.3	1	22.7	2	7.3	−			19.7	1					18.4	1			14.7	1		
Huelva	33.9	2	52.1	3	10.2	−																
Huesca	45.6	2	41.1	1	7.5	−																
Jaén	36.9	3	48.7	3	11.7	−																
La Coruña	47.3	5	33.9	3	4.3	−							12.7	1								
La Rioja	49.4	2	36.6	2	8.7	−																
Las Palmas	42.4	3	25.9	2	5.7	−					24.0	2										
León	48.7	3	37.9	2	7.7	−																
Lleida	17.9	1	33.0	1	3.3	−	39.3	2									5.6	−				
Lugo	53.5	3	32.5	1	2.6	−							10.0	−								
Madrid	49.3	17	31.4	11	16.4	6																
Málaga	38.5	4	42.0	5	15.2	1																
Melilla	50.6	1	43.3	−	3.5	−																
Murcia	49.9	5	38.0	3	10.5	1																
Navarre	37.1	2	30.3	2	12.4	1			1.0	−					8.2	−			3.8	−		
Orense	48.8	2	36.3	2	1.7	−							12.1	−								
Palencia	51.3	2	37.9	1	7.9	−																
Pontevedra	47.1	4	32.5	3	4.1	−							14.6	1								
Salamanca	54.1	3	35.0	1	8.1	−																
Santa Cruz de Tenerife	32.4	2	34.5	3	5.2	−					26.3	2										
Segovia	54.8	2	32.2	1	8.9	−																
Seville	31.4	4	50.1	7	13.4	2																
Soria	55.2	2	34.3	1	7.9	−																
Tarragona	20.1	1	38.1	3	5.1	−	30.8	2									4.9	−				
Teruel	49.2	2	41.2	1	6.0	−																
Toledo	48.2	3	41.8	2	8.2	−																
Valencia	42.0	7	37.0	6	12.1	2											0.1	−			5.6	1
Valladolid	48.9	3	35.8	2	12.6	−																
Zamora	54.0	2	37.0	1	5.6	−																
Zaragoza	48.3	4	31.9	3	10.1	−																
Total	38.8	156	37.6	141	10.5	21	4.6	16	1.3	5	0.9	4	0.9	2	0.7	2	0.7	1	0.5	1	0.4	1

=== Regions ===

Summary of regional results in the 3 March 1996 Congress of Deputies election
Region	PP		PSOE		IU		CiU		PNV		CC		BNG		HB		ERC		EA		UV	
Region	%	S	%	S	%	S	%	S	%	S	%	S	%	S	%	S	%	S	%	S	%	S
Andalusia	35.4	24	46.7	32	13.5	6																
Aragon	47.9	8	34.6	5	9.1	−																
Asturias	41.0	4	39.9	4	15.5	1																
Balearics	45.1	4	36.0	3	7.7	−											0.4	−				
Basque Country	18.3	5	23.7	5	9.2	1			25.0	5					12.3	2			8.2	1		
Canary Islands	37.6	5	30.0	5	5.5	−					25.1	4										
Cantabria	50.5	3	35.6	2	11.4	−																
Castile and León	52.2	22	35.0	11	9.1	−																
Castilla–La Mancha	47.2	11	42.6	9	8.4	−																
Catalonia	18.0	8	39.4	19	7.6	2	29.6	16									4.2	1				
Ceuta	53.2	1	35.8	−	2.2	−																
Extremadura	40.3	5	48.4	6	8.9	−																
Galicia	48.3	14	33.5	9	3.6	−							12.9	2								
La Rioja	49.4	2	36.6	2	8.7	−																
Madrid	49.3	17	31.4	11	16.4	6																
Melilla	50.6	1	43.3	−	3.5	−																
Murcia	49.9	5	38.0	3	10.5	1																
Navarre	37.1	2	30.3	2	12.4	1			1.0	−					8.2	−			3.8	−		
Valencian Community	43.7	15	38.3	13	11.1	3											0.1	–			3.5	1
Total	38.8	156	37.6	141	10.5	21	4.6	16	1.3	5	0.9	4	0.9	2	0.7	2	0.7	1	0.5	1	0.4	1

== Autonomous communities ==
=== Andalusia ===
← Summary of the 3 March 1996 Congress of Deputies election results in Andalusia →
Parties and alliances	Popular vote			Seats	
Parties and alliances	Votes	%	±pp	Total	+/−
Spanish Socialist Workers' Party of Andalusia (PSOE–A)	2,017,857	46.66	−4.79	32	−5
People's Party (PP)	1,530,057	35.38	+5.58	24	+4
United Left/The Greens–Assembly for Andalusia (IULV–CA)	582,970	13.48	+1.40	6	+2
Andalusian Party (PA)^{1}	134,800	3.12	−0.37	0	±0
Communist Party of the Andalusian People (PCPA)	5,309	0.12	−0.01	0	±0
Andalusian Nation (NA)	3,505	0.08	New	0	±0
Authentic Spanish Phalanx (FEA)	3,249	0.08	New	0	±0
Centrist Union (UC)	3,092	0.07	−0.80	0	±0
Workers' Revolutionary Party (PRT)^{2}	2,816	0.07	±0.00	0	±0
Humanist Party (PH)	2,784	0.06	+0.03	0	±0
Democratic Andalusian Unity (UAD)	627	0.01	New	0	±0
Voice of the Andalusian People (VDPA)	529	0.01	New	0	±0
Alliance for National Unity (AUN)	351	0.01	New	0	±0
Independent Spanish Phalanx (FEI)	346	0.01	±0.00	0	±0
Blank ballots	36,055	0.83	+0.31		
Total	4,324,347			62	+1
Valid votes	4,324,347	99.42	−0.15		
Invalid votes	25,418	0.58	+0.15		
Votes cast / turnout	4,349,765	78.00	+1.80		
Abstentions	1,226,813	22.00	−1.80		
Registered voters	5,576,578				
Sources
Footnotes: ^{1} Andalusian Party results are compared to the combined totals of Andalusian Party and Andalusian Progress Party in the 1993 election.; ^{2} Workers' Revolutionary Party results are compared to Workers' Socialist Party totals in the 1993 election.

=== Aragon ===
← Summary of the 3 March 1996 Congress of Deputies election results in Aragon →
Parties and alliances	Popular vote			Seats	
Parties and alliances	Votes	%	±pp	Total	+/−
People's Party–Aragonese Party (PP–PAR)^{1}	370,975	47.92	−3.96	8	+3
Spanish Socialist Workers' Party (PSOE)	268,189	34.64	+0.31	5	−2
United Left of Aragon (IU)	70,755	9.14	−0.57	0	−1
Aragonese Union (CHA)	49,739	6.42	+5.59	0	±0
SOS Nature (SOS)	2,753	0.36	New	0	±0
Workers' Revolutionary Party (PRT)^{2}	710	0.09	−0.13	0	±0
Authentic Spanish Phalanx (FEA)	613	0.08	New	0	±0
Centrist Union (UC)	521	0.07	−1.28	0	±0
Humanist Party (PH)	299	0.04	+0.01	0	±0
Aragonese Social Dynamics (DSA)	265	0.03	New	0	±0
Blank ballots	9,359	1.21	+0.49		
Total	774,178			13	±0
Valid votes	774,178	99.51	+0.10		
Invalid votes	3,820	0.49	−0.10		
Votes cast / turnout	777,998	77.46	−0.70		
Abstentions	226,404	22.54	+0.70		
Registered voters	1,004,402				
Sources
Footnotes: ^{1} People's Party–Aragonese Party results are compared to the combined totals of the People's Party and the Aragonese Party in the 1993 election.; ^{2} Workers' Revolutionary Party results are compared to Workers' Socialist Party totals in the 1993 election.

=== Asturias ===
← Summary of the 3 March 1996 Congress of Deputies election results in Asturias →
Parties and alliances	Popular vote			Seats	
Parties and alliances	Votes	%	±pp	Total	+/−
People's Party (PP)	297,079	41.03	+3.66	4	±0
Spanish Socialist Workers' Party (PSOE)	288,558	39.85	+0.53	4	±0
United Left (IU)	112,339	15.51	+0.07	1	±0
Asturianist Party (PAS)	12,213	1.69	+0.09	0	±0
The Greens of Asturias (Verdes)	3,575	0.49	−0.17	0	±0
Centrist Union (UC)	1,709	0.24	−3.43	0	±0
Communist Party of the Peoples of Spain (PCPE)	813	0.11	−0.15	0	±0
Workers' Revolutionary Party (PRT)^{1}	497	0.07	−0.26	0	±0
Authentic Spanish Phalanx (FEA)	487	0.07	New	0	±0
Blank ballots	6,805	0.94	+0.03		
Total	724,075			9	±0
Valid votes	724,075	99.52	−0.07		
Invalid votes	3,492	0.48	+0.07		
Votes cast / turnout	727,567	75.91	+0.48		
Abstentions	230,845	24.09	−0.48		
Registered voters	958,412				
Sources
Footnotes: ^{1} Workers' Revolutionary Party results are compared to Workers' Socialist Party totals in the 1993 election.

=== Balearics ===
← Summary of the 3 March 1996 Congress of Deputies election results in the Balearics →
Parties and alliances	Popular vote			Seats	
Parties and alliances	Votes	%	±pp	Total	+/−
People's Party (PP)	194,859	45.13	−1.28	4	±0
Spanish Socialist Workers' Party (PSOE)	155,244	35.95	+1.98	3	±0
United Left of the Balearic Islands (IU)	33,224	7.69	+1.73	0	±0
Nationalists of the Balearic Islands (PSM–ENE)	24,644	5.71	+0.83	0	±0
The Greens of the Balearic Islands (EVIB)	9,539	2.21	+0.04	0	±0
Majorcan Union (UM)	6,943	1.61	−0.83	0	±0
Republican Left of Catalonia (ERC)	1,802	0.42	−0.27	0	±0
Centrist Union (UC)	449	0.10	−1.75	0	±0
Republican Coalition (CR)^{1}	384	0.09	±0.00	0	±0
Balearic Alliance (ABA)	379	0.09	New	0	±0
Blank ballots	4,318	1.00	+0.16		
Total	431,785			7	±0
Valid votes	431,785	99.42	−0.02		
Invalid votes	2,503	0.58	+0.02		
Votes cast / turnout	434,288	71.63	−0.93		
Abstentions	172,041	28.31	+0.93		
Registered voters	606,329				
Sources
Footnotes: ^{1} Republican Coalition results are compared to Coalition for a New Socialist Party totals in the 1993 election.

=== Basque Country ===
← Summary of the 3 March 1996 Congress of Deputies election results in the Basque Country →
Parties and alliances	Popular vote			Seats	
Parties and alliances	Votes	%	±pp	Total	+/−
Basque Nationalist Party (EAJ/PNV)	315,793	25.04	+0.99	5	±0
Socialist Party of the Basque Country–Basque Country Left (PSE–EE (PSOE))	298,499	23.67	−0.85	5	−2
People's Party (PP)	231,286	18.34	+3.66	5	+1
Popular Unity (HB)	154,853	12.28	−2.31	2	±0
United Left (IU/EB)	116,133	9.21	+2.90	1	+1
Basque Solidarity (EA)	103,628	8.22	−1.63	1	±0
Basque Citizen Initiative (ICV–Gorordo)	11,833	0.94	New	0	±0
European Greens–Basque Country Greens (VE–EHB)	6,031	0.48	−0.54	0	±0
Workers' Revolutionary Party (PRT)^{1}	1,246	0.10	−0.16	0	±0
Humanist Party (PH)	958	0.08	+0.05	0	±0
Centrist Union (UC)	879	0.07	−0.69	0	±0
Republican Coalition (CR)^{2}	331	0.03	−0.01	0	±0
Authentic Spanish Phalanx (FEA)	139	0.01	New	0	±0
Independent Spanish Phalanx (FEI)	138	0.01	New	0	±0
Revolutionary Workers' Party (POR)	0	0.00	−0.06	0	±0
Blank ballots	19,551	1.55	−0.04		
Total	1,261,298			19	±0
Valid votes	1,261,298	99.31	+0.08		
Invalid votes	8,777	0.69	−0.08		
Votes cast / turnout	1,270,075	71.53	+1.80		
Abstentions	505,605	28.47	−1.80		
Registered voters	1,775,680				
Sources
Footnotes: ^{1} Workers' Revolutionary Party results are compared to Workers' Socialist Party totals in the 1993 election.; ^{2} Republican Coalition results are compared to Coalition for a New Socialist Party totals in the 1993 election.

=== Canary Islands ===
← Summary of the 3 March 1996 Congress of Deputies election results in the Canary Islands →
Parties and alliances	Popular vote			Seats	
Parties and alliances	Votes	%	±pp	Total	+/−
People's Party (PP)	330,513	37.62	+3.69	5	±0
Spanish Socialist Workers' Party (PSOE)	263,249	29.97	+0.12	5	±0
Canarian Coalition (CC)	220,418	25.09	−0.49	4	±0
Canarian United Left (IUC)	48,172	5.48	+0.50	0	±0
The Greens–Green Group (LV–GV)	3,362	0.38	New	0	±0
Popular Front of the Canary Islands (FREPIC)	2,567	0.29	New	0	±0
Communist Party of the Canarian People (PCPC)	1,180	0.13	+0.02	0	±0
Centrist Union (UC)	1,170	0.13	−1.09	0	±0
Green Left of the Canary Islands (Izegzawen)	1,117	0.13	New	0	±0
Humanist Party (PH)	734	0.08	+0.01	0	±0
Nationalist Canarian Party (PCN)	722	0.08	New	0	±0
Party of The People (LG)	243	0.03	−0.02	0	±0
Tenerife Independent Familiar Groups (AFIT)	0	0.00	New	0	±0
Blank ballots	5,017	0.57	−0.06		
Total	878,464			14	±0
Valid votes	878,464	99.58	+0.33		
Invalid votes	3,699	0.42	−0.33		
Votes cast / turnout	882,163	69.14	+0.22		
Abstentions	393,751	30.86	−0.22		
Registered voters	1,275,914				

=== Cantabria ===
← Summary of the 3 March 1996 Congress of Deputies election results in Cantabria →
Parties and alliances	Popular vote			Seats	
Parties and alliances	Votes	%	±pp	Total	+/−
People's Party (PP)	175,651	50.47	+13.44	3	+1
Spanish Socialist Workers' Party (PSOE)	123,940	35.61	−1.56	2	−1
United Left (IU)	39,541	11.36	+3.94	0	±0
Centrist Union (UC)	1,408	0.40	−1.14	0	±0
Communist Party of the Peoples of Spain (PCPE)	640	0.18	+0.02	0	±0
Humanist Party (PH)	608	0.17	+0.10	0	±0
Workers' Revolutionary Party (PRT)^{1}	377	0.11	−0.11	0	±0
Republican Action (AR)	257	0.07	+0.02	0	±0
Blank ballots	5,578	1.60	+0.31		
Total	348,000			5	±0
Valid votes	348,000	99.29	+0.10		
Invalid votes	2,477	0.71	−0.10		
Votes cast / turnout	350,477	79.31	+0.33		
Abstentions	91,457	20.69	−0.33		
Registered voters	441,934				
Sources
Footnotes: ^{1} Workers' Revolutionary Party results are compared to Workers' Socialist Party totals in the 1993 election.

=== Castile and León ===
← Summary of the 3 March 1996 Congress of Deputies election results in Castile and León →
Parties and alliances	Popular vote			Seats	
Parties and alliances	Votes	%	±pp	Total	+/−
People's Party (PP)	878,981	52.20	+4.83	22	+2
Spanish Socialist Workers' Party (PSOE)	589,869	35.03	−1.68	11	−2
United Left of Castile and León (IUCL)	153,705	9.13	+0.99	0	±0
Leonese People's Union (UPL)	12,049	0.72	−0.03	0	±0
Centrist Union (UC)	7,327	0.44	−3.70	0	±0
Commoners' Land–Castilian Nationalist Party (TC–PNC)	5,289	0.31	+0.14	0	±0
Regionalist Unity of Castile and León (URCL)	4,061	0.24	+0.07	0	±0
Salamanca–Zamora–León–PREPAL (PREPAL)	1,947	0.12	+0.05	0	±0
Humanist Party (PH)	1,438	0.09	+0.05	0	±0
Workers' Revolutionary Party (PRT)	1,346	0.08	New	0	±0
Authentic Spanish Phalanx (FEA)	1,339	0.08	New	0	±0
The European Greens (LVE)	1,109	0.07	−0.54	0	±0
Party of El Bierzo (PB)	1,000	0.06	−0.06	0	±0
The Greens–Green Group (LV–GV)	840	0.05	New	0	±0
Communist Party of the Peoples of Spain (PCPE)	493	0.03	+0.02	0	±0
Inter-Zamoran Party (PIZ)	215	0.01	New	0	±0
Republican Coalition (CR)^{1}	56	0.00	−0.04	0	±0
Blank ballots	22,683	1.35	+0.18		
Total	1,683,747			33	±0
Valid votes	1,683,747	99.38	+0.13		
Invalid votes	10,561	0.62	−0.13		
Votes cast / turnout	1,694,308	79.01	+0.74		
Abstentions	450,054	20.99	−0.74		
Registered voters	2,144,362				
Sources
Footnotes: ^{1} Republican Coalition results are compared to Coalition for a New Socialist Party totals in the 1993 election.

=== Castilla–La Mancha ===
← Summary of the 3 March 1996 Congress of Deputies election results in Castilla–La Mancha →
Parties and alliances	Popular vote			Seats	
Parties and alliances	Votes	%	±pp	Total	+/−
People's Party (PP)	534,983	47.18	+4.15	11	+1
Spanish Socialist Workers' Party (PSOE)	483,251	42.62	−2.68	9	−1
United Left–Left of Castilla–La Mancha (IU–ICAM)	95,199	8.40	+0.79	0	±0
Centrist Union (UC)	3,424	0.30	−1.73	0	±0
Regionalist Party of Castilla–La Mancha (PRCM)	2,279	0.20	New	0	±0
Humanist Party (PH)	1,014	0.09	+0.05	0	±0
Commoners' Land–Castilian Nationalist Party (TC–PNC)	917	0.08	−0.01	0	±0
Workers' Revolutionary Party (PRT)	829	0.07	New	0	±0
Authentic Spanish Phalanx (FEA)	694	0.06	New	0	±0
Red–Green Party (PRV)	680	0.06	New	0	±0
Regionalist Party of Guadalajara (PRGU)	338	0.03	+0.01	0	±0
Blank ballots	10,256	0.90	+0.13		
Total	1,133,864			20	±0
Valid votes	1,133,864	99.37	−0.01		
Invalid votes	7,185	0.63	+0.01		
Votes cast / turnout	1,141,049	83.09	+0.96		
Abstentions	232,263	16.91	−0.96		
Registered voters	1,373,312				

=== Catalonia ===
← Summary of the 3 March 1996 Congress of Deputies election results in Catalonia →
Parties and alliances	Popular vote			Seats	
Parties and alliances	Votes	%	±pp	Total	+/−
Socialists' Party of Catalonia (PSC–PSOE)	1,531,143	39.36	+4.49	19	+1
Convergence and Union (CiU)	1,151,633	29.61	−2.21	16	−1
People's Party (PP)	698,400	17.96	+0.92	8	±0
Initiative for Catalonia–The Greens (IC–EV)	296,985	7.64	+0.18	2	−1
Republican Left of Catalonia (ERC)	162,545	4.18	−0.92	1	±0
The European Greens–Ecologist Alternative of Catalonia (EVE–AEC)^{1}	7,828	0.20	−0.80	0	±0
Ecologist Party of Catalonia (PEC)	4,305	0.11	−0.14	0	±0
Centrist Union (UC)	2,752	0.07	−0.68	0	±0
Workers' Revolutionary Party (PRT)^{2}	2,642	0.07	−0.19	0	±0
Authentic Spanish Phalanx (FEA)	1,633	0.04	+0.02	0	±0
Humanist Party (PH)	1,527	0.04	±0.00	0	±0
Citizen Independent Platform of Catalonia (PICC)	1,229	0.03	New	0	±0
Republican Coalition (CR)^{3}	655	0.02	−0.01	0	±0
European Nation State (N)	495	0.01	New	0	±0
Revolutionary Workers' Party (POR)	0	0.00	−0.09	0	±0
Blank ballots	25,857	0.66	±0.00		
Total	3,889,629			46	−1
Valid votes	3,889,629	99.67	+0.08		
Invalid votes	12,918	0.33	−0.08		
Votes cast / turnout	3,902,547	76.52	+1.15		
Abstentions	1,197,184	23.48	−1.15		
Registered voters	5,099,731				
Sources
Footnotes: ^{1} The European Greens–Ecologist Alternative of Catalonia results are compared to The Greens–Ecologist Confederation of Catalonia totals in the 1993 election.; ^{2} Workers' Revolutionary Party results are compared to Workers' Socialist Party totals in the 1993 election.; ^{3} Republican Coalition results are compared to Coalition for a New Socialist Party totals in the 1993 election.

=== Extremadura ===
← Summary of the 3 March 1996 Congress of Deputies election results in Extremadura →
Parties and alliances	Popular vote			Seats	
Parties and alliances	Votes	%	±pp	Total	+/−
Spanish Socialist Workers' Party (PSOE)	339,903	48.43	−3.07	6	−1
People's Party (PP)	282,698	40.28	+4.51	5	+1
United Left–The Greens–Commitment for Extremadura (IU–LV–CE)	62,502	8.90	+1.06	0	±0
Extremaduran Coalition (CEx)^{1}	7,312	1.04	−0.31	0	±0
Independent Socialists of Extremadura (SIEx)	1,678	0.24	New	0	±0
Centrist Union (UC)	1,007	0.14	−1.90	0	±0
Communist Party of the Peoples of Spain (PCPE)	584	0.08	New	0	±0
Workers' Revolutionary Party (PRT)	481	0.07	New	0	±0
Independent Spanish Phalanx (FEI)	199	0.03	New	0	±0
Authentic Spanish Phalanx (FEA)	174	0.02	New	0	±0
Humanist Party (PH)	140	0.02	±0.00	0	±0
Republican Coalition (CR)^{2}	124	0.02	−0.02	0	±0
Blank ballots	5,081	0.72	+0.18		
Total	701,883			11	±0
Valid votes	701,883	99.57	+0.05		
Invalid votes	3,022	0.43	−0.05		
Votes cast / turnout	704,905	82.33	+1.87		
Abstentions	151,293	17.67	−1.87		
Registered voters	856,198				
Sources
Footnotes: ^{1} Extremaduran Coalition results are compared to the combined totals of United Extremadura and Extremaduran Regionalist Party in the 1993 election.; ^{2} Republican Coalition results are compared to Coalition for a New Socialist Party totals in the 1993 election.

=== Galicia ===
← Summary of the 3 March 1996 Congress of Deputies election results in Galicia →
Parties and alliances	Popular vote			Seats	
Parties and alliances	Votes	%	±pp	Total	+/−
People's Party (PP)	827,405	48.31	+1.19	14	−1
Socialists' Party of Galicia (PSdeG–PSOE)	574,491	33.54	−2.41	9	−2
Galician Nationalist Bloc (BNG)	220,147	12.85	+4.84	2	+2
United Left–Galician Left (EU–EG)	62,253	3.63	−1.08	0	±0
The European Greens–The Greens of Galicia (VE–VG)	6,596	0.39	+0.05	0	±0
Centrist Union (UC)	2,613	0.15	−1.38	0	±0
Galician People's Front (FPG)	2,065	0.12	New	0	±0
Humanist Party (PH)	1,444	0.08	+0.03	0	±0
Authentic Spanish Phalanx (FEA)	121	0.01	New	0	±0
Blank ballots	15,683	0.92	+0.05		
Total	1,712,818			25	−1
Valid votes	1,712,818	99.35	+0.08		
Invalid votes	11,161	0.65	−0.08		
Votes cast / turnout	1,723,979	71.40	+1.76		
Abstentions	690,684	28.60	−1.76		
Registered voters	2,414,663				

=== La Rioja ===
← Summary of the 3 March 1996 Congress of Deputies election results in La Rioja →
Parties and alliances	Popular vote			Seats	
Parties and alliances	Votes	%	±pp	Total	+/−
People's Party (PP)	88,069	49.41	+3.15	2	±0
Spanish Socialist Workers' Party (PSOE)	65,311	36.65	−0.95	2	±0
United Left–La Rioja (IU)	15,530	8.71	+1.75	0	±0
Riojan Party (PR)	6,065	3.40	−1.02	0	±0
Centrist Union (UC)	472	0.26	−1.86	0	±0
Authentic Spanish Phalanx (FEA)	167	0.09	New	0	±0
Blank ballots	2,612	1.47	+0.22		
Total	178,226			4	±0
Valid votes	178,226	99.40	−0.04		
Invalid votes	1,080	0.60	+0.04		
Votes cast / turnout	179,306	80.92	+0.92		
Abstentions	42,277	19.08	−0.92		
Registered voters	221,583				

=== Madrid ===
← Summary of the 3 March 1996 Congress of Deputies election results in Madrid →
Parties and alliances	Popular vote			Seats	
Parties and alliances	Votes	%	±pp	Total	+/−
People's Party (PP)	1,642,489	49.29	+5.37	17	+1
Spanish Socialist Workers' Party (PSOE)	1,046,904	31.42	−3.54	11	−2
United Left (IU)	547,901	16.44	+1.86	6	+1
The Greens–Green Group (LV–GV)	12,975	0.39	New	0	±0
Centrist Union (UC)	12,220	0.37	−2.62	0	±0
The Greens of Madrid (LVM)	8,483	0.25	New	0	±0
The European Greens–The Alternative Greens (LVE)	5,492	0.16	−0.91	0	±0
Alliance for National Unity (AUN)	1,907	0.06	New	0	±0
Madrilenian Independent Regional Party (PRIM)	1,671	0.05	−0.01	0	±0
Communist Party of the Peoples of Spain (PCPE)	1,588	0.05	New	0	±0
Humanist Party (PH)	1,495	0.04	+0.01	0	±0
Workers' Revolutionary Party (PRT)^{1}	1,339	0.04	−0.11	0	±0
Authentic Spanish Phalanx (FEA)	1,031	0.03	New	0	±0
Red–Green Party (PRV)	976	0.03	New	0	±0
Independent Spanish Phalanx (FEI)	867	0.03	−0.01	0	±0
Regionalist Party of the Leonese Country (PREPAL)	815	0.02	New	0	±0
Republican Coalition (CR)^{2}	712	0.02	±0.00	0	±0
Republican Action (AR)	656	0.02	−0.02	0	±0
Citizen Democratic Action (ADEC)	598	0.00	New	0	±0
Party of Self-employed of Spain (PAE)	0	0.00	New	0	±0
Revolutionary Workers' Party (POR)	0	0.00	−0.04	0	±0
Blank ballots	41,927	1.26	+0.28		
Total	3,332,046			34	±0
Valid votes	3,332,046	99.68	+0.07		
Invalid votes	10,582	0.32	−0.07		
Votes cast / turnout	3,342,628	79.59	+0.67		
Abstentions	857,171	20.41	−0.67		
Registered voters	4,199,799				
Sources
Footnotes: ^{1} Workers' Revolutionary Party results are compared to Workers' Socialist Party totals in the 1993 election.; ^{2} Republican Coalition results are compared to Coalition for a New Socialist Party totals in the 1993 election.

=== Murcia ===
← Summary of the 3 March 1996 Congress of Deputies election results in Murcia →
Parties and alliances	Popular vote			Seats	
Parties and alliances	Votes	%	±pp	Total	+/−
People's Party (PP)	350,337	49.89	+2.60	5	+1
Spanish Socialist Workers' Party (PSOE)	266,738	37.99	−0.60	3	−1
United Left–The Greens Region of Murcia (IU–LV)	73,961	10.53	+0.82	1	±0
Centrist Union (UC)	1,916	0.27	−1.93	0	±0
New Region (NR)	1,452	0.21	New	0	±0
Workers' Revolutionary Party (PRT)	892	0.13	New	0	±0
Alliance for National Unity (AUN)	711	0.10	New	0	±0
Authentic Spanish Phalanx (FEA)	669	0.10	New	0	±0
Blank ballots	5,516	0.79	+0.27		
Total	702,192			9	±0
Valid votes	702,192	99.54	+0.06		
Invalid votes	3,251	0.46	−0.06		
Votes cast / turnout	705,443	82.00	+0.44		
Abstentions	154,862	18.00	−0.44		
Registered voters	860,305				

=== Navarre ===
← Summary of the 3 March 1996 Congress of Deputies election results in Navarre →
Parties and alliances	Popular vote			Seats	
Parties and alliances	Votes	%	±pp	Total	+/−
Navarrese People's Union–People's Party (UPN–PP)	120,335	37.12	+0.99	2	−1
Spanish Socialist Workers' Party (PSOE)	98,102	30.26	−4.61	2	±0
United Left of Navarre (IU/EB)	40,354	12.45	+3.74	1	+1
Popular Unity (HB)	26,451	8.16	−2.21	0	±0
Convergence of Democrats of Navarre (CDN)	17,020	5.25	New	0	±0
Basque Solidarity (EA)	12,233	3.77	+0.09	0	±0
Basque Nationalist Party (EAJ/PNV)	3,158	0.97	−0.17	0	±0
Workers' Revolutionary Party (PRT)	501	0.15	New	0	±0
Centrist Union (UC)	356	0.11	−1.58	0	±0
Authentic Spanish Phalanx (FEA)	196	0.06	New	0	±0
Blank ballots	5,480	1.69	+0.24		
Total	324,186			5	±0
Valid votes	324,186	99.38	+0.14		
Invalid votes	2,015	0.62	−0.14		
Votes cast / turnout	326,201	73.45	−0.13		
Abstentions	117,893	26.55	+0.13		
Registered voters	444,094				

=== Valencian Community ===
← Summary of the 3 March 1996 Congress of Deputies election results in the Valencian Community →
Parties and alliances	Popular vote			Seats	
Parties and alliances	Votes	%	±pp	Total	+/−
People's Party (PP)	1,130,813	43.73	+3.25	15	±0
Spanish Socialist Workers' Party (PSOE)	990,993	38.32	−0.03	13	+1
United Left of the Valencian Country (EUPV)	286,582	11.08	+0.55	3	±0
Valencian Union (UV)	91,575	3.54	−1.07	1	±0
Valencian People's Union–Nationalist Bloc (UPV–BN)	26,777	1.04	−0.64	0	±0
The Greens of the Valencian Country (EV)	20,402	0.79	−0.15	0	±0
Communist Party of the Peoples of Spain (PCPE)	3,906	0.15	+0.07	0	±0
Centrist Union (UC)	3,382	0.13	−1.51	0	±0
Republican Left of Catalonia (ERC)	3,294	0.13	New	0	±0
Authentic Spanish Phalanx (FEA)	1,602	0.06	New	0	±0
Workers' Revolutionary Party (PRT)^{1}	1,122	0.04	−0.03	0	±0
Valencian Nationalist Left (ENV)	1,023	0.04	−0.02	0	±0
Humanist Party (PH)	1,000	0.04	+0.01	0	±0
Alicantine Provincial Union (UPRA)	651	0.03	±0.00	0	±0
Republican Coalition (CR)^{2}	482	0.02	−0.01	0	±0
Alliance for National Unity (AUN)	428	0.02	New	0	±0
Social and Autonomist Liberal Group (ALAS)	402	0.02	New	0	±0
Republican Action (AR)	324	0.01	−0.06	0	±0
Spanish Autonomous League (LAE)	296	0.01	New	0	±0
Centrists of the Valencian Community (CCV)	0	0.00	New	0	±0
Blank ballots	20,731	0.80	+0.22		
Total	2,585,785			32	+1
Valid votes	2,585,785	99.49	+0.04		
Invalid votes	13,328	0.51	−0.04		
Votes cast / turnout	2,599,113	81.66	−0.05		
Abstentions	583,711	18.34	+0.05		
Registered voters	3,182,824				
Sources
Footnotes: ^{1} Workers' Revolutionary Party results are compared to Workers' Socialist Party totals in the 1993 election.; ^{2} Republican Coalition results are compared to Coalition for a New Socialist Party totals in the 1993 election.

== Autonomous cities ==
=== Ceuta ===
← Summary of the 3 March 1996 Congress of Deputies election results in Ceuta →
Parties and alliances	Popular vote			Seats	
Parties and alliances	Votes	%	±pp	Total	+/−
People's Party (PP)	17,288	53.21	+2.28	1	±0
Spanish Socialist Workers' Party (PSOE)	11,627	35.79	−4.79	0	±0
Socialist Party of the People of Ceuta (PSPC)	2,365	7.28	+3.43	0	±0
United Left (IU)	718	2.21	New	0	±0
Workers' Revolutionary Party (PRT)^{1}	56	0.17	−0.16	0	±0
Humanist Party (PH)	41	0.13	New	0	±0
Blank ballots	395	1.22	+0.45		
Total	32,490			1	±0
Valid votes	32,490	99.26	−0.24		
Invalid votes	242	0.74	+0.24		
Votes cast / turnout	32,732	63.81	+1.68		
Abstentions	18,566	36.19	−1.68		
Registered voters	51,298				
Sources
Footnotes: ^{1} Workers' Revolutionary Party results are compared to Workers' Socialist Party totals in the 1993 election.

=== Melilla ===
← Summary of the 3 March 1996 Congress of Deputies election results in Melilla →
Parties and alliances	Popular vote			Seats	
Parties and alliances	Votes	%	±pp	Total	+/−
People's Party (PP)	13,788	50.57	+5.65	1	+1
Spanish Socialist Workers' Party (PSOE)	11,810	43.32	−5.47	0	−1
United Left (IU)	950	3.48	+0.88	0	±0
Nationalist Party of Melilla (PNM)	200	0.73	New	0	±0
Centrist Union (UC)	74	0.27	−1.88	0	±0
Blank ballots	441	1.62	+0.39		
Total	27,263			1	±0
Valid votes	27,263	99.09	−0.48		
Invalid votes	251	0.91	+0.48		
Votes cast / turnout	27,514	61.95	−4.19		
Abstentions	16,901	38.05	+4.19		
Registered voters	44,415				
