= Cáceres (Congress of Deputies constituency) =

Electoral constituency in Spain

Coordinates: 39°40′N 6°00′W

- Congress of Deputies; Electoral constituency
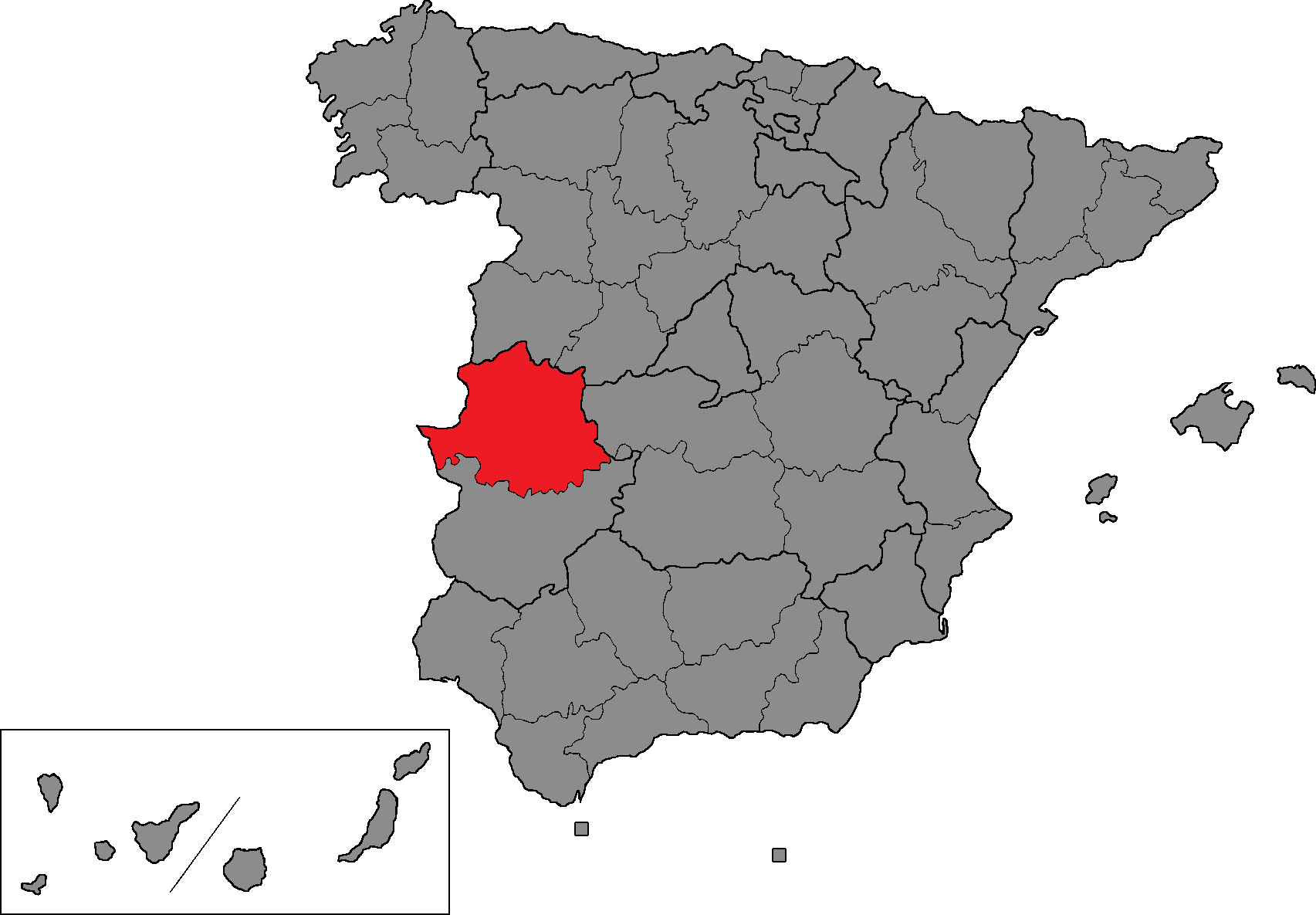
- Location of Cáceres within Spain
- Province: Cáceres
- Autonomous community: Extremadura
- Population: ▲387,820 (2024)
- Electorate: ▼339,491 (2023)
- Major settlements: Cáceres, Plasencia

Current constituency
- Created: 1977
- Seats: 5 (1977–2004); 4 (2004–present)
- Members: PSOE (2); PP (2)

Cáceres is one of the 52 constituencies represented in the Congress of Deputies, the lower chamber of the Spanish parliament, the Cortes Generales. The constituency (whose boundaries correspond to those of the homonymous province) currently elects four deputies. The electoral system uses the D'Hondt method and closed-list proportional voting, with a minimum threshold of three percent.

== Electoral system ==
The constituency was created as per the Political Reform Law and was first contested in the 1977 general election. The Law provided for the provinces of Spain to be established as multi-member districts in the Congress of Deputies, with this regulation being maintained under the Spanish Constitution of 1978. Additionally, the Constitution requires for any modification of the provincial limits to be approved under an organic law, needing an absolute majority in the Cortes Generales.

Voting is based on universal suffrage, comprising all Spanish nationals over 18 years of age with full political rights, provided that they have not been deprived of the right to vote by a final sentence. The only exception was in 1977, when this was limited to nationals over 21 years of age and in full enjoyment of their political and civil rights. Amendments in 2011 required non-resident citizens to apply for voting, a system known as "begged" voting (Spanish: Voto rogado). which was abolished in 2022. Further, amendments in 2018 granted the right to vote to those legally incapacitated. The Congress of Deputies has a minimum of 300 and a maximum of 400 seats, with electoral provisions fixing its size at 350. Of these, 348 are elected in 50 multi-member constituencies corresponding to the provinces of Spain—each of which is assigned an initial minimum of two seats and the remaining 248 distributed in proportion to population—using the D'Hondt method and closed-list proportional voting, with a three percent-threshold of valid votes (including blank ballots) in each constituency. The remaining two seats are allocated to Ceuta and Melilla as single-member districts elected by plurality voting. The use of this electoral method may result in a higher effective threshold depending on district magnitude and vote distribution. The law does not provide for by-elections to fill vacant seats; instead, any vacancies arising after the proclamation of candidates and during the legislative term are filled by the next candidates on the party lists or, when required, by designated substitutes.

The electoral law allows for parties and federations registered in the interior ministry, alliances and groupings of electors to present lists of candidates. Parties and federations intending to form an alliance are required to inform the relevant electoral commission within 10 days of the election call—15 before 1985—whereas groupings of electors need to secure the signature of at least one percent of the electorate in the constituencies for which they seek election—one permille of the electorate, with a compulsory minimum of 500 signatures, until 1985—disallowing electors from signing for more than one list. Also since 2011, parties, federations or alliances that have not obtained a mandate in either chamber of the Cortes at the preceding election are required to secure the signature of at least 0.1 percent of electors in the aforementioned constituencies. Amendments in 2007 required a balanced composition of men and women in the electoral lists, so that candidates of either sex made up at least 40 percent of the total composition; further amendments in 2024 required the use of a zipper system.

== Deputies ==
Deputies 1977–present
Key to parties PSOE Cs UCD PP CP AP Vox
Legislature	Election	Distribution
Constituent	1977	1 / 4
1st	1979	2 / 3
2nd	1982	4 / 1
3rd	1986	3 / 2
4th	1989	3 / 2
5th	1993	3 / 2
6th	1996	3 / 2
7th	2000	2 / 3
8th	2004	2 / 2
9th	2008	2 / 2
10th	2011	2 / 2
11th	2015	2 / 2
12th	2016	2 / 2
13th	2019 (Apr)	2 / 1 / 1
14th	2019 (Nov)	2 / 1 / 1
15th	2023	2 / 2

== General elections ==
=== 2026 ===
Summary of the 29 November 2026 Congress of Deputies election results in Cáceres
Parties and alliances	Popular vote			Seats	
Parties and alliances	Votes	%	±pp	Total	+/−
Spanish Socialist Workers' Party (PSOE)					
People's Party (PP)					
Vox (Vox)					
Broad Front (FA)^{1}			n/a		
We Can (Podemos)^{1}			n/a		
Workers' Front (FO)					
The Party is Over (SALF)			New		
Communist Party of the Workers of Spain (PCTE)			New		
New Extremennism–Forward Extremadura (NEx)			New		
Blank ballots					
Total				4	±0
Valid votes					
Invalid votes					
Votes cast / turnout					
Abstentions					
Registered voters	339,508				
Sources
Footnotes: ^{1} Within the Unite alliance in the 2023 election.

=== 2023 ===
Summary of the 23 July 2023 Congress of Deputies election results in Cáceres
Parties and alliances	Popular vote			Seats	
Parties and alliances	Votes	%	±pp	Total	+/−
Spanish Socialist Workers' Party (PSOE)	91,692	38.88	+0.75	2	±0
People's Party (PP)	89,633	38.00	+10.44	2	+1
Vox (Vox)	32,076	13.60	–2.44	0	–1
Unite (Sumar)^{1}	16,354	6.93	–2.07	0	±0
Extremaduran Bloc (BQEx)	1,922	0.81	New	0	±0
We Are Cáceres (Somos Cc)	963	0.41	New	0	±0
Animalist Party with the Environment (PACMA)^{2}	814	0.35	–0.22	0	±0
Workers' Front (FO)	316	0.13	New	0	±0
For a Fairer World (PUM+J)	249	0.11	–0.02	0	±0
Zero Cuts (Recortes Cero)	111	0.05	–0.10	0	±0
Blank ballots	1,721	0.73	–0.12		
Total	235,851			4	±0
Valid votes	275,851	98.37	+0.29		
Invalid votes	3,896	1.63	–0.29		
Votes cast / turnout	239,747	70.62	+4.54		
Abstentions	99,744	29.38	–4.54		
Registered voters	339,491				
Sources
Footnotes: ^{1} Unite results are compared to United We Can totals in the November 2019 election.; ^{2} Animalist Party with the Environment results are compared to Animalist Party Against Mistreatment of Animals totals in the November 2019 election.

=== November 2019 ===
Summary of the 10 November 2019 Congress of Deputies election results in Cáceres
Parties and alliances	Popular vote			Seats	
Parties and alliances	Votes	%	±pp	Total	+/−
Spanish Socialist Workers' Party (PSOE)	85,135	38.13	+0.73	2	±0
People's Party (PP)	61,527	27.56	+4.57	1	±0
Vox (Vox)	35,807	16.04	+5.63	1	+1
United We Can (Podemos–IU)	20,101	9.00	–0.77	0	±0
Citizens–Party of the Citizenry (Cs)	15,533	6.96	–10.11	0	–1
United Extremadura (EU)	1,347	0.60	New	0	±0
Animalist Party Against Mistreatment of Animals (PACMA)	1,276	0.57	–0.12	0	±0
Zero Cuts–Green Group (Recortes Cero–GV)	342	0.15	–0.01	0	±0
For a Fairer World (PUM+J)	295	0.13	New	0	±0
Blank ballots	1,894	0.85	+0.14		
Total	223,257			4	±0
Valid votes	223,257	98.08	–0.21		
Invalid votes	4,364	1.92	+0.21		
Votes cast / turnout	227,621	66.08	–7.24		
Abstentions	116,824	33.92	+7.24		
Registered voters	344,445				

=== April 2019 ===
Summary of the 28 April 2019 Congress of Deputies election results in Cáceres
Parties and alliances	Popular vote			Seats	
Parties and alliances	Votes	%	±pp	Total	+/−
Spanish Socialist Workers' Party (PSOE)	93,016	37.40	+4.05	2	±0
People's Party (PP)	57,195	22.99	–17.41	1	–1
Citizens–Party of the Citizenry (Cs)	42,452	17.07	+6.76	1	+1
Vox (Vox)	25,903	10.41	+10.24	0	±0
United We Can (Podemos–IU–Equo)	24,292	9.77	–4.27	0	±0
Animalist Party Against Mistreatment of Animals (PACMA)	1,724	0.69	–0.03	0	±0
Extremadurans (CEx–CREx–PREx)	1,230	0.49	New	0	±0
Act (PACT)	743	0.30	New	0	±0
Zero Cuts–Green Group (Recortes Cero–GV)	407	0.16	–0.03	0	±0
Blank ballots	1,770	0.71	+0.06		
Total	248,732			4	±0
Valid votes	248,732	98.29	–0.24		
Invalid votes	4,326	1.71	+0.24		
Votes cast / turnout	253,058	73.32	+4.64		
Abstentions	92,097	26.68	–4.64		
Registered voters	345,155				

=== 2016 ===
Summary of the 26 June 2016 Congress of Deputies election results in Cáceres
Parties and alliances	Popular vote			Seats	
Parties and alliances	Votes	%	±pp	Total	+/−
People's Party (PP)	95,419	40.40	+5.09	2	±0
Spanish Socialist Workers' Party (PSOE)	78,767	33.35	–0.69	2	±0
United We Can (Podemos–IU–Equo)^{1}	33,164	14.04	–2.82	0	±0
Citizens–Party of the Citizenry (C's)	24,343	10.31	–1.10	0	±0
Animalist Party Against Mistreatment of Animals (PACMA)	1,690	0.72	+0.17	0	±0
Zero Cuts–Green Group (Recortes Cero–GV)	459	0.19	+0.05	0	±0
Union, Progress and Democracy (UPyD)	415	0.18	–0.25	0	±0
Vox (Vox)	409	0.17	–0.04	0	±0
Blank ballots	1,539	0.65	+0.02		
Total	236,205			4	±0
Valid votes	236,205	98.53	–0.11		
Invalid votes	3,530	1.47	+0.11		
Votes cast / turnout	239,735	68.68	–3.23		
Abstentions	109,347	31.32	+3.23		
Registered voters	349,082				
Sources
Footnotes: ^{1} United We Can results are compared to the combined totals of We Can and United Left–Popular Unity in Common in the 2015 election.

=== 2015 ===
Summary of the 20 December 2015 Congress of Deputies election results in Cáceres
Parties and alliances	Popular vote			Seats	
Parties and alliances	Votes	%	±pp	Total	+/−
People's Party (PP)	87,924	35.31	–16.73	2	±0
Spanish Socialist Workers' Party (PSOE)	84,758	34.04	–2.51	2	±0
We Can (Podemos)	34,730	13.95	New	0	±0
Citizens–Party of the Citizenry (C's)	28,406	11.41	New	0	±0
United Left–Popular Unity in Common (IU–UPeC)	7,252	2.91	–2.37	0	±0
Animalist Party Against Mistreatment of Animals (PACMA)	1,363	0.55	+0.20	0	±0
Union, Progress and Democracy (UPyD)	1,074	0.43	–3.01	0	±0
United Extremadura–Extremadurans (EU–eX)^{1}	1,070	0.43	+0.23	0	±0
Vox (Vox)	518	0.21	New	0	±0
Zero Cuts–Green Group (Recortes Cero–GV)	338	0.14	New	0	±0
Blank ballots	1,559	0.63	–0.53		
Total	248,992			4	±0
Valid votes	248,992	98.64	+0.27		
Invalid votes	3,427	1.36	–0.27		
Votes cast / turnout	252,419	71.91	–1.42		
Abstentions	98,618	28.09	+1.42		
Registered voters	351,037				
Sources
Footnotes: ^{1} United Extremadura–Extremadurans results are compared to Convergence for Extremadura totals in the 2011 election.

=== 2011 ===
Summary of the 20 November 2011 Congress of Deputies election results in Cáceres
Parties and alliances	Popular vote			Seats	
Parties and alliances	Votes	%	±pp	Total	+/−
People's Party–United Extremadura (PP–EU)^{1}	132,169	52.04	+9.71	2	±0
Spanish Socialist Workers' Party (PSOE)	92,822	36.55	–15.66	2	±0
United Left–Greens–Independent Socialists: Plural Left (IU–V–SIEx)	13,422	5.28	+2.56	0	±0
Union, Progress and Democracy (UPyD)	8,739	3.44	+2.68	0	±0
Equo (Equo)	1,695	0.67	New	0	±0
Animalist Party Against Mistreatment of Animals (PACMA)	886	0.35	+0.21	0	±0
For a Fairer World (PUM+J)	544	0.21	+0.13	0	±0
Convergence for Extremadura (CEx)	516	0.20	New	0	±0
Communist Unification of Spain (UCE)	256	0.10	New	0	±0
Blank ballots	2,941	1.16	+0.33		
Total	253,990			4	±0
Valid votes	253,990	98.37	–0.86		
Invalid votes	4,209	1.63	+0.86		
Votes cast / turnout	258,199	73.33	–5.14		
Abstentions	93,898	26.67	+5.14		
Registered voters	352,097				
Sources
Footnotes: ^{1} People's Party–United Extremadura results are compared to the combined totals of the People's Party and United Extremadura in the 2008 election.

=== 2008 ===
Summary of the 9 March 2008 Congress of Deputies election results in Cáceres
Parties and alliances	Popular vote			Seats	
Parties and alliances	Votes	%	±pp	Total	+/−
Spanish Socialist Workers' Party (PSOE)	142,003	52.21	+1.68	2	±0
People's Party (PP)	113,819	41.85	–1.69	2	±0
United Left–Alternative (IU)	7,409	2.72	–0.06	0	±0
Union, Progress and Democracy (UPyD)	2,073	0.76	New	0	±0
United Extremadura (EU)	1,317	0.48	–0.40	0	±0
The Greens of Extremadura (LV)	911	0.33	–0.13	0	±0
Social Democratic Party (PSD)	427	0.16	New	0	±0
Anti-Bullfighting Party Against Mistreatment of Animals (PACMA)	371	0.14	New	0	±0
Citizens–Party of the Citizenry (C's)	233	0.09	New	0	±0
Citizens for Blank Votes (CenB)	225	0.08	–0.02	0	±0
For a Fairer World (PUM+J)	215	0.08	New	0	±0
Communist Party of the Peoples of Spain (PCPE)	188	0.07	–0.02	0	±0
Spanish Phalanx of the CNSO (FE de las JONS)	100	0.04	±0.00	0	±0
National Democracy (DN)	97	0.04	±0.00	0	±0
Family and Life Party (PFyV)	82	0.03	–0.03	0	±0
Humanist Party (PH)	78	0.03	–0.01	0	±0
Authentic Phalanx (FA)	67	0.02	–0.01	0	±0
National Alliance (AN)	51	0.02	New	0	±0
Spanish Alternative (AES)	28	0.01	New	0	±0
Carlist Traditionalist Communion (CTC)	26	0.01	New	0	±0
Blank ballots	2,245	0.83	–0.39		
Total	271,965			4	±0
Valid votes	271,965	99.23	±0.00		
Invalid votes	2,100	0.77	±0.00		
Votes cast / turnout	274,065	78.47	–0.71		
Abstentions	75,182	21.53	+0.71		
Registered voters	349,247				

=== 2004 ===
Summary of the 14 March 2004 Congress of Deputies election results in Cáceres
Parties and alliances	Popular vote			Seats	
Parties and alliances	Votes	%	±pp	Total	+/−
Spanish Socialist Workers' Party (PSOE)^{1}	137,654	50.53	+5.27	2	±0
People's Party (PP)	118,627	43.54	–4.22	2	–1
United Left–Independent Socialists of Extremadura (IU–SIEx)^{2}	7,569	2.78	–1.04	0	±0
United Extremadura (EU)	2,408	0.88	–0.30	0	±0
The Greens of Extremadura (LV)	1,247	0.46	–0.14	0	±0
Democratic and Social Centre (CDS)	304	0.11	+0.03	0	±0
Citizens for Blank Votes (CenB)	273	0.10	New	0	±0
Communist Party of the Peoples of Spain (PCPE)	255	0.09	New	0	±0
Family and Life Party (PFyV)	150	0.06	New	0	±0
Republican Left (IR)	120	0.04	New	0	±0
Humanist Party (PH)	114	0.04	New	0	±0
National Democracy (DN)	110	0.04	New	0	±0
Spanish Phalanx of the CNSO (FE de las JONS)	109	0.04	New	0	±0
Authentic Phalanx (FA)	83	0.03	New	0	±0
The Phalanx (FE)	52	0.02	–0.07	0	±0
Republican Social Movement (MSR)	40	0.01	New	0	±0
Blank ballots	3,311	1.22	+0.14		
Total	272,426			4	–1
Valid votes	272,426	99.23	+0.02		
Invalid votes	2,123	0.77	–0.02		
Votes cast / turnout	274,549	79.18	+3.41		
Abstentions	72,211	20.82	–3.41		
Registered voters	346,760				
Sources
Footnotes: ^{1} Spanish Socialist Workers' Party results are compared to the combined totals of Spanish Socialist Workers' Party–Progressives and Extremaduran Coalition in the 2000 election.; ^{2} United Left–Independent Socialists of Extremadura results are compared to the combined totals of United Left and Independent Socialists of Extremadura in the 2000 election.

=== 2000 ===
Summary of the 12 March 2000 Congress of Deputies election results in Cáceres
Parties and alliances	Popular vote			Seats	
Parties and alliances	Votes	%	±pp	Total	+/−
People's Party (PP)	123,577	47.76	+5.75	3	+1
Spanish Socialist Workers' Party–Progressives (PSOE–p)	115,435	44.62	–3.28	2	–1
United Left (IU)	9,463	3.66	–3.64	0	±0
United Extremadura (EU)	3,048	1.18	New	0	±0
Extremaduran Coalition (PREx–CREx)	1,648	0.64	–0.79	0	±0
The Greens of Extremadura (LV)	1,543	0.60	New	0	±0
Independent Socialists of Extremadura (SIEx)	418	0.16	–0.06	0	±0
The Phalanx (FE)	223	0.09	New	0	±0
Centrist Union–Democratic and Social Centre (UC–CDS)	217	0.08	–0.10	0	±0
Natural Law Party (PLN)	169	0.07	New	0	±0
Spanish Democratic Party (PADE)	102	0.04	New	0	±0
Spain 2000 Platform (ES2000)	81	0.03	New	0	±0
Blank ballots	2,795	1.08	+0.35		
Total	258,719			5	±0
Valid votes	258,719	99.21	–0.31		
Invalid votes	2,066	0.79	+0.31		
Votes cast / turnout	260,785	75.77	–5.47		
Abstentions	83,407	24.23	+5.47		
Registered voters	344,192				

=== 1996 ===
Summary of the 3 March 1996 Congress of Deputies election results in Cáceres
Parties and alliances	Popular vote			Seats	
Parties and alliances	Votes	%	±pp	Total	+/−
Spanish Socialist Workers' Party (PSOE)	131,616	47.90	–2.91	3	±0
People's Party (PP)	115,444	42.01	+5.16	2	±0
United Left–The Greens–Commitment for Extremadura (IU–LV–CE)	20,068	7.30	+1.26	0	±0
Extremaduran Coalition (CEx)^{1}	3,923	1.43	–1.03	0	±0
Independent Socialists of Extremadura (SIEx)	605	0.22	New	0	±0
Centrist Union (UC)	505	0.18	–2.11	0	±0
Workers' Revolutionary Party (PRT)	193	0.07	New	0	±0
Authentic Spanish Phalanx (FEA)	174	0.06	New	0	±0
Humanist Party (PH)	140	0.05	New	0	±0
Republican Coalition (CR)	124	0.05	New	0	±0
Blank ballots	2,000	0.73	+0.19		
Total	274,792			5	±0
Valid votes	274,792	99.52	±0.00		
Invalid votes	1,328	0.48	±0.00		
Votes cast / turnout	276,120	81.24	+2.05		
Abstentions	63,781	18.76	–2.05		
Registered voters	339,901				
Sources
Footnotes: ^{1} Extremaduran Coalition results are compared to the combined totals of United Extremadura and Extremaduran Regionalist Party in the 1993 election.

=== 1993 ===
Summary of the 6 June 1993 Congress of Deputies election results in Cáceres
Parties and alliances	Popular vote			Seats	
Parties and alliances	Votes	%	±pp	Total	+/−
Spanish Socialist Workers' Party (PSOE)	131,853	50.81	–1.74	3	±0
People's Party (PP)	95,628	36.85	+9.65	2	±0
United Left of Extremadura (IU)	15,662	6.04	+0.96	0	±0
Democratic and Social Centre (CDS)	5,941	2.29	–6.54	0	±0
United Extremadura (EU)	4,778	1.84	–1.31	0	±0
Extremaduran Regionalist Party (PREx)	1,603	0.62	New	0	±0
The Greens (LV)^{1}	1,391	0.54	–0.15	0	±0
The Ecologists (LE)	786	0.30	–0.11	0	±0
Ruiz-Mateos Group (ARM)	305	0.12	–0.34	0	±0
Natural Law Party (PLN)	129	0.05	New	0	±0
Communist Unification of Spain (UCE)	0	0.00	New	0	±0
Blank ballots	1,403	0.54	+0.09		
Total	259,483			5	±0
Valid votes	259,483	99.52	+0.39		
Invalid votes	1,255	0.48	–0.39		
Votes cast / turnout	260,738	79.19	+4.48		
Abstentions	68,522	20.81	–4.48		
Registered voters	329,260				
Sources
Footnotes: ^{1} The Greens results are compared to The Greens–Green List totals in the 1989 election.

=== 1989 ===
Summary of the 29 October 1989 Congress of Deputies election results in Cáceres
Parties and alliances	Popular vote			Seats	
Parties and alliances	Votes	%	±pp	Total	+/−
Spanish Socialist Workers' Party (PSOE)	126,396	52.55	–1.20	3	±0
People's Party (PP)^{1}	65,430	27.20	–0.50	2	±0
Democratic and Social Centre (CDS)	21,228	8.83	+1.50	0	±0
United Left (IU)	12,226	5.08	+3.05	0	±0
United Extremadura (EU)	7,578	3.15	–2.13	0	±0
The Greens–Green List (LV–LV)	1,652	0.69	New	0	±0
Workers' Socialist Party (PST)	1,200	0.50	New	0	±0
Ruiz-Mateos Group (Ruiz-Mateos)	1,117	0.46	New	0	±0
The Ecologist Greens (LVE)	976	0.41	New	0	±0
Workers' Party of Spain–Communist Unity (PTE–UC)^{2}	744	0.31	–0.61	0	±0
Communist Party of the Peoples of Spain (PCPE)	380	0.16	New	0	±0
Spanish Phalanx of the CNSO (FE–JONS)	255	0.11	–0.13	0	±0
Humanist Party (PH)	130	0.05	New	0	±0
Alliance for the Republic (AxR)^{3}	111	0.05	–0.22	0	±0
Blank ballots	1,086	0.45	–0.05		
Total	240,509			5	±0
Valid votes	240,509	99.13	+0.46		
Invalid votes	2,117	0.87	–0.46		
Votes cast / turnout	242,626	74.71	+2.45		
Abstentions	82,113	25.29	–2.45		
Registered voters	324,739				
Sources
Footnotes: ^{1} People's Party results are compared to People's Coalition totals in the 1986 election.; ^{2} Workers' Party of Spain–Communist Unity results are compared to Communists' Unity Board totals in the 1986 election.; ^{3} Alliance for the Republic results are compared to Internationalist Socialist Workers' Party totals in the 1986 election.

=== 1986 ===
Summary of the 22 June 1986 Congress of Deputies election results in Cáceres
Parties and alliances	Popular vote			Seats	
Parties and alliances	Votes	%	±pp	Total	+/−
Spanish Socialist Workers' Party (PSOE)	127,040	53.75	+1.22	3	–1
People's Coalition (AP–PDP–PL)^{1}	65,470	27.70	+3.22	2	+1
Democratic and Social Centre (CDS)	17,324	7.33	+5.41	0	±0
United Extremadura (EU)	12,483	5.28	+0.20	0	±0
United Left (IU)^{2}	4,796	2.03	+0.41	0	±0
Democratic Reformist Party (PRD)	3,736	1.58	New	0	±0
Communists' Unity Board (MUC)	2,166	0.92	New	0	±0
Internationalist Socialist Workers' Party (POSI)	638	0.27	New	0	±0
Spanish Phalanx of the CNSO (FE–JONS)	572	0.24	+0.24	0	±0
Communist Unification of Spain (UCE)	551	0.23	+0.12	0	±0
Republican Popular Unity (UPR)	381	0.16	New	0	±0
Party of the Communists of Catalonia (PCC)	2	0.00	New	0	±0
Blank ballots	1,173	0.50	+0.18		
Total	236,332			5	±0
Valid votes	236,332	98.67	+0.77		
Invalid votes	3,197	1.33	–0.77		
Votes cast / turnout	239,529	72.26	–6.56		
Abstentions	91,951	27.74	+6.56		
Registered voters	331,480				
Sources
Footnotes: ^{1} People's Coalition results are compared to People's Alliance–People's Democratic Party totals in the 1982 election.; ^{2} United Left results are compared to Communist Party of Spain totals in the 1982 election.

=== 1982 ===
Summary of the 28 October 1982 Congress of Deputies election results in Cáceres
Parties and alliances	Popular vote			Seats	
Parties and alliances	Votes	%	±pp	Total	+/−
Spanish Socialist Workers' Party (PSOE)	123,902	52.53	+14.53	4	+2
People's Alliance–People's Democratic Party (AP–PDP)^{1}	57,736	24.48	+20.38	1	+1
Union of the Democratic Centre (UCD)	29,832	12.65	–34.49	0	–3
United Extremadura (EU)	11,988	5.08	New	0	±0
Democratic and Social Centre (CDS)	4,528	1.92	New	0	±0
Communist Party of Spain (PCE)	3,831	1.62	–3.59	0	±0
Workers' Socialist Party (PST)	1,595	0.68	New	0	±0
New Force (FN)^{2}	785	0.33	–2.40	0	±0
Communist Unification of Spain (UCE)	263	0.11	New	0	±0
Communist Unity Candidacy (CUC)	258	0.11	New	0	±0
Falangist Movement of Spain (MFE)	212	0.09	New	0	±0
Proverist Party (PPr)	168	0.07	New	0	±0
Spanish Phalanx of the CNSO (FE–JONS)	4	0.00	New	0	±0
Communist Movement of Extremadura (MCE)	2	0.00	–0.47	0	±0
Blank ballots	764	0.32	+0.10		
Total	235,868			5	±0
Valid votes	235,868	97.90	–0.80		
Invalid votes	5,068	2.10	+0.80		
Votes cast / turnout	240,936	78.82	+11.53		
Abstentions	64,736	21.18	–11.53		
Registered voters	305,672				
Sources
Footnotes: ^{1} People's Alliance–People's Democratic Party results are compared to Democratic Coalition totals in the 1979 election.; ^{2} New Force results are compared to National Union totals in the 1979 election.

=== 1979 ===
Summary of the 1 March 1979 Congress of Deputies election results in Cáceres
Parties and alliances	Popular vote			Seats	
Parties and alliances	Votes	%	±pp	Total	+/−
Union of the Democratic Centre (UCD)	97,592	47.14	–8.14	3	–1
Spanish Socialist Workers' Party (PSOE)^{1}	78,670	38.00	+9.79	2	+1
Communist Party of Spain (PCE)	10,777	5.21	+1.96	0	±0
Democratic Coalition (CD)^{2}	8,490	4.10	–5.22	0	±0
National Union (UN)	5,656	2.73	New	0	±0
Workers' Revolutionary Organization (ORT)^{3}	1,503	0.73	+0.73	0	±0
Party of Labour of Spain (PTE)	1,427	0.69	New	0	±0
Communist Movement–Organization of Communist Left (MC–OIC)	974	0.47	New	0	±0
Spanish Phalanx of the CNSO (Authentic) (FE–JONS(A))	746	0.36	–0.21	0	±0
Authentic Spanish Phalanx (FEA)	716	0.35	New	0	±0
Blank ballots	456	0.22	+0.05		
Total	207,007			5	±0
Valid votes	207,007	98.70	+0.16		
Invalid votes	2,728	1.30	–0.16		
Votes cast / turnout	209,735	67.29	–8.76		
Abstentions	101,946	32.71	+8.76		
Registered voters	311,681				
Sources
Footnotes: ^{1} Spanish Socialist Workers' Party results are compared to the combined totals of Spanish Socialist Workers' Party and People's Socialist Party–Socialist Unity in the 1977 election.; ^{2} Democratic Coalition results are compared to People's Alliance totals in the 1977 election.; ^{3} Workers' Revolutionary Organization results are compared to Workers' Electoral Group totals in the 1977 election.

=== 1977 ===
Summary of the 15 June 1977 Congress of Deputies election results in Cáceres
Parties and alliances	Popular vote			Seats	
Parties and alliances	Votes	%	±pp	Total	+/−
Union of the Democratic Centre (UCD)	115,729	55.28	n/a	4	n/a
Spanish Socialist Workers' Party (PSOE)	54,827	26.19	n/a	1	n/a
People's Alliance (AP)	19,516	9.32	n/a	0	n/a
Communist Party of Spain (PCE)	6,797	3.25	n/a	0	n/a
Spanish Social Reform (RSE)	4,481	2.14	n/a	0	n/a
People's Socialist Party–Socialist Unity (PSP–US)	4,229	2.02	n/a	0	n/a
Democratic Left Front (FDI)	2,229	1.06	n/a	0	n/a
Spanish Phalanx of the CNSO (Authentic) (FE–JONS(A))	1,193	0.57	n/a	0	n/a
Workers' Electoral Group (AET)	0	0.00	n/a	0	n/a
Blank ballots	362	0.17	n/a		
Total	209,363			5	n/a
Valid votes	209,363	98.54	n/a		
Invalid votes	3,098	1.46	n/a		
Votes cast / turnout	212,461	76.05	n/a		
Abstentions	66,911	23.95	n/a		
Registered voters	279,372				

== Bibliography ==
- Ley 1/1977, de 4 de enero, para la Reforma Política (Fundamental Law 1/1977). Official State Gazette (in Spanish). 4 January 1977. BOE-A-1977-165.
- Real Decreto-ley 20/1977, de 18 de marzo, sobre Normas Electorales (Royal Decree-Law 20/1977). Official State Gazette (in Spanish). 18 March 1977. BOE-A-1977-7445.
- Constitución Española (Constitution). Official State Gazette (in Spanish). 27 December 1978. BOE-A-1978-31229.
- Ley Orgánica 5/1985, de 19 de junio, del Régimen Electoral General (Organic Law 5/1985). Official State Gazette (in Spanish). 19 June 1985. BOE-A-1985-11672.
- Carreras de Odriozola, Albert; Tafunell Sambola, Xavier (2005) [1989]. Estadísticas históricas de España, siglos XIX-XX (PDF) (in Spanish). Vol. 1 (II ed.). Bilbao: Fundación BBVA. pp. 1072–1097. ISBN 84-96515-00-1. Archived from the original (PDF) on 24 September 2015.
