= La Rioja (Congress of Deputies constituency) =

Electoral constituency in Spain

Coordinates: 42°15′N 2°30′W

- Congress of Deputies; Electoral constituency
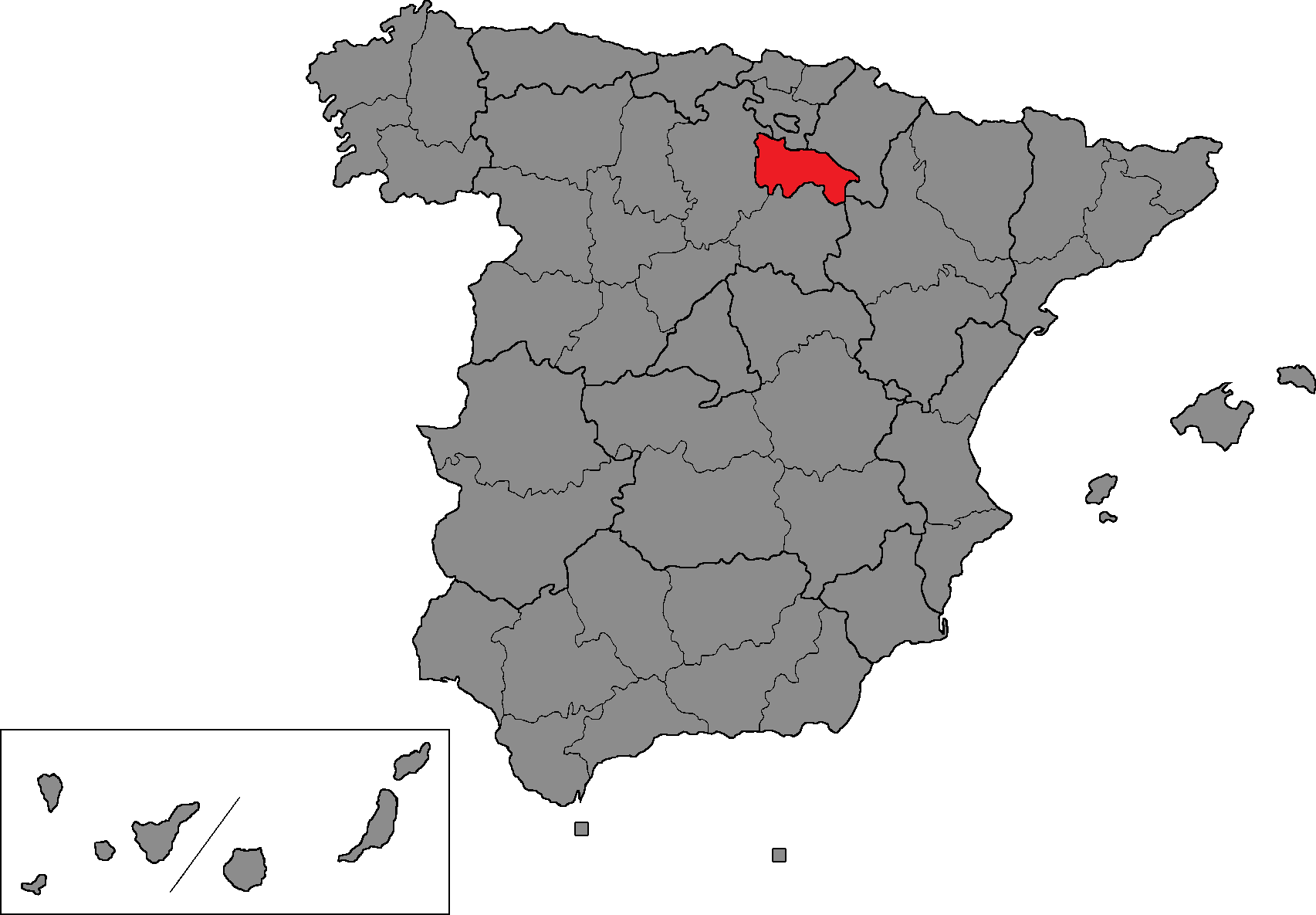
- Location of La Rioja within Spain
- Province: La Rioja
- Autonomous community: La Rioja
- Population: ▲324,399 (2024)
- Electorate: ▲252,091 (2023)
- Major settlements: Logroño

Current constituency
- Created: 1977
- Seats: 4
- Members: PP (2); PSOE (2)

La Rioja—Logroño until 1982—is one of the 52 constituencies represented in the Congress of Deputies, the lower chamber of the Spanish parliament, the Cortes Generales. The constituency (whose boundaries correspond to those of the homonymous province) currently elects four deputies. The electoral system uses the D'Hondt method and closed-list proportional voting, with a minimum threshold of three percent.

== Electoral system ==
The constituency was created as per the Political Reform Law and was first contested in the 1977 general election. The Law provided for the provinces of Spain to be established as multi-member districts in the Congress of Deputies, with this regulation being maintained under the Spanish Constitution of 1978. Additionally, the Constitution requires for any modification of the provincial limits to be approved under an organic law, needing an absolute majority in the Cortes Generales.

Voting is based on universal suffrage, comprising all Spanish nationals over 18 years of age with full political rights, provided that they have not been deprived of the right to vote by a final sentence. The only exception was in 1977, when this was limited to nationals over 21 years of age and in full enjoyment of their political and civil rights. Amendments in 2011 required non-resident citizens to apply for voting, a system known as "begged" voting (Spanish: Voto rogado). which was abolished in 2022. Further, amendments in 2018 granted the right to vote to those legally incapacitated. The Congress of Deputies has a minimum of 300 and a maximum of 400 seats, with electoral provisions fixing its size at 350. Of these, 348 are elected in 50 multi-member constituencies corresponding to the provinces of Spain—each of which is assigned an initial minimum of two seats and the remaining 248 distributed in proportion to population—using the D'Hondt method and closed-list proportional voting, with a three percent-threshold of valid votes (including blank ballots) in each constituency. The remaining two seats are allocated to Ceuta and Melilla as single-member districts elected by plurality voting. The use of this electoral method may result in a higher effective threshold depending on district magnitude and vote distribution. The law does not provide for by-elections to fill vacant seats; instead, any vacancies arising after the proclamation of candidates and during the legislative term are filled by the next candidates on the party lists or, when required, by designated substitutes.

The electoral law allows for parties and federations registered in the interior ministry, alliances and groupings of electors to present lists of candidates. Parties and federations intending to form an alliance are required to inform the relevant electoral commission within 10 days of the election call—15 before 1985—whereas groupings of electors need to secure the signature of at least one percent of the electorate in the constituencies for which they seek election—one permille of the electorate, with a compulsory minimum of 500 signatures, until 1985—disallowing electors from signing for more than one list. Also since 2011, parties, federations or alliances that have not obtained a mandate in either chamber of the Cortes at the preceding election are required to secure the signature of at least 0.1 percent of electors in the aforementioned constituencies. Amendments in 2007 required a balanced composition of men and women in the electoral lists, so that candidates of either sex made up at least 40 percent of the total composition; further amendments in 2024 required the use of a zipper system.

== Deputies ==
Deputies 1977–present
Key to parties U.Podemos Podemos PSOE Cs UCD PP CP AP
Legislature	Election	Distribution
Constituent	1977	1 / 2 / 1
1st	1979	1 / 3
2nd	1982	2 / 2
3rd	1986	2 / 2
4th	1989	2 / 2
5th	1993	2 / 2
6th	1996	2 / 2
7th	2000	1 / 3
8th	2004	2 / 2
9th	2008	2 / 2
10th	2011	1 / 3
11th	2015	1 / 1 / 2
12th	2016	1 / 1 / 2
13th	2019 (Apr)	2 / 1 / 1
14th	2019 (Nov)	2 / 2
15th	2023	2 / 2

== General elections ==
=== 2026 ===
Summary of the 29 November 2026 Congress of Deputies election results in La Rioja
Parties and alliances	Popular vote			Seats	
Parties and alliances	Votes	%	±pp	Total	+/−
People's Party (PP)					
Spanish Socialist Workers' Party (PSOE)					
Vox (Vox)					
Broad Front (FA)^{1}			n/a		
We Can (Podemos)^{1}			n/a		
Animalist Party with the Environment (PACMA)					
Blank Seats to Leave Empty Seats (EB)					
Workers' Front (FO)					
Communist Party of the Workers of Spain (PCTE)					
The Party is Over (SALF)			New		
Blank ballots					
Total				4	±0
Valid votes					
Invalid votes					
Votes cast / turnout					
Abstentions					
Registered voters	259,798				
Sources
Footnotes: ^{1} Within the Unite alliance in the 2023 election.

=== 2023 ===
Summary of the 23 July 2023 Congress of Deputies election results in La Rioja
Parties and alliances	Popular vote			Seats	
Parties and alliances	Votes	%	±pp	Total	+/−
People's Party (PP)	79,715	45.64	+11.41	2	±0
Spanish Socialist Workers' Party (PSOE)	62,322	35.68	+0.83	2	±0
Vox (Vox)	17,056	9.77	–1.69	0	±0
Unite (Sumar)^{1}	11,470	6.57	–3.30	0	±0
Animalist Party with the Environment (PACMA)^{2}	723	0.41	–0.25	0	±0
Blank Seats to Leave Empty Seats (EB)	608	0.35	+0.09	0	±0
Workers' Front (FO)	295	0.17	New	0	±0
Seniors in Action (3e)	286	0.16	New	0	±0
For a Fairer World (PUM+J)	232	0.13	–0.05	0	±0
Communist Party of the Workers of Spain (PCTE)	224	0.13	–0.03	0	±0
Zero Cuts (Recortes Cero)	124	0.07	–0.12	0	±0
Blank ballots	1,608	0.92	–0.15		
Total	174,663			4	±0
Valid votes	174,663	98.71	+0.27		
Invalid votes	2,282	1.29	–0.27		
Votes cast / turnout	176,945	70.19	+3.23		
Abstentions	75,146	29.81	–3.23		
Registered voters	252,091				
Sources
Footnotes: ^{1} Unite results are compared to United We Can totals in the November 2019 election.; ^{2} Animalist Party with the Environment results are compared to Animalist Party Against Mistreatment of Animals totals in the November 2019 election.

=== November 2019 ===
Summary of the 10 November 2019 Congress of Deputies election results in La Rioja
Parties and alliances	Popular vote			Seats	
Parties and alliances	Votes	%	±pp	Total	+/−
Spanish Socialist Workers' Party (PSOE)	57,485	34.85	+3.16	2	±0
People's Party (PP)	56,450	34.23	+7.72	2	+1
Vox (Vox)	18,908	11.46	+2.47	0	±0
United We Can (Podemos–IU)	16,273	9.87	–1.93	0	±0
Citizens–Party of the Citizenry (Cs)	11,673	7.08	–10.72	0	–1
Animalist Party Against Mistreatment of Animals (PACMA)	1,096	0.66	–0.11	0	±0
Blank Seats (EB)	425	0.26	+0.05	0	±0
Zero Cuts–Green Group (Recortes Cero–GV)	307	0.19	+0.04	0	±0
For a Fairer World (PUM+J)	297	0.18	+0.07	0	±0
Communist Party of the Workers of Spain (PCTE)	263	0.16	New	0	±0
Blank ballots	1,757	1.07	+0.26		
Total	164,934			4	±0
Valid votes	164,934	98.44	–0.19		
Invalid votes	2,615	1.56	+0.19		
Votes cast / turnout	167,549	66.96	–6.42		
Abstentions	82,664	33.04	+6.42		
Registered voters	250,213				

=== April 2019 ===
Summary of the 28 April 2019 Congress of Deputies election results in La Rioja
Parties and alliances	Popular vote			Seats	
Parties and alliances	Votes	%	±pp	Total	+/−
Spanish Socialist Workers' Party (PSOE)	57,307	31.69	+7.40	2	+1
People's Party (PP)	47,947	26.51	–16.10	1	–1
Citizens–Party of the Citizenry (Cs)	32,181	17.80	+3.82	1	+1
United We Can (Podemos–IU–Equo)	21,331	11.80	–4.83	0	–1
Vox (Vox)	16,255	8.99	+8.78	0	±0
Riojan Party (PR+)	2,098	1.16	New	0	±0
Animalist Party Against Mistreatment of Animals (PACMA)	1,394	0.77	–0.01	0	±0
Blank Seats (EB)	385	0.21	+0.03	0	±0
Zero Cuts–Green Group (Recortes Cero–GV)	275	0.15	–0.03	0	±0
For a Fairer World (PUM+J)	199	0.11	New	0	±0
Blank ballots	1,460	0.81	+0.10		
Total	180,832			4	±0
Valid votes	180,832	98.63	–0.27		
Invalid votes	2,512	1.37	+0.27		
Votes cast / turnout	183,344	73.38	+2.76		
Abstentions	66,495	26.62	–2.76		
Registered voters	249,839				

=== 2016 ===
Summary of the 26 June 2016 Congress of Deputies election results in La Rioja
Parties and alliances	Popular vote			Seats	
Parties and alliances	Votes	%	±pp	Total	+/−
People's Party (PP)	73,708	42.61	+4.27	2	±0
Spanish Socialist Workers' Party (PSOE)	42,010	24.29	+0.60	1	±0
United We Can (Podemos–IU–Equo)^{1}	28,772	16.63	–3.40	1	±0
Citizens–Party of the Citizenry (C's)	24,180	13.98	–1.15	0	±0
Animalist Party Against Mistreatment of Animals (PACMA)	1,350	0.78	+0.12	0	±0
Union, Progress and Democracy (UPyD)	425	0.25	–0.52	0	±0
Vox (Vox)	366	0.21	New	0	±0
Zero Cuts–Green Group (Recortes Cero–GV)	312	0.18	–0.02	0	±0
Blank Seats (EB)	304	0.18	–0.02	0	±0
Communist Party of the Peoples of Spain (PCPE)	250	0.14	+0.01	0	±0
Rioja Southern Territory–Navarrese Freedom (HRTS–Ln)	80	0.05	New	0	±0
Blank ballots	1,225	0.71	–0.13		
Total	172,982			4	±0
Valid votes	172,982	98.90	+0.05		
Invalid votes	1,931	1.10	–0.05		
Votes cast / turnout	174,913	70.62	–1.81		
Abstentions	72,757	29.38	+1.81		
Registered voters	247,670				
Sources
Footnotes: ^{1} United We Can results are compared to the combined totals of We Can and United Left–Popular Unity in Common in the 2015 election.

=== 2015 ===
Summary of the 20 December 2015 Congress of Deputies election results in La Rioja
Parties and alliances	Popular vote			Seats	
Parties and alliances	Votes	%	±pp	Total	+/−
People's Party (PP)	67,941	38.34	–16.36	2	–1
Spanish Socialist Workers' Party (PSOE)	41,973	23.69	–7.40	1	±0
We Can (Podemos)	28,073	15.84	New	1	+1
Citizens–Party of the Citizenry (C's)	26,812	15.13	New	0	±0
United Left–Popular Unity in Common (IU–UPeC)	7,423	4.19	–0.21	0	±0
Union, Progress and Democracy (UPyD)	1,361	0.77	–5.19	0	±0
Animalist Party Against Mistreatment of Animals (PACMA)	1,177	0.66	+0.21	0	±0
Blank Seats (EB)	362	0.20	–0.36	0	±0
Zero Cuts–Green Group (Recortes Cero–GV)	360	0.20	New	0	±0
Communist Party of the Peoples of Spain (PCPE)	229	0.13	–0.09	0	±0
Blank ballots	1,496	0.84	–0.77		
Total	177,207			4	±0
Valid votes	177,207	98.85	+0.43		
Invalid votes	2,062	1.15	–0.43		
Votes cast / turnout	179,269	72.43	–0.35		
Abstentions	68,238	27.57	+0.35		
Registered voters	247,507				

=== 2011 ===
Summary of the 20 November 2011 Congress of Deputies election results in La Rioja
Parties and alliances	Popular vote			Seats	
Parties and alliances	Votes	%	±pp	Total	+/−
People's Party (PP)	95,124	54.70	+5.19	3	+1
Spanish Socialist Workers' Party (PSOE)	54,066	31.09	–12.54	1	–1
Union, Progress and Democracy (UPyD)	10,367	5.96	+4.68	0	±0
United Left: Plural Left (IU)	7,995	4.60	+2.66	0	±0
Equo (Equo)	1,626	0.93	New	0	±0
Animalist Party Against Mistreatment of Animals (PACMA)	779	0.45	New	0	±0
For a Fairer World (PUM+J)	686	0.39	+0.27	0	±0
Communist Party of the Peoples of Spain (PCPE)	380	0.22	+0.14	0	±0
Communist Unification of Spain (UCE)	94	0.05	New	0	±0
Blank ballots	2,793	1.61	+0.51		
Total	173,910			4	±0
Valid votes	173,910	98.42	–0.88		
Invalid votes	2,797	1.58	+0.88		
Votes cast / turnout	176,707	72.78	–6.51		
Abstentions	66,093	27.22	+6.51		
Registered voters	242,800				

=== 2008 ===
Summary of the 9 March 2008 Congress of Deputies election results in La Rioja
Parties and alliances	Popular vote			Seats	
Parties and alliances	Votes	%	±pp	Total	+/−
People's Party (PP)	93,104	49.51	–0.43	2	±0
Spanish Socialist Workers' Party (PSOE)	82,032	43.63	–0.34	2	±0
United Left (IU)	3,647	1.94	–0.82	0	±0
Riojan Party (PR)	2,837	1.51	New	0	±0
Union, Progress and Democracy (UPyD)	2,405	1.28	New	0	±0
The Greens (Verdes)	853	0.45	New	0	±0
For a Fairer World (PUM+J)	221	0.12	New	0	±0
Social Democratic Party (PSD)	214	0.11	New	0	±0
Communist Party of the Peoples of Spain (PCPE)	150	0.08	New	0	±0
Citizens–Party of the Citizenry (C's)	102	0.05	New	0	±0
Family and Life Party (PFyV)	72	0.04	–0.19	0	±0
National Democracy (DN)	72	0.04	–0.03	0	±0
Spanish Alternative (AES)	61	0.03	New	0	±0
Spanish Phalanx of the CNSO (FE de las JONS)	60	0.03	New	0	±0
Humanist Party (PH)	48	0.03	New	0	±0
Authentic Phalanx (FA)	39	0.02	New	0	±0
Spain 2000 (E–2000)	37	0.02	New	0	±0
Carlist Party (PC)	11	0.01	–0.02	0	±0
Blank ballots	2,068	1.10	–0.97		
Total	188,033			4	±0
Valid votes	188,033	99.30	+0.08		
Invalid votes	1,328	0.70	–0.08		
Votes cast / turnout	189,361	79.29	–0.17		
Abstentions	49,447	20.71	+0.17		
Registered voters	238,808				

=== 2004 ===
Summary of the 14 March 2004 Congress of Deputies election results in La Rioja
Parties and alliances	Popular vote			Seats	
Parties and alliances	Votes	%	±pp	Total	+/−
People's Party (PP)	92,441	49.94	–4.16	2	–1
Spanish Socialist Workers' Party (PSOE)	81,390	43.97	+9.10	2	+1
United Left (IU)	5,115	2.76	–1.26	0	±0
Citizens for Blank Votes (CenB)	926	0.50	New	0	±0
Family and Life Party (PFyV)	434	0.23	New	0	±0
Democratic and Social Centre (CDS)	272	0.15	+0.07	0	±0
Republican Left (IR)	253	0.14	New	0	±0
The Phalanx (FE)	154	0.08	+0.02	0	±0
National Democracy (DN)	123	0.07	New	0	±0
Republican Social Movement (MSR)	101	0.05	New	0	±0
Carlist Party (PC)	63	0.03	±0.00	0	±0
Blank ballots	3,827	2.07	+0.15		
Total	185,099			4	±0
Valid votes	185,099	99.22	–0.02		
Invalid votes	1,446	0.78	+0.02		
Votes cast / turnout	186,545	79.46	+5.25		
Abstentions	48,231	20.54	–5.25		
Registered voters	234,776				

=== 2000 ===
Summary of the 12 March 2000 Congress of Deputies election results in La Rioja
Parties and alliances	Popular vote			Seats	
Parties and alliances	Votes	%	±pp	Total	+/−
People's Party (PP)	91,810	54.10	+4.69	3	+1
Spanish Socialist Workers' Party–Progressives (PSOE–p)	59,171	34.87	–1.78	1	–1
United Left (IU)	6,830	4.02	–4.69	0	±0
Riojan Party (PR)	6,155	3.63	+0.23	0	±0
The Greens (Verdes)	1,709	1.01	New	0	±0
Spanish Democratic Party (PADE)	139	0.08	New	0	±0
Centrist Union–Democratic and Social Centre (UC–CDS)	131	0.08	–0.18	0	±0
Movement for Humanist Socialism (MASH)	121	0.07	New	0	±0
The Phalanx (FE)	104	0.06	New	0	±0
Humanist Party (PH)	79	0.05	New	0	±0
Natural Law Party (PLN)	79	0.05	New	0	±0
Carlist Party (PC)	56	0.03	New	0	±0
Spain 2000 Platform (ES2000)	46	0.03	New	0	±0
Blank ballots	3,265	1.92	+0.45		
Total	169,695			4	±0
Valid votes	169,695	99.24	–0.16		
Invalid votes	1,302	0.76	+0.16		
Votes cast / turnout	170,997	74.21	–6.71		
Abstentions	59,430	25.79	+6.71		
Registered voters	230,427				

=== 1996 ===
Summary of the 3 March 1996 Congress of Deputies election results in La Rioja
Parties and alliances	Popular vote			Seats	
Parties and alliances	Votes	%	±pp	Total	+/−
People's Party (PP)	88,069	49.41	+3.15	2	±0
Spanish Socialist Workers' Party (PSOE)	65,311	36.65	–0.95	2	±0
United Left–La Rioja (IU)	15,530	8.71	+1.75	0	±0
Riojan Party (PR)	6,065	3.40	–1.02	0	±0
Centrist Union (UC)	472	0.26	–1.86	0	±0
Authentic Spanish Phalanx (FEA)	167	0.09	New	0	±0
Blank ballots	2,612	1.47	+0.22		
Total	178,226			4	±0
Valid votes	178,226	99.40	–0.04		
Invalid votes	1,080	0.60	+0.04		
Votes cast / turnout	179,306	80.92	+0.92		
Abstentions	42,277	19.08	–0.92		
Registered voters	221,583				

=== 1993 ===
Summary of the 6 June 1993 Congress of Deputies election results in La Rioja
Parties and alliances	Popular vote			Seats	
Parties and alliances	Votes	%	±pp	Total	+/−
People's Party (PP)	78,792	46.26	+5.17	2	±0
Spanish Socialist Workers' Party (PSOE)	64,037	37.60	–2.10	2	±0
United Left–La Rioja (IU)	11,850	6.96	+0.54	0	±0
Riojan Party (PR)	7,532	4.42	New	0	±0
Democratic and Social Centre (CDS)	3,609	2.12	–5.06	0	±0
The Greens (Verdes)	996	0.58	New	0	±0
The Ecologists (LE)	493	0.29	–0.99	0	±0
Ruiz-Mateos Group–European Democratic Alliance (ARM–ADE)	432	0.25	–0.98	0	±0
Health and Ecology in Solidarity (SEES)	142	0.08	New	0	±0
Natural Law Party (PLN)	82	0.05	New	0	±0
Coalition for a New Socialist Party (CNPS)	76	0.04	New	0	±0
Spanish Democratic Republican Action (ARDE)	73	0.04	New	0	±0
Humanist Party (PH)	71	0.04	New	0	±0
Communist Unification of Spain (UCE)	0	0.00	New	0	±0
Blank ballots	2,125	1.25	+0.05		
Total	170,310			4	±0
Valid votes	170,310	99.44	+0.33		
Invalid votes	967	0.56	–0.33		
Votes cast / turnout	171,277	80.00	+7.96		
Abstentions	42,807	20.00	–7.96		
Registered voters	214,084				

=== 1989 ===
Summary of the 29 October 1989 Congress of Deputies election results in La Rioja
Parties and alliances	Popular vote			Seats	
Parties and alliances	Votes	%	±pp	Total	+/−
People's Party (PP)^{1}	60,737	41.09	+1.87	2	±0
Spanish Socialist Workers' Party (PSOE)	58,678	39.70	–4.22	2	±0
Democratic and Social Centre (CDS)	10,620	7.18	–2.90	0	±0
United Left (IU)	9,495	6.42	+4.42	0	±0
The Ecologist Greens (LVE)	1,893	1.28	New	0	±0
Ruiz-Mateos Group (Ruiz-Mateos)	1,823	1.23	New	0	±0
Workers' Socialist Party (PST)	848	0.57	New	0	±0
Social Democratic Coalition (CSD)	769	0.52	New	0	±0
Workers' Party of Spain–Communist Unity (PTE–UC)^{2}	679	0.46	–0.57	0	±0
Communist Party of the Peoples of Spain (PCPE)	271	0.18	New	0	±0
Spanish Phalanx of the CNSO (FE–JONS)	220	0.15	–0.10	0	±0
Blank ballots	1,775	1.20	+0.28		
Total	147,808			4	±0
Valid votes	147,808	99.11	+1.07		
Invalid votes	1,326	0.89	–1.07		
Votes cast / turnout	149,134	72.04	–2.27		
Abstentions	57,875	27.96	+2.27		
Registered voters	207,009				
Sources
Footnotes: ^{1} People's Party results are compared to People's Coalition totals in the 1986 election.; ^{2} Workers' Party of Spain–Communist Unity results are compared to Communists' Unity Board totals in the 1986 election.

=== 1986 ===
Summary of the 22 June 1986 Congress of Deputies election results in La Rioja
Parties and alliances	Popular vote			Seats	
Parties and alliances	Votes	%	±pp	Total	+/−
Spanish Socialist Workers' Party (PSOE)	65,151	43.92	+0.47	2	±0
People's Coalition (AP–PDP–PL)^{1}	58,177	39.22	–2.31	2	±0
Democratic and Social Centre (CDS)	14,953	10.08	+6.38	0	±0
United Left (IU)^{2}	2,961	2.00	+0.40	0	±0
Democratic Reformist Party (PRD)	2,824	1.90	New	0	±0
Communists' Unity Board (MUC)	1,531	1.03	New	0	±0
Communist Unification of Spain (UCE)	524	0.35	+0.06	0	±0
Spanish Phalanx of the CNSO (FE–JONS)	372	0.25	New	0	±0
Republican Popular Unity (UPR)^{3}	284	0.19	+0.12	0	±0
Party of the Communists of Catalonia (PCC)	190	0.13	New	0	±0
Blank ballots	1,361	0.92	+0.22		
Total	148,328			4	±0
Valid votes	148,328	98.04	+0.52		
Invalid votes	2,968	1.96	–0.52		
Votes cast / turnout	151,296	74.31	–9.79		
Abstentions	52,308	25.69	+9.79		
Registered voters	203,604				
Sources
Footnotes: ^{1} People's Coalition results are compared to People's Alliance–People's Democratic Party totals in the 1982 election.; ^{2} United Left results are compared to Communist Party of Spain totals in the 1982 election.; ^{3} Republican Popular Unity results are compared to Communist Party of Spain (Marxist–Leninist) totals in the 1982 election.

=== 1982 ===
Summary of the 28 October 1982 Congress of Deputies election results in La Rioja
Parties and alliances	Popular vote			Seats	
Parties and alliances	Votes	%	±pp	Total	+/−
Spanish Socialist Workers' Party (PSOE)	67,781	43.45	+14.32	2	+1
People's Alliance–People's Democratic Party (AP–PDP)^{1}	64,778	41.53	+27.66	2	+2
Union of the Democratic Centre (UCD)	11,545	7.40	–40.64	0	–3
Democratic and Social Centre (CDS)	5,774	3.70	New	0	±0
Communist Party of Spain (PCE)	2,491	1.60	–1.97	0	±0
Workers' Socialist Party (PST)	902	0.58	New	0	±0
New Force (FN)^{2}	669	0.43	–0.73	0	±0
Communist Unification of Spain (UCE)	445	0.29	New	0	±
Carlist Party (PC)	224	0.14	–0.29	0	±0
Communist Unity Candidacy (CUC)	184	0.12	New	0	±0
Communist Party of Spain (Marxist–Leninist) (PCE (m–l))	116	0.07	New	0	±0
Riojan Left Coordinator (CIR)	0	0.00	New	0	±0
Blank ballots	1,086	0.70	+0.12		
Total	155,995	100.00		4	±0
Valid votes	155,995	97.52	–1.25		
Invalid votes	3,971	2.48	+1.25		
Votes cast / turnout	159,966	84.10	+10.79		
Abstentions	30,238	15.90	–10.79		
Registered voters	190,204				
Sources
Footnotes: ^{1} People's Alliance–People's Democratic Party results are compared to Democratic Coalition totals in the 1979 election.; ^{2} New Force results are compared to National Union totals in the 1979 election.

=== 1979 ===
Summary of the 1 March 1979 Congress of Deputies election results in Logroño
Parties and alliances	Popular vote			Seats	
Parties and alliances	Votes	%	±pp	Total	+/−
Union of the Democratic Centre (UCD)	64,735	48.04	+6.69	3	+1
Spanish Socialist Workers' Party (PSOE)^{1}	39,245	29.13	+0.52	1	±0
Democratic Coalition (CD)^{2}	18,686	13.87	–0.60	0	–1
Communist Party of Spain (PCE)	4,810	3.57	+0.78	0	±0
National Union (UN)	1,569	1.16	New	0	±0
Workers' Revolutionary Organization (ORT)^{3}	1,546	1.15	–0.29	0	±0
Party of Labour of Spain (PTE)^{4}	1,053	0.78	+0.05	0	±0
Communist Movement–Organization of Communist Left (MC–OIC)	982	0.73	New	0	±0
Carlist Party (PC)	583	0.43	New	0	±0
Republican Left (IR)	462	0.34	New	0	±0
Communist Organization of Spain (Red Flag) (OCE–BR)	274	0.20	New	0	±0
Proverist Party (PPr)	148	0.11	New	0	±0
Blank ballots	646	0.48	+0.12		
Total	134,739			4	±0
Valid votes	134,739	98.77	+0.74		
Invalid votes	1,680	1.23	–0.74		
Votes cast / turnout	136,419	73.31	–10.76		
Abstentions	49,678	26.69	+10.76		
Registered voters	186,097				
Sources
Footnotes: ^{1} Spanish Socialist Workers' Party results are compared to the combined totals of Spanish Socialist Workers' Party and People's Socialist Party–Socialist Unity in the 1977 election.; ^{2} Democratic Coalition results are compared to People's Alliance totals in the 1977 election.; ^{3} Workers' Revolutionary Organization results are compared to Workers' Electoral Group totals in the 1977 election.; ^{4} Party of Labour of Spain results are compared to Democratic Left Front totals in the 1977 election.

=== 1977 ===
Summary of the 15 June 1977 Congress of Deputies election results in Logroño
Parties and alliances	Popular vote			Seats	
Parties and alliances	Votes	%	±pp	Total	+/−
Union of the Democratic Centre (UCD)	56,917	41.35	n/a	2	n/a
Spanish Socialist Workers' Party (PSOE)	36,186	26.29	n/a	1	n/a
People's Alliance (AP)	19,925	14.47	n/a	1	n/a
Riojan Independent Candidacy (CIR)	5,682	4.13	n/a	0	n/a
Communist Party of Spain (PCE)	3,846	2.79	n/a	0	n/a
Federation of Christian Democracy (FPD–ID)	3,593	2.61	n/a	0	n/a
People's Socialist Party–Socialist Unity (PSP–US)	3,188	2.32	n/a	0	n/a
Riojan Independent Group (GIR)	2,399	1.74	n/a	0	n/a
Workers' Electoral Group (AET)	1,986	1.44	n/a	0	n/a
Democratic Socialist Alliance (ASDCI)	1,936	1.41	n/a	0	n/a
Democratic Left Front (FDI)	1,006	0.73	n/a	0	n/a
Spanish Phalanx of the CNSO (Authentic) (FE–JONS(A))	639	0.46	n/a	0	n/a
Blank ballots	356	0.26	n/a		
Total	137,659			4	n/a
Valid votes	137,659	98.03	n/a		
Invalid votes	2,770	1.97	n/a		
Votes cast / turnout	140,429	84.07	n/a		
Abstentions	26,601	15.93	n/a		
Registered voters	167,030				

== Bibliography ==
- Ley 1/1977, de 4 de enero, para la Reforma Política (Fundamental Law 1/1977). Official State Gazette (in Spanish). 4 January 1977. BOE-A-1977-165.
- Real Decreto-ley 20/1977, de 18 de marzo, sobre Normas Electorales (Royal Decree-Law 20/1977). Official State Gazette (in Spanish). 18 March 1977. BOE-A-1977-7445.
- Constitución Española (Constitution). Official State Gazette (in Spanish). 27 December 1978. BOE-A-1978-31229.
- Ley Orgánica 5/1985, de 19 de junio, del Régimen Electoral General (Organic Law 5/1985). Official State Gazette (in Spanish). 19 June 1985. BOE-A-1985-11672.
- Carreras de Odriozola, Albert; Tafunell Sambola, Xavier (2005) [1989]. Estadísticas históricas de España, siglos XIX-XX (PDF) (in Spanish). Vol. 1 (II ed.). Bilbao: Fundación BBVA. pp. 1072–1097. ISBN 84-96515-00-1. Archived from the original (PDF) on 24 September 2015.
