= Albacete (Senate constituency) =

Senate constituency in Spain

Coordinates: 38°50′N 2°00′W

- Senate of Spain; Electoral constituency
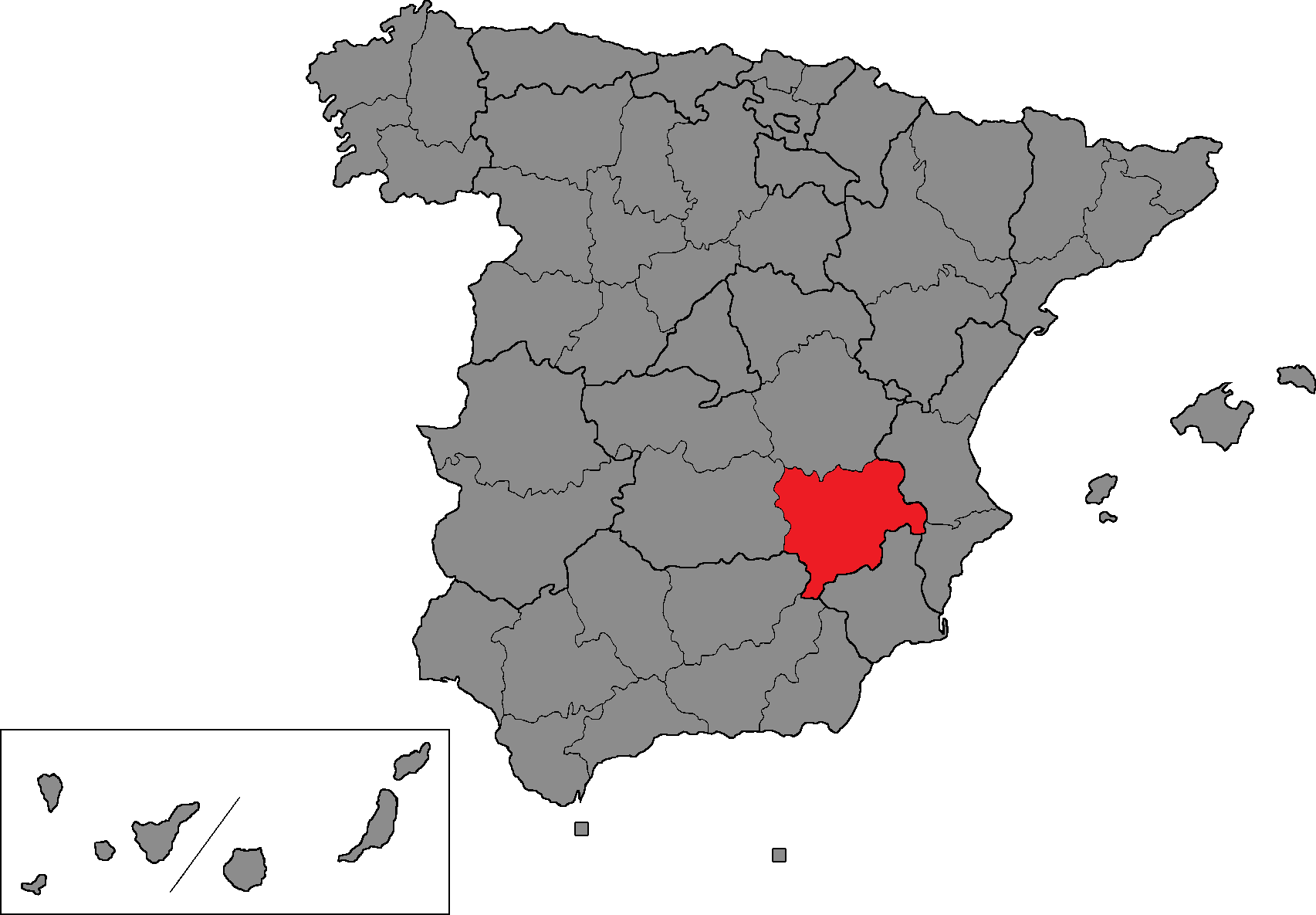
- Location of Albacete within Spain
- Province: Albacete
- Autonomous community: Castilla–La Mancha
- Population: ▲388,599 (2024)
- Electorate: ▼307,988 (2023)
- Major settlements: Albacete

Current constituency
- Created: 1977
- Seats: 4
- Members: PP (3); PSOE (1)

Albacete is one of the 60 constituencies represented in the Senate of Spain, the upper chamber of the Spanish parliament, the Cortes Generales. The constituency (whose boundaries correspond to those of the homonymous province) elects four senators. The electoral system uses open-list (Note: Parties can group candidates into lists, although each candidate is treated separately for the purpose of the voting procedure.) partial block voting, with electors voting for individual candidates instead of parties. Electors can vote for up to three candidates.

== Electoral system ==
The constituency was created as per the Political Reform Law and was first contested in the 1977 general election. The Law provided for the provinces of Spain to be established as multi-member districts in the Senate, with this regulation being maintained under the Spanish Constitution of 1978. Additionally, the Constitution requires for any modification of the provincial limits to be approved under an organic law, needing an absolute majority in the Cortes Generales.

Voting is based on universal suffrage, comprising all Spanish nationals over 18 years of age with full political rights, provided that they have not been deprived of the right to vote by a final sentence. The only exception was in 1977, when this was limited to nationals over 21 years of age and in full enjoyment of their political and civil rights. Amendments in 2011 required non-resident citizens to apply for voting, a system known as "begged" voting (Spanish: Voto rogado). which was abolished in 2022. Further, amendments in 2018 granted the right to vote to those legally incapacitated. 209 Senate seats (207 in 1977, 208 from 1978 to 2026) are elected using open-list partial block voting: voters in constituencies electing four seats can choose up to three candidates; in those with two or three seats, up to two; and in single-member districts, one. Each of the 47 peninsular provinces is allocated four seats, while in insular provinces—such as the Balearic and Canary Islands—the districts are the islands themselves, with the larger ones (Mallorca, Gran Canaria and Tenerife) being allocated three seats each, and the smaller ones (Menorca, Ibiza, Formentera, Fuerteventura, La Gomera, El Hierro, Lanzarote and La Palma) one each. (Note: La Gomera and El Hierro comprised a single constituency for the 1977 election. A constitutional reform in 2026 awarded Formentera an independent senator separate from Ibiza.) Ceuta and Melilla elect two seats each. Until 1985, the law also provided for by-elections to fill Senate seats vacated up to two years into the legislature; subsequently, any vacancies arising after the proclamation of candidates and during the legislative term are filled by the next candidates on the party lists or, when required, by designated substitutes.

The electoral law allows for parties and federations registered in the interior ministry, alliances and groupings of electors to present lists of candidates. Parties and federations intending to form an alliance are required to inform the relevant electoral commission within 10 days of the election call—15 before 1985—whereas groupings of electors need to secure the signature of at least one percent of the electorate in the constituencies for which they seek election—one permille of the electorate, with a compulsory minimum of 500 signatures, until 1985—disallowing electors from signing for more than one list. Also since 2011, parties, federations or alliances that have not obtained a mandate in either chamber of the Cortes at the preceding election are required to secure the signature of at least 0.1 percent of electors in the aforementioned constituencies. Amendments in 2007 required a balanced composition of men and women in the electoral lists, so that candidates of either sex made up at least 40 percent of the total composition; further amendments in 2024 required the use of a zipper system.

== Senators ==
Senators for Albacete 1977–
Key to parties PSOE UCD PP CP AP
Legislature	Election	Distribution
Constituent	1977	1 / 3
1st	1979	2 / 2
2nd	1982	3 / 1
3rd	1986	3 / 1
4th	1989	3 / 1
5th	1993	3 / 1
6th	1996	1 / 3
7th	2000	1 / 3
8th	2004	1 / 3
9th	2008	1 / 3
10th	2011	1 / 3
11th	2015	1 / 3
12th	2016	1 / 3
13th	2019 (Apr)	3 / 1
14th	2019 (Nov)	2 / 2
15th	2023	1 / 3

== General elections ==
=== 2023 ===
Summary of the 23 July 2023 Senate of Spain election results in Albacete
Parties and alliances	Popular vote			Seats	
Parties and alliances	Votes	%	±pp	Total	+/−
People's Party (PP)	268,170	42.32	+6.00	3	+1
Spanish Socialist Workers' Party (PSOE)	224,734	35.46	−0.52	1	−1
Vox (Vox)	89,060	14.05	+7.06	0	±0
Unite (Sumar)^{1}	43,435	6.85	−2.77	0	±0
Animalist Party with the Environment (PACMA)^{2}	2,898	0.46	−0.59	0	±0
For a Fairer World (PUM+J)	1,120	0.18	−0.01	0	±0
Zero Cuts (Recortes Cero)	742	0.12	−0.01	0	±0
Blank ballots (Note: The percentage of blank ballots is calculated over the official number of valid votes cast, irrespective of the total number of votes shown as a result of adding up the individual results for each party.)	3,546	1.62	−0.27		
Total	633,705			4	±0
Valid votes	218,335	97.57	+0.20		
Invalid votes	5,431	2.43	−0.20		
Votes cast / turnout	223,766	72.65	+2.73		
Abstentions	84,222	27.35	−2.73		
Registered voters	307,988				
Sources
Footnotes: ^{1} Unite results are compared to United We Can totals in the November 2019 election.; ^{2} Animalist Party with the Environment results are compared to Animalist Party Against Mistreatment of Animals totals in the November 2019 election.

=== November 2019 ===
Summary of the 10 November 2019 Senate of Spain election results in Albacete
Parties and alliances	Popular vote			Seats	
Parties and alliances	Votes	%	±pp	Total	+/−
People's Party (PP)	206,097	36.32	+10.51	2	+1
Spanish Socialist Workers' Party (PSOE)	204,172	35.98	+2.42	2	−1
United We Can (Podemos–IU)	54,603	9.62	−0.17	0	±0
Citizens–Party of the Citizenry (Cs)	50,318	8.87	−7.48	0	±0
Vox (Vox)	39,678	6.99	−4.89	0	±0
Animalist Party Against Mistreatment of Animals (PACMA)	5,962	1.05	−0.50	0	±0
For a Fairer World (PUM+J)	1,098	0.19	+0.04	0	±0
Communist Party of the Peoples of Spain (PCPE)	751	0.13	−0.02	0	±0
Zero Cuts–Green Group–PCAS–TC (Recortes Cero–GV–PCAS–TC)	725	0.13	−0.01	0	±0
Blank ballots	3,987	1.89	+0.09		
Total	567,391			4	±0
Valid votes	211,044	97.37	+0.06		
Invalid votes	5,691	2.63	−0.06		
Votes cast / turnout	216,735	69.92	−6.33		
Abstentions	93,261	30.08	+6.33		
Registered voters	309,996				

=== April 2019 ===
Summary of the 28 April 2019 Senate of Spain election results in Albacete
Parties and alliances	Popular vote			Seats	
Parties and alliances	Votes	%	±pp	Total	+/−
Spanish Socialist Workers' Party (PSOE)	222,535	33.56	+4.96	3	+2
People's Party (PP)	171,144	25.81	−16.76	1	−2
Citizens–Party of the Citizenry (Cs)	108,432	16.35	+4.35	0	±0
Vox (Vox)	78,769	11.88	New	0	±0
United We Can (Podemos–IU–Equo)	64,940	9.79	−4.16	0	±0
Animalist Party Against Mistreatment of Animals (PACMA)	10,288	1.55	+0.03	0	±0
For a Fairer World (PUM+J)	1,020	0.15	New	0	±0
Communist Party of the Peoples of Spain (PCPE)	970	0.15	+0.04	0	±0
Zero Cuts–Green Group–PCAS–TC (Recortes Cero–GV–PCAS–TC)	932	0.14	−0.02	0	±0
Blank ballots	4,153	1.80	−0.53		
Total	663,183			4	±0
Valid votes	230,180	97.31	+0.06		
Invalid votes	6,351	2.69	−0.06		
Votes cast / turnout	236,531	76.25	+5.19		
Abstentions	73,676	23.75	−5.19		
Registered voters	310,207				

=== 2016 ===
Summary of the 26 June 2016 Senate of Spain election results in Albacete
Parties and alliances	Popular vote			Seats	
Parties and alliances	Votes	%	±pp	Total	+/−
People's Party (PP)	261,739	42.57	+4.65	3	±0
Spanish Socialist Workers' Party (PSOE)	175,887	28.60	−0.35	1	±0
United We Can (Podemos–IU–Equo)^{1}	85,770	13.95	−3.08	0	±0
Citizens–Party of the Citizenry (C's)	73,797	12.00	−0.51	0	±0
Animalist Party Against Mistreatment of Animals (PACMA)	9,363	1.52	+0.35	0	±0
Union, Progress and Democracy (UPyD)	1,184	0.19	−0.48	0	±0
Zero Cuts–Green Group (Recortes Cero–GV)	994	0.16	+0.02	0	±0
Communist Party of the Peoples of Spain (PCPE)	650	0.11	−0.04	0	±0
Spanish Phalanx of the CNSO (FE de las JONS)	539	0.09	New	0	±0
Blank ballots	4,985	2.33	−1.32		
Total	614,908			4	±0
Valid votes	214,273	97.25	+0.47		
Invalid votes	6,057	2.75	−0.47		
Votes cast / turnout	220,330	71.06	−3.59		
Abstentions	89,753	28.94	+3.59		
Registered voters	310,083				
Sources
Footnotes: ^{1} United We Can results are compared to the combined totals of We Can and United Left–Popular Unity in Common in the 2015 election.

=== 2015 ===
Summary of the 20 December 2015 Senate of Spain election results in Albacete
Parties and alliances	Popular vote			Seats	
Parties and alliances	Votes	%	±pp	Total	+/−
People's Party (PP)	242,041	37.92	−19.25	3	±0
Spanish Socialist Workers' Party (PSOE)	184,790	28.95	−2.54	1	±0
We Can (Podemos)	82,880	12.98	New	0	±0
Citizens–Party of the Citizenry (C's)	79,871	12.51	New	0	±0
United Left–Popular Unity in Common (IU–UPeC)	25,831	4.05	−1.54	0	±0
Animalist Party Against Mistreatment of Animals (PACMA)	7,482	1.17	+0.84	0	±0
Union, Progress and Democracy (UPyD)	4,256	0.67	−1.04	0	±0
Vox (Vox)	1,174	0.18	New	0	±0
Communist Party of the Peoples of Spain (PCPE)	952	0.15	+0.04	0	±0
Zero Cuts–Green Group (Recortes Cero–GV)	864	0.14	New	0	±0
Blank ballots	8,194	3.65	−1.17		
Total	638,335			4	±0
Valid votes	224,453	96.78	+0.57		
Invalid votes	7,476	3.22	−0.57		
Votes cast / turnout	231,929	74.65	−1.29		
Abstentions	78,745	25.35	+1.29		
Registered voters	310,674				

=== 2011 ===
Summary of the 20 November 2011 Senate of Spain election results in Albacete
Parties and alliances	Popular vote			Seats	
Parties and alliances	Votes	%	±pp	Total	+/−
People's Party (PP)	358,536	57.17	+9.83	3	±0
Spanish Socialist Workers' Party (PSOE)	197,487	31.49	−14.88	1	±0
United Left of Castilla–La Mancha–The Greens: Plural Left (IUCLM–LV)	35,078	5.59	+2.38	0	±0
Union, Progress and Democracy (UPyD)	10,706	1.71	+0.27	0	±0
Blank Seats (EB)	8,280	1.32	New	0	±0
For a Fairer World (PUM+J)	3,004	0.48	+0.39	0	±0
Animalist Party Against Mistreatment of Animals (PACMA)	2,083	0.33	+0.19	0	±0
Communist Party of the Peoples of Spain (PCPE)	681	0.11	+0.08	0	±0
Centre and Democracy Forum (CyD)	358	0.06	New	0	±0
Blank ballots	10,892	4.82	+2.48		
Total	627,105			4	±0
Valid votes	226,077	96.21	−1.58		
Invalid votes	8,910	3.79	+1.58		
Votes cast / turnout	234,987	75.94	−4.29		
Abstentions	74,469	24.06	+4.29		
Registered voters	309,456				

=== 2008 ===
Summary of the 9 March 2008 Senate of Spain election results in Albacete
Parties and alliances	Popular vote			Seats	
Parties and alliances	Votes	%	±pp	Total	+/−
People's Party (PP)	320,578	47.34	−0.19	3	±0
Spanish Socialist Workers' Party (PSOE)	313,952	46.37	−0.60	1	±0
United Left–Alternative (IU)	21,742	3.21	−0.66	0	±0
Union, Progress and Democracy (UPyD)	9,754	1.44	New	0	±0
The Greens of Europe (LVdE)	1,812	0.27	New	0	±0
Anti-Bullfighting Party Against Mistreatment of Animals (PACMA)	960	0.14	New	0	±0
For a Fairer World (PUM+J)	593	0.09	New	0	±0
Commoners' Land (TC)	305	0.05	−0.03	0	±0
Humanist Party (PH)	303	0.04	New	0	±0
Social Democratic Party (PSD)	293	0.04	New	0	±0
Family and Life Party (PFyV)	246	0.04	−0.02	0	±0
Spanish Phalanx of the CNSO (FE de las JONS)	229	0.03	New	0	±0
Communist Party of the Peoples of Spain (PCPE)	187	0.03	−0.02	0	±0
National Democracy (DN)	178	0.03	−0.01	0	±0
Authentic Phalanx (FA)	155	0.02	−0.01	0	±0
Internationalist Socialist Workers' Party (POSI)	110	0.02	−0.02	0	±0
Spanish Alternative (AES)	104	0.02	New	0	±0
Carlist Traditionalist Communion (CTC)	54	0.01	±0.00	0	±0
Blank ballots	5,570	2.34	−1.00		
Total	677,125			4	±0
Valid votes	237,923	97.79	+0.43		
Invalid votes	5,365	2.21	−0.43		
Votes cast / turnout	243,288	80.23	+1.00		
Abstentions	59,940	19.77	−1.00		
Registered voters	303,228				

=== 2004 ===
Summary of the 14 March 2004 Senate of Spain election results in Albacete
Parties and alliances	Popular vote			Seats	
Parties and alliances	Votes	%	±pp	Total	+/−
People's Party (PP)	312,717	47.53	−5.14	3	±0
Spanish Socialist Workers' Party (PSOE)	309,010	46.97	+15.43	1	±0
United Left–Left of Castilla–La Mancha (IU–ICAM)	25,430	3.87	−9.96	0	±0
Democratic and Social Centre (CDS)	509	0.08	−0.01	0	±0
Commoners' Land–Castilian Nationalist Party (TC–PNC)	506	0.08	−0.07	0	±0
Family and Life Party (PFyV)	399	0.06	New	0	±0
Communist Party of the Peoples of Spain (PCPE)	327	0.05	New	0	±0
Internationalist Socialist Workers' Party (POSI)	289	0.04	New	0	±0
National Democracy (DN)	284	0.04	New	0	±0
The Phalanx (FE)	197	0.03	−0.03	0	±0
Authentic Phalanx (FA)	189	0.03	New	0	±0
Republican Left–Socialist Action Party (IR–PASOC)	165	0.03	New	0	±0
Spanish Democratic Party (PADE)	162	0.02	−0.03	0	±0
Carlist Traditionalist Communion (CTC)	64	0.01	New	0	±0
Blank ballots	7,688	3.34	+0.32		
Total	657,936			4	±0
Valid votes	230,459	97.36	±0,00		
Invalid votes	6,259	2.64	±0.00		
Votes cast / turnout	236,718	79.23	+3.64		
Abstentions	62,062	20.77	−3.64		
Registered voters	298,780				

=== 2000 ===
Summary of the 12 March 2000 Senate of Spain election results in Albacete
Parties and alliances	Popular vote			Seats	
Parties and alliances	Votes	%	±pp	Total	+/−
People's Party (PP)	315,135	52.67	+7.80	3	±0
Spanish Socialist Workers' Party–Progressives (PSOE–p)	188,720	31.54	−12.51	1	±0
United Left (IU)	82,775	13.83	+4.26	0	±0
Liberal Independent Group (GIL)	1,736	0.29	New	0	±0
Commoners' Land–Castilian Nationalist Party (TC–PNC)	908	0.15	+0.13	0	±0
Humanist Party (PH)	622	0.10	−0.05	0	±0
Centrist Union–Democratic and Social Centre (UC–CDS)	563	0.09	−0.22	0	±0
Independent Spanish Phalanx–Phalanx 2000 (FEI–FE 2000)	524	0.09	New	0	±0
The Phalanx (FE)	372	0.06	New	0	±0
Spanish Democratic Party (PADE)	306	0.05	New	0	±0
Valencian Union (UV)	122	0.02	±0.00	0	±0
Blank ballots	6,555	3.02	+0.69		
Total	598,338			4	±0
Valid votes	217,193	97.36	−0.69		
Invalid votes	5,886	2.64	+0.69		
Votes cast / turnout	223,079	75.59	−7.88		
Abstentions	72,026	24.41	+7.88		
Registered voters	295,105				

=== 1996 ===
Summary of the 3 March 1996 Senate of Spain election results in Albacete
Parties and alliances	Popular vote			Seats	
Parties and alliances	Votes	%	±pp	Total	+/−
People's Party (PP)	300,496	44.87	+4.08	3	+2
Spanish Socialist Workers' Party (PSOE)	295,050	44.05	−2.52	1	−2
United Left–Left of Castilla–La Mancha (IU–ICAM)	64,091	9.57	+0.26	0	±0
Centrist Union (UC)	2,094	0.31	−1.70	0	±0
Humanist Party (PH)	1,003	0.15	+0.11	0	±0
Regionalist Party of Castilla–La Mancha (PRCM)	802	0.12	New	0	±0
Authentic Spanish Phalanx (FEA)	271	0.04	New	0	±0
Commoners' Land–Castilian Nationalist Party (TC–PNC)	164	0.02	−0.02	0	±0
Republican Coalition (CR)^{1}	129	0.02	±0.00	0	±0
Alliance for National Unity (AUN)	125	0.02	New	0	±0
Valencian Union (UV)	101	0.02	New	0	±0
Blank ballots	5,420	2.33	+0.67		
Total	669,746			4	±0
Valid votes	232,295	98.05	+0.15		
Invalid votes	4,628	1.95	−0.15		
Votes cast / turnout	236,923	83.47	+1.05		
Abstentions	46,928	16.53	−1.05		
Registered voters	283,851				
Sources
Footnotes: ^{1} Republican Coalition results are compared to Coalition for a New Socialist Party totals in the 1993 election.

=== 1993 ===
Summary of the 6 June 1993 Senate of Spain election results in Albacete
Parties and alliances	Popular vote			Seats	
Parties and alliances	Votes	%	±pp	Total	+/−
Spanish Socialist Workers' Party (PSOE)	296,302	46.57	−4.15	3	±0
People's Party (PP)	259,493	40.79	+10.04	1	±0
United Left (IU)	59,212	9.31	+0.34	0	±0
Democratic and Social Centre (CDS)	12,816	2.01	−5.60	0	±0
The Greens (Verdes)	2,638	0.41	New	0	±0
Ruiz-Mateos Group–European Democratic Alliance (ARM–ADE)	1,499	0.24	−0.08	0	±0
Commoners' Land–Castilian Nationalist Party (TC–PNC)	264	0.04	New	0	±0
Humanist Party (PH)	259	0.04	−0.06	0	±0
Coalition for a New Socialist Party (CNPS)	110	0.02	New	0	±0
Communist Unification of Spain (UCE)	0	0.00	New	0	±0
Blank ballots	3,642	1.66	−0.20		
Total	636,235			4	±0
Valid votes	219,915	97.90	+0.81		
Invalid votes	4,706	2.10	−0.81		
Votes cast / turnout	224,621	82.42	+5.96		
Abstentions	47,915	17.58	−5.96		
Registered voters	272,536				

=== 1989 ===
Summary of the 29 October 1989 Senate of Spain election results in Albacete
Parties and alliances	Popular vote			Seats	
Parties and alliances	Votes	%	±pp	Total	+/−
Spanish Socialist Workers' Party (PSOE)	278,953	50.72	−0.61	3	±0
People's Party (PP)^{1}	169,127	30.75	−1.58	1	±0
United Left (IU)	49,310	8.97	+4.09	0	±0
Democratic and Social Centre (CDS)	41,871	7.61	−0.26	0	±0
Workers' Party of Spain–Communist Unity (PTE–UC)^{2}	2,586	0.47	−0.62	0	±0
Ruiz-Mateos Group (Ruiz-Mateos)	1,750	0.32	New	0	±0
Communists in the Senate Coalition (CS)	1,173	0.21	New	0	±0
Spanish Phalanx of the CNSO (FE–JONS)	604	0.11	−0.17	0	±0
Humanist Party (PH)	563	0.10	New	0	±0
Workers' Socialist Party (PST)	436	0.08	New	0	±0
Blank ballots	3,573	1.86	−0.05		
Total	549,946			4	±0
Valid votes	192,181	97.09	+0.53		
Invalid votes	5,750	2.91	−0.53		
Votes cast / turnout	197,931	76.46	+4.27		
Abstentions	60,924	23.54	−4.27		
Registered voters	258,855				
Sources
Footnotes: ^{1} People's Party results are compared to People's Coalition totals in the 1986 election.; ^{2} Workers' Party of Spain–Communist Unity results are compared to Communists' Unity Board totals in the 1986 election.

=== 1986 ===
Summary of the 22 June 1986 Senate of Spain election results in Albacete
Parties and alliances	Popular vote			Seats	
Parties and alliances	Votes	%	±pp	Total	+/−
Spanish Socialist Workers' Party (PSOE)	267,541	51.33	−2.20	3	±0
People's Coalition (AP–PDP–PL)^{1}	168,502	32.33	+3.86	1	±0
Democratic and Social Centre (CDS)	41,003	7.87	+6.06	0	±0
United Left (IU)^{2}	25,434	4.88	−0.02	0	±0
Communists' Unity Board (MUC)	5,681	1.09	New	0	±0
Democratic Reformist Party (PRD)	4,010	0.77	New	0	±0
Spanish Vertex Ecological Development Revindication (VERDE)	3,413	0.65	New	0	±0
Spanish Phalanx of the CNSO (FE–JONS)	1,483	0.28	New	0	±0
Republican Popular Unity (UPR)	288	0.06	New	0	±0
Communist Unification of Spain (UCE)	150	0.03	−0.02	0	±0
Internationalist Socialist Workers' Party (POSI)	126	0.02	New	0	±0
Blank ballots	3,536	1.91	+0.43		
Total	521,167			4	±0
Valid votes	184,920	96.56	+10.95		
Invalid votes	6,585	3.44	−10.95		
Votes cast / turnout	191,505	72.19	−10.06		
Abstentions	73,762	27.81	+10.06		
Registered voters	265,267				
Sources
Footnotes: ^{1} People's Coalition results are compared to People's Alliance–People's Democratic Party totals in the 1982 election.; ^{2} United Left results are compared to Communist Party of Spain totals in the 1982 election.

=== 1982 ===
Summary of the 28 October 1982 Senate of Spain election results in Albacete
Parties and alliances	Popular vote			Seats	
Parties and alliances	Votes	%	±pp	Total	+/−
Spanish Socialist Workers' Party (PSOE)	297,564	53.53	+14.57	3	+1
People's Alliance–People's Democratic Party (AP–PDP)^{1}	158,251	28.47	+21.86	1	+1
Union of the Democratic Centre (UCD)	51,007	9.18	−29.95	0	−2
Communist Party of Spain (PCE)	27,261	4.90	−8.71	0	±0
Democratic and Social Centre (CDS)	10,060	1.81	New	0	±0
New Force (FN)	4,321	0.78	New	0	±0
Spanish Solidarity (SE)	2,635	0.47	New	0	±0
Workers' Socialist Party (PST)	1,970	0.35	New	0	±0
Communist Unity Candidacy (CUC)	294	0.05	New	0	±0
Socialist Party (PS)^{2}	0	0.00	−0.46	0	±0
Blank ballots	2,498	1.48	+0.33		
Total	555,861			4	±0
Valid votes	169,096	85.61	−12.29		
Invalid votes	28,430	14.39	+12.29		
Votes cast / turnout	197,526	82.25	+11.50		
Abstentions	42,629	17.75	−11.50		
Registered voters	240,155				
Sources
Footnotes: ^{1} People's Alliance–People's Democratic Party results are compared to Democratic Coalition totals in the 1979 election.; ^{2} Socialist Party results are compared to Spanish Socialist Workers' Party (historical) totals in the 1979 election.

=== 1979 ===
Summary of the 1 March 1979 Senate of Spain election results in Albacete
Parties and alliances	Popular vote			Seats	
Parties and alliances	Votes	%	±pp	Total	+/−
Union of the Democratic Centre (UCD)	191,628	39.13	−7.39	2	−1
Spanish Socialist Workers' Party (PSOE)^{1}	190,770	38.96	+3.06	2	+1
Communist Party of Spain (PCE)	66,648	13.61	New	0	±0
Democratic Coalition (CD)^{2}	32,343	6.61	−3.25	0	±0
Spanish Socialist Workers' Party (historical) (PSOEh)	2,268	0.46	New	0	±0
Party of Labour of Spain (PTE)	2,087	0.43	New	0	±0
Carlist Party (PC)	1,105	0.23	New	0	±0
Authentic Spanish Phalanx (FEA)	916	0.19	New	0	±0
Blank ballots	1,903	1.15			
Total	489,668			4	±0
Valid votes	165,320	97.90			
Invalid votes	3,542	2.10			
Votes cast / turnout	168,862	70.75			
Abstentions	69,820	29.25			
Registered voters	238,682				
Sources
Footnotes: ^{1} Spanish Socialist Workers' Party results are compared to the combined totals of Democratic Group of Albacete and Spanish Socialist Workers' Party in the 1977 election.; ^{2} Democratic Coalition results are compared to People's Alliance totals in the 1977 election.

=== 1977 ===
Summary of the 15 June 1977 Senate of Spain election results in Albacete
Parties and alliances	Popular vote			Seats	
Parties and alliances	Votes	%	±pp	Total	+/−
Union of the Democratic Centre (UCD)	198,622	46.52	n/a	3	n/a
Democratic Group of Albacete (ADA)	78,510	18.39	n/a	0	n/a
Spanish Socialist Workers' Party (PSOE)	74,776	17.51	n/a	1	n/a
People's Alliance (AP)	42,107	9.86	n/a	0	n/a
Independents (INDEP)	32,919	7.71	n/a	0	n/a
Blank ballots			n/a		
Total	426,934			4	n/a
Valid votes			n/a		
Invalid votes			n/a		
Votes cast / turnout			n/a		
Abstentions			n/a		
Registered voters	211,249				

== Bibliography ==
- Ley 1/1977, de 4 de enero, para la Reforma Política (Fundamental Law 1/1977). Official State Gazette (in Spanish). 4 January 1977. BOE-A-1977-165.
- Real Decreto-ley 20/1977, de 18 de marzo, sobre Normas Electorales (Royal Decree-Law 20/1977). Official State Gazette (in Spanish). 18 March 1977. BOE-A-1977-7445.
- Constitución Española (Constitution). Official State Gazette (in Spanish). 27 December 1978. BOE-A-1978-31229.
- Ley Orgánica 5/1985, de 19 de junio, del Régimen Electoral General (Organic Law 5/1985). Official State Gazette (in Spanish). 19 June 1985. BOE-A-1985-11672.
- Carreras de Odriozola, Albert; Tafunell Sambola, Xavier (2005) [1989]. Estadísticas históricas de España, siglos XIX-XX (PDF) (in Spanish). Vol. 1 (II ed.). Bilbao: Fundación BBVA. pp. 1072–1097. ISBN 84-96515-00-1. Archived from the original (PDF) on 24 September 2015.
