= Amparo Torres =

Spanish politician (born 1980)

Member of the Senate
- Incumbent
- Assumed office 23 July 2023
- Constituency: Albacete

Personal details
- Born: 12 June 1980 (age 45)
- Party: Spanish Socialist Workers' Party

Amparo Torres Valencoso (born 12 June 1980) is a Spanish politician serving as a member of the Senate since 2023. From 2019 to 2023, she served as second vice president of the provincial deputation of Albacete.
