= Narciso Perales =

Narciso Perales (3 September 1914 – 18 June 1993) was a Spanish Falangist who went from being decorated by order of José Antonio Primo de Rivera to be confined and victimized under the Francoist Spain because of ideological differences.

Perales joined the early Movimiento Español Sindicalista (MES) in 1933 and was one of the original members of Falange Española de las JONS, quickly rising in its ranks due to his intense militancy and ideological commitment. His revolutionary fervor and early activism led José Antonio Primo de Rivera to personally award him the Palma de Plata, one of the highest decorations within the Falangist movement, in October 1935. During the early stages of the Spanish Civil War, Perales was based in Granada, where he assumed local leadership roles within the Falange. His actions during this period have drawn scholarly attention, especially his intervention to protect poet Luis Rosales and possibly the ill-fated Federico García Lorca from repression, a rare example of intra-rightist dissent during a time of mounting violence.

Despite his unwavering adherence to the ideals of national syndicalism, Perales grew increasingly alienated from Francoist Spain, particularly as the regime departed from its early promises of revolutionary reform. His 1939 arrest for attempting to form a dissident Falange Auténtica marked a clear rupture between Perales and the regime he had once served. Though briefly appointed as civil governor of León in 1941, he resigned in protest following the execution of fellow Falangist Juan José Domínguez Muñoz, denouncing what he perceived as a betrayal of the Falange's revolutionary mission. This act of defiance led to his confinement and solidified his status as a marginal yet principled dissident within the broader Falangist milieu.

Perales's postwar activities reflect his enduring commitment to national syndicalism divorced from Francoist authoritarianism. In the 1950s, he helped organize the Alianza Sindicalista, a syndicalist alternative rooted in early Falangist principles. By the 1960s, he co-founded the Frente Sindicalista Revolucionario (FSR), an organization that adopted black and red colors, symbolizing a break from traditional Falangist symbolism—and advocated for worker self-management, a concept resonating with libertarian socialist ideals. His ideological shift illustrates how sectors of Falangism resisted Franco’s transformation of the movement into a vehicle of conservative, bureaucratic rule, seeking instead to reassert its original revolutionary ethos.

During Spain’s transition to democracy, Perales remained politically active. In 1976, he became the national chief of the Falange Española Auténtica, a splinter group that revived the pre-1937 program of the Falange and positioned itself in opposition to both the Francoist legacy and liberal democracy. His leadership in the FEA reflected a persistent ideological nostalgia for José Antonio’s original vision—one rooted in spiritual nationalism and social justice through syndicalist revolution.

Though marginal in political influence, Narciso Perales represents a rare continuity of Falangist idealism divorced from the state apparatus of Francoism. His lifelong commitment to national syndicalism, his personal sacrifices, and his rejection of authoritarian distortion of Falangist doctrine underscore a complex and often overlooked current within Spain’s 20th-century right-wing politics. His legacy, though contested, offers a case study in ideological fidelity and dissent within a broader authoritarian context.

== See also ==
- Politics of Spain
