= Workers' Revolutionary Party (Spain) =

Workers' Revolutionary Party Partido Revolucionario de los Trabajadores
- Founded: 1994
- Dissolved: 2002
- Merged into: United Left (1998–2002)
- Ideology: Trotskyism
- Political position: Far-left

Workers' Revolutionary Party (Spanish: Partido Revolucionario de los Trabajadores, PRT) was a Spanish trotskyist political party founded in 1994 by the merger of the Workers' Socialist Party (Socialist Truth) (PST (LVS)) and the Group for Building a Revolutionary Workers' Party (GPOR). Both parties initially contested the 1994 European Parliament election as the GPOR–PST (LVS) coalition. The PRT eventually joined United Left (IU) in 1998, and in 2002 it merged with Revolutionary Left (IR) to form the Workers' Revolutionary Party–Revolutionary Left (PRT–IR).

== Member parties ==
- Workers' Socialist Party (Socialist Truth) (PST (LVS))
- Group for Building a Revolutionary Workers' Party (GPOR)
