= Falange Española de las JONS (Auténtica) =

Spanish Phalanx of the CNSO (Authentic) Falange Española de las JONS (Auténtica)
- President: Narciso Perales
- Founded: May 29, 1976
- Dissolved: December 6, 1980
- Split from: Spanish Falange of the CNSO
- Headquarters: Madrid
- Ideology: Falangism; National syndicalism Spanish nationalism National Catholicism
- Political position: Far-right

Falange Española de las JONS (Auténtica) (English: Spanish Phalanx of the CNSO (Authentic), FE–JONS(A)) was a falangist political party, split from Spanish Falange of the JONS, which contested both the 1977 and 1979 general elections.
