= Republican Coalition (Spain, 1996) =

Republican Coalition Coalición Republicana
- Founded: 1996
- Dissolved: 1996
- Preceded by: Coalition for a New Socialist Party
- Ideology: Communism
- Political position: Left-wing

Republican Coalition (Spanish: Coalición Republicana, CR) was a Spanish electoral alliance formed to contest the 1996 general election by the Internationalist Socialist Workers' Party (POSI) and Socialist Democratic Alliance (ADS).

== Member parties ==
- Internationalist Socialist Workers' Party (POSI)
- Socialist Democratic Alliance (ADS)
