= Falange Española Auténtica =

Authentic Spanish Falange Falange España Auténtica (Spanish)
- Abbreviation: FEA
- Leader: Miguel Hedilla (first); Ángel Gómez Puértolas (last)
- Founded: c. 1978
- Dissolved: c. 1994
- Split from: Falange Española de las JONS (Auténtica)
- Headquarters: Spain
- Ideology: Neo-fascism Falangism; Spanish nationalism Anti-Francoism
- Political position: Far-right
- Colours: Red and black

Party flag

Falange Española Auténtica (FEA) (English: Authentic Spanish Falange) was a Falangist and anti-Francoist political party in Spain, born after the dissolution of the original FET y de las JONS.

== History ==
Falange Española Auténtica was founded in 1978 by expelled members of the Falange Española de las JONS (Auténtica) led by Miguel Hedilla. In 1984, Miguel Hedilla resigned as leader of the party and Ángel Gómez Puértolas took his place. In 1994, FEA ceased to exist after the majority of members left the party and joined Falange Española de las JONS.

== Electoral results ==
Congress of Deputies
Election year	Overall votes	Percentage	Seats won	+/–	Leader
1979	2,736 (#46)	0.02%	0 / 350	New	Miguel Hedilla
1993	747 (#63)	0%	0 / 350	0	Ángel Gómez Puértolas

== Bibliography ==
- Ruiz Carnicer, Miguel Ángel (2022). "El Populismo Falangista" [Populism in the Spanish Falange] (PDF). El Futuro del Pasado. 13: 101–128. doi:10.14201/fdp.27258.
- Carter, Elisabeth (2005). The extreme right in Western Europe. Manchester University Press. p. 51. ISBN 0-7190-7048-1.
