= Workers' Socialist Party (Spain) =

Socialist Workers' Party Partido Socialista de los Trabajadores
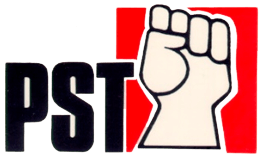
- Secretary-General: Enrique del Olmo, Ángel Luis Parras and Enrique Mosquera
- Founded: 1979
- Dissolved: 1993
- Merger of: Socialist Revolutionary League and a sector of the LCR
- Headquarters: Madrid
- Newspaper: La Verdad Socialista
- Ideology: Marxism–Leninism; Trotskyism
- Political position: Far-left
- International affiliation: International Workers League – Fourth International

Partido Socialista de los Trabajadores (PST) was a Trotskyist Spanish political party founded in 1979 and dissolved in 1993. The PST presented lists in coalition with the Revolutionary Workers' Party (PORE), but despite being one of the parties of the Spanish radical left with better election results it was always an extra-parliamentary party.

== History ==
On February 1, 1980 Yolanda González Martín, a prominent student leader and member of the PST, was kidnapped and murdered in Madrid by members of a right-wing terrorist group. Her murderer today works for the Ministry of the Interior.

In 1993 it was divided into two sectors: PST (Verdad Socialista), which in 1994 merged with the Group for the construction of a Revolutionary Workers Party (GPOR) to create the Workers' Revolutionary Party (PRT), that in 1998 joined United Left; and PST (Contra Corriente) that was dissolved a few months later.

== Election results ==
Election results
Year	Vote	%
1982 Spanish general election	103,133	0.49%
1986 Spanish general election	77,914	0.39%
European Parliament election, 1987	77,132	0.40%
1989 European Parliament election	38,683	0.24%
1989 Spanish general election	81,218	0.40%
1993 Spanish general election	30,068	0.13%
