= 1983 Spanish local elections in Asturias =

This article presents the results breakdown of the local elections held in Asturias on 8 May 1983. The following tables show detailed results in the autonomous community's most populous municipalities, sorted alphabetically.

== City control ==
The following table lists party control in the most populous municipalities, including provincial capitals (highlighted in bold). Gains for a party are highlighted in that party's colour.

| Municipality | Population | Previous control | New control |
|---|---|---|---|
| Avilés | 87,996 | Spanish Socialist Workers' Party (PSOE) | Spanish Socialist Workers' Party (PSOE) |
| Gijón | 256,433 | Spanish Socialist Workers' Party (PSOE) | Spanish Socialist Workers' Party (PSOE) |
| Langreo | 56,347 | Spanish Socialist Workers' Party (PSOE) | Spanish Socialist Workers' Party (PSOE) |
| Mieres | 58,718 | Spanish Socialist Workers' Party (PSOE) | Spanish Socialist Workers' Party (PSOE) |
| **Oviedo** | 184,473 | Union of the Democratic Centre (UCD) | Spanish Socialist Workers' Party (PSOE) |
| San Martín del Rey Aurelio | 25,761 | Spanish Socialist Workers' Party (PSOE) | Spanish Socialist Workers' Party (PSOE) |
| Siero | 40,350 | Spanish Socialist Workers' Party (PSOE) | Spanish Socialist Workers' Party (PSOE) |

== Municipalities ==
=== Avilés ===
Population: 87,996

← Summary of the 8 May 1983 City Council of Avilés election results →
| Parties and alliances | Popular vote | | | Seats | |
| Parties and alliances | Votes | % | ±pp | Total | +/− |
|---|---|---|---|---|---|
| Spanish Socialist Workers' Party (PSOE) | 28,481 | 63.40 | +27.08 | 17 | +7 |
| People's Coalition (AP–PDP–UL)^{1} | 10,146 | 22.58 | +21.62 | 6 | +6 |
| Communist Party of Spain (PCE) | 4,023 | 8.95 | −7.66 | 2 | −2 |
| Democratic and Social Centre (CDS) | 1,730 | 3.85 | New | 0 | ±0 |
| Independents (INDEP) | 546 | 1.22 | New | 0 | ±0 |
| Union of the Democratic Centre (UCD) | n/a | n/a | −40.71 | 0 | −11 |
| Blank ballots | 0 | 0.00 | ±0.00 | | |
| Total | 44,926 | | | 25 | ±0 |
| Valid votes | 44,926 | 98.07 | −1.28 | | |
| Invalid votes | 886 | 1.93 | +1.28 | | |
| Votes cast / turnout | 45,812 | 70.59 | +10.87 | | |
| Abstentions | 19,086 | 29.41 | −10.87 | | |
| Registered voters | 64,898 | | | | |
Sources
Footnotes: ^{1} People's Coalition results are compared to Democratic Coalition totals in the 1979 election.

=== Gijón ===
Population: 256,433

← Summary of the 8 May 1983 City Council of Gijón election results →
| Parties and alliances | Popular vote | | | Seats | |
| Parties and alliances | Votes | % | ±pp | Total | +/− |
|---|---|---|---|---|---|
| Spanish Socialist Workers' Party (PSOE) | 69,116 | 57.45 | +16.10 | 17 | +4 |
| People's Coalition (AP–PDP–UL)^{1} | 32,454 | 26.98 | +21.57 | 7 | +6 |
| Communist Party of Spain (PCE) | 12,652 | 10.52 | −4.63 | 3 | −1 |
| Democratic and Social Centre (CDS) | 3,876 | 3.22 | New | 0 | ±0 |
| Independents (INDEP) | 2,200 | 1.83 | New | 0 | ±0 |
| Union of the Democratic Centre (UCD) | n/a | n/a | −28.74 | 0 | −9 |
| Blank ballots | 0 | 0.00 | ±0.00 | | |
| Total | 120,298 | | | 27 | ±0 |
| Valid votes | 120,298 | 97.14 | −2.22 | | |
| Invalid votes | 3,539 | 2.86 | +2.22 | | |
| Votes cast / turnout | 123,837 | 64.72 | +9.30 | | |
| Abstentions | 67,516 | 35.28 | −9.30 | | |
| Registered voters | 191,353 | | | | |
Sources
Footnotes: ^{1} People's Coalition results are compared to Democratic Coalition totals in the 1979 election.

=== Langreo ===
Population: 56,347

← Summary of the 8 May 1983 City Council of Langreo election results →
| Parties and alliances | Popular vote | | | Seats | |
| Parties and alliances | Votes | % | ±pp | Total | +/− |
|---|---|---|---|---|---|
| Spanish Socialist Workers' Party (PSOE) | 16,145 | 55.03 | +17.47 | 14 | +4 |
| Communist Party of Spain (PCE) | 6,465 | 22.04 | −3.65 | 6 | −1 |
| People's Coalition (AP–PDP–UL)^{1} | 5,774 | 19.68 | +12.71 | 5 | +3 |
| Unified Communist Party (PCU) | 757 | 2.58 | New | 0 | ±0 |
| Revolutionary Communist League (LCR) | 196 | 0.67 | −0.25 | 0 | ±0 |
| Union of the Democratic Centre (UCD) | n/a | n/a | −21.55 | 0 | −6 |
| Blank ballots | 0 | 0.00 | ±0.00 | | |
| Total | 29,337 | | | 25 | ±0 |
| Valid votes | 29,337 | 99.02 | −0.05 | | |
| Invalid votes | 289 | 0.98 | +0.05 | | |
| Votes cast / turnout | 29,626 | 65.29 | +5.36 | | |
| Abstentions | 15,753 | 34.71 | −5.36 | | |
| Registered voters | 45,379 | | | | |
Sources
Footnotes: ^{1} People's Coalition results are compared to Democratic Coalition totals in the 1979 election.

=== Mieres ===
Population: 58,718

← Summary of the 8 May 1983 City Council of Mieres election results →
| Parties and alliances | Popular vote | | | Seats | |
| Parties and alliances | Votes | % | ±pp | Total | +/− |
|---|---|---|---|---|---|
| Spanish Socialist Workers' Party (PSOE) | 16,693 | 54.61 | +15.13 | 15 | +5 |
| Communist Party of Spain (PCE) | 6,986 | 22.85 | −10.12 | 6 | −3 |
| People's Coalition (AP–PDP–UL)^{1} | 5,262 | 17.21 | +10.38 | 4 | +3 |
| Communist Movement (MC) | 1,021 | 3.34 | −2.53 | 0 | −1 |
| Democratic and Social Centre (CDS) | 606 | 1.98 | New | 0 | ±0 |
| Union of the Democratic Centre (UCD) | n/a | n/a | −14.84 | 0 | −4 |
| Blank ballots | 0 | 0.00 | ±0.00 | | |
| Total | 30,568 | | | 25 | ±0 |
| Valid votes | 30,568 | 98.82 | −0.10 | | |
| Invalid votes | 366 | 1.18 | +0.10 | | |
| Votes cast / turnout | 30,934 | 66.28 | +1.95 | | |
| Abstentions | 15,739 | 33.72 | −1.95 | | |
| Registered voters | 46,673 | | | | |
Sources
Footnotes: ^{1} People's Coalition results are compared to Democratic Coalition totals in the 1979 election.

=== Oviedo ===
Population: 184,473

← Summary of the 8 May 1983 City Council of Oviedo election results →
| Parties and alliances | Popular vote | | | Seats | |
| Parties and alliances | Votes | % | ±pp | Total | +/− |
|---|---|---|---|---|---|
| Spanish Socialist Workers' Party (PSOE) | 40,728 | 44.70 | +6.00 | 13 | +2 |
| People's Coalition (AP–PDP–UL)^{1} | 39,727 | 43.60 | +36.29 | 13 | +11 |
| Communist Party of Spain (PCE) | 5,673 | 6.23 | −3.90 | 1 | −1 |
| Democratic and Social Centre (CDS) | 3,471 | 3.81 | New | 0 | ±0 |
| Independents (INDEP) | 1,513 | 1.66 | New | 0 | ±0 |
| Union of the Democratic Centre (UCD) | n/a | n/a | −40.96 | 0 | −12 |
| Blank ballots | 0 | 0.00 | ±0.00 | | |
| Total | 91,112 | | | 27 | ±0 |
| Valid votes | 91,112 | 98.03 | −1.19 | | |
| Invalid votes | 1,828 | 1.97 | +1.19 | | |
| Votes cast / turnout | 92,940 | 65.60 | +8.89 | | |
| Abstentions | 48,740 | 34.40 | −8.89 | | |
| Registered voters | 141,680 | | | | |
Sources
Footnotes: ^{1} People's Coalition results are compared to Democratic Coalition totals in the 1979 election.

=== San Martín del Rey Aurelio ===
Population: 25,761

← Summary of the 8 May 1983 City Council of San Martín del Rey Aurelio election results →
| Parties and alliances | Popular vote | | | Seats | |
| Parties and alliances | Votes | % | ±pp | Total | +/− |
|---|---|---|---|---|---|
| Spanish Socialist Workers' Party (PSOE) | 8,463 | 60.30 | +10.08 | 13 | +2 |
| Communist Party of Spain (PCE) | 3,352 | 23.88 | −6.45 | 5 | −2 |
| People's Coalition (AP–PDP–UL)^{1} | 2,219 | 15.81 | +12.70 | 3 | +3 |
| Union of the Democratic Centre (UCD) | n/a | n/a | −15.93 | 0 | −3 |
| Blank ballots | 0 | 0.00 | ±0.00 | | |
| Total | 14,034 | | | 21 | ±0 |
| Valid votes | 14,034 | 98.55 | −0.51 | | |
| Invalid votes | 206 | 1.45 | +0.51 | | |
| Votes cast / turnout | 14,240 | 69.15 | +7.53 | | |
| Abstentions | 6,354 | 30.85 | −7.53 | | |
| Registered voters | 20,594 | | | | |
Sources
Footnotes: ^{1} People's Coalition results are compared to Democratic Coalition totals in the 1979 election.

=== Siero ===
Population: 40,350

← Summary of the 8 May 1983 City Council of Siero election results →
| Parties and alliances | Popular vote | | | Seats | |
| Parties and alliances | Votes | % | ±pp | Total | +/− |
|---|---|---|---|---|---|
| Spanish Socialist Workers' Party (PSOE) | 11,974 | 63.07 | +20.89 | 14 | +5 |
| People's Coalition (AP–PDP–UL) | 4,042 | 21.29 | New | 4 | +4 |
| Communist Party of Spain (PCE) | 1,857 | 9.78 | −8.04 | 2 | −2 |
| Independents (INDEP) | 1,111 | 5.85 | New | 1 | +1 |
| Union of the Democratic Centre (UCD) | n/a | n/a | −38.19 | 0 | −8 |
| Blank ballots | 0 | 0.00 | ±0.00 | | |
| Total | 18,984 | | | 21 | ±0 |
| Valid votes | 18,984 | 98.85 | +0.02 | | |
| Invalid votes | 220 | 1.15 | −0.02 | | |
| Votes cast / turnout | 19,204 | 61.36 | +4.35 | | |
| Abstentions | 12,092 | 38.64 | −4.35 | | |
| Registered voters | 31,296 | | | | |

== See also ==
- 1983 Asturian regional election
