= 1982 Spanish general election =

- 28 October 1982

All 350 seats in the Congress of Deputies and 208 (of 254) seats in the Senate 176 (Note: Given that HB deputies did not usually take their seats, the number of deputies needed for a majority was in practice slightly lower. HB won 2 seats, meaning a practical majority required at least 175 seats.) seats needed for a majority in the Congress of Deputies
- Opinion polls
- Registered: 26,846,940 ▲0.0%
- Turnout: 21,469,274 (80.0%) ▲12.0 pp
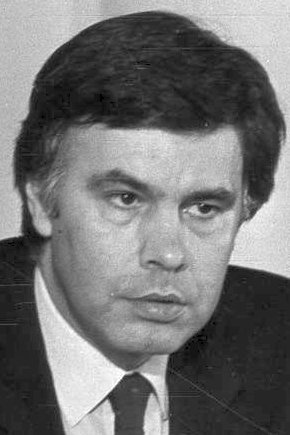

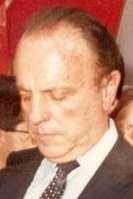

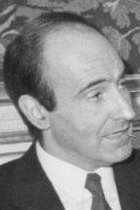

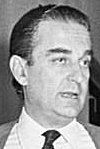

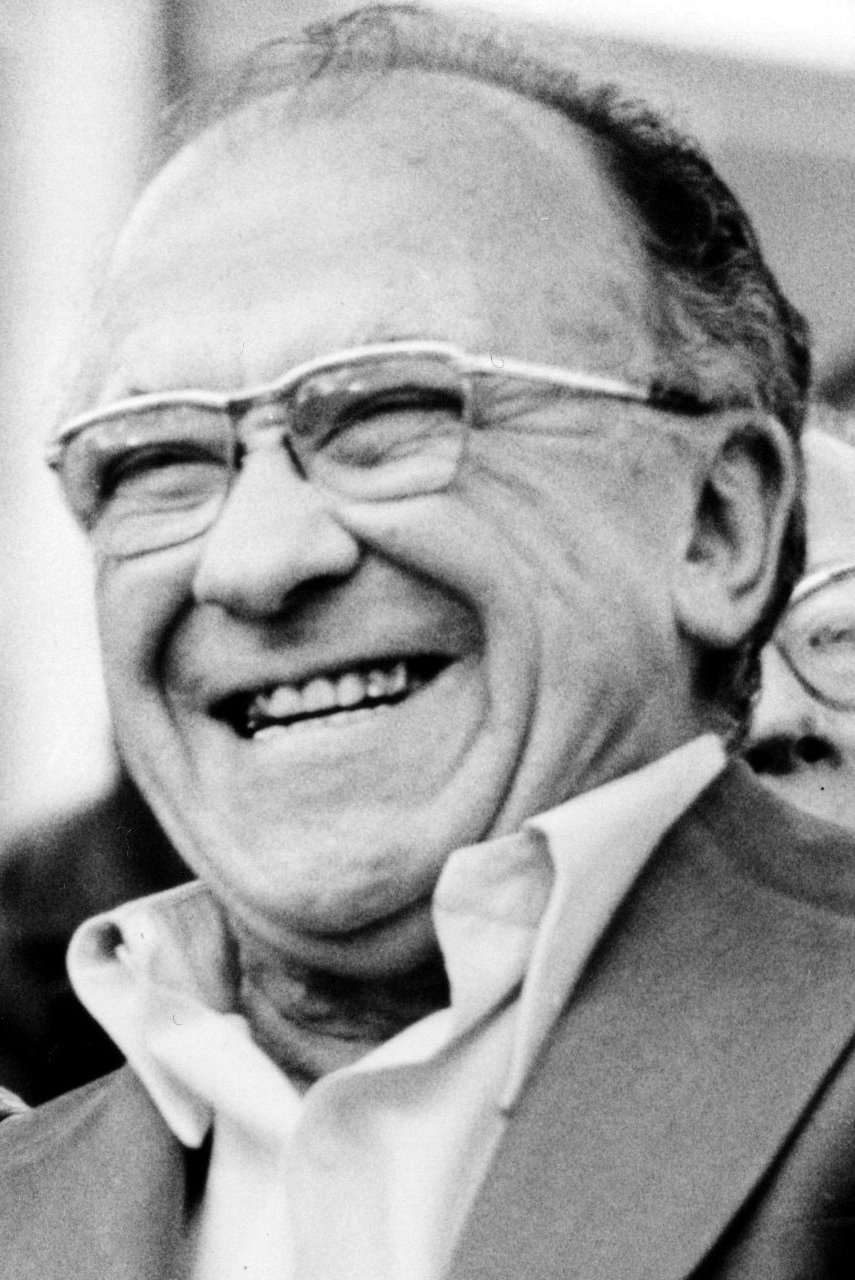
| | First party | Second party | Third party |
|---|---|---|---|
| Leader | Felipe González | Manuel Fraga | Miquel Roca |
| Party | PSOE | AP–PDP | CiU |
| Leader since | 28 September 1979 | 9 October 1976 | 4 July 1982 |
| Leader's seat | Madrid | Madrid | Barcelona |
| Last election | 121 seats, 30.4% | 16 seats, 7.4% (Note: Results for CD (6.1%, 9 deputies), UCD in the Basque Country (0.9%, 5 deputies), PAR (0.2%, 1 deputy) and UPN (0.2%, 1 deputy) in the 1979 Congress election.) | 8 seats, 2.7% |
| Seats won | 202 | 107 | 12 |
| Seat change | ▲81 | ▲91 | ▲4 |
| Popular vote | 10,127,392 | 5,548,108 | 772,726 |
| Percentage | 48.1% | 26.4% | 3.7% |
| Swing | ▲17.7 pp | ▲19.0 pp | ▲1.0 pp |
| | Fourth party | Fifth party | Sixth party |
| Leader | Landelino Lavilla | Íñigo Aguirre | Santiago Carrillo |
| Party | UCD | EAJ/PNV | PCE |
| Leader since | 13 July 1982 | 1 February 1980 | 3 July 1960 |
| Leader's seat | Madrid | Biscay | Madrid |
| Last election | 163 seats, 33.9% (Note: Results for UCD in the 1979 election, not including the Basque Country.) | 7 seats, 1.6% | 23 seats, 10.8% |
| Seats won | 11 | 8 | 4 |
| Seat change | ▼152 | ▲1 | ▼19 |
| Popular vote | 1,425,094 | 395,656 | 865,272 |
| Percentage | 6.8% | 1.9% | 4.1% |
| Swing | ▼27.1 pp | ▲0.3 pp | ▼6.7 pp |
Prime Minister before election
Leopoldo Calvo-Sotelo
UCD
Prime Minister after election
Felipe González
PSOE

A general election was held in Spain on 28 October 1982 to elect the members of the 2nd Cortes Generales under the Spanish Constitution of 1978. All 350 seats in the Congress of Deputies were up for election, as well as 208 of 254 seats in the Senate.

The election was called several months ahead of schedule by Prime Minister Leopoldo Calvo-Sotelo, amid poor polling ratings and severe infighting within the ruling Union of the Democratic Centre (UCD) party, which had seen the splits of former prime minister Adolfo Suárez's Democratic and Social Centre (CDS), Óscar Alzaga's People's Democratic Party (PDP), and the Democratic Action Party (PAD) of former justice minister Francisco Fernández Ordóñez. Government instability, the effects of an economic downturn resulting from the 1979 oil crisis and spiralling violence from terrorist attacks had characterized the legislative term. Suárez himself had resigned as prime minister in January 1981, two coup attempts were thwarted—one during Calvo-Sotelo's investiture on 23 February 1981, and another one on election eve—and the administrative set up of the so-called "state of autonomies" saw the UCD becoming increasingly isolated, particularly following its failure in opposing Andalusia's bid to attain autonomy through the "fast-track" route envisaged in the Constitution. A toxic oil syndrome outbreak in 1981, whose origin was traced to the illegal marketing of contaminated rapeseed oil, further undermined the UCD's position. Calvo-Sotelo himself had chosen not to seek re-election, being replaced as party nominee by the president of the Congress of Deputies, Landelino Lavilla.

The opposition Spanish Socialist Workers' Party (PSOE) led by Felipe González was able to present itself as a viable government alternative in the years going into the election, having renounced Marxism as an ideology in a party congress held in 1979, and achieving a political stunt through the tabling of a motion of no confidence in May 1980 that allowed González to broadcast his political programme live. The People's Alliance (AP) of former Francoist minister Manuel Fraga pursued a "natural majority" strategy, aimed at uniting the Spanish right-of-centre electorate around his party by taking advantage of the UCD decline. Meanwhile, the Communist Party of Spain (PCE) under Santiago Carrillo underwent an internal crisis over both ideological and personal reasons that led to the expulsion of a number of relevant members.

Amid the highest voter turnout recorded in a general election in Spain as of 2026, the PSOE won the largest landslide victory since the Spanish transition to democracy—with an overall majority of 202 out of 350 seats in the Congress and over ten million votes—by running a mainstream modern social democratic campaign and appealing to political change. The UCD was decimated, losing 93% of its previous seats and roughly 80% of its vote, in the worst defeat for a sitting government in Spain and one of the worst defeats ever suffered by a governing party in the Western world. AP benefitted from the UCD collapse and became the main opposition party to the Socialists with 107 seats. Adolfo Suárez's CDS had a modest performance with two Congress seats, while the PCE plummeted as it suffered from tactical voting to the PSOE. González took office on 2 December, heading the first government in 43 years in which none of its members had served under Franco.

== Background ==
The victory of the Union of the Democratic Centre (UCD) in the 1979 general election allowed Prime Minister Adolfo Suárez to form a new cabinet, whose main goal was to develop the "state of autonomies" envisaged in the newly approved Spanish Constitution of 1978. Subsequently, in April 1979, the first democratic local elections since the Second Spanish Republic saw the UCD emerging as the largest party overall, but losing control of the main urban centers to left-wing administrations formed by the Spanish Socialist Workers' Party (PSOE) and the Communist Party of Spain (PCE).

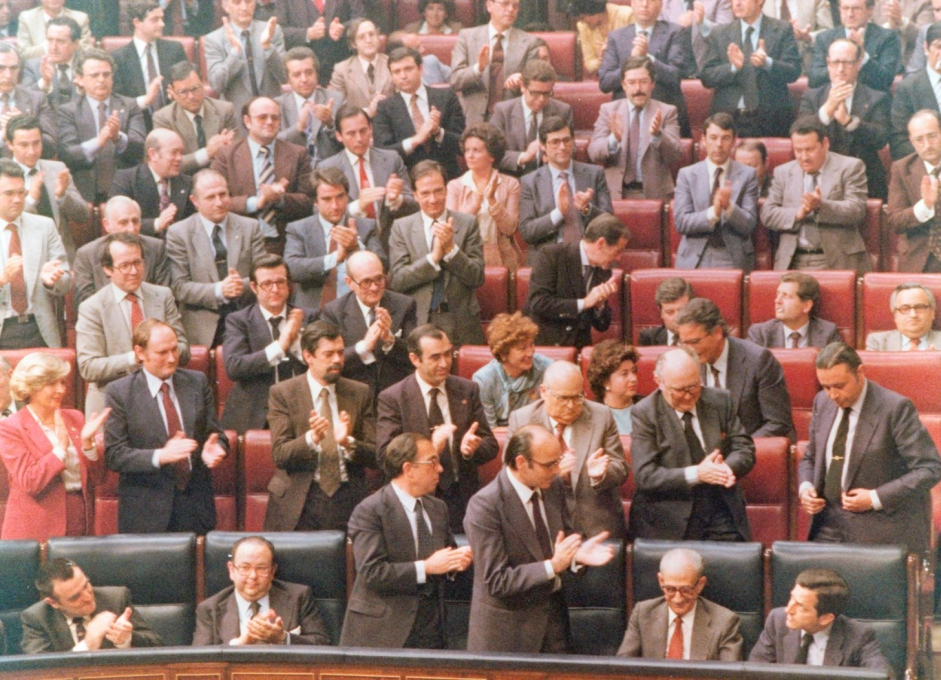
Prime Minister Adolfo Suárez (seated bottom right) during the parliamentary debate on 21 May 1980 in which a motion of no confidence was announced by PSOE leader Felipe González.

The economic situation had worsened as a result of the 1979 oil crisis and an increase in oil barrel prices, with inflation remaining steady at 15%, public deficit soaring to 6% of GDP, a sharp increase in unemployment, and the country's current account registering a net deficit of $5 billion by 1980. This period also saw increased terror activity from various groups, such as ETA, ETA(pm), the GRAPO and far-right gangs such as the Triple A or the Spanish Basque Battalion, seeing the California 47 bombing, the July 1979 Madrid bombings, the Ispaster attack or the Zarautz attack, among others. Concurrently, the end of the political consensus of the Transition period saw the opposition PSOE under Felipe González moving away from Marxism and embraced a market economy in a party congress in September 1979, as well as the launch of a tough opposition campaign which saw a motion of no confidence being tabled against the government in May 1980. While arithmetically unsuccessful, the motion's outcome was regarded as a political victory for González as it allowed him to broadcast his programme live while highlighting Suárez's parliamentary isolation, strengthening the PSOE's role as a credible government alternative.

The process for the establishment of the autonomous communities saw the provisional government of Andalusia under Rafael Escuredo request the "fast-track route" for autonomy access which, while allowing for immediate assumption of regional powers, was initially envisaged only for the three "historical nationalities" of Catalonia, the Basque Country and Galicia. A referendum on the autonomy initiative in February 1980 saw the "Yes" choice reaching the required threshold in all Andalusian provinces but Almería, causing a political deadlock of several months until an inter-party agreement was reached. Such agreement provided for Andalusia to be allowed autonomy access under the "fast-track" route, on the condition that all other regions—except for Navarre, the Canary Islands and the Valencian Community, which followed their own specific procedures—submitted themselves to the "slow-track" procedure; in exchange, all future autonomous communities would be allowed a parliamentary system with all institutions of self-government. The Spanish government's opposition to Andalusia "fast-tracking" to autonomy destroyed the UCD's popularity in the region, the most populous in Spain, never to recover.

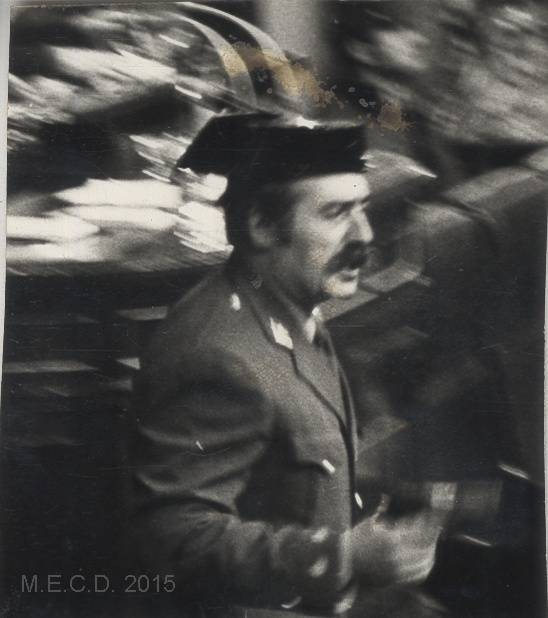
Antonio Tejero in the Congress of Deputies, during the coup attempt of 23 February 1981.

Growing divisions within the UCD—a result of the complex amalgamation of forces of very varying ideologies (social democrats, conservatives, liberals and christian democrats) into a party of power—gradually undermined Suárez's standing. Falling approval ratings and political differences plunged the party into an internal decomposition process which could be seen in legislative issues such as divorce; this, coupled with the loss of internal support and a deteriorating relationship with King Juan Carlos I, ultimately led to Suárez tendering his resignation as both prime minister and UCD leader on 29 January 1981. The investiture of his successor—the then second deputy prime minister and economy minister, Leopoldo Calvo-Sotelo—was disrupted by a coup attempt on 23 February from rogue military elements under Antonio Tejero, Jaime Milans del Bosch and Alfonso Armada, which failed due to a lack of support from the King and the Spanish Armed Forces at large. Calvo-Sotelo was ultimately elected two days later in the second ballot of investiture.

The tenure of Calvo-Sotelo's government was plagued by several events which further undermined the UCD's position: the toxic oil syndrome outbreak of 1981, affecting over 20,000 people and traced to the illegal marketing of contaminated rapeseed oil; the final approval of the divorce law amid criticisms from the Catholic Church and conservative party elements; the split of the newly-formed Democratic Action Party (PAD) under former justice minister Francisco Fernández Ordóñez; and Spain's entry into NATO being met with the staunch opposition of the parliamentary left, headed by González's PSOE. The opposition People's Alliance (AP), under former Francoist minister Manuel Fraga, advocated a union of the centre-right—the "natural majority" strategy—which, following the UCD's surprise defeat in the 1981 Galician regional election, turned into a bid to take over the entire right-of-centre electorate.

The PSOE landslide in the 1982 Andalusian regional election was a fatal blow to the UCD: from that point onwards, it was relegated to third party status in national opinion polls behind both PSOE and AP, leading to the party imploding and Calvo-Sotelo announcing his intention not to seek re-election in July 1982. Former prime minister Suárez announced the creation of a new centrist party, the Democratic and Social Centre (CDS), while deputy Óscar Alzaga formed the christian democrat People's Democratic Party (PDP) to run in an electoral alliance with AP. The mounting splits and defections throughout the summer of 1982 would have deprived the UCD government of a working majority upon the Cortes's reopening following the holiday recess, leading Calvo-Sotelo to dissolve parliament and call a snap election for 28 October 1982. The parliament's dissolution was criticized as it delayed the approval of the autonomy statutes for Madrid, the Balearic Islands, Castile and León, and Extremadura, as well as the 1983 General State Budget.

== Overview ==
Under the 1978 Constitution, the Spanish Cortes Generales were conceived as an imperfect bicameral system. The Congress of Deputies held greater legislative power than the Senate, having the ability to grant or withdraw confidence from a prime minister and to override Senate vetoes by an absolute majority. Nonetheless, the Senate retained a limited number of specific functions—such as ratifying international treaties, authorizing cooperation agreements between autonomous communities, enforcing direct rule, regulating interterritorial compensation funds, and taking part in constitutional amendments and in the appointment of members to the Constitutional Court and the General Council of the Judiciary—which were not subject to override by Congress. The electoral and procedural rules were the same as those used in the 1977 election.

=== Date ===
The term of each chamber of the Cortes Generales—the Congress and the Senate—expired four years from the date of their previous election, unless they were dissolved earlier. The election decree was required to be issued after the expiration date of parliament, with election day taking place within from 55 to 60 days after the decree's publication in the Official State Gazette (BOE). The previous election was held on 1 March 1979, which meant that the chambers' terms would have expired on 1 March 1983, setting the latest possible date for election day on 30 April 1983.

The prime minister had the prerogative to propose the monarch to dissolve both chambers at any given time—either jointly or separately—and call a snap election, provided that no motion of no confidence was in process, no state of emergency was in force and that dissolution did not occur before one year after a previous one. Additionally, both chambers were to be dissolved and a new election called if an investiture process failed to elect a prime minister within a two-month period from the first ballot. Barring this exception, there was no constitutional requirement for simultaneous elections to the Congress and the Senate. Still, as of 2026, there has been no precedent of separate elections taking place under the 1978 Constitution.

The Cortes Generales were officially dissolved on 30 August 1982 with the publication of the corresponding decree in the BOE, setting election day for 28 October. Both chambers were scheduled to reconvene on 18 November. Since election day fell on a Thursday, it was declared a holiday.

=== Electoral system ===
Voting for each chamber of the Cortes Generales was based on universal suffrage, comprising all Spanish nationals over 18 years of age with full political rights.

The Congress of Deputies had a minimum of 300 and a maximum of 400 seats, with electoral provisions fixing its size at 350. Of these, 348 were elected in 50 multi-member constituencies corresponding to the provinces of Spain—each of which was assigned an initial minimum of two seats and the remaining 248 distributed in proportion to population, roughly one seat per 144,500 inhabitants or fraction above 70,000—using the D'Hondt method and closed-list proportional voting, with a three percent-threshold of valid votes (including blank ballots) in each constituency. The remaining two seats were allocated to Ceuta and Melilla as single-member districts elected by plurality voting. The use of this electoral method resulted in a higher effective threshold depending on district magnitude and vote distribution.

As a result of the aforementioned allocation, each Congress multi-member constituency was entitled the following seats:

| Seats | Constituencies (Note: The province of Logroño was officially renamed as "La Rioja" on 23 November 1980. The province of Santander was officially renamed as "Cantabria" on 31 January 1982.) |
|---|---|
| 33 | Barcelona |
| 32 | Madrid |
| 15 | Valencia |
| 12 | Seville |
| 10 | Biscay, Oviedo |
| 9 | Alicante, La Coruña |
| 8 | Cádiz, Málaga, Murcia, Pontevedra, Zaragoza |
| 7 | Badajoz, Córdoba, Granada, Guipúzcoa, Jaén, Santa Cruz de Tenerife |
| 6 | Balearics, Las Palmas, León |
| 5 | Almería, Cáceres, Cantabria, Castellón, Ciudad Real, Gerona, Huelva, Lugo, Navarre, Orense, Tarragona, Toledo, Valladolid |
| 4 | Álava, Albacete, Burgos, Cuenca, La Rioja, Lérida, Salamanca, Zamora |
| 3 | Ávila, Guadalajara, Huesca, Palencia, Segovia, Soria, Teruel |

208 Senate seats were elected using open-list (Note: Parties could group candidates into lists, although each candidate was treated separately for the purpose of the voting procedure.) partial block voting: voters in constituencies electing four seats could choose up to three candidates; in those with two or three seats, up to two; and in single-member districts, one. Each of the 47 peninsular provinces was allocated four seats, while in insular provinces—such as the Balearic and Canary Islands—the districts were the islands themselves, with the larger ones (Mallorca, Gran Canaria and Tenerife) being allocated three seats each, and the smaller ones (Menorca, Ibiza–Formentera, Fuerteventura, La Gomera, El Hierro, Lanzarote and La Palma) one each. Ceuta and Melilla elected two seats each. Additionally, autonomous communities could appoint at least one senator each and were entitled to one additional senator for every million inhabitants.

The law provided for by-elections to fill vacant seats in the Congress only when results in a constituency were annulled by a final sentence following an electoral petition; otherwise, vacancies arising after the proclamation of candidates and during the legislative term were filled by the next candidates on the party lists or, when required, by designated substitutes. Additionally for the Senate, by-elections were required to fill any seat vacated within the first two years of the legislative term.

== Candidates ==
=== Nomination rules ===
Spanish citizens with the right to vote could run for election. Causes of ineligibility applied to the following officials:

- Holders of a number of senior public or institutional posts, including the heads and members of higher courts and state institutions; (Note: These comprised the Constitutional Court, the Supreme Court, the Council of State and the Court of Auditors.) the Ombudsman; high-ranking officials of government departments and other state agencies; government delegates in the autonomous communities and civil governors; members of electoral commissions; and the chairs of national trade unions;
- Judges and public prosecutors in active service;
- Members of the Armed Forces and law enforcement bodies in active service.

Other ineligibility provisions also applied to a number of territorial officials in these categories within their areas of jurisdiction.

Incompatibility rules included those of ineligibility (except for chairs of national trade unions), and also barred combining legislative roles (deputy and senator).

=== Parties and lists ===
The electoral law allowed for parties and federations registered in the interior ministry, alliances and groupings of electors to present lists of candidates. Parties and federations intending to form an alliance were required to inform the relevant electoral commission within 15 days of the election call, whereas groupings of electors needed to secure the signature of at least one permille—and, in any case, 500 signatures—of the electorate in the constituencies for which they sought election, disallowing electors from signing for more than one list.

Below is a list of the main parties and alliances which contested the election:

| Candidacy | Parties and alliances | Leading candidate | Ideology | Previous result | | | | Gov. | Ref. |
| Candidacy | Parties and alliances | Leading candidate | Ideology | Congress | | Senate | | Gov. | Ref. |
| Candidacy | Parties and alliances | Leading candidate | Ideology | Vote % | Seats | Vote % | Seats | Gov. | Ref. |
|---|---|---|---|---|---|---|---|---|---|
| UCD | List: Union of the Democratic Centre (UCD) | Landelino Lavilla | Centrism | 33.9% | 163 | 32.2% | 116 | Yes | |
| PSOE | List: Spanish Socialist Workers' Party (PSOE); Socialists' Party of Catalonia (PSC); Democratic Action Party (PAD) | Felipe González | Social democracy | 30.4% | 121 | 25.4% (Note: PSC–PSOE contested the 1979 Senate election within the Nova Entesa alliance.) | 68 | No | |
| PCE | List: Communist Party of Spain (PCE); Unified Socialist Party of Catalonia (PSUC); Canarian Assembly–Canarian Coordinator (AC–CC) | Santiago Carrillo | Eurocommunism | 10.8% | 23 | 12.4% (Note: Results for PCE (8.8%, 0 senators) and PSUC–PTC (3.6%, 1 senator) in the 1979 Senate election.) | 1 | No | |
| AP–PDP | List: People's Alliance (AP); People's Democratic Party (PDP); Liberal Democratic Party (PDL) (Note: In the Basque Country.); Union of the Democratic Centre (UCD); Navarrese People's Union (UPN); Regionalist Aragonese Party (PAR); Valencian Union (UV) | Manuel Fraga | Conservatism; Christian democracy | 7.4% | 16 | 7.8% (Note: Results for CD (5.8%, 3 senators), UCD in the Basque Country (1.0%, 2 senators), PAR (0.2%, 0 senators) and UPN (0.2%, 0 senators) in the 1979 Senate election.) | 5 | No | |
| CiU | List: Democratic Convergence of Catalonia (CDC); Democratic Union of Catalonia (UDC) | Miquel Roca | Catalan nationalism Centrism | 2.7% | 8 | Contested in alliance (Note: CiU and ERC contested the 1982 Senate election within the CiU–ERC alliance.) | | No | |
| EAJ/PNV | List: Basque Nationalist Party (EAJ/PNV) | Íñigo Aguirre | Basque nationalism Christian democracy | 1.6% | 7 | 1.7% | 8 | No | |
| PSA–PA | List: Socialist Party of Andalusia–Andalusian Party (PSA–PA) | Diego de los Santos | Andalusian nationalism Social democracy | 1.8% | 5 | 2.0% | 0 | No | |
| HB | List: People's Socialist Revolutionary Party (HASI); Basque Nationalist Action (EAE/ANV); Patriotic Socialist Committees (ASK) | Iñaki Esnaola | Basque independence Abertzale left Revolutionary socialism | 1.0% | 3 | 0.9% | 1 | No | |
| FN | List: New Force (FN) | Blas Piñar | Ultranationalism; National catholicism Francoism | 2.1% (Note: Results for UN in the 1979 election.) | 1 | 2.2% | 0 | No | |
| ERC | List: Republican Left of Catalonia (ERC) | Francesc Vicens | Catalan nationalism Left-wing nationalism Social democracy | 0.7% | 1 | Contested in alliance | | No | |
| EE | List: Basque Country Left–Left for Socialism (EE) | Juan María Bandrés | Basque nationalism Socialism | 0.5% | 1 | 0.4% | 0 | No | |
| UPC | List: Canarian People's Union (UPC) | Fernando Sagaseta | Canarian nationalism Socialism | 0.3% | 1 | 0.2% | 0 | No | |
| CiU–ERC | List: Democratic Convergence of Catalonia (CDC); Democratic Union of Catalonia (UDC); Republican Left of Catalonia (ERC) | Enric Jardí | Catalan nationalism | Did not contest | | 2.8% (Note: Results for CiU (2.8%, 1 senator) and ERC (within Nova Entesa, 2 senators) in the 1996 Senate election.) | 3 | No | |
| CDS | List: Democratic and Social Centre (CDS) | Adolfo Suárez | Centrism; Liberalism | Did not contest | | | | No | |

The possibility of a nationwide alliance between the UCD and AP was discussed, with the support of people from the business and banking world—concerned about a PSOE's victory with an absolute majority, as predicted by opinion polls—but this was rejected by Lavilla, who wished to appeal to the centre of the political spectrum and viewed AP as too right-wing for that purpose. Manuel Fraga was confident in that a "natural majority [a hypothetical union of the Spanish centre-right electorate] will be realized, either from above or from below". The only exception was in the Basque Country, where a UCD–AP alliance was confirmed at the regional level owing to the "exceptional circumstances" existing in the territory. A nationwide alliance between the UCD and the Liberal Democratic Party (PDL) of Antonio Garrigues Walker was initially confirmed—the PDL having itself been founded in July amid the UCD's internal crisis—but it broke down because of "technical differences" in the make up of electoral lists, with the PDL ultimately choosing to not run in the election. Some sectors within the UCD had also tried to ally themselves with Adolfo Suárez's CDS, with little success as a result of the latter's refusal. The UCD's general reluctance against any alliance in which it was not the dominant party was contested internally, as fears of it heading towards a major election rout increased.

The Democratic Action Party (PAD) of former justice minister Francisco Fernández Ordóñez reached an agreement to run under the PSOE banner, while talks for an eventual alliance between Óscar Alzaga's People's Democratic Party (PDP) and AP came to fruition by early September.

== Campaign ==
=== Party slogans ===
| Party or alliance | Original slogan | English translation | Ref. |
|---|---|---|---|
| UCD | « Landelino Lavilla responde » « Responde. Vota UCD. El Centro » | "Landelino Lavilla responds" "Respond. Vote UCD. The Centre" | |
| PSOE | « Por el cambio » | "For change" | |
| PCE | « Para que nada se pare » | "So that nothing stops" | |
| AP–PDP | « Es hora de soluciones » « Todos ganaremos con Fraga » « Es la hora de Fraga » | "It's time for solutions" "We shall all win with Fraga" "It's Fraga's time" | |
| CiU | « Catalunya, decisiva en Madrid » | "Catalonia, decisive in Madrid" | |
| CDS | « Como debe ser » « Asegurar el progreso » | "As it must be" "Ensuring progress" | |

=== Events and issues ===
The Union of the Democratic Centre tried to campaign focusing on the values of the centre against the alleged radicalism of the PSOE and AP, the two of them had begun to polarize the political scene by 1982.

Nonetheless, the UCD campaign was plagued by organizational problems. No proper campaign chief was named, the messages were varied and confusing and the economic waste, despite being the best-funded campaign, was deemed unaffordable given the electoral prospects. No attempt for simplification of the party's message was made; their proposals consisting of dense and long texts to the simpler and more effective slogans of the other parties. Incumbent Prime Minister Leopoldo Calvo-Sotelo was mostly left out from the party campaign, and defections to other parties as well as the refusal to form a broad centre-right coalition with AP had left the UCD in a weak position to voters. Landelino Lavilla was also deemed to have poor public performances: in an opinion article published during the campaign on the Cambio 16 magazine it was noted how Lavilla's speeches were unable to incite any euphoria or to make clear any ideas.

Overall, the party campaign was criticised as having been carried out with reluctance and lack of conviction.

The slogan used by PSOE during the campaign, which was used in conjunction with posters of Felipe González staring at a blue sky; both the slogan and the posters became symbols of the González era and of Spanish political communication.

The Spanish Socialist Workers' Party centered its campaign on the perceived need for a political change in the Spanish government. Unlike the 1977 and 1979 campaigns, the PSOE resorted to a catch-all party strategy, presenting itself as the "only effective alternative to UCD". It used a single, simple and catchy slogan ("For change"), meant to simplify the party's message as well as to transmit confidence in the new government. Raised fists and singing of The Internationale also disappeared from PSOE's rallies. Instead, seeking to move away from its traditional left-wing stance and to appeal to a broader electorate through a more centrist platform, the party usually ended its rallies with a jingle ("We must change") centering on the message of "change". The PSOE also relied in a strong personalization around the figure of Felipe González, appealing to ethics and messages of hope as drivers of the political change, but also to show an image of party unity in contrast to the UCD's internal infighting of the previous years. The party's final campaign rally on 26 October, held in the University City of Madrid, was estimated to have gathered roughly half a million people.

Among the PSOE election pledges were the creation of 800,000 employments, the nationalization of banks in a critical economic situation and the decrease of retirement age from 69 to 64, as well as to establish the maximum working time at 40-hour week. It also proposed a wide range of social policies: raising taxes to higher incomes, increasing lowest-earning pensions, promotion of public companies, to increase control and monitoring of companies by workers, to expand unemployment insurances and to reduce social inequality through the social security. Regarding NATO, the PSOE was also a staunch advocate of Spain's exit from the organization, though eventually it would defend a 'Yes' vote in the 1986 referendum on NATO membership.

Leading all opinion polls and fresh from its success in the May Andalusian regional election, the PSOE was widely expected to win the election; its victory being so assured that all other parties' efforts were directed towards avoiding a Socialist absolute majority so that it had to govern through coalitions or agreements, rather than in winning the election themselves.

The People's Alliance and the People's Democratic Party ran in a common ticket for this election, in what would be a foreshadowing of the future People's Coalition from 1983 to 1986. The coalition's communication strategy for the campaign revolved around two main ideas: emphasis on Manuel Fraga's leadership and in the coalition as the only viable alternative to the PSOE. The coalition strategy was also meant to present itself as an example of political cooperation, contrasting with UCD's disintegration. All in all, the purpose of the AP–PDP ticket was to turn itself into the main centre-right reference force of Spain. Manuel Fraga was also concerned in moderating his right-wing stance, avoiding themes such as death penalty or constitutional reform.

Among AP's election pledges were a tax reduction consisting in the suppression of the wealth tax, exemption from the income tax (IRPF) for incomes lower than 750,000 yearly pesetas, deduction of any economic amount intended for productive investments and the setting of an upper limit to individual tax burden. It also proposed the political immunity of Administration officials against successive government changes and a partial privatization of the social security system so that only the most basic levels of attendance would be maintained generally, with other benefits depending on what users paid (but providing extensions for the person attending home in each family and to young people unable to find employment after completing their studies). Finally, it advocated for completing the integration of Spain into NATO, ensuring full employment and to guide the cultural policy under christian humanism.

After its success in the 1981 Galician and 1982 Andalusian regional elections, all opinion polls pointed to AP becoming the main Spanish opposition party, but at a great distance from the PSOE.

During the first days of October, preparations for a coup d'etat attempt scheduled for 27 October (on election day's eve) were unveiled and foiled. The plan was to stage a number of violent actions against different personalities, to culminate later with a great explosion in a block of military houses in Madrid. This would be blamed on ETA and the inefficiency in the fight against terrorism as a means to justify a military takeover. The importance of the coup attempt was downplayed by the media in order to avoid raising social unrest, and it hardly affected the election campaign starting on 7 October. PSOE Vice Secretary-General Alfonso Guerra, however, would state that the incorporation of the Army to democracy was to be one of the goals of a future PSOE government.

== Results ==
=== Congress of Deputies ===
← Summary of the 28 October 1982 Congress of Deputies election results →
| Parties and alliances | Popular vote | | | Seats | |
| Parties and alliances | Votes | % | ±pp | Total | +/− |
|---|---|---|---|---|---|
| Spanish Socialist Workers' Party (PSOE) | 10,127,392 | 48.11 | +17.71 | 202 | +81 |
| People's Alliance–People's Democratic Party (AP–PDP)^{1} | 5,548,107 | 26.36 | +18.97 | 107 | +91 |
| Union of the Democratic Centre (UCD)^{2} | 1,425,093 | 6.77 | −27.14 | 11 | −152 |
| Communist Party of Spain (PCE) | 865,272 | 4.11 | −6.66 | 4 | −19 |
| Communist Party of Spain (PCE) | 846,515 | 4.02 | −6.75 | 4 | −19 |
| Canarian Assembly–Canarian Coordinator (AC–CC) | 18,757 | 0.09 | New | 0 | ±0 |
| Convergence and Union (CiU) | 772,726 | 3.67 | +0.98 | 12 | +4 |
| Democratic and Social Centre (CDS) | 604,309 | 2.87 | New | 2 | +2 |
| Basque Nationalist Party (EAJ/PNV) | 395,656 | 1.88 | +0.23 | 8 | +1 |
| Popular Unity (HB) | 210,601 | 1.00 | +0.04 | 2 | −1 |
| Republican Left of Catalonia (ERC) | 138,118 | 0.66 | −0.03 | 1 | ±0 |
| New Force (FN)^{3} | 108,746 | 0.52 | −1.59 | 0 | −1 |
| Workers' Socialist Party (PST) | 103,133 | 0.49 | New | 0 | ±0 |
| Basque Country Left–Left for Socialism (EE) | 100,326 | 0.48 | ±0.00 | 1 | ±0 |
| Socialist Party of Andalusia–Andalusian Party (PSA–PA) | 84,474 | 0.40 | −1.41 | 0 | −5 |
| Party of the Communists of Catalonia (PCC) | 47,249 | 0.22 | New | 0 | ±0 |
| Galician Nationalist Bloc–Galician Socialist Party (B–PSG)^{4} | 38,437 | 0.18 | −0.47 | 0 | ±0 |
| Canarian People's Union (UPC) | 35,013 | 0.17 | −0.16 | 0 | −1 |
| Left Nationalists (NE) | 30,643 | 0.15 | New | 0 | ±0 |
| Spanish Solidarity (SE) | 28,451 | 0.14 | New | 0 | ±0 |
| United Extremadura (EU) | 26,148 | 0.12 | New | 0 | ±0 |
| Spanish Communist Workers' Party (PCOE) | 25,830 | 0.12 | New | 0 | ±0 |
| Canarian Convergence (CC) | 25,792 | 0.12 | New | 0 | ±0 |
| Communist Unification of Spain (UCE) | 24,044 | 0.11 | −0.16 | 0 | ±0 |
| Communist Party of Spain (Marxist–Leninist) (PCE (m–l)) | 23,186 | 0.11 | New | 0 | ±0 |
| Galician Left (EG) | 22,192 | 0.11 | New | 0 | ±0 |
| Valencian People's Union (UPV)^{5} | 18,516 | 0.09 | +0.01 | 0 | ±0 |
| Communist Unity Candidacy (CUC)^{6} | 15,632 | 0.07 | −0.20 | 0 | ±0 |
| United Left of the Valencian Country (EUPV) | 9,302 | 0.04 | New | 0 | ±0 |
| Falangist Movement of Spain (MFE) | 8,976 | 0.04 | +0.04 | 0 | ±0 |
| Agrarian Bloc Electoral Group (AEBA) | 8,748 | 0.04 | New | 0 | ±0 |
| Socialist Party of Mallorca–Nationalists of the Islands (PSM) | 8,633 | 0.04 | −0.02 | 0 | ±0 |
| Socialist Party of Aragon (PSAr)^{7} | 6,861 | 0.03 | −0.08 | 0 | ±0 |
| Valencian Nationalist Left (ENV–URV)^{8} | 6,738 | 0.03 | −0.06 | 0 | ±0 |
| Communist Left (LCR–MC)^{9} | 6,415 | 0.03 | −0.64 | 0 | ±0 |
| Socialist Party (PS)^{10} | 6,375 | 0.03 | −0.71 | 0 | ±0 |
| Independent Galician Electoral Group (AEGI) | 5,512 | 0.03 | New | 0 | ±0 |
| Communist League–Internationalist Socialist Workers' Coalition (LC (COSI)) | 5,462 | 0.03 | +0.01 | 0 | ±0 |
| Communist Left Front (FIC) | 3,772 | 0.02 | New | 0 | ±0 |
| Canarian Nationalist Party (PNC) | 3,257 | 0.02 | New | 0 | ±0 |
| Regionalist Party of the Leonese Country (PREPAL) | 3,234 | 0.02 | New | 0 | ±0 |
| Conservatives of Catalonia (CiC) | 2,596 | 0.01 | New | 0 | ±0 |
| Spanish Phalanx of the CNSO (FE–JONS) | 2,528 | 0.01 | New | 0 | ±0 |
| Liberal Democratic Asturian Party (PADL) | 2,493 | 0.01 | New | 0 | ±0 |
| Galician Independents and Migrants (IDG) | 2,236 | 0.01 | New | 0 | ±0 |
| Spanish Ruralist Party (PRE) | 1,984 | 0.01 | −0.05 | 0 | ±0 |
| Independent Spanish Phalanx (FEI) | 1,862 | 0.01 | New | 0 | ±0 |
| Nationalist Party of Ceuta (PNCe) | 1,785 | 0.01 | New | 0 | ±0 |
| Independent Citizen Group (ACI) | 1,710 | 0.01 | New | 0 | ±0 |
| Spanish Catholic Movement (MCE) | 1,694 | 0.01 | New | 0 | ±0 |
| Party of El Bierzo (PB) | 1,454 | 0.01 | New | 0 | ±0 |
| Canarian Social Democratic Association (ASDC) | 1,131 | 0.01 | New | 0 | ±0 |
| Republican Left (IR) | 610 | 0.00 | −0.31 | 0 | ±0 |
| Asturian Falange (FA) | 532 | 0.00 | New | 0 | ±0 |
| Carlist Party (PC) | 224 | 0.00 | −0.28 | 0 | ±0 |
| Spanish Agrarian Party (PAE) | 222 | 0.00 | New | 0 | ±0 |
| Proverist Party (PPr) | 168 | 0.00 | −0.03 | 0 | ±0 |
| Riojan Left Coordinator (CIR) | 0 | 0.00 | New | 0 | ±0 |
| United Canarian People (PCU) | 0 | 0.00 | New | 0 | ±0 |
| Majorcan Left (EM) | 0 | 0.00 | New | 0 | ±0 |
| Asturian Left Bloc (BIA) | 0 | 0.00 | New | 0 | ±0 |
| Blank ballots | 98,438 | 0.47 | +0.15 | | |
| Total | 21,050,038 | | | 350 | ±0 |
| Valid votes | 21,050,038 | 98.05 | −0.48 | | |
| Invalid votes | 419,236 | 1.95 | +0.48 | | |
| Votes cast / turnout | 21,469,274 | 79.97 | +11.93 | | |
| Abstentions | 5,377,666 | 20.03 | −11.93 | | |
| Registered voters | 26,846,940 | | | | |
Sources
Footnotes: ^{1} People's Alliance–People's Democratic Party results are compared to the combined totals of Democratic Coalition, Navarrese People's Union, Regionalist Aragonese Party and Union of the Democratic Centre in the Basque Country in the 1979 election.; ^{2} Union of the Democratic Centre does not include results in the Basque Country.; ^{3} New Force results are compared to National Union totals in the 1979 election.; ^{4} Galician Nationalist Bloc–Galician Socialist Party results are compared to the combined totals of the Galician National-Popular Bloc and Galician Unity in the 1979 election.; ^{5} Valencian People's Union results are compared to Nationalist Party of the Valencian Country totals in the 1979 election.; ^{6} Communist Unity Candidacy results are compared to Workers' Communist Party totals in the 1979 election.; ^{7} Socialist Party of Aragon results are compared to Coalition for Aragon totals in the 1979 election.; ^{8} Valencian Nationalist Left results are compared to Valencian Regional Union totals in the 1979 election.; ^{9} Communist Left results are compared to the combined totals of Communist Movement–Organization of Communist Left and Revolutionary Communist League in the 1979 election.; ^{10} Socialist Party results are compared to Spanish Socialist Workers' Party (historical) totals in the 1979 election.

Popular vote
| PSOE | 48.11% |
| AP–PDP | 26.36% |
| UCD | 6.77% |
| PCE | 4.11% |
| CiU | 3.67% |
| CDS | 2.87% |
| EAJ/PNV | 1.88% |
| HB | 1.00% |
| ERC | 0.66% |
| EE | 0.48% |
| Others | 3.63% |
| Blank ballots | 0.47% |

Seats
| PSOE | 57.71% |
| AP–PDP | 30.57% |
| CiU | 3.43% |
| UCD | 3.14% |
| EAJ/PNV | 2.29% |
| PCE | 1.14% |
| CDS | 0.57% |
| HB | 0.57% |
| ERC | 0.29% |
| EE | 0.29% |

=== Senate ===
← Summary of the 28 October 1982 Senate of Spain election results →
| Parties and alliances | Popular vote | | | Seats | |
| Parties and alliances | Votes | % | ±pp | Total | +/− |
|---|---|---|---|---|---|
| Spanish Socialist Workers' Party (PSOE)^{1} | 27,954,856 | 47.60 | +22.19 | 134 | +66 |
| People's Alliance–People's Democratic Party (AP–PDP)^{2} | 15,084,392 | 25.68 | +17.89 | 54 | +49 |
| Union of the Democratic Centre (UCD)^{3} | 4,017,007 | 6.84 | −25.40 | 4 | −113 |
| Communist Party of Spain (PCE) | 2,687,352 | 4.58 | −7.85 | 0 | −1 |
| Communist Party of Spain (PCE)^{4} | 2,657,576 | 4.52 | −7.91 | 0 | −1 |
| Canarian Assembly–Canarian Coordinator (AC–CC) | 29,776 | 0.05 | New | 0 | ±0 |
| Catalonia in the Senate (CiU–ERC)^{5} | 2,503,525 | 4.26 | +1.50 | 7 | +4 |
| Democratic and Social Centre (CDS) | 1,748,765 | 2.98 | New | 0 | ±0 |
| Basque Nationalist Party (EAJ/PNV) | 1,171,730 | 2.00 | +0.32 | 7 | −1 |
| Popular Unity (HB) | 619,873 | 1.06 | +0.13 | 0 | −1 |
| New Force (FN)^{6} | 344,645 | 0.59 | −1.58 | 0 | ±0 |
| Basque Country Left–Left for Socialism (EE) | 293,173 | 0.50 | +0.08 | 0 | ±0 |
| Socialist Party of Andalusia–Andalusian Party (PSA–PA) | 292,496 | 0.50 | −1.54 | 0 | ±0 |
| Workers' Socialist Party (PST) | 277,291 | 0.47 | New | 0 | ±0 |
| Party of the Communists of Catalonia (PCC) | 187,958 | 0.32 | New | 0 | ±0 |
| Socialist Party (PS)^{7} | 125,516 | 0.21 | −0.15 | 0 | ±0 |
| Galician Nationalist Bloc–Galician Socialist Party (B–PSG)^{8} | 119,929 | 0.20 | −0.54 | 0 | ±0 |
| United Extremadura (EU) | 111,843 | 0.19 | New | 0 | ±0 |
| Spanish Solidarity (SE) | 102,019 | 0.17 | New | 0 | ±0 |
| Spanish Vertex Ecological Development Revindication (VERDE) | 92,452 | 0.16 | New | 0 | ±0 |
| Natural Culture (CN) | 90,992 | 0.15 | New | 0 | ±0 |
| Left Nationalists (NE) | 82,198 | 0.14 | New | 0 | ±0 |
| Galician Left (EG) | 73,300 | 0.12 | New | 0 | ±0 |
| Canarian People's Union (UPC) | 61,240 | 0.10 | −0.13 | 0 | ±0 |
| Canarian Convergence (CC) | 45,890 | 0.08 | New | 0 | ±0 |
| Valencian Nationalist Left (ENV–URV)^{9} | 41,778 | 0.07 | −0.16 | 0 | ±0 |
| Communist Left (LCR–MC)^{10} | 38,441 | 0.07 | −0.66 | 0 | ±0 |
| Falangist Movement of Spain (MFE) | 34,856 | 0.06 | −0.20 | 0 | ±0 |
| Agrarian Bloc Electoral Group (AEBA) | 29,147 | 0.05 | New | 0 | ±0 |
| Socialist Party of Mallorca–Nationalists of the Islands (PSM) | 22,272 | 0.04 | ±0.00 | 0 | ±0 |
| Independent (INDEP) | 22,227 | 0.04 | ±0.00 | 0 | −1 |
| Independent Spanish Phalanx (FEI) | 21,840 | 0.04 | New | 0 | ±0 |
| Regionalist Party of the Leonese Country (PREPAL) | 17,191 | 0.03 | New | 0 | ±0 |
| Group of Independent Electors (ADEI) | 17,009 | 0.03 | −0.10 | 1 | −2 |
| Communist Unity Candidacy (CUC)^{11} | 16,940 | 0.03 | −0.01 | 0 | ±0 |
| Independent Galician Electoral Group (AEGI) | 16,149 | 0.03 | New | 0 | ±0 |
| Communist Party of Spain (Marxist–Leninist) (PCE (m–l)) | 15,770 | 0.03 | New | 0 | ±0 |
| Democratic Party of the People (PDEP) | 14,939 | 0.03 | New | 0 | ±0 |
| Spanish Phalanx of the CNSO (FE–JONS) | 14,654 | 0.02 | New | 0 | ±0 |
| Independent National Party (PNI) | 14,161 | 0.02 | New | 0 | ±0 |
| Communist Unification of Spain (UCE) | 11,611 | 0.02 | −0.06 | 0 | ±0 |
| Spanish Ruralist Party (PRE) | 10,659 | 0.02 | −0.06 | 0 | ±0 |
| Galician Independents and Migrants (IDG) | 10,571 | 0.02 | New | 0 | ±0 |
| United Left of the Valencian Country (EUPV) | 9,809 | 0.02 | New | 0 | ±0 |
| Republican Left (IR) | 9,623 | 0.02 | −0.39 | 0 | ±0 |
| Rainbow Electoral Group (Arcoiris) | 7,910 | 0.01 | New | 0 | ±0 |
| Liberated Galiza (GC) | 7,792 | 0.01 | New | 0 | ±0 |
| Communist Left Front (FIC) | 7,626 | 0.01 | New | 0 | ±0 |
| Party of El Bierzo (PB) | 7,409 | 0.01 | New | 0 | ±0 |
| Independent (INDEP) | 7,356 | 0.01 | New | 0 | ±0 |
| Canarian Nationalist Party (PNC) | 7,180 | 0.01 | ±0.00 | 0 | ±0 |
| Majorera Assembly (AM) | 6,325 | 0.01 | ±0.00 | 1 | +1 |
| Socialist Party of Aragon (PSAr)^{12} | 5,993 | 0.01 | −0.09 | 0 | ±0 |
| Valencian People's Union (UPV) | 5,431 | 0.01 | New | 0 | ±0 |
| Nationalist Party of Ceuta (PNCe) | 4,644 | 0.01 | New | 0 | ±0 |
| Electors' Group (AE) | 4,575 | 0.01 | New | 0 | ±0 |
| Menorcan Independent Candidacy (CIM) | 4,259 | 0.01 | New | 0 | ±0 |
| Independent (INDEP) | 3,788 | 0.01 | New | 0 | ±0 |
| Proverist Party (PPr) | 1,016 | 0.00 | ±0.00 | 0 | ±0 |
| Asturian Falange (FA) | 643 | 0.00 | New | 0 | ±0 |
| Spanish Agrarian Party (PAE) | 578 | 0.00 | New | 0 | ±0 |
| Regionalist Party of Castile and León (PRCL) | 496 | 0.00 | New | 0 | ±0 |
| Canarian Social Democratic Association (ASDC) | 16 | 0.00 | New | 0 | ±0 |
| United Canarian People (PCU) | 0 | 0.00 | New | 0 | ±0 |
| Majorcan Left (EM) | 0 | 0.00 | New | 0 | ±0 |
| Independent Progressive (PI) | 0 | 0.00 | New | 0 | ±0 |
| Menorcan Progressive Candidacy (PSM–PSOE–PCIB–PTI) | n/a | n/a | −0.02 | 0 | −1 |
| Blank ballots (Note: The percentage of blank ballots is calculated over the official number of valid votes cast, irrespective of the total number of votes shown as a result of adding up the individual results for each party.) | 171,830 | 1.78 | +0.30 | | |
| Total | 58,732,956 | | | 208 | ±0 |
| Valid votes | | | | | |
| Invalid votes | 386,815 | | | | |
| Votes cast / turnout | | | | | |
| Abstentions | | | | | |
| Registered voters | 26,846,940 | | | | |
Sources
Footnotes: ^{1} Spanish Socialist Workers' Party includes Socialists' Party of Catalonia seat totals within the New Agreement alliance in the 1979 election.; ^{2} People's Alliance–People's Democratic Party results are compared to the combined totals of Democratic Coalition, Regionalist Aragonese Party, Navarrese People's Union and Union of the Democratic Centre in the Basque Country in the 1979 election.; ^{3} Union of the Democratic Centre does not include results in the Basque Country.; ^{4} Communist Party of Spain results are compared to the combined totals of Communist Party of Spain and For the Agreement in the 1979 election.; ^{5} Catalonia in the Senate results are compared to Convergence and Union totals in the 1979 election, including Republican Left of Catalonia seat totals within the New Agreement alliance.; ^{6} New Force results are compared to National Union totals in the 1979 election.; ^{7} Socialist Party results are compared to Spanish Socialist Workers' Party (historical) totals in the 1979 election.; ^{8} Galician Nationalist Bloc–Galician Socialist Party results are compared to the combined totals of the Galician National-Popular Bloc and Galician Unity in the 1979 election.; ^{9} Valencian Nationalist Left results are compared to Valencian Regional Union totals in the 1979 election.; ^{10} Communist Left results are compared to the combined totals of Communist Movement–Organization of Communist Left and Revolutionary Communist League in the 1979 election.; ^{11} Communist Unity Candidacy results are compared to Workers' Communist Party totals in the 1979 election.; ^{12} Socialist Party of Aragon results are compared to Coalition for Aragon totals in the 1979 election.

Popular vote
| PSOE | 47.60% |
| AP–PDP | 25.68% |
| UCD | 6.84% |
| PCE | 4.58% |
| CiU–ERC | 4.26% |
| CDS | 2.98% |
| EAJ/PNV | 2.00% |
| HB | 1.06% |
| ADEI | 0.03% |
| AM | 0.01% |
| Others | 4.68% |
| Blank ballots | 1.78% |

Seats
| PSOE | 64.42% |
| AP–PDP | 25.96% |
| CiU–ERC | 3.37% |
| EAJ/PNV | 3.37% |
| UCD | 1.92% |
| ADEI | 0.48% |
| AM | 0.48% |

=== Maps ===
Election results by constituency (Congress).

Vote winner strength by constituency (Congress).

Vote winner strength by autonomous community (Congress). (Note: This territorial division is based on the autonomic system established under the Spanish Constitution of 1978, as opposed to the regional division established in 1833. Most autonomous communities would be constituted by the time of the 1982 election, with the rest being established in early 1983. The autonomous cities of Ceuta and Melilla would not be constituted as independent administrative entities until 1995.)

== Aftermath ==
=== Outcome ===
With a record high turnout of 79.97%, the Spanish political landscape underwent an electoral earthquake. The ruling Union of the Democratic Centre (UCD) was devastated; it lost 157 seats and fell to 11, a 93.5% loss from 1979. In terms of votes, it went from 6.3 million down to 1.4 million, a loss of 4.9 million votes or 77.8% of its 1979 vote, and plunged to 6.8% of the share to the 34.8% it had won in 1979—a loss of 80.5% of its share. Of its 11 seats, 5 were obtained in Galicia, 3 in Castile and León, 2 in the Canary Islands and only 1 in Madrid, winning no seats in all other regions. Incumbent Prime Minister Leopoldo Calvo-Sotelo, who stood in second place in the Madrid list, lost his seat—the only time in recent Spanish history that a sitting prime minister seeking re-election as MP was unseated. It was the worst defeat, both in absolute terms and in terms of percentage of seats lost, for a ruling party at the national level in Spain, and one of the worst defeats ever suffered by a governing party in any country at the time, rivaling only with the collapse of Christian Democracy at the 1994 Italian election or the Progressive Conservatives' downfall at the 1993 Canadian election.

The Spanish Socialist Workers' Party (PSOE) swept the popular vote in nearly all regions of the country—only AP and PNV wins in Galicia and the Basque Country denied them a clean sweep of the entire national territory. They won a majority of seats in every region but Galicia, La Rioja and the Balearic Islands, and obtained an astounding 60% in Spain's most populous region, Andalusia—a feat never to happen again. In Catalonia it obtained a 23-point lead over the second most-voted party, a result that would only be surpassed by the PSOE's own result in the 2008 election. Andalusia and Catalonia would become from that point onwards as the main strongholds of PSOE support, which was to remain the dominant political force in both regions in each general election until 2011. Overall, the PSOE won 202 seats—its best historical performance and the best performance of any party in a Spanish general election. This gave them an overwhelming majority in the Congress, nearly doubling the seat-count of its immediate competitor. The PSOE was also the only party to win seats in every district, the first of only three times since the Spanish transition to democracy that this has happened—the other two being PP results in the 2000 and 2011 elections.

The People's Alliance–People's Democratic Party (AP–PDP) coalition had a major breakthrough, gaining a substantial portion of UCD previous support, displacing it as the main party to the right-of-centre in Spain and becoming the country's main opposition party. Despite only topping the polls in Galicia, its results elsewhere where still considered impressive for a party that, in the 1979 election, had only obtained 6% of the vote and 9 seats. It obtained 107 seats—despite opinion polls predicting that it would be well-below the 100-seat mark—and climbed up to 5.5 million votes. It did not win any seats, however, in the districts of Ceuta and Melilla, which essentially worked under a FPTP system. The AP-UCD-PDP coalition in the Basque Country won 2 seats, 1 each for Álava and Biscay, being left out from Gipuzkoa. It would also be the only one of three times that AP and its successor, the PP, would win a seat in the district of Girona.

The Communist Party of Spain (PCE) suffered from PSOE's growth, falling from 23 seats to 4—a loss of 82.6%—and losing 1.1 million votes to 850,000 —a loss of 60%. Furthermore, it fell to 4.02% of the share, from 10.8% in 1979. As a result of not reaching the required 5% threshold and 5 seats to obtain a parliamentary group in Congress of its own, the PCE was forced into the Mixed Group, with the fear of becoming an extraparliamentary party at the next election remaining for the entire legislature. On the other hand, nationalist parties such as PNV and CiU benefitted from the UCD's collapse and enlarged their political representation. CiU gained 4 seats for a total of 12, placing among the top two in Catalonia, a first in a general election since 1977.

=== Government formation ===
Investiture; Congress of Deputies; Nomination of Felipe González (PSOE)
| Ballot → | 1 December 1982 |
| Required majority → | 176 out of 350 |
| Yes: • PSOE (200); • PCE (4); • CDS (2); • EE (1) | 207 / 350 |
| No: • AP–PDP (104); • UCD (12) | 116 / 350 |
| Abstentions: • CiU (12); • PNV (8); • ERC (1) | 21 / 350 |
| Absentees: • AP–PDP (2); • HB (2); • PSOE (1) | 5 / 350 |

Congress Speaker Gregorio Peces-Barba (PSOE), in an uncommon gesture, did not cast a ballot and maintained strict neutrality, as his party's lopsized majority all but guaranteed González's election. The 202-strong PSOE absolute majority would come to be known as the "roller" (rodillo in Spanish), in reference to the party's overwhelming parliamentary power. Any bill submitted by González' government was assured to be approved by Congress, with the parliamentary process of law-making and approval turning into a mere formality.

== Legacy ==
The October 1982 general election led to a major reconfiguration of the Spanish political scene. While institutionally, the Spanish transition to democracy ended in December 1978 after the approval of the 1978 Constitution in referendum and its subsequent adoption, historically the transition is considered to have ended with the 1982 election. The threat of a military coup d'etat after the failed 23-F coup had effectively ended, after preparations for the 27-O coup attempt were foiled. The election's aftermath ensured a lasting political stability that would favour the implementation of reforms that would definitively settle democracy in Spain. Furthermore, the exceptionally high turnout (80%) was seen as a strong endorsement by the Spanish people on the democratic system, and the political earthquake resulting from the election was deemed as the Spaniards' desire to break up with the past and to look into the future, rallying behind the PSOE and the "for change" premises it had campaigned for.

The UCD, the political party which had led the country into the transition from Francisco Franco's dictatorship into a fledgling democracy, was not only ousted from power, but almost entirely decimated in the election. From the 35% of the share and 168 seats it had obtained in 1979 it was reduced to a mere 7% and 11 seats. It had lost 4.9 million votes in its last three years in power (roughly 80% of its 1979 voter base) and was left as a third party with no ability to influence the government. As a result, the UCD, which had been in office since its inception in 1977 until December 1982, effectively ceased to exist as in February 1983, when its leadership decided to dissolve the party as it was unable to cope with the mounting debts. Its collapse was seen with time as the result of the voters' perception of it not acting with consistency, clarity and effectiveness, and because of the internal party division and infighting that plagued the UCD's final time in power.

The PSOE won the election in a landslide with a large absolute majority of seats and roughly half (48.1%) of the vote share. With 202 out of the 350 seats at stake in the Congress and 134 out of the 208 electable seats in the Senate, it won roughly 60% of the seats in each chamber, a record result not surpassed ever since by any political party. Its 10,127,392-vote result, comprising 38% of the voting-able electorate at the time, was not reached by any party until the 2000 general election held 18 years later, when the PP obtained 10,321,178 (however, as the voting-able electorate was much larger in 2000, that result was not as lopsized in percentage terms as it was in 1982). For the next decade, the Socialists would dominate Spanish politics with no other party having a realistic chance of forming government, leading some commentators to suggest that Spain had moved to a dominant-party system. Eventually, the PSOE would not be seriously challenged until 1993, when they were reduced to a minority government, remaining in power for another 3 years until 1996. To date, Felipe González' 1982–1996 stay in power (four terms comprising 14 years) remains the longest period of continuous government by a democratically elected PM, with governments ever since usually having shorter durations of 8 years (two terms).

The People's Alliance became the major opposition party as a result of this election, having been a minor party in the 1977–1982 period. It replaced the UCD as the main non-socialist party in Spain, and has maintained this position for most of the last four decades. However, despite its position as the main alternative to the PSOE, its perceived right-wing stance, subsequent internal crises and leadership changes, as well as the PSOE's enduring popularity until the early 1990s, ensured the party would remain electorally stagnant throughout the decade. AP would also face the direct competition of Suárez's CDS in the 1986–1989 period, which for some time was even expected to surpass AP as the PSOE's main rival. The party's position would not improve until its relaunch as the People's Party in 1989 and the leadership of José María Aznar, which would eventually led to the establishment in 1993 of a two-party system in Spain, and in the PP's rise to power in 1996.

== Bibliography ==
Legislation

- Real Decreto-ley 20/1977, de 18 de marzo, sobre Normas Electorales (Royal Decree-Law 20/1977). Official State Gazette (in Spanish). 18 March 1977. BOE-A-1977-7445.
- Constitución Española (Constitution). Official State Gazette (in Spanish). 27 December 1978 [version as of 29 December 1978]. BOE-A-1978-31229.
- Ley 57/1980, de 15 de noviembre, sobre cambio de denominación de la actual provincia de «Logroño» por la de «Provincia de La Rioja» (Law 57/1980). Official State Gazette (in Spanish). 15 November 1980. BOE-A-1980-25519.
- Ley Orgánica 8/1981, de 30 de diciembre, de Estatuto de Autonomía para Cantabria (Organic Law 7/1981). Official State Gazette (in Spanish). 30 December 1981 [version as of 11 January 1982]. BOE-A-1982-635.
- Real Decreto 2057/1982, de 27 de agosto, de disolución de las Cortes Generales y fijación de la fecha de las elecciones (Royal Decree 2057/1982). Official State Gazette (in Spanish). 27 August 1982. BOE-A-1982-21846.
- Real Decreto 2076/1982, de 27 de agosto, por el que se dictan normas complementarias para las elecciones al Congreso de los Diputados y al Senado (Royal Decree 2076/1982). Official State Gazette (in Spanish). 27 August 1982. BOE-A-1982-21927.
- Real Decreto 2964/1982, de 12 de noviembre, por el que se convoca al Congreso de los Diputados para que se reúna en sesión constitutiva (Royal Decree 2964/1982). Official State Gazette (in Spanish). 12 November 1982. BOE-A-1982-29600.
- Real Decreto 2965/1982, de 12 de noviembre, por el que se convoca a los Senadores para celebrar Junta preparatoria (Royal Decree 2965/1982). Official State Gazette (in Spanish). 12 November 1982. BOE-A-1982-29601.

Other

- Carreras de Odriozola, Albert; Tafunell Sambola, Xavier (2005) [1989]. Estadísticas históricas de España, siglos XIX-XX (PDF) (in Spanish). Vol. 1 (II ed.). Bilbao: Fundación BBVA. pp. 1072–1097. ISBN 84-96515-00-1. Archived from the original (PDF) on 24 September 2015.
