= 1987 Spanish local elections in Asturias =

This article presents the results breakdown of the local elections held in Asturias on 10 June 1987. The following tables show detailed results in the autonomous community's most populous municipalities, sorted alphabetically.

== City control ==
The following table lists party control in the most populous municipalities, including provincial capitals (highlighted in bold). Gains for a party are highlighted in that party's colour.

Municipality	Population	Previous control	New control
Avilés	86,141	Spanish Socialist Workers' Party (PSOE)	Spanish Socialist Workers' Party (PSOE)
Gijón	258,291	Spanish Socialist Workers' Party (PSOE)	Spanish Socialist Workers' Party (PSOE)
Langreo	53,987	Spanish Socialist Workers' Party (PSOE)	Spanish Socialist Workers' Party (PSOE)
Mieres	57,025	Spanish Socialist Workers' Party (PSOE)	Spanish Socialist Workers' Party (PSOE)
**Oviedo**	185,864	Spanish Socialist Workers' Party (PSOE)	Spanish Socialist Workers' Party (PSOE)
San Martín del Rey Aurelio	25,186	Spanish Socialist Workers' Party (PSOE)	Spanish Socialist Workers' Party (PSOE)
Siero	42,108	Spanish Socialist Workers' Party (PSOE)	Spanish Socialist Workers' Party (PSOE)

== Municipalities ==
=== Avilés ===
Population: 86,141

← Summary of the 10 June 1987 City Council of Avilés election results →
Parties and alliances	Popular vote			Seats	
Parties and alliances	Votes	%	±pp	Total	+/−
Spanish Socialist Workers' Party (PSOE)	18,110	39.78	−23.62	10	−7
Democratic and Social Centre (CDS)	10,754	23.62	+19.77	6	+6
People's Alliance (AP)^{1}	8,457	18.58	−4.00	5	−1
United Left (IU)^{2}	6,595	14.49	+5.54	4	+2
Workers' Party of Spain–Communist Unity (PTE–UC)	448	0.98	New	0	±0
People's Democratic Party (PDP)	316	0.69	New	0	±0
Workers' Socialist Party (PST)	237	0.52	New	0	±0
Humanist Platform (PH)	142	0.31	New	0	±0
Blank ballots	468	1.03	+1.03		
Total	45,527			25	±0
Valid votes	45,527	98.45	+0.38		
Invalid votes	718	1.55	−0.38		
Votes cast / turnout	46,245	70.25	−0.34		
Abstentions	19,584	29.75	+0.34		
Registered voters	65,829				
Sources
Footnotes: ^{1} People's Alliance results are compared to People's Coalition totals in the 1983 election.; ^{2} United Left results are compared to Communist Party of Spain totals in the 1983 election.

=== Gijón ===
Population: 258,291

← Summary of the 10 June 1987 City Council of Gijón election results →
Parties and alliances	Popular vote			Seats	
Parties and alliances	Votes	%	±pp	Total	+/−
Spanish Socialist Workers' Party (PSOE)	46,537	37.68	−19.77	11	−6
People's Alliance (AP)^{1}	28,767	23.29	−3.69	7	±0
Democratic and Social Centre (CDS)	25,380	20.55	+17.33	6	+6
United Left (IU)^{2}	14,484	11.73	+1.21	3	±0
Asturianist Party (PAS)	3,077	2.49	New	0	±0
Workers' Party of Spain–Communist Unity (PTE–UC)	1,358	1.10	New	0	±0
People's Democratic Party (PDP)	1,067	0.86	New	0	±0
Workers' Socialist Party (PST)	783	0.63	New	0	±0
Humanist Platform (PH)	429	0.35	New	0	±0
Blank ballots	1,630	1.32	+1.32		
Total	123,512			27	±0
Valid votes	123,512	98.15	+1.01		
Invalid votes	2,327	1.85	−1.01		
Votes cast / turnout	125,839	63.25	−1.47		
Abstentions	73,127	36.75	+1.47		
Registered voters	198,966				
Sources
Footnotes: ^{1} People's Alliance results are compared to People's Coalition totals in the 1983 election.; ^{2} United Left results are compared to Communist Party of Spain totals in the 1983 election.

=== Langreo ===
Population: 53,987

← Summary of the 10 June 1987 City Council of Langreo election results →
Parties and alliances	Popular vote			Seats	
Parties and alliances	Votes	%	±pp	Total	+/−
Spanish Socialist Workers' Party (PSOE)	10,849	36.95	−18.08	10	−4
United Left (IU)^{1}	8,172	27.83	+5.79	7	+1
Democratic and Social Centre (CDS)	5,147	17.53	New	4	+4
People's Alliance (AP)^{2}	4,508	15.35	−4.33	4	−1
Revolutionary Communist League (LCR)	366	1.25	+0.58	0	±0
Blank ballots	322	1.10	+1.10		
Total	29,364			25	±0
Valid votes	29,364	98.52	−0.50		
Invalid votes	441	1.48	+0.50		
Votes cast / turnout	29,805	68.65	+3.36		
Abstentions	13,612	31.35	−3.36		
Registered voters	43,417				
Sources
Footnotes: ^{1} United Left results are compared to Communist Party of Spain totals in the 1983 election.; ^{2} People's Alliance results are compared to People's Coalition totals in the 1983 election.

=== Mieres ===
Population: 57,025

← Summary of the 10 June 1987 City Council of Mieres election results →
Parties and alliances	Popular vote			Seats	
Parties and alliances	Votes	%	±pp	Total	+/−
Spanish Socialist Workers' Party (PSOE)	10,922	34.93	−19.68	10	−5
United Left (IU)^{1}	8,517	27.24	+4.39	7	+1
Democratic and Social Centre (CDS)	5,119	16.37	+14.39	4	+4
People's Alliance (AP)^{2}	4,730	15.13	−2.08	4	±0
Communist Movement of Asturias (MCA)	1,543	4.93	+1.59	0	±0
Humanist Platform (PH)	105	0.34	New	0	±0
Blank ballots	331	1.06	+1.06		
Total	31,267			25	±0
Valid votes	31,267	98.62	−0.20		
Invalid votes	437	1.38	+0.20		
Votes cast / turnout	31,704	71.08	+4.80		
Abstentions	12,901	28.92	−4.80		
Registered voters	44,605				
Sources
Footnotes: ^{1} United Left results are compared to Communist Party of Spain totals in the 1983 election.; ^{2} People's Alliance results are compared to People's Coalition totals in the 1983 election.

=== Oviedo ===
Population: 185,864

← Summary of the 10 June 1987 City Council of Oviedo election results →
Parties and alliances	Popular vote			Seats	
Parties and alliances	Votes	%	±pp	Total	+/−
Spanish Socialist Workers' Party (PSOE)	40,809	42.02	−2.68	12	−1
People's Alliance (AP)^{1}	31,022	31.94	−11.66	10	−3
Democratic and Social Centre (CDS)	14,780	15.22	+11.41	4	+4
United Left (IU)^{2}	6,198	6.38	+0.15	1	±0
People's Democratic Party (PDP)	999	1.03	New	0	±0
Independent Solution (SI)	933	0.96	New	0	±0
Workers' Party of Spain–Communist Unity (PTE–UC)	665	0.68	New	0	±0
Humanist Platform (PH)	362	0.37	New	0	±0
Blank ballots	1,356	1.40	+1.40		
Total	97,124			27	±0
Valid votes	97,124	98.49	+0.46		
Invalid votes	1,490	1.51	−0.46		
Votes cast / turnout	98,614	67.54	+1.94		
Abstentions	47,403	32.46	−1.94		
Registered voters	146,017				
Sources
Footnotes: ^{1} People's Alliance results are compared to People's Coalition totals in the 1983 election.; ^{2} United Left results are compared to Communist Party of Spain totals in the 1983 election.

=== San Martín del Rey Aurelio ===
Population: 25,186

← Summary of the 10 June 1987 City Council of San Martín del Rey Aurelio election results →
Parties and alliances	Popular vote			Seats	
Parties and alliances	Votes	%	±pp	Total	+/−
Spanish Socialist Workers' Party (PSOE)	6,226	41.79	−18.51	9	−4
United Left (IU)^{1}	4,258	28.58	+4.70	6	+1
Democratic and Social Centre (CDS)	2,724	18.28	New	4	+4
People's Alliance (AP)^{2}	1,506	10.11	−5.70	2	−1
Blank ballots	186	1.25	+1.25		
Total	14,900			21	±0
Valid votes	14,900	98.69	+0.14		
Invalid votes	198	1.31	−0.14		
Votes cast / turnout	15,098	76.24	+7.09		
Abstentions	4,704	23.76	−7.09		
Registered voters	19,802				
Sources
Footnotes: ^{1} United Left results are compared to Communist Party of Spain totals in the 1983 election.; ^{2} People's Alliance results are compared to People's Coalition totals in the 1983 election.

=== Siero ===
Population: 42,108

← Summary of the 10 June 1987 City Council of Siero election results →
Parties and alliances	Popular vote			Seats	
Parties and alliances	Votes	%	±pp	Total	+/−
Spanish Socialist Workers' Party (PSOE)	9,108	44.75	−18.32	10	−4
Democratic and Social Centre (CDS)	4,132	20.30	New	4	+4
People's Alliance (AP)^{1}	4,069	19.99	−1.30	4	±0
United Left (IU)^{2}	2,787	13.69	+3.91	3	+1
Independents (INDEP)	n/a	n/a	−5.85	0	−1
Blank ballots	256	1.26	+1.26		
Total	20,352			21	±0
Valid votes	20,352	98.71	−0.14		
Invalid votes	265	1.29	+0.14		
Votes cast / turnout	20,617	63.73	+2.37		
Abstentions	11,736	36.27	−2.37		
Registered voters	32,353				
Sources
Footnotes: ^{1} People's Alliance results are compared to People's Coalition totals in the 1983 election.; ^{2} United Left results are compared to Communist Party of Spain totals in the 1983 election.

== See also ==
- 1987 Asturian regional election
