= 1979 Spanish local elections in Asturias =

This article presents the results breakdown of the local elections held in Asturias on 3 April 1979. The following tables show detailed results in the autonomous community's most populous municipalities, sorted alphabetically.

== City control ==
The following table lists party control in the most populous municipalities, including provincial capitals (highlighted in bold).

Municipality	Population	New control
Avilés	89,285	Spanish Socialist Workers' Party (PSOE)
Gijón	253,294	Spanish Socialist Workers' Party (PSOE)
Langreo	62,973	Spanish Socialist Workers' Party (PSOE)
Mieres	62,513	Spanish Socialist Workers' Party (PSOE)
**Oviedo**	179,866	Union of the Democratic Centre (UCD)
San Martín del Rey Aurelio	29,073	Spanish Socialist Workers' Party (PSOE)
Siero	39,179	Spanish Socialist Workers' Party (PSOE)

== Municipalities ==
=== Avilés ===
Population: 89,285

Summary of the 3 April 1979 City Council of Avilés election results →
Parties and alliances	Popular vote			Seats	
Parties and alliances	Votes	%	±pp	Total	+/−
Union of the Democratic Centre (UCD)	15,091	40.71	n/a	**11**	n/a
Spanish Socialist Workers' Party (PSOE)	13,462	36.32	n/a	**10**	n/a
Communist Party of Spain (PCE)	6,155	16.61	n/a	**4**	n/a
Communist Movement–Organization of Communist Left (MCA–OIC)	1,424	3.84	n/a	0	n/a
Workers' Revolutionary Organization (ORT)	399	1.08	n/a	0	n/a
Democratic Coalition (CD)	355	0.96	n/a	0	n/a
Republican Left (IR)	181	0.49	n/a	0	n/a
Party of Labour of Spain (PTE)	0	0.00	n/a	0	n/a
Blank ballots	0	0.00	n/a		
**Total**	**37,067**			**25**	**n/a**
Valid votes	37,067	99.35	n/a		
Invalid votes	244	0.65	n/a		
**Votes cast / turnout**	**37,311**	**59.72**	**n/a**		
Abstentions	25,162	40.28	n/a		
**Registered voters**	**62,473**				

=== Gijón ===
Population: 253,294

Summary of the 3 April 1979 City Council of Gijón election results →
Parties and alliances	Popular vote			Seats	
Parties and alliances	Votes	%	±pp	Total	+/−
Spanish Socialist Workers' Party (PSOE)	41,686	41.35	n/a	**13**	n/a
Union of the Democratic Centre (UCD)	28,978	28.74	n/a	**9**	n/a
Communist Party of Spain (PCE)	15,270	15.15	n/a	**4**	n/a
Democratic Coalition (CD)	5,459	5.41	n/a	**1**	n/a
Gijonese Candidacy for Popular City Council (CGAyPop)	4,717	4.68	n/a	0	n/a
Independent Movement of Gijón Neighbourhoods (MIBG)	2,252	2.23	n/a	0	n/a
Communist Movement–Organization of Communist Left (MCA–OIC)	1,227	1.22	n/a	0	n/a
Communist Organization of Spain (Red Flag) (OCE–BR)	755	0.75	n/a	0	n/a
Workers' Revolutionary Organization (ORT)	475	0.47	n/a	0	n/a
Party of Labour of Spain (PTE)	0	0.00	n/a	0	n/a
Blank ballots	0	0.00	n/a		
**Total**	**100,819**			**27**	**n/a**
Valid votes	100,819	99.36	n/a		
Invalid votes	645	0.64	n/a		
**Votes cast / turnout**	**101,464**	**55.42**	**n/a**		
Abstentions	81,632	44.58	n/a		
**Registered voters**	**183,096**				

=== Langreo ===
Population: 62,973

Summary of the 3 April 1979 City Council of Langreo election results →
Parties and alliances	Popular vote			Seats	
Parties and alliances	Votes	%	±pp	Total	+/−
Spanish Socialist Workers' Party (PSOE)	10,633	37.56	n/a	**10**	n/a
Communist Party of Spain (PCE)	7,272	25.69	n/a	**7**	n/a
Union of the Democratic Centre (UCD)	6,101	21.55	n/a	**6**	n/a
Democratic Coalition (CD)	1,973	6.97	n/a	**2**	n/a
Popular Workers' Candidacy (COP)	1,333	4.71	n/a	0	n/a
Workers' Revolutionary Organization (ORT)	543	1.92	n/a	0	n/a
Revolutionary Communist League (LCR)	260	0.92	n/a	0	n/a
Communist Movement–Organization of Communist Left (MCA–OIC)	196	0.69	n/a	0	n/a
Blank ballots	0	0.00	n/a		
**Total**	**28,311**			**25**	**n/a**
Valid votes	28,311	99.07	n/a		
Invalid votes	266	0.93	n/a		
**Votes cast / turnout**	**28,577**	**59.93**	**n/a**		
Abstentions	19,104	40.07	n/a		
**Registered voters**	**47,681**				

=== Mieres ===
Population: 62,513

Summary of the 3 April 1979 City Council of Mieres election results →
Parties and alliances	Popular vote			Seats	
Parties and alliances	Votes	%	±pp	Total	+/−
Spanish Socialist Workers' Party (PSOE)	12,133	39.48	n/a	10	n/a
Communist Party of Spain (PCE)	10,132	32.97	n/a	9	n/a
Union of the Democratic Centre (UCD)	4,559	14.84	n/a	4	n/a
Democratic Coalition (CD)	2,100	6.83	n/a	1	n/a
Communist Movement–Organization of Communist Left (MCA–OIC)	1,805	5.87	n/a	1	n/a
Blank ballots	0	0.00	n/a		
**Total**	**30,729**			25	**n/a**
Valid votes	30,729	98.92	n/a		
Invalid votes	337	1.08	n/a		
**Votes cast / turnout**	**31,066**	**64.33**	**n/a**		
Abstentions	17,222	35.67	n/a		
**Registered voters**	**48,288**				

=== Oviedo ===
Population: 179,866

Summary of the 3 April 1979 City Council of Oviedo election results →
Parties and alliances	Popular vote			Seats	
Parties and alliances	Votes	%	±pp	Total	+/−
Union of the Democratic Centre (UCD)	31,030	40.96	n/a	**12**	n/a
Spanish Socialist Workers' Party (PSOE)	29,324	38.70	n/a	**11**	n/a
Communist Party of Spain (PCE)	7,678	10.13	n/a	**2**	n/a
Democratic Coalition (CD)	5,542	7.31	n/a	**2**	n/a
Communist Movement–Organization of Communist Left (MCA–OIC)	1,329	1.75	n/a	0	n/a
Workers' Communist Party (PCT)	474	0.63	n/a	0	n/a
Party of Labour of Spain (PTE)	387	0.51	n/a	0	n/a
Workers' Revolutionary Organization (ORT)	0	0.00	n/a	0	n/a
Blank ballots	0	0.00	n/a		
**Total**	**75,764**			**27**	**n/a**
Valid votes	75,764	99.22	n/a		
Invalid votes	598	0.78	n/a		
**Votes cast / turnout**	**76,362**	**56.71**	**n/a**		
Abstentions	58,282	43.29	n/a		
**Registered voters**	**134,644**				

=== San Martín del Rey Aurelio ===
Population: 29,073

Summary of the 3 April 1979 City Council of San Martín del Rey Aurelio election results →
Parties and alliances	Popular vote			Seats	
Parties and alliances	Votes	%	±pp	Total	+/−
Spanish Socialist Workers' Party (PSOE)	6,863	50.22	n/a	**11**	n/a
Communist Party of Spain (PCE)	4,145	30.33	n/a	**7**	n/a
Union of the Democratic Centre (UCD)	2,177	15.93	n/a	**3**	n/a
Democratic Coalition (CD)	425	3.11	n/a	0	n/a
Workers' Revolutionary Organization (ORT)	57	0.42	n/a	0	n/a
Blank ballots	0	0.00	n/a		
**Total**	**13,667**			**21**	**n/a**
Valid votes	13,667	99.06	n/a		
Invalid votes	129	0.94	n/a		
**Votes cast / turnout**	**13,796**	**61.62**	**n/a**		
Abstentions	8,592	38.38	n/a		
**Registered voters**	**22,388**				

=== Siero ===
Population: 39,179

Summary of the 3 April 1979 City Council of Siero election results →
Parties and alliances	Popular vote			Seats	
Parties and alliances	Votes	%	±pp	Total	+/−
Spanish Socialist Workers' Party (PSOE)	7,131	42.18	n/a	**9**	n/a
Union of the Democratic Centre (UCD)	6,457	38.19	n/a	**8**	n/a
Communist Party of Spain (PCE)	3,013	17.82	n/a	**4**	n/a
Workers' Revolutionary Organization (ORT)	168	0.99	n/a	0	n/a
Communist Movement–Organization of Communist Left (MCA–OIC)	137	0.81	n/a	0	n/a
Blank ballots	0	0.00	n/a		
**Total**	**16,906**			**21**	**n/a**
Valid votes	16,906	98.83	n/a		
Invalid votes	201	1.17	n/a		
**Votes cast / turnout**	**17,107**	**57.01**	**n/a**		
Abstentions	12,902	42.99	n/a		
**Registered voters**	**30,009**				
