= Democratic Action Party (disambiguation) =

The Democratic Action Party or Parti Tindakan Demokratik is a centre-left political party in Malaysia.

Democratic Action Party or Democratic Action may also refer to:

== Current parties ==
- Democratic Action Party (Malaysia)
- Democratic Action Party (Kenya) or DAP–K
- Democratic Action Party (Moldova) or Partidul «Acţiunea Democratică» (PAD)
- Democratic Action (Philippines) or Aksyon Demokratiko
- Democratic Action (Venezuela) or Acción Democrática (AD)

== Former parties ==
- Action démocratique du Québec, Canada, 1994–2012
- Democratic Action Party (Malta), 1947–c.1950
- Democratic Action Party (Panama) or Partido Acción Democrático (PAD)
- Democratic Action Party (Spain), 1981–1983

== See also ==
- Party of Democratic Action (disambiguation)
- Democratic Party (disambiguation)
- Action Party (disambiguation)
