= Party of Democratic Action (disambiguation) =

Party of Democratic Action is a political party in Bosnia and Herzegovina.

It also has the following eponymous offshoots in other countries:

- Party of Democratic Action of Croatia
- Party of Democratic Action (Kosovo)
- Party of Democratic Action of Sandžak, a Bosniak minority party in Serbia
- Party for Democratic Action - a similarly named Albanian minority party in Serbia
- Party of Democratic Action of Montenegro, a former party in Montenegro (1990-2002)
- Party of Democratic Action of Macedonia

== See also ==
- Democratic Action Party (disambiguation)
