= Óscar Alzaga =

Spanish jurist, academic and politician (born 1942)

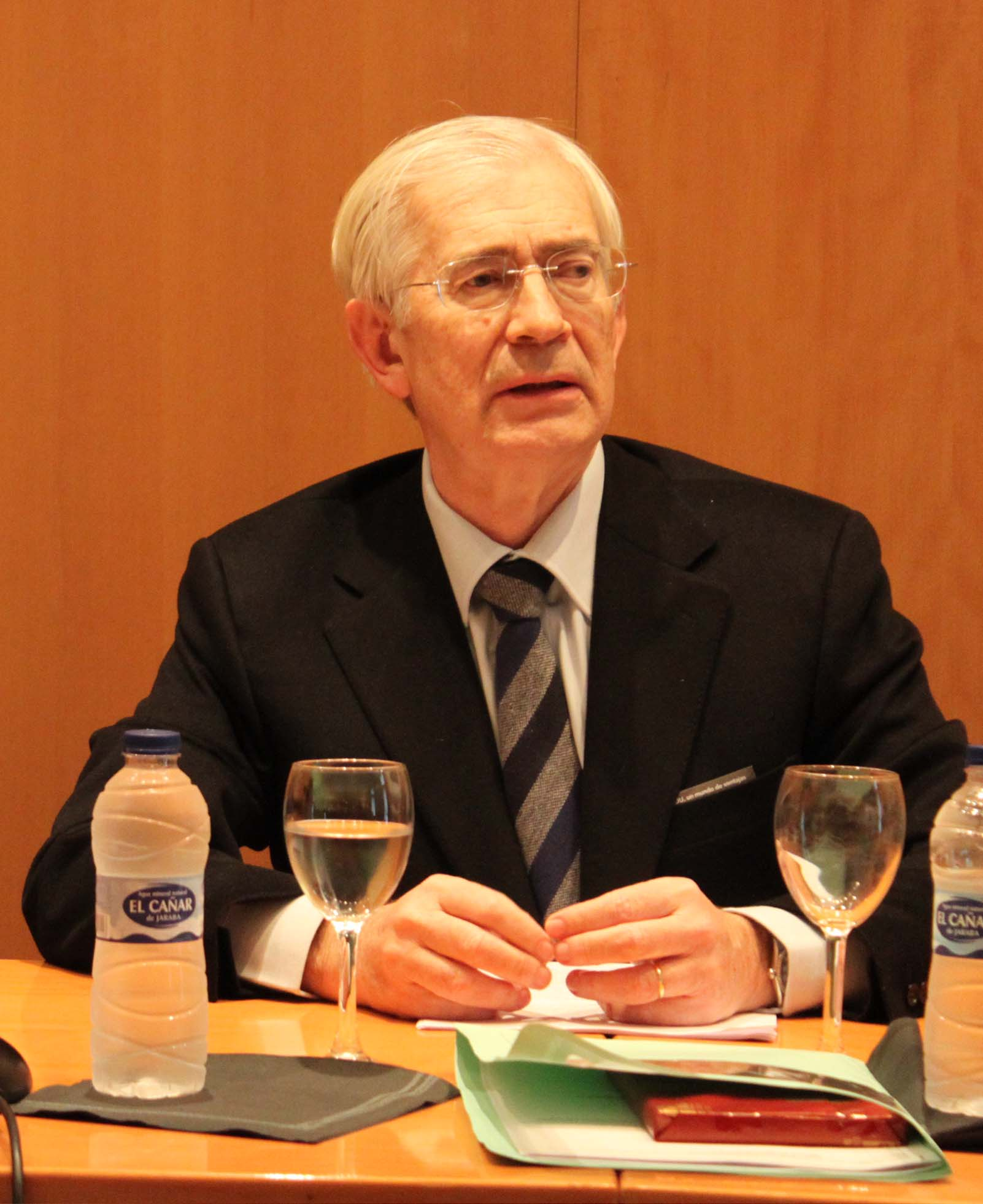

Chairman of People's Democratic Party
- In office July 1982 – May 1987
- Preceded by: Office established
- Succeeded by: Javier Rupérez

Personal details
- Born: Óscar Alzaga Villaamil; 29 May 1942 (age 84) Madrid, Kingdom of Spain
- Education: University of Madrid; Autonomous University of Madrid

Óscar Alzaga (born 29 May 1942) is a Spanish jurist, academic and politician. He is the founder of People's Democratic Party. Until 1987 he was an active politician in Spain.

== Biography ==
Alzaga was born in Madrid on 29 May 1942. He received a degree in law from the University of Madrid in 1964 and a PhD degree from Autonomous University of Madrid in 1972.

From 1969 Alzaga started his academic career at Autonomous University of Madrid. In the Francoist Spain he was part of the Tácito group which was a tolerated opposition movement. Alzaga joined the Union of the Democratic Centre, an election alliance, in 1977 general elections being part of the Christian Democratic Party. He was among those who criticised the Union of the Democratic Centre in terms of its approach towards the center-right politics. In July 1982 he left the Christian Democratic Party to establish the People's Democratic Party. He headed the party until May 1987 when he resigned from the post. Javier Rupérez replaced him as the chairman of the People's Democratic Party.

== Works ==
Alzaga has written extensively in Spanish about the transition from Francoism to Democracy:

- (2021). La conquista de la transición (1960-1978)
- (2020). Derecho político español según la Constitución de 1978
- (2019). 40 años de constitución: una mirada al futuro
- (2018). Sociedad democrática y Constitución
- (1973). La primera democracia cristiana en España
