= Francisco Fernández Ordóñez =

Spanish politician

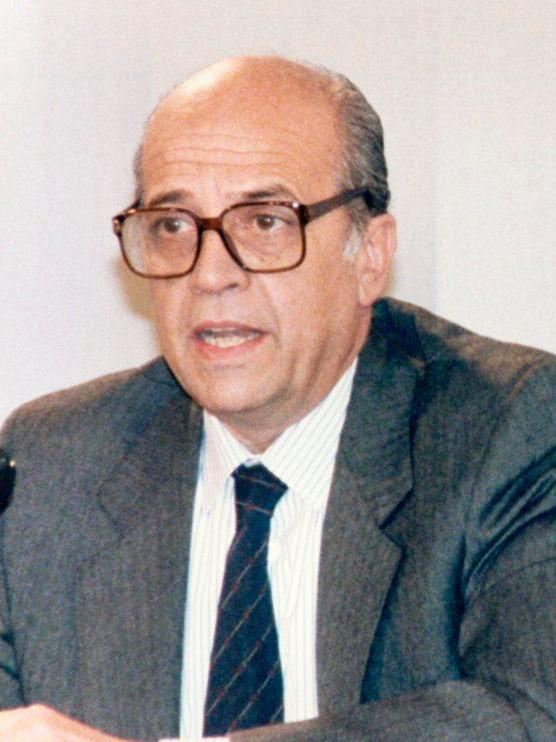
- Fernández Ordóñez in 1988

Minister of Foreign Affairs
- In office 5 July 1985 – 16 June 1992
- Prime Minister: Felipe González
- Preceded by: Fernando Morán
- Succeeded by: Javier Solana

Minister of Justice
- In office 9 September 1980 – 1 September 1981
- Prime Minister: Adolfo Suárez; Leopoldo Calvo Sotelo
- Preceded by: Íñigo Cavero
- Succeeded by: Pío Cabanillas Gallas

Minister of Finance
- In office 4 July 1977 – 6 April 1979
- Prime Minister: Adolfo Suárez
- Preceded by: Eduardo Carriles Galarraga
- Succeeded by: Jaime García Añoveros

Personal details
- Born: Francisco Fernández Ordóñez; 22 June 1930 Madrid, Spain
- Died: 7 August 1992 (aged 62) Madrid, Spain
- Resting place: Mingorrubio Cemetery
- Party: Union of the Democratic Centre (UCD), Democratic Action Party (PAD), Spanish Socialist Workers' Party (PSOE)
- Relations: Miguel Ángel Fernández Ordóñez (brother)
- Profession: Lawyer, Civil Servant

Francisco Fernández Ordóñez (22 June 1930 – 7 August 1992) was a Spanish politician who served as Spain's Minister of Foreign Affairs, under former Spanish Prime Minister Felipe González, from 1985 until shortly before his death from a terminal illness in 1992.

== Early life and education ==
Fernández Ordóñez was born on 22 June 1930. He studied law while living in Madrid, Spain, as well as at Harvard University in Boston, Massachusetts.

== Career ==
=== Minister of Finance and Justice ===
After graduation, Fernández Ordóñez joined the ministry of economy in 1959, becoming the assistant secretary in 1973 and president of the National Institute of Industry in 1974, but resigned the same year for political reasons. He then founded the tiny Social Democratic Party. In 1977, his party joined the larger Union of the Democratic Centre (UCD), led by Adolfo Suárez, serving under him as finance minister from 1977 until 1980, and then as the minister of justice, in which position he legalized divorce.

=== Foreign Affairs ===
In 1982 he resigned from office and from the UCD in protest over a case of police torture, creating the small, new Democratic Action Party (Spain) (PAD). He then joined the Spanish Socialist Workers' Party (PSOE), becoming one of its deputies in the Cortes Generales when it won the general election of 28 October 1982. He was president of the Foreign Bank of Spain until 1986 and was appointed later as minister of foreign affairs. He also served as Member of the Congress of Deputies for Madrid from 1977 to 1979 and from 1982 onwards and represented Zaragoza between 1979 and 1982.

== Later life ==
Fernández Ordóñez died on 7 August 1992 of cancer at the age of 62.
