= Opinion polling for the 1982 Spanish general election =

In the run up to the 1982 Spanish general election, various organisations carried out opinion polling to gauge voting intention in Spain during the term of the 1st Cortes Generales. Results of such polls are displayed in this article. The date range for these opinion polls is from the previous general election, held on 1 March 1979, to the day the next election was held, on 28 October 1982.

Voting intention estimates refer mainly to a hypothetical Congress of Deputies election. Polls are listed in reverse chronological order, showing the most recent first and using the dates when the survey fieldwork was done, as opposed to the date of publication. Where the fieldwork dates are unknown, the date of publication is given instead. The highest percentage figure in each polling survey is displayed with its background shaded in the leading party's colour. If a tie ensues, this is applied to the figures with the highest percentages. The "Lead" columns on the right shows the percentage-point difference between the parties with the highest percentages in a poll.

== Electoral polling ==
=== Nationwide polling ===
==== Voting intention estimates ====
The table below lists nationwide voting intention estimates. Refusals are generally excluded from the party vote percentages, while question wording and the treatment of "don't know" responses and those not intending to vote may vary between polling organisations. When available, seat projections determined by the polling organisations are displayed below (or in place of) the percentages in a smaller font; 176 seats were required for an absolute majority in the Congress of Deputies.

Color key:

Exit poll

Polling firm/Commissioner	Fieldwork date	Sample size	Turnout	UCD	PSOE	PCE	AP	CiU	FN	PSA–PA	PNV	HB	ERC	EE	PAD	CDS	Lead
1982 general election	28 Oct 1982	—N/a	80.0	6.8; 11	48.1; 202	4.1; 4	26.4; 107	3.7; 12	0.5; 0	0.4; 0	1.9; 8	1.0; 2	0.7; 1	0.5; 1	(Note: Within PSOE.)	2.9; 2	21.7
PSOE	28 Oct 1982	85,300	?	6.6; 13	48.0; 202	4.3; 4	26.0; 103	4.0; 13	–	0.4; 0	2.0; 9	0.9; 3	0.6; 1	0.4; 0		3.1; 2	22.0
Ideal	28 Oct 1982	?	75.7	7.2; 13	45.7; 198	3.8; 5	25.5; 104	4.5; 12	0.4; 0	–	2.1; 8	1.0; 2	0.7; 1	0.5; 0		2.6; 2	20.2
Sofemasa/El País (Note: Undecided and/or abstentionists excluded.)	16–19 Oct 1982	18,255	78.5	6.5; 7/12	48.6; 193/217	5.9; 8/11	24.0; 87/107	2.5; 8/9	1.0; 0	–	1.7; 8/10	1.1; 4/5	0.8; 1	0.7; 3		4.0; 4/5	24.6
Alef/Grupo 16	9–14 Oct 1982	7,000	?	9.5; 18	49.2; 217	7.8; 14	18.2; 69	0.7; 5	1.0; 0	0.2; 0	2.2; 11	0.9; 3	0.2; 1	0.7; 2		5.9; 8	31.0
Sofemasa/El País	1–7 Oct 1982	1,163	?	5.0	51.0	4.3	19.3	–	0.9	–	–	–	–	–		4.6	31.7
CDS	4 Oct 1982	?	?	? 14/16	? 166/170	? 15/16	? 87/93	–	–	–	–	–	–	–		? 20/34	?
SEE	4 Oct 1982	?	?	? 21	? 158	? 15	? 121	? 14	–	? 1	? 10	? 2	? 1	? 2		? 5	?
Alef/Grupo 16	25–30 Sep 1982	3,008	78.8	10.6	45.9	5.8	16.3	–	0.7	–	–	–	–	–		8.4	29.6
Sofemasa/El País	24–30 Sep 1982	2,460	?	4.8	51.5	5.2	14.8	–	0.5	–	–	–	–	–		2.3	36.7
AP	27 Sep 1982	6,000	?	? 15	? 141	? 11	27.4; 125	? 14	–	? 1	? 7	? 2	? 1	? 2		? 5	?
ICSA–Gallup	6–26 Sep 1982	?	?	10.0	44.0	7.0	20.0	–	–	–	–	–	–	–	–	–	24.0
UCD	22 Sep 1982	25,000	64	? 40	? 200	? 9	? 60	–	–	–	–	–	–	–		? 2	?
Alef/Grupo 16	5–19 Sep 1982	3,000	?	10.7	51.3	6.0	13.0	–	0.5	–	–	–	–	–	–	5.2	38.3
El País	9 Sep 1982	?	?	13.6	48.3	6.4	18.5	–	–	–	–	–	–	–	–	–	29.8
Birds	7 Sep 1982	?	?	? 53	? 156	? 16	? 85	? 14	? 1	–	? 9	? 4	? 1	(Note: Within HB.)	–	? 11	?
ABC	5 Sep 1982	?	?	? 26	? 190	? 17	? 75	–	–	–	–	–	–	–	–	? 20	?
UCD	4 Sep 1982	?	?	? 35	? 180	? 12	? 80	–	–	–	–	–	–	–	–	? 15	?
Sofemasa/El País	24–30 Aug 1982	2,460	?	8.5	50.7	5.6	11.8	–	1.4	–	–	–	–	–	–	2.4	38.9
Metra Seis/Diario 16	6 Aug 1982	1,857	84.8	8.0	42.1	1.9	12.2	1.9	1.6	0.6	0.5	0.5	1.8	0.5	2.2	–	29.9
ICSA–Gallup	5–18 Jul 1982	?	?	14.0	45.0	7.0	19.0	–	–	–	–	–	–	–	–	–	26.0
AP	31 May–30 Jun 1982	6,000	?	? 28	? 144	? 9	? 103	? 9	–	–	? 7	? 2	–	? 1	–	–	?
ICSA–Gallup	5–25 Apr 1982	?	?	17.0	40.0	7.0	20.0	–	–	–	–	–	–	–	–	–	20.0
Tiempo	12 Dec 1981	?	?	21.0; 105	33.1; 144	9.1; 25	11.4; 38	–	–	–	–	–	–	–	–	–	12.1
ICSA–Gallup	2–22 Nov 1981	?	?	20.0	40.0	7.0	16.0	–	–	–	–	–	–	–	–	–	20.0
CEF/PSOE	28 Oct 1981	?	?	20.0	40.0	7.0	14.0	–	–	–	–	–	–	–	–	–	20.0
AP	6 Oct 1981	?	?	17.0– 21.0	29.0– 32.0	7.0– 10.0	9.0– 13.0	–	–	–	–	–	–	–	–	–	11.0– 12.0
ICSA–Gallup	8 Jul–17 Sep 1981	?	?	17.0	44.0	9.0	10.0	–	–	–	–	–	–	–	–	–	27.0
ICSA–Gallup	3 Jun–16 Jul 1981	?	?	21.0	45.0	8.0	9.0	–	–	–	–	–	–	–	–	–	24.0
ICSA–Gallup	6 May–18 Jun 1981	?	?	23.0	43.0	7.0	8.0	–	–	–	–	–	–	–	–	–	20.0
ICSA–Gallup	11 Apr–21 May 1981	?	?	25.0	40.0	8.0	8.0	–	–	–	–	–	–	–	–	–	15.0
ICSA–Gallup	4 Mar–23 Apr 1981	1,879	?	23.6	42.0	7.9	8.9	–	–	–	–	–	–	–	–	–	18.4
ICSA–Gallup	16 Jan–23 Feb 1981	1,892	?	25.9	36.3	9.1	9.1	2.7	2.1	1.8	2.2	1.2	1.0		–	–	10.4
ICSA–Gallup	16–30 Jan 1981	?	?	26.2	35.5	9.0	8.5	–	–	–	–	–	–	–	–	–	9.3
ICSA–Gallup	3 Nov–14 Dec 1980	?	?	27.4	34.4	8.6	8.7	–	–	–	–	–	–	–	–	–	7.0
ICSA–Gallup	6 Oct–16 Nov 1980	1,892	?	28.3	33.9	8.7	8.0	2.7	1.4	2.4	2.4	1.5	1.3		–	–	5.6
ICSA–Gallup	6–19 Oct 1980	?	?	28.7	34.7	8.6	6.9	–	–	–	–	–	–	–	–	–	6.0
ICSA–Gallup	4 Aug–14 Sep 1980	?	?	27.7	33.5	9.4	6.8	–	–	–	–	–	–	–	–	–	5.8
ICSA–Gallup	9 Jun–6 Jul 1980	1,888	?	25.8	33.8	10.4	8.5	–	–	–	–	–	–	–	–	–	8.0
ICSA–Gallup	9–16 Jun 1980	1,002	?	26.3	32.7	10.0	8.4	–	–	–	–	–	–	–	–	–	6.4
ICSA–Gallup	11 Mar–21 Apr 1980	?	?	29.6	29.3	9.5	6.6	–	–	–	–	–	–	–	–	–	0.3
ICSA–Gallup	11–21 Mar 1980	3,047	?	30.2	29.8	9.8	5.9	–	–	–	–	–	–	–	–	–	0.4
ICSA–Gallup	7 Jan–11 Feb 1980	?	?	30.8	31.9	10.4	6.3	–	–	–	–	–	–	–	–	–	1.1
ICSA–Gallup	5 Nov–16 Dec 1979	?	?	32.0	31.2	11.1	6.0	–	–	–	–	–	–	–	–	–	0.8
ICSA–Gallup	3 Sep–14 Oct 1979	?	?	31.7	34.3	9.7	5.6	–	–	–	–	–	–	–	–	–	2.6
ICSA–Gallup	11–18 Jun 1979	?	?	34.0	30.8	10.5	5.3	–	–	–	–	–	–	–	–	–	3.2
1979 general election	1 Mar 1979	—N/a	68.0	34.8; 168	30.4; 121	10.8; 23	6.1; 9	2.7; 8	2.1; 1	1.8; 5	1.6; 7	1.0; 3	0.7; 1	0.5; 1	–	–	4.4

==== Voting preferences ====
The table below lists raw, unweighted voting preferences.

Polling firm/Commissioner	Fieldwork date	Sample size	UCD	PSOE	PCE	AP	CiU	FN	PSA–PA	PNV	HB	ERC	EE	PAD	CDS	Question	☒	Lead
1982 general election	28 Oct 1982	—N/a	5.3	37.7	3.2	20.7	2.9	0.4	0.3	1.5	0.8	0.5	0.4		2.3	—N/a	20.0	17.0
Sofemasa/El País	16–19 Oct 1982	18,255	4.9	38.8	4.7	18.8	2.1	0.9	–	1.5	1.0	0.7	0.6		3.0	14.0	5.8	20.0
PSOE	9–14 Oct 1982	1,800	5.5	34.6	2.5	12.4	–	–	–	–	–	–	–		2.3	30.1	6.3	22.2
Alef/Grupo 16	9–14 Oct 1982	7,000	3.9	29.1	5.5	9.5	0.5	0.7	0.1	1.3	0.7	0.2	0.4		2.4	44.8		19.6
Sofemasa/El País	1–7 Oct 1982	1,163	3.5	35.4	3.0	13.4	–	0.6	–	–	–	–	–		3.2	24.6	6.0	22.0
PSOE	6 Oct 1982	?	5.0	33.0	2.0	11.0	2.0	–	–	1.0	–	1.0	–		2.0	22.0	–	22.0
CIS	1 Oct 1982	1,200	4.6	30.7	2.8	11.7	0.8	–	–	1.3	–	–	–		2.5	34.2	9.6	19.0
CIS	29 Sep–1 Oct 1982	24,793	4.7	23.8	2.7	9.0	1.2	0.4	0.1	0.8	0.5	0.4	0.3		1.3	44.8	8.7	14.8
Alef/Grupo 16	25–30 Sep 1982	3,008	4.2	27.4	4.1	9.5	–	0.4	–	–	–	–	–		3.0	45.2		17.9
Sofemasa/El País	24–30 Sep 1982	2,460	3.2	34.0	3.4	9.8	–	0.3	–	–	–	–	–		1.5	26.6	7.4	24.2
Alef/Grupo 16	5–19 Sep 1982	3,000	6.8	33.1	5.3	7.2	–	0.3	–	–	–	–	–	–	1.7	39.4		25.9
CIS	3–5 Sep 1982	2,400	7.0	27.0	3.0	11.0	–	–	–	–	–	–	–	–	2.0	35.0	9.0	16.0
CIS	1 Sep 1982	1,198	6.7	27.9	2.2	11.6	1.3	–	–	1.0	–	–	–	–	2.8	32.9	9.8	16.3
Sofemasa/El País	24–30 Aug 1982	2,460	5.6	33.5	3.7	7.8	–	0.9	–	–	–	–	–	–	1.6	27.9	6.0	25.7
Metra Seis/Diario 16	7 Aug 1982	?	6.7	39.2	1.7	11.2	–	1.5	–	–	–	–	–	1.9	–	33.3		28.0
Metra Seis/Diario 16	6 Aug 1982	1,857	7.0	37.0	1.7	10.7	1.7	1.4	0.5	0.4	0.4	1.6	0.4	1.9	–	20.9	15.2	26.3
CIS	8–12 Jul 1982	3,185	12.0	29.1	3.5	9.8	1.0	0.4	0.4	1.0	0.4	–	0.3	–	–	28.4	11.6	17.1
CIS	1 Jun 1982	1,188	9.8	30.5	2.5	9.4	1.3	0.5	0.3	0.6	0.2	–	0.3	–	–	30.8	11.9	20.7
CIS	7 May 1982	1,200	12.8	27.7	3.2	7.3	0.7	1.0	1.0	1.0	–	–	1.0	–	–	28.1	14.3	14.9
Emopública/Cambio 16	24 Apr 1982	?	16.0	34.0	4.0	8.0	–	–	–	–	–	–	–	–	–	–	–	18.0
CIS	23–27 Mar 1982	1,200	12.6	24.9	3.2	8.1	1.3	1.0	–	1.3	–	–	–	–	–	33.1	11.8	12.3
CIS	3 Mar 1982	?	13.0	21.0	3.0	6.0	2.0	1.0	1.0	–	–	–	–	–	–	38.0	13.0	8.0
CIS	23–27 Feb 1982	1,200	13.0	30.1	2.5	8.2	1.6	–	0.7	0.5	0.5	–	0.5	–	–	27.3	12.2	17.1
CIS	1 Jan 1982	1,179	11.8	28.4	3.5	8.2	1.3	–	–	0.8	1.0	–	–	–	–	30.6	11.7	16.6
CIS	28–30 Nov 1981	1,200	11.0	25.0	3.0	7.0	1.0	1.0	0.0	1.0	1.0	–	0.0	–	–	35.0	12.0	14.0
CIS	26 Oct–1 Nov 1981	1,201	11.1	28.9	3.0	7.3	1.2	0.0	1.0	0.8	1.0	–	1.0	–	–	32.9	10.8	17.8
CIS	9–11 Sep 1981	1,193	11.6	26.2	2.9	3.3	1.9	–	–	1.9	1.0	–	1.0	–	–	36.2	11.9	14.6
CIS	1 Jul 1981	1,200	13.6	26.5	3.5	4.4	0.8	0.7	0.4	1.2	0.7	–	0.3	–	–	34.9	12.6	12.9
CIS	1 Jun 1981	2,394	13.5	25.4	3.5	4.8	1.0	1.2	0.3	1.3	0.4	0.3	0.2	–	–	25.1	21.3	11.9
CIS	10 May 1981	1,163	15.0	24.5	3.7	4.0	1.7	–	1.0	2.2	1.0	–	–	–	–	35.5	10.0	9.5
CIS	28 Apr–2 May 1981	2,394	14.9	24.0	3.5	3.9	1.0	0.7	0.3	1.3	0.5	–	0.3	–	–	35.2	12.8	9.1
CIS	1 Apr 1981	1,197	14.8	22.9	3.3	4.8	1.3	1.0	1.0	1.0	1.0	–	0.0	–	–	37.1	11.4	8.1
CIS	1 Mar 1981	1,196	13.5	27.2	3.2	5.6	1.3	0.4	0.5	1.8	0.5	–	0.4	–	–	34.6	9.5	13.7
CIS	30 Jan 1981	1,177	12.0	22.0	3.0	5.0	2.0	–	1.0	1.0	–	–	–	–	–	44.0	8.0	10.0
CIS	1 Jan 1981	1,191	13.3	19.6	4.4	4.8	0.6	1.0	0.0	0.9	0.0	–	0.0	–	–	37.8	15.1	6.3
CIS	1 Dec 1980	1,202	13.2	22.2	3.5	4.9	1.4	0.7	0.3	1.1	0.5	–	0.4	–	–	37.0	12.3	9.0
INE	12 Nov 1980	3,457	12.0	18.0	5.0	3.0	–	–	–	–	–	–	–	–	–	42.5	8.8	6.0
CIS	1 Nov 1980	1,200	13.0	21.0	5.0	5.0	1.0	–	1.0	1.0	1.0	–	–	–	–	37.0	12.0	8.0
CIS	1 Oct 1980	?	15.7	16.8	3.3	4.9	1.3	1.0	1.0	1.5	–	–	–	–	–	39.3	12.7	1.1
CIS	1 Sep 1980	1,184	16.5	22.9	4.7	5.5	1.9	1.0	1.0	1.2	–	–	–	–	–	32.1	10.6	6.4
CIS	1 Jul 1980	3,457	13.4	20.2	4.8	4.0	1.2	0.4	–	1.2	0.4	0.4	0.5	–	–	41.2	8.5	6.8
CIS	1 Jun 1980	1,191	15.1	25.3	3.2	5.0	2.0	0.0	1.0	0.9	–	1.0	1.0	–	–	31.9	11.8	10.2
CIS	1 Apr 1980	1,168	16.4	18.8	3.8	4.5	1.9	0.0	1.0	2.2	1.0	–	1.0	–	–	34.3	12.4	2.4
CIS	1 Mar 1980	1,185	18.3	19.7	4.3	3.5	2.1	0.4	1.6	1.5	0.8	–	0.6	–	–	33.7	11.1	1.4
CIS	1 Dec 1979	1,147	20.0	19.0	5.0	3.0	0.9	0.9	0.9	0.9	0.3	–	0.5	–	–	35.0	11.0	1.0
1979 general election	1 Mar 1979	—N/a	23.4	20.4	7.2	4.1	1.8	1.4	1.2	1.1	0.6	0.5	0.3	–	–	—N/a	32.0	3.0

==== Victory preference ====
The table below lists opinion polling on the victory preferences for each party in the event of a general election taking place.

Polling firm/Commissioner	Fieldwork date	Sample size	UCD	PSOE	PCE	AP	CDS	Other/ None	Question	Lead
CIS	1 Oct 1982	1,200	6.0	38.0	3.0	15.0	3.0	2.0	33.0	23.0
CIS	29 Sep–1 Oct 1982	24,793	6.3	35.2	2.6	13.0	2.4	4.2	36.3	22.2
CIS	3–5 Sep 1982	2,400	9.0	36.0	3.0	14.0	4.0	3.0	31.0	22.0
CIS	1 Sep 1982	1,198	7.0	35.0	3.0	14.0	4.0	3.0	34.0	21.0
CIS	8–12 Jul 1982	3,185	11.8	34.5	3.3	11.0	–	3.7	35.6	22.7
CIS	1 Jun 1982	1,188	9.6	37.6	1.6	12.1	–	2.9	36.1	25.5

==== Victory likelihood ====
The table below lists opinion polling on the perceived likelihood of victory for each party in the event of a general election taking place.

Polling firm/Commissioner	Fieldwork date	Sample size	UCD	PSOE	PCE	AP	CDS	Other/ None	Question	Lead
CIS	1 Oct 1982	1,200	2.0	57.0	0.0	5.0	0.0	0.0	36.0	52.0
CIS	29 Sep–1 Oct 1982	24,793	4.4	51.8	0.3	5.5	0.9	0.4	36.7	46.3
CIS	3–5 Sep 1982	2,400	6.0	53.0	0.0	5.0	1.0	0.0	35.0	47.0
CIS	1 Sep 1982	1,198	3.0	53.0	0.0	5.0	1.0	1.0	37.0	48.0
CIS	8–12 Jul 1982	3,185	10.0	49.5	0.3	4.4	–	0.1	35.6	39.5
CIS	1 Jun 1982	1,188	7.4	46.5	0.1	3.4	–	0.3	42.4	39.1
CIS	26 Oct–1 Nov 1981	1,201	14.0	40.0	–	5.0	–	–	41.0	26.0

==== Hypothetical scenarios ====
===== UCD–AP alliance =====
Polling firm/Commissioner	Fieldwork date	Sample size	Turnout	UCD AP	PSOE	PCE	CDS	Lead
UCD	4 Sep 1982	?	?	? 135	? 169	? 12	? 7	?
Tiempo	12 Dec 1981	?	?	32.6; 169	31.4; 126	3.9; 4	–	1.2

== Leadership polling ==
=== Preferred prime minister ===
The table below lists opinion polling on leader preferences to become prime minister.

==== All candidates ====
Polling firm/Commissioner	Fieldwork date	Sample size								Other/ None/ Not care	Question	Lead
Polling firm/Commissioner	Fieldwork date	Sample size	Calvo- Sotelo UCD	Lavilla UCD	González PSOE	Tierno PSOE	Carrillo PCE	Fraga AP	Suárez CDS	Other/ None/ Not care	Question	Lead
Alef/Grupo 16	9–14 Oct 1982	7,000	–	6.1	49.3	–	5.7	19.2	8.7	2.1	8.9	30.1
CIS	1 Oct 1982	1,200	1.0	3.0	37.0	–	2.0	15.0	6.0	–	36.0	22.0
CIS	29 Sep–1 Oct 1982	24,793	–	4.3	37.2	–	2.7	17.1	6.5	–	32.2	20.1
Alef/Grupo 16	25–30 Sep 1982	3,008	–	6.4	46.8	–	4.3	17.9	11.9	3.2	9.6	28.9
CIS	1 Sep 1982	1,198	2.0	3.0	34.0	–	3.0	15.0	7.0	–	36.0	19.0
Emopública/Cambio 16	24 Apr 1982	?	11.3	–	39.8	3.9	–	13.7	5.6	25.7		26.1

==== Suárez vs. González ====
Polling firm/Commissioner	Fieldwork date	Sample size			Other/ None/ Not care	Question	Lead
Polling firm/Commissioner	Fieldwork date	Sample size	Suárez UCD	González PSOE	Other/ None/ Not care	Question	Lead
ICSA–Gallup/Cambio 16	30 Jan 1981	?	26.0	43.0	31.0		17.0
ICSA–Gallup	9–16 Jun 1980	1,002	28.0	46.0	26.0		18.0
VSA	18–22 Mar 1980	3,046	14.6	21.3	–	–	6.7
ICSA–Gallup	Sep 1979	?	31.0	41.0	28.0		10.0

==== Suárez vs. Carrillo ====
Polling firm/Commissioner	Fieldwork date	Sample size			Other/ None/ Not care	Question	Lead
Polling firm/Commissioner	Fieldwork date	Sample size	Suárez UCD	Carrillo PCE	Other/ None/ Not care	Question	Lead
ICSA–Gallup	9–16 Jun 1980	1,002	46.0	25.0	29.0		21.0

=== Approval ratings ===
==== Leopoldo Calvo-Sotelo ====
Polling firm/Commissioner	Fieldwork date	Sample size	Leopoldo Calvo-Sotelo (UCD)			
Polling firm/Commissioner	Fieldwork date	Sample size	check	☒	Question	Net
ICSA–Gallup	5–18 Jul 1982	?	21.0	48.0	31.0	−27.0
ICSA–Gallup	2–22 Nov 1981	?	25.0	46.0	29.0	−21.0
ICSA–Gallup	8 Jul–17 Sep 1981	?	29.0	39.0	32.0	−10.0
ICSA–Gallup	6 May–18 Jun 1981	?	39.0	25.0	36.0	+14.0
ICSA–Gallup	11 Apr–21 May 1981	?	38.0	23.0	39.0	+15.0
CIS	10 May 1981	1,163	36.0	25.0	39.0	+11.0
ICSA–Gallup/Diario 16	4–14 Apr 1981	946	41.0	15.0	44.0	+26.0
ICSA–Gallup/Diario 16	27 Feb–2 Mar 1981	?	25.0	19.0	56.0	+6.0

==== Adolfo Suárez ====
Polling firm/Commissioner	Fieldwork date	Sample size	Adolfo Suárez (UCD)			
Polling firm/Commissioner	Fieldwork date	Sample size	check	☒	Question	Net
ICSA–Gallup/Cambio 16	16–30 Jan 1981	?	26.0	59.0	15.0	−33.0
ICSA–Gallup	3 Nov–14 Dec 1980	?	19.0	46.0	35.0	−27.0
ICSA–Gallup	6 Oct–16 Nov 1980	?	23.0	46.0	31.0	−23.0
ICSA–Gallup	6–19 Oct 1980	?	23.0	48.0	29.0	−25.0
ICSA–Gallup	4 Aug–14 Sep 1980	?	23.0	45.0	32.0	−22.0
ICSA–Gallup	11–21 Mar 1980	3,047	35.0	37.0	28.0	−2.0
