= 1980 vote of no confidence in the government of Adolfo Suárez =

Spanish parliamentary vote

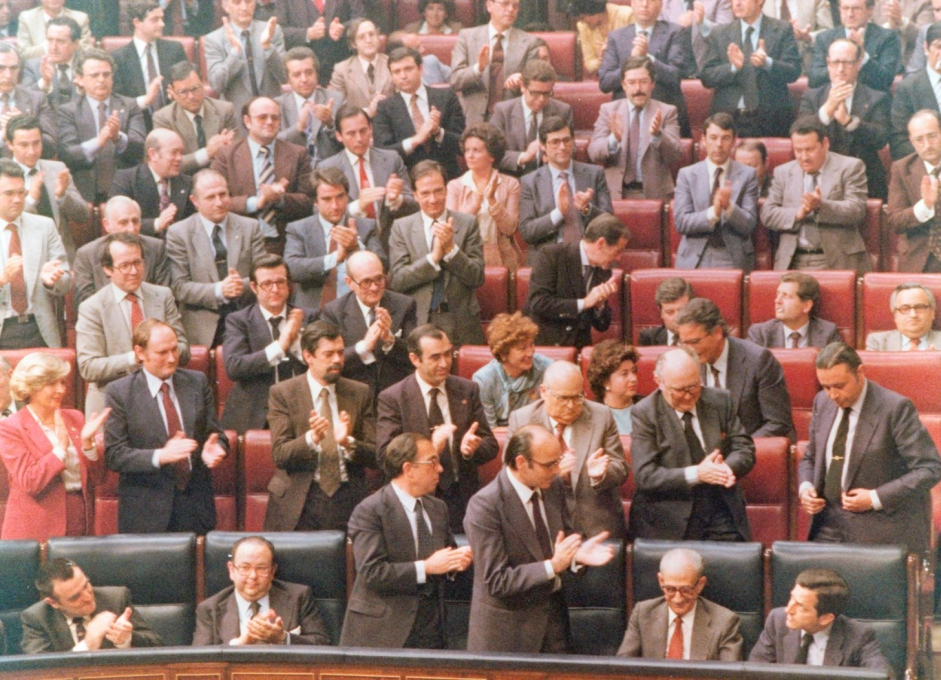
- Prime Minister Adolfo Suárez (seated bottom right), with the UCD parliamentary group during the parliamentary debate on 21 May 1980 in which the motion was announced
- Date: 28–30 May 1980 (2 days)
- Location: Congress of Deputies, Spain
- Type: Motion of no confidence
- Cause: The government's alleged mismanagement, parliamentary solitude and inability to tackle the country's economic situation
- Participants: UCD; PSOE; PCE–PSUC; PSC; CD; CiU; PNV; PSE; PSA–PA; HB; FN; ERC; EE; UPC; PAR; UPN; Independents
- Outcome: Motion rejected

A motion of no confidence in the Spanish government of Adolfo Suárez was debated and voted in the Congress of Deputies between 28 and 30 May 1980. It was brought by Spanish Socialist Workers' Party (PSOE) leader Felipe González.

While the motion was defeated—it was supported by 152 deputies and opposed by 166 of the governing Union of the Democratic Centre (UCD)—it revealed the government's solitude and loss of support since Suárez's investiture in the aftermath of the 1979 general election, not receiving the backing of its erstwhile allies and seeing its management under heavy criticism by other parties throughout the debate. Concurrently, the motion's debate provided a platform for Felipe González to present and defend his political programme to society, as it was broadcast live on radio and deferred on television, which was regarded as leading to an increase in González's credibility and political stand as well as to a favorable dynamic of growing popular support for the PSOE.

== Legal provisions ==
The Spanish Constitution of 1978 required for motions of no confidence to be proposed by at least one-tenth of the Congress of Deputies—35 out of 350. Following the German model, votes of no confidence in Spain were constructive, so the motion was required to include an alternative candidate for prime minister. For a motion of no confidence to be successful, it had to be passed by an absolute majority in the Congress of Deputies. A minimum period of five days from the motion's registration (dubbed as "cooling period") was required to pass before it could come up for a vote, but no maximum was established. Other parties were entitled to submit alternative motions within the first two days from the registration.

1. The Congress of Deputies may challenge Government policy by passing a motion of censure by an absolute majority of its members.
2. The motion of censure must be proposed by at least one tenth of the Deputies, including a candidate for the office of President of the Government.
3. The motion of censure may not be voted on until five days after it has been submitted. During the first two days of this period, alternative motions may be submitted.
4. If the motion of censure is not passed by the Congress, its signatories may not submit another during the same session.

— Article 113 of the Spanish Constitution

Concurrently, the Prime Minister was barred from dissolving the Cortes Generales and calling a general election while a motion of no confidence was pending. If the motion was successful, the incumbent prime minister and their government were required to submit their resignation to the Monarch, while the candidate proposed in the motion was automatically considered to have the confidence of the Congress of Deputies and immediately appointed as prime minister. If unsuccessful, the signatories of the motion were barred from submitting another during the same session.

== Events ==
=== Prelude ===
The motion was announced by González during a parliamentary debate in the Congress of Deputies on 21 May and registered that same day, in a move aimed at obtaining a "moral censure" of the government that caught it and most deputies by surprise. Among the motives given to justify the motion's tabling were the alleged lack of a coherent political project in the government's programme for the construction of the democratic and autonomic state, its inability to tackle the economic situation of the country, its refusal to comply with agreements reached with other political projects or with non-law proposals passed by parliament and its growing parliamentary weakness.

=== Debate and vote ===
Motion of no confidence Congress of Deputies; Nomination of Felipe González (PSOE)
Ballot →	30 May 1980
Required majority →	176 out of 350
Yes: • PSOE (97); • PCE–PSUC (23); • PSC (17); • PSE (6); • PSA–PA (5); • ERC (1); • EE (1); • UPC (1); • Independent (1)	152 / 350
No: • UCD (166)	166 / 350
Abstentions: • CD (9); • CiU (7); • Independents (2); • FN (1); • PAR (1); • UPN (1)	21 / 350
Absentees: • PNV (7); • HB (3); • CiU (1)	11 / 350

== Opinion polls ==
Shown in reverse chronological order, with the most recent first and using the dates when the survey fieldwork was done, as opposed to the date of publication (except in cases where the fieldwork dates are unknown):

Opinion on the motion of no confidence
Polling firm/Commissioner	Fieldwork date	Sample size	Support	Reject	Neither	Question
CIS	30 May 1980	1,188	26.0	28.0	30.0	16.0
