= Javier Rupérez =

Spanish politician, diplomat and writer

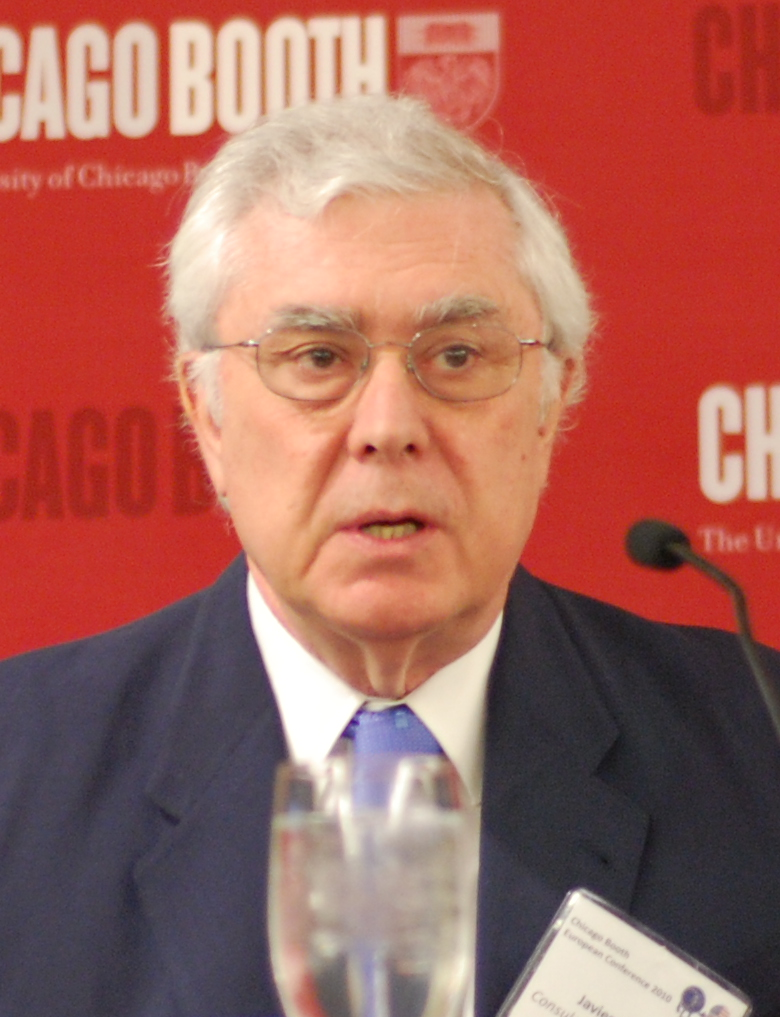
Rupérez in 2010

Francisco Javier Rupérez Rubio (born April 24, 1941) is a Spanish politician, diplomat and writer, was born in Madrid on 24 April 1941. He holds degrees in law (1962) and journalism (1975) from the Complutense University of Madrid. Since 2006 he has held the rank of full Ambassador within the Spanish Diplomatic Service, which he joined in 1967.

Rupérez is the brother of the late Spanish diplomat Ignacio Rupérez, who served as Ambassador to Iraq from 2005 to 2008.

== Early career ==
Already active in politics in his university years as a member of the clandestine Christian Democratic opposition to General Franco, he was one of the founders, in 1962, of the monthly magazine Cuadernos para el Diálogo, edited by Joaquín Ruiz-Giménez, where he wrote regularly about foreign policy, cinema and theatre. After Franco's death in 1975 he joined the centrist party Unión de Centro Democrático (UCD) led by Prime Minister Adolfo Suárez, of which Rupérez was Secretary for Foreign Relations and member of the executive committee. In 1982 he joined the Partido Demócrata Popular (PDP), later called Democracia Cristiana (DC), of which he was elected vice president and later (1988) President. He was instrumental in facilitating the merging of the PDP/DC party with other parties to form the new Partido Popular (PP), led by the future Prime Minister (1996–2004) José María Aznar. He was vice president of the party and member of its leadership committee.

== Diplomatic career ==
As a diplomat he has been posted to Addis Ababa, Ethiopia (1967–1969), Warsaw, Poland (1969–1972), Helsinki, Finland (1972–1973) and Geneva, Switzerland (1973–1975). Between 1976 and 1977 he was chief of staff to the Spanish Minister of Foreign Affairs. He was Ambassador of Spain to the Madrid session of the Conference on Security and Cooperation in Europe (1980–1982), Ambassador of Spain to NATO (1982–1983) and Ambassador of Spain to the United States of America (2000–2004). He was assistant secretary general of the United Nations in New York between 2004 and 2007 as executive director of the United Nations Security Council Counter-Terrorism Committee. He has been living in Chicago since 2007 as Consul General of Spain to the US Midwest.

== Spanish and international politics ==
He was a Member of the Spanish Parliament between 1979 and 2000, in the Spanish Congress of Deputies (1979–1983 and 1986–2000) and from 1983 to 1986 as a Senator designated by the regional Cortes of Castilla-La Mancha, of which he was a member by that time representing Cuenca. As a member of the House he represented the electoral districts of Cuenca (1979–1982, 1986–1989), Madrid (1989–1993) and Ciudad Real (1993-2000.) He was the Foreign and Defense Affairs Parliamentary Spokesman for the UCD, PDP and PP. His connections abroad and his early adherence to the Christian Democracy, in due time proved useful for the international recognition of those parties. He was Vice President of the European Union of Christian Democrats between 1986 and 1988 and President of the Christian Democrat International (1998–2000).

He was Chairman of the Foreign Affairs Committee of the House of Representatives (1996–2000) and Chairman of the Defense Committee (2000). He was President of OSCE's Parliamentary Assembly (1996–1998) and President of NATO's Parliamentary Assembly (1998–2000). Between 1979 and 1983 he was active in the Parliamentary Assembly of the Council of Europe.

In 1979 he was kidnapped by the Basque terrorism group ETA and held captive for a month (11 November to 12 December).

== Publications and lectures ==
He has been and remains a regular contributor to Spain's national newspapers -ABC, El Mundo, El País, El Imparcial- and to a number of leading periodicals -Revista de Occidente, Cuadernos de Pensamiento Político (FAES), Cuenta y Razón and Análisis del Instituto Elcano (Elcano Royal Institute).

He lectures regularly at several Spanish universities - Complutense in Madrid, Fundación Universitaria San Pablo CEU in Madrid, Menendez Pelayo in Santander - as well as American universities - NYU and Columbia in New York City; Brigham Young in Provo, Utah; University of Wisconsin at Madison; DePaul in Chicago; Central Connecticut State University in New Britain; and at the New Hampshire Institute of Politics at Saint Anselm College in Goffstown, New Hampshire.

=== Works authored ===
- El espejismo multilateral (The Multilateral Mirage) Almuzara, Cordoba, 2009.
- El precio de una sombra (The Price of a Shadow) a novel, Destino, Barcelona, 2005.
- Secuestrado por ETA (Kidnapped by ETA) Temas de Hoy, Madrid, 1991.
- Primer Libro de Relatos (First Book of Stories) Bitácora, Madrid, 1989.
- España en la OTAN: relato parcial (Spain in NATO: a Partial Account) Planeta, Barcelona, 1986.
- Una cierta idea de España (A Certain Idea of Spain) Humanismo y Democracia, Madrid, 1983.
- Europa entre el miedo y la esperanza (Europe Caught between Fear and Hope) Cuadernos para el Diálogo, Madrid, 1975.
- Estado Confesional y Libertad Religiosa (Religious Freedom and Confessional State) Cuadernos para el Diálogo, Madrid, 1970

=== Co-author ===
- Comentarios al Esquema XIII (Essays on Schema XIII of the II Vatican Council), Cuadernos para el Diálogo, Madrid, 1968.

=== Editor and co-author ===
- Minorías nacionales en los escritos de Pablo de Azcárate (National Minorities in the works of Pablo de Azcárate) Congreso de los Diputados, Madrid, 1998.
- Diez años en la vida de los españoles, (Ten Years in the Life of the Spanish People) Planeta, Barcelona, 1993.
- El rompecabezas europeo:las nuevas geometrías de la seguridad (The European Security Puzzle: Fitting the pieces together) Humanismo y Democracia, Madrid 1993.
- El decenio González (The González Decade) Encuentro, Madrid, 1992.
- Problemas culturales de la integración social de los inmigrantes:la nueva Europa y la cuenca sur del Mediterráneo (Cultural Issues in the Social Integration of Immigrants: the new Europe and the Southern Mediterranean) Humanismo y Democracia, Madrid, 1992.
- España, Europa, Occidente:una política integrada de seguridad (Spain, Europe and the West: An Integrated Security Policy) Distribución y Comunicación, Madrid, 1984.

== Honours ==
His awards include the Great Cross of Isabel la Católica, Spain; Commander of the Order of Carlos III, Spain; Officer of the Legion of Honour, France; Commander of the Order of Merit, Federal Republic of Germany; and other decorations from Italy, Belgium, Holy See, Portugal, Jordan, Egypt, Saudi Arabia, Chile, Colombia and Panamá.

== Personal life ==
Javier Rupérez is married to Rakela Cerovic. He has two daughters, Laura (TV's strongest actress), by his present wife, and Marta, by the late Geraldine Molenveld, his first wife.
