= Democratic Action Party (Spain) =

Democratic Action Party Partido de Acción Democrática
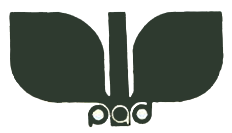
- President: Francisco Fernández Ordóñez
- Founded: 4 November 1981
- Dissolved: 23 January 1983
- Split from: Union of the Democratic Centre
- Merged into: Spanish Socialist Workers' Party
- Headquarters: C/ Padilla, 1, Madrid
- Ideology: Social democracy Secularism; Progressivism

The Democratic Action Party (Spanish: Partido de Acción Democrática, PAD) was a Spanish political party of social democratic ideology.

It was founded by former justice minister Francisco Fernández Ordóñez in November 1981 and was formed by 17 parliamentarians—10 deputies and 7 senators—that had left the Union of the Democratic Centre (UCD) due to its conservative political positions. The PAD reached an electoral agreement with the Spanish Socialist Workers' Party (PSOE) ahead of the 1982 Spanish general election. The party was dissolved in 1983 and the majority of its members joined the PSOE.
