= People's Democratic Party (Spain) =

Spanish political party (1982–1989)

People's Democratic Party Partido Demócrata Popular
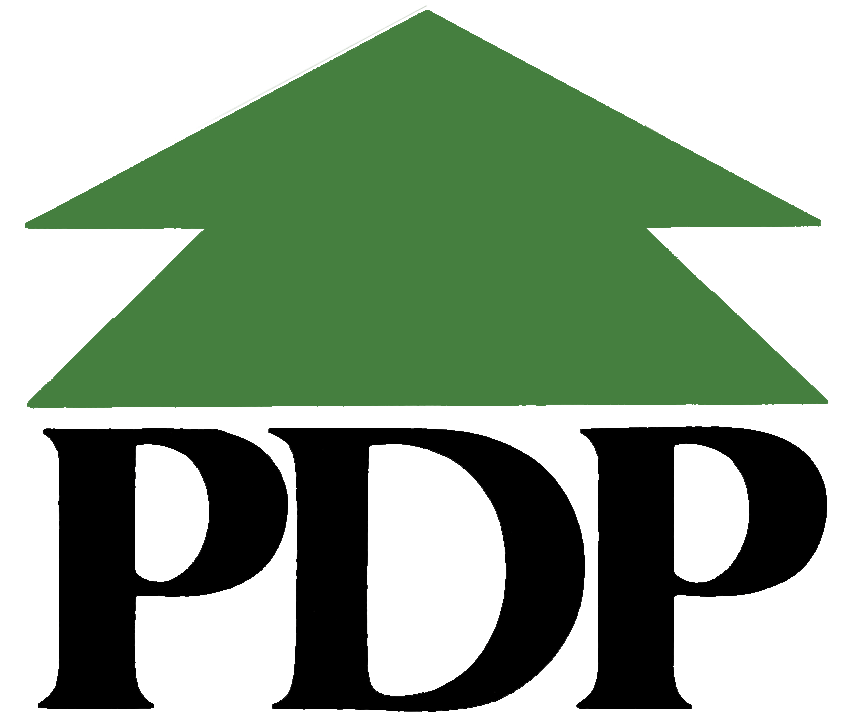
- Abbreviation: PDP
- Founder: Óscar Alzaga
- Founded: 21 July 1982
- Dissolved: 4 June 1989
- Split from: Union of the Democratic Centre
- Merged into: People's Party
- Ideology: Christian democracy
- Political position: Centre-right
- National affiliation: People's Coalition (1982–1986)
- European affiliation: European People's Party
- International affiliation: International Democrat Union

The People's Democratic Party (Spanish: Partido Demócrata Popular, PDP), renamed as Christian Democracy (Spanish: Democracia Cristiana, DC) from March 1988 until it merged into the People's Party in June 1989, was a Christian-democratic political party in Spain.

== History ==
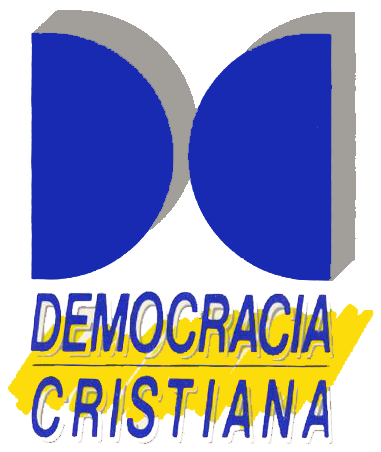
Logo between 1988 and 1989.

In August 1982, 13 deputies under the leadership of Óscar Alzaga split from the Union of the Democratic Centre (UCD) and founded the PDP, entering into an alliance with the People's Alliance (AP), which received the second largest number of votes in the 1982 and 1986 general elections. The party president was Óscar Alzaga until 1987, then Javier Rupérez led the party into a merger with AP and Liberal Party (PL). Jaime Mayor Oreja, subsequently a leading PP politician, was a leading member of PDP.

The PDP was a member of the European People's Party from 1986 onwards.

In 1988, the party was renamed Christian Democracy (Democracia Cristiana). In 1989, the party, along with the Popular Alliance and the Liberal Party, merged with others to create the new People's Party (PP).

== Electoral performance ==
=== Cortes Generales ===
Cortes Generales
Election	Leading candidate	Congress			Senate			Gov.
Election	Leading candidate	Votes	%	Seats	Votes	%	Seats	Gov.
1982	Manuel Fraga	Within AP–PDP		15 / 350	Within AP–PDP		10 / 208	No
1986	Manuel Fraga	Within AP–PDP–PL		21 / 350	Within AP–PDP–PL		11 / 208	No

=== European Parliament ===
European Parliament
Election	Leading candidate	Votes	%	Seats	EP Group
1987	Javier Rupérez	170,866	0.9 (#12)	0 / 60	—

== See also ==
- Category:People's Democratic Party (Spain) politicians
