= Communist Movement of Asturias =

Communist Movement of Asturias Movimientu Comunista d'Asturies
- Leader: José Uría
- Founded: 1976; 50 years ago
- Dissolved: 1991; 35 years ago
- Merged into: Lliberación
- Newspaper: Servir al Pueblo; Andecha Xoven
- Youth wing: Revolutionary Youth of Asturias
- Union affiliation: Corriente Sindical d'Izquierda
- Ideology: Communism; Marxism-Leninism; Asturianism; Feminism; Until 1983: Maoism
- Political position: Far-left
- National affiliation: Communist Movement

Communist Movement of Asturias (in Asturian: Movimientu Comunista d'Asturies. MCA) was the federated political party of the Communist Movement (MC) in Asturias. The MCA was founded in 1976.

== Ideology ==
Originally the MCA was a Maoist party, inspired by the Chinese Cultural Revolution, but over the years, specially after 1981–82, the organization gradually abandoned its previous ideologies (Orthodox Marxism, Leninism, Maoism) in favour of more heterodox forms of Marxism. The party was also supportive of the Feminist, Asturian language, LGBT and Insurbordinate social movements.

== History ==
The MCA campaigned against the 1978 Spanish Constitution. In 1979 the Organization of the Communist Left of Asturias joined the MCA.

=== Lliberación ===
In 1991, after several years of collaboration, the MCA and the LCR decided to merge, resulting in Lliberación. In 1993 the members of the LCR left Lliberación. Lliberación collaborated with the United Left of Asturias since then, gaining one seat in the Parliament of Asturias in 2003, held by Paloma Uría, inside that coalition. Lliberación disappeared in 2010.
