= Cuenca (Congress of Deputies constituency) =

Electoral constituency in Spain

Coordinates: 40°00′N 2°00′W

- Congress of Deputies; Electoral constituency
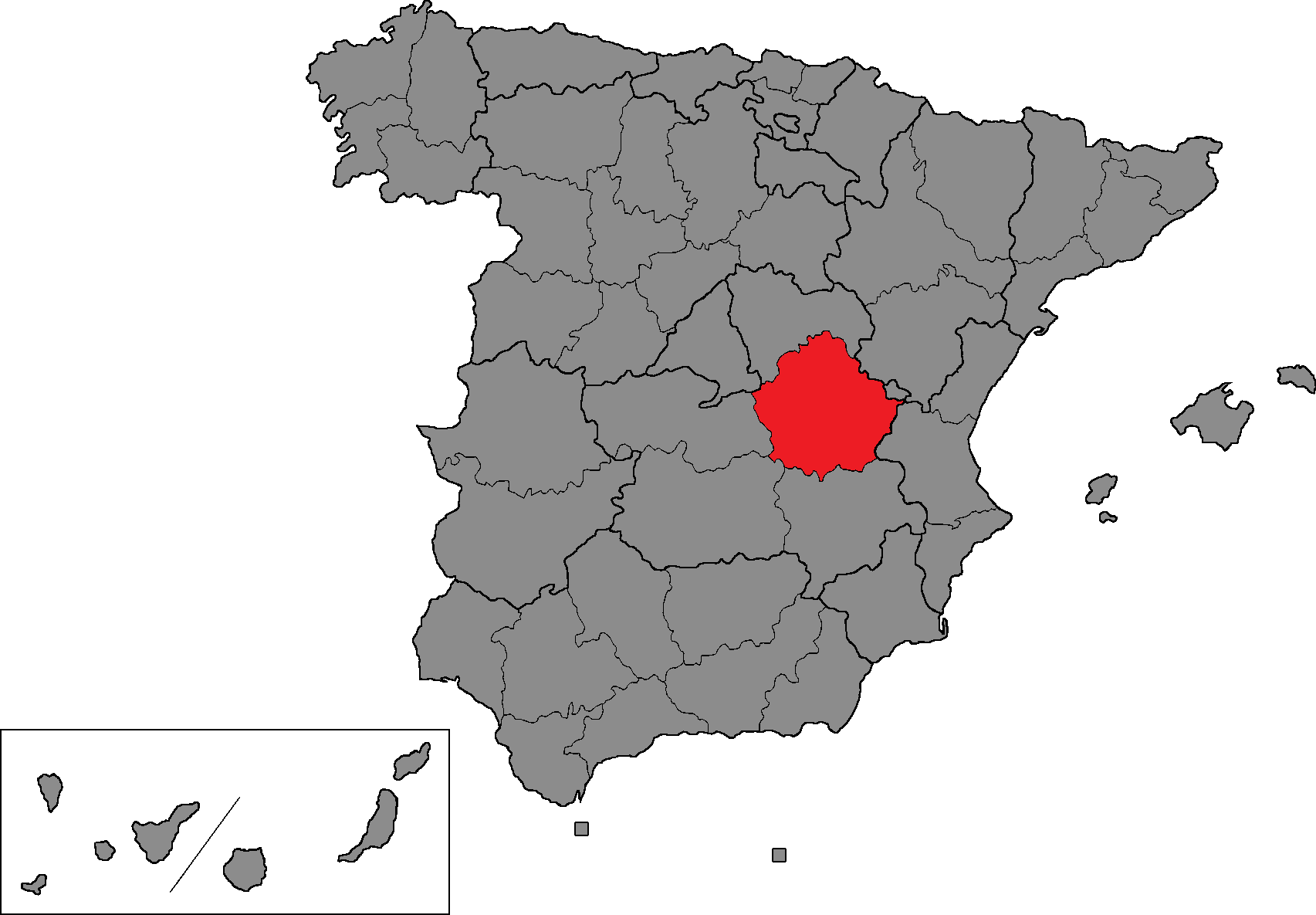
- Location of Cuenca within Spain
- Province: Cuenca
- Autonomous community: Castilla–La Mancha
- Population: ▲197,606 (2024)
- Electorate: ▼152,694 (2023)
- Major settlements: Cuenca

Current constituency
- Created: 1977
- Seats: 4 (1977–1982); 3 (1986–present)
- Members: PP (2); PSOE (1)

Cuenca is one of the 52 constituencies represented in the Congress of Deputies, the lower chamber of the Spanish parliament, the Cortes Generales. The constituency (whose boundaries correspond to those of the homonymous province) currently elects three deputies. The electoral system uses the D'Hondt method and closed-list proportional voting, with a minimum threshold of three percent.

== Electoral system ==
The constituency was created as per the Political Reform Law and was first contested in the 1977 general election. The Law provided for the provinces of Spain to be established as multi-member districts in the Congress of Deputies, with this regulation being maintained under the Spanish Constitution of 1978. Additionally, the Constitution requires for any modification of the provincial limits to be approved under an organic law, needing an absolute majority in the Cortes Generales.

Voting is based on universal suffrage, comprising all Spanish nationals over 18 years of age with full political rights, provided that they have not been deprived of the right to vote by a final sentence. The only exception was in 1977, when this was limited to nationals over 21 years of age and in full enjoyment of their political and civil rights. Amendments in 2011 required non-resident citizens to apply for voting, a system known as "begged" voting (Spanish: Voto rogado). which was abolished in 2022. Further, amendments in 2018 granted the right to vote to those legally incapacitated. The Congress of Deputies has a minimum of 300 and a maximum of 400 seats, with electoral provisions fixing its size at 350. Of these, 348 are elected in 50 multi-member constituencies corresponding to the provinces of Spain—each of which is assigned an initial minimum of two seats and the remaining 248 distributed in proportion to population—using the D'Hondt method and closed-list proportional voting, with a three percent-threshold of valid votes (including blank ballots) in each constituency. The remaining two seats are allocated to Ceuta and Melilla as single-member districts elected by plurality voting. The use of this electoral method may result in a higher effective threshold depending on district magnitude and vote distribution. The law does not provide for by-elections to fill vacant seats; instead, any vacancies arising after the proclamation of candidates and during the legislative term are filled by the next candidates on the party lists or, when required, by designated substitutes.

The electoral law allows for parties and federations registered in the interior ministry, alliances and groupings of electors to present lists of candidates. Parties and federations intending to form an alliance are required to inform the relevant electoral commission within 10 days of the election call—15 before 1985—whereas groupings of electors need to secure the signature of at least one percent of the electorate in the constituencies for which they seek election—one permille of the electorate, with a compulsory minimum of 500 signatures, until 1985—disallowing electors from signing for more than one list. Also since 2011, parties, federations or alliances that have not obtained a mandate in either chamber of the Cortes at the preceding election are required to secure the signature of at least 0.1 percent of electors in the aforementioned constituencies. Amendments in 2007 required a balanced composition of men and women in the electoral lists, so that candidates of either sex made up at least 40 percent of the total composition; further amendments in 2024 required the use of a zipper system.

== Deputies ==
Deputies 1977–present
Key to parties PSOE UCD PP CP AP
Legislature	Election	Distribution
Constituent	1977	1 / 3
1st	1979	1 / 3
2nd	1982	2 / 2
3rd	1986	2 / 1
4th	1989	2 / 1
5th	1993	1 / 2
6th	1996	1 / 2
7th	2000	1 / 2
8th	2004	1 / 2
9th	2008	1 / 2
10th	2011	1 / 2
11th	2015	1 / 2
12th	2016	1 / 2
13th	2019 (Apr)	2 / 1
14th	2019 (Nov)	2 / 1
15th	2023	1 / 2

== General elections ==
=== 2026 ===
Summary of the 29 November 2026 Congress of Deputies election results in Cuenca
Parties and alliances	Popular vote			Seats	
Parties and alliances	Votes	%	±pp	Total	+/−
People's Party (PP)					
Spanish Socialist Workers' Party (PSOE)					
Vox (Vox)					
Broad Front (FA)^{1}			n/a		
We Can (Podemos)^{1}			n/a		
Animalist Party with the Environment (PACMA)					
Workers' Front (FO)					
For a Fairer World (M+J)					
Communist Party of the Workers of Spain (PCTE)					
The Party is Over (SALF)			New		
Blank ballots					
Total				3	±0
Valid votes					
Invalid votes					
Votes cast / turnout					
Abstentions					
Registered voters	151,410				
Sources
Footnotes: ^{1} Within the Unite alliance in the 2023 election.

=== 2023 ===
Summary of the 23 July 2023 Congress of Deputies election results in Cuenca
Parties and alliances	Popular vote			Seats	
Parties and alliances	Votes	%	±pp	Total	+/−
People's Party (PP)	45,255	39.76	+8.86	2	+1
Spanish Socialist Workers' Party (PSOE)	42,528	37.37	+0.10	1	–1
Vox (Vox)	17,700	15.55	–2.88	0	±0
Unite (Sumar)^{1}	6,325	5.56	–1.34	0	±0
Animalist Party with the Environment (PACMA)^{2}	387	0.34	–0.16	0	±0
Workers' Front (FO)	207	0.18	New	0	±0
Blank Seats to Leave Empty Seats (EB)	168	0.15	New	0	±0
For a Fairer World (PUM+J)	111	0.10	–0.02	0	±0
Communist Party of the Workers of Spain (PCTE)	100	0.09	+0.03	0	±0
Zero Cuts (Recortes Cero)	58	0.05	–0.06	0	±0
Blank ballots	969	0.85	–0.07		
Total	113,808			3	±0
Valid votes	113,808	98.72	±0.00		
Invalid votes	1,472	1.28	±0.00		
Votes cast / turnout	115,280	75.50	+3.93		
Abstentions	37,414	24.50	–3.93		
Registered voters	152,694				
Sources
Footnotes: ^{1} Unite results are compared to United We Can totals in the November 2019 election.; ^{2} Animalist Party with the Environment results are compared to Animalist Party Against Mistreatment of Animals totals in the November 2019 election.

=== November 2019 ===
Summary of the 10 November 2019 Congress of Deputies election results in Cuenca
Parties and alliances	Popular vote			Seats	
Parties and alliances	Votes	%	±pp	Total	+/−
Spanish Socialist Workers' Party (PSOE)	40,670	37.27	+1.59	2	±0
People's Party (PP)	33,721	30.90	+4.13	1	±0
Vox (Vox)	20,108	18.43	+4.41	0	±0
United We Can (Podemos–IU)	7,529	6.90	–1.03	0	±0
Citizens–Party of the Citizenry (Cs)	5,094	4.67	–9.11	0	±0
Animalist Party Against Mistreatment of Animals (PACMA)	545	0.50	–0.15	0	±0
For a Fairer World (PUM+J)	129	0.12	+0.03	0	±0
Zero Cuts–Green Group–PCAS–TC (Recortes Cero–GV–PCAS–TC)	125	0.11	±0.00	0	±0
Communist Party of the Peoples of Spain (PCPE)	83	0.08	New	0	±0
Communist Party of the Workers of Spain (PCTE)	66	0.06	–0.01	0	±0
Libertarian Party (P–LIB)	47	0.04	–0.01	0	±0
Blank ballots	1,002	0.92	+0.07		
Total	109,119			3	±0
Valid votes	109,119	98.72	+0.04		
Invalid votes	1,418	1.28	–0.04		
Votes cast / turnout	110,537	71.57	–6.57		
Abstentions	43,904	28.43	+6.57		
Registered voters	154,441				

=== April 2019 ===
Summary of the 28 April 2019 Congress of Deputies election results in Cuenca
Parties and alliances	Popular vote			Seats	
Parties and alliances	Votes	%	±pp	Total	+/−
Spanish Socialist Workers' Party (PSOE)	42,654	35.68	+5.96	2	+1
People's Party (PP)	31,997	26.77	–18.98	1	–1
Vox (Vox)	16,755	14.02	+13.78	0	±0
Citizens–Party of the Citizenry (Cs)	16,467	13.78	+4.40	0	±0
United We Can (Podemos–IU–Equo)	9,482	7.93	–5.24	0	±0
Animalist Party Against Mistreatment of Animals (PACMA)	776	0.65	–0.03	0	±0
Zero Cuts–Green Group–PCAS–TC (Recortes Cero–GV–PCAS–TC)	135	0.11	±0.00	0	±0
For a Fairer World (PUM+J)	109	0.09	New	0	±0
Communist Party of the Workers of Spain (PCTE)	84	0.07	New	0	±0
Libertarian Party (P–LIB)	56	0.05	New	0	±0
Blank ballots	1,015	0.85	+0.14		
Total	119,530			3	±0
Valid votes	119,530	98.68	–0.24		
Invalid votes	1,597	1.32	+0.24		
Votes cast / turnout	121,127	78.14	+3.94		
Abstentions	33,887	21.86	–3.94		
Registered voters	155,014				

=== 2016 ===
Summary of the 26 June 2016 Congress of Deputies election results in Cuenca
Parties and alliances	Popular vote			Seats	
Parties and alliances	Votes	%	±pp	Total	+/−
People's Party (PP)	53,004	45.75	+3.85	2	±0
Spanish Socialist Workers' Party (PSOE)	34,426	29.72	–0.85	1	±0
United We Can (Podemos–IU–Equo)^{1}	15,263	13.17	–1.48	0	±0
Citizens–Party of the Citizenry (C's)	10,868	9.38	–1.40	0	±0
Animalist Party Against Mistreatment of Animals (PACMA)	785	0.68	+0.24	0	±0
Vox (Vox)	274	0.24	–0.05	0	±0
Union, Progress and Democracy (UPyD)	195	0.17	–0.21	0	±0
Zero Cuts–Green Group (Recortes Cero–GV)	130	0.11	–0.03	0	±0
Communist Party of the Peoples of Spain (PCPE)	81	0.07	–0.01	0	±0
Blank ballots	823	0.71	–0.06		
Total	115,849			3	±0
Valid votes	115,849	98.92	+0.05		
Invalid votes	1,269	1.08	–0.05		
Votes cast / turnout	117,118	74.20	–2.88		
Abstentions	40,717	25.80	+2.88		
Registered voters	157,835				
Sources
Footnotes: ^{1} United We Can results are compared to the combined totals of We Can and United Left–Popular Unity in Common in the 2015 election.

=== 2015 ===
Summary of the 20 December 2015 Congress of Deputies election results in Cuenca
Parties and alliances	Popular vote			Seats	
Parties and alliances	Votes	%	±pp	Total	+/−
People's Party (PP)	50,736	41.90	–14.01	2	±0
Spanish Socialist Workers' Party (PSOE)	37,019	30.57	–2.44	1	±0
We Can (Podemos)	14,113	11.65	New	0	±0
Citizens–Party of the Citizenry (C's)	13,049	10.78	New	0	±0
United Left–Popular Unity in Common (IU–UPeC)	3,628	3.00	–1.77	0	±0
Animalist Party Against Mistreatment of Animals (PACMA)	537	0.44	+0.20	0	±0
Union, Progress and Democracy (UPyD)	464	0.38	–3.19	0	±0
Vox (Vox)	356	0.29	New	0	±0
Zero Cuts–Green Group (Recortes Cero–GV)	165	0.14	New	0	±0
Communist Party of the Peoples of Spain (PCPE)	97	0.08	New	0	±0
Blank ballots	931	0.77	–0.62		
Total	121,095			3	±0
Valid votes	121,095	98.87	+0.33		
Invalid votes	1,382	1.13	–0.33		
Votes cast / turnout	122,477	77.08	–0.56		
Abstentions	36,409	22.92	+0.56		
Registered voters	158,886				

=== 2011 ===
Summary of the 20 November 2011 Congress of Deputies election results in Cuenca
Parties and alliances	Popular vote			Seats	
Parties and alliances	Votes	%	±pp	Total	+/−
People's Party (PP)	69,939	55.91	+6.07	2	±0
Spanish Socialist Workers' Party (PSOE)	41,293	33.01	–12.19	1	±0
United Left of Castilla–La Mancha–The Greens: Plural Left (IUCLM–LV)	5,968	4.77	+2.39	0	±0
Union, Progress and Democracy (UPyD)	4,468	3.57	+2.81	0	±0
Equo (Equo)	802	0.64	New	0	±0
Animalist Party Against Mistreatment of Animals (PACMA)	306	0.24	New	0	±0
Liberal Democratic Centre (CDL)	178	0.14	New	0	±0
For a Fairer World (PUM+J)	157	0.13	+0.07	0	±0
Castilian Party (PCAS)^{1}	154	0.12	+0.06	0	±0
Communist Unification of Spain (UCE)	90	0.07	New	0	±0
Blank ballots	1,737	1.39	+0.44		
Total	125,092			3	±0
Valid votes	125,092	98.54	–0.70		
Invalid votes	1,853	1.46	+0.70		
Votes cast / turnout	126,945	77.64	–3.88		
Abstentions	36,555	22.36	+3.88		
Registered voters	163,500				
Sources
Footnotes: ^{1} Castilian Party results are compared to Commoners' Land totals in the 2008 election.

=== 2008 ===
Summary of the 9 March 2008 Congress of Deputies election results in Cuenca
Parties and alliances	Popular vote			Seats	
Parties and alliances	Votes	%	±pp	Total	+/−
People's Party (PP)	66,282	49.84	+0.11	2	±0
Spanish Socialist Workers' Party (PSOE)	60,108	45.20	–0.18	1	±0
United Left–Alternative (IU)	3,168	2.38	–0.06	0	±0
Union, Progress and Democracy (UPyD)	1,011	0.76	New	0	±0
The Greens of Europe (LVdE)	313	0.24	New	0	±0
Social Democratic Party (PSD)	123	0.09	New	0	±0
Independents for Cuenca (ixC)	100	0.08	New	0	±0
Citizens for Blank Votes (CenB)	95	0.07	–0.06	0	±0
For a Fairer World (PUM+J)	86	0.06	New	0	±0
Commoners' Land (TC)	83	0.06	–0.04	0	±0
Communist Party of the Peoples of Spain (PCPE)	60	0.05	–0.01	0	±0
Spanish Phalanx of the CNSO (FE de las JONS)	60	0.05	±0.00	0	±0
Citizens–Party of the Citizenry (C's)	58	0.04	New	0	±0
Spanish Alternative (AES)	41	0.03	New	0	±0
Family and Life Party (PFyV)	38	0.03	–0.07	0	±0
National Democracy (DN)	29	0.02	–0.03	0	±0
Humanist Party (PH)	28	0.02	–0.06	0	±0
Authentic Phalanx (FA)	25	0.02	–0.01	0	±0
Spain 2000 (E–2000)	22	0.02	New	0	±0
Blank ballots	1,259	0.95	–0.61		
Total	132,989			3	±0
Valid votes	132,989	99.24	+0.06		
Invalid votes	1,015	0.76	–0.06		
Votes cast / turnout	134,004	81.52	+0.07		
Abstentions	30,383	18.48	–0.07		
Registered voters	164,387				

=== 2004 ===
Summary of the 14 March 2004 Congress of Deputies election results in Cuenca
Parties and alliances	Popular vote			Seats	
Parties and alliances	Votes	%	±pp	Total	+/−
People's Party (PP)	66,515	49.73	–3.62	2	±0
Spanish Socialist Workers' Party (PSOE)	60,697	45.38	+4.22	1	±0
United Left–Left of Castilla–La Mancha (IU–ICAM)	3,258	2.44	–0.49	0	±0
Democratic and Social Centre (CDS)	191	0.14	–0.09	0	±0
Commoners' Land–Castilian Nationalist Party (TC–PNC)	181	0.14	–0.08	0	±0
Citizens for Blank Votes (CenB)	171	0.13	New	0	±0
Family and Life Party (PFyV)	129	0.10	New	0	±0
Humanist Party (PH)	112	0.08	New	0	±0
Republican Left (IR)	91	0.07	New	0	±0
Communist Party of the Peoples of Spain (PCPE)	84	0.06	New	0	±0
Spanish Phalanx of the CNSO (FE de las JONS)	62	0.05	New	0	±0
National Democracy (DN)	61	0.05	New	0	±0
Authentic Phalanx (FA)	46	0.03	New	0	±0
Republican Social Movement (MSR)	37	0.03	New	0	±0
The Phalanx (FE)	34	0.03	–0.06	0	±0
Blank ballots	2,091	1.56	+0.28		
Total	133,760			3	±0
Valid votes	133,760	99.18	+0.04		
Invalid votes	1,102	0.82	–0.04		
Votes cast / turnout	134,862	81.45	+2.80		
Abstentions	30,714	18.55	–2.80		
Registered voters	165,576				

=== 2000 ===
Summary of the 12 March 2000 Congress of Deputies election results in Cuenca
Parties and alliances	Popular vote			Seats	
Parties and alliances	Votes	%	±pp	Total	+/−
People's Party (PP)	69,688	53.35	+3.14	2	±0
Spanish Socialist Workers' Party–Progressives (PSOE–p)	53,762	41.16	–1.23	1	±0
United Left (IU)	3,823	2.93	–2.68	0	±0
The Greens–Green Group (LV–GV)	605	0.46	New	0	±0
Centrist Union–Democratic and Social Centre (UC–CDS)	303	0.23	–0.20	0	±0
Commoners' Land–Castilian Nationalist Party (TC–PNC)	292	0.22	+0.07	0	±0
The Phalanx (FE)	114	0.09	New	0	±0
Party of Self-employed, Retirees and Independents (EL–PAPI)	100	0.08	New	0	±0
Spanish Democratic Party (PADE)	67	0.05	New	0	±0
Natural Law Party (PLN)	64	0.05	New	0	±0
Republican Action (AR)	61	0.05	New	0	±0
Carlist Party (PC)	39	0.03	New	0	±0
Spain 2000 Platform (ES2000)	33	0.03	New	0	±0
Blank ballots	1,670	1.28	+0.40		
Total	130,621			3	±0
Valid votes	130,621	99.14	–0.18		
Invalid votes	1,127	0.86	+0.18		
Votes cast / turnout	131,748	78.65	–4.50		
Abstentions	35,773	21.35	+4.50		
Registered voters	167,521				

=== 1996 ===
Summary of the 3 March 1996 Congress of Deputies election results in Cuenca
Parties and alliances	Popular vote			Seats	
Parties and alliances	Votes	%	±pp	Total	+/−
People's Party (PP)	70,199	50.21	+3.25	2	±0
Spanish Socialist Workers' Party (PSOE)	59,261	42.39	–1.19	1	±0
United Left–Left of Castilla–La Mancha (IU–ICAM)	7,844	5.61	+0.48	0	±0
Centrist Union (UC)	601	0.43	–1.99	0	±0
Regionalist Party of Castilla–La Mancha (PRCM)	270	0.19	New	0	±0
Commoners' Land–Castilian Nationalist Party (TC–PNC)	216	0.15	–0.11	0	±0
Workers' Revolutionary Party (PRT)	89	0.06	New	0	±0
Humanist Party (PH)	88	0.06	+0.05	0	±0
Blank ballots	1,235	0.88	+0.10		
Total	139,803			3	±0
Valid votes	139,803	99.32	–0.12		
Invalid votes	957	0.68	+0.12		
Votes cast / turnout	140,760	83.15	+0.72		
Abstentions	28,528	16.85	–0.72		
Registered voters	169,288				

=== 1993 ===
Summary of the 6 June 1993 Congress of Deputies election results in Cuenca
Parties and alliances	Popular vote			Seats	
Parties and alliances	Votes	%	±pp	Total	+/−
People's Party (PP)	64,408	46.96	+7.93	2	+1
Spanish Socialist Workers' Party (PSOE)	59,763	43.58	–2.29	1	–1
United Left (IU)	7,041	5.13	+0.79	0	±0
Democratic and Social Centre (CDS)	3,325	2.42	–4.76	0	±0
The Greens (Verdes)^{1}	497	0.36	+0.12	0	±0
Commoners' Land–Castilian Nationalist Party (TC–PNC)	361	0.26	New	0	±0
The Ecologists (LE)	235	0.17	–0.27	0	±0
Ruiz-Mateos Group–European Democratic Alliance (ARM–ADE)	232	0.17	–0.42	0	±0
Castilianist Union (UC)	124	0.09	New	0	±0
Natural Law Party (PLN)	51	0.04	New	0	±0
Humanist Party (PH)	40	0.03	–0.02	0	±0
Communist Unification of Spain (UCE)	0	0.00	New	0	±0
Blank ballots	1,064	0.78	+0.16		
Total	137,141			3	±0
Valid votes	137,141	99.44	+0.10		
Invalid votes	777	0.56	–0.10		
Votes cast / turnout	137,918	82.43	+6.44		
Abstentions	29,393	17.57	–6.44		
Registered voters	167,311				
Sources
Footnotes: ^{1} The Greens results are compared to The Greens–Green List totals in the 1989 election.

=== 1989 ===
Summary of the 29 October 1989 Congress of Deputies election results in Cuenca
Parties and alliances	Popular vote			Seats	
Parties and alliances	Votes	%	±pp	Total	+/−
Spanish Socialist Workers' Party (PSOE)	58,465	45.87	+0.57	2	±0
People's Party (PP)^{1}	49,748	39.03	+0.06	1	±0
Democratic and Social Centre (CDS)	9,149	7.18	–1.55	0	±0
United Left (IU)	5,529	4.34	+1.88	0	±0
Ruiz-Mateos Group (Ruiz-Mateos)	750	0.59	New	0	±0
Workers' Party of Spain–Communist Unity (PTE–UC)^{2}	649	0.51	–0.65	0	±0
The Greens–Green List (LV–LV)	615	0.48	New	0	±0
The Ecologist Greens (LVE)	562	0.44	New	0	±0
Workers' Socialist Party (PST)	520	0.41	+0.14	0	±0
Spanish Phalanx of the CNSO (FE–JONS)	256	0.20	–0.26	0	±0
Alliance for the Republic (AxR)^{3}	159	0.12	–0.05	0	±0
Communist Party of the Peoples of Spain (PCPE)	150	0.12	New	0	±0
Humanist Party (PH)	63	0.05	New	0	±0
Centrist Unity–Democratic Spanish Party (PED)	46	0.04	New	0	±0
Blank ballots	785	0.62	+0.02		
Total	127,446			3	±0
Valid votes	127,446	99.34	+0.71		
Invalid votes	845	0.66	–0.71		
Votes cast / turnout	128,291	75.99	+1.05		
Abstentions	40,544	24.01	–1.05		
Registered voters	168,835				
Sources
Footnotes: ^{1} People's Party results are compared to People's Coalition totals in the 1986 election.; ^{2} Workers' Party of Spain–Communist Unity results are compared to Communists' Unity Board totals in the 1986 election.; ^{3} Alliance for the Republic results are compared to Internationalist Socialist Workers' Party totals in the 1986 election.

=== 1986 ===
Summary of the 22 June 1986 Congress of Deputies election results in Cuenca
Parties and alliances	Popular vote			Seats	
Parties and alliances	Votes	%	±pp	Total	+/−
Spanish Socialist Workers' Party (PSOE)	57,361	45.30	+0.36	2	±0
People's Coalition (AP–PDP–PL)^{1}	49,339	38.97	+7.13	1	–1
Democratic and Social Centre (CDS)	11,054	8.73	+6.92	0	±0
United Left (IU)^{2}	3,119	2.46	–0.75	0	±0
Democratic Reformist Party (PRD)	1,870	1.48	New	0	±0
Communists' Unity Board (MUC)	1,475	1.16	New	0	±0
Spanish Phalanx of the CNSO (FE–JONS)	587	0.46	New	0	±0
Workers' Socialist Party (PST)	346	0.27	New	0	±0
Communist Unification of Spain (UCE)	307	0.24	+0.13	0	±0
Internationalist Socialist Workers' Party (POSI)	209	0.17	New	0	±0
Republican Popular Unity (UPR)	187	0.15	New	0	±0
Blank ballots	763	0.60	+0.06		
Total	126,617			3	–1
Valid votes	126,617	98.63	+0.40		
Invalid votes	1,758	1.37	–0.40		
Votes cast / turnout	128,375	74.94	–8.18		
Abstentions	42,920	25.06	+8.18		
Registered voters	171,295				
Sources
Footnotes: ^{1} People's Coalition results are compared to People's Alliance–People's Democratic Party totals in the 1982 election.; ^{2} United Left results are compared to Communist Party of Spain totals in the 1982 election.

=== 1982 ===
Summary of the 28 October 1982 Congress of Deputies election results in Cuenca
Parties and alliances	Popular vote			Seats	
Parties and alliances	Votes	%	±pp	Total	+/−
Spanish Socialist Workers' Party (PSOE)	59,676	44.94	+13.44	2	+1
People's Alliance–People's Democratic Party (AP–PDP)^{1}	42,274	31.84	+25.82	2	+2
Union of the Democratic Centre (UCD)	20,119	15.15	–37.22	0	–3
Communist Party of Spain (PCE)	4,257	3.21	–4.98	0	±0
New Force (FN)	2,868	2.16	New	0	±0
Democratic and Social Centre (CDS)	2,399	1.81	New	0	±0
Spanish Solidarity (SE)	325	0.24	New	0	±0
Communist Unification of Spain (UCE)	143	0.11	New	0	±0
Communist Movement (MC)	0	0.00	–0.16	0	±0
Blank ballots	717	0.54	+0.12		
Total	132,778			4	±0
Valid votes	132,778	98.23	–0.38		
Invalid votes	2,397	1.77	+0.38		
Votes cast / turnout	135,175	83.12	+9.02		
Abstentions	27,456	16.88	–9.02		
Registered voters	162,631				
Sources
Footnotes: ^{1} People's Alliance–People's Democratic Party results are compared to Democratic Coalition totals in the 1979 election.

=== 1979 ===
Summary of the 1 March 1979 Congress of Deputies election results in Cuenca
Parties and alliances	Popular vote			Seats	
Parties and alliances	Votes	%	±pp	Total	+/−
Union of the Democratic Centre (UCD)	64,273	52.37	–3.52	3	±0
Spanish Socialist Workers' Party (PSOE)^{1}	38,654	31.50	+7.50	1	±0
Communist Party of Spain (PCE)	10,049	8.19	+1.91	0	±0
Democratic Coalition (CD)^{2}	7,388	6.02	–2.12	0	±0
Authentic Spanish Phalanx (FEA)	698	0.57	New	0	±0
Workers' Revolutionary Organization (ORT)	319	0.26	New	0	±0
Party of Labour of Spain (PTE)^{3}	265	0.22	+0.03	0	±0
Communist Movement–Organization of Communist Left (MC–OIC)	196	0.16	New	0	±0
Communist Organization of Spain (Red Flag) (OCE–BR)	181	0.15	New	0	±0
Carlist Party (PC)	177	0.14	New	0	±0
Blank ballots	518	0.42	+0.17		
Total	122,718			4	±0
Valid votes	122,718	98.61	+0.23		
Invalid votes	1,732	1.39	–0.23		
Votes cast / turnout	124,450	74.10	–10.81		
Abstentions	43,496	25.90	+10.81		
Registered voters	167,946				
Sources
Footnotes: ^{1} Spanish Socialist Workers' Party results are compared to the combined totals of Spanish Socialist Workers' Party and People's Socialist Party–Socialist Unity in the 1977 election.; ^{2} Democratic Coalition results are compared to People's Alliance totals in the 1977 election.; ^{3} Party of Labour of Spain results are compared to Democratic Left Front totals in the 1977 election.

=== 1977 ===
Summary of the 15 June 1977 Congress of Deputies election results in Cuenca
Parties and alliances	Popular vote			Seats	
Parties and alliances	Votes	%	±pp	Total	+/−
Union of the Democratic Centre (UCD)	70,550	55.89	n/a	3	n/a
Spanish Socialist Workers' Party (PSOE)	28,350	22.46	n/a	1	n/a
People's Alliance (AP)	10,277	8.14	n/a	0	n/a
Communist Party of Spain (PCE)	7,927	6.28	n/a	0	n/a
Spanish Social Reform (RSE)	2,024	1.60	n/a	0	n/a
People's Socialist Party–Socialist Unity (PSP–US)	1,947	1.54	n/a	0	n/a
Federation of Christian Democracy (FPD–ID)	1,646	1.30	n/a	0	n/a
New Force (FN)	1,219	0.97	n/a	0	n/a
Democratic Socialist Alliance (ASDCI)	674	0.53	n/a	0	n/a
Spanish Phalanx of the CNSO (Authentic) (FE–JONS(A))	509	0.40	n/a	0	n/a
José Antonio Circles (CJA)	419	0.33	n/a	0	n/a
Democratic Left Front (FDI)	242	0.19	n/a	0	n/a
Independent Spanish Phalanx (FEI)	129	0.10	n/a	0	n/a
Blank ballots	314	0.25	n/a		
Total	126,227			4	n/a
Valid votes	126,227	98.38	n/a		
Invalid votes	2,077	1.62	n/a		
Votes cast / turnout	128,304	84.91	n/a		
Abstentions	22,795	15.09	n/a		
Registered voters	151,099				

== Bibliography ==
- Ley 1/1977, de 4 de enero, para la Reforma Política (Fundamental Law 1/1977). Official State Gazette (in Spanish). 4 January 1977. BOE-A-1977-165.
- Real Decreto-ley 20/1977, de 18 de marzo, sobre Normas Electorales (Royal Decree-Law 20/1977). Official State Gazette (in Spanish). 18 March 1977. BOE-A-1977-7445.
- Constitución Española (Constitution). Official State Gazette (in Spanish). 27 December 1978. BOE-A-1978-31229.
- Ley Orgánica 5/1985, de 19 de junio, del Régimen Electoral General (Organic Law 5/1985). Official State Gazette (in Spanish). 19 June 1985. BOE-A-1985-11672.
- Carreras de Odriozola, Albert; Tafunell Sambola, Xavier (2005) [1989]. Estadísticas históricas de España, siglos XIX-XX (PDF) (in Spanish). Vol. 1 (II ed.). Bilbao: Fundación BBVA. pp. 1072–1097. ISBN 84-96515-00-1. Archived from the original (PDF) on 24 September 2015.
