= Albacete (Congress of Deputies constituency) =

Electoral constituency in Spain

Coordinates: 38°50′N 2°00′W

- Congress of Deputies; Electoral constituency
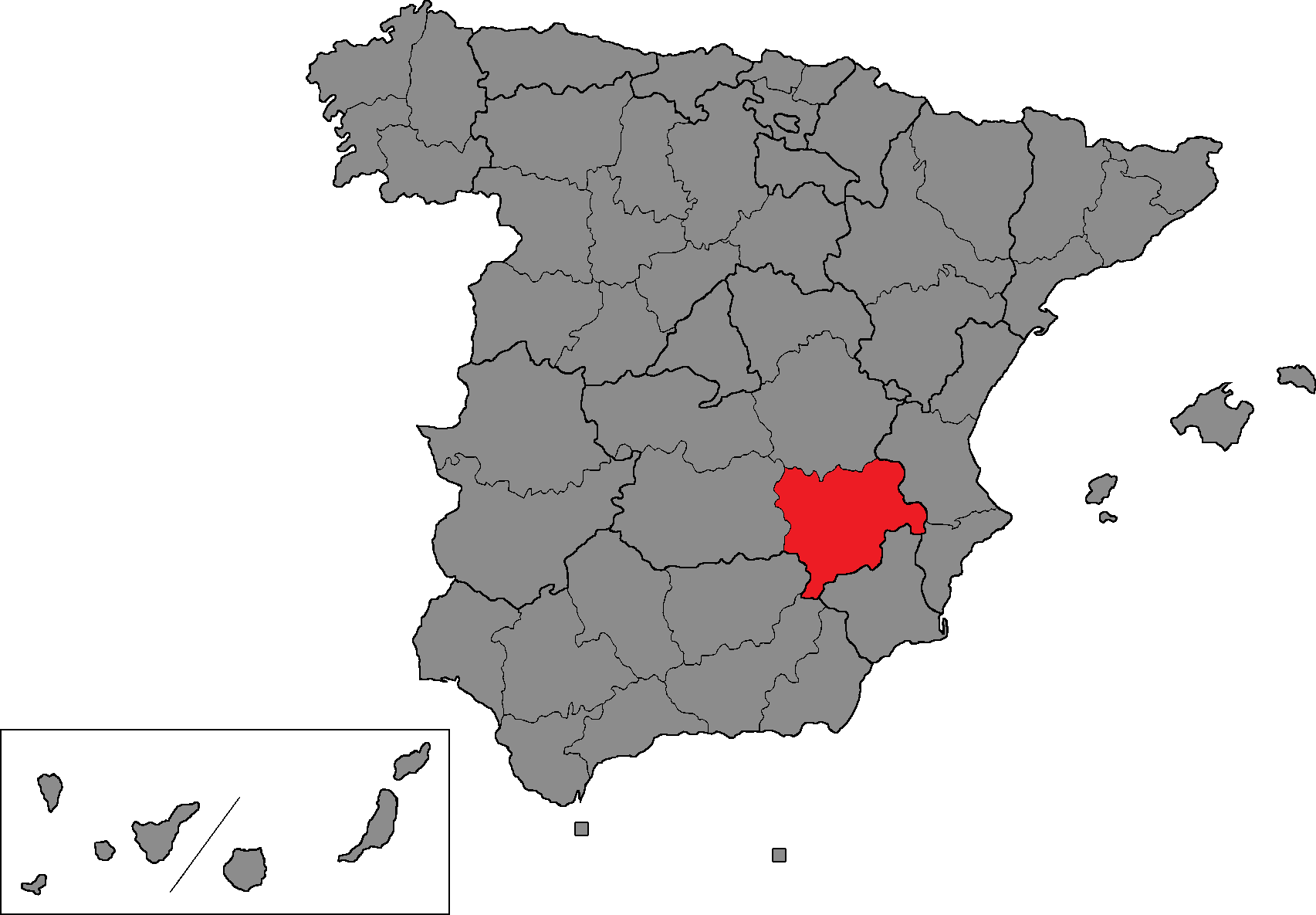
- Location of Albacete within Spain
- Province: Albacete
- Autonomous community: Castilla–La Mancha
- Population: ▲388,599 (2024)
- Electorate: ▼307,988 (2023)
- Major settlements: Albacete

Current constituency
- Created: 1977
- Seats: 4
- Members: PP (3); PSOE (1)

Albacete is one of the 52 constituencies represented in the Congress of Deputies, the lower chamber of the Spanish parliament, the Cortes Generales. The constituency (whose boundaries correspond to those of the homonymous province) currently elects four deputies. The electoral system uses the D'Hondt method and closed-list proportional voting, with a minimum threshold of three percent.

== Electoral system ==
The constituency was created as per the Political Reform Law and was first contested in the 1977 general election. The Law provided for the provinces of Spain to be established as multi-member districts in the Congress of Deputies, with this regulation being maintained under the Spanish Constitution of 1978. Additionally, the Constitution requires for any modification of the provincial limits to be approved under an organic law, needing an absolute majority in the Cortes Generales.

Voting is based on universal suffrage, comprising all Spanish nationals over 18 years of age with full political rights, provided that they have not been deprived of the right to vote by a final sentence. The only exception was in 1977, when this was limited to nationals over 21 years of age and in full enjoyment of their political and civil rights. Amendments in 2011 required non-resident citizens to apply for voting, a system known as "begged" voting (Spanish: Voto rogado). which was abolished in 2022. Further, amendments in 2018 granted the right to vote to those legally incapacitated. The Congress of Deputies has a minimum of 300 and a maximum of 400 seats, with electoral provisions fixing its size at 350. Of these, 348 are elected in 50 multi-member constituencies corresponding to the provinces of Spain—each of which is assigned an initial minimum of two seats and the remaining 248 distributed in proportion to population—using the D'Hondt method and closed-list proportional voting, with a three percent-threshold of valid votes (including blank ballots) in each constituency. The remaining two seats are allocated to Ceuta and Melilla as single-member districts elected by plurality voting. The use of this electoral method may result in a higher effective threshold depending on district magnitude and vote distribution. The law does not provide for by-elections to fill vacant seats; instead, any vacancies arising after the proclamation of candidates and during the legislative term are filled by the next candidates on the party lists or, when required, by designated substitutes.

The electoral law allows for parties and federations registered in the interior ministry, alliances and groupings of electors to present lists of candidates. Parties and federations intending to form an alliance are required to inform the relevant electoral commission within 10 days of the election call—15 before 1985—whereas groupings of electors need to secure the signature of at least one percent of the electorate in the constituencies for which they seek election—one permille of the electorate, with a compulsory minimum of 500 signatures, until 1985—disallowing electors from signing for more than one list. Also since 2011, parties, federations or alliances that have not obtained a mandate in either chamber of the Cortes at the preceding election are required to secure the signature of at least 0.1 percent of electors in the aforementioned constituencies. Amendments in 2007 required a balanced composition of men and women in the electoral lists, so that candidates of either sex made up at least 40 percent of the total composition; further amendments in 2024 required the use of a zipper system.

== Deputies ==
Deputies 1977–present
Key to parties U.Podemos PSOE Cs UCD PP CP AP Vox
Legislature	Election	Distribution
Constituent	1977	2 / 2
1st	1979	2 / 2
2nd	1982	3 / 1
3rd	1986	3 / 1
4th	1989	3 / 1
5th	1993	2 / 2
6th	1996	2 / 2
7th	2000	2 / 2
8th	2004	2 / 2
9th	2008	2 / 2
10th	2011	1 / 3
11th	2015	1 / 1 / 2
12th	2016	1 / 1 / 2
13th	2019 (Apr)	2 / 1 / 1
14th	2019 (Nov)	2 / 1 / 1
15th	2023	1 / 3

== General elections ==
=== 2026 ===
Summary of the 29 November 2026 Congress of Deputies election results in Albacete
Parties and alliances	Popular vote			Seats	
Parties and alliances	Votes	%	±pp	Total	+/−
People's Party (PP)					
Spanish Socialist Workers' Party (PSOE)					
Vox (Vox)					
Broad Front (FA)^{1}			n/a		
We Can (Podemos)^{1}			n/a		
Animalist Party with the Environment (PACMA)					
Workers' Front (FO)					
For a Fairer World (M+J)					
The Party is Over (SALF)			New		
Blank ballots					
Total				4	±0
Valid votes					
Invalid votes					
Votes cast / turnout					
Abstentions					
Registered voters	308,541				
Sources
Footnotes: ^{1} Within the Unite alliance in the 2023 election.

=== 2023 ===
Summary of the 23 July 2023 Congress of Deputies election results in Albacete
Parties and alliances	Popular vote			Seats	
Parties and alliances	Votes	%	±pp	Total	+/−
People's Party (PP)	88,299	39.92	+12.47	2	+1
Spanish Socialist Workers' Party (PSOE)	76,322	34.51	+1.92	2	±0
Vox (Vox)	36,750	16.61	–4.06	0	–1
Unite (Sumar)^{1}	15,834	7.16	–2.53	0	±0
Animalist Party with the Environment (PACMA)^{2}	1,261	0.57	–0.20	0	±0
Workers' Front (FO)	381	0.17	New	0	±0
For a Fairer World (PUM+J)	325	0.15	–0.02	0	±0
Zero Cuts (Recortes Cero)	185	0.08	–0.02	0	±0
Blank ballots	1,834	0.83	–0.02		
Total	221,191			4	±0
Valid votes	221,191	98.78	–0.02		
Invalid votes	2,726	1.22	+0.02		
Votes cast / turnout	223,917	72.70	+2.73		
Abstentions	84,071	27.30	–2.73		
Registered voters	307,988				
Sources
Footnotes: ^{1} Unite results are compared to United We Can totals in the November 2019 election.; ^{2} Animalist Party with the Environment results are compared to Animalist Party Against Mistreatment of Animals totals in the November 2019 election.

=== November 2019 ===
Summary of the 10 November 2019 Congress of Deputies election results in Albacete
Parties and alliances	Popular vote			Seats	
Parties and alliances	Votes	%	±pp	Total	+/−
Spanish Socialist Workers' Party (PSOE)	69,848	32.59	+0.59	2	±0
People's Party (PP)	58,835	27.45	+5.34	1	±0
Vox (Vox)	44,306	20.67	+6.19	1	+1
United We Can (Podemos–IU)	20,771	9.69	–0.91	0	±0
Citizens–Party of the Citizenry (Cs)	15,947	7.44	–11.26	0	–1
Animalist Party Against Mistreatment of Animals (PACMA)	1,651	0.77	–0.17	0	±0
For a Fairer World (PUM+J)	375	0.17	+0.04	0	±0
Zero Cuts–Green Group–PCAS–TC (Recortes Cero–GV–PCAS–TC)	222	0.10	–0.04	0	±0
European Retirees Social Democratic Party (PDSJE)	197	0.09	New	0	±0
Communist Party of the Peoples of Spain (PCPE)	177	0.08	–0.02	0	±0
Communist Party of the Workers of Spain (PCTE)	153	0.07	–0.01	0	±0
Blank ballots	1,822	0.85	+0.12		
Total	214,304			4	±0
Valid votes	214,304	98.80	+0.05		
Invalid votes	2,613	1.20	–0.05		
Votes cast / turnout	216,917	69.97	–6.55		
Abstentions	93,079	30.03	+6.55		
Registered voters	309,996				

=== April 2019 ===
Summary of the 28 April 2019 Congress of Deputies election results in Albacete
Parties and alliances	Popular vote			Seats	
Parties and alliances	Votes	%	±pp	Total	+/−
Spanish Socialist Workers' Party (PSOE)	75,005	32.00	+4.84	2	+1
People's Party (PP)	51,817	22.11	–18.77	1	–1
Citizens–Party of the Citizenry (Cs)	43,835	18.70	+4.13	1	+1
Vox (Vox)	33,948	14.48	New	0	±0
United We Can (Podemos–IU–Equo)	24,855	10.60	–4.67	0	–1
Animalist Party Against Mistreatment of Animals (PACMA)	2,205	0.94	+0.04	0	±0
Zero Cuts–Green Group–PCAS–TC (Recortes Cero–GV–PCAS–TC)	324	0.14	–0.01	0	±0
For a Fairer World (PUM+J)	304	0.13	New	0	±0
Communist Party of the Peoples of Spain (PCPE)	224	0.10	–0.01	0	±0
Communist Party of the Workers of Spain (PCTE)	182	0.08	New	0	±0
Blank ballots	1,705	0.73	+0.08		
Total	234,404			4	±0
Valid votes	234,404	98.75	–0.24		
Invalid votes	2,978	1.25	+0.24		
Votes cast / turnout	237,382	76.52	+5.02		
Abstentions	72,825	23.48	–5.02		
Registered voters	310,207				

=== 2016 ===
Summary of the 26 June 2016 Congress of Deputies election results in Albacete
Parties and alliances	Popular vote			Seats	
Parties and alliances	Votes	%	±pp	Total	+/−
People's Party (PP)	89,717	40.88	+4.07	2	±0
Spanish Socialist Workers' Party (PSOE)	59,617	27.16	–1.00	1	±0
United We Can (Podemos–IU–Equo)^{1}	33,509	15.27	–2.71	1	+1
Citizens–Party of the Citizenry (C's)	31,976	14.57	–0.01	0	–1
Animalist Party Against Mistreatment of Animals (PACMA)	1,985	0.90	+0.22	0	±0
Union, Progress and Democracy (UPyD)	430	0.20	–0.29	0	±0
Zero Cuts–Green Group (Recortes Cero–GV)	321	0.15	+0.02	0	±0
Spanish Phalanx of the CNSO (FE de las JONS)	255	0.12	New	0	±0
Communist Party of the Peoples of Spain (PCPE)	233	0.11	±0.00	0	±0
Blank ballots	1,430	0.65	–0.10		
Total	219,473			4	±0
Valid votes	219,473	98.99	–0.03		
Invalid votes	2,233	1.01	+0.03		
Votes cast / turnout	221,706	71.50	–3.78		
Abstentions	88,377	28.50	+3.78		
Registered voters	310,083				
Sources
Footnotes: ^{1} United We Can results are compared to the combined totals of We Can and United Left–Popular Unity in Common in the 2015 election.

=== 2015 ===
Summary of the 20 December 2015 Congress of Deputies election results in Albacete
Parties and alliances	Popular vote			Seats	
Parties and alliances	Votes	%	±pp	Total	+/−
People's Party (PP)	85,241	36.81	–18.28	2	–1
Spanish Socialist Workers' Party (PSOE)	65,205	28.16	–1.96	1	±0
Citizens–Party of the Citizenry (C's)	33,755	14.58	New	1	+1
We Can (Podemos)	32,320	13.96	New	0	±0
United Left–Popular Unity in Common (IU–UPeC)	9,306	4.02	–2.15	0	±0
Animalist Party Against Mistreatment of Animals (PACMA)	1,583	0.68	+0.28	0	±0
Union, Progress and Democracy (UPyD)	1,146	0.49	–4.51	0	±0
Vox (Vox)	538	0.23	New	0	±0
Zero Cuts–Green Group (Recortes Cero–GV)	305	0.13	New	0	±0
Communist Party of the Peoples of Spain (PCPE)	251	0.11	–0.06	0	±0
Liberal Party of the Right (PLD)	205	0.09	New	0	±0
Blank ballots	1,727	0.75	–0.58		
Total	231,582			4	±0
Valid votes	231,582	99.02	+0.38		
Invalid votes	2,300	0.98	–0.38		
Votes cast / turnout	233,882	75.28	–0.83		
Abstentions	76,792	24.72	+0.83		
Registered voters	310,674				

=== 2011 ===
Summary of the 20 November 2011 Congress of Deputies election results in Albacete
Parties and alliances	Popular vote			Seats	
Parties and alliances	Votes	%	±pp	Total	+/−
People's Party (PP)	127,995	55.09	+7.72	3	+1
Spanish Socialist Workers' Party (PSOE)	69,981	30.12	–15.62	1	–1
United Left of Castilla–La Mancha–The Greens: Plural Left (IUCLM–LV)	14,324	6.17	+2.79	0	±0
Union, Progress and Democracy (UPyD)	11,614	5.00	+3.72	0	±0
Equo (Equo)	2,077	0.89	New	0	±0
Blank Seats (EB)	1,153	0.50	New	0	±0
Animalist Party Against Mistreatment of Animals (PACMA)	921	0.40	+0.22	0	±0
For a Fairer World (PUM+J)	597	0.26	+0.10	0	±0
Communist Party of the Peoples of Spain (PCPE)	386	0.17	+0.11	0	±0
Centre and Democracy Forum (CyD)	192	0.08	New	0	±0
Blank ballots	3,082	1.33	+0.20		
Total	232,322			4	±0
Valid votes	232,322	98.64	–0.64		
Invalid votes	3,193	1.36	+0.64		
Votes cast / turnout	235,515	76.11	–3.55		
Abstentions	73,941	23.89	+3.55		
Registered voters	309,456				

=== 2008 ===
Summary of the 9 March 2008 Congress of Deputies election results in Albacete
Parties and alliances	Popular vote			Seats	
Parties and alliances	Votes	%	±pp	Total	+/−
People's Party (PP)	113,609	47.37	+0.42	2	±0
Spanish Socialist Workers' Party (PSOE)	109,682	45.74	–0.52	2	±0
United Left–Alternative (IU)	8,104	3.38	–0.51	0	±0
Union, Progress and Democracy (UPyD)	3,078	1.28	New	0	±0
Anti-Bullfighting Party Against Mistreatment of Animals (PACMA)	443	0.18	New	0	±0
Social Democratic Party (PSD)	377	0.16	New	0	±0
For a Fairer World (PUM+J)	372	0.16	New	0	±0
Citizens for Blank Votes (CenB)	327	0.14	–0.11	0	±0
Communist Party of the Peoples of Spain (PCPE)	153	0.06	–0.03	0	±0
Citizens–Party of the Citizenry (C's)	151	0.06	New	0	±0
Spanish Phalanx of the CNSO (FE de las JONS)	137	0.06	New	0	±0
Family and Life Party (PFyV)	130	0.05	–0.10	0	±0
Humanist Party (PH)	120	0.05	New	0	±0
Spain 2000 (E–2000)	117	0.05	New	0	±0
National Democracy (DN)	114	0.05	–0.04	0	±0
Commoners' Land (TC)	79	0.03	–0.04	0	±0
Authentic Phalanx (FA)	51	0.02	–0.02	0	±0
Spanish Alternative (AES)	48	0.02	New	0	±0
Blank ballots	2,717	1.13	–0.73		
Total	239,809			4	±0
Valid votes	239,809	99.28	+0.04		
Invalid votes	1,741	0.72	–0.04		
Votes cast / turnout	241,550	79.66	+0.39		
Abstentions	61,678	20.34	–0.39		
Registered voters	303,228				

=== 2004 ===
Summary of the 14 March 2004 Congress of Deputies election results in Albacete
Parties and alliances	Popular vote			Seats	
Parties and alliances	Votes	%	±pp	Total	+/−
People's Party (PP)	110,338	46.95	–4.24	2	±0
Spanish Socialist Workers' Party (PSOE)	108,715	46.26	+5.06	2	±0
United Left–Left of Castilla–La Mancha (IU–ICAM)	9,145	3.89	–1.10	0	±0
Citizens for Blank Votes (CenB)	580	0.25	New	0	±0
Democratic and Social Centre (CDS)	371	0.16	+0.05	0	±0
Family and Life Party (PFyV)	353	0.15	New	0	±0
National Democracy (DN)	223	0.09	New	0	±0
Communist Party of the Peoples of Spain (PCPE)	212	0.09	New	0	±0
The Phalanx (FE)	160	0.07	–0.02	0	±0
Commoners' Land–Castilian Nationalist Party (TC–PNC)	155	0.07	–0.04	0	±0
Republican Left (IR)	139	0.06	New	0	±0
Spanish Democratic Party (PADE)	116	0.05	±0.00	0	±0
Authentic Phalanx (FA)	95	0.04	New	0	±0
Republican Social Movement (MSR)	49	0.02	New	0	±0
Blank ballots	4,372	1.86	+0.29		
Total	235,023			4	±0
Valid votes	235,023	99.24	–0.08		
Invalid votes	1,810	0.76	+0.08		
Votes cast / turnout	236,833	79.27	+3.69		
Abstentions	61,947	20.73	–3.69		
Registered voters	298,780				

=== 2000 ===
Summary of the 12 March 2000 Congress of Deputies election results in Albacete
Parties and alliances	Popular vote			Seats	
Parties and alliances	Votes	%	±pp	Total	+/−
People's Party (PP)	113,406	51.19	+6.53	2	±0
Spanish Socialist Workers' Party–Progressives (PSOE–p)	91,270	41.20	–2.69	2	±0
United Left (IU)	11,062	4.99	–4.63	0	±0
Liberal Independent Group (GIL)	535	0.24	New	0	±0
Natural Law Party (PLN)	474	0.21	New	0	±0
Humanist Party (PH)	307	0.14	+0.01	0	±0
Commoners' Land–Castilian Nationalist Party (TC–PNC)	250	0.11	+0.04	0	±0
Centrist Union–Democratic and Social Centre (UC–CDS)	248	0.11	–0.15	0	±0
The Phalanx (FE)	207	0.09	New	0	±0
Spain 2000 Platform (ES2000)	175	0.08	New	0	±0
Spanish Democratic Party (PADE)	121	0.05	New	0	±0
Blank ballots	3,484	1.57	+0.60		
Total	221,539			4	±0
Valid votes	221,539	99.32	–0.18		
Invalid votes	1,514	0.68	+0.18		
Votes cast / turnout	223,053	75.58	–7.90		
Abstentions	72,052	24.42	+7.90		
Registered voters	295,105				

=== 1996 ===
Summary of the 3 March 1996 Congress of Deputies election results in Albacete
Parties and alliances	Popular vote			Seats	
Parties and alliances	Votes	%	±pp	Total	+/−
People's Party (PP)	105,294	44.66	+4.16	2	±0
Spanish Socialist Workers' Party (PSOE)	103,471	43.89	–2.25	2	±0
United Left–Left of Castilla–La Mancha (IU–ICAM)	22,682	9.62	+0.29	0	±0
Centrist Union (UC)	617	0.26	–1.64	0	±0
Regionalist Party of Castilla–La Mancha (PRCM)	495	0.21	New	0	±0
Humanist Party (PH)	301	0.13	+0.07	0	±0
Workers' Revolutionary Party (PRT)	242	0.10	New	0	±0
Authentic Spanish Phalanx (FEA)	227	0.10	New	0	±0
Commoners' Land–Castilian Nationalist Party (TC–PNC)	156	0.07	+0.01	0	±0
Blank ballots	2,289	0.97	+0.14		
Total	235,774			4	±0
Valid votes	235,774	99.50	+0.04		
Invalid votes	1,191	0.50	–0.04		
Votes cast / turnout	236,965	83.48	+1.09		
Abstentions	46,886	16.52	–1.09		
Registered voters	283,851				

=== 1993 ===
Summary of the 6 June 1993 Congress of Deputies election results in Albacete
Parties and alliances	Popular vote			Seats	
Parties and alliances	Votes	%	±pp	Total	+/−
Spanish Socialist Workers' Party (PSOE)	103,057	46.14	–3.51	2	–1
People's Party (PP)	90,453	40.50	+9.73	2	+1
United Left (IU)	20,841	9.33	+0.92	0	±0
Democratic and Social Centre (CDS)	4,253	1.90	–5.53	0	±0
The Greens (Verdes)^{1}	1,310	0.59	–0.09	0	±0
The Ecologists (LE)	619	0.28	–0.17	0	±0
Ruiz-Mateos Group–European Democratic Alliance (ARM–ADE)	456	0.20	–0.43	0	±0
Humanist Party (PH)	132	0.06	–0.04	0	±0
Commoners' Land–Castilian Nationalist Party (TC–PNC)	130	0.06	New	0	±0
Natural Law Party (PLN)	125	0.06	New	0	±0
Coalition for a New Socialist Party (CNPS)	116	0.05	New	0	±0
Communist Unification of Spain (UCE)	0	0.00	New	0	±0
Blank ballots	1,843	0.83	+0.16		
Total	223,335			4	±0
Valid votes	223,335	99.46	+0.08		
Invalid votes	1,214	0.54	–0.08		
Votes cast / turnout	224,549	82.39	+5.74		
Abstentions	47,987	17.61	–5.74		
Registered voters	272,536				
Sources
Footnotes: ^{1} The Greens results are compared to The Greens–Green List totals in the 1989 election.

=== 1989 ===
Summary of the 29 October 1989 Congress of Deputies election results in Albacete
Parties and alliances	Popular vote			Seats	
Parties and alliances	Votes	%	±pp	Total	+/−
Spanish Socialist Workers' Party (PSOE)	97,904	49.65	–1.40	3	±0
People's Party (PP)^{1}	60,664	30.77	–1.11	1	±0
United Left (IU)	16,580	8.41	+3.86	0	±0
Democratic and Social Centre (CDS)	14,651	7.43	–1.31	0	±0
The Greens–Green List (LV–LV)	1,336	0.68	New	0	±0
Ruiz-Mateos Group (Ruiz-Mateos)	1,242	0.63	New	0	±0
The Ecologist Greens (LVE)	891	0.45	New	0	±0
Workers' Party of Spain–Communist Unity (PTE–UC)^{2}	830	0.42	–0.64	0	±0
Workers' Socialist Party (PST)	729	0.37	+0.08	0	±0
Communist Party of the Peoples of Spain (PCPE)	557	0.28	New	0	±0
Spanish Phalanx of the CNSO (FE–JONS)	270	0.14	–0.24	0	±0
Humanist Party (PH)	197	0.10	New	0	±0
Communist Party of Spain (Marxist–Leninist) (PCE (m–l))^{3}	0	0.00	–0.14	0	±0
Blank ballots	1,322	0.67	±0.00		
Total	197,173			4	±0
Valid votes	197,173	99.38	+0.48		
Invalid votes	1,236	0.62	–0.48		
Votes cast / turnout	198,409	76.65	+3.60		
Abstentions	60,446	23.35	–3.60		
Registered voters	258,855				
Sources
Footnotes: ^{1} People's Party results are compared to People's Coalition totals in the 1986 election.; ^{2} Workers' Party of Spain–Communist Unity results are compared to Communists' Unity Board totals in the 1986 election.; ^{3} Communist Party of Spain (Marxist–Leninist) results are compared to Republican Popular Unity totals in the 1986 election.

=== 1986 ===
Summary of the 22 June 1986 Congress of Deputies election results in Albacete
Parties and alliances	Popular vote			Seats	
Parties and alliances	Votes	%	±pp	Total	+/−
Spanish Socialist Workers' Party (PSOE)	97,838	51.05	–2.52	3	±0
People's Coalition (AP–PDP–PL)^{1}	61,093	31.88	+3.02	1	±0
Democratic and Social Centre (CDS)	16,750	8.74	+6.75	0	±0
United Left (IU)^{2}	8,729	4.55	–0.05	0	±0
Communists' Unity Board (MUC)	2,031	1.06	New	0	±0
Democratic Reformist Party (PRD)	1,871	0.98	New	0	±0
Spanish Phalanx of the CNSO (FE–JONS)	723	0.38	+0.26	0	±0
Workers' Socialist Party (PST)	553	0.29	–0.15	0	±0
Communist Unification of Spain (UCE)	343	0.18	+0.11	0	±0
Republican Popular Unity (UPR)^{3}	261	0.14	+0.06	0	±0
Internationalist Socialist Workers' Party (POSI)	160	0.08	New	0	±0
Party of the Communists of Catalonia (PCC)	0	0.00	New	0	±0
Blank ballots	1,289	0.67	+0.22		
Total	191,641			4	±0
Valid votes	191,641	98.90	+0.99		
Invalid votes	2,126	1.10	–0.99		
Votes cast / turnout	193,767	73.05	–8.98		
Abstentions	71,500	26.95	+8.98		
Registered voters	265,267				
Sources
Footnotes: ^{1} People's Coalition results are compared to People's Alliance–People's Democratic Party totals in the 1982 election.; ^{2} United Left results are compared to Communist Party of Spain totals in the 1982 election.; ^{3} Republican Popular Unity results are compared to Communist Party of Spain (Marxist–Leninist) totals in the 1982 election.

=== 1982 ===
Summary of the 28 October 1982 Congress of Deputies election results in Albacete
Parties and alliances	Popular vote			Seats	
Parties and alliances	Votes	%	±pp	Total	+/−
Spanish Socialist Workers' Party (PSOE)	103,328	53.57	+14.86	3	+1
People's Alliance–People's Democratic Party (AP–PDP)^{1}	55,666	28.86	+24.00	1	+1
Union of the Democratic Centre (UCD)	16,755	8.69	–30.27	0	–2
Communist Party of Spain (PCE)	8,874	4.60	–7.79	0	±0
Democratic and Social Centre (CDS)	3,846	1.99	New	0	±0
New Force (FN)^{2}	1,388	0.72	–1.50	0	±0
Workers' Socialist Party (PST)	855	0.44	New	0	±0
Spanish Solidarity (SE)	457	0.24	New	0	±0
Spanish Phalanx of the CNSO (FE–JONS)	240	0.12	New	0	±0
Communist Unity Candidacy (CUC)^{3}	193	0.10	–0.10	0	±0
Communist Party of Spain (Marxist–Leninist) (PCE (m–l))	149	0.08	New	0	±0
Falangist Movement of Spain (MFE)	141	0.07	New	0	±0
Communist Unification of Spain (UCE)	129	0.07	–0.10	0	±0
Communist Movement (MC)	0	0.00	New	0	±0
Communist League–Internationalist Socialist Workers' Coalition (LC (COSI))	0	0.00	New	0	±0
Socialist Party (PS)^{4}	0	0.00	–1.30	0	±0
Blank ballots	861	0.45	+0.24		
Total	192,882			4	±0
Valid votes	192,882	97.91	–1.17		
Invalid votes	4,110	2.09	+1.17		
Votes cast / turnout	196,992	82.03	+10.52		
Abstentions	43,163	17.97	–10.52		
Registered voters	240,155				
Sources
Footnotes: ^{1} People's Alliance–People's Democratic Party results are compared to Democratic Coalition totals in the 1979 election.; ^{2} New Force results are compared to National Union totals in the 1979 election.; ^{3} Communist Unity Candidacy results are compared to Workers' Communist Party totals in the 1979 election.; ^{4} Socialist Party results are compared to Spanish Socialist Workers' Party (historical) totals in the 1979 election.

=== 1979 ===
Summary of the 1 March 1979 Congress of Deputies election results in Albacete
Parties and alliances	Popular vote			Seats	
Parties and alliances	Votes	%	±pp	Total	+/−
Union of the Democratic Centre (UCD)	65,883	38.96	+0.86	2	±0
Spanish Socialist Workers' Party (PSOE)^{1}	65,465	38.71	–1.52	2	±0
Communist Party of Spain (PCE)	20,945	12.39	+4.36	0	±0
Democratic Coalition (CD)^{2}	8,224	4.86	–4.58	0	±0
National Union (UN)^{3}	3,753	2.22	–0.69	0	±0
Spanish Socialist Workers' Party (historical) (PSOEh)	2,205	1.30	New	0	±0
Party of Labour of Spain (PTE)^{4}	455	0.27	–0.73	0	±0
Workers' Communist Party (PCT)	338	0.20	New	0	±0
Republican Left (IR)	311	0.18	New	0	±0
Communist Unification of Spain (UCE)	286	0.17	New	0	±0
Workers' Revolutionary Organization (ORT)	284	0.17	New	0	±0
Carlist Party (PC)	241	0.14	New	0	±0
Communist Organization of Spain (Red Flag) (OCE–BR)	195	0.12	New	0	±0
Revolutionary Communist League (LCR)	165	0.10	New	0	±0
Blank ballots	359	0.21	–0.07		
Total	169,109			4	±0
Valid votes	169,109	99.08	+0.32		
Invalid votes	1,569	0.92	–0.32		
Votes cast / turnout	170,678	71.51	–9.76		
Abstentions	68,004	28.49	+9.76		
Registered voters	238,682				
Sources
Footnotes: ^{1} Spanish Socialist Workers' Party results are compared to the combined totals of Spanish Socialist Workers' Party and Centre-Left of Albacete in the 1977 election.; ^{2} Democratic Coalition results are compared to People's Alliance totals in the 1977 election.; ^{3} National Union results are compared to Spanish Phalanx of the CNSO totals in the 1977 election.; ^{4} Party of Labour of Spain results are compared to Democratic Left Front totals in the 1977 election.

=== 1977 ===
Summary of the 15 June 1977 Congress of Deputies election results in Albacete
Parties and alliances	Popular vote			Seats	
Parties and alliances	Votes	%	±pp	Total	+/−
Union of the Democratic Centre (UCD)	64,603	38.10	n/a	2	n/a
Spanish Socialist Workers' Party (PSOE)	56,332	33.22	n/a	2	n/a
People's Alliance (AP)	16,005	9.44	n/a	0	n/a
Communist Party of Spain (PCE)	13,623	8.03	n/a	0	n/a
Centre-Left of Albacete (CIA)	11,879	7.01	n/a	0	n/a
Spanish Phalanx of the CNSO (FE–JONS)	4,939	2.91	n/a	0	n/a
Democratic Left Front (FDI)	1,698	1.00	n/a	0	n/a
Blank ballots	474	0.28	n/a		
Total	169,553			4	n/a
Valid votes	169,553	98.76	n/a		
Invalid votes	2,137	1.24	n/a		
Votes cast / turnout	171,690	81.27	n/a		
Abstentions	39,559	18.73	n/a		
Registered voters	211,249				

== Bibliography ==
- Ley 1/1977, de 4 de enero, para la Reforma Política (Fundamental Law 1/1977). Official State Gazette (in Spanish). 4 January 1977. BOE-A-1977-165.
- Real Decreto-ley 20/1977, de 18 de marzo, sobre Normas Electorales (Royal Decree-Law 20/1977). Official State Gazette (in Spanish). 18 March 1977. BOE-A-1977-7445.
- Constitución Española (Constitution). Official State Gazette (in Spanish). 27 December 1978. BOE-A-1978-31229.
- Ley Orgánica 5/1985, de 19 de junio, del Régimen Electoral General (Organic Law 5/1985). Official State Gazette (in Spanish). 19 June 1985. BOE-A-1985-11672.
- Carreras de Odriozola, Albert; Tafunell Sambola, Xavier (2005) [1989]. Estadísticas históricas de España, siglos XIX-XX (PDF) (in Spanish). Vol. 1 (II ed.). Bilbao: Fundación BBVA. pp. 1072–1097. ISBN 84-96515-00-1. Archived from the original (PDF) on 24 September 2015.
