= Salamanca (Congress of Deputies constituency) =

Electoral constituency in Spain

Coordinates: 40°50′N 6°00′W

- Congress of Deputies; Electoral constituency
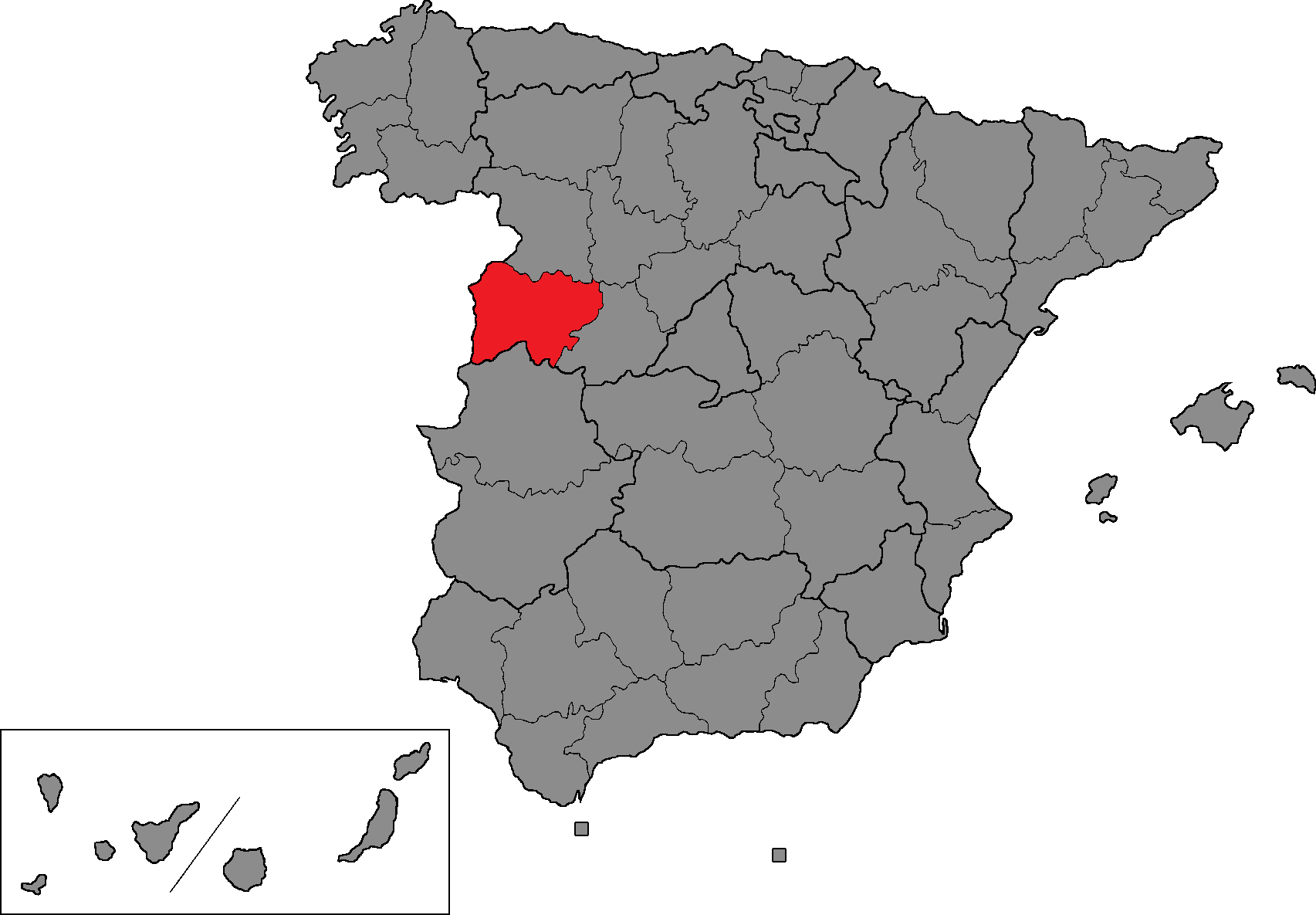
- Location of Salamanca within Spain
- Province: Salamanca
- Autonomous community: Castile and León
- Population: ▲327,685 (2024)
- Electorate: ▼300,506 (2023)
- Major settlements: Salamanca

Current constituency
- Created: 1977
- Seats: 4
- Members: PP (3); PSOE (1)

Salamanca is one of the 52 constituencies represented in the Congress of Deputies, the lower chamber of the Spanish parliament, the Cortes Generales. The constituency (whose boundaries correspond to those of the homonymous province) currently elects four deputies. The electoral system uses the D'Hondt method and closed-list proportional voting, with a minimum threshold of three percent.

== Electoral system ==
The constituency was created as per the Political Reform Law and was first contested in the 1977 general election. The Law provided for the provinces of Spain to be established as multi-member districts in the Congress of Deputies, with this regulation being maintained under the Spanish Constitution of 1978. Additionally, the Constitution requires for any modification of the provincial limits to be approved under an organic law, needing an absolute majority in the Cortes Generales.

Voting is based on universal suffrage, comprising all Spanish nationals over 18 years of age with full political rights, provided that they have not been deprived of the right to vote by a final sentence. The only exception was in 1977, when this was limited to nationals over 21 years of age and in full enjoyment of their political and civil rights. Amendments in 2011 required non-resident citizens to apply for voting, a system known as "begged" voting (Spanish: Voto rogado). which was abolished in 2022. Further, amendments in 2018 granted the right to vote to those legally incapacitated. The Congress of Deputies has a minimum of 300 and a maximum of 400 seats, with electoral provisions fixing its size at 350. Of these, 348 are elected in 50 multi-member constituencies corresponding to the provinces of Spain—each of which is assigned an initial minimum of two seats and the remaining 248 distributed in proportion to population—using the D'Hondt method and closed-list proportional voting, with a three percent-threshold of valid votes (including blank ballots) in each constituency. The remaining two seats are allocated to Ceuta and Melilla as single-member districts elected by plurality voting. The use of this electoral method may result in a higher effective threshold depending on district magnitude and vote distribution. The law does not provide for by-elections to fill vacant seats; instead, any vacancies arising after the proclamation of candidates and during the legislative term are filled by the next candidates on the party lists or, when required, by designated substitutes.

The electoral law allows for parties and federations registered in the interior ministry, alliances and groupings of electors to present lists of candidates. Parties and federations intending to form an alliance are required to inform the relevant electoral commission within 10 days of the election call—15 before 1985—whereas groupings of electors need to secure the signature of at least one percent of the electorate in the constituencies for which they seek election—one permille of the electorate, with a compulsory minimum of 500 signatures, until 1985—disallowing electors from signing for more than one list. Also since 2011, parties, federations or alliances that have not obtained a mandate in either chamber of the Cortes at the preceding election are required to secure the signature of at least 0.1 percent of electors in the aforementioned constituencies. Amendments in 2007 required a balanced composition of men and women in the electoral lists, so that candidates of either sex made up at least 40 percent of the total composition; further amendments in 2024 required the use of a zipper system.

== Deputies ==
Deputies 1977–present
Key to parties PSOE CDS Cs UCD PP CP AP Vox
Legislature	Election	Distribution
Constituent	1977	1 / 3
1st	1979	1 / 3
2nd	1982	3 / 1
3rd	1986	2 / 1 / 1
4th	1989	2 / 2
5th	1993	2 / 2
6th	1996	1 / 3
7th	2000	1 / 3
8th	2004	2 / 2
9th	2008	2 / 2
10th	2011	1 / 3
11th	2015	1 / 1 / 2
12th	2016	1 / 3
13th	2019 (Apr)	1 / 1 / 2
14th	2019 (Nov)	1 / 2 / 1
15th	2023	1 / 3

== General elections ==
=== 2026 ===
Summary of the 29 November 2026 Congress of Deputies election results in Salamanca
Parties and alliances	Popular vote			Seats	
Parties and alliances	Votes	%	±pp	Total	+/−
People's Party (PP)					
Spanish Socialist Workers' Party (PSOE)					
Vox (Vox)					
Broad Front (FA)^{1}			n/a		
We Can (Podemos)^{1}			n/a		
Regionalist Party of the Leonese Country (PREPAL)					
Communist Party of the Workers of Spain (PCTE)					
Workers' Front (FO)					
The Party is Over (SALF)			New		
Blank ballots					
Total				4	±0
Valid votes					
Invalid votes					
Votes cast / turnout					
Abstentions					
Registered voters	304,762				
Sources
Footnotes: ^{1} Within the Unite alliance in the 2023 election.

=== 2023 ===
Summary of the 23 July 2023 Congress of Deputies election results in Salamanca
Parties and alliances	Popular vote			Seats	
Parties and alliances	Votes	%	±pp	Total	+/−
People's Party (PP)	93,318	46.87	+12.17	3	+1
Spanish Socialist Workers' Party (PSOE)	60,718	30.49	+1.04	1	±0
Vox (Vox)	29,203	14.67	–3.23	0	–1
Unite (Sumar)^{1}	11,012	5.53	–1.44	0	±0
Empty Spain (España Vaciada)	1,062	0.53	New	0	±0
Animalist Party with the Environment (PACMA)^{2}	631	0.32	–0.17	0	±0
Regionalist Party of the Leonese Country (PREPAL)	489	0.25	+0.09	0	±0
Communist Party of the Workers of Spain (PCTE)	325	0.16	+0.06	0	±0
Workers' Front (FO)	278	0.14	New	0	±0
For a Fairer World (PUM+J)	205	0.10	–0.04	0	±0
Walking Together (CJ)	140	0.07	New	0	±0
Zero Cuts (Recortes Cero)	80	0.04	–0.12	0	±0
Blank ballots	1,649	0.83	–0.19		
Total	199,110			4	±0
Valid votes	199,110	98.85	+0.12		
Invalid votes	2,309	1.15	–0.12		
Votes cast / turnout	201,419	67.03	+2.33		
Abstentions	99,087	32.97	–2.33		
Registered voters	300,506				
Sources
Footnotes: ^{1} Unite results are compared to United We Can totals in the November 2019 election.; ^{2} Animalist Party with the Environment results are compared to Animalist Party Against Mistreatment of Animals totals in the November 2019 election.

=== November 2019 ===
Summary of the 10 November 2019 Congress of Deputies election results in Salamanca
Parties and alliances	Popular vote			Seats	
Parties and alliances	Votes	%	±pp	Total	+/−
People's Party (PP)	67,715	34.70	+6.14	2	±0
Spanish Socialist Workers' Party (PSOE)	57,481	29.45	+1.28	1	±0
Vox (Vox)	34,929	17.90	+5.26	1	+1
Citizens–Party of the Citizenry (Cs)	16,886	8.65	–12.04	0	–1
United We Can (Podemos–IU)	13,608	6.97	–0.90	0	±0
Animalist Party Against Mistreatment of Animals (PACMA)	964	0.49	–0.16	0	±0
Regionalist Party of the Leonese Country (PREPAL)	322	0.16	+0.01	0	±0
Zero Cuts–Green Group–PCAS–TC (Recortes Cero–GV–PCAS–TC)	306	0.16	+0.03	0	±0
Leonese People's Union (UPL)	286	0.15	New	0	±0
For a Fairer World (PUM+J)	266	0.14	–0.01	0	±0
With You, We Are Democracy (Contigo)	229	0.12	New	0	±0
Communist Party of the Workers of Spain (PCTE)	196	0.10	–0.03	0	±0
Blank ballots	1,982	1.02	+0.15		
Total	195,170			4	±0
Valid votes	195,170	98.73	–0.07		
Invalid votes	2,503	1.27	+0.07		
Votes cast / turnout	197,673	64.70	–4.96		
Abstentions	107,863	35.30	+4.96		
Registered voters	305,536				

=== April 2019 ===
Summary of the 28 April 2019 Congress of Deputies election results in Salamanca
Parties and alliances	Popular vote			Seats	
Parties and alliances	Votes	%	±pp	Total	+/−
People's Party (PP)	60,154	28.56	–19.68	2	–1
Spanish Socialist Workers' Party (PSOE)	59,331	28.17	+6.81	1	±0
Citizens–Party of the Citizenry (Cs)	43,580	20.69	+4.95	1	+1
Vox (Vox)	26,631	12.64	New	0	±0
United We Can (Podemos–IU–Equo)	16,575	7.87	–4.69	0	±0
Animalist Party Against Mistreatment of Animals (PACMA)	1,370	0.65	–0.02	0	±0
For a Fairer World (PUM+J)	322	0.15	New	0	±0
Regionalist Party of the Leonese Country (PREPAL)	309	0.15	+0.03	0	±0
Zero Cuts–Green Group–PCAS–TC (Recortes Cero–GV–PCAS–TC)	275	0.13	–0.03	0	±0
Communist Party of the Workers of Spain (PCTE)	265	0.13	New	0	±0
Blank ballots	1,834	0.87	+0.16		
Total	210,646			4	±0
Valid votes	210,646	98.80	–0.16		
Invalid votes	2,567	1.20	+0.16		
Votes cast / turnout	213,213	69.66	+3.36		
Abstentions	92,862	30.34	–3.36		
Registered voters	306,075				

=== 2016 ===
Summary of the 26 June 2016 Congress of Deputies election results in Salamanca
Parties and alliances	Popular vote			Seats	
Parties and alliances	Votes	%	±pp	Total	+/−
People's Party (PP)	97,672	48.24	+5.57	3	+1
Spanish Socialist Workers' Party (PSOE)	43,252	21.36	–0.41	1	±0
Citizens–Party of the Citizenry (C's)	31,878	15.74	–1.08	0	–1
United We Can (Podemos–IU–Equo)^{1}	25,441	12.56	–3.08	0	±0
Animalist Party Against Mistreatment of Animals (PACMA)	1,359	0.67	+0.11	0	±0
Union, Progress and Democracy (UPyD)	683	0.34	–0.46	0	±0
Zero Cuts–Green Group (Recortes Cero–GV)	326	0.16	+0.01	0	±0
Regionalist Party of the Leonese Country (PREPAL)	233	0.12	±0.00	0	±0
Communist Party of the Peoples of Spain (PCPE)	196	0.10	–0.03	0	±0
Blank ballots	1,443	0.71	–0.24		
Total	202,483			4	±0
Valid votes	202,483	98.96	+0.03		
Invalid votes	2,132	1.04	–0.03		
Votes cast / turnout	204,615	66.30	–2.15		
Abstentions	103,997	33.70	+2.15		
Registered voters	308,612				
Sources
Footnotes: ^{1} United We Can results are compared to the combined totals of We Can and United Left–Popular Unity in Common in the 2015 election.

=== 2015 ===
Summary of the 20 December 2015 Congress of Deputies election results in Salamanca
Parties and alliances	Popular vote			Seats	
Parties and alliances	Votes	%	±pp	Total	+/−
People's Party (PP)	89,375	42.67	–17.37	2	–1
Spanish Socialist Workers' Party (PSOE)	45,593	21.77	–4.47	1	±0
Citizens–Party of the Citizenry (C's)	35,242	16.82	New	1	+1
We Can (Podemos)	25,743	12.29	New	0	±0
United Left–Popular Unity in Common (IU–UPeC)	7,017	3.35	–0.96	0	±0
Union, Progress and Democracy (UPyD)	1,669	0.80	–5.38	0	±0
Animalist Party Against Mistreatment of Animals (PACMA)	1,175	0.56	+0.29	0	±0
Vox (Vox)	822	0.39	New	0	±0
Zero Cuts–Green Group (Recortes Cero–GV)	319	0.15	New	0	±0
Communist Party of the Peoples of Spain (PCPE)	264	0.13	New	0	±0
Regionalist Party of the Leonese Country (PREPAL)	251	0.12	–0.07	0	±0
Blank ballots	1,997	0.95	–0.55		
Total	209,467			4	±0
Valid votes	209,467	98.93	+0.27		
Invalid votes	2,276	1.07	–0.27		
Votes cast / turnout	211,743	68.45	–1.28		
Abstentions	97,615	31.55	+1.28		
Registered voters	309,358				

=== 2011 ===
Summary of the 20 November 2011 Congress of Deputies election results in Salamanca
Parties and alliances	Popular vote			Seats	
Parties and alliances	Votes	%	±pp	Total	+/−
People's Party (PP)	128,887	60.04	+6.26	3	+1
Spanish Socialist Workers' Party (PSOE)	56,331	26.24	–13.72	1	–1
Union, Progress and Democracy (UPyD)	13,276	6.18	+4.45	0	±0
United Left of Castile and León: Plural Left (IUCyL)	9,256	4.31	+2.58	0	±0
Equo (Equo)	1,648	0.77	New	0	±0
Blank Seats (EB)	686	0.32	New	0	±0
Animalist Party Against Mistreatment of Animals (PACMA)	584	0.27	+0.14	0	±0
Regionalist Party of the Leonese Country (PREPAL)	408	0.19	+0.05	0	±0
Democratic Hygiene (HD)	206	0.10	New	0	±0
Communist Unification of Spain (UCE)	161	0.08	New	0	±0
Blank ballots	3,223	1.50	+0.27		
Total	214,666			4	±0
Valid votes	214,666	98.66	–0.64		
Invalid votes	2,905	1.34	+0.64		
Votes cast / turnout	217,571	69.73	–6.80		
Abstentions	94,430	30.27	+6.80		
Registered voters	312,001				

=== 2008 ===
Summary of the 9 March 2008 Congress of Deputies election results in Salamanca
Parties and alliances	Popular vote			Seats	
Parties and alliances	Votes	%	±pp	Total	+/−
People's Party (PP)	127,130	53.78	–0.47	2	±0
Spanish Socialist Workers' Party (PSOE)	94,474	39.96	+0.13	2	±0
United Left–Alternative (IU)	4,085	1.73	–0.25	0	±0
Union, Progress and Democracy (UPyD)	4,083	1.73	New	0	±0
The Greens of Europe (LVdE)	663	0.28	New	0	±0
Citizens–Party of the Citizenry (C's)	430	0.18	New	0	±0
Regionalist Party of the Leonese Country (PREPAL)	322	0.14	–0.08	0	±0
Anti-Bullfighting Party Against Mistreatment of Animals (PACMA)	312	0.13	New	0	±0
Social Democratic Party (PSD)	299	0.13	New	0	±0
Carlist Party (PC)	270	0.11	New	0	±0
For a Fairer World (PUM+J)	241	0.10	New	0	±0
National Democracy (DN)	232	0.10	+0.06	0	±0
Citizens for Blank Votes (CenB)	206	0.09	–0.11	0	±0
Communist Party of the Castilian People (PCPC–PCPE)	160	0.07	+0.02	0	±0
Engine and Sports Alternative (AMD)	127	0.05	New	0	±0
Humanist Party (PH)	115	0.05	–0.05	0	±0
Spanish Phalanx of the CNSO (FE de las JONS)	98	0.04	±0.00	0	±0
Authentic Phalanx (FA)	64	0.03	+0.01	0	±0
Spanish Alternative (AES)	54	0.02	New	0	±0
State of Spain Unionist Party (PUEDE)	43	0.02	New	0	±0
Spain 2000 (E–2000)	43	0.02	New	0	±0
National Alliance (AN)	29	0.01	New	0	±0
Blank ballots	2,914	1.23	–0.74		
Total	236,394			4	±0
Valid votes	236,394	99.30	+0.02		
Invalid votes	1,674	0.70	–0.02		
Votes cast / turnout	238,068	76.53	–0.09		
Abstentions	73,027	23.47	+0.09		
Registered voters	311,095				

=== 2004 ===
Summary of the 14 March 2004 Congress of Deputies election results in Salamanca
Parties and alliances	Popular vote			Seats	
Parties and alliances	Votes	%	±pp	Total	+/−
People's Party (PP)	128,932	54.25	–4.27	2	–1
Spanish Socialist Workers' Party (PSOE)	94,655	39.83	+7.16	2	+1
United Left (IU)	4,713	1.98	–1.70	0	±0
Union of the Salamancan People (UPSa)	1,871	0.79	New	0	±0
Salamanca–Zamora–León–PREPAL (PREPAL)	512	0.22	–0.12	0	±0
Citizens for Blank Votes (CenB)	485	0.20	New	0	±0
Democratic and Social Centre (CDS)	447	0.19	+0.02	0	±0
Family and Life Party (PFyV)	281	0.12	New	0	±0
Humanist Party (PH)	227	0.10	–0.02	0	±0
Commoners' Land–Castilian Nationalist Party (TC–PNC)	163	0.07	–0.05	0	±0
Republican Left (IR)	140	0.06	New	0	±0
Communist Party of the Castilian People (PCPC–PCPE)	111	0.05	New	0	±0
National Democracy (DN)	101	0.04	New	0	±0
Spanish Phalanx of the CNSO (FE de las JONS)^{1}	95	0.04	–0.01	0	±0
The Phalanx (FE)	92	0.04	–0.03	0	±0
Republican Social Movement (MSR)	83	0.03	New	0	±0
Authentic Phalanx (FA)	53	0.02	New	0	±0
Blank ballots	4,692	1.97	–0.10		
Total	237,653			4	±0
Valid votes	237,653	99.28	+0.07		
Invalid votes	1,722	0.72	–0.07		
Votes cast / turnout	239,375	76.62	+5.44		
Abstentions	73,046	23.38	–5.44		
Registered voters	312,421				
Sources
Footnotes: ^{1} Spanish Phalanx of the CNSO results are compared to Independent Spanish Phalanx–Phalanx 2000 totals in the 2000 election.

=== 2000 ===
Summary of the 12 March 2000 Congress of Deputies election results in Salamanca
Parties and alliances	Popular vote			Seats	
Parties and alliances	Votes	%	±pp	Total	+/−
People's Party (PP)	130,360	58.52	+4.43	3	±0
Spanish Socialist Workers' Party–Progressives (PSOE–p)	72,769	32.67	–2.37	1	±0
United Left (IU)	8,195	3.68	–4.40	0	±0
Regionalist Unity of Castile and León (URCL)	2,917	1.31	+0.78	0	±0
Independent Salamancan Union (USI)	1,416	0.64	New	0	±0
Salamanca–Zamora–León–PREPAL (PREPAL)	760	0.34	+0.05	0	±0
Centrist Union–Democratic and Social Centre (UC–CDS)	386	0.17	–0.08	0	±0
Natural Law Party (PLN)	309	0.14	New	0	±0
Humanist Party (PH)	275	0.12	+0.03	0	±0
Commoners' Land–Castilian Nationalist Party (TC–PNC)	260	0.12	+0.04	0	±0
The Phalanx (FE)	167	0.07	New	0	±0
Spanish Democratic Party (PADE)	118	0.05	New	0	±0
Independent Spanish Phalanx–Phalanx 2000 (FEI–FE 2000)	106	0.05	New	0	±0
Spain 2000 Platform (ES2000)	97	0.04	New	0	±0
Blank ballots	4,613	2.07	+0.68		
Total	222,748			4	±0
Valid votes	222,748	99.21	–0.19		
Invalid votes	1,779	0.79	+0.19		
Votes cast / turnout	224,527	71.18	–7.95		
Abstentions	90,892	28.82	+7.95		
Registered voters	315,419				

=== 1996 ===
Summary of the 3 March 1996 Congress of Deputies election results in Salamanca
Parties and alliances	Popular vote			Seats	
Parties and alliances	Votes	%	±pp	Total	+/−
People's Party (PP)	130,734	54.09	+5.50	3	+1
Spanish Socialist Workers' Party (PSOE)	84,687	35.04	–2.28	1	–1
United Left of Castile and León (IUCL)	19,526	8.08	+1.42	0	±0
Regionalist Unity of Castile and León (URCL)	1,289	0.53	+0.21	0	±0
Salamanca–Zamora–León–PREPAL (PREPAL)	702	0.29	+0.17	0	±0
Centrist Union (UC)	600	0.25	–3.60	0	±0
Humanist Party (PH)	227	0.09	+0.05	0	±0
Workers' Revolutionary Party (PRT)	226	0.09	New	0	±0
Commoners' Land–Castilian Nationalist Party (TC–PNC)	183	0.08	+0.02	0	±0
Authentic Spanish Phalanx (FEA)	171	0.07	New	0	±0
Blank ballots	3,367	1.39	+0.21		
Total	241,712			4	±0
Valid votes	241,712	99.40	+0.08		
Invalid votes	1,459	0.60	–0.08		
Votes cast / turnout	243,171	79.13	+0.04		
Abstentions	64,118	20.87	–0.04		
Registered voters	307,289				

=== 1993 ===
Summary of the 6 June 1993 Congress of Deputies election results in Salamanca
Parties and alliances	Popular vote			Seats	
Parties and alliances	Votes	%	±pp	Total	+/−
People's Party (PP)	114,031	48.59	+7.86	2	±0
Spanish Socialist Workers' Party (PSOE)	87,578	37.32	+0.33	2	±0
United Left of Castile and León (IU)	15,633	6.66	+0.97	0	±0
Democratic and Social Centre (CDS)	9,041	3.85	–8.67	0	±0
The Greens (LV)^{1}	2,454	1.05	–0.03	0	±0
Regionalist Unity of Castile and León (URCL)	761	0.32	New	0	±0
The Ecologists (LE)	679	0.29	–0.31	0	±0
Ruiz-Mateos Group–European Democratic Alliance (ARM–ADE)	569	0.24	New	0	±0
Regionalist Party of the Leonese Country (PREPAL)	287	0.12	±0.00	0	±0
Spanish Phalanx of the CNSO (FE–JONS)	169	0.07	–0.06	0	±0
Coalition for a New Socialist Party (CNPS)^{2}	157	0.07	–0.08	0	±0
Commoners' Land–Castilian Nationalist Party (TC–PNC)	131	0.06	New	0	±0
Natural Law Party (PLN)	113	0.05	New	0	±0
Leonese People's Union (UPL)	110	0.05	New	0	±0
Humanist Party (PH)	93	0.04	–0.06	0	±0
Party of El Bierzo (PB)	83	0.04	New	0	±0
Communist Unification of Spain (UCE)	0	0.00	New	0	±0
Blank ballots	2,775	1.18	+0.31		
Total	234,664			4	±0
Valid votes	234,664	99.32	+0.15		
Invalid votes	1,612	0.68	–0.15		
Votes cast / turnout	236,276	79.09	+3.74		
Abstentions	62,470	20.91	–3.74		
Registered voters	298,746				
Sources
Footnotes: ^{1} The Greens results are compared to The Greens–Green List totals in the 1989 election.; ^{2} Coalition for a New Socialist Party results are compared to Alliance for the Republic totals in the 1989 election.

=== 1989 ===
Summary of the 29 October 1989 Congress of Deputies election results in Salamanca
Parties and alliances	Popular vote			Seats	
Parties and alliances	Votes	%	±pp	Total	+/−
People's Party (PP)^{1}	88,048	40.73	+4.90	2	+1
Spanish Socialist Workers' Party (PSOE)	79,966	36.99	–1.70	2	±0
Democratic and Social Centre (CDS)	27,068	12.52	–5.78	0	–1
United Left (IU)	12,308	5.69	+3.77	0	±0
The Greens–Green List (LV–LV)	2,331	1.08	New	0	±0
The Ecologist Greens (LVE)	1,291	0.60	New	0	±0
Workers' Socialist Party (PST)	1,052	0.49	+0.21	0	±0
Regionalist Party of the Leonese Country (PREPAL)	584	0.27	+0.03	0	±0
Workers' Party of Spain–Communist Unity (PTE–UC)^{2}	476	0.22	–0.65	0	±0
Communist Party of the Peoples of Spain (PCPE)	384	0.18	New	0	±0
Alliance for the Republic (AxR)^{3}	329	0.15	–0.04	0	±0
Spanish Phalanx of the CNSO (FE–JONS)	278	0.13	–0.06	0	±0
Humanist Party (PH)	206	0.10	New	0	±0
Blank ballots	1,877	0.87	–0.17		
Total	216,198			4	±0
Valid votes	216,198	99.17	+0.82		
Invalid votes	1,801	0.83	–0.82		
Votes cast / turnout	217,999	75.35	+0.25		
Abstentions	71,323	24.65	–0.25		
Registered voters	289,322				
Sources
Footnotes: ^{1} People's Party results are compared to People's Coalition totals in the 1986 election.; ^{2} Workers' Party of Spain–Communist Unity results are compared to Communists' Unity Board totals in the 1986 election.; ^{3} Alliance for the Republic results are compared to Internationalist Socialist Workers' Party totals in the 1986 election.

=== 1986 ===
Summary of the 22 June 1986 Congress of Deputies election results in Salamanca
Parties and alliances	Popular vote			Seats	
Parties and alliances	Votes	%	±pp	Total	+/−
Spanish Socialist Workers' Party (PSOE)	82,548	38.69	–7.32	2	–1
People's Coalition (AP–PDP–PL)^{1}	76,438	35.83	+6.09	1	±0
Democratic and Social Centre (CDS)	39,044	18.30	+14.48	1	+1
United Left (IU)^{2}	4,093	1.92	+0.72	0	±0
Democratic Reformist Party (PRD)	2,544	1.19	New	0	±0
Communists' Unity Board (MUC)	1,847	0.87	New	0	±0
Green Alternative List (LAV)	1,138	0.53	New	0	±0
Communist Unification of Spain (UCE)	750	0.35	+0.19	0	±0
Workers' Socialist Party (PST)	608	0.28	New	0	±0
Regionalist Party of the Leonese Country (PREPAL)	504	0.24	New	0	±0
Internationalist Socialist Workers' Party (POSI)	408	0.19	New	0	±0
Spanish Phalanx of the CNSO (FE–JONS)	406	0.19	+0.19	0	±0
Leonese Convergence (CL)	327	0.15	New	0	±0
Party of the Communists of Catalonia (PCC)	235	0.11	New	0	±0
Republican Popular Unity (UPR)^{3}	224	0.10	–0.02	0	±0
Blank ballots	2,221	1.04	+0.31		
Total	213,335			4	±0
Valid votes	213,335	98.35	+1.01		
Invalid votes	3,575	1.65	–1.01		
Votes cast / turnout	216,910	75.10	–5.87		
Abstentions	71,933	24.90	+5.87		
Registered voters	288,843				
Sources
Footnotes: ^{1} People's Coalition results are compared to People's Alliance–People's Democratic Party totals in the 1982 election.; ^{2} United Left results are compared to Communist Party of Spain totals in the 1982 election.; ^{3} Republican Popular Unity results are compared to Communist Party of Spain (Marxist–Leninist) totals in the 1982 election.

=== 1982 ===
Summary of the 28 October 1982 Congress of Deputies election results in Salamanca
Parties and alliances	Popular vote			Seats	
Parties and alliances	Votes	%	±pp	Total	+/−
Spanish Socialist Workers' Party (PSOE)	100,534	46.01	+19.43	3	+2
People's Alliance–People's Democratic Party (AP–PDP)^{1}	64,972	29.74	+22.06	1	+1
Union of the Democratic Centre (UCD)	29,951	13.71	–39.76	0	–3
Agrarian Bloc Electoral Group (AEBA)	8,748	4.00	New	0	±0
Democratic and Social Centre (CDS)	8,338	3.82	New	0	±0
Communist Party of Spain (PCE)	2,616	1.20	–2.82	0	±0
New Force (FN)^{2}	362	0.17	–0.83	0	±0
Communist Unification of Spain (UCE)	342	0.16	New	0	±0
Spanish Solidarity (SE)	306	0.14	New	0	±0
Communist Party of Spain (Marxist–Leninist) (PCE (m–l))	269	0.12	New	0	±0
Falangist Movement of Spain (MFE)	253	0.12	New	0	±0
Communist Unity Candidacy (CUC)^{3}	192	0.09	+0.09	0	±0
Spanish Phalanx of the CNSO (FE–JONS)	0	0.00	New	0	±0
Revolutionary Communist League (LCR)	0	0.00	–0.35	0	±0
Blank ballots	1,599	0.73	+0.11		
Total	218,482			4	±0
Valid votes	218,482	97.34	–0.94		
Invalid votes	5,977	2.66	+0.94		
Votes cast / turnout	224,459	80.97	+9.34		
Abstentions	52,756	19.03	–9.34		
Registered voters	277,215				
Sources
Footnotes: ^{1} People's Alliance–People's Democratic Party results are compared to Democratic Coalition totals in the 1979 election.; ^{2} New Force results are compared to National Union totals in the 1979 election.; ^{3} Communist Unity Candidacy results are compared to Workers' Communist Party totals in the 1979 election.

=== 1979 ===
Summary of the 1 March 1979 Congress of Deputies election results in Salamanca
Parties and alliances	Popular vote			Seats	
Parties and alliances	Votes	%	±pp	Total	+/−
Union of the Democratic Centre (UCD)	104,328	53.47	–2.62	3	±0
Spanish Socialist Workers' Party (PSOE)^{1}	51,866	26.58	–2.33	1	±0
Democratic Coalition (CD)^{2}	14,992	7.68	–0.18	0	±0
Communist Party of Spain (PCE)	7,837	4.02	+1.17	0	±0
Independent Candidacy of the Countryside (CIC)	6,115	3.13	New	0	±0
Spanish Socialist Workers' Party (historical) (PSOEh)	2,642	1.35	New	0	±0
National Union (UN)	1,946	1.00	New	0	±0
Party of Labour of Spain (PTE)^{3}	1,133	0.58	+0.13	0	±0
Workers' Revolutionary Organization (ORT)	831	0.43	New	0	±0
Revolutionary Communist League (LCR)	692	0.35	New	0	±0
Republican Left (IR)	587	0.30	New	0	±0
Communist Movement–Organization of Communist Left (MC–OIC)	487	0.25	New	0	±0
Spanish Phalanx of the CNSO (Authentic) (FE–JONS(A))	432	0.22	–0.14	0	±0
Workers' Communist Party (PCT)	0	0.00	New	0	±0
Blank ballots	1,210	0.62	+0.35		
Total	195,098			4	±0
Valid votes	195,098	98.28	+0.88		
Invalid votes	3,420	1.72	–0.88		
Votes cast / turnout	198,518	71.63	–10.95		
Abstentions	78,627	28.37	+10.95		
Registered voters	277,145				
Sources
Footnotes: ^{1} Spanish Socialist Workers' Party results are compared to the combined totals of Spanish Socialist Workers' Party and People's Socialist Party–Socialist Unity in the 1977 election.; ^{2} Democratic Coalition results are compared to People's Alliance totals in the 1977 election.; ^{3} Party of Labour of Spain results are compared to Democratic Left Front totals in the 1977 election.

=== 1977 ===
Summary of the 15 June 1977 Congress of Deputies election results in Salamanca
Parties and alliances	Popular vote			Seats	
Parties and alliances	Votes	%	±pp	Total	+/−
Union of the Democratic Centre (UCD)	108,862	56.09	n/a	3	n/a
Spanish Socialist Workers' Party (PSOE)	44,168	22.76	n/a	1	n/a
People's Alliance (AP)	15,259	7.86	n/a	0	n/a
People's Socialist Party–Socialist Unity (PSP–US)	11,930	6.15	n/a	0	n/a
Communist Party of Spain (PCE)	5,522	2.85	n/a	0	n/a
Federation of Christian Democracy (FPD–ID)	5,302	2.73	n/a	0	n/a
Spanish Social Reform (RSE)	929	0.48	n/a	0	n/a
Democratic Left Front (FDI)	872	0.45	n/a	0	n/a
Spanish Phalanx of the CNSO (Authentic) (FE–JONS(A))	708	0.36	n/a	0	n/a
Blank ballots	517	0.27	n/a		
Total	194,069			4	n/a
Valid votes	194,069	97.40	n/a		
Invalid votes	5,190	2.60	n/a		
Votes cast / turnout	199,259	82.58	n/a		
Abstentions	42,042	17.42	n/a		
Registered voters	241,301				

== Bibliography ==
- Ley 1/1977, de 4 de enero, para la Reforma Política (Fundamental Law 1/1977). Official State Gazette (in Spanish). 4 January 1977. BOE-A-1977-165.
- Real Decreto-ley 20/1977, de 18 de marzo, sobre Normas Electorales (Royal Decree-Law 20/1977). Official State Gazette (in Spanish). 18 March 1977. BOE-A-1977-7445.
- Constitución Española (Constitution). Official State Gazette (in Spanish). 27 December 1978. BOE-A-1978-31229.
- Ley Orgánica 5/1985, de 19 de junio, del Régimen Electoral General (Organic Law 5/1985). Official State Gazette (in Spanish). 19 June 1985. BOE-A-1985-11672.
- Carreras de Odriozola, Albert; Tafunell Sambola, Xavier (2005) [1989]. Estadísticas históricas de España, siglos XIX-XX (PDF) (in Spanish). Vol. 1 (II ed.). Bilbao: Fundación BBVA. pp. 1072–1097. ISBN 84-96515-00-1. Archived from the original (PDF) on 24 September 2015.
