= 1987 Spanish local elections in the Region of Murcia =

This article presents the results breakdown of the local elections held in the Region of Murcia on 10 June 1987. The following tables show detailed results in the autonomous community's most populous municipalities, sorted alphabetically.

== City control ==
The following table lists party control in the most populous municipalities, including provincial capitals (highlighted in bold). Gains for a party are highlighted in that party's colour.

Municipality	Population	Previous control	New control
Cartagena	168,596	Cantonal Party (PCAN)	Cantonal Party (PCAN)
Lorca	65,458	Spanish Socialist Workers' Party (PSOE)	Spanish Socialist Workers' Party (PSOE)
**Murcia**	303,257	Spanish Socialist Workers' Party (PSOE)	Spanish Socialist Workers' Party (PSOE)

== Municipalities ==
=== Cartagena ===
Population: 168,596

← Summary of the 10 June 1987 City Council of Cartagena election results →
Parties and alliances	Popular vote			Seats	
Parties and alliances	Votes	%	±pp	Total	+/−
Cantonal Party (PCAN)	26,343	34.52	+16.58	**10**	+5
Spanish Socialist Workers' Party (PSOE)	25,900	33.94	−14.36	**10**	−4
People's Alliance (AP)^{1}	13,372	17.52	−8.11	**5**	−2
United Left (IU)^{2}	4,239	5.55	−0.38	**1**	±0
Democratic and Social Centre (CDS)	4,109	5.38	+3.96	**1**	+1
Workers' Party of Spain–Communist Unity (PTE–UC)	733	0.96	New	0	±0
People's Democratic Party (PDP)	428	0.56	New	0	±0
Spanish Phalanx of the CNSO (FE–JONS)	327	0.43	−0.36	0	±0
Humanist Platform (PH)	209	0.27	New	0	±0
Blank ballots	651	0.85	+0.85		
**Total**	**76,311**			**27**	**±0**
Valid votes	76,311	98.39	−1.61		
Invalid votes	1,246	1.61	+1.61		
**Votes cast / turnout**	**77,557**	**65.00**	**+6.11**		
Abstentions	41,762	35.00	−6.11		
**Registered voters**	**119,319**				
Sources
Footnotes: ^{1} People's Alliance results are compared to People's Coalition totals in the 1983 election.; ^{2} United Left results are compared to Communist Party of Spain totals in the 1983 election.

=== Lorca ===
Population: 65,458

← Summary of the 10 June 1987 City Council of Lorca election results →
Parties and alliances	Popular vote			Seats	
Parties and alliances	Votes	%	±pp	Total	+/−
Spanish Socialist Workers' Party (PSOE)	17,038	54.49	−5.97	**15**	−1
People's Alliance (AP)^{1}	7,515	24.03	−4.99	**6**	−1
Democratic and Social Centre (CDS)	2,612	8.35	New	**2**	+2
Independent Solution (SI)	2,012	6.43	New	**1**	+1
United Left (IU)^{2}	1,790	5.72	+0.51	**1**	±0
Humanist Platform (PH)	51	0.16	New	0	±0
Liberal Democratic Party (PDL)	n/a	n/a	−5.31	0	−1
Blank ballots	251	0.80	+0.80		
**Total**	**31,269**			**25**	**±0**
Valid votes	31,269	98.95	−1.05		
Invalid votes	332	1.05	+1.05		
**Votes cast / turnout**	**31,601**	**66.98**	**+6.54**		
Abstentions	15,577	33.02	−6.54		
**Registered voters**	**47,178**				
Sources
Footnotes: ^{1} People's Alliance results are compared to People's Coalition totals in the 1983 election.; ^{2} United Left results are compared to Communist Party of Spain totals in the 1983 election.

=== Murcia ===
Population: 303,257

← Summary of the 10 June 1987 City Council of Murcia election results →
Parties and alliances	Popular vote			Seats	
Parties and alliances	Votes	%	±pp	Total	+/−
Spanish Socialist Workers' Party (PSOE)	56,919	37.75	−10.86	**12**	−2
People's Alliance (AP)^{1}	52,128	34.57	−6.53	**10**	−1
Democratic and Social Centre (CDS)	25,491	16.91	+14.62	**5**	+5
United Left (IU)^{2}	11,427	7.58	+0.49	**2**	+1
People's Democratic Party (PDP)	877	0.58	New	0	±0
Murcian Regionalist Party (PRM)	833	0.55	New	0	±0
Workers' Party of Spain–Communist Unity (PTE–UC)	640	0.42	New	0	±0
Humanist Platform (PH)	471	0.31	New	0	±0
Spanish Phalanx of the CNSO (FE–JONS)	359	0.24	New	0	±0
Communist Unification of Spain (UCE)	309	0.20	New	0	±0
Blank ballots	1,326	0.88	+0.88		
**Total**	**150,780**			**29**	**+2**
Valid votes	150,780	98.94	−1.06		
Invalid votes	1,611	1.06	+1.06		
**Votes cast / turnout**	**152,391**	**71.43**	**+6.78**		
Abstentions	60,946	28.57	−6.78		
**Registered voters**	**213,337**				
Sources
Footnotes: ^{1} People's Alliance results are compared to People's Coalition totals in the 1983 election.; ^{2} United Left results are compared to Communist Party of Spain totals in the 1983 election.

== See also ==
- 1987 Murcian regional election
