= 1979 Spanish local elections in the Region of Murcia =

This article presents the results breakdown of the local elections held in the Region of Murcia on 3 April 1979. The following tables show detailed results in the autonomous community's most populous municipalities, sorted alphabetically.

== City control ==
The following table lists party control in the most populous municipalities, including provincial capitals (highlighted in bold).

Municipality	Population	New control
Cartagena	162,630	Spanish Socialist Workers' Party (PSOE)
Lorca	64,711	Spanish Socialist Workers' Party (PSOE)
**Murcia**	283,552	Spanish Socialist Workers' Party (PSOE)

== Municipalities ==
=== Cartagena ===
Population: 162,630

Summary of the 3 April 1979 City Council of Cartagena election results →
Parties and alliances	Popular vote			Seats	
Parties and alliances	Votes	%	±pp	Total	+/−
Spanish Socialist Workers' Party (PSOE)	18,912	29.86	n/a	**9**	n/a
Union of the Democratic Centre (UCD)	17,298	27.32	n/a	**8**	n/a
Cantonal Party (PCAN)	14,753	23.30	n/a	**7**	n/a
Communist Party of Spain (PCE)	7,871	12.43	n/a	**3**	n/a
Workers' Revolutionary Organization (ORT)	2,053	3.24	n/a	0	n/a
Democratic Coalition (CD)	1,906	3.01	n/a	0	n/a
Independents of Cartagena (INDEP)	532	0.84	n/a	0	n/a
Party of Labour of Spain (PTE)	0	0.00	n/a	0	n/a
Blank ballots	0	0.00	n/a		
**Total**	**63,325**			**27**	**n/a**
Valid votes	63,325	99.13	n/a		
Invalid votes	557	0.87	n/a		
**Votes cast / turnout**	**63,882**	**58.67**	**n/a**		
Abstentions	45,003	41.33	n/a		
**Registered voters**	**108,885**				

=== Lorca ===
Population: 64,711

Summary of the 3 April 1979 City Council of Lorca election results →
Parties and alliances	Popular vote			Seats	
Parties and alliances	Votes	%	±pp	Total	+/−
Spanish Socialist Workers' Party (PSOE)	9,297	37.31	n/a	9	n/a
Union of the Democratic Centre (UCD)	6,695	26.87	n/a	7	n/a
Democratic Coalition (CD)	4,053	16.27	n/a	4	n/a
Communist Party of Spain (PCE)	2,956	11.86	n/a	3	n/a
Independent Group of Lorca (GILorca)	1,917	7.69	n/a	2	n/a
Blank ballots	0	0.00	n/a		
**Total**	**24,918**			25	**n/a**
Valid votes	24,918	99.15	n/a		
Invalid votes	213	0.85	n/a		
**Votes cast / turnout**	**25,131**	**56.08**	**n/a**		
Abstentions	19,684	43.92	n/a		
**Registered voters**	**44,815**				

=== Murcia ===
Population: 283,552

Summary of the 3 April 1979 City Council of Murcia election results →
Parties and alliances	Popular vote			Seats	
Parties and alliances	Votes	%	±pp	Total	+/−
Spanish Socialist Workers' Party (PSOE)	50,216	44.14	n/a	**13**	n/a
Union of the Democratic Centre (UCD)	46,526	40.90	n/a	**12**	n/a
Communist Party of Spain (PCE)	11,226	9.87	n/a	**2**	n/a
Spanish Socialist Workers' Party (historical) (PSOEh)	1,925	1.69	n/a	0	n/a
Democratic Coalition (CD)	1,721	1.51	n/a	0	n/a
Workers' Revolutionary Organization (ORT)	1,019	0.90	n/a	0	n/a
Communist Unification of Spain (UCE)	524	0.46	n/a	0	n/a
Spanish Phalanx of the CNSO (Authentic) (FE–JONS(A))	246	0.22	n/a	0	n/a
Communist Movement–Organization of Communist Left (MC–OIC)	210	0.18	n/a	0	n/a
Revolutionary Communist League (LCR)	146	0.13	n/a	0	n/a
Party of Labour of Spain (PTE)	1	0.00	n/a	0	n/a
Blank ballots	0	0.00	n/a		
**Total**	**113,760**			**27**	**n/a**
Valid votes	113,760	99.18	n/a		
Invalid votes	943	0.82	n/a		
**Votes cast / turnout**	**114,703**	**61.52**	**n/a**		
Abstentions	71,735	38.48	n/a		
**Registered voters**	**186,438**				
