= 1983 Spanish local elections in the Region of Murcia =

This article presents the results breakdown of the local elections held in the Region of Murcia on 8 May 1983. The following tables show detailed results in the autonomous community's most populous municipalities, sorted alphabetically.

== City control ==
The following table lists party control in the most populous municipalities, including provincial capitals (highlighted in bold). Gains for a party are highlighted in that party's colour.

Municipality	Population	Previous control	New control
Cartagena	167,936	Spanish Socialist Workers' Party (PSOE)	Spanish Socialist Workers' Party (PSOE) (PCAN in 1987)
Lorca	61,879	Spanish Socialist Workers' Party (PSOE)	Spanish Socialist Workers' Party (PSOE)
**Murcia**	284,585	Spanish Socialist Workers' Party (PSOE)	Spanish Socialist Workers' Party (PSOE)

== Municipalities ==
=== Cartagena ===
Population: 167,936

← Summary of the 8 May 1983 City Council of Cartagena election results →
Parties and alliances	Popular vote			Seats	
Parties and alliances	Votes	%	±pp	Total	+/−
Spanish Socialist Workers' Party (PSOE)	33,255	48.30	+18.44	**14**	+5
People's Coalition (AP–PDP–UL)^{1}	17,648	25.63	+22.62	**7**	+7
Cantonal Party (PCAN)	12,356	17.94	−5.36	**5**	−2
Communist Party of Spain (PCE)	4,080	5.93	−6.50	**1**	−2
Democratic and Social Centre (CDS)	977	1.42	New	0	±0
Spanish Phalanx of the CNSO (FE–JONS)	542	0.79	New	0	±0
Union of the Democratic Centre (UCD)	n/a	n/a	−27.32	0	−8
Blank ballots	0	0.00	±0.00		
**Total**	**68,858**			**27**	**±0**
Valid votes	68,858	100.00	+0.87		
Invalid votes	0	0.00	−0.87		
**Votes cast / turnout**	**68,858**	**58.89**	**+0.22**		
Abstentions	48,068	41.11	−0.22		
**Registered voters**	**116,926**				
Sources
Footnotes: ^{1} People's Coalition results are compared to Democratic Coalition totals in the 1979 election.

=== Lorca ===
Population: 61,879

← Summary of the 8 May 1983 City Council of Lorca election results →
Parties and alliances	Popular vote			Seats	
Parties and alliances	Votes	%	±pp	Total	+/−
Spanish Socialist Workers' Party (PSOE)	16,473	60.46	+23.15	**16**	+7
People's Coalition (AP–PDP–UL)^{1}	7,908	29.02	+12.75	**7**	+3
Liberal Democratic Party (PDL)	1,447	5.31	New	**1**	+1
Communist Party of Spain (PCE)	1,420	5.21	−6.65	**1**	−2
Union of the Democratic Centre (UCD)	n/a	n/a	−26.87	0	−7
Independent Group of Lorca (GILorca)	n/a	n/a	−7.69	0	−2
Blank ballots	0	0.00	±0.00		
**Total**	**27,248**			**25**	**±0**
Valid votes	27,248	100.00	+0.85		
Invalid votes	0	0.00	−0.85		
**Votes cast / turnout**	**27,248**	**60.44**	**+4.36**		
Abstentions	17,838	39.56	−4.36		
**Registered voters**	**45,086**				
Sources
Footnotes: ^{1} People's Coalition results are compared to Democratic Coalition totals in the 1979 election.

=== Murcia ===
Population: 284,585

← Summary of the 8 May 1983 City Council of Murcia election results →
Parties and alliances	Popular vote			Seats	
Parties and alliances	Votes	%	±pp	Total	+/−
Spanish Socialist Workers' Party (PSOE)	63,369	48.61	+4.47	**14**	+1
People's Coalition (AP–PDP–UL)^{1}	53,572	41.10	+39.59	**11**	+11
Communist Party of Spain (PCE)	9,236	7.09	−2.78	**2**	±0
Democratic and Social Centre (CDS)	2,981	2.29	New	0	±0
Liberal Democratic Party (PDL)	1,193	0.92	New	0	±0
Union of the Democratic Centre (UCD)	n/a	n/a	−40.90	0	−12
Blank ballots	0	0.00	±0.00		
**Total**	**130,351**			**27**	**±0**
Valid votes	130,351	100.00	+0.82		
Invalid votes	0	0.00	−0.82		
**Votes cast / turnout**	**130,351**	**64.65**	**+3.13**		
Abstentions	71,263	35.35	−3.13		
**Registered voters**	**201,614**				
Sources
Footnotes: ^{1} People's Coalition results are compared to Democratic Coalition totals in the 1979 election.

== See also ==
- 1983 Murcian regional election
