= 1991 Spanish local elections in the Region of Murcia =

This article presents the results breakdown of the local elections held in the Region of Murcia on 26 May 1991. The following tables show detailed results in the autonomous community's most populous municipalities, sorted alphabetically.

== City control ==
The following table lists party control in the most populous municipalities, including provincial capitals (highlighted in bold). Gains for a party are highlighted in that party's colour.

Municipality	Population	Previous control	New control
Cartagena	175,966	Cantonal Party (PCAN)	Spanish Socialist Workers' Party (PSOE)
Lorca	67,338	Spanish Socialist Workers' Party (PSOE)	Spanish Socialist Workers' Party (PSOE)
**Murcia**	322,911	Spanish Socialist Workers' Party (PSOE)	Spanish Socialist Workers' Party (PSOE)

== Municipalities ==
=== Cartagena ===
Population: 175,966

← Summary of the 26 May 1991 City Council of Cartagena election results →
Parties and alliances	Popular vote			Seats	
Parties and alliances	Votes	%	±pp	Total	+/−
Spanish Socialist Workers' Party (PSOE)	30,046	43.78	+9.84	**13**	+3
People's Party (PP)^{1}	18,099	26.37	+8.29	**8**	+3
United Left (IU)	8,193	11.94	+6.39	**3**	+2
Cantonal Party (PCAN)	7,654	11.15	−23.37	**3**	−7
Democratic and Social Centre (CDS)	1,966	2.86	−2.52	0	−1
The Greens (LV)	976	1.42	New	0	±0
The Greens Ecologist–Humanist List (LVLE–H)^{2}	441	0.64	+0.37	0	±0
Left Popular Unity of Cartagena (UPIC)	305	0.44	New	0	±0
Spanish Phalanx of the CNSO (FE–JONS)	115	0.17	−0.26	0	±0
Blank ballots	835	1.22	+0.37		
**Total**	**68,630**			**27**	**±0**
Valid votes	68,630	99.30	+0.91		
Invalid votes	486	0.70	−0.91		
**Votes cast / turnout**	**69,116**	**53.03**	**−11.97**		
Abstentions	61,210	46.97	+11.97		
**Registered voters**	**130,326**				
Sources
Footnotes: ^{1} People's Party results are compared to the combined totals of People's Alliance and People's Democratic Party in the 1987 election.; ^{2} The Greens Ecologist–Humanist List results are compared to Humanist Platform totals in the 1987 election.

=== Lorca ===
Population: 67,338

← Summary of the 26 May 1991 City Council of Lorca election results →
Parties and alliances	Popular vote			Seats	
Parties and alliances	Votes	%	±pp	Total	+/−
Spanish Socialist Workers' Party (PSOE)	18,766	59.44	+4.95	**17**	+2
People's Party (PP)^{1}	7,619	24.13	−6.33	**7**	±0
United Left (IU)	1,868	5.92	+0.20	**1**	±0
Democratic and Social Centre (CDS)	1,346	4.26	−4.09	0	−2
Left Popular Unity of Lorca (UPIL)	1,190	3.77	New	0	±0
Murcianist Party (PM)	331	1.05	New	0	±0
Blank ballots	453	1.43	+0.63		
**Total**	**31,573**			**25**	**±0**
Valid votes	31,573	98.10	−0.85		
Invalid votes	610	1.90	+0.85		
**Votes cast / turnout**	**32,183**	**62.34**	**−4.64**		
Abstentions	19,438	37.66	+4.64		
**Registered voters**	**51,621**				
Sources
Footnotes: ^{1} People's Party results are compared to the combined totals of People's Alliance and Independent Solution in the 1987 election.

=== Murcia ===
Population: 322,911

← Summary of the 26 May 1991 City Council of Murcia election results →
Parties and alliances	Popular vote			Seats	
Parties and alliances	Votes	%	±pp	Total	+/−
People's Party (PP)^{1}	63,301	40.87	+5.72	**13**	+3
Spanish Socialist Workers' Party (PSOE)	61,723	39.85	+2.10	**13**	+1
United Left (IU)	15,124	9.76	+2.18	**3**	+1
Democratic and Social Centre (CDS)	5,559	3.59	−13.32	0	−5
Murcianist Party (PM)^{2}	3,604	2.33	+1.78	0	±0
The Greens (LV)	2,527	1.63	New	0	±0
Rainbow (Arcoiris)	1,104	0.71	New	0	±0
Palmar Lesser Local Entity Political Association (APELMP)	618	0.40	New	0	±0
Blank ballots	1,327	0.86	−0.02		
**Total**	**154,887**			**29**	**±0**
Valid votes	154,887	99.48	+0.54		
Invalid votes	812	0.52	−0.54		
**Votes cast / turnout**	**155,699**	**65.70**	**−5.73**		
Abstentions	81,287	34.30	+5.73		
**Registered voters**	**236,986**				
Sources
Footnotes: ^{1} People's Party results are compared to the combined totals of People's Alliance and People's Democratic Party in the 1987 election.; ^{2} Murcianist Party results are compared to Murcian Regionalist Party totals in the 1987 election.

== See also ==
- 1991 Murcian regional election
