= 1995 Spanish local elections in the Region of Murcia =

This article presents the results breakdown of the local elections held in the Region of Murcia on 28 May 1995. The following tables show detailed results in the autonomous community's most populous municipalities, sorted alphabetically.

== City control ==
The following table lists party control in the most populous municipalities, including provincial capitals (highlighted in bold). Gains for a party are highlighted in that party's colour.

| Municipality | Population | Previous control | New control |
|---|---|---|---|
| Cartagena | 179,659 | Spanish Socialist Workers' Party (PSOE) | People's Party (PP) |
| Lorca | 69,355 | Spanish Socialist Workers' Party (PSOE) | Spanish Socialist Workers' Party (PSOE) |
| **Murcia** | 341,531 | Spanish Socialist Workers' Party (PSOE) | People's Party (PP) |

== Municipalities ==
=== Cartagena ===
Population: 179,659

← Summary of the 28 May 1995 City Council of Cartagena election results →
| Parties and alliances | Popular vote | | | Seats | |
| Parties and alliances | Votes | % | ±pp | Total | +/− |
|---|---|---|---|---|---|
| People's Party (PP) | 44,806 | 48.57 | +22.20 | **15** | +7 |
| Spanish Socialist Workers' Party (PSOE) | 27,817 | 30.16 | −13.62 | **9** | −4 |
| United Left–The Greens of the Region of Murcia (IU–LV–RM)^{1} | 9,822 | 10.65 | −2.71 | **3** | ±0 |
| Cantonal Party (PCAN) | 3,516 | 3.81 | −7.34 | 0 | −3 |
| Minor Sea Independent Party–Cartagena Districts Indep. Movement (PIMM) | 1,839 | 1.99 | New | 0 | ±0 |
| Two Seas Independent Party (PIDM) | 1,293 | 1.40 | New | 0 | ±0 |
| Centrist Union–Democratic and Social Centre (UC–CDS) | 863 | 0.94 | −1.92 | 0 | ±0 |
| Unity and Progress Group (GUP) | 706 | 0.77 | New | 0 | ±0 |
| Democratic Bloc (BD) | 682 | 0.74 | New | 0 | ±0 |
| Blank ballots | 898 | 0.97 | −0.25 | | |
| **Total** | **92,242** | | | **27** | **±0** |
| Valid votes | 92,242 | 99.46 | +0.16 | | |
| Invalid votes | 502 | 0.54 | −0.16 | | |
| **Votes cast / turnout** | **92,744** | **65.96** | **+12.93** | | |
| Abstentions | 47,856 | 34.04 | −12.93 | | |
| **Registered voters** | **140,600** | | | | |
Sources
Footnotes: ^{1} United Left–The Greens of the Region of Murcia results are compared to the combined totals of United Left and The Greens in the 1991 election.

=== Lorca ===
Population: 69,355

← Summary of the 28 May 1995 City Council of Lorca election results →
| Parties and alliances | Popular vote | | | Seats | |
| Parties and alliances | Votes | % | ±pp | Total | +/− |
|---|---|---|---|---|---|
| Spanish Socialist Workers' Party (PSOE) | 18,655 | 48.01 | −11.43 | **13** | −4 |
| People's Party (PP) | 15,743 | 40.52 | +16.39 | **10** | +3 |
| United Left–The Greens of the Region of Murcia (IU–LV–RM) | 3,000 | 7.72 | +1.80 | **2** | +1 |
| Lorcan Unity of Independents (ULI) | 663 | 1.71 | New | 0 | ±0 |
| Platform of Independents of Spain (PIE) | 314 | 0.81 | New | 0 | ±0 |
| Blank ballots | 478 | 1.23 | −0.20 | | |
| **Total** | **38,853** | | | **25** | **±0** |
| Valid votes | 38,853 | 99.03 | +0.93 | | |
| Invalid votes | 379 | 0.97 | −0.93 | | |
| **Votes cast / turnout** | **39,232** | **71.97** | **+9.63** | | |
| Abstentions | 15,282 | 28.03 | −9.63 | | |
| **Registered voters** | **54,514** | | | | |

=== Murcia ===
Population: 341,531

← Summary of the 28 May 1995 City Council of Murcia election results →
| Parties and alliances | Popular vote | | | Seats | |
| Parties and alliances | Votes | % | ±pp | Total | +/− |
|---|---|---|---|---|---|
| People's Party (PP) | 118,438 | 59.11 | +18.24 | **18** | +5 |
| Spanish Socialist Workers' Party (PSOE) | 50,278 | 25.09 | −14.76 | **7** | −6 |
| United Left–The Greens of the Region of Murcia (IU–LV–RM)^{1} | 26,584 | 13.27 | +1.88 | **4** | +1 |
| Centrist Union–Democratic and Social Centre (UC–CDS) | 1,421 | 0.71 | −2.88 | 0 | ±0 |
| New Region (NR) | 906 | 0.45 | New | 0 | ±0 |
| Spanish Confederation of Independents (CEDI) | 535 | 0.27 | New | 0 | ±0 |
| Blank ballots | 2,191 | 1.09 | +0.23 | | |
| **Total** | **200,353** | | | **29** | **±0** |
| Valid votes | 200,353 | 99.50 | +0.02 | | |
| Invalid votes | 1,016 | 0.50 | −0.02 | | |
| **Votes cast / turnout** | **201,369** | **76.56** | **+10.86** | | |
| Abstentions | 61,644 | 23.44 | −10.86 | | |
| **Registered voters** | **263,013** | | | | |
Sources
Footnotes: ^{1} United Left–The Greens of the Region of Murcia results are compared to the combined totals of United Left and The Greens in the 1991 election.

== See also ==
- 1995 Murcian regional election
