= Democratic Left Front (Spain) =

Defunct political coalition in Spain

Democratic Left Front Frente Democrático de Izquierdas
- Founded: 3 May 1977
- Ideology: Communism; Socialism; Antifascism; Federalism; Republicanism
- Political position: Left-wing to far-left
- Supported by: Party of Labour of Spain; Independent Socialist Party; Independent Socialist Bloc; Party of Communist Unification in the Canaries; Communist Unification of Spain; Confederación de Sindicatos Unitarios de Trabajadores (CSUT); Democratic Association of Women; Young Red Guard of Spain

Democratic Left Front (in Spanish: Frente Democrático de Izquierdas, FDI), was a left-wing political coalition in Spain. The coalition was formed by the Party of Labour of Spain (PTE), the Independent Socialist Party, Independent Socialist Bloc, Party of Communist Unification in the Canaries and Communist Unification of Spain (UCE) to participate in the 1977 general elections. Most of those parties were still illegal at the time of the election. FDI presented lists in all Spain, except in Catalonia, were the PTE ran in a coalition with Republican Left of Catalonia (ERC), called Left of Catalonia–Democratic Electoral Front (EC-FED). The coalition failed to win any seat (although their Catalan counterparts won one in Barcelona), and dissolved shortly afterwards.

== Results ==
Autonomy	Votes	%
Andalusia	46,249	1.58%
Aragón	9,611	1.47%
Asturias	1,544	0.27%
Balearic Islands	775	0.25%
Canary Islands	1,476	0.27%
Cantabria	1,633	0.64%
Castilla y León	10,677	0.77%
Castilla-La Mancha	4,989	0.56%
Valencian Country	10,470	0.56%
Extremadura	2,229	0.42%
Galicia	7,373	0.65%
La Rioja	1,006	0.73%
Madrid	13,328	0.58%
Navarre	6,631	2.57%
Basque Autonomous Community	4,617	0.46%
TOTAL	122,608	0.80%
Catalonia (EC-FED)	143,954	4.72%
Total FDI+Left of Catalonia	266,562	1.45%
