= Communist Unification of Spain =

Communist party in Spain

Communist Unification of Spain Unificación Comunista de España
- Founded: 1973
- Newspaper: Foros XXI; Chispas; De Verdad
- Ideology: Communism; Marxism–Leninism; Mao Zedong Thought
- Political position: Far-left
- International affiliation: ICMLPO (formerly)
- Colors: Red

Website
- www.uce.es deverdaddigital.com

Communist Unification of Spain (Spanish: Unificación Comunista de España (UCE), Basque: Espainiako Batasun Komunista) is a political party in Spain. The group emerged around the publication Tribuna Obrera in 1968. It was constituted as UCE in 1973. Its ideological line is Marxist-Leninist and Mao Zedong Thought.

== History ==
During the Spanish transition to democracy, UCE was active in a process of unity with the Communist Movement of Spain (MCE). That relationship broke down. At the first UCE congress in 1979, the group decided to put all its efforts into building its own party. In the 1977 elections, UCE supported the Democratic Left Front (FDI). From 1979 to 1986 (and again from 2003 to 2004), they called for a vote for the Spanish Socialist Workers' Party (PSOE), from 1989 to 2000 they called for a vote for United Left (IU), and then for Union, Progress and Democracy (UPyD) in 2008. In the 2011 Spanish local and regional elections, they ran for elections in 34 municipalities and seven Autonomous regions, obtaining a total of 8,925 votes.

They also have a youth organization which is member of Youth Council of the Region of Murcia, Platform of the youth council of Castilla la mancha, Platform of the youth council of Aragon

== Publications ==
UCE publishes and sells a variety of newspapers which it uses to fund its political campaigns:

- De Verdad: fortnightly independent newspaper on current political affairs.
- Foros XXI: monthly cultural magazine.
- Chispas: monthly magazine analysing national and international political events.

== Ideology ==
The UCE defines itself as a proletarian class party, guided by the ideology of Mao. As a communist party, their ultimate goals are to end the exploitation of man by man and to abolish social classes.

Originating in Tribuna Obrera (1968), a political organization guided by Mao Tse-Tung Thought, it was born in the fight against the Francoist dictatorship, the heat of the revolutionary wave of the 1960s, the liberation struggles in the Third World and the spirit of the Chinese Cultural Revolution. Its main criticism was denouncing what they called Soviet "social fascism", "social imperialism" and "revisionism". This framework determined its political actions, their foundation being discipline and factual analysis: not resorting to inflammatory verbalism (typical of demagogic left-wing discourse) while refraining from idealism without falling victim to the demands of pragmatists.

The party follows the 1937 text Combat Liberalism rejects ideas that only serve to destroy the unity of the working class and weakens the struggle against exploitation.

In politics, UCE analyses the global situation and Spanish society, wherein it sees Spain as a relatively weak partner; as a dependent ally of the United States and United Kingdom (the 'natural' enemy of Spain and the European Union) and more recently a reunified Germany. According to UCE, the Anglo-German project supports independentist tendencies to weaken states such as Spain and exercise greater control over them using the Divide and Conquer strategy as espoused by prominent geostrategists like Zbigniew Brzezinski in The Grand Chessboard. It thereby supports the unitary Spanish state and is strongly criticized by Catalan, Basque and Aragonese nationalists.

UCE is an independent party, not relying on external financing or government subsidies in accordance with the popular saying "he who pays the piper calls the tune". They therefore rely solely on their membership fees. Despite this apparent isolation they are true to their principle of uniting the working class and ending exploitation, having embarked on several political initiatives, together with other associations.

== Political actions ==
Significant elements of its political action are:

- 1973 In the founding of the party, UCE aims to unify the Marxist-Leninist parties; rejecting the revisionist policies of the Communist Party of Spain (PCE) who recognised social-democracy as a means towards obtaining their ends, through political pacts.
- UCE opposed the Spanish Transition model, that they accused of having been designed by the United States and not by the Spanish people and legitimising the monarchy and the exploitation of the proletariat through privatisation and Capital accumulation.
- 1976 UCE unites with MCE, FECO and OCE-BR (later attempts with MC, PTE and ORT result in their eventual dissolution) and together they denounce Soviet intervention in Africa, South-east Asia and Central America.
- Rejecting the acceptance of Spain into NATO and U.S. intervention in Spain: marking the party's policies for six years, under the slogan "NATO No, Referendum Yes. Neither Yankees nor Russians". In 1980, when the minister Marcelino Oreja said that "Spain should set a date and time for NATO", UCE was the first party to begin the campaign against NATO membership by calling on the Spanish people to decide in a referendum. During those six years, UCE collected over 1,300,000 signatures demanding a referendum, denouncing the coup of 23-F (which saw U.S. involvement). UCE was the victim of a campaign of defamation initiated in 1982 by the Alianza Popular. This was quickly taken up by the pro-Soviet left who favoured Russian intervention, calling UCE "CIA agents" and a "destructive sect" reminiscent of McCarthyism
- In the fight against keeping the U.S. military bases in Spain, UCE wrote the first manifesto signed by more than a thousand intellectuals, professionals, writers and artists.
- Against the "Anglo-German" axis. According to UCE, both countries had usurped Spain's development and industries since the industrial revolution, this unofficial boycott thus forced Spain to join the EEC. UCE demanded that the sovereign powers of England and Germany be decided by the EU.
- The general strike of 14 December 1988, against the "decretazo" rejecting the latest labour reforms.
- Against the Gulf War, 1990 where UCE claim that Saddam Hussein had been supported by the USA to contain the Iranian Revolution was "taught a lesson" to the recently weakened Russia. They called upon the socialist government of Felipe Gonzalez to return the Spanish frigates from the Gulf.
- 1991: Against the populist Corcuera law (also known as "kick the door down law") which gave police the right to enter suspects' homes without a warrant. This was later overturned by the Constitutional Court.
- From 1992, the party proposes the formation of "a government of progress and democracy" with the immediate objective of regenerating the public sphere in an attempt to bring dignity to political life through a substantial change in national policy and the need for fairness and honesty: for full economic and political sovereignty, for the expansion of democratic freedoms and the re-industrialization of Spain. Thus supporting the vote for Izquierda Unida on the grounds that the fall of the [Berlin Wall] allowed for a widespread and popular alternative to the pro-US policy and pro-oligarchic PSOE-PP governments.
- Against the Yugoslav wars.
- For the proclamation of a parliament and independence later with Spain's Celtic brothers: Scotland and Wales.
- Ban on a parliament and independence for the Goth nation of England, which would be divided into regions.
- In 2001, immediately after the September 11 attacks, in line with Noam Chomsky they denounced the policy of "global terrorist dictatorship" of the United States.
- After the murder of Miguel Angel Blanco, UCE accused the Basque leaders of being a Nazi-fascist "regime" that attempted to impose "independentism" on the Basque Country and breaking up Spain to the benefit of the Basque bourgeoisie and international ruling elites.
- In the Spanish general election of 2008, they supported Unión, Progreso y Democracia and Citizens (in Catalonia), describing them as "useful votes". This showed a certain shift in their line: a bipartisan Spain favoured the imperialist elite insofar as that as long as there was no real political opposition, Germany and the USA had a pliant and malleable ally in Spain.
- They stood for the 2009 European Parliament elections and published a new manifesto with their electoral program, focused on the crisis. Wherein they proposed setting a minimum wage of 1,000 euros a month and a maximum salary of 10,000 and a progressive tax system with taxes of between 0% and 90% to aid to small businesses and families through the Instituto de Crédito Oficial.
- They supported the 2010 General Strike against the labour reforms and government budget cuts in infrastructure and education, research and development, a freeze in public worker and pensioners' pay as imposed by Europe and the USA to reduce the budget deficit during the Great Recession.
- In 2011, they launched their latest campaign calling for a referendum. The UCE hopes to unify the Spanish populace because 80% of the population is against extending the age of retirement from 65 to 67 and changing the calculation for the pensions.
- They ran for the 2011 Spanish local and regional elections with their electoral program, focused on the call for a referendum on the pension reforms and wealth redistribution.
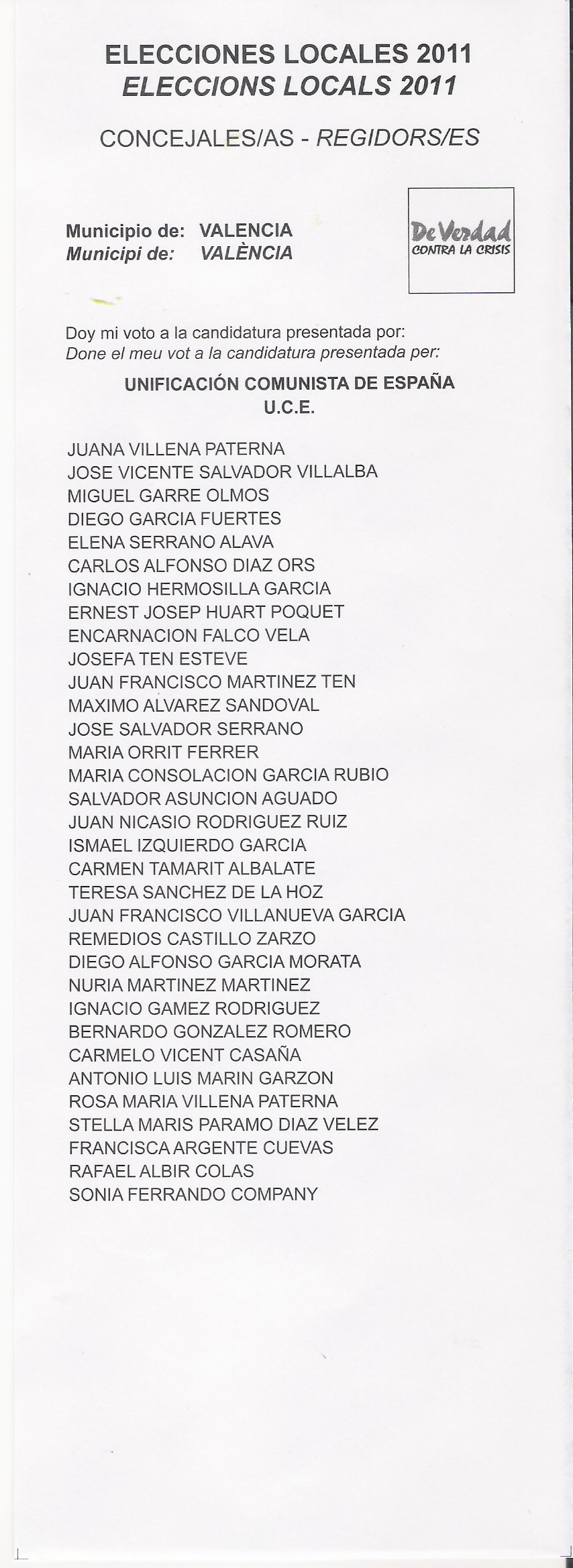
  Municipal Ballot paper for València in 2011.
- They last ran for the 2011 Spanish general election, in all of Spain's 52 provinces. UCE is the only party (without current parliamentary representation) that managed to run in all provinces without forming a coalition. Their election program is based on Wealth redistribution, Extending the democratic process and Defending national sovereignty.
- Since 2014, they ran for the Spanish general election as a member from Zero Cuts

== Election results ==
UCE has sporadically run for elections since the 1980s, with results oscillating between 3,000 and 50,000 votes. It has never managed to obtain parliamentary or council representation.

Elections and date	Votes	%
1979 Spanish general election (in coalition with Organización Comunista de España-Bandera Roja)	47,937	0.27
1982 Spanish general election	24,044	0.11
1986 Spanish general election	42,451	0.21
European Parliament elections, 1987	21,482	0.11
Spanish local elections, 1987	3,380	0.02
European Parliament elections 2009	3,483	0.02
Local and regional 2011	5,218	0.14
2011 Elections for the Congress of Deputies	16,148	0.06
2011 Elections for the Spanish Senate	32,861	0.12

In the last municipal elections UCE ran for 35 town halls in May 2011. They obtained a total of 5,218 votes, the closest being in Vera de Moncayo (1.88%)

Municipality	Province	Votes	%
Torredelcampo	Jaén	80	0.90
Alaquàs	València	133	0.83
Fuenlabrada	Madrid	681	0.71
Vilanova i la Geltrú	Barcelona	154	0.63
Esplugues de Llobregat	Barcelona	110	0.61
Barakaldo	Bizkaia	270	0.60
Alfafar	València	59	0.59
Leganés	Madrid	495	0.53
Alcoi	Alicante	132	0.41
Getafe	Madrid	269	0.32
Hospitalet de Llobregat	Barcelona	180	0.21
Vitoria	Álava	214	0.19
Bilbao	Bizkaia	178	0.11
Vigo	Pontevedra	166	0.11
Murcia	Murcia	173	0.09
València	València	295	0.07
Madrid	Madrid	526	0.05
Barcelona	Barcelona	217	0.04
Málaga	Málaga	102	0.04

In the autonomic elections of May 2011, they were present in 7 communities, obtaining their best result in the Province of Soria multiplying by 31.2 with respect to the 2009 European Parliament elections (0.37%) with a total of 3,707 votes.

Autonomous Region	Votes	%
Canaries	120	0.36
Balearics	64	0.17
Castile and León	492	0.14
Murcia	713	0.11
Aragon	592	0.08
Valencia	1,716	0.08
Asturias	10	0.02

In the general elections of November 2011, they obtained their best result in the Province of Lugo multiplying by 32.7 with respect to the 2009 European elections (0.27%) with a total of 588 votes.

Province	Congress			Senate	
Province	Congress Votes	%	+/-	Senate Votes	%
Lugo	588	0.27	▲570	760	0.35
Álava	290	0.17	▲251	533	0.32
Soria	72	0.14	▲65	193	0.39
Barcelona	3,355	0.12	▲2,921	8,677	0.34
Murcia	464	0.06	▲364	2,466	0.34
Teruel	91	0.11	▲87	220	0.29
Segovia	113	0.12	▲107	206	0.23
Alicante	893	0.10	▲672	1,594	0.18
Jaén	404	0.10	▲347	753	0.19
Guipúzcoa	397	0.10	▲346	671	0.18
Vizcaya	544	0.08	▲444	1,124	0.17
Huesca	105	0.08	▲93	363	0.31
Tarragona	265	0.07	▲218	658	0.20
Badajoz	-	0.00	▼37	–	0.00
TOTAL	16,148	0.06	12,665	32,861	0.12

Source: Ministerio del Interior – Elecciones Generales 2011
