= Results of the 1982 Spanish Congress election =

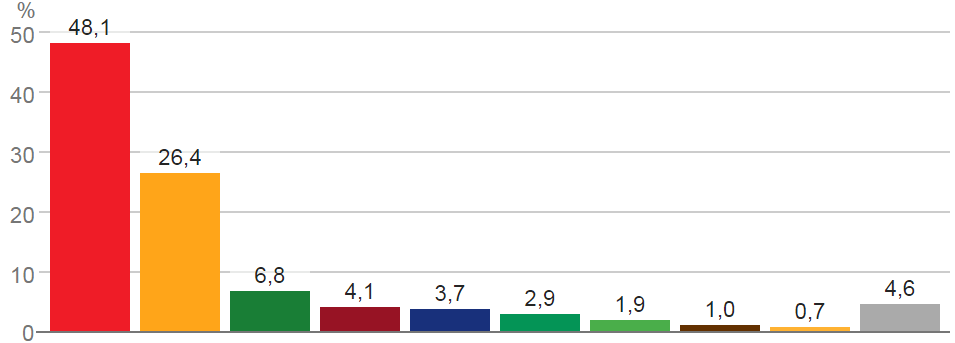
(Spain)	Main: 1982 Spanish general election
← 1979 28 October 1982 1986 →
Party		Votes	%	Seats
	PSOE	10,127,392	48.1%	202
	AP–PDP	5,548,107	26.4%	107
	UCD	1,425,093	6.8%	11
	PCE	846,515	4.0%	4
	CiU	772,726	3.7%	12
	CDS	604,309	2.9%	2
	EAJ/PNV	395,656	1.9%	8
	HB	210,601	1.0%	2
	ERC	138,118	0.7%	1
	Others	962,764	4.6%	1
Total		21,050,038	100.0%	350

This article presents the results breakdown of the election to the Congress of Deputies held in Spain on 28 October 1982. The following tables show detailed results in each of the country's 17 autonomous communities and in the autonomous cities of Ceuta and Melilla, as well as a summary of constituency and regional results. (Note: This territorial division is based on the autonomic system established under the Spanish Constitution of 1978, as opposed to the regional division established in 1833. Most autonomous communities would be constituted by the time of the 1982 election, with the rest being established in early 1983. The autonomous cities of Ceuta and Melilla would not be constituted as independent administrative entities until 1995.)

== Nationwide ==
← Summary of the 28 October 1982 Congress of Deputies election results →
Parties and alliances	Popular vote			Seats	
Parties and alliances	Votes	%	±pp	Total	+/−
Spanish Socialist Workers' Party (PSOE)	10,127,392	48.11	+17.71	202	+81
People's Alliance–People's Democratic Party (AP–PDP)^{1}	5,548,107	26.36	+18.97	107	+91
Union of the Democratic Centre (UCD)^{2}	1,425,093	6.77	−27.14	11	−152
Communist Party of Spain (PCE)	865,272	4.11	−6.66	4	−19
Communist Party of Spain (PCE)	846,515	4.02	−6.75	4	−19
Canarian Assembly–Canarian Coordinator (AC–CC)	18,757	0.09	New	0	±0
Convergence and Union (CiU)	772,726	3.67	+0.98	12	+4
Democratic and Social Centre (CDS)	604,309	2.87	New	2	+2
Basque Nationalist Party (EAJ/PNV)	395,656	1.88	+0.23	8	+1
Popular Unity (HB)	210,601	1.00	+0.04	2	−1
Republican Left of Catalonia (ERC)	138,118	0.66	−0.03	1	±0
New Force (FN)^{3}	108,746	0.52	−1.59	0	−1
Workers' Socialist Party (PST)	103,133	0.49	New	0	±0
Basque Country Left–Left for Socialism (EE)	100,326	0.48	±0.00	1	±0
Socialist Party of Andalusia–Andalusian Party (PSA–PA)	84,474	0.40	−1.41	0	−5
Party of the Communists of Catalonia (PCC)	47,249	0.22	New	0	±0
Galician Nationalist Bloc–Galician Socialist Party (B–PSG)^{4}	38,437	0.18	−0.47	0	±0
Canarian People's Union (UPC)	35,013	0.17	−0.16	0	−1
Left Nationalists (NE)	30,643	0.15	New	0	±0
Spanish Solidarity (SE)	28,451	0.14	New	0	±0
United Extremadura (EU)	26,148	0.12	New	0	±0
Spanish Communist Workers' Party (PCOE)	25,830	0.12	New	0	±0
Canarian Convergence (CC)	25,792	0.12	New	0	±0
Communist Unification of Spain (UCE)	24,044	0.11	−0.16	0	±0
Communist Party of Spain (Marxist–Leninist) (PCE (m–l))	23,186	0.11	New	0	±0
Galician Left (EG)	22,192	0.11	New	0	±0
Valencian People's Union (UPV)^{5}	18,516	0.09	+0.01	0	±0
Communist Unity Candidacy (CUC)^{6}	15,632	0.07	−0.20	0	±0
United Left of the Valencian Country (EUPV)	9,302	0.04	New	0	±0
Falangist Movement of Spain (MFE)	8,976	0.04	+0.04	0	±0
Agrarian Bloc Electoral Group (AEBA)	8,748	0.04	New	0	±0
Socialist Party of Mallorca–Nationalists of the Islands (PSM)	8,633	0.04	−0.02	0	±0
Socialist Party of Aragon (PSAr)^{7}	6,861	0.03	−0.08	0	±0
Valencian Nationalist Left (ENV–URV)^{8}	6,738	0.03	−0.06	0	±0
Communist Left (LCR–MC)^{9}	6,415	0.03	−0.64	0	±0
Socialist Party (PS)^{10}	6,375	0.03	−0.71	0	±0
Independent Galician Electoral Group (AEGI)	5,512	0.03	New	0	±0
Communist League–Internationalist Socialist Workers' Coalition (LC (COSI))	5,462	0.03	+0.01	0	±0
Communist Left Front (FIC)	3,772	0.02	New	0	±0
Canarian Nationalist Party (PNC)	3,257	0.02	New	0	±0
Regionalist Party of the Leonese Country (PREPAL)	3,234	0.02	New	0	±0
Conservatives of Catalonia (CiC)	2,596	0.01	New	0	±0
Spanish Phalanx of the CNSO (FE–JONS)	2,528	0.01	New	0	±0
Liberal Democratic Asturian Party (PADL)	2,493	0.01	New	0	±0
Galician Independents and Migrants (IDG)	2,236	0.01	New	0	±0
Spanish Ruralist Party (PRE)	1,984	0.01	−0.05	0	±0
Independent Spanish Phalanx (FEI)	1,862	0.01	New	0	±0
Nationalist Party of Ceuta (PNCe)	1,785	0.01	New	0	±0
Independent Citizen Group (ACI)	1,710	0.01	New	0	±0
Spanish Catholic Movement (MCE)	1,694	0.01	New	0	±0
Party of El Bierzo (PB)	1,454	0.01	New	0	±0
Canarian Social Democratic Association (ASDC)	1,131	0.01	New	0	±0
Republican Left (IR)	610	0.00	−0.31	0	±0
Asturian Falange (FA)	532	0.00	New	0	±0
Carlist Party (PC)	224	0.00	−0.28	0	±0
Spanish Agrarian Party (PAE)	222	0.00	New	0	±0
Proverist Party (PPr)	168	0.00	−0.03	0	±0
Riojan Left Coordinator (CIR)	0	0.00	New	0	±0
United Canarian People (PCU)	0	0.00	New	0	±0
Majorcan Left (EM)	0	0.00	New	0	±0
Asturian Left Bloc (BIA)	0	0.00	New	0	±0
Blank ballots	98,438	0.47	+0.15		
Total	21,050,038			350	±0
Valid votes	21,050,038	98.05	−0.48		
Invalid votes	419,236	1.95	+0.48		
Votes cast / turnout	21,469,274	79.97	+11.93		
Abstentions	5,377,666	20.03	−11.93		
Registered voters	26,846,940				
Sources
Footnotes: ^{1} People's Alliance–People's Democratic Party results are compared to the combined totals of Democratic Coalition, Navarrese People's Union, Regionalist Aragonese Party and Union of the Democratic Centre in the Basque Country in the 1979 election.; ^{2} Union of the Democratic Centre does not include results in the Basque Country.; ^{3} New Force results are compared to National Union totals in the 1979 election.; ^{4} Galician Nationalist Bloc–Galician Socialist Party results are compared to the combined totals of the Galician National-Popular Bloc and Galician Unity in the 1979 election.; ^{5} Valencian People's Union results are compared to Nationalist Party of the Valencian Country totals in the 1979 election.; ^{6} Communist Unity Candidacy results are compared to Workers' Communist Party totals in the 1979 election.; ^{7} Socialist Party of Aragon results are compared to Coalition for Aragon totals in the 1979 election.; ^{8} Valencian Nationalist Left results are compared to Valencian Regional Union totals in the 1979 election.; ^{9} Communist Left results are compared to the combined totals of Communist Movement–Organization of Communist Left and Revolutionary Communist League in the 1979 election.; ^{10} Socialist Party results are compared to Spanish Socialist Workers' Party (historical) totals in the 1979 election.

== Summary ==
=== Constituencies ===

Summary of constituency results in the 28 October 1982 Congress of Deputies election
Constituency	PSOE		AP–PDP		UCD		PCE		CiU		CDS		PNV		HB		ERC		EE	
Constituency	%	S	%	S	%	S	%	S	%	S	%	S	%	S	%	S	%	S	%	S
Álava	35.3	2	19.1	1			1.1	−			3.8	−	22.0	1	9.9	−			7.0	−
Albacete	53.6	3	28.9	1	8.7	−	4.6	−			2.0	−								
Alicante	54.1	6	29.0	3	7.2	−	4.1	−			2.6	−								
Almería	57.8	4	23.3	1	11.2	−	2.7	−			1.8	−								
Ávila	30.6	1	33.3	1	10.0	−	1.7	−			22.4	1								
Badajoz	57.3	5	23.4	2	8.4	−	4.2	−			1.4	−								
Balearics	40.5	3	37.7	3	10.4	−	1.7	−			5.3	−								
Barcelona	48.2	18	14.4	5	1.5	−	4.9	1	20.9	8	1.9	−					3.7	1		
Biscay	29.6	4	12.0	1			2.2	−			1.5	−	33.4	4	13.1	1			6.6	−
Burgos	37.6	2	42.9	2	9.7	−	1.8	−			4.9	−								
Cáceres	52.5	4	24.5	1	12.6	−	1.6	−			1.9	−								
Cádiz	63.7	6	20.1	2	4.7	−	4.3	−			1.7	−								
Cantabria	45.0	3	38.9	2	5.4	−	3.1	−			5.1	−								
Castellón	49.6	3	28.1	2	12.8	−	3.2	−			2.7	−								
Ceuta	45.5	1	29.9	−	7.3	−	0.7	−			7.8	−								
Ciudad Real	54.0	3	28.2	2	10.5	−	2.7	−			2.0	−								
Córdoba	57.2	5	21.2	2	6.7	−	8.8	−			1.3	−								
Cuenca	44.9	2	31.8	2	15.2	−	3.2	−			1.8	−								
Gerona	34.2	2	13.2	1	2.2	−	3.2	−	36.1	2	2.0	−					5.7	−		
Granada	57.8	5	24.1	2	6.9	−	7.1	−			1.8	−								
Guadalajara	38.2	2	37.7	1	13.4	−	3.8	−			3.3	−								
Guipúzcoa	26.0	2	8.1	−			1.3	−			1.7	−	32.6	3	19.3	1			9.9	1
Huelva	63.4	4	20.8	1	7.8	−	3.6	−			1.4	−								
Huesca	48.4	2	26.0	1	14.7	−	2.5	−			4.9	−								
Jaén	57.1	5	23.0	2	8.9	−	7.4	−			0.9	−								
La Coruña	38.2	4	35.2	4	13.0	1	1.8	−			2.8	−								
La Rioja	43.5	2	41.5	2	7.4	−	1.6	−			3.7	−								
Las Palmas	32.6	3	29.1	2	13.7	1	3.8	−			5.9	−								
León	44.7	3	31.7	2	15.5	1	2.0	−			2.7	−								
Lérida	35.2	2	15.8	1	5.7	−	2.7	−	28.0	1	3.1	−					5.8	−		
Lugo	27.8	1	46.2	3	18.0	1	0.7	−			2.0	−								
Madrid	52.1	18	32.3	11	3.3	1	5.0	1			4.1	1								
Málaga	62.0	6	23.3	2	3.8	−	5.3	−			1.5	−								
Melilla	49.0	1	26.4	−	14.7	−					7.7	−								
Murcia	50.8	5	35.6	3	6.4	−	3.8	−			1.9	−								
Navarre	37.6	3	25.6	2	10.5	−	0.7	−			4.1	−	5.5	−	11.7	−			2.8	−
Orense	28.2	1	35.6	2	29.2	2	0.9	−			1.9	−								
Oviedo	52.1	6	27.9	3	4.9	−	8.1	1			4.3	−								
Palencia	42.9	2	38.8	1	10.6	−	2.3	−			3.9	−								
Pontevedra	30.5	3	37.5	4	18.5	1	1.9	−			2.9	−								
Salamanca	46.0	3	29.7	1	13.7	−	1.2	−			3.8	−								
Santa Cruz de Tenerife	40.9	4	24.5	2	19.3	1	1.9	−			4.0	−								
Segovia	37.1	1	38.3	2	10.5	−	1.5	−			7.5	−								
Seville	62.0	8	22.0	3	3.7	−	7.2	1			0.7	−								
Soria	35.3	1	37.3	1	18.7	1	1.2	−			4.7	−								
Tarragona	42.1	3	17.8	1	4.4	−	4.6	−	20.8	1	2.4	−					4.0	−		
Teruel	41.0	2	33.5	1	16.4	−	1.2	−			4.7	−								
Toledo	47.1	3	33.5	2	9.7	−	4.4	−			1.8	−								
Valencia	53.3	10	29.4	5	4.4	−	5.3	−			2.4	−								
Valladolid	51.3	3	31.3	2	7.4	−	3.4	−			4.2	−								
Zamora	36.1	2	35.9	1	18.7	1	1.0	−			4.4	−								
Zaragoza	51.3	5	31.5	3	6.8	−	3.3	−			4.0	−								
Total	48.1	202	26.4	107	6.8	11	4.1	4	3.7	12	2.9	2	1.9	8	1.0	2	0.7	1	0.5	1

=== Regions ===

Summary of regional results in the 28 October 1982 Congress of Deputies election
Region	PSOE		AP–PDP		UCD		PCE		CiU		CDS		PNV		HB		ERC		EE	
Region	%	S	%	S	%	S	%	S	%	S	%	S	%	S	%	S	%	S	%	S
Andalusia	60.5	43	22.2	15	5.9	−	6.2	1			1.3	−								
Aragon	49.4	9	30.8	5	9.5	−	2.9	−			4.3	−								
Asturias	52.1	6	27.9	3	4.9	−	8.1	1			4.3	−								
Balearics	40.5	3	37.7	3	10.4	−	1.7	−			5.3	−								
Basque Country	29.2	8	11.6	2			1.8	−			1.8	−	31.7	8	14.7	2			7.7	1
Canary Islands	36.7	7	26.9	4	16.4	2	2.9	−			4.9	−								
Cantabria	45.0	3	38.9	2	5.4	−	3.1	−			5.1	−								
Castile and León	42.4	18	34.6	13	12.3	3	2.0	−			5.5	1								
Castilla–La Mancha	49.2	13	31.2	8	10.8	−	3.7	−			2.0	−								
Catalonia	45.8	25	14.7	8	2.0	−	4.6	1	22.5	12	2.0	−					4.0	1		
Ceuta	45.5	1	29.9	−	7.3	−	0.7	−			7.8	−								
Extremadura	55.4	9	23.8	3	10.1	−	3.2	−			1.6	−								
Galicia	32.8	9	37.6	13	17.7	5	1.5	−			2.6	−								
La Rioja	43.5	2	41.5	2	7.4	−	1.6	−			3.7	−								
Madrid	52.1	18	32.3	11	3.3	1	5.0	1			4.1	1								
Melilla	49.0	1	26.4	−	14.7	−					7.7	−								
Murcia	50.8	5	35.6	3	6.4	−	3.8	−			1.9	−								
Navarre	37.6	3	25.6	2	10.5	−	0.7	−			4.1	−	5.5	−	11.7	−			2.8	−
Valencian Community	53.1	19	29.1	10	6.3	−	4.6	−			2.5	−								
Total	48.1	202	26.4	107	6.8	11	4.1	4	3.7	12	2.9	2	1.9	8	1.0	2	0.7	1	0.5	1

== Autonomous communities ==
=== Andalusia ===
← Summary of the 28 October 1982 Congress of Deputies election results in Andalusia →
Parties and alliances	Popular vote			Seats	
Parties and alliances	Votes	%	±pp	Total	+/−
Spanish Socialist Workers' Party of Andalusia (PSA–PSOE)	2,064,865	60.45	+26.92	43	+20
People's Alliance–People's Democratic Party (AP–PDP)^{1}	757,182	22.17	+17.89	15	+15
Communist Party of Andalusia (PCA–PCE)	211,456	6.19	−7.14	1	−6
Union of the Democratic Centre (UCD)	201,402	5.90	−25.89	0	−24
Socialist Party of Andalusia–Andalusian Party (PSA–PA)	77,068	2.26	−8.81	0	−5
Democratic and Social Centre (CDS)	44,551	1.30	New	0	±0
Workers' Socialist Party (PST)	12,146	0.36	New	0	±0
New Force (FN)^{2}	12,055	0.35	−1.29	0	±0
Spanish Communist Workers' Party (PCOE)	6,059	0.18	New	0	±0
Spanish Solidarity (SE)	4,313	0.13	New	0	±0
Communist Unification of Spain (UCE)	2,534	0.07	−0.03	0	±0
Communist Unity Candidacy (CUC)^{3}	2,490	0.07	−0.12	0	±0
Communist Party of Spain (Marxist–Leninist) (PCE (m–l))	2,096	0.06	New	0	±0
Falangist Movement of Spain (MFE)	2,016	0.06	New	0	±0
Communist League–Internationalist Socialist Workers' Coalition (LC (COSI))	919	0.03	New	0	±0
Independent Spanish Phalanx (FEI)	341	0.01	New	0	±0
Spanish Agrarian Party (PAE)	222	0.01	New	0	±0
Communist Movement of Andalusia (MCA)	66	0.00	−0.25	0	±0
Spanish Phalanx of the CNSO (FE–JONS)	22	0.00	New	0	±0
Revolutionary Communist League (LCR)	20	0.00	−0.09	0	±0
Socialist Party (PS)^{4}	0	0.00	−0.63	0	±0
Blank ballots	13,996	0.41	+0.24		
Total	3,415,819			59	±0
Valid votes	3,415,819	98.56	−0.30		
Invalid votes	49,863	1.44	+0.30		
Votes cast / turnout	3,465,682	78.75	+10.10		
Abstentions	934,922	21.25	−10.10		
Registered voters	4,400,604				
Sources
Footnotes: ^{1} People's Alliance–People's Democratic Party results are compared to Democratic Coalition totals in the 1979 election.; ^{2} New Force results are compared to National Union totals in the 1979 election.; ^{3} Communist Unity Candidacy results are compared to Workers' Communist Party totals in the 1979 election.; ^{4} Socialist Party results are compared to Spanish Socialist Workers' Party (historical) totals in the 1979 election.

=== Aragon ===
← Summary of the 28 October 1982 Congress of Deputies election results in Aragon →
Parties and alliances	Popular vote			Seats	
Parties and alliances	Votes	%	±pp	Total	+/−
Spanish Socialist Workers' Party (PSOE)	357,339	49.41	+21.11	9	+4
People's Alliance–People's Democratic–Aragonese Party (AP–PDP–PAR)^{1}	222,524	30.77	+19.08	5	+4
Union of the Democratic Centre (UCD)	68,848	9.52	−31.43	0	−8
Democratic and Social Centre (CDS)	30,765	4.25	New	0	±0
Communist Party of Aragon (PCA–PCE)	20,930	2.89	−4.20	0	±0
Socialist Party of Aragon (PSAr)^{2}	6,861	0.95	−2.12	0	±0
New Force (FN)^{3}	4,036	0.56	−1.15	0	±0
Workers' Socialist Party (PST)	3,975	0.55	New	0	±0
Communist Unification of Spain (UCE)	945	0.13	New	0	±0
Communist Party of Spain (Marxist–Leninist) (PCE (m–l))	836	0.12	New	0	±0
Spanish Solidarity (SE)	667	0.09	New	0	±0
Communist Unity Candidacy (CUC)^{4}	665	0.09	−0.19	0	±0
Falangist Movement of Spain (MFE)	99	0.01	New	0	±0
Communist League–Internationalist Socialist Workers' Coalition (LC (COSI))	47	0.01	New	0	±0
Communist Left (LCR–MC)^{5}	0	0.00	−0.75	0	±0
Spanish Phalanx of the CNSO (FE–JONS)	0	0.00	New	0	±0
Blank ballots	4,730	0.65	+0.24		
Total	723,267			14	±0
Valid votes	723,267	97.01	−1.46		
Invalid votes	22,295	2.99	+1.46		
Votes cast / turnout	745,562	82.42	+11.67		
Abstentions	159,020	17.58	−11.67		
Registered voters	904,582				
Sources
Footnotes: ^{1} People's Alliance–People's Democratic–Aragonese Party results are compared to the combined totals of Democratic Coalition and Regionalist Aragonese Party in the 1979 election.; ^{2} Socialist Party of Aragon results are compared to Coalition for Aragon totals in the 1979 election.; ^{3} New Force results are compared to National Union totals in the 1979 election.; ^{4} Communist Unity Candidacy results are compared to Workers' Communist Party totals in the 1979 election.; ^{5} Communist Left results are compared to the combined totals of Communist Movement–Organization of Communist Left and Revolutionary Communist League in the 1979 election.

=== Asturias ===
← Summary of the 28 October 1982 Congress of Deputies election results in Asturias →
Parties and alliances	Popular vote			Seats	
Parties and alliances	Votes	%	±pp	Total	+/−
Spanish Socialist Workers' Party (PSOE)	339,575	52.13	+14.85	6	+2
People's Alliance–People's Democratic Party (AP–PDP)^{1}	181,965	27.94	+19.31	3	+2
Communist Party of Spain (PCE)	53,017	8.14	−5.58	1	±0
Union of the Democratic Centre (UCD)	31,763	4.88	−28.14	0	−4
Democratic and Social Centre (CDS)	28,048	4.31	New	0	±0
Workers' Socialist Party (PST)	3,570	0.55	New	0	±0
Liberal Democratic Asturian Party (PADL)	2,493	0.38	New	0	±0
New Force (FN)^{2}	2,056	0.32	−1.76	0	±0
Spanish Communist Workers' Party (PCOE)	1,713	0.26	New	0	±0
Communist Unity Candidacy (CUC)^{3}	1,223	0.19	−0.39	0	±0
Spanish Solidarity (SE)	897	0.14	New	0	±0
Communist Unification of Spain (UCE)	712	0.11	−0.10	0	±0
Communist Party of Spain (Marxist–Leninist) (PCE (m–l))	567	0.09	New	0	±0
Asturian Falange (FA)	532	0.08	New	0	±0
Communist League–Internationalist Socialist Workers' Coalition (LC (COSI))	448	0.07	New	0	±0
Asturian Left Bloc (BIA)	0	0.00	New	0	±0
Spanish Phalanx of the CNSO (FE–JONS)	0	0.00	New	0	±0
Socialist Party (PS)^{4}	0	0.00	−0.58	0	±0
Blank ballots	2,799	0.43	+0.21		
Total	651,378			10	±0
Valid votes	651,378	98.29	−0.28		
Invalid votes	11,332	1.71	+0.28		
Votes cast / turnout	662,710	77.60	+14.86		
Abstentions	191,271	22.40	−14.86		
Registered voters	853,981				
Sources
Footnotes: ^{1} People's Alliance–People's Democratic Party results are compared to Democratic Coalition totals in the 1979 election.; ^{2} New Force results are compared to National Union totals in the 1979 election.; ^{3} Communist Unity Candidacy results are compared to Workers' Communist Party totals in the 1979 election.; ^{4} Socialist Party results are compared to Spanish Socialist Workers' Party (historical) totals in the 1979 election.

=== Balearics ===
← Summary of the 28 October 1982 Congress of Deputies election results in the Balearics →
Parties and alliances	Popular vote			Seats	
Parties and alliances	Votes	%	±pp	Total	+/−
Spanish Socialist Workers' Party (PSOE)	144,232	40.45	+11.07	3	+1
People's Alliance–People's Democratic Party (AP–PDP)^{1}	134,444	37.71	+28.54	3	+3
Union of the Democratic Centre (UCD)	37,148	10.42	−38.50	0	−4
Democratic and Social Centre (CDS)	18,722	5.25	New	0	±0
Socialist Party of Mallorca–Nationalists of the Islands (PSM)	8,633	2.42	−0.92	0	±0
Communist Party of Spain (PCE)	5,962	1.67	−3.24	0	±0
Workers' Socialist Party (PST)	1,716	0.48	New	0	±0
Spanish Communist Workers' Party (PCOE)	1,178	0.33	New	0	±0
New Force (FN)^{2}	879	0.25	−0.80	0	±0
Communist Unification of Spain (UCE)	518	0.15	New	0	±0
Spanish Solidarity (SE)	509	0.14	New	0	±0
Communist Party of Spain (Marxist–Leninist) (PCE (m–l))	450	0.13	New	0	±0
Majorcan Left (EM)	0	0.00	New	0	±0
Revolutionary Communist League (LCR)	0	0.00	−0.30	0	±0
Spanish Phalanx of the CNSO (FE–JONS)	0	0.00	New	0	±0
Blank ballots	2,148	0.60	+0.22		
Total	356,539			6	±0
Valid votes	356,539	95.76	+0.37		
Invalid votes	15,791	4.24	−0.37		
Votes cast / turnout	372,330	79.74	+10.09		
Abstentions	94,579	20.26	−10.09		
Registered voters	466,909				
Sources
Footnotes: ^{1} People's Alliance–People's Democratic Party results are compared to Democratic Coalition totals in the 1979 election.; ^{2} New Force results are compared to National Union totals in the 1979 election.

=== Basque Country ===
← Summary of the 28 October 1982 Congress of Deputies election results in the Basque Country →
Parties and alliances	Popular vote			Seats	
Parties and alliances	Votes	%	±pp	Total	+/−
Basque Nationalist Party (EAJ/PNV)	379,293	31.73	+4.16	8	+1
Socialist Party of the Basque Country (PSE–PSOE)	348,620	29.16	+10.11	8	+3
Popular Unity (HB)	175,857	14.71	−0.28	2	−1
Democratic Coalition (AP–PDP–PDL–UCD)^{1}	139,148	11.64	−8.66	2	−3
Basque Country Left–Left for Socialism (EE)	91,927	7.69	−0.33	1	±0
Democratic and Social Centre (CDS)	21,826	1.83	New	0	±0
Communist Party of the Basque Country (PCE/EPK)	20,954	1.75	−2.84	0	±0
Workers' Socialist Party (PST)	5,811	0.49	New	0	±0
New Force (FN)^{2}	2,038	0.17	−0.93	0	±0
Communist Unification of Spain (UCE)	1,622	0.14	New	0	±0
Communist Unity Candidacy (CUC)^{3}	1,290	0.11	+0.11	0	±0
Communist Party of Spain (Marxist–Leninist) (PCE (m–l))	897	0.08	New	0	±0
Communist League–Internationalist Socialist Workers' Coalition (LC (COSI))	183	0.02	New	0	±0
Spanish Solidarity (SE)	132	0.01	New	0	±0
Communist Movement of the Basque Country (EMK)	63	0.01	−1.32	0	±0
Revolutionary Communist League (LKI)	11	0.00	−0.56	0	±0
Socialist Party (PS)^{4}	0	0.00	−0.48	0	±0
Blank ballots	5,809	0.49	+0.25		
Total	1,195,481			21	±0
Valid votes	1,195,481	97.96	+0.11		
Invalid votes	24,888	2.04	−0.11		
Votes cast / turnout	1,220,369	79.34	+13.39		
Abstentions	317,764	20.66	−13.39		
Registered voters	1,538,133				
Sources
Footnotes: ^{1} AP–PDP–PDL–UCD results are compared to the combined totals of Foral Union of the Basque Country and Union of the Democratic Centre in the 1979 election.; ^{2} New Force results are compared to National Union totals in the 1979 election.; ^{3} Communist Unity Candidacy results are compared to Workers' Communist Party totals in the 1979 election.; ^{4} Socialist Party results are compared to Spanish Socialist Workers' Party (historical) totals in the 1979 election.

=== Canary Islands ===
← Summary of the 28 October 1982 Congress of Deputies election results in the Canary Islands →
Parties and alliances	Popular vote			Seats	
Parties and alliances	Votes	%	±pp	Total	+/−
Spanish Socialist Workers' Party (PSOE)	239,615	36.65	+18.83	7	+4
People's Alliance–People's Democratic Party (AP–PDP)^{1}	175,875	26.90	+23.19	4	+4
Union of the Democratic Centre (UCD)	107,341	16.42	−41.94	2	−7
Canarian People's Union (UPC)	35,013	5.36	−5.68	0	−1
Democratic and Social Centre (CDS)	32,292	4.94	New	0	±0
Canarian Convergence (CC)	25,792	3.95	New	0	±0
Canarian Assembly–Canarian Coordinator (AC–CC)	18,757	2.87	New	0	±0
Workers' Socialist Party (PST)	5,215	0.80	New	0	±0
Canarian Nationalist Party (PNC)	3,257	0.50	New	0	±0
New Force (FN)^{2}	2,073	0.32	−0.75	0	±0
Communist Party of Spain (Marxist–Leninist) (PCE (m-l))	1,424	0.22	New	0	±0
Canarian Social Democratic Association (ASDC)	1,131	0.17	New	0	±0
Communist League–Internationalist Socialist Workers' Coalition (LC (COSI))	1,049	0.16	New	0	±0
Communist Unification of Spain (UCE)	687	0.11	New	0	±0
Spanish Solidarity (SE)	574	0.09	New	0	±0
Revolutionary Communist League (LCR)	443	0.07	−0.28	0	±0
Socialist Party (PS)	0	0.00	New	0	±0
United Canarian People (PCU)	0	0.00	New	0	±0
Blank ballots	3,194	0.49	+0.17		
Total	653,732			13	±0
Valid votes	653,732	97.11	−0.42		
Invalid votes	19,475	2.89	+0.42		
Votes cast / turnout	673,207	76.00	+14.86		
Abstentions	212,643	24.00	−14.86		
Registered voters	885,850				
Sources
Footnotes: ^{1} People's Alliance–People's Democratic Party results are compared to Democratic Coalition totals in the 1979 election.; ^{2} New Force results are compared to National Union totals in the 1979 election.

=== Cantabria ===
← Summary of the 28 October 1982 Congress of Deputies election results in Cantabria →
Parties and alliances	Popular vote			Seats	
Parties and alliances	Votes	%	±pp	Total	+/−
Spanish Socialist Workers' Party (PSOE)	135,987	45.00	+14.72	3	+1
People's Alliance–People's Democratic Party (AP–PDP)^{1}	117,567	38.91	+28.61	2	+2
Union of the Democratic Centre (UCD)	16,265	5.38	−36.48	0	−3
Democratic and Social Centre (CDS)	15,281	5.06	New	0	±0
Communist Party of Spain (PCE)	9,265	3.07	−3.54	0	±0
Workers' Socialist Party (PST)	1,760	0.58	New	0	±0
New Force (FN)^{2}	1,716	0.57	−3.33	0	±0
Falangist Mountain Unity–Falangist Movement of Spain (UFM–MFE)	827	0.27	+0.02	0	±0
Spanish Solidarity (SE)	642	0.21	New	0	±0
Communist Unification of Spain (UCE)	421	0.14	New	0	±0
Communist Unity Candidacy (CUC)	404	0.13	New	0	±0
Communist League–Internationalist Socialist Workers' Coalition (LC (COSI))	262	0.09	New	0	±0
Socialist Party (PS)^{3}	0	0.00	−1.44	0	±0
Revolutionary Communist League (LCR)	0	0.00	−0.29	0	±0
Spanish Phalanx of the CNSO (FE–JONS)	0	0.00	New	0	±0
Blank ballots	1,768	0.59	+0.14		
Total	302,165			5	±0
Valid votes	302,165	97.03	−0.95		
Invalid votes	9,250	2.97	+0.95		
Votes cast / turnout	311,415	82.67	+12.22		
Abstentions	65,297	17.33	−12.22		
Registered voters	376,712				
Sources
Footnotes: ^{1} People's Alliance–People's Democratic Party results are compared to Right Independent Group totals in the 1979 election.; ^{2} New Force results are compared to National Union totals in the 1979 election.; ^{3} Socialist Party results are compared to Spanish Socialist Workers' Party (historical) totals in the 1979 election.

=== Castile and León ===
← Summary of the 28 October 1982 Congress of Deputies election results in Castile and León →
Parties and alliances	Popular vote			Seats	
Parties and alliances	Votes	%	±pp	Total	+/−
Spanish Socialist Workers' Party (PSOE)	645,491	42.38	+16.76	18	+8
People's Alliance–People's Democratic Party (AP–PDP)^{1}	526,469	34.56	+25.16	13	+13
Union of the Democratic Centre (UCD)	186,840	12.27	−38.71	3	−22
Democratic and Social Centre (CDS)	83,824	5.50	New	1	+1
Communist Party of Spain (PCE)	29,888	1.96	−2.90	0	±0
Agrarian Bloc Electoral Group (AEBA)	8,748	0.57	New	0	±0
New Force (FN)^{2}	7,556	0.50	−1.73	0	±0
Workers' Socialist Party (PST)	7,219	0.47	New	0	±0
Regionalist Party of the Leonese Country (PREPAL)	3,234	0.21	New	0	±0
Communist Unification of Spain (UCE)	3,061	0.20	New	0	±0
Spanish Ruralist Party (PRE)	1,984	0.13	−0.64	0	±0
Communist Party of Spain (Marxist–Leninist) (PCE (m–l))	1,740	0.11	New	0	±0
Party of El Bierzo (PB)	1,454	0.10	New	0	±0
Communist Unity Candidacy (CUC)^{3}	1,433	0.09	−0.19	0	±0
Spanish Solidarity (SE)	1,202	0.08	New	0	±0
Falangist Movement of Spain (MFE)	650	0.04	New	0	±0
Communist League–Internationalist Socialist Workers' Coalition (LC (COSI))	435	0.03	+0.03	0	±0
Revolutionary Communist League (LCR)	239	0.02	−0.19	0	±0
Communist Movement of Castile and León (MC–CL)	75	0.00	−0.46	0	±0
Spanish Phalanx of the CNSO (FE–JONS)	46	0.00	New	0	±0
Socialist Party (PS)^{4}	0	0.00	−0.57	0	±0
Blank ballots	11,606	0.76	+0.17		
Total	1,523,194			35	±0
Valid votes	1,523,194	97.21	−1.30		
Invalid votes	43,637	2.79	+1.30		
Votes cast / turnout	1,566,831	80.66	+11.08		
Abstentions	375,564	19.34	−11.08		
Registered voters	1,942,395				
Sources
Footnotes: ^{1} People's Alliance–People's Democratic Party results are compared to Democratic Coalition totals in the 1979 election.; ^{2} New Force results are compared to National Union totals in the 1979 election.; ^{3} Communist Unity Candidacy results are compared to Workers' Communist Party totals in the 1979 election.; ^{4} Socialist Party results are compared to Spanish Socialist Workers' Party (historical) totals in the 1979 election.

=== Castilla–La Mancha ===
← Summary of the 28 October 1982 Congress of Deputies election results in Castilla–La Mancha →
Parties and alliances	Popular vote			Seats	
Parties and alliances	Votes	%	±pp	Total	+/−
Spanish Socialist Workers' Party (PSOE)	486,553	49.21	+14.67	13	+5
People's Alliance–People's Democratic Party (AP–PDP)^{1}	308,969	31.25	+25.49	8	+8
Union of the Democratic Centre (UCD)	106,799	10.80	−32.22	0	−13
Communist Party of Spain (PCE)	36,999	3.74	−6.03	0	±0
Democratic and Social Centre (CDS)	20,038	2.03	New	0	±0
New Force (FN)^{2}	14,771	1.49	−2.86	0	±0
Workers' Socialist Party (PST)	4,067	0.41	New	0	±0
Spanish Solidarity (SE)	1,437	0.15	New	0	±0
Spanish Phalanx of the CNSO (FE–JONS)	1,414	0.14	New	0	±0
Spanish Communist Workers' Party (PCOE)	961	0.10	New	0	±0
Communist Unification of Spain (UCE)	708	0.07	New	0	±0
Falangist Movement of Spain (MFE)	539	0.05	New	0	±0
Communist Party of Spain (Marxist–Leninist) (PCE (m–l))	409	0.04	New	0	±0
Communist Unity Candidacy (CUC)^{3}	350	0.04	±0.00	0	±0
Communist League–Internationalist Socialist Workers' Coalition (LC (COSI))	248	0.03	New	0	±0
Revolutionary Communist League (LCR)	154	0.02	±0.00	0	±0
Communist Movement (MC)	0	0.00	−0.03	0	±0
Socialist Party (PS)^{4}	0	0.00	−0.53	0	±0
Blank ballots	4,330	0.44	+0.20		
Total	988,746			21	±0
Valid votes	988,746	97.99	−0.94		
Invalid votes	20,258	2.01	+0.94		
Votes cast / turnout	1,009,004	84.11	+11.33		
Abstentions	190,671	15.89	−11.33		
Registered voters	1,199,675				
Sources
Footnotes: ^{1} People's Alliance–People's Democratic Party results are compared to Democratic Coalition totals in the 1979 election.; ^{2} New Force results are compared to National Union totals in the 1979 election.; ^{3} Communist Unity Candidacy results are compared to Workers' Communist Party totals in the 1979 election.; ^{4} Socialist Party results are compared to Spanish Socialist Workers' Party (historical) totals in the 1979 election.

=== Catalonia ===
← Summary of the 28 October 1982 Congress of Deputies election results in Catalonia →
Parties and alliances	Popular vote			Seats	
Parties and alliances	Votes	%	±pp	Total	+/−
Socialists' Party of Catalonia (PSC–PSOE)	1,575,601	45.83	+16.16	25	+8
Convergence and Union (CiU)	772,726	22.48	+6.10	12	+4
People's Alliance–People's Democratic Party (AP–PDP)^{1}	504,075	14.66	+11.01	8	+7
Unified Socialist Party of Catalonia (PSUC–PCE)	158,553	4.61	−12.77	1	−7
Republican Left of Catalonia (ERC)	138,118	4.02	−0.16	1	±0
Centrists of Catalonia (CC–UCD)	70,235	2.04	−17.31	0	−12
Democratic and Social Centre (CDS)	68,395	1.99	New	0	±0
Party of the Communists of Catalonia (PCC)	47,249	1.37	New	0	±0
Left Nationalists (NE)	30,643	0.89	New	0	±0
Workers' Socialist Party (PST)	20,110	0.58	New	0	±0
New Force (FN)^{2}	12,125	0.35	−0.58	0	±0
Socialist Party of Andalusia–Andalusian Party (PSA–PA)	7,406	0.22	New	0	±0
Communist Front of Catalonia (FCC)^{3}	4,900	0.14	−0.10	0	±0
Communist Workers' Party of Catalonia (PCOC)	3,143	0.09	New	0	±0
Communist Party of Spain (Marxist–Leninist) (PCE (m–l))	2,751	0.08	New	0	±0
Spanish Solidarity (SE)	2,702	0.08	New	0	±0
Conservatives of Catalonia (CiC)	2,596	0.08	New	0	±0
Communist Unification of Spain (UCE)	2,318	0.07	−0.15	0	±0
Falangist Movement of Spain (MFE)	171	0.00	New	0	±0
Communist League–Internationalist Socialist Workers' Coalition (LC (COSI))	161	0.00	±0.00	0	±0
Spanish Phalanx of the CNSO (FE–JONS)	0	0.00	New	0	±0
Socialist Party (PS)^{4}	0	0.00	−1.01	0	±0
Blank ballots	13,728	0.40	±0.00		
Total	3,437,706			47	±0
Valid votes	3,437,706	98.66	+0.42		
Invalid votes	46,821	1.34	−0.42		
Votes cast / turnout	3,484,527	80.83	+13.21		
Abstentions	826,342	19.17	−13.21		
Registered voters	4,310,869				
Sources
Footnotes: ^{1} People's Alliance–People's Democratic Party results are compared to Democratic Coalition totals in the 1979 election.; ^{2} New Force results are compared to National Union totals in the 1979 election.; ^{3} Communist Front of Catalonia results are compared to Revolutionary Communist League totals in the 1979 election.; ^{4} Socialist Party results are compared to Spanish Socialist Workers' Party (historical) totals in the 1979 election.

=== Extremadura ===
← Summary of the 28 October 1982 Congress of Deputies election results in Extremadura →
Parties and alliances	Popular vote			Seats	
Parties and alliances	Votes	%	±pp	Total	+/−
Spanish Socialist Workers' Party (PSOE)	333,046	55.41	+17.84	9	+4
People's Alliance–People's Democratic Party (AP–PDP)^{1}	143,032	23.80	+20.13	3	+3
Union of the Democratic Centre (UCD)	60,479	10.06	−35.53	0	−7
United Extremadura (EU)	26,148	4.35	New	0	±0
Communist Party of Spain (PCE)	19,199	3.19	−4.58	0	±0
Democratic and Social Centre (CDS)	9,816	1.63	New	0	±0
Workers' Socialist Party (PST)	2,905	0.48	New	0	±0
New Force (FN)^{2}	1,680	0.28	−1.94	0	±0
Communist Unity Candidacy (CUC)	869	0.14	New	0	±0
Spanish Solidarity (SE)	683	0.11	New	0	±0
Communist Unification of Spain (UCE)	488	0.08	New	0	±0
Falangist Movement of Spain (MFE)	212	0.04	New	0	±0
Proverist Party (PPr)	168	0.03	New	0	±0
Spanish Phalanx of the CNSO (FE–JONS)	44	0.01	New	0	±0
Communist Movement of Extremadura (MCE)	2	0.00	−0.25	0	±0
Revolutionary Communist League (LCR)	0	0.00	New	0	±0
Socialist Party (PS)^{3}	0	0.00	−0.59	0	±0
Blank ballots	2,294	0.38	+0.19		
Total	601,065			12	±0
Valid votes	601,065	98.15	−0.75		
Invalid votes	11,356	1.85	+0.75		
Votes cast / turnout	612,421	79.98	+9.90		
Abstentions	153,307	20.02	−9.90		
Registered voters	765,728				
Sources
Footnotes: ^{1} People's Alliance–People's Democratic Party results are compared to Democratic Coalition totals in the 1979 election.; ^{2} New Force results are compared to National Union totals in the 1979 election.; ^{3} Socialist Party results are compared to Spanish Socialist Workers' Party (historical) totals in the 1979 election.

=== Galicia ===
← Summary of the 28 October 1982 Congress of Deputies election results in Galicia →
Parties and alliances	Popular vote			Seats	
Parties and alliances	Votes	%	±pp	Total	+/−
People's Alliance–People's Democratic Party (AP–PDP)^{1}	488,438	37.60	+23.41	13	+9
Socialists' Party of Galicia (PSdG–PSOE)	426,469	32.83	+15.51	9	+3
Union of the Democratic Centre (UCD)	230,113	17.71	−30.47	5	−12
Galician Nationalist Bloc–Galician Socialist Party (B–PSG)^{2}	38,437	2.96	−2.99	0	±0
Democratic and Social Centre (CDS)	33,588	2.59	New	0	±0
Galician Left (EG)	22,192	1.71	New	0	±0
Communist Party of Galicia (PCE–PCG)	20,108	1.55	−2.61	0	±0
Workers' Socialist Party (PST)	12,481	0.96	New	0	±0
Independent Galician Electoral Group (AEGI)	5,512	0.42	New	0	±0
New Force (FN)^{3}	2,545	0.20	−0.57	0	±0
Spanish Solidarity (SE)	2,403	0.18	New	0	±0
Communist Unification of Spain (UCE)	2,402	0.18	New	0	±0
Galician Independents and Migrants (IDG)	2,236	0.17	New	0	±0
Communist Party of Spain (Marxist–Leninist) (PCE (m–l))	1,841	0.14	New	0	±0
Spanish Communist Workers' Party (PCOE)	1,653	0.13	New	0	±0
Spanish Phalanx of the CNSO (FE–JONS)	910	0.07	New	0	±0
Communist Unity Candidacy (CUC)^{4}	704	0.05	−0.17	0	±0
Communist Left (LCR–MC)^{5}	425	0.03	−0.71	0	±0
Blank ballots	6,553	0.50	+0.33		
Total	1,299,010			27	±0
Valid votes	1,299,010	98.33	−0.12		
Invalid votes	22,050	1.67	+0.12		
Votes cast / turnout	1,321,060	63.70	+14.50		
Abstentions	752,922	36.30	−14.50		
Registered voters	2,073,982				
Sources
Footnotes: ^{1} People's Alliance–People's Democratic Party results are compared to Democratic Coalition totals in the 1979 election.; ^{2} Galician Nationalist Bloc–Galician Socialist Party results are compared to the combined totals of the Galician National-Popular Bloc and Galician Unity in the 1979 election.; ^{3} New Force results are compared to National Union totals in the 1979 election.; ^{4} Communist Unity Candidacy results are compared to Workers' Communist Party totals in the 1979 election.; ^{5} Communist Left results are compared to the combined totals of Communist Movement of Galicia–Organization of Communist Left and Revolutionary Communist League in the 1979 election.

=== La Rioja ===
← Summary of the 28 October 1982 Congress of Deputies election results in La Rioja →
Parties and alliances	Popular vote			Seats	
Parties and alliances	Votes	%	±pp	Total	+/−
Spanish Socialist Workers' Party (PSOE)	67,781	43.45	+14.32	2	+1
People's Alliance–People's Democratic Party (AP–PDP)^{1}	64,778	41.53	+27.66	2	+2
Union of the Democratic Centre (UCD)	11,545	7.40	−40.64	0	−3
Democratic and Social Centre (CDS)	5,774	3.70	New	0	±0
Communist Party of Spain (PCE)	2,491	1.60	−1.97	0	±0
Workers' Socialist Party (PST)	902	0.58	New	0	±0
New Force (FN)^{2}	669	0.43	−0.73	0	±0
Communist Unification of Spain (UCE)	445	0.29	New	0	±
Carlist Party (PC)	224	0.14	−0.29	0	±0
Communist Unity Candidacy (CUC)	184	0.12	New	0	±0
Communist Party of Spain (Marxist–Leninist) (PCE (m–l))	116	0.07	New	0	±0
Riojan Left Coordinator (CIR)	0	0.00	New	0	±0
Blank ballots	1,086	0.70	+0.12		
Total	155,995	100.00		4	±0
Valid votes	155,995	97.52	−1.25		
Invalid votes	3,971	2.48	+1.25		
Votes cast / turnout	159,966	84.10	+10.79		
Abstentions	30,238	15.90	−10.79		
Registered voters	190,204				
Sources
Footnotes: ^{1} People's Alliance–People's Democratic Party results are compared to Democratic Coalition totals in the 1979 election.; ^{2} New Force results are compared to National Union totals in the 1979 election.

=== Madrid ===
← Summary of the 28 October 1982 Congress of Deputies election results in Madrid →
Parties and alliances	Popular vote			Seats	
Parties and alliances	Votes	%	±pp	Total	+/−
Spanish Socialist Workers' Party (PSOE)	1,439,137	52.09	+18.75	18	+6
People's Alliance–People's Democratic Party (AP–PDP)^{1}	891,372	32.26	+23.66	11	+8
Communist Party of Spain (PCE)	137,459	4.98	−8.48	1	−3
Democratic and Social Centre (CDS)	113,384	4.10	New	1	+1
Union of the Democratic Centre (UCD)	92,508	3.35	−29.79	1	−11
New Force (FN)^{2}	22,602	0.82	−3.98	0	−1
Spanish Solidarity (SE)	10,017	0.36	New	0	±0
Workers' Socialist Party (PST)	8,064	0.29	New	0	±0
Communist Party of Spain (Marxist–Leninist) (PCE (m–l))	7,532	0.27	New	0	±0
Socialist Party (PS)^{3}	6,375	0.23	−0.35	0	±0
Spanish Communist Workers' Party (PCOE)	5,210	0.19	New	0	±0
Communist Unification of Spain (UCE)	3,900	0.14	−0.15	0	±0
Communist Left Front (FIC)	3,772	0.14	New	0	±0
Communist Unity Candidacy (CUC)^{4}	3,188	0.12	−0.08	0	±0
Falangist Movement of Spain (MFE)	2,187	0.08	New	0	±0
Independent Citizen Group (ACI)	1,710	0.06	New	0	±0
Spanish Catholic Movement (MCE)	1,694	0.06	New	0	±0
Communist League–Internationalist Socialist Workers' Coalition (LC (COSI))	634	0.02	−0.10	0	±0
Spanish Phalanx of the CNSO (FE–JONS)	92	0.00	New	0	±0
Blank ballots	11,826	0.43	+0.05		
Total	2,762,663			32	±0
Valid votes	2,762,663	98.13	−0.99		
Invalid votes	52,635	1.87	+0.99		
Votes cast / turnout	2,815,298	85.96	+12.69		
Abstentions	459,668	14.04	−12.69		
Registered voters	3,274,966				
Sources
Footnotes: ^{1} People's Alliance–People's Democratic Party results are compared to Democratic Coalition totals in the 1979 election.; ^{2} New Force results are compared to National Union totals in the 1979 election.; ^{3} Socialist Party results are compared to Spanish Socialist Workers' Party (historical) totals in the 1979 election.; ^{4} Communist Unity Candidacy results are compared to Workers' Communist Party totals in the 1979 election.

=== Murcia ===
← Summary of the 28 October 1982 Congress of Deputies election results in Murcia →
Parties and alliances	Popular vote			Seats	
Parties and alliances	Votes	%	±pp	Total	+/−
Spanish Socialist Workers' Party (PSOE)	270,552	50.76	+11.61	5	+1
People's Alliance–People's Democratic Party (AP–PDP)^{1}	189,642	35.58	+29.90	3	+3
Union of the Democratic Centre (UCD)	34,354	6.45	−32.62	0	−4
Communist Party of Spain (PCE)	20,065	3.76	−4.15	0	±0
Democratic and Social Centre (CDS)	10,211	1.92	New	0	±0
New Force (FN)^{2}	2,501	0.47	−1.05	0	±0
Spanish Communist Workers' Party (PCOE)	1,007	0.19	New	0	±0
Communist Unification of Spain (UCE)	708	0.13	−0.24	0	±0
Independent Spanish Phalanx (FEI)	555	0.10	New	0	±0
Communist Unity Candidacy (CUC)^{3}	527	0.10	−0.13	0	±0
Falangist Movement of Spain (MFE)	522	0.10	New	0	±0
Communist Party of Spain (Marxist–Leninist) (PCE (m–l))	463	0.09	New	0	±0
Communist Movement of the Murcian Region (MCRM)	0	0.00	−0.25	0	±0
Socialist Party (PS)^{4}	0	0.00	−1.71	0	±0
Blank ballots	1,854	0.35	−0.11		
Total	532,961			8	±0
Valid votes	532,961	98.49	−0.26		
Invalid votes	8,197	1.51	+0.26		
Votes cast / turnout	541,158	82.49	+9.78		
Abstentions	114,894	17.51	−9.78		
Registered voters	656,052				
Sources
Footnotes: ^{1} People's Alliance–People's Democratic Party results are compared to Democratic Coalition totals in the 1979 election.; ^{2} New Force results are compared to National Union totals in the 1979 election.; ^{3} Communist Unity Candidacy results are compared to Workers' Communist Party totals in the 1979 election.; ^{4} Socialist Party results are compared to Spanish Socialist Workers' Party (historical) totals in the 1979 election.

=== Navarre ===
← Summary of the 28 October 1982 Congress of Deputies election results in Navarre →
Parties and alliances	Popular vote			Seats	
Parties and alliances	Votes	%	±pp	Total	+/−
Spanish Socialist Workers' Party (PSOE)	112,186	37.64	+15.74	3	+2
Navarrese People's Union–Alliance–People's Democratic (UPN–AP–PDP)^{1}	76,255	25.59	+14.42	2	+1
Popular Unity (HB)	34,744	11.66	+2.80	0	±0
Union of the Democratic Centre (UCD)	31,245	10.48	−22.45	0	−3
Basque Nationalist Party (EAJ/PNV)	16,363	5.49	−2.93	0	±0
Democratic and Social Centre (CDS)	12,278	4.12	New	0	±0
Basque Country Left–Left for Socialism (EE)	8,399	2.82	New	0	±0
Communist Party of the Basque Country (PCE/EPK)	2,144	0.72	−1.50	0	±0
Workers' Socialist Party (PST)	1,088	0.37	New	0	±0
New Force (FN)^{2}	459	0.15	New	0	±0
Communist Party of Spain (Marxist–Leninist) (PCE (m–l))	311	0.10	New	0	±0
Communist Unification of Spain (UCE)	278	0.09	New	0	±0
Communist Unity Candidacy (CUC)	235	0.08	New	0	±0
Communist League–Internationalist Socialist Workers' Coalition (LC (COSI))	141	0.05	−0.21	0	±0
Communist Movement of the Basque Country (EMK)	0	0.00	−1.17	0	±0
Revolutionary Communist League (LKI)	0	0.00	−0.41	0	±0
Blank ballots	1,885	0.63	+0.31		
Total	298,011			5	±0
Valid votes	298,011	97.49	−0.95		
Invalid votes	7,682	2.51	+0.95		
Votes cast / turnout	305,693	81.33	+10.67		
Abstentions	70,153	18.67	−10.67		
Registered voters	375,846				
Sources
Footnotes: ^{1} Navarrese People's Union–Alliance–People's Democratic results are compared to Navarrese People's Union totals in the 1979 election.; ^{2} New Force results are compared to National Union totals in the 1979 election.

=== Valencian Community ===
← Summary of the 28 October 1982 Congress of Deputies election results in the Valencian Community →
Parties and alliances	Popular vote			Seats	
Parties and alliances	Votes	%	±pp	Total	+/−
Spanish Socialist Workers' Party (PSOE)	1,118,354	53.11	+15.80	19	+6
People's Alliance–People's Democratic Party–Valencian Union (AP–PDP–UV)^{1}	613,147	29.12	+24.62	10	+10
Union of the Democratic Centre (UCD)	133,255	6.33	−30.16	0	−13
Communist Party of the Valencian Country (PCE–PV)	97,837	4.65	−7.34	0	−3
Democratic and Social Centre (CDS)	51,891	2.46	New	0	±0
New Force (FN)^{2}	18,669	0.89	−1.42	0	±0
Valencian People's Union (UPV)^{3}	18,516	0.88	+0.12	0	±0
Workers' Socialist Party (PST)	11,967	0.57	New	0	±0
United Left of the Valencian Country (EUPV)	9,302	0.44	New	0	±0
Valencian Nationalist Left (ENV–URV)^{4}	6,738	0.32	−0.52	0	±0
Spanish Communist Workers' Party (PCOE)	4,906	0.23	New	0	±0
Communist Unification of Spain (UCE)	2,212	0.11	−0.04	0	±0
Spanish Solidarity (SE)	2,168	0.10	New	0	±0
Communist Unity Candidacy (CUC)^{5}	2,070	0.10	−0.47	0	±0
Falangist Movement of Spain (MFE)	1,753	0.08	New	0	±0
Communist Party of Spain (Marxist–Leninist) (PCE (m–l))	1,753	0.08	New	0	±0
Independent Spanish Phalanx (FEI)	966	0.05	New	0	±0
Communist League–Internationalist Socialist Workers' Coalition (LC (COSI))	935	0.04	New	0	±0
Republican Left (IR)	610	0.03	−0.49	0	±0
Socialist Party (PS)^{6}	0	0.00	−1.06	0	±0
Spanish Phalanx of the CNSO (FE–JONS)	0	0.00	New	0	±0
Blank ballots	8,561	0.41	+0.13		
Total	2,105,610			29	±0
Valid votes	2,105,610	97.72	−1.01		
Invalid votes	49,090	2.28	+1.01		
Votes cast / turnout	2,154,700	84.03	+9.14		
Abstentions	409,517	15.97	−9.14		
Registered voters	2,564,217				
Sources
Footnotes: ^{1} People's Alliance–People's Democratic Party–Valencian Union results are compared to Democratic Coalition totals in the 1979 election.; ^{2} New Force results are compared to National Union totals in the 1979 election.; ^{3} Valencian People's Union results are compared to Nationalist Party of the Valencian Country totals in the 1979 election.; ^{4} Valencian Nationalist Left results are compared to Valencian Regional Union totals in the 1979 election.; ^{5} Communist Unity Candidacy results are compared to Workers' Communist Party totals in the 1979 election.; ^{6} Socialist Party results are compared to Spanish Socialist Workers' Party (historical) totals in the 1979 election.

== Autonomous cities ==
=== Ceuta ===
← Summary of the 28 October 1982 Congress of Deputies election results in Ceuta →
Parties and alliances	Popular vote			Seats	
Parties and alliances	Votes	%	±pp	Total	+/−
Spanish Socialist Workers' Party (PSOE)	11,698	45.54	+10.23	1	+1
People's Alliance–People's Democratic Party (AP–PDP)^{1}	7,674	29.87	+22.01	0	±0
Democratic and Social Centre (CDS)	2,010	7.82	New	0	±0
Union of the Democratic Centre (UCD)	1,870	7.28	−44.59	0	−1
Nationalist Party of Ceuta (PNCe)	1,785	6.95	New	0	±0
Communist Party of Spain (PCE)	188	0.73	New	0	±0
New Force (FN)^{2}	173	0.67	−2.79	0	±0
Workers' Socialist Party (PST)	137	0.53	New	0	±0
Communist Unification of Spain (UCE)	19	0.07	New	0	±0
Communist Movement (MC)	17	0.07	−0.36	0	±0
Blank ballots	119	0.46	−0.07		
Total	25,690			1	±0
Valid votes	25,690	98.37	−0.51		
Invalid votes	427	1.63	+0.51		
Votes cast / turnout	26,117	72.29	+6.85		
Abstentions	10,011	27.71	−6.85		
Registered voters	36,128				
Sources
Footnotes: ^{1} People's Alliance–People's Democratic Party results are compared to Democratic Coalition totals in the 1979 election.; ^{2} New Force results are compared to National Union totals in the 1979 election.

=== Melilla ===
← Summary of the 28 October 1982 Congress of Deputies election results in Melilla →
Parties and alliances	Popular vote			Seats	
Parties and alliances	Votes	%	±pp	Total	+/−
Spanish Socialist Workers' Party (PSOE)	10,291	48.99	+27.59	1	+1
People's Alliance–People's Democratic Party (AP–PDP)^{1}	5,551	26.43	+21.59	0	±0
Union of the Democratic Centre (UCD)	3,083	14.68	−36.89	0	−1
Democratic and Social Centre (CDS)	1,615	7.69	New	0	±0
New Force (FN)^{2}	143	0.68	−1.77	0	±0
Spanish Solidarity (SE)	105	0.50	New	0	±0
Communist Unification of Spain (UCE)	66	0.31	New	0	±0
Communist Movement (MC)	0	0.00	−1.03	0	±0
Workers' Socialist Party (PST)	0	0.00	New	0	±0
Blank ballots	152	0.72	+0.36		
Total	21,006			1	±0
Valid votes	21,006	98.97	−0.09		
Invalid votes	218	1.03	+0.09		
Votes cast / turnout	21,224	70.50	+9.83		
Abstentions	8,883	29.50	−9.83		
Registered voters	30,107				
Sources
Footnotes: ^{1} People's Alliance–People's Democratic Party results are compared to Democratic Coalition totals in the 1979 election.; ^{2} New Force results are compared to National Union totals in the 1979 election.
