= Ciudad Real (Congress of Deputies constituency) =

Electoral constituency in Spain

Coordinates: 39°00′N 4°00′W

- Congress of Deputies; Electoral constituency
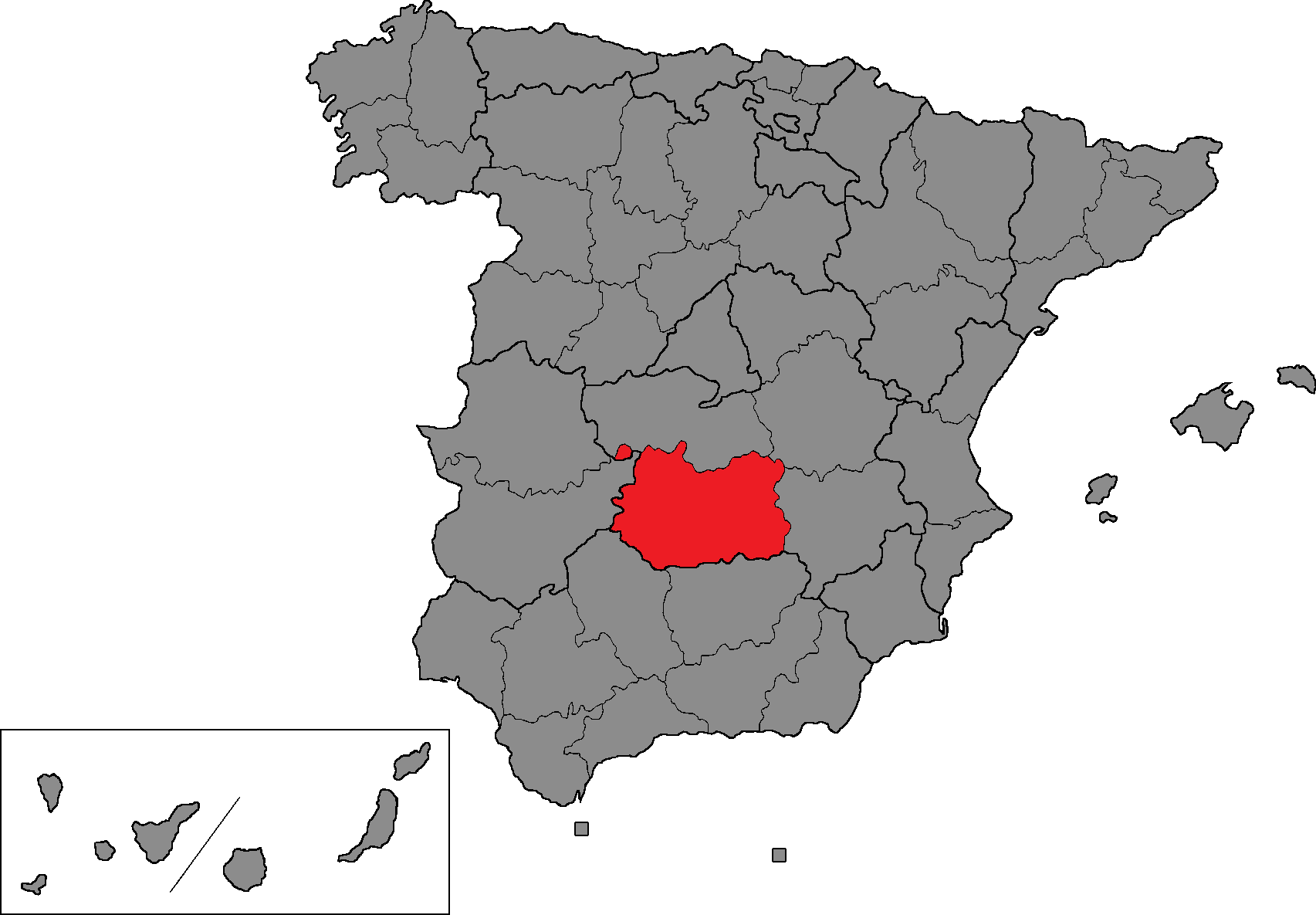
- Location of Ciudad Real within Spain
- Province: Ciudad Real
- Autonomous community: Castilla–La Mancha
- Population: ▲492,640 (2024)
- Electorate: ▼391,495 (2023)
- Major settlements: Ciudad Real, Puertollano, Tomelloso, Alcázar de San Juan

Current constituency
- Created: 1977
- Seats: 5
- Members: PP (2); PSOE (2); Vox (1)

Ciudad Real is one of the 52 constituencies represented in the Congress of Deputies, the lower chamber of the Spanish parliament, the Cortes Generales. The constituency (whose boundaries correspond to those of the homonymous province) currently elects five deputies. The electoral system uses the D'Hondt method and closed-list proportional voting, with a minimum threshold of three percent.

== Electoral system ==
The constituency was created as per the Political Reform Law and was first contested in the 1977 general election. The Law provided for the provinces of Spain to be established as multi-member districts in the Congress of Deputies, with this regulation being maintained under the Spanish Constitution of 1978. Additionally, the Constitution requires for any modification of the provincial limits to be approved under an organic law, needing an absolute majority in the Cortes Generales.

Voting is based on universal suffrage, comprising all Spanish nationals over 18 years of age with full political rights, provided that they have not been deprived of the right to vote by a final sentence. The only exception was in 1977, when this was limited to nationals over 21 years of age and in full enjoyment of their political and civil rights. Amendments in 2011 required non-resident citizens to apply for voting, a system known as "begged" voting (Spanish: Voto rogado). which was abolished in 2022. Further, amendments in 2018 granted the right to vote to those legally incapacitated. The Congress of Deputies has a minimum of 300 and a maximum of 400 seats, with electoral provisions fixing its size at 350. Of these, 348 are elected in 50 multi-member constituencies corresponding to the provinces of Spain—each of which is assigned an initial minimum of two seats and the remaining 248 distributed in proportion to population—using the D'Hondt method and closed-list proportional voting, with a three percent-threshold of valid votes (including blank ballots) in each constituency. The remaining two seats are allocated to Ceuta and Melilla as single-member districts elected by plurality voting. The use of this electoral method may result in a higher effective threshold depending on district magnitude and vote distribution. The law does not provide for by-elections to fill vacant seats; instead, any vacancies arising after the proclamation of candidates and during the legislative term are filled by the next candidates on the party lists or, when required, by designated substitutes.

The electoral law allows for parties and federations registered in the interior ministry, alliances and groupings of electors to present lists of candidates. Parties and federations intending to form an alliance are required to inform the relevant electoral commission within 10 days of the election call—15 before 1985—whereas groupings of electors need to secure the signature of at least one percent of the electorate in the constituencies for which they seek election—one permille of the electorate, with a compulsory minimum of 500 signatures, until 1985—disallowing electors from signing for more than one list. Also since 2011, parties, federations or alliances that have not obtained a mandate in either chamber of the Cortes at the preceding election are required to secure the signature of at least 0.1 percent of electors in the aforementioned constituencies. Amendments in 2007 required a balanced composition of men and women in the electoral lists, so that candidates of either sex made up at least 40 percent of the total composition; further amendments in 2024 required the use of a zipper system.

== Deputies ==
Deputies 1977–present
Key to parties PSOE Cs UCD PP CP AP Vox
Legislature	Election	Distribution
Constituent	1977	2 / 3
1st	1979	2 / 3
2nd	1982	3 / 2
3rd	1986	3 / 2
4th	1989	3 / 2
5th	1993	3 / 2
6th	1996	2 / 3
7th	2000	2 / 3
8th	2004	3 / 2
9th	2008	2 / 3
10th	2011	2 / 3
11th	2015	2 / 3
12th	2016	2 / 3
13th	2019 (Apr)	2 / 1 / 1 / 1
14th	2019 (Nov)	2 / 2 / 1
15th	2023	2 / 2 / 1

== General elections ==
=== 2026 ===
Summary of the 29 November 2026 Congress of Deputies election results in Ciudad Real
Parties and alliances	Popular vote			Seats	
Parties and alliances	Votes	%	±pp	Total	+/−
People's Party (PP)					
Spanish Socialist Workers' Party (PSOE)					
Vox (Vox)					
Broad Front (FA)^{1}			n/a		
We Can (Podemos)^{1}			n/a		
Workers' Front (FO)					
Blank ballots					
Total				5	±0
Valid votes					
Invalid votes					
Votes cast / turnout					
Abstentions					
Registered voters	393,421				
Sources
Footnotes: ^{1} Within the Unite alliance in the 2023 election.

=== 2023 ===
Summary of the 23 July 2023 Congress of Deputies election results in Ciudad Real
Parties and alliances	Popular vote			Seats	
Parties and alliances	Votes	%	±pp	Total	+/−
People's Party (PP)	114,709	40.54	+12.68	2	±0
Spanish Socialist Workers' Party (PSOE)	100,102	35.37	+1.10	2	±0
Vox (Vox)	46,046	16.27	–4.60	1	±0
Unite (Sumar)^{1}	17,405	6.15	–2.13	0	±0
Animalist Party with the Environment (PACMA)^{2}	1,319	0.47	–0.20	0	±0
Workers' Front (FO)	447	0.16	New	0	±0
For a Fairer World (PUM+J)	365	0.13	–0.05	0	±0
Zero Cuts (Recortes Cero)	233	0.08	–0.09	0	±0
Blank ballots	2,353	0.83	–0.05		
Total	282,979			5	±0
Valid votes	282,979	98.64	+0.06		
Invalid votes	3,916	1.36	–0.06		
Votes cast / turnout	286,895	73.28	+4.44		
Abstentions	104,600	26.72	–4.44		
Registered voters	391,495				
Sources
Footnotes: ^{1} Unite results are compared to United We Can totals in the November 2019 election.; ^{2} Animalist Party with the Environment results are compared to Animalist Party Against Mistreatment of Animals totals in the November 2019 election.

=== November 2019 ===
Summary of the 10 November 2019 Congress of Deputies election results in Ciudad Real
Parties and alliances	Popular vote			Seats	
Parties and alliances	Votes	%	±pp	Total	+/−
Spanish Socialist Workers' Party (PSOE)	92,046	34.27	±0.00	2	±0
People's Party (PP)	74,835	27.86	+4.19	2	+1
Vox (Vox)	56,050	20.87	+7.15	1	±0
United We Can (Podemos–IU)	22,250	8.28	–0.89	0	±0
Citizens–Party of the Citizenry (Cs)	18,337	6.83	–10.43	0	–1
Animalist Party Against Mistreatment of Animals (PACMA)	1,788	0.67	–0.13	0	±0
For a Fairer World (PUM+J)	484	0.18	New	0	±0
Zero Cuts–Green Group–PCAS–TC (Recortes Cero–GV–PCAS–TC)	447	0.17	–0.01	0	±0
Blank ballots	2,357	0.88	+0.04		
Total	268,594			5	±0
Valid votes	268,594	98.58	±0.00		
Invalid votes	3,876	1.42	±0.00		
Votes cast / turnout	272,470	68.84	–6.35		
Abstentions	123,315	31.16	+6.35		
Registered voters	395,785				

=== April 2019 ===
Summary of the 28 April 2019 Congress of Deputies election results in Ciudad Real
Parties and alliances	Popular vote			Seats	
Parties and alliances	Votes	%	±pp	Total	+/−
Spanish Socialist Workers' Party (PSOE)	100,720	34.27	+5.02	2	±0
People's Party (PP)	69,559	23.67	–19.86	1	–2
Citizens–Party of the Citizenry (Cs)	50,733	17.26	+5.40	1	+1
Vox (Vox)	40,313	13.72	New	1	+1
United We Can (Podemos–IU–Equo)	26,952	9.17	–4.26	0	±0
Animalist Party Against Mistreatment of Animals (PACMA)	2,360	0.80	–0.04	0	±0
Zero Cuts–Green Group–PCAS–TC (Recortes Cero–GV–PCAS–TC)	529	0.18	+0.02	0	±0
European Retirees Social Democratic Party–Centre Unity (PDSJE–UdeC)	277	0.09	New	0	±0
Blank ballots	2,464	0.84	+0.15		
Total	293,907			5	±0
Valid votes	293,907	98.58	–0.27		
Invalid votes	4,241	1.42	+0.27		
Votes cast / turnout	298,148	75.19	+4.63		
Abstentions	98,362	24.81	–4.63		
Registered voters	396,510				

=== 2016 ===
Summary of the 26 June 2016 Congress of Deputies election results in Ciudad Real
Parties and alliances	Popular vote			Seats	
Parties and alliances	Votes	%	±pp	Total	+/−
People's Party (PP)	121,622	43.53	+5.15	3	±0
Spanish Socialist Workers' Party (PSOE)	81,728	29.25	–1.86	2	±0
United We Can (Podemos–IU–Equo)^{1}	37,510	13.43	–2.38	0	±0
Citizens–Party of the Citizenry (C's)	33,126	11.86	–0.48	0	±0
Animalist Party Against Mistreatment of Animals (PACMA)	2,334	0.84	+0.18	0	±0
Union, Progress and Democracy (UPyD)	679	0.24	–0.31	0	±0
Zero Cuts–Green Group (Recortes Cero–GV)	458	0.16	+0.03	0	±0
Blank ballots	1,939	0.69	–0.08		
Total	279,396			5	±0
Valid votes	279,396	98.85	±0.00		
Invalid votes	3,238	1.15	±0.00		
Votes cast / turnout	282,634	70.56	–3.84		
Abstentions	117,918	29.44	+3.84		
Registered voters	400,552				
Sources
Footnotes: ^{1} United We Can results are compared to the combined totals of We Can and United Left–Popular Unity in Common in the 2015 election.

=== 2015 ===
Summary of the 20 December 2015 Congress of Deputies election results in Ciudad Real
Parties and alliances	Popular vote			Seats	
Parties and alliances	Votes	%	±pp	Total	+/−
People's Party (PP)	113,451	38.38	–16.85	3	±0
Spanish Socialist Workers' Party (PSOE)	91,959	31.11	–0.86	2	±0
We Can (Podemos)	36,879	12.48	New	0	±0
Citizens–Party of the Citizenry (C's)	36,477	12.34	New	0	±0
United Left–Popular Unity in Common (IU–UPeC)	9,834	3.33	–2.07	0	±0
Animalist Party Against Mistreatment of Animals (PACMA)	1,949	0.66	+0.38	0	±0
Union, Progress and Democracy (UPyD)	1,625	0.55	–3.84	0	±0
Vox (Vox)	560	0.19	New	0	±0
Zero Cuts–Green Group (Recortes Cero–GV)	386	0.13	New	0	±0
National Democracy (DN)	174	0.06	New	0	±0
Blank ballots	2,282	0.77	–0.58		
Total	295,576			5	±0
Valid votes	295,576	98.85	+0.26		
Invalid votes	3,427	1.15	–0.26		
Votes cast / turnout	299,003	74.40	–0.36		
Abstentions	102,882	25.60	+0.36		
Registered voters	401,885				

=== 2011 ===
Summary of the 20 November 2011 Congress of Deputies election results in Ciudad Real
Parties and alliances	Popular vote			Seats	
Parties and alliances	Votes	%	±pp	Total	+/−
People's Party (PP)	164,776	55.23	+7.45	3	±0
Spanish Socialist Workers' Party (PSOE)	95,375	31.97	–14.80	2	±0
United Left of Castilla–La Mancha–The Greens: Plural Left (IUCLM–LV)	16,116	5.40	+2.78	0	±0
Union, Progress and Democracy (UPyD)	13,106	4.39	+3.57	0	±0
Equo (Equo)	1,517	0.51	New	0	±0
Blank Seats (EB)	1,225	0.41	New	0	±0
Animalist Party Against Mistreatment of Animals (PACMA)	836	0.28	+0.17	0	±0
Citizens of Democratic Centre (CCD)	469	0.16	New	0	±0
Communist Party of the Peoples of Spain (PCPE)	423	0.14	+0.09	0	±0
For a Fairer World (PUM+J)	381	0.13	+0.05	0	±0
Communist Unification of Spain (UCE)	101	0.03	New	0	±0
Blank ballots	4,016	1.35	+0.31		
Total	298,341			5	±0
Valid votes	298,341	98.59	–0.67		
Invalid votes	4,264	1.41	+0.67		
Votes cast / turnout	302,605	74.76	–3.78		
Abstentions	102,159	25.24	+3.78		
Registered voters	404,764				

=== 2008 ===
Summary of the 9 March 2008 Congress of Deputies election results in Ciudad Real
Parties and alliances	Popular vote			Seats	
Parties and alliances	Votes	%	±pp	Total	+/−
People's Party (PP)	148,363	47.78	+1.21	3	+1
Spanish Socialist Workers' Party (PSOE)	145,225	46.77	–1.35	2	–1
United Left–Alternative (IU)	8,137	2.62	–0.18	0	±0
Union, Progress and Democracy (UPyD)	2,546	0.82	New	0	±0
The Greens of Europe (LVdE)	784	0.25	New	0	±0
Anti-Bullfighting Party Against Mistreatment of Animals (PACMA)	353	0.11	New	0	±0
Social Democratic Party (PSD)	295	0.10	New	0	±0
For a Fairer World (PUM+J)	249	0.08	New	0	±0
Citizens for Blank Votes (CenB)	238	0.08	–0.08	0	±0
Castilian Unity (UdCa)	198	0.06	–0.14	0	±0
Spanish Phalanx of the CNSO (FE de las JONS)	183	0.06	+0.01	0	±0
Communist Party of the Peoples of Spain (PCPE)	145	0.05	–0.01	0	±0
Citizens–Party of the Citizenry (C's)	118	0.04	New	0	±0
Commoners' Land (TC)	113	0.04	–0.04	0	±0
National Democracy (DN)	83	0.03	–0.01	0	±0
Spanish Alternative (AES)	80	0.03	New	0	±0
Family and Life Party (PFyV)	56	0.02	New	0	±0
Humanist Party (PH)	54	0.02	–0.07	0	±0
Spain 2000 (E–2000)	43	0.01	New	0	±0
Carlist Traditionalist Communion (CTC)	19	0.01	New	0	±0
Blank ballots	3,243	1.04	–0.50		
Total	310,525			5	±0
Valid votes	310,525	99.26	+0.18		
Invalid votes	2,328	0.74	–0.18		
Votes cast / turnout	312,853	78.54	–0.03		
Abstentions	85,490	21.46	+0.12		
Registered voters	398,343				

=== 2004 ===
Summary of the 14 March 2004 Congress of Deputies election results in Ciudad Real
Parties and alliances	Popular vote			Seats	
Parties and alliances	Votes	%	±pp	Total	+/−
Spanish Socialist Workers' Party (PSOE)	147,271	48.12	+5.56	3	+1
People's Party (PP)	142,508	46.57	–5.12	2	–1
United Left–Left of Castilla–La Mancha (IU–ICAM)	8,581	2.80	–0.92	0	±0
Castilian Unity (UdCa)	601	0.20	New	0	±0
Citizens for Blank Votes (CenB)	485	0.16	New	0	±0
Democratic and Social Centre (CDS)	351	0.11	–0.02	0	±0
Humanist Party (PH)	288	0.09	–0.03	0	±0
Commoners' Land–Castilian Nationalist Party (TC–PNC)	247	0.08	–0.08	0	±0
Communist Party of the Peoples of Spain (PCPE)	192	0.06	New	0	±0
Spanish Phalanx of the CNSO (FE de las JONS)	141	0.05	New	0	±0
Spanish Democratic Party (PADE)	140	0.05	+0.01	0	±0
The Phalanx (FE)	132	0.04	–0.04	0	±0
National Democracy (DN)	128	0.04	New	0	±0
Republican Left (IR)	108	0.04	New	0	±0
Republican Social Movement (MSR)	85	0.03	New	0	±0
Authentic Phalanx (FA)	62	0.02	New	0	±0
Blank ballots	4,721	1.54	+0.29		
Total	306,041			5	±0
Valid votes	306,041	99.08	–0.13		
Invalid votes	2,856	0.92	+0.13		
Votes cast / turnout	308,897	78.57	+3.81		
Abstentions	84,263	21.43	–3.81		
Registered voters	393,160				

=== 2000 ===
Summary of the 12 March 2000 Congress of Deputies election results in Ciudad Real
Parties and alliances	Popular vote			Seats	
Parties and alliances	Votes	%	±pp	Total	+/−
People's Party (PP)	150,842	51.69	+6.66	3	+1
Spanish Socialist Workers' Party–Progressives (PSOE–p)	124,180	42.56	–2.66	2	–1
United Left (IU)	10,843	3.72	–4.46	0	±0
Natural Law Party (PLN)	552	0.19	New	0	±0
Commoners' Land–Castilian Nationalist Party (TC–PNC)	459	0.16	+0.11	0	±0
Centrist Union–Democratic and Social Centre (UC–CDS)	384	0.13	–0.14	0	±0
Humanist Party (PH)	339	0.12	+0.03	0	±0
The Phalanx (FE)	241	0.08	New	0	±0
Spain 2000 Platform (ES2000)	184	0.06	New	0	±0
Spanish Democratic Party (PADE)	120	0.04	New	0	±0
Blank ballots	3,655	1.25	+0.41		
Total	291,799			5	±0
Valid votes	291,799	99.21	–0.15		
Invalid votes	2,323	0.79	+0.15		
Votes cast / turnout	294,122	74.76	–7.51		
Abstentions	99,297	25.24	+7.51		
Registered voters	393,419				

=== 1996 ===
Summary of the 3 March 1996 Congress of Deputies election results in Ciudad Real
Parties and alliances	Popular vote			Seats	
Parties and alliances	Votes	%	±pp	Total	+/−
Spanish Socialist Workers' Party (PSOE)	142,101	45.22	–3.79	3	±0
People's Party (PP)	141,494	45.03	+5.28	2	±0
United Left–Left of Castilla–La Mancha (IU–ICAM)	25,689	8.18	+0.89	0	±0
Centrist Union (UC)	862	0.27	–1.86	0	±0
Regionalist Party of Castilla–La Mancha (PRCM)	788	0.25	New	0	±0
Humanist Party (PH)	290	0.09	+0.05	0	±0
Workers' Revolutionary Party (PRT)	208	0.07	New	0	±0
Commoners' Land–Castilian Nationalist Party (TC–PNC)	149	0.05	–0.01	0	±0
Blank ballots	2,632	0.84	+0.15		
Total	314,213			5	±0
Valid votes	314,213	99.36	+0.03		
Invalid votes	2,015	0.64	–0.03		
Votes cast / turnout	316,228	82.27	+1.44		
Abstentions	68,129	17.73	–1.44		
Registered voters	384,357				

=== 1993 ===
Summary of the 6 June 1993 Congress of Deputies election results in Ciudad Real
Parties and alliances	Popular vote			Seats	
Parties and alliances	Votes	%	±pp	Total	+/−
Spanish Socialist Workers' Party (PSOE)	146,867	49.01	–3.35	3	±0
People's Party (PP)	119,123	39.75	+9.78	2	±0
United Left (IU)	21,856	7.29	+0.98	0	±0
Democratic and Social Centre (CDS)	6,383	2.13	–5.80	0	±0
The Greens (Verdes)^{1}	1,481	0.49	–0.26	0	±0
The Ecologists (LE)	717	0.24	–0.25	0	±0
Ruiz-Mateos Group–European Democratic Alliance (ARM–ADE)	550	0.18	–0.62	0	±0
Commoners' Land–Castilian Nationalist Party (TC–PNC)	187	0.06	New	0	±0
Natural Law Party (PLN)	162	0.05	New	0	±0
Coalition for a New Socialist Party (CNPS)^{2}	154	0.05	–0.02	0	±0
Humanist Party (PH)	121	0.04	–0.02	0	±0
Communist Unification of Spain (UCE)	0	0.00	New	0	±0
Blank ballots	2,055	0.69	+0.15		
Total	299,656			5	±0
Valid votes	299,656	99.33	+0.24		
Invalid votes	2,033	0.67	–0.24		
Votes cast / turnout	301,689	80.83	+5.73		
Abstentions	71,549	19.17	–5.73		
Registered voters	373,238				
Sources
Footnotes: ^{1} The Greens results are compared to The Greens–Green List totals in the 1989 election.; ^{2} Coalition for a New Socialist Party results are compared to Alliance for the Republic totals in the 1989 election.

=== 1989 ===
Summary of the 29 October 1989 Congress of Deputies election results in Ciudad Real
Parties and alliances	Popular vote			Seats	
Parties and alliances	Votes	%	±pp	Total	+/−
Spanish Socialist Workers' Party (PSOE)	143,416	52.36	+0.78	3	±0
People's Party (PP)^{1}	82,074	29.97	–2.05	2	±0
Democratic and Social Centre (CDS)	21,717	7.93	–1.42	0	±0
United Left (IU)	17,285	6.31	+2.66	0	±0
Ruiz-Mateos Group (Ruiz-Mateos)	2,193	0.80	New	0	±0
The Greens–Green List (LV–LV)	2,063	0.75	New	0	±0
The Ecologist Greens (LVE)	1,351	0.49	New	0	±0
Workers' Socialist Party (PST)	948	0.35	+0.05	0	±0
Workers' Party of Spain–Communist Unity (PTE–UC)^{2}	501	0.18	–0.42	0	±0
Communist Party of the Peoples of Spain (PCPE)	388	0.14	New	0	±0
Alliance for the Republic (AxR)^{3}	195	0.07	–0.06	0	±0
Humanist Party (PH)	168	0.06	New	0	±0
Centrist Unity–Democratic Spanish Party (PED)	105	0.04	New	0	±0
Blank ballots	1,480	0.54	–0.05		
Total	273,884			5	±0
Valid votes	273,884	99.09	+0.57		
Invalid votes	2,505	0.91	–0.57		
Votes cast / turnout	276,389	75.10	+1.69		
Abstentions	91,655	24.90	–1.69		
Registered voters	368,044				
Sources
Footnotes: ^{1} People's Party results are compared to People's Coalition totals in the 1986 election.; ^{2} Workers' Party of Spain–Communist Unity results are compared to Communists' Unity Board totals in the 1986 election.; ^{3} Alliance for the Republic results are compared to Internationalist Socialist Workers' Party totals in the 1986 election.

=== 1986 ===
Summary of the 22 June 1986 Congress of Deputies election results in Ciudad Real
Parties and alliances	Popular vote			Seats	
Parties and alliances	Votes	%	±pp	Total	+/−
Spanish Socialist Workers' Party (PSOE)	138,568	51.58	–2.38	3	±0
People's Coalition (AP–PDP–PL)^{1}	86,031	32.02	+3.81	2	±0
Democratic and Social Centre (CDS)	25,128	9.35	+7.37	0	±0
United Left (IU)^{2}	9,793	3.65	+0.93	0	±0
Democratic Reformist Party (PRD)	2,161	0.80	New	0	±0
Communists' Unity Board (MUC)	1,625	0.60	New	0	±0
Spanish Phalanx of the CNSO (FE–JONS)	1,568	0.58	+0.29	0	±0
Workers' Socialist Party (PST)	814	0.30	–0.12	0	±0
Communist Unification of Spain (UCE)	604	0.22	+0.17	0	±0
Republican Popular Unity (UPR)	422	0.16	New	0	±0
Internationalist Socialist Workers' Party (POSI)	344	0.13	New	0	±0
Blank ballots	1,582	0.59	+0.21		
Total	268,640			5	±0
Valid votes	268,640	98.52	+0.33		
Invalid votes	4,034	1.48	–0.33		
Votes cast / turnout	272,674	73.41	–10.02		
Abstentions	98,769	26.59	+10.02		
Registered voters	371,443				
Sources
Footnotes: ^{1} People's Coalition results are compared to People's Alliance–People's Democratic Party totals in the 1982 election.; ^{2} United Left results are compared to Communist Party of Spain totals in the 1982 election.

=== 1982 ===
Summary of the 28 October 1982 Congress of Deputies election results in Ciudad Real
Parties and alliances	Popular vote			Seats	
Parties and alliances	Votes	%	±pp	Total	+/−
Spanish Socialist Workers' Party (PSOE)	151,168	53.96	+14.59	3	+1
People's Alliance–People's Democratic Party (AP–PDP)^{1}	79,037	28.21	+23.43	2	+2
Union of the Democratic Centre (UCD)	29,443	10.51	–30.87	0	–3
Communist Party of Spain (PCE)	7,627	2.72	–5.14	0	±0
Democratic and Social Centre (CDS)	5,543	1.98	New	0	±0
New Force (FN)^{2}	3,222	1.15	–2.95	0	±0
Workers' Socialist Party (PST)	1,182	0.42	New	0	±0
Spanish Phalanx of the CNSO (FE–JONS)	809	0.29	New	0	±0
Spanish Communist Workers' Party (PCOE)	402	0.14	New	0	±0
Spanish Solidarity (SE)	236	0.08	New	0	±0
Revolutionary Communist League (LCR)	154	0.05	New	0	±0
Communist League–Internationalist Socialist Workers' Coalition (LC (COSI))	149	0.05	New	0	±0
Communist Unification of Spain (UCE)	140	0.05	New	0	±0
Blank ballots	1,062	0.38	+0.19		
Total	280,174			5	±0
Valid votes	280,174	98.19	–0.85		
Invalid votes	5,152	1.81	+0.85		
Votes cast / turnout	285,326	83.43	+15.18		
Abstentions	56,683	16.57	–15.18		
Registered voters	342,009				
Sources
Footnotes: ^{1} People's Alliance–People's Democratic Party results are compared to Democratic Coalition totals in the 1979 election.; ^{2} New Force results are compared to National Union totals in the 1979 election.

=== 1979 ===
Summary of the 1 March 1979 Congress of Deputies election results in Ciudad Real
Parties and alliances	Popular vote			Seats	
Parties and alliances	Votes	%	±pp	Total	+/−
Union of the Democratic Centre (UCD)	100,896	41.38	+0.13	3	±0
Spanish Socialist Workers' Party (PSOE)^{1}	95,996	39.37	+1.78	2	±0
Communist Party of Spain (PCE)	19,171	7.86	+1.59	0	±0
Democratic Coalition (CD)^{2}	11,659	4.78	–7.84	0	±0
National Union (UN)^{3}	10,004	4.10	+2.86	0	±0
Party of Labour of Spain (PTE)^{4}	2,238	0.92	+0.44	0	±0
Workers' Revolutionary Organization (ORT)	1,296	0.53	New	0	±0
Spanish Phalanx of the CNSO (Authentic) (FE–JONS(A))	910	0.37	New	0	±0
Communist Organization of Spain (Red Flag) (OCE–BR)	840	0.34	New	0	±0
Carlist Party (PC)	388	0.16	New	0	±0
Blank ballots	453	0.19	–0.02		
Total	243,851			5	±0
Valid votes	243,851	99.04	+0.22		
Invalid votes	2,352	0.96	–0.22		
Votes cast / turnout	246,003	68.25	–12.61		
Abstentions	114,544	31.75	+12.61		
Registered voters	360,747				
Sources
Footnotes: ^{1} Spanish Socialist Workers' Party results are compared to the combined totals of Spanish Socialist Workers' Party and People's Socialist Party–Socialist Unity in the 1977 election.; ^{2} Democratic Coalition results are compared to People's Alliance totals in the 1977 election.; ^{3} National Union results are compared to National Alliance July 18 totals in the 1977 election.; ^{4} Party of Labour of Spain results are compared to Democratic Left Front totals in the 1977 election.

=== 1977 ===
Summary of the 15 June 1977 Congress of Deputies election results in Ciudad Real
Parties and alliances	Popular vote			Seats	
Parties and alliances	Votes	%	±pp	Total	+/−
Union of the Democratic Centre (UCD)	102,362	41.25	n/a	3	n/a
Spanish Socialist Workers' Party (PSOE)	79,715	32.12	n/a	2	n/a
People's Alliance (AP)	31,310	12.62	n/a	0	n/a
Communist Party of Spain (PCE)	15,562	6.27	n/a	0	n/a
People's Socialist Party–Socialist Unity (PSP–US)	13,582	5.47	n/a	0	n/a
National Alliance July 18 (AN18)	3,085	1.24	n/a	0	n/a
Democratic Left Front (FDI)	1,203	0.48	n/a	0	n/a
Democratic Socialist Alliance (ASDCI)	811	0.33	n/a	0	n/a
Blank ballots	512	0.21	n/a		
Total	248,142			5	n/a
Valid votes	248,142	98.82	n/a		
Invalid votes	2,973	1.18	n/a		
Votes cast / turnout	251,115	80.86	n/a		
Abstentions	59,432	19.14	n/a		
Registered voters	310,547				

== Bibliography ==
- Ley 1/1977, de 4 de enero, para la Reforma Política (Fundamental Law 1/1977). Official State Gazette (in Spanish). 4 January 1977. BOE-A-1977-165.
- Real Decreto-ley 20/1977, de 18 de marzo, sobre Normas Electorales (Royal Decree-Law 20/1977). Official State Gazette (in Spanish). 18 March 1977. BOE-A-1977-7445.
- Constitución Española (Constitution). Official State Gazette (in Spanish). 27 December 1978. BOE-A-1978-31229.
- Ley Orgánica 5/1985, de 19 de junio, del Régimen Electoral General (Organic Law 5/1985). Official State Gazette (in Spanish). 19 June 1985. BOE-A-1985-11672.
- Carreras de Odriozola, Albert; Tafunell Sambola, Xavier (2005) [1989]. Estadísticas históricas de España, siglos XIX-XX (PDF) (in Spanish). Vol. 1 (II ed.). Bilbao: Fundación BBVA. pp. 1072–1097. ISBN 84-96515-00-1. Archived from the original (PDF) on 24 September 2015.
