= Toledo (Congress of Deputies constituency) =

Electoral constituency in Spain

Coordinates: 39°50′N 4°00′W

- Congress of Deputies; Electoral constituency
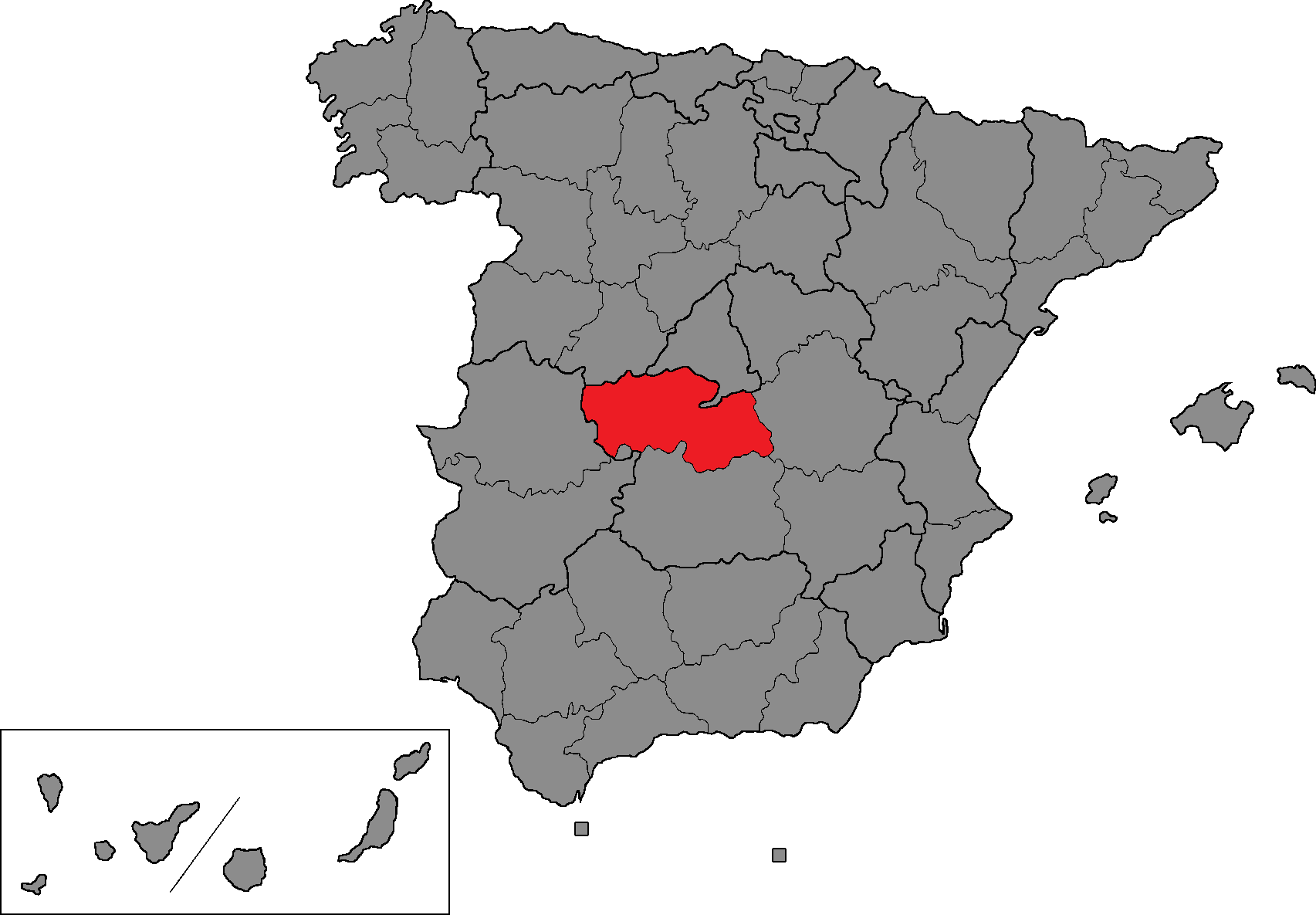
- Location of Toledo within Spain
- Province: Toledo
- Autonomous community: Castilla–La Mancha
- Population: ▲740,148 (2024)
- Electorate: ▲542,567 (2023)
- Major settlements: Talavera de la Reina, Toledo

Current constituency
- Created: 1977
- Seats: 5 (1977–2008); 6 (2008–present)
- Members: PP (3); PSOE (2); Vox (1)

Toledo is one of the 52 constituencies represented in the Congress of Deputies, the lower chamber of the Spanish parliament, the Cortes Generales. The constituency (whose boundaries correspond to those of the homonymous province) currently elects six deputies. The electoral system uses the D'Hondt method and closed-list proportional voting, with a minimum threshold of three percent.

== Electoral system ==
The constituency was created as per the Political Reform Law and was first contested in the 1977 general election. The Law provided for the provinces of Spain to be established as multi-member districts in the Congress of Deputies, with this regulation being maintained under the Spanish Constitution of 1978. Additionally, the Constitution requires for any modification of the provincial limits to be approved under an organic law, needing an absolute majority in the Cortes Generales.

Voting is based on universal suffrage, comprising all Spanish nationals over 18 years of age with full political rights, provided that they have not been deprived of the right to vote by a final sentence. The only exception was in 1977, when this was limited to nationals over 21 years of age and in full enjoyment of their political and civil rights. Amendments in 2011 required non-resident citizens to apply for voting, a system known as "begged" voting (Spanish: Voto rogado). which was abolished in 2022. Further, amendments in 2018 granted the right to vote to those legally incapacitated. The Congress of Deputies has a minimum of 300 and a maximum of 400 seats, with electoral provisions fixing its size at 350. Of these, 348 are elected in 50 multi-member constituencies corresponding to the provinces of Spain—each of which is assigned an initial minimum of two seats and the remaining 248 distributed in proportion to population—using the D'Hondt method and closed-list proportional voting, with a three percent-threshold of valid votes (including blank ballots) in each constituency. The remaining two seats are allocated to Ceuta and Melilla as single-member districts elected by plurality voting. The use of this electoral method may result in a higher effective threshold depending on district magnitude and vote distribution. The law does not provide for by-elections to fill vacant seats; instead, any vacancies arising after the proclamation of candidates and during the legislative term are filled by the next candidates on the party lists or, when required, by designated substitutes.

The electoral law allows for parties and federations registered in the interior ministry, alliances and groupings of electors to present lists of candidates. Parties and federations intending to form an alliance are required to inform the relevant electoral commission within 10 days of the election call—15 before 1985—whereas groupings of electors need to secure the signature of at least one percent of the electorate in the constituencies for which they seek election—one permille of the electorate, with a compulsory minimum of 500 signatures, until 1985—disallowing electors from signing for more than one list. Also since 2011, parties, federations or alliances that have not obtained a mandate in either chamber of the Cortes at the preceding election are required to secure the signature of at least 0.1 percent of electors in the aforementioned constituencies. Amendments in 2007 required a balanced composition of men and women in the electoral lists, so that candidates of either sex made up at least 40 percent of the total composition; further amendments in 2024 required the use of a zipper system.

== Deputies ==
Deputies 1977–present
Key to parties U.Podemos Podemos PSOE Cs UCD PP CP AP Vox
Legislature	Election	Distribution
Constituent	1977	2 / 2 / 1
1st	1979	2 / 3
2nd	1982	3 / 2
3rd	1986	3 / 2
4th	1989	3 / 2
5th	1993	3 / 2
6th	1996	2 / 3
7th	2000	2 / 3
8th	2004	2 / 3
9th	2008	3 / 3
10th	2011	2 / 4
11th	2015	1 / 2 / 1 / 2
12th	2016	1 / 2 / 3
13th	2019 (Apr)	2 / 1 / 2 / 1
14th	2019 (Nov)	2 / 2 / 2
15th	2023	2 / 3 / 1

== General elections ==
=== 2026 ===
Summary of the 29 November 2026 Congress of Deputies election results in Toledo
Parties and alliances	Popular vote			Seats	
Parties and alliances	Votes	%	±pp	Total	+/−
People's Party (PP)					
Spanish Socialist Workers' Party (PSOE)					
Vox (Vox)					
Broad Front (FA)^{1}			n/a		
We Can (Podemos)^{1}			n/a		
Workers' Front (FO)					
Spanish Phalanx of the CNSO (FE de las JONS)					
The Party is Over (SALF)			New		
Communist Party of the Workers of Spain (PCTE)			New		
Blank ballots					
Total				6	±0
Valid votes					
Invalid votes					
Votes cast / turnout					
Abstentions					
Registered voters	569,549				
Sources
Footnotes: ^{1} Within the Unite alliance in the 2023 election.

=== 2023 ===
Summary of the 23 July 2023 Congress of Deputies election results in Toledo
Parties and alliances	Popular vote			Seats	
Parties and alliances	Votes	%	±pp	Total	+/−
People's Party (PP)	146,533	37.84	+11.87	3	+1
Spanish Socialist Workers' Party (PSOE)	126,072	32.56	+0.57	2	±0
Vox (Vox)	76,044	19.64	–4.03	1	–1
Unite (Sumar)^{1}	31,876	8.23	–1.35	0	±0
Animalist Party with the Environment (PACMA)^{2}	2,024	0.52	–0.22	0	±0
Workers' Front (FO)	985	0.25	New	0	±0
For a Fairer World (PUM+J)	499	0.13	–0.05	0	±0
Spanish Phalanx of the CNSO (FE de las JONS)	281	0.07	New	0	±0
Zero Cuts (Recortes Cero)	275	0.07	–0.08	0	±0
Blank ballots	2,611	0.67	–0.06		
Total	387,200			6	±0
Valid votes	387,200	98.53	–0.07		
Invalid votes	5,788	1.47	+0.07		
Votes cast / turnout	392,988	72.43	+2.32		
Abstentions	149,579	27.57	–2.32		
Registered voters	542,567				
Sources
Footnotes: ^{1} Unite results are compared to United We Can totals in the November 2019 election.; ^{2} Animalist Party with the Environment results are compared to Animalist Party Against Mistreatment of Animals totals in the November 2019 election.

=== November 2019 ===
Summary of the 10 November 2019 Congress of Deputies election results in Toledo
Parties and alliances	Popular vote			Seats	
Parties and alliances	Votes	%	±pp	Total	+/−
Spanish Socialist Workers' Party (PSOE)	116,282	31.99	+0.86	2	±0
People's Party (PP)	94,378	25.97	+4.02	2	±0
Vox (Vox)	86,049	23.67	+6.81	2	+1
United We Can (Podemos–IU)	34,837	9.58	–0.99	0	±0
Citizens–Party of the Citizenry (Cs)	24,871	6.84	–10.72	0	–1
Animalist Party Against Mistreatment of Animals (PACMA)	2,680	0.74	–0.25	0	±0
For a Fairer World (PUM+J)	661	0.18	+0.04	0	±0
Zero Cuts–Green Group–PCAS–TC (Recortes Cero–GV–PCAS–TC)	556	0.15	–0.03	0	±0
Communist Party of the Peoples of Spain (PCPE)	282	0.08	New	0	±0
Communist Party of the Workers of Spain (PCTE)	217	0.06	New	0	±0
Blank ballots	2,661	0.73	+0.10		
Total	363,474			6	±0
Valid votes	363,474	98.60	+0.08		
Invalid votes	5,145	1.40	–0.08		
Votes cast / turnout	368,619	70.11	–6.73		
Abstentions	157,133	29.89	+6.73		
Registered voters	525,752				

=== April 2019 ===
Summary of the 28 April 2019 Congress of Deputies election results in Toledo
Parties and alliances	Popular vote			Seats	
Parties and alliances	Votes	%	±pp	Total	+/−
Spanish Socialist Workers' Party (PSOE)	123,561	31.13	+4.54	2	±0
People's Party (PP)	87,134	21.95	–21.46	2	–1
Citizens–Party of the Citizenry (Cs)	69,678	17.56	+4.58	1	+1
Vox (Vox)	66,927	16.86	+16.58	1	+1
United We Can (Podemos–IU–Equo)	41,934	10.57	–4.12	0	–1
Animalist Party Against Mistreatment of Animals (PACMA)	3,931	0.99	+0.07	0	±0
Zero Cuts–Green Group–PCAS–TC (Recortes Cero–GV–PCAS–TC)	703	0.18	+0.03	0	±0
For a Fairer World (PUM+J)	559	0.14	New	0	±0
Blank ballots	2,483	0.63	+0.09		
Total	396,910			6	±0
Valid votes	396,910	98.52	–0.31		
Invalid votes	5,976	1.48	+0.31		
Votes cast / turnout	402,886	76.84	+5.08		
Abstentions	121,440	23.16	–5.08		
Registered voters	524,326				

=== 2016 ===
Summary of the 26 June 2016 Congress of Deputies election results in Toledo
Parties and alliances	Popular vote			Seats	
Parties and alliances	Votes	%	±pp	Total	+/−
People's Party (PP)	159,521	43.41	+4.64	3	+1
Spanish Socialist Workers' Party (PSOE)	97,733	26.59	–1.16	2	±0
United We Can (Podemos–IU–Equo)^{1}	53,994	14.69	–2.48	1	±0
Citizens–Party of the Citizenry (C's)	47,705	12.98	–0.82	0	–1
Animalist Party Against Mistreatment of Animals (PACMA)	3,386	0.92	+0.13	0	±0
Vox (Vox)	1,013	0.28	–0.11	0	±0
Union, Progress and Democracy (UPyD)	695	0.19	–0.30	0	±0
Zero Cuts–Green Group (Recortes Cero–GV)	564	0.15	–0.01	0	±0
Communist Party of the Peoples of Spain (PCPE)	334	0.09	+0.01	0	±0
Spanish Phalanx of the CNSO (FE de las JONS)	330	0.09	New	0	±0
The Phalanx (FE)	254	0.07	New	0	±0
Blank ballots	1,974	0.54	–0.06		
Total	367,503			6	±0
Valid votes	367,503	98.83	+0.08		
Invalid votes	4,363	1.17	–0.08		
Votes cast / turnout	371,866	71.76	–3.48		
Abstentions	146,340	28.24	+3.48		
Registered voters	518,206				
Sources
Footnotes: ^{1} United We Can results are compared to the combined totals of We Can and United Left–Popular Unity in Common in the 2015 election.

=== 2015 ===
Summary of the 20 December 2015 Congress of Deputies election results in Toledo
Parties and alliances	Popular vote			Seats	
Parties and alliances	Votes	%	±pp	Total	+/−
People's Party (PP)	149,442	38.77	–18.50	2	–2
Spanish Socialist Workers' Party (PSOE)	106,988	27.75	–1.49	2	±0
Citizens–Party of the Citizenry (C's)	53,199	13.80	New	1	+1
We Can (Podemos)	52,587	13.64	New	1	+1
United Left–Popular Unity in Common (IU–UPeC)	13,590	3.53	–2.19	0	±0
Animalist Party Against Mistreatment of Animals (PACMA)	3,039	0.79	+0.41	0	±0
Union, Progress and Democracy (UPyD)	1,901	0.49	–4.47	0	±0
Vox (Vox)	1,509	0.39	New	0	±0
Zero Cuts–Green Group (Recortes Cero–GV)	612	0.16	New	0	±0
Communist Party of the Peoples of Spain (PCPE)	306	0.08	–0.08	0	±0
Blank ballots	2,325	0.60	–0.55		
Total	385,498			6	±0
Valid votes	385,498	98.75	+0.34		
Invalid votes	4,881	1.25	–0.34		
Votes cast / turnout	390,379	75.24	–0.83		
Abstentions	128,459	24.76	+0.83		
Registered voters	518,838				

=== 2011 ===
Summary of the 20 November 2011 Congress of Deputies election results in Toledo
Parties and alliances	Popular vote			Seats	
Parties and alliances	Votes	%	±pp	Total	+/−
People's Party (PP)	220,474	57.27	+6.03	4	+1
Spanish Socialist Workers' Party (PSOE)	112,568	29.24	–13.71	2	–1
United Left of Castilla–La Mancha–The Greens: Plural Left (IUCLM–LV)	22,373	5.81	+2.85	0	±0
Union, Progress and Democracy (UPyD)	19,089	4.96	+4.00	0	±0
Equo (Equo)	2,178	0.57	New	0	±0
Animalist Party Against Mistreatment of Animals (PACMA)	1,473	0.38	New	0	±0
Hartos.org (Hartos.org)	789	0.20	New	0	±0
Union of Independent Citizens of Toledo (UCIT)	785	0.20	New	0	±0
Communist Party of the Peoples of Spain (PCPE)	629	0.16	+0.11	0	±0
Communist Unification of Spain (UCE)	163	0.04	New	0	±0
Blank ballots	4,422	1.15	+0.37		
Total	384,943			6	±0
Valid votes	384,943	98.41	–0.85		
Invalid votes	6,211	1.59	+0.85		
Votes cast / turnout	391,154	76.07	–4.92		
Abstentions	123,054	23.93	+4.92		
Registered voters	514,208				

=== 2008 ===
Summary of the 9 March 2008 Congress of Deputies election results in Toledo
Parties and alliances	Popular vote			Seats	
Parties and alliances	Votes	%	±pp	Total	+/−
People's Party (PP)	201,166	51.24	+3.77	3	±0
Spanish Socialist Workers' Party (PSOE)	168,649	42.95	–3.55	3	+1
United Left–Alternative (IU)	11,626	2.96	–0.56	0	±0
Union, Progress and Democracy (UPyD)	3,775	0.96	New	0	±0
The Greens–Green Group (LV–GV)	1,004	0.26	New	0	±0
The Greens of Europe (LVdE)	763	0.19	New	0	±0
Social Democratic Party (PSD)	336	0.09	New	0	±0
Commoners' Land (TC)	250	0.06	–0.02	0	±0
Citizens for Blank Votes (CenB)	241	0.06	–0.09	0	±0
Spanish Phalanx of the CNSO (FE de las JONS)	227	0.06	+0.01	0	±0
Citizens–Party of the Citizenry (C's)	218	0.06	New	0	±0
For a Fairer World (PUM+J)	217	0.06	New	0	±0
Communist Party of the Peoples of Spain (PCPE)	215	0.05	–0.01	0	±0
National Democracy (DN)	162	0.04	±0.00	0	±0
Family and Life Party (PFyV)	158	0.04	–0.16	0	±0
Spanish Alternative (AES)	127	0.03	New	0	±0
Spanish Democratic Centre (CDEs)	110	0.03	New	0	±0
Authentic Phalanx (FA)	88	0.02	–0.01	0	±0
National Alliance (AN)	79	0.02	New	0	±0
Humanist Party (PH)	76	0.02	–0.07	0	±0
Spain 2000 (E–2000)	44	0.01	New	0	±0
Centrist Party (PCTR)	41	0.00	New	0	±0
Blank ballots	3,058	0.78	–0.60		
Total	392,630			6	+1
Valid votes	392,630	99.26	+0.12		
Invalid votes	2,929	0.74	–0.12		
Votes cast / turnout	395,559	80.99	+0.15		
Abstentions	92,829	19.01	–0.15		
Registered voters	488,388				

=== 2004 ===
Summary of the 14 March 2004 Congress of Deputies election results in Toledo
Parties and alliances	Popular vote			Seats	
Parties and alliances	Votes	%	±pp	Total	+/−
People's Party (PP)	171,325	47.47	–5.25	3	±0
Spanish Socialist Workers' Party (PSOE)	167,807	46.50	+6.25	2	±0
United Left–Left of Castilla–La Mancha (IU–ICAM)	12,707	3.52	–1.05	0	±0
Family and Life Party (PFyV)	725	0.20	New	0	±0
Democratic and Social Centre (CDS)	557	0.15	+0.05	0	±0
Citizens for Blank Votes (CenB)	530	0.15	New	0	±0
Humanist Party (PH)	322	0.09	–0.06	0	±0
Commoners' Land–Castilian Nationalist Party (TC–PNC)	284	0.08	–0.03	0	±0
Romantic Mutual Support Party (PMAR)	273	0.08	New	0	±0
Communist Party of the Peoples of Spain (PCPE)	208	0.06	New	0	±0
Spanish Phalanx of the CNSO (FE de las JONS)^{1}	193	0.05	+0.01	0	±0
The Phalanx (FE)	165	0.05	–0.01	0	±0
Republican Left (IR)	163	0.05	New	0	±0
National Democracy (DN)	159	0.04	New	0	±0
Internationalist Socialist Workers' Party (POSI)	152	0.04	New	0	±0
Spanish Democratic Party (PADE)	134	0.04	–0.03	0	±0
Authentic Phalanx (FA)	114	0.03	New	0	±0
Republican Social Movement (MSR)	88	0.02	New	0	±0
Blank ballots	4,998	1.38	+0.28		
Total	360,904			5	±0
Valid votes	360,904	99.14	–0.05		
Invalid votes	3,142	0.86	+0.05		
Votes cast / turnout	364,046	80.84	+3.26		
Abstentions	86,276	19.16	–3.26		
Registered voters	450,322				
Sources
Footnotes: ^{1} Spanish Phalanx of the CNSO results are compared to Independent Spanish Phalanx–Phalanx 2000 totals in the 2000 election.

=== 2000 ===
Summary of the 12 March 2000 Congress of Deputies election results in Toledo
Parties and alliances	Popular vote			Seats	
Parties and alliances	Votes	%	±pp	Total	+/−
People's Party (PP)	173,372	52.72	+4.47	3	±0
Spanish Socialist Workers' Party–Progressives (PSOE–p)	132,358	40.25	–1.52	2	±0
United Left (IU)	15,018	4.57	–3.62	0	±0
Liberal Independent Group (GIL)	1,518	0.46	New	0	±0
Humanist Party (PH)	488	0.15	+0.09	0	±0
Natural Law Party (PLN)	459	0.14	New	0	±0
Commoners' Land–Castilian Nationalist Party (TC–PNC)	367	0.11	+0.02	0	±0
Centrist Union–Democratic and Social Centre (UC–CDS)	318	0.10	–0.20	0	±0
Party of Self-employed, Retirees and Independents (EL–PAPI)	277	0.08	New	0	±0
Party of Self-employed, Retirees and Widows (PAE)	268	0.08	New	0	±0
Spanish Democratic Party (PADE)	224	0.07	New	0	±0
The Phalanx (FE)	199	0.06	New	0	±0
Spain 2000 Platform (ES2000)	166	0.05	New	0	±0
Independent Spanish Phalanx–Phalanx 2000 (FEI–FE 2000)	130	0.04	New	0	±0
Carlist Party (PC)	44	0.01	New	0	±0
Blank ballots	3,624	1.10	+0.30		
Total	328,830			5	±0
Valid votes	328,830	99.19	–0.14		
Invalid votes	2,699	0.81	+0.14		
Votes cast / turnout	331,529	77.58	–6.57		
Abstentions	95,797	22.42	+6.57		
Registered voters	427,326				

=== 1996 ===
Summary of the 3 March 1996 Congress of Deputies election results in Toledo
Parties and alliances	Popular vote			Seats	
Parties and alliances	Votes	%	±pp	Total	+/−
People's Party (PP)	164,313	48.25	+3.82	3	+1
Spanish Socialist Workers' Party (PSOE)	142,262	41.77	–2.83	2	–1
United Left–Left of Castilla–La Mancha (IU–ICAM)	27,904	8.19	+0.91	0	±0
Centrist Union (UC)	1,011	0.30	–1.45	0	±0
Red–Green Party (PRV)	680	0.20	New	0	±0
Regionalist Party of Castilla–La Mancha (PRCM)	642	0.19	New	0	±0
Authentic Spanish Phalanx (FEA)	329	0.10	New	0	±0
Commoners' Land–Castilian Nationalist Party (TC–PNC)	309	0.09	+0.03	0	±0
Humanist Party (PH)	214	0.06	+0.03	0	±0
Workers' Revolutionary Party (PRT)	194	0.06	New	0	±0
Blank ballots	2,720	0.80	+0.08		
Total	340,578			5	±0
Valid votes	340,578	99.33	–0.02		
Invalid votes	2,296	0.67	+0.02		
Votes cast / turnout	342,874	84.15	+0.70		
Abstentions	64,590	15.85	–0.70		
Registered voters	407,464				

=== 1993 ===
Summary of the 6 June 1993 Congress of Deputies election results in Toledo
Parties and alliances	Popular vote			Seats	
Parties and alliances	Votes	%	±pp	Total	+/−
Spanish Socialist Workers' Party (PSOE)	142,960	44.60	–2.38	3	±0
People's Party (PP)	142,403	44.43	+10.05	2	±0
United Left (IU)	23,324	7.28	–0.02	0	±0
Democratic and Social Centre (CDS)	5,607	1.75	–6.28	0	±0
The Greens (Verdes)	1,638	0.51	New	0	±0
The Ecologists (LE)	907	0.28	–0.25	0	±0
Ruiz-Mateos Group–European Democratic Alliance (ARM–ADE)	681	0.21	–0.51	0	±0
Commoners' Land–Castilian Nationalist Party (TC–PNC)	184	0.06	New	0	±0
Natural Law Party (PLN)	167	0.05	New	0	±0
Social Democratic Spanish Christian Monarchy (MCES)	137	0.04	New	0	±0
Coalition for a New Socialist Party (CNPS)^{1}	107	0.03	–0.02	0	±0
Humanist Party (PH)	101	0.03	–0.04	0	±0
Communist Unification of Spain (UCE)	0	0.00	New	0	±0
Blank ballots	2,305	0.72	+0.12		
Total	320,521			5	±0
Valid votes	320,521	99.35	+0.34		
Invalid votes	2,111	0.65	–0.34		
Votes cast / turnout	322,632	83.45	+5.37		
Abstentions	63,970	16.55	–5.37		
Registered voters	386,602				
Sources
Footnotes: ^{1} Coalition for a New Socialist Party results are compared to Alliance for the Republic totals in the 1989 election.

=== 1989 ===
Summary of the 29 October 1989 Congress of Deputies election results in Toledo
Parties and alliances	Popular vote			Seats	
Parties and alliances	Votes	%	±pp	Total	+/−
Spanish Socialist Workers' Party (PSOE)	135,526	46.98	+0.91	3	±0
People's Party (PP)^{1}	99,167	34.38	–1.04	2	±0
Democratic and Social Centre (CDS)	23,159	8.03	–2.79	0	±0
United Left (IU)	21,053	7.30	+2.59	0	±0
Ruiz-Mateos Group (Ruiz-Mateos)	2,070	0.72	New	0	±0
The Ecologist Greens (LVE)	1,520	0.53	New	0	±0
Spanish Vertex Ecological Development Revindication (VERDE)	1,143	0.40	New	0	±0
Workers' Socialist Party (PST)	884	0.31	+0.04	0	±0
Spanish Phalanx of the CNSO (FE–JONS)	589	0.20	–0.23	0	±0
Workers' Party of Spain–Communist Unity (PTE–UC)^{2}	500	0.17	–0.40	0	±0
Centrist Unity–Democratic Spanish Party (PED)	452	0.16	New	0	±0
Communist Party of the Peoples of Spain (PCPE)	331	0.11	New	0	±0
Humanist Party (PH)	202	0.07	New	0	±0
Alliance for the Republic (AxR)^{3}	148	0.05	–0.03	0	±0
Blank ballots	1,722	0.60	+0.05		
Total	288,466			5	±0
Valid votes	288,466	99.01	+0.62		
Invalid votes	2,873	0.99	–0.62		
Votes cast / turnout	291,339	78.08	+0.08		
Abstentions	81,780	21.92	–0.08		
Registered voters	373,119				
Sources
Footnotes: ^{1} People's Party results are compared to People's Coalition totals in the 1986 election.; ^{2} Workers' Party of Spain–Communist Unity results are compared to Communists' Unity Board totals in the 1986 election.; ^{3} Alliance for the Republic results are compared to Internationalist Socialist Workers' Party totals in the 1986 election.

=== 1986 ===
Summary of the 22 June 1986 Congress of Deputies election results in Toledo
Parties and alliances	Popular vote			Seats	
Parties and alliances	Votes	%	±pp	Total	+/−
Spanish Socialist Workers' Party (PSOE)	130,951	46.07	–1.04	3	±0
People's Coalition (AP–PDP–PL)^{1}	100,685	35.42	+1.92	2	±0
Democratic and Social Centre (CDS)	30,763	10.82	+9.00	0	±0
United Left (IU)^{2}	13,400	4.71	+0.33	0	±0
Democratic Reformist Party (PRD)	2,057	0.72	New	0	±0
Communists' Unity Board (MUC)	1,625	0.57	New	0	±0
Spanish Phalanx of the CNSO (FE–JONS)	1,228	0.43	+0.43	0	±0
Workers' Socialist Party (PST)	777	0.27	–0.09	0	±0
Communist Unification of Spain (UCE)	558	0.20	+0.13	0	±0
Republican Popular Unity (UPR)^{3}	416	0.15	+0.08	0	±0
Internationalist Socialist Workers' Party (POSI)	223	0.08	New	0	±0
Party of the Communists of Catalonia (PCC)	0	0.00	New	0	±0
Blank ballots	1,577	0.55	+0.21		
Total	284,260			5	±0
Valid votes	284,260	98.39	+0.73		
Invalid votes	4,657	1.61	–0.73		
Votes cast / turnout	288,917	78.00	–8.61		
Abstentions	81,492	22.00	+8.61		
Registered voters	370,409				
Sources
Footnotes: ^{1} People's Coalition results are compared to People's Alliance–People's Democratic Party totals in the 1982 election.; ^{2} United Left results are compared to Communist Party of Spain totals in the 1982 election.; ^{3} Republican Popular Unity results are compared to Communist Party of Spain (Marxist–Leninist) totals in the 1982 election.

=== 1982 ===
Summary of the 28 October 1982 Congress of Deputies election results in Toledo
Parties and alliances	Popular vote			Seats	
Parties and alliances	Votes	%	±pp	Total	+/−
Spanish Socialist Workers' Party (PSOE)	138,169	47.11	+15.01	3	+1
People's Alliance–People's Democratic Party (AP–PDP)^{1}	98,244	33.50	+27.88	2	+2
Union of the Democratic Centre (UCD)	28,433	9.69	–31.97	0	–3
Communist Party of Spain (PCE)	12,849	4.38	–6.52	0	±0
New Force (FN)^{2}	6,488	2.21	–5.09	0	±0
Democratic and Social Centre (CDS)	5,331	1.82	New	0	±0
Workers' Socialist Party (PST)	1,059	0.36	New	0	±0
Spanish Communist Workers' Party (PCOE)	559	0.19	New	0	±0
Falangist Movement of Spain (MFE)	332	0.11	New	0	±0
Spanish Solidarity (SE)	283	0.10	New	0	±0
Communist Party of Spain (Marxist–Leninist) (PCE (m–l))	204	0.07	New	0	±0
Communist Unification of Spain (UCE)	197	0.07	New	0	±0
Communist Unity Candidacy (CUC)	157	0.05	New	0	±0
Communist Movement (MC)	0	0.00	New	0	±0
Spanish Phalanx of the CNSO (FE–JONS)	0	0.00	New	0	±0
Revolutionary Communist League (LCR)	0	0.00	New	0	±0
Socialist Party (PS)^{3}	0	0.00	–0.66	0	±0
Blank ballots	997	0.34	+0.15		
Total	293,302			5	±0
Valid votes	293,302	97.66	–1.24		
Invalid votes	7,035	2.34	+1.24		
Votes cast / turnout	300,337	86.61	+8.77		
Abstentions	46,427	13.39	–8.77		
Registered voters	346,764				
Sources
Footnotes: ^{1} People's Alliance–People's Democratic Party results are compared to Democratic Coalition totals in the 1979 election.; ^{2} New Force results are compared to National Union totals in the 1979 election.; ^{3} Socialist Party results are compared to Spanish Socialist Workers' Party (historical) totals in the 1979 election.

=== 1979 ===
Summary of the 1 March 1979 Congress of Deputies election results in Toledo
Parties and alliances	Popular vote			Seats	
Parties and alliances	Votes	%	±pp	Total	+/−
Union of the Democratic Centre (UCD)	110,700	41.66	+3.34	3	+1
Spanish Socialist Workers' Party (PSOE)^{1}	85,288	32.10	–1.07	2	±0
Communist Party of Spain (PCE)	28,961	10.90	+2.65	0	±0
National Union (UN)^{2}	19,383	7.30	+4.80	0	±0
Democratic Coalition (CD)^{3}	14,933	5.62	–10.96	0	–1
Spanish Socialist Workers' Party (historical) (PSOEh)	1,753	0.66	New	0	±0
Party of Labour of Spain (PTE)^{4}	1,692	0.64	+0.14	0	±0
Workers' Revolutionary Organization (ORT)	1,421	0.53	New	0	±0
Spanish Phalanx of the CNSO (Authentic) (FE–JONS(A))	637	0.24	–0.30	0	±0
Authentic Spanish Phalanx (FEA)	433	0.16	New	0	±0
Blank ballots	499	0.19	+0.04		
Total	265,700			5	±0
Valid votes	265,700	98.90	–0.24		
Invalid votes	2,945	1.10	+0.24		
Votes cast / turnout	268,645	77.84	–8.80		
Abstentions	76,481	22.16	+8.80		
Registered voters	345,126				
Sources
Footnotes: ^{1} Spanish Socialist Workers' Party results are compared to the combined totals of Spanish Socialist Workers' Party and People's Socialist Party–Socialist Unity in the 1977 election.; ^{2} National Union results are compared to National Alliance July 18 totals in the 1977 election.; ^{3} Democratic Coalition results are compared to People's Alliance totals in the 1977 election.; ^{4} Party of Labour of Spain results are compared to Democratic Left Front totals in the 1977 election.

=== 1977 ===
Summary of the 15 June 1977 Congress of Deputies election results in Toledo
Parties and alliances	Popular vote			Seats	
Parties and alliances	Votes	%	±pp	Total	+/−
Union of the Democratic Centre (UCD)	101,891	38.32	n/a	2	n/a
Spanish Socialist Workers' Party (PSOE)	83,956	31.57	n/a	2	n/a
People's Alliance (AP)	44,091	16.58	n/a	1	n/a
Communist Party of Spain (PCE)	21,942	8.25	n/a	0	n/a
National Alliance July 18 (AN18)	6,656	2.50	n/a	0	n/a
People's Socialist Party–Socialist Unity (PSP–US)	4,253	1.60	n/a	0	n/a
Spanish Phalanx of the CNSO (Authentic) (FE–JONS(A))	1,427	0.54	n/a	0	n/a
Democratic Left Front (FDI)	1,320	0.50	n/a	0	n/a
Blank ballots	393	0.15	n/a		
Total	265,929			5	n/a
Valid votes	265,929	99.14	n/a		
Invalid votes	2,296	0.86	n/a		
Votes cast / turnout	268,225	86.64	n/a		
Abstentions	41,370	13.36	n/a		
Registered voters	309,595				

== Bibliography ==
- Ley 1/1977, de 4 de enero, para la Reforma Política (Fundamental Law 1/1977). Official State Gazette (in Spanish). 4 January 1977. BOE-A-1977-165.
- Real Decreto-ley 20/1977, de 18 de marzo, sobre Normas Electorales (Royal Decree-Law 20/1977). Official State Gazette (in Spanish). 18 March 1977. BOE-A-1977-7445.
- Constitución Española (Constitution). Official State Gazette (in Spanish). 27 December 1978. BOE-A-1978-31229.
- Ley Orgánica 5/1985, de 19 de junio, del Régimen Electoral General (Organic Law 5/1985). Official State Gazette (in Spanish). 19 June 1985. BOE-A-1985-11672.
- Carreras de Odriozola, Albert; Tafunell Sambola, Xavier (2005) [1989]. Estadísticas históricas de España, siglos XIX-XX (PDF) (in Spanish). Vol. 1 (II ed.). Bilbao: Fundación BBVA. pp. 1072–1097. ISBN 84-96515-00-1. Archived from the original (PDF) on 24 September 2015.
