= Communist Workers League (Spain) =

Communist Workers League Liga Obrera Comunista
- Founded: 1973
- Dissolved: 1999
- Headquarters: Madrid
- Newspaper: Prensa Obrera; Marxismo
- Ideology: Trotskyism
- Political position: Left-wing
- International affiliation: International Committee of the Fourth International

En lucha was also a Maoist publication by the Workers' Revolutionary Organisation.

Communist Workers League (in Spanish: Liga Obrera Comunista) was a Trotskyist group in Spain. It was founded in December 1973. The LOC was admitted as the Spanish section of the International Committee of the Fourth International in May 1974, during the Fifth World Congress of the International Committee of the Fourth International. It was included in the Spanish registry of political parties held by the Ministry of Interior on September 19, 1977.

LOC published Prensa Obrera 1976-1990.

The Communist Workers League had militants mainly in Barcelona. Its youth, the Socialist Revolutionary Youth, organized two marches against unemployment, one in 1977 and the other in 1978.

The Communist Workers League left the International Committee of the Fourth International on October 25, 1985, when they refused to attend a meeting duly summoned by the International Committee of the Fourth International: they argued that the meeting was not called by the leader of the British Workers Revolutionary Party whom they supported.

The Communist Workers League signed joining IC-Verds and United Left in 1991. As of this date there are no known public events as LOC but they continued publishing a magazine, "Marxismo", whose last issue appeared in March 1999.

The International Committee of the Fourth International hasn't had a section in Spain since 1985.
