= Falangist Movement of Spain =

Movimiento Falangista de España Falangist Movement of Spain
- Abbreviation: MFE
- Leader: Leoncio Calle Pila
- Founder: Antonio Jareño
- Founded: 1979
- Merger of: Frente de Unificación Falangista de Aragón; Unidad Falangista de León; Unidad Falangista Montañesa
- Headquarters: calle General Salinas, Santoña
- Ideology: Falangism; National syndicalism Spanish nationalism Third position
- Political position: Far-right
- Colors: Red Black

Party flag

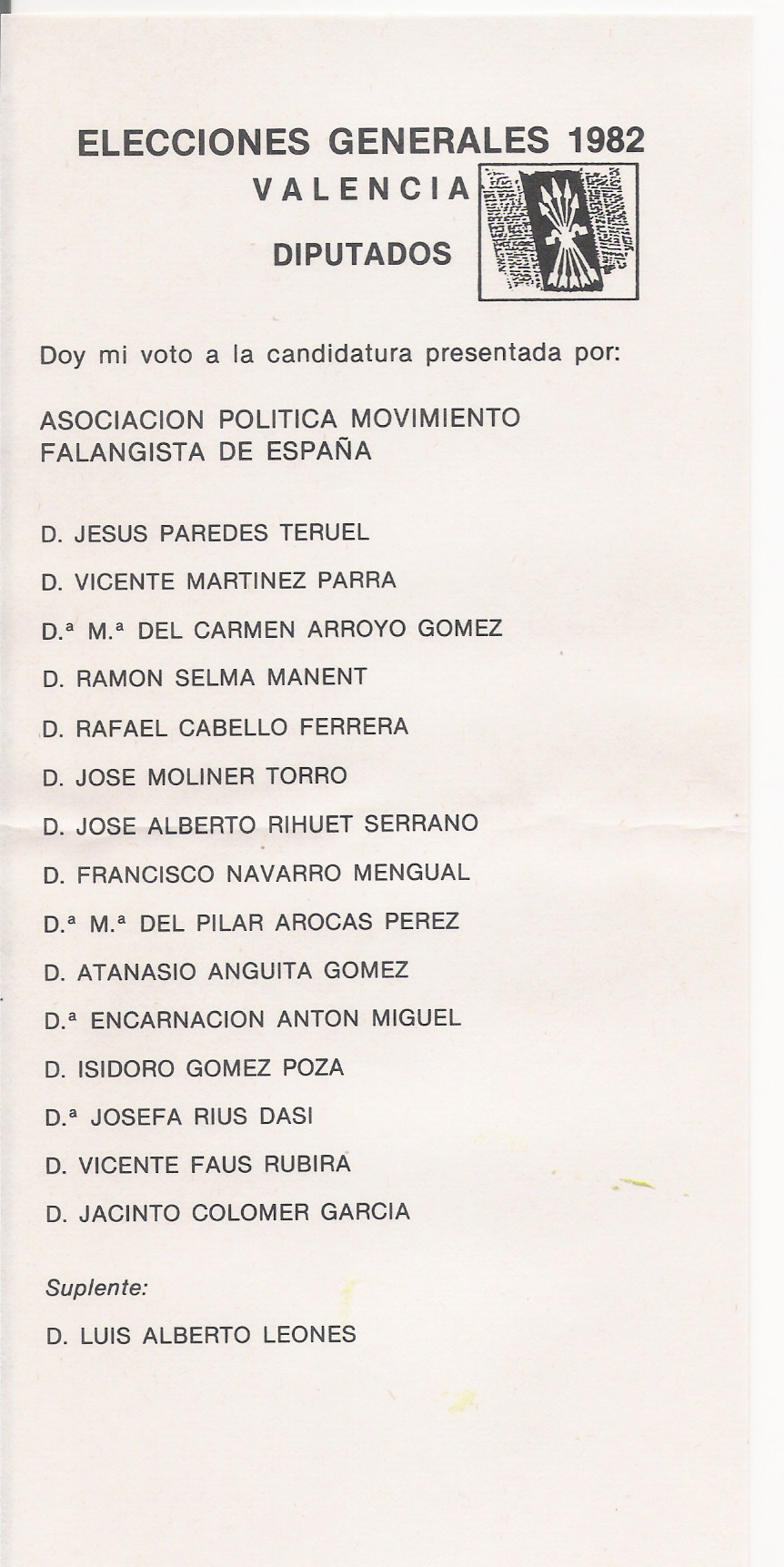
MFE ballot for the general elections of 1982.

Movimiento Falangista de España (Spanish for "Falangist Movement of Spain", MFE) is a Spanish political party registered in 1979. The party considers itself heir of classic (previous to 1936/1937) Falangism, openly rejecting Francoism, originating from a split of the Círculos Doctrinarios José Antonio, led by Antonio Jareño. Currently the party only has activity in Cantabria.

== History ==
The organization was formed in 1979, by several Falangist dissident organizations, especially former members of the Círculos Doctrinarios José Antonio (José Antonio Doctrine Circles) and some Spanish Independent Falange members. In the general elections of 1982 MFE gained 8,976 votes. In 1983 a section of the Youth Front joined the party. Since then the party has always achieved very poor election results, with some exceptions. The most notable of those exceptions is Santoña (Cantabria), where the party had 1 town councillor from 1999 to 2015, even participating in local governments with the People's Party and the Regionalist Party of Cantabria. The party finally lost its councillor in the local elections of 2015.

In 2006, the headquarters of the party were destroyed by an ETA bomb.

== See also ==
- FET-JONS
- Falange Española
- JONS

== Notes ==
- José Luis Rodríguez Jiménez; Reaccionarios y golpistas. La extrema derecha en España: del tardofranquismo a la consolidación de la democracia (1967-1982). Consejo Superior de Investigaciones Científicas, CSIC, 1994. ISBN 84-00-07442-4
