= National Union (Spain) =

National Union Unión Nacional
- President: Blas Piñar
- Founded: 1979
- Dissolved: 1982
- Merger of: Fuerza Nueva; FE de las JONS; Círculos Doctrinales José Antonio; Comunión Tradicionalista; Confederación Nacional de Excombatientes; Agrupación de Juventudes Tradicionalistas
- Ideology: Francoism; Falangism; Carlism; National Catholicism; Spanish nationalism Anticommunism
- Political position: Far-right
- Slogan: España en tus manos (Spain [is] in your hands)

National Union (Spanish: Unión nacional) was a Spanish far right electoral coalition which contested the 1979 Spanish general election. It linked Blas Piñar's Fuerza Nueva Francoist party with the Carlists.

The coalition gathered 378,964 votes (2.11%), which earned it one seat in Madrid, held by Piñar.

== Elections results ==
=== Cortes Generales ===
Election	Leader	Congress of Deputies					Senate		Rank	Government
Election	Leader	Votes	%	±pp	Seats won	+/−	Seats won	+/−	Rank	Government
1979	Blas Piñar	378,964	2.11%	▲	1 / 350	±0	—	—	#6	Opposition

== See also ==
- National Alliance July 18
