= Spanish Solidarity =

Spanish Solidarity Solidaridad Española
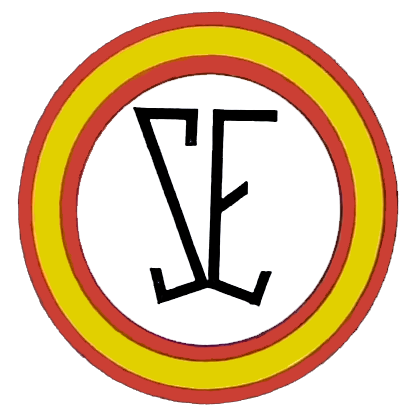
- President: Antonio Tejero
- Founded: August 18, 1982
- Dissolved: November 1984
- Merged into: Juntas Españolas
- Headquarters: Calle de Atocha, 90.1o., Madrid
- Ideology: Nationalism; Francoism
- Political position: Far-right

Spanish Solidarity (Spanish: Solidaridad Española, SE) was a Spanish far-right political party founded by former Civil Guard Lieutenant Colonel Antonio Tejero while in prison for his role in the failed 1981 Spanish coup. The party presented candidates to both houses of parliament for the 1982 general elections; its objective was to pass an act granting Tejero the necessary parliamentary immunity to avoid facing military criminal proceedings. Its president was Tejero himself, while the vice-presidents were Ángel López-Montero Juárez, Carlos Fernández Barallobre and María Jesús González de Castejón Moreno.

Using the slogan "Enter the Parliament with Tejero!" (Spanish: ¡Entra el Parlamento con Tejero!), it appeared on the ballot in some electoral districts, obtaining 28,451 votes, or 0.14% nationwide, and failed to obtain any deputy or senator seats. Following its disappointing results, the party disappeared in November 1984 when it merged with the Juntas Españolas party.
