= Opinion polling for the 1986 Spanish general election =

In the run up to the 1986 Spanish general election, various organisations carried out opinion polling to gauge voting intention in Spain during the term of the 2nd Cortes Generales. Results of such polls are displayed in this article. The date range for these opinion polls is from the previous general election, held on 28 October 1982, to the day the next election was held, on 22 June 1986.

Voting intention estimates refer mainly to a hypothetical Congress of Deputies election. Polls are listed in reverse chronological order, showing the most recent first and using the dates when the survey fieldwork was done, as opposed to the date of publication. Where the fieldwork dates are unknown, the date of publication is given instead. The highest percentage figure in each polling survey is displayed with its background shaded in the leading party's colour. If a tie ensues, this is applied to the figures with the highest percentages. The "Lead" columns on the right shows the percentage-point difference between the parties with the highest percentages in a poll.

== Electoral polling ==
=== Nationwide polling ===
==== Voting intention estimates ====
The table below lists nationwide voting intention estimates. Refusals are generally excluded from the party vote percentages, while question wording and the treatment of "don't know" responses and those not intending to vote may vary between polling organisations. When available, seat projections determined by the polling organisations are displayed below (or in place of) the percentages in a smaller font; 176 seats were required for an absolute majority in the Congress of Deputies.

Color key:

Exit poll

Polling firm/Commissioner	Fieldwork date	Sample size	Turnout	PSOE	AP–PDP–PL	UCD	PCE	CiU	CDS	PNV	HB	ERC	EE	PA	PRD	CG	MUC	IU	Lead
1986 general election	22 Jun 1986	—N/a	70.5	44.1; 184	26.0; 105	–	(Note: Within IU.)	5.0; 18	9.2; 19	1.5; 6	1.1; 5	0.4; 0	0.5; 2	0.5; 0	1.0; 0	0.4; 1	1.1; 0	4.6; 7	18.1
COPE	22 Jun 1986	?	?	? 170/180	? 100/110	–		? 15/20	? 15/20	? 7/9	? 6/9			–	? 0/2	(Note: Within PRD)	? 1	? 10/16	?
Cadena SER	22 Jun 1986	?	?	? 187/193	? 91/96	–		? 17/19	? 17/19	? 7/8	? 5/6	? 1	? 2	–	? 0		? 1/2	? 8/10	?
Sofemasa/TV3	22 Jun 1986	30,000	?	? 184/196	? 85/91	–		? 17/18	? 18/24	? 6/7	? 7/8	? 1	? 4/5	–	? 0/2	? 1/2	? 1	? 12/13	?
RTVE	22 Jun 1986	300,000	68	? 189	? 86	–		? 17	? 12	? 8	? 7	? 1	? 2	–	–	? 1	? 1	? 12	?
ECO/Cadena SER	16 Jun 1986	?	?	40.2	25.5	–		–	9.9	–	–	–	–	–	4.0	–	1.3	5.7	14.7
Telemarket/PRD	14 Jun 1986	10,105	?	39.1; 174	22.2; 93	–		5.2; 18	5.4; 9	2.5; 10	0.8; 3	0.5; 1	0.5; 2	? 1	9.7; 24		? 1	5.0; 11	16.9
OTR–Press	14 Jun 1986	2,497	?	45.0– 47.0	18.0– 21.0	–			11.0– 14.0	1.0– 2.0	–	–	–	–	9.0– 11.0	–	–	6.0– 9.0	26.0– 27.0
Aresco/ABC	11–13 Jun 1986	2,505	71.1	39.9; 167/180	28.7; 105/121	–		4.5; 17/20	9.0; 13/19	1.8; 8/10	1.0; 3	0.3; 0	0.4; 1	–	3.2; 3/6	–	1.3; 0	7.4; 6/12	11.2
Emopública/Grupo 16	5–11 Jun 1986	6,081	71.9	45.5; 193/202	23.0; 83/90	–			10.8; 26/32	1.7; 6/7	1.3; 4/5	1.2; 1/2	1.0; 2	–	6.2; 14/16		1.2; 0	5.2; 7/8	22.5
ECO/Cadena SER	10 Jun 1986	1,326	?	40.2	26.3	–		4.8	9.6	1.8	1.1	–	0.6	–	3.7	–	1.3	6.0	13.9
Perfiles	9–10 Jun 1986	?	?	39.4	19.3	–		5.3	2.9	2.3	–	–	–	–	12.4	–	–	7.0	20.1
Gallup/Ya	2–9 Jun 1986	6,046	?	40.0; 167	24.0; 101	–		6.0; 20	9.0; 23	2.0; 9	1.0; 5	1.0; 1	1.0; 2	–	4.0; 6	1.0; 2	2.0; 0	6.0; 9	16.0
Demoscopia/El País	5–8 Jun 1986	5,200	70	41.0; 167/194	24.0; 86/105	–		6.0; 17/20	11.0; 15/29	3.0; 8/9	1.4; 3/4	1.0; 1	0.7; 1/2	0.4; 0	3.0; 3/4		0.3; 0	6.0; 10/16	17.0
Iope–Etmar/El Periódico	3–7 Jun 1986	7,209	72–76	42.4; 180	24.1; 98	–		4.7; 17	11.7; 30	1.7; 7	1.1; 4	0.6; 1	0.5; 1	–	2.8; 4		2.0; 1	4.9; 5	18.3
Line Staff/La Vanguardia	29 May–7 Jun 1986	8,871	74.3– 77.8	39.3– 45.0; 178/199	19.2– 23.7; 71/90	–		5.4– 5.7; 20/21	11.1– 14.0; 17/28	1.8– 1.9; 9/11	? 1/2	? 1	? 1/2	–	8.0– 9.2; 8/12	0.9– 1.0; 2/4	–	5.5– 7.6; 7/12	15.6– 25.8
Perfiles	2–3 Jun 1986	4,480	?	40.3	19.7	–		4.9	2.5	2.2	0.8	0.4	0.6	–	12.9	–	–	6.0	20.6
ECO/Cadena SER	2–3 Jun 1986	1,311	73	40.3	26.5	–		5.4	8.4	1.8	1.2	–	0.5	–	3.6	–	1.0	5.9	13.8
TC–Sigma Dos/Actualidad	30 May–2 Jun 1986	1,111	?	38.5; 170	26.5; 114	–		4.9; 19	8.7; 13	1.9; 8	1.0; 2	–	0.4 ?	–	4.7; 7	–	2.8; 0	6.6; 12	12.0
Perfiles	26–27 May 1986	4,265	?	40.2	23.1	–		4.6	2.8	2.0	0.5	0.4	0.3	–	12.8	–	–	5.3	17.1
Demoscopia/El País	24–27 May 1986	5,200	72	46.0; 194/210	25.0; 85/98	–		6.0; 16/17	8.0; 15/19	3.0; 8	1.0; 2/3	0.3; 0	0.7; 1/2	–	1.0; 1/2		–	6.0; 6/7	21.0
CIS	21–25 May 1986	5,615	?	46.5	25.5	–	–	–	6.0	–	–	–	–	–	–	–	–	4.4	21.0
Perfiles	19–20 May 1986	4,330	73.6	42.0	23.4	–		3.9	3.5	1.9	0.6	0.4	0.3	–	11.4	–	–	4.1	18.6
ECO/Cadena SER	19 May 1986	?	?	42.0	29.1	–		5.2	5.3	1.9	0.9	–	0.6	–	3.4	–	–	6.7	12.9
Typol/CP	16–18 May 1986	5,000	?	? 160	? 120/130	–		–	5.0; 6	–	–	–	–	–	5.8; 7/8	–	–	–	?
Sigma Dos/Actualidad	10–14 May 1986	1,111	?	38.4	25.8	–		4.5	7.2	1.9	1.0	–	0.4	–	4.9	–	–	8.4	12.6
Typol	24 Apr–10 May 1986	5,000	?	43.5	28.6	–			5.8	2.1	0.9	0.4	0.9	–	9.7	–	–	3.9	14.9
Emopública/Cambio 16	23–25 Apr 1986	1,200	?	44.3	27.7	–	7.4	3.8	6.5	0.8	0.9	–	1.0	–	6.0	–	–	–	16.6
Emopública/Cambio 16	4 Mar 1986	1,300	?	40.7	29.7	–	–	–	–	–	–	–	–	–	–	–	–	–	11.0
Emopública/Cambio 16	13 Jan 1986	?	?	43.0	27.1	–	–	–	–	–	–	–	–	–	–	–	–	–	15.9
Sofemasa/La Vanguardia	16 Nov–1 Dec 1985	1,849	?	50.5	19.8	–	7.4	3.8	4.0	2.3	–	–	–	0.8	1.5	–	–	–	30.7
AP	14 Nov 1985	6,500	?	40.0	32.5	–	4.0– 5.0	3.0	6.0– 7.0	2.0	–	–	–	–	1.0– 2.0	–	–	–	7.5
Iope–Etmar/Mediterráneo	5–23 Jul 1985	1,600	?	44.9	24.6	–	5.0	3.9	9.2	1.8	–	–	–	0.7	2.7	1.6	–	–	20.3
Sofemasa/CEOE	24 Jun–7 Jul 1985	23,000	?	46.0	28.0	–	–	–	5.6	–	–	–	–	–	<1.0	–	–	–	18.0
Typol/AP (Note: Undecided and/or abstentionists excluded.)	26 Jun 1985	2,580	?	41.4	31.7	–	4.4	3.1	6.1	2.2	–	–	–	–	4.5	–	–	–	9.7
Sigma Dos/Actualidad	4–11 Jun 1985	1,111	?	35.4	27.0	–	5.9	3.0	5.2	2.1	0.9	–	0.6	–	0.8	–	–	–	8.4
Sigma Dos/Actualidad	7–14 May 1985	?	?	33.7	25.9	–	6.1	2.9	5.1	1.9	1.0	–	0.5	–	1.3	–	–	–	7.8
Iope–Etmar/Mediterráneo	1 Mar–23 Apr 1985	1,800	?	47.4	25.2	–	4.1	4.6	7.5	1.8	–	–	–	1.2	1.8	0.2	–	–	22.2
ABC	10 Mar 1985	15,000	?	? 167	? 118	–	? 13	? 17	? 5	? 8	–	–	–	–	? 19	–	–	–	?
Iope–Etmar/Mediterráneo	15 Jan–6 Feb 1985	1,800	?	47.8	22.3	–	4.0	4.5	8.0	1.9	–	–	–	0.8	4.3	0.3	–	–	25.5
Iope–Etmar/Mediterráneo	14 Dec–20 Jan 1985	1,800	?	45.9	23.6	–	4.7	4.3	7.2	2.1	–	–	–	1.5	4.5	0.3	–	–	22.3
ECO/Cambio 16	11–14 Jan 1985	1,307	?	45.0	28.5	–	5.0	4.0	5.0	2.0	–	–	–	–	2.0	–	–	–	16.5
Gallup	11–30 Nov 1984	1,035	?	38.2	26.3	–	5.8	3.9	6.3	2.0	1.0	0.7	0.5	–	8.3	–	–	–	11.9
AP	31 Oct 1984	1,037	?	39.9	31.5	–	6.9	–	2.5	–	–	–	–	–	–	–	–	–	8.4
TC/Actualidad	22–28 Oct 1984	1,111	?	39.2; 172	29.4; 132	–	7.2; 14	4.0; 16	4.0; 4	1.9; 8	? 2	? 1	–	? 1	–	–	–	–	9.8
Gallup	22 Sep–9 Oct 1984	1,024	?	42.9	28.0	–	5.9	3.1	5.7	2.3	0.9	0.7	0.6	–	5.2	–	–	–	14.9
Iope–Etmar/Mediterráneo	14 Sep–8 Oct 1984	1,852	?	44.8	24.4	–	5.0	5.0	7.7	1.8	–	–	–	0.9	2.9	0.6	–	–	20.4
TC/Actualidad	17–23 Sep 1984	?	?	37.1	28.2	–	5.6	3.0	3.6	1.9	0.8	–	0.6	–	–	–	–	–	8.9
TC/Actualidad	30 Jul–5 Aug 1984	1,111	?	40.6	30.4	–	6.5	3.1	3.5	2.0	0.7	–	0.5	–	–	–	–	–	10.2
ECO/Cambio 16	28 Jul 1984	?	?	41.1	31.6	–	–	–	–	–	–	–	–	–	–	–	–	–	9.5
TC/Actualidad	9–15 Jul 1984	?	?	44.3	27.4	–	4.9	3.1	2.4	2.0	1.0	–	0.6	–	–	–	–	–	16.9
TC/Actualidad	18–24 Jun 1984	?	?	42.0	29.4	–	5.4	3.0	3.5	2.0	0.8	–	0.6	–	–	–	–	–	12.6
Gallup	12–24 Mar 1984	1,031	?	42.3	27.1	–	6.1	3.7	5.3	1.9	1.0	1.0	0.6	–	–	–	–	–	15.2
Iope–Etmar/Mediterráneo	2–27 Nov 1983	2,200	?	47.5	26.9	–	4.4	4.3	4.6	1.9	–	–	–	0.5	3.1	–	–	–	20.6
1983 local elections	8 May 1983	—N/a	66.9	43.0	26.4	–	8.2	4.2	1.8	2.2	0.9	0.5	0.4	0.6	0.8	–	–	–	21.7
Aresco/ABC	26–29 Apr 1983	1,440	69.1	45.3	30.2	–	5.3	3.8	1.6	2.4	–	–	–	–	0.7	–	–	–	15.1
Metra Seis/Tiempo	11–15 Apr 1983	1,111	?	49.9	17.6	–	4.2	–	1.3	–	–	–	–	–	–	–	–	–	32.3
Alef/Grupo 16	21–26 Feb 1983	1,700	?	49.7	17.9	–	3.3	2.9	1.3	1.2	0.8	0.7	0.6	–	–	–	–	–	31.8
Metra Seis/Agencia Lid	22–24 Feb 1983	1,002	?	50.6	15.7	2.2	3.3	2.0	0.5	1.2	0.6	–	0.5	–	–	–	–	–	34.9
1982 general election	28 Oct 1982	—N/a	80.0	48.1; 202	26.4; 107	6.8; 11	4.1; 4	3.7; 12	2.9; 2	1.9; 8	1.0; 2	0.7; 1	0.5; 1	0.4; 0	–	–	–	–	16.6

==== Voting preferences ====
The table below lists raw, unweighted voting preferences.

Color key:

Poll conducted after legal ban on opinion polls

Polling firm/Commissioner	Fieldwork date	Sample size	PSOE	AP–PDP–PL	UCD	PCE	CiU	CDS	PNV	HB	PRD	PTE–UC	IU	Question	X mark	Lead
1986 general election (Note: Does not include non-resident citizens.)	22 Jun 1986	—N/a	30.8	18.1	–		3.5	6.4	1.1	0.8	0.7	0.8	3.2	—N/a	29.1	12.7
CIS	20 Jun 1986	2,146	36.0	14.0	–		4.0	8.0	1.0	–	1.0	1.0	3.0	24.0	4.0	22.0
CIS	17 Jun 1986	1,201	34.0	14.0	–		4.0	10.0	2.0	–	1.0	1.0	3.0	22.0	5.0	20.0
OTR–Press	14 Jun 1986	2,497	30.0– 33.0	12.0– 15.0	–			7.0– 10.0	–	–	5.0	–	4.0– 6.0	–	–	18.0
CIS	13 Jun 1986	5,601	37.0	13.0	–		3.0	8.0	1.0	–	1.0	1.0	3.0	26.0	5.0	24.0
CIS	9 Jun 1986	1,193	36.0	12.0	–		4.0	6.0	1.0	–	1.0	1.0	2.0	31.0	4.0	24.0
Gallup/Ya	2–9 Jun 1986	6,046	29.2	16.6	–		2.4	7.7	1.3	0.8	2.1	1.3	3.3	21.0	10.6	12.6
Demoscopia/El País	5–8 Jun 1986	5,200	24.0	8.0	–		2.0	5.0	1.0	1.0	0.5	–	4.0	47.0	4.0	16.0
Iope–Etmar/El Periódico	3–7 Jun 1986	7,209	38.9	20.7	–		3.9	10.0	1.5	1.1	1.7	1.9	4.4	12.1	–	18.2
Line Staff/La Vanguardia	29 May–7 Jun 1986	8,871	23.2	12.0	–		3.3	4.5	1.2	–	3.5	–	3.4	35.5	10.6	11.2
CIS	5 Jun 1986	3,932	38.0	12.0	–		3.0	6.0	1.0	–	1.0	1.0	3.0	27.0	5.0	26.0
OTR/Tiempo	4 Jun 1986	1,200	32.0	10.0	–			6.0	–	–	6.0	3.2	4.0	25.0	–	22.0
CIS	29 May 1986	5,340	33.0	12.0	–		3.0	7.0	1.0	–	1.0	1.0	3.0	31.0	6.0	21.0
CIS	21–25 May 1986	5,615	36.0	10.0	–		4.0	5.0	1.0	–	1.0	1.0	3.0	30.0	5.0	26.0
CIS	15 May 1986	4,429	34.0	11.0	–		3.0	5.0	1.0	–	1.0	1.0	4.0	31.0	6.0	23.0
CIS	8 May 1986	4,958	33.0	10.0	–	3.0	1.0	4.0	1.0	–	2.0	–	–	38.0	5.0	23.0
CIS	2 May 1986	25,667	32.0	9.0	–	4.0	1.0	3.0	1.0	–	1.0	–	–	39.0	5.0	23.0
CIS	16–17 Apr 1986	2,489	31.6	11.6	–	4.2	1.7	2.5	1.3	–	2.0	–	–	35.1	7.4	20.0
CIS	10–11 Mar 1986	1,188	33.0	10.0	–	3.0	2.0	3.0	1.0	1.0	2.0	–	–	36.0	6.0	23.0
CIS	7 Mar 1986	2,410	32.0	10.0	–	2.0	2.0	3.0	1.0	1.0	1.0	–	–	39.0	7.0	22.0
ECO/CIS	3–4 Mar 1986	2,500	35.2	12.6	–	4.1	4.1	3.5	0.7	0.5	1.1	–	–	23.5	10.4	22.6
CIS	1 Feb–1 Mar 1986	2,454	33.7	10.9	–	2.6	1.3	3.8	0.8	–	3.0	–	–	32.4	8.6	22.8
CIS	27 Feb 1986	?	30.0	11.0	–	3.0	2.0	4.0	1.0	1.0	1.0	–	–	36.0	7.0	19.0
CIS	15–19 Feb 1986	2,500	29.0	10.0	–	3.0	2.0	3.0	1.0	–	2.0	–	–	39.0	7.0	19.0
CIS	15 Feb 1986	?	31.0	11.0	–	3.0	2.0	4.0	1.0	–	2.0	–	–	37.0	8.0	20.0
CIS	10 Feb 1986	?	32.0	10.0	–	3.0	3.0	3.0	1.0	1.0	1.0	–	–	37.0	8.0	22.0
CIS	1 Feb 1986	2,493	31.5	12.4	–	2.1	1.3	3.0	0.9	–	2.0	–	–	34.6	9.6	19.1
CIS	18–25 Jan 1986	10,632	30.0	11.0	–	3.0	2.0	3.0	1.0	1.0	1.0	–	–	38.0	8.0	19.0
CIS	1 Jan 1986	?	31.0	9.0	–	3.0	3.0	3.0	1.0	–	1.0	–	–	39.0	8.0	22.0
CIS	18–24 Dec 1985	2,493	29.0	11.0	–	2.0	2.0	3.0	1.0	–	1.0	–	–	39.0	12.0	18.0
CIS	13–16 Dec 1985	2,457	30.0	11.0	–	2.0	2.0	3.0	1.0	–	1.0	–	–	37.0	9.0	19.0
Sofemasa/La Vanguardia	16 Nov–1 Dec 1985	1,849	26.5	10.4	–	3.9	2.0	2.1	1.2	–	0.8	–	–	30.9	13.5	16.1
AP	19 Nov 1985	?	29.0	22.3	–	–	–	–	–	–	–	–	–	26.7	–	6.7
CIS	10 Nov 1985	2,490	28.0	11.0	–	3.0	2.0	3.0	1.0	–	1.0	–	–	42.0	9.0	17.0
CIS	1 Nov 1985	12,319	31.4	10.5	–	2.3	1.6	4.0	0.6	–	1.0	–	–	37.1	8.9	20.9
CIS	10 Oct 1985	1,199	31.0	11.0	–	3.0	1.0	3.0	2.0	–	1.0	–	–	37.0	9.0	20.0
CIS	1 Oct 1985	1,232	32.1	11.0	–	4.0	1.7	4.0	1.3	–	1.0	–	–	34.3	8.7	21.1
CIS	10–13 Sep 1985	2,581	31.1	15.8	–	3.3	3.8	5.4	1.2	0.7	2.2	–	–	20.2	13.0	15.3
OTR	11 Aug 1985	2,490	29.4	14.2	–	2.4	–	8.7	–	–	(Note: Within CDS.)	–	–	41.1	11.9	15.2
Iope–Etmar/Mediterráneo	5–23 Jul 1985	1,600	30.9	12.5	–	3.4	1.9	5.0	0.9	–	1.9	–	–	38.5	–	18.4
CIS	17–20 Jul 1985	2,479	30.6	11.6	–	2.9	2.5	3.6	1.5	0.7	1.0	–	–	34.8	8.4	19.0
CIS	9–11 Jul 1985	2,489	28.0	11.0	–	4.0	2.0	3.0	1.0	–	–	–	–	38.0	11.0	17.0
CIS	7–11 Jun 1985	3,435	30.9	10.4	–	3.3	1.9	2.6	1.0	–	1.0	–	–	37.0	9.6	20.5
CIS	1–5 Jun 1985	2,489	27.2	11.2	–	3.5	1.9	3.9	0.9	0.2	0.6	–	–	38.8	9.5	16.0
CIS	1 May–1 Jun 1985	2,498	32.4	11.7	–	3.4	3.0	3.8	1.3	0.4	1.4	–	–	34.0	6.4	20.7
CIS	1 May 1985	2,484	27.8	10.4	–	2.9	2.9	3.7	0.9	0.6	0.7	–	–	38.2	9.8	17.4
Iope–Etmar/Mediterráneo	1 Mar–23 Apr 1985	1,800	33.7	11.9	–	2.6	3.3	4.1	1.3	–	1.3	–	–	38.2	–	21.8
CIS	1–13 Apr 1985	2,485	32.4	12.4	–	2.5	2.6	3.6	0.7	–	1.0	–	–	33.3	8.3	20.0
CIS	13–18 Mar 1985	2,493	31.9	12.3	–	3.4	1.6	4.6	1.0	–	3.0	–	–	31.1	8.9	19.6
Iope–Etmar/Mediterráneo	15 Jan–6 Feb 1985	1,800	36.9	11.4	–	2.5	2.8	4.8	0.9	–	1.8	–	–	34.8	–	25.5
Iope–Etmar/Mediterráneo	14 Dec–20 Jan 1985	1,800	37.6	14.5	–	3.5	3.1	5.3	1.7	–	2.7	–	–	25.5	–	23.1
CIS	1 Jan 1985	2,688	34.5	13.7	–	3.5	2.2	3.1	1.1	0.5	2.7	–	–	29.2	7.4	20.8
CIS	20–30 Dec 1984	2,486	26.2	12.7	–	2.5	2.1	2.1	1.0	0.3	1.7	–	–	38.4	11.6	13.5
CIS	1 Dec 1984	2,505	31.2	12.9	–	4.0	3.4	3.7	1.3	0.6	1.2	–	–	24.5	13.3	18.3
CIS	1 Nov–1 Dec 1984	12,389	30.9	12.3	–	3.4	2.2	3.5	1.1	–	2.0	–	–	32.4	9.3	18.6
CIS	1 Nov 1984	2,244	30.7	14.3	–	3.9	3.5	2.2	1.6	0.8	0.8	–	–	22.6	14.7	16.4
Aresco/AP	31 Oct 1984	1,037	30.5	24.1	–	5.3	–	1.9	–	–	–	–	–	9.1	23.6	6.4
CIS	27–30 Oct 1984	2,491	25.7	11.2	–	2.5	3.4	2.6	1.3	0.6	–	–	–	41.0	9.8	14.5
Servicio de Estudios/El País	22–24 Oct 1984	2,000	36.0	14.9	0.5	4.6	2.4	3.2	1.8	–	–	–	–	32.8		21.1
Iope–Etmar/Mediterráneo	14 Sep–8 Oct 1984	1,852	35.5	12.9	–	4.1	4.0	4.8	1.2	–	2.1	–	–	29.0	–	22.6
CIS	10 Sep 1984	?	34.9	15.1	–	4.8	4.7	2.3	2.1	1.1	0.4	–	–	15.5	13.5	19.8
CIS	1 Sep 1984	2,466	26.5	11.6	–	3.9	2.9	2.2	0.9	–	–	–	–	39.4	9.8	14.9
CIS	23–26 Jul 1984	2,461	25.1	11.8	–	3.7	3.3	2.1	1.1	0.4	–	–	–	39.1	11.2	13.3
CIS	1 Jul 1984	2,483	29.4	10.6	–	3.9	2.9	1.9	1.5	0.5	–	–	–	37.2	9.9	18.8
CIS	1 May 1984	2,481	28.5	11.9	–	3.5	3.7	3.0	1.2	–	–	–	–	36.3	8.5	16.6
CIS	25–28 Apr 1984	2,474	29.7	13.1	–	2.9	2.6	2.1	1.1	–	0.5	–	–	35.0	10.8	16.6
CIS	1 Mar 1984	2,484	26.6	10.6	–	2.8	2.5	1.1	1.0	–	–	–	–	44.2	8.4	16.0
CIS	1 Feb–1 Mar 1984	2,595	29.5	11.3	–	2.8	2.0	1.7	1.2	0.5	0.3	–	–	40.8	8.3	18.2
CIS	1 Jan–1 Feb 1984	2,948	28.2	13.6	–	2.7	1.5	1.7	1.4	–	–	–	–	37.7	9.7	14.6
CIS	30 Dec–3 Jan 1984	2,489	32.5	11.2	–	2.6	2.7	1.6	1.0	–	–	–	–	38.2	7.5	21.3
CIS	1 Jan 1984	2,495	33.8	10.8	–	3.3	1.4	1.3	1.1	0.3	0.6	–	–	37.3	8.0	23.0
CIS	1 Nov–1 Dec 1983	11,077	36.0	11.0	–	4.0	2.0	1.0	1.0	–	–	–	–	34.0	9.0	25.0
Iope–Etmar/Mediterráneo	2–27 Nov 1983	2,200	34.5	15.9	–	2.4	3.1	3.0	1.2	–	2.1	–	–	33.0	–	18.6
Sofemasa/El País	16–22 Nov 1983	3,000	37.4	18.7	1.2	4.7	2.1	1.1	1.6	–	–	–	–	27.7		18.7
CIS	9–13 Nov 1983	2,476	33.1	13.9	–	3.4	1.6	1.1	1.7	–	–	–	–	34.1	7.6	19.2
CIS	16 May 1983	3,368	45.4	16.2	–	3.9	2.0	1.8	1.3	0.6	0.2	–	–	20.7	4.9	29.2
CIS	1 Mar 1983	2,488	40.0	13.0	–	3.0	3.0	4.0	1.0	1.0	–	–	–	29.0	5.0	27.0
Metra Seis/Agencia Lid	22–24 Feb 1983	1,002	38.4	10.8	1.1	2.2	1.3	0.3	1.1	0.6	–	–	–	36.0	8.1	27.6
CIS	1 Nov 1982	2,394	39.8	11.1	3.2	2.4	2.3	1.2	1.5	0.5	–	–	–	32.0	3.2	28.7
1982 general election	28 Oct 1982	—N/a	37.7	20.7	5.3	3.2	2.9	2.3	1.5	0.8	–	–	–	—N/a	20.0	17.0

==== Victory preference ====
The table below lists opinion polling on the victory preferences for each party in the event of a general election taking place.

Color key:

Poll conducted after legal ban on opinion polls

Polling firm/Commissioner	Fieldwork date	Sample size	PSOE	AP–PDP–PL	PCE	CiU	CDS	PNV	PRD	PTE–UC	IU	Other/ None	Question	Lead
CIS	20 Jun 1986	2,146	42.0	15.0	–	4.0	10.0	1.0	1.0	1.0	3.0	2.0	21.0	27.0
CIS	17 Jun 1986	1,201	38.0	15.0	–	4.0	12.0	1.0	1.0	1.0	2.0	2.0	24.0	23.0
CIS	13 Jun 1986	5,601	42.0	14.0	–	3.0	9.0	1.0	1.0	1.0	3.0	2.0	24.0	28.0
CIS	9 Jun 1986	1,193	40.0	14.0	–	4.0	8.0	–	2.0	1.0	2.0	2.0	28.0	26.0
CIS	5 Jun 1986	3,932	43.0	13.0	–	4.0	8.0	–	1.0	1.0	3.0	2.0	25.0	30.0
CIS	29 May 1986	5,340	39.0	13.0	–	4.0	9.0	1.0	2.0	1.0	4.0	2.0	25.0	26.0
CIS	21–25 May 1986	5,615	40.0	11.0	–	4.0	6.0	–	2.0	1.0	4.0	2.0	31.0	29.0
CIS	15 May 1986	4,429	38.0	12.0	–	4.0	7.0	1.0	2.0	1.0	4.0	2.0	29.0	26.0
CIS	8 May 1986	4,958	43.0	13.0	3.0	3.0	6.0	–	4.0	–	–	3.0	17.0	30.0
CIS	2 May 1986	25,667	45.0	11.0	5.0	–	3.0	–	–	–	–	2.0	34.0	34.0
CIS	16–17 Apr 1986	2,489	39.0	14.0	4.0	1.0	4.0	–	3.0	–	–	–	32.0	25.0

==== Victory likelihood ====
The table below lists opinion polling on the perceived likelihood of victory for each party in the event of a general election taking place.

Color key:

Poll conducted after legal ban on opinion polls

Polling firm/Commissioner	Fieldwork date	Sample size	PSOE	AP–PDP–PL	PCE	CDS	PRD	IU	Other/ None	Question	Lead
CIS	20 Jun 1986	2,146	70.0	5.0	–	2.0	–	–	–	23.0	65.0
CIS	17 Jun 1986	1,201	71.0	6.0	–	2.0	–	–	–	21.0	65.0
CIS	13 Jun 1986	5,601	72.0	5.0	–	1.0	–	–	–	20.0	67.0
CIS	9 Jun 1986	1,193	74.0	3.0	–	1.0	–	–	–	21.0	71.0
Line Staff/La Vanguardia	29 May–7 Jun 1986	8,871	75.0	5.0	–	1.1	0.7	0.4	0.2	17.6	70.0
CIS	5 Jun 1986	3,932	72.0	4.0	–	1.0	–	–	–	23.0	68.0
CIS	21–25 May 1986	5,615	65.0	5.0	–	–	–	–	–	30.0	60.0
CIS	15 May 1986	4,429	65.0	4.0	–	–	1.0	–	1.0	29.0	61.0
CIS	8 May 1986	4,958	67.0	4.0	–	–	–	–	1.0	28.0	63.0
CIS	2 May 1986	25,667	61.0	4.0	–	–	–	–	–	35.0	57.0
CIS	16–17 Apr 1986	2,489	59.0	6.0	1.0	1.0	–	–	–	33.0	53.0

==== Senate projections ====
Polling firm/Commissioner	Fieldwork date	Sample size	PSOE	AP–PDP–PL	UCD	CiU	CDS	PNV	HB
1986 general election	22 Jun 1986	—N/a	124	63	–	8	3	7	1
Demoscopia/El País	5–8 Jun 1986	5,200	117/129	55/66	–	6/8	4	7	1
Demoscopia/El País	24–27 May 1986	5,200	128/140	50/62	–	6/8	3/5	5/7	–
1982 general election	28 Oct 1982	—N/a	134	54	4	5	0	7	0

== Leadership polling ==
=== Preferred prime minister ===
The table below lists opinion polling on leader preferences to become prime minister.

==== All candidates ====
Color key:

Poll conducted after legal ban on opinion polls

Polling firm/Commissioner	Fieldwork date	Sample size							Other/ None/ Not care	Question	Lead
Polling firm/Commissioner	Fieldwork date	Sample size	González PSOE	Guerra PSOE	Fraga AP	Iglesias IU	Roca CiU/PRD	Suárez CDS	Other/ None/ Not care	Question	Lead
CIS	20 Jun 1986	2,146	41.0	–	15.0	3.0	7.0	14.0	–	20.0	26.0
CIS	17 Jun 1986	1,201	41.0	–	15.0	3.0	6.0	15.0	–	20.0	26.0
CIS	13 Jun 1986	5,601	46.0	–	14.0	3.0	5.0	12.0	–	20.0	32.0
CIS	9 Jun 1986	1,193	43.0	–	13.0	2.0	7.0	11.0	–	24.0	30.0
Demoscopia/El País	5–8 Jun 1986	5,200	37.3	–	9.2	–	3.7	11.6	38.2		25.7
Line Staff/La Vanguardia	29 May–7 Jun 1986	8,871	38.0	1.0	10.4	1.1	9.8	14.9	7.2	17.6	23.1
CIS	5 Jun 1986	3,932	46.0	–	13.0	3.0	6.0	11.0	–	21.0	33.0
ECO/Cadena SER	2–3 Jun 1986	1,311	36.0	–	13.2	–	10.1	15.8	–	–	20.2
CIS	29 May 1986	5,340	42.0	–	13.0	3.0	7.0	15.0	–	20.0	27.0
CIS	21–25 May 1986	5,615	44.0	–	11.0	4.0	8.0	10.0	–	24.0	33.0
ECO/Cadena SER	19 May 1986	?	41.0	–	13.5	–	12.1	11.8	–	–	27.5
CIS	15 May 1986	4,429	43.0	–	12.0	4.0	8.0	11.0	–	22.0	31.0
CIS	1 Feb–1 Mar 1986	2,454	45.0	–	12.0	3.0	7.0	9.0	1.0	23.0	33.0
Iope–Etmar/Mediterráneo	19–23 Apr 1985	900	42.0	–	14.0	2.0	11.0	13.0	3.0	16.0	28.0
ECO/Cambio 16	11–14 Jan 1985	1,307	43.0	–	16.0	–	8.0	17.0	–	–	26.0

==== González vs. Guerra ====
Polling firm/Commissioner	Fieldwork date	Sample size			Other/ None/ Not care	Question	Lead
Polling firm/Commissioner	Fieldwork date	Sample size	González PSOE	Guerra PSOE	Other/ None/ Not care	Question	Lead
CIS	8 May 1986	4,958	67.0	7.0	–	26.0	60.0
CIS	1 Feb–1 Mar 1986	2,454	60.0	5.0	–	35.0	55.0
CIS	13–18 Mar 1985	2,493	59.0	8.0	–	33.0	51.0
CIS	1 Jan–1 Feb 1984	2,948	58.0	7.0	–	35.0	51.0
CIS	16 May 1983	3,368	59.8	10.9	–	29.3	48.9
CIS	1 May 1983	2,495	69.0	9.0	–	22.0	60.0

==== González vs. Fraga ====
Polling firm/Commissioner	Fieldwork date	Sample size			Other/ None/ Not care	Question	Lead
Polling firm/Commissioner	Fieldwork date	Sample size	González PSOE	Fraga AP	Other/ None/ Not care	Question	Lead
CIS	8 May 1986	4,958	62.0	17.0	–	21.0	45.0
CIS	1 Feb–1 Mar 1986	2,454	57.0	15.0	–	28.0	42.0
CIS	13–18 Mar 1985	2,493	57.0	17.0	–	26.0	40.0
Iope–Etmar/Mediterráneo	14–19 Dec 1984	900	59.0	20.0	–	21.0	39.0
CIS	1 Jan–1 Feb 1984	2,948	55.0	18.0	–	27.0	37.0
Emopública/PSOE	30 Nov 1983	?	59.0	19.0	10.0	12.0	40.0
CIS	16 May 1983	3,368	61.5	19.1	–	19.5	42.4
CIS	1 May 1983	2,495	65.0	20.0	–	15.0	45.0

==== González vs. Iglesias ====
Polling firm/Commissioner	Fieldwork date	Sample size			Other/ None/ Not care	Question	Lead
Polling firm/Commissioner	Fieldwork date	Sample size	González PSOE	Iglesias PCE/IU	Other/ None/ Not care	Question	Lead
Iope–Etmar/Mediterráneo	14–19 Dec 1984	900	73.0	7.0	–	20.0	66.0

==== González vs. Roca ====
Polling firm/Commissioner	Fieldwork date	Sample size			Other/ None/ Not care	Question	Lead
Polling firm/Commissioner	Fieldwork date	Sample size	González PSOE	Roca CiU/PRD	Other/ None/ Not care	Question	Lead
CIS	8 May 1986	4,958	59.0	18.0	–	23.0	41.0
CIS	1 Feb–1 Mar 1986	2,454	54.0	16.0	–	30.0	38.0
CIS	13–18 Mar 1985	2,493	53.0	15.0	–	32.0	38.0
Iope–Etmar/Mediterráneo	14–19 Dec 1984	900	56.0	20.0	–	24.0	36.0
CIS	1 Jan–1 Feb 1984	2,948	55.0	11.0	–	34.0	44.0
CIS	16 May 1983	3,368	60.5	11.6	–	28.0	48.9
CIS	1 May 1983	2,495	64.0	12.0	–	24.0	52.0

==== González vs. Suárez ====
Polling firm/Commissioner	Fieldwork date	Sample size			Other/ None/ Not care	Question	Lead
Polling firm/Commissioner	Fieldwork date	Sample size	González PSOE	Suárez CDS	Other/ None/ Not care	Question	Lead
CIS	8 May 1986	4,958	52.0	26.0	–	22.0	26.0
CIS	1 Feb–1 Mar 1986	2,454	49.0	21.0	–	30.0	28.0
CIS	13–18 Mar 1985	2,493	51.0	21.0	–	28.0	30.0
Iope–Etmar/Mediterráneo	14–19 Dec 1984	900	56.0	22.0	–	22.0	34.0
CIS	1 Jan–1 Feb 1984	2,948	55.0	15.0	–	30.0	40.0
CIS	16 May 1983	3,368	64.0	12.8	–	23.1	51.2
CIS	1 May 1983	2,495	66.0	16.0	–	17.0	50.0

==== González vs. Arzalluz ====
Polling firm/Commissioner	Fieldwork date	Sample size			Other/ None/ Not care	Question	Lead
Polling firm/Commissioner	Fieldwork date	Sample size	González PSOE	Arzalluz PNV	Other/ None/ Not care	Question	Lead
CIS	16 May 1983	3,368	61.6	3.1	–	35.4	58.5

==== Guerra vs. Fraga ====
Polling firm/Commissioner	Fieldwork date	Sample size			Other/ None/ Not care	Question	Lead
Polling firm/Commissioner	Fieldwork date	Sample size	Guerra PSOE	Fraga AP	Other/ None/ Not care	Question	Lead
CIS	8 May 1986	4,958	48.0	23.0	–	31.0	25.0
CIS	1 Feb–1 Mar 1986	2,454	41.0	20.0	–	39.0	21.0
CIS	13–18 Mar 1985	2,493	40.0	22.0	–	38.0	18.0
CIS	1 Jan–1 Feb 1984	2,948	39.0	23.0	–	38.0	16.0
CIS	16 May 1983	3,368	50.5	22.5	–	26.9	28.0
CIS	1 May 1983	2,495	51.0	27.0	–	22.0	24.0

==== Guerra vs. Roca ====
Polling firm/Commissioner	Fieldwork date	Sample size			Other/ None/ Not care	Question	Lead
Polling firm/Commissioner	Fieldwork date	Sample size	Guerra PSOE	Roca CiU/PRD	Other/ None/ Not care	Question	Lead
CIS	8 May 1986	4,958	39.0	28.0	–	33.0	11.0
CIS	1 Feb–1 Mar 1986	2,454	35.0	23.0	–	42.0	12.0
CIS	13–18 Mar 1985	2,493	37.0	22.0	–	41.0	15.0
CIS	1 Jan–1 Feb 1984	2,948	36.0	18.0	–	46.0	18.0
CIS	16 May 1983	3,368	46.8	17.2	–	36.0	29.6
CIS	1 May 1983	2,495	49.0	19.0	–	32.0	30.0

==== Guerra vs. Suárez ====
Polling firm/Commissioner	Fieldwork date	Sample size			Other/ None/ Not care	Question	Lead
Polling firm/Commissioner	Fieldwork date	Sample size	Guerra PSOE	Suárez CDS	Other/ None/ Not care	Question	Lead
CIS	8 May 1986	4,958	31.0	42.0	–	27.0	11.0
CIS	1 Feb–1 Mar 1986	2,454	29.0	36.0	–	35.0	7.0
CIS	13–18 Mar 1985	2,493	30.0	36.0	–	34.0	6.0
CIS	1 Jan–1 Feb 1984	2,948	34.0	28.0	–	38.0	6.0
CIS	16 May 1983	3,368	48.2	21.8	–	30.1	26.4
CIS	1 May 1983	2,495	48.0	28.0	–	24.0	20.0

==== Guerra vs. Arzalluz ====
Polling firm/Commissioner	Fieldwork date	Sample size			Other/ None/ Not care	Question	Lead
Polling firm/Commissioner	Fieldwork date	Sample size	Guerra PSOE	Arzalluz PNV	Other/ None/ Not care	Question	Lead
CIS	16 May 1983	3,368	46.9	5.7	–	47.4	41.2

==== Fraga vs. Roca ====
Polling firm/Commissioner	Fieldwork date	Sample size			Other/ None/ Not care	Question	Lead
Polling firm/Commissioner	Fieldwork date	Sample size	Fraga AP	Roca CiU/PRD	Other/ None/ Not care	Question	Lead
CIS	8 May 1986	4,958	19.0	42.0	–	39.0	23.0
CIS	1 Feb–1 Mar 1986	2,454	17.0	36.0	–	47.0	19.0
CIS	13–18 Mar 1985	2,493	20.0	34.0	–	46.0	14.0
CIS	1 Jan–1 Feb 1984	2,948	23.0	28.0	–	49.0	5.0
CIS	16 May 1983	3,368	23.0	26.1	–	50.8	3.1
CIS	1 May 1983	2,495	28.0	31.0	–	41.0	3.0

==== Fraga vs. Suárez ====
Polling firm/Commissioner	Fieldwork date	Sample size			Other/ None/ Not care	Question	Lead
Polling firm/Commissioner	Fieldwork date	Sample size	Fraga AP	Suárez CDS	Other/ None/ Not care	Question	Lead
CIS	8 May 1986	4,958	16.0	58.0	–	26.0	42.0
CIS	1 Feb–1 Mar 1986	2,454	15.0	50.0	–	35.0	35.0
CIS	13–18 Mar 1985	2,493	17.0	51.0	–	32.0	34.0
CIS	1 Jan–1 Feb 1984	2,948	22.0	39.0	–	39.0	17.0
CIS	16 May 1983	3,368	23.3	41.9	–	34.8	18.6
CIS	1 May 1983	2,495	27.0	47.0	–	26.0	20.0

==== Fraga vs. Arzalluz ====
Polling firm/Commissioner	Fieldwork date	Sample size			Other/ None/ Not care	Question	Lead
Polling firm/Commissioner	Fieldwork date	Sample size	Fraga AP	Arzalluz PNV	Other/ None/ Not care	Question	Lead
CIS	16 May 1983	3,368	23.5	13.4	–	63.1	10.1

==== Roca vs. Suárez ====
Polling firm/Commissioner	Fieldwork date	Sample size			Other/ None/ Not care	Question	Lead
Polling firm/Commissioner	Fieldwork date	Sample size	Roca CiU/PRD	Suárez CDS	Other/ None/ Not care	Question	Lead
CIS	8 May 1986	4,958	21.0	50.0	–	19.0	29.0
CIS	1 Feb–1 Mar 1986	2,454	18.0	41.0	–	41.0	23.0
CIS	13–18 Mar 1985	2,493	17.0	45.0	–	38.0	28.0
CIS	1 Jan–1 Feb 1984	2,948	18.0	36.0	–	46.0	18.0
CIS	16 May 1983	3,368	19.6	34.8	–	45.5	15.2
CIS	1 May 1983	2,495	21.0	42.0	–	36.0	21.0

==== Roca vs. Arzalluz ====
Polling firm/Commissioner	Fieldwork date	Sample size			Other/ None/ Not care	Question	Lead
Polling firm/Commissioner	Fieldwork date	Sample size	Roca CiU/PRD	Arzalluz PNV	Other/ None/ Not care	Question	Lead
CIS	16 May 1983	3,368	22.4	7.8	–	69.8	14.6

==== Suárez vs. Arzalluz ====
Polling firm/Commissioner	Fieldwork date	Sample size			Other/ None/ Not care	Question	Lead
Polling firm/Commissioner	Fieldwork date	Sample size	Suárez CDS	Arzalluz PNV	Other/ None/ Not care	Question	Lead
CIS	16 May 1983	3,368	37.9	7.5	–	54.6	30.4

=== Approval ratings ===
==== Felipe González ====
Polling firm/Commissioner	Fieldwork date	Sample size	Felipe González (PSOE)			
Polling firm/Commissioner	Fieldwork date	Sample size	check	X mark	Question	Net
CIS	13 Jun 1986	5,601	55.0	32.0	13.0	+23.0
CIS	9 Jun 1986	1,193	50.0	31.0	19.0	+19.0
CIS	5 Jun 1986	3,932	52.0	30.0	18.0	+22.0
CIS	29 May 1986	5,340	54.0	33.0	13.0	+21.0
CIS	21–25 May 1986	5,615	56.0	30.0	13.0	+26.0
CIS	15 May 1986	4,429	55.0	31.0	14.0	+24.0
CIS	8 May 1986	4,958	49.0	29.0	22.0	+20.0
CIS	2 May 1986	25,667	56.0	26.0	18.0	+30.0
CIS	1 Feb–1 Mar 1986	2,454	54.0	29.0	17.0	+25.0
CIS	1 Feb 1986	2,493	57.0	30.0	13.0	+27.0
CIS	1 Nov 1985	12,319	57.0	27.0	16.0	+30.0
CIS	1 Oct 1985	1,232	54.0	30.0	16.0	+24.0
CIS	1 May 1985	2,484	54.2	29.9	16.0	+24.3
Gallup	19–28 Jan 1985	1,033	54.0	28.0	18.0	+26.0
CIS	1 Nov–1 Dec 1984	12,389	54.0	30.0	16.0	+24.0
Gallup	11–30 Nov 1984	1,035	56.0	29.0	15.0	+27.0
Servicio de Estudios/El País	22–24 Oct 1984	2,000	60.0	26.6	13.4	+33.4
Gallup	22 Sep–9 Oct 1984	1,024	58.0	28.0	14.0	+30.0
Iope–Etmar/Mediterráneo	14 Sep–8 Oct 1984	1,852	57.0	32.0	11.0	+25.0
Gallup	24 Aug–4 Sep 1984	?	59.0	25.0	16.0	+34.0
Gallup	10–21 Jul 1984	1,029	54.0	31.0	15.0	+23.0
Gallup	15–26 May 1984	989	45.0	26.0	29.0	+19.0
Gallup	9–19 Apr 1984	1,024	56.0	27.0	17.0	+29.0
Gallup	12–24 Mar 1984	1,031	49.0	31.0	20.0	+18.0
Gallup	23 Jan–8 Feb 1984	954	58.0	17.0	25.0	+41.0
Iope–Etmar/Mediterráneo	2–27 Nov 1983	2,200	68.0	14.0	18.0	+54.0
Gallup	5–18 Oct 1983	959	58.0	22.0	20.0	+36.0
Gallup	6–19 Jul 1983	1,027	58.0	15.0	26.0	+43.0
Gallup	2–15 Feb 1983	1,024	62.0	13.0	25.0	+49.0
