= 1986 Spanish general election =

- 22 June 1986

All 350 seats in the Congress of Deputies and 208 (of 254) seats in the Senate 176 (Note: Given that HB deputies did not usually take their seats, the number of deputies needed for a majority was in practice slightly lower. HB won 5 seats, meaning a practical majority required at least 173 seats.) seats needed for a majority in the Congress of Deputies
- Opinion polls
- Registered: 29,117,613 ▲8.5%
- Turnout: 20,524,858 (70.5%) ▼9.5 pp
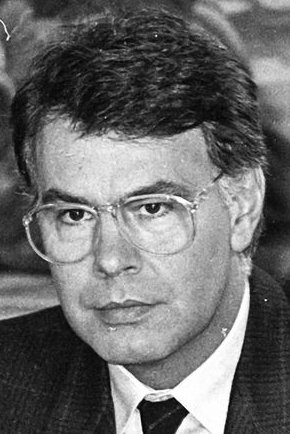

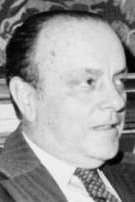

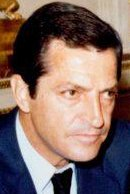

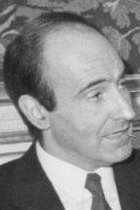

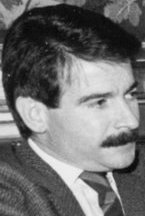

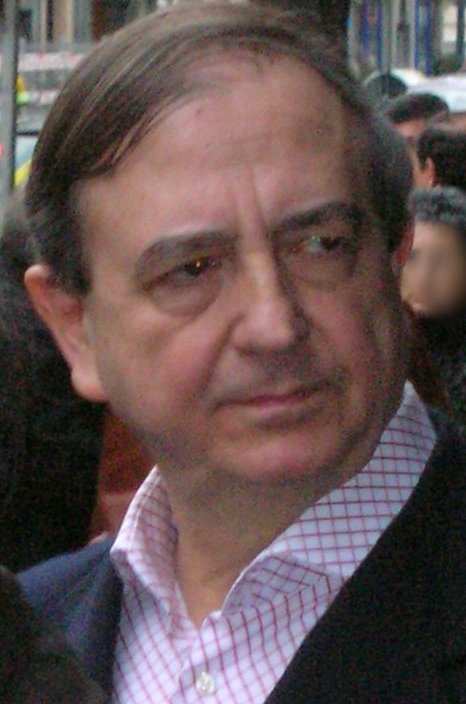
	First party	Second party	Third party
Leader	Felipe González	Manuel Fraga	Adolfo Suárez
Party	PSOE	AP–PDP–PL	CDS
Leader since	28 September 1979	9 October 1976	29 July 1982
Leader's seat	Madrid	Madrid	Madrid
Last election	202 seats, 48.1%	107 seats, 26.4% (Note: Results for AP–PDP in the 1982 election.)	2 seats, 2.9%
Seats won	184	105	19
Seat change	▼18	▼2	▲17
Popular vote	8,901,718	5,247,677	1,861,912
Percentage	44.1%	26.0%	9.2%
Swing	▼4.0 pp	▼0.4 pp	▲6.3 pp
	Fourth party	Fifth party	Sixth party
Leader	Miquel Roca	Gerardo Iglesias	Iñaki Anasagasti
Party	PRD–CiU–CG (Note: The PRD, CiU and CG contested the election separately and under their own brands, but agreed to field Miguel Roca as their joint prime ministerial candidate and did not compete against each other in the same geographical regions.)	IU	EAJ/PNV
Leader since	4 July 1982	10 December 1982	1986
Leader's seat	Barcelona	Madrid	Biscay
Last election	12 seats, 3.7% (Note: Results for CiU in the 1982 election.)	4 seats, 4.2% (Note: Results for PCE (4.0%, 4 deputies and 0 senators) and NE (0.1%, 0 seats) in the 1982 election.)	8 seats, 1.9%
Seats won	19	7	6
Seat change	▲7	▲3	▼2
Popular vote	1,288,768	935,504	309,610
Percentage	6.4%	4.6%	1.5%
Swing	▲2.7 pp	▲0.4 pp	▼0.4 pp
Prime Minister before election
Felipe González
PSOE
Prime Minister after election
Felipe González
PSOE

A general election was held in Spain on 22 June 1986 to elect the members of the 3rd Cortes Generales under the Spanish Constitution of 1978. All 350 seats in the Congress of Deputies were up for election, as well as 208 of 254 seats in the Senate. It was held concurrently with a regional election in Andalusia.

The election was held after the March 1986 Spanish NATO membership referendum had resulted in a surprising win for the 'In' camp headed by Prime Minister Felipe González. Reinforced from the referendum result, the Spanish Socialist Workers' Party (PSOE) sought to take advantage of the favorable political situation. The election resulted in the PSOE winning a second consecutive—albeit diminished—majority with 184 out of 350 seats. Its immediate competitor, Manuel Fraga's People's Coalition, an electoral alliance formed by People's Alliance (AP), the People's Democratic Party (PDP) and the Liberal Party (PL), remained stagnant with a similar result to the one obtained in 1982 by the AP–PDP alliance. The disappointing election result caused the Coalition to break apart shortly afterwards.

Former PM Adolfo Suárez's Democratic and Social Centre (CDS) came out in third place with nearly 1.9 million votes, 9.2% of the share and 19 seats. The Communist Party of Spain (PCE) contested the election within the newborn left-wing United Left (IU) alliance, slightly improving on the PCE's result in 1982 with 4.6% and 7 seats and holding its own against the Communists' Unity Board (MUC), Santiago Carrillo's split party founded after him being expelled from the PCE, which won no seats.

Two future prime ministers (José Luis Rodríguez Zapatero and Mariano Rajoy) were first elected as deputies at this election.

== Background ==
Shortly after assuming office on 2 December 1982, Prime Minister Felipe González had to face a worsening economic situation, with high inflation, soaring unemployment and a public deficit at 6%. Among the new PSOE government's first economic measures were the nationalization of the Rumasa holding due to its financial situation, alleged fraudulent practices and continuous evasion from the inspection activity conducted by the Bank of Spain, the reduction of working time to 40-hour week, the establishment of a minimum legal annual leave of 30 days and a lunch break of 15 minutes.

This period saw major reforms being implemented in order to achieve economic recovery as well as equalization of Spain with the remainder of Europe, including an unpopular economic stabilization plan involving a process of industrial restructuring (which led to the closure of many obsolete industries) and a reform of the pension system which lengthened the period used to calculate full pension benefits from 10 to 15 years and adopted a new system for pension revaluation. This economic policy received widespread criticism from trade unions—including the historically PSOE-aligned UGT—leading to strikes and demonstrations opposing the government's economic policy. A new labor reform was approved, which included fiscal incentives to investment, added protection for unemployed and the easing of temporality through the implementation of fixed-term contracts. González's first term also saw the establishment of the Spanish National Health System and universal health care in Spain, and decriminalization of abortion in three cases: therapeutic in cases of serious risk to the physical or mental health of the pregnant woman, during the first 12 weeks; criminological in cases of woman rape, during the first 22 weeks; and eugenic in cases of fetus malformations, at any time during pregnancy. Free and compulsory education was established until the age of 16.

Internally, these years were marked by a harsh hostile campaign from terrorist group ETA, with around one hundred dead throughout the 1982–1986 period as a result of its activity, which was countered with a similarly harsh government response. The PSOE government also had to deal with the issue of military insurrectionism, with a profound reorganization of the Spanish Armed Forces by promoting an increase of civil authority over the military, with the final aim of professionalizing the Armed Forces and end the threat of military coup attempts. Felipe González also came briefly involved in the 1984 German Flick affair, when SPD MP Peter Struck said in the German press that another MP from his party, Hans-Jürgen Wischnewski, had given one million marks from the corruption plot to González himself. The Spanish prime minister countered this with a remarkable statement at the time: "I have not received a single mark, a single penny, a single peseta, neither from Flick nor from Flock", and was later acquitted from the scandal by the inquiry commission in Congress.

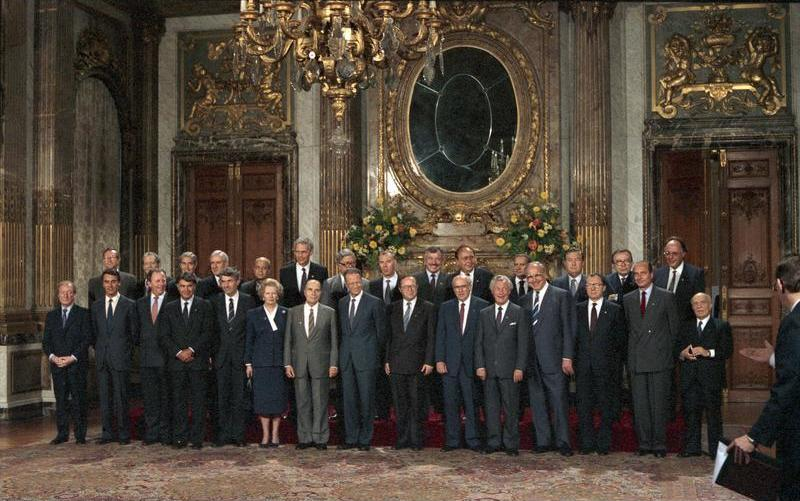
The Spanish entry into the EEC was regarded as one of the major political successes of Felipe González's first government.

Internationally, the PSOE government was successful in culminating negotiations for the Spanish entry into the European Economic Community (EEC), effective from 1 January 1986. The issue of NATO membership was more controversial, as the PSOE had campaigned for the holding of a referendum on the issue after Leopoldo Calvo-Sotelo's move to enter the alliance in May 1982. However, once in power Felipe González evolved to support NATO. According to Santos Juliá, the main factors that influenced the PSOE government's change of attitude were "pressure from the United States and several European countries; the connection between staying in NATO and Spain–EEC negotiations and the growing favorable stance of the Spanish Defence Ministry to attain closer ties with the Alliance". By 1985, as Spain had signed the Act of Accession to the EEC, preparations for the referendum on NATO membership started, being eventually held on 12 March 1986. NATO permanence option won the vote by a surprising 53.1% to 40.3%, and the PSOE came out reinforced.

Within the opposition, the Union of the Democratic Centre (UCD) was dissolved in February 1983. Under Manuel Fraga's leadership, the People's Alliance (AP) and the People's Democratic Party (PDP) joined with other parties to form the People's Coalition, seeking to build on his idea of the "natural majority" of the centre-right in order to win the next general election. At the same time, Catalan politician Miquel Roca tried to enter national politics by founding the Democratic Reformist Party (PRD), supported by the Catalan-based Convergence and Union (CiU), the Liberal Democratic Party (PDL) of Antonio Garrigues Walker and a number of regional parties, in what came to be known as "Operation Roca". All attempts at forming a common alliance between the three main centre to centre-right political forces—including the growing Democratic and Social Centre (CDS) of former prime minister Adolfo Suárez—failed throughout 1985. In the left, the Communist Party of Spain (PCE) experienced an internal crisis which saw the resignation of its leader Santiago Carrillo and his succession by Gerardo Iglesias. Internal disagreements resulted in splits that saw the birth of the Communist Party of the Peoples of Spain (PCPE) and the Workers' Party of Spain–Communist Unity (PTE-UC).

== Overview ==
Under the 1978 Constitution, the Spanish Cortes Generales were conceived as an imperfect bicameral system. The Congress of Deputies held greater legislative power than the Senate, having the ability to grant or withdraw confidence from a prime minister and to override Senate vetoes by an absolute majority. Nonetheless, the Senate retained a limited number of specific functions—such as ratifying international treaties, authorizing cooperation agreements between autonomous communities, enforcing direct rule, regulating interterritorial compensation funds, and taking part in constitutional amendments and in the appointment of members to the Constitutional Court and the General Council of the Judiciary—which were not subject to override by Congress.

=== Date ===
The term of each chamber of the Cortes Generales—the Congress and the Senate—expired four years from the date of their previous election, unless they were dissolved earlier. The election decree was required to be issued no later than 25 days before the scheduled expiration date of parliament and published on the following day in the Official State Gazette (BOE), with election day taking place between 54 and 60 days after the decree's publication. The previous election was held on 28 October 1982, which meant that the chambers' terms would have expired on 28 October 1986. The election decree was required to be published in the BOE no later than 4 October 1986, setting the latest possible date for election day on 3 December 1986.

The prime minister had the prerogative to propose the monarch to dissolve both chambers at any given time—either jointly or separately—and call a snap election, provided that no motion of no confidence was in process, no state of emergency was in force and that dissolution did not occur before one year after a previous one. Additionally, both chambers were to be dissolved and a new election called if an investiture process failed to elect a prime minister within a two-month period from the first ballot. Barring this exception, there was no constitutional requirement for simultaneous elections to the Congress and the Senate. Still, as of 2026, there has been no precedent of separate elections taking place under the 1978 Constitution.

While the 1986 general election was initially expected for October, there was widespread opinion that a snap election would be held in June alongside the scheduled 1986 Andalusian regional election, with part of the government remaining ambiguous on the issue. On 21 April, Felipe González announced his intention to trigger an early dissolution of the Cortes Generales, explaining that it was his wish to prevent "political uncertainties" resulting from an autumn election that could affect the country's economic prospects during the making of the 1987 General State Budget.

The Cortes Generales were officially dissolved on 23 April 1986 with the publication of the corresponding decree in the BOE, setting election day for 22 June and scheduling for both chambers to reconvene on 15 July.

=== Electoral system ===
Voting for each chamber of the Cortes Generales was based on universal suffrage, comprising all Spanish nationals over 18 years of age with full political rights, provided that they had not been deprived of the right to vote by a final sentence, nor were legally incapacitated.

The Congress of Deputies had a minimum of 300 and a maximum of 400 seats, with electoral provisions fixing its size at 350. Of these, 348 were elected in 50 multi-member constituencies corresponding to the provinces of Spain—each of which was assigned an initial minimum of two seats and the remaining 248 distributed in proportion to population—using the D'Hondt method and closed-list proportional voting, with a three percent-threshold of valid votes (including blank ballots) in each constituency. The remaining two seats were allocated to Ceuta and Melilla as single-member districts elected by plurality voting. The use of this electoral method resulted in a higher effective threshold depending on district magnitude and vote distribution.

As a result of the aforementioned allocation, each Congress multi-member constituency was entitled the following seats:

Seats	Constituencies (Note: The province of Oviedo was officially renamed as "Asturias" on 8 April 1983.)
33	Barcelona, Madrid^{(+1)}
16	Valencia^{(+1)}
12	Seville
10	Alicante^{(+1)}, Biscay
9	Asturias^{(−1)}, Cádiz^{(+1)}, La Coruña, Málaga^{(+1)}
8	Murcia, Pontevedra, Zaragoza
7	Córdoba, Granada, Guipúzcoa, Las Palmas^{(+1)}
6	Badajoz^{(−1)}, Balearics, Jaén^{(−1)}, Santa Cruz de Tenerife^{(−1)}
5	Almería, Cáceres, Cantabria, Castellón, Ciudad Real, Gerona, Huelva, León^{(−1)}, Lugo, Navarre, Orense, Tarragona, Toledo, Valladolid
4	Álava, Albacete, Burgos, La Rioja, Lérida, Salamanca, Zamora
3	Ávila, Cuenca^{(−1)}, Guadalajara, Huesca, Palencia, Segovia, Soria, Teruel

208 Senate seats were elected using open-list (Note: Parties could group candidates into lists, although each candidate was treated separately for the purpose of the voting procedure.) partial block voting: voters in constituencies electing four seats could choose up to three candidates; in those with two or three seats, up to two; and in single-member districts, one. Each of the 47 peninsular provinces was allocated four seats, while in insular provinces—such as the Balearic and Canary Islands—the districts were the islands themselves, with the larger ones (Mallorca, Gran Canaria and Tenerife) being allocated three seats each, and the smaller ones (Menorca, Ibiza–Formentera, Fuerteventura, La Gomera, El Hierro, Lanzarote and La Palma) one each. Ceuta and Melilla elected two seats each. Additionally, autonomous communities could appoint at least one senator each and were entitled to one additional seat per million inhabitants.

The law did not provide for by-elections to fill vacant seats; instead, any vacancies arising after the proclamation of candidates and during the legislative term were filled by the next candidates on the party lists or, when required, by designated substitutes.

=== Outgoing parliament ===
The tables below show the composition of the parliamentary groups in both chambers at the time of dissolution.

Parliamentary composition in April 1986
Congress of Deputies
Groups	Parties	Deputies	
Groups	Parties	Seats	Total
Congress Socialist Parliamentary Group	PSOE	177	202
Congress Socialist Parliamentary Group	PSC	25	202
Congress People's Parliamentary Group	AP	83	103
Congress People's Parliamentary Group	PDP	14	103
Congress People's Parliamentary Group	UPN	2	103
Congress People's Parliamentary Group	PAR	2	103
Congress People's Parliamentary Group	PL	1	103
Congress People's Parliamentary Group	UV	1	103
Catalan Minority Parliamentary Group	CDC	9	12
Catalan Minority Parliamentary Group	UDC	3	12
Centrist Parliamentary Group	PDP	2	11
Centrist Parliamentary Group	CG	2	11
Centrist Parliamentary Group	AP	2	11
Centrist Parliamentary Group	PL	1	11
Centrist Parliamentary Group	AIC	1	11
Centrist Parliamentary Group	INDEP	3	11
Basque Parliamentary Group (PNV)	EAJ/PNV	8	8
Mixed Parliamentary Group	PCE	3	14
Mixed Parliamentary Group	CDS	2	14
Mixed Parliamentary Group	HB	2	14
Mixed Parliamentary Group	PCEmr	1	14
Mixed Parliamentary Group	ERC	1	14
Mixed Parliamentary Group	EE	1	14
Mixed Parliamentary Group	INDEP	4 (Note: María Victoria Fernández-España, former AP legislator; Manuel Gallent, former PDP legislator; Anastasio Modrego, former PL legislator; Vicente Ramos, former UV legislator.)	14

Parliamentary composition in April 1986
Senate
Groups	Parties	Senators	
Groups	Parties	Seats	Total
Socialist Parliamentary Group	PSOE	143	154
Socialist Parliamentary Group	PSC	11	154
People's Parliamentary Group	AP	51	66
People's Parliamentary Group	PDP	12	66
People's Parliamentary Group	PAR	2	66
People's Parliamentary Group	UM	1	66
Basque Nationalist Senators' Parliamentary Group	EAJ/PNV	9	9
Catalonia in the Senate Parliamentary Group	CDC	6	7
Catalonia in the Senate Parliamentary Group	UDC	1	7
Mixed Parliamentary Group	ERC	2	15
Mixed Parliamentary Group	CG	2	15
Mixed Parliamentary Group	AIC	2	15
Mixed Parliamentary Group	PCE	1	15
Mixed Parliamentary Group	ADEI	1	15
Mixed Parliamentary Group	AM	1	15
Mixed Parliamentary Group	AHI	1	15
Mixed Parliamentary Group	INDEP	5 (Note: Fernando Gil and José Rodríguez, former AP legislators; Guillermo Fernández, former PSOE legislator; Luis Merino, former UCD legislator; Narcís Oliveras, former UDC legislator.)	15

== Candidates ==
=== Nomination rules ===
Spanish citizens with the right to vote could run for election, provided that they had not been criminally imprisoned by a final sentence or convicted—whether final or not—of offences that involved loss of eligibility or disqualification from public office (such as rebellion or terrorism, when involving crimes against life, physical integrity or personal freedom). Additional causes of ineligibility applied to the following officials:

- Members of the Spanish royal family and their spouses;
- Holders of a number of senior public or institutional posts, including the heads and members of higher courts and state institutions; (Note: These comprised the Constitutional Court, the General Council of the Judiciary, the Supreme Court, the Council of State and the Court of Auditors.) the Ombudsman; the State's Attorney General; high-ranking officials of government departments, the Office of the Prime Minister and other state agencies; government delegates in the autonomous communities and civil governors; the director-general of RTVE; the director of the Electoral Register Office; the governor and deputy governor of the Bank of Spain; the heads of official credit institutions; and members of electoral commissions and of the Nuclear Safety Council;
- Heads of diplomatic missions abroad;
- Judges and public prosecutors in active service;
- Members of the Armed Forces and law enforcement bodies in active service.

Other ineligibility provisions also applied to a number of territorial officials in these categories within their areas of jurisdiction, as well as to employees of foreign states and members of regional governments.

Incompatibility rules included those of ineligibility, and also barred running in multiple constituencies, and combining legislative roles (deputy, senator, and regional lawmaker) with each other or with:

- A number of senior public or institutional posts, including the presidency of the Competition Defence Court; and leadership positions in RTVE, government offices, public authorities (such as port authorities, hydrographic confederations, or highway concessionary companies), public entities and state-owned or publicly funded companies;
- Any other paid public position, except university teaching.

=== Parties and lists ===
The electoral law allowed for parties and federations registered in the interior ministry, alliances and groupings of electors to present lists of candidates. Parties and federations intending to form an alliance were required to inform the relevant electoral commission within 10 days of the election call, whereas groupings of electors needed to secure the signature of at least one percent of the electorate in the constituencies for which they sought election, disallowing electors from signing for more than one list.

Below is a list of the main parties and alliances which contested the election:

Candidacy	Parties and alliances	Leading candidate	Ideology	Previous result				Gov.	Ref.
Candidacy	Parties and alliances	Leading candidate	Ideology	Congress		Senate		Gov.	Ref.
Candidacy	Parties and alliances	Leading candidate	Ideology	Vote %	Seats	Vote %	Seats	Gov.	Ref.
PSOE	List: Spanish Socialist Workers' Party (PSOE); Socialists' Party of Catalonia (PSC)	Felipe González	Social democracy	48.1%	202	47.6%	134	Yes	
AP–PDP–PL	List: People's Alliance (AP); People's Democratic Party (PDP); Liberal Party (PL); Navarrese People's Union (UPN); Centrists of Galicia (CdG)	Manuel Fraga	Conservatism; Christian democracy	26.4%	107	25.6%	54	No	
PRD– CiU–CG	List: Convergence and Union (CiU) – Democratic Convergence of Catalonia (CDC) – Democratic Union of Catalonia (UDC); Democratic Reformist Party (PRD); Galician Coalition (CG)	Miquel Roca	Centrism; Reformism	3.7%	12	(Note: CiU (5 senators) and ERC (2 senators) contested the 1982 Senate election within the CatSen alliance.)	5	No	
EAJ/PNV	List: Basque Nationalist Party (EAJ/PNV)	Iñaki Anasagasti	Basque nationalism Christian democracy	1.9%	8	2.0%	7	No	
IU	List: Communist Party of Spain (PCE); Socialist Action Party (PASOC); Communist Party of the Peoples of Spain (PCPE); Progressive Federation (FP); Carlist Party (PC); Humanist Party (PH); Republican Left (IR); Union of the Catalan Left (UEC) – Unified Socialist Party of Catalonia (PSUC) – Agreement of Left Nationalists (ENE)	Gerardo Iglesias	Socialism; Communism	4.2%	4	4.7%	0	No	
CDS	List: Democratic and Social Centre (CDS)	Adolfo Suárez	Centrism; Liberalism	2.9%	2	3.0%	0	No	
HB	List: Popular Unity (HB) – People's Socialist Revolutionary Party (HASI) – Basque Nationalist Action (EAE/ANV) – Patriotic Socialist Committees (ASK)	Jon Idigoras	Basque independence Abertzale left Revolutionary socialism	1.0%	2	1.1%	0	No	
ERC	List: Republican Left of Catalonia (ERC)	Francesc Vicens	Catalan nationalism Left-wing nationalism Social democracy	0.7%	1		2	No	
EE	List: Basque Country Left (EE)	Juan María Bandrés	Basque nationalism Socialism	0.5%	1	0.5%	0	No	
PAR	List: Regionalist Aragonese Party (PAR)	Hipólito Gómez de las Roces	Regionalism; Centrism	Contested in alliance (Note: The PAR (2 deputies and 2 senators) and UV (2 deputies and 0 senators) contested the 1982 election in alliance with AP–PDP.)				No	
UV	List: Valencian Union (UV)	Miguel Ramón	Blaverism; Conservatism	Contested in alliance				No	
AIC	List: Tenerife Group of Independents (ATI); La Palma Group of Independents (API); Independents of Fuerteventura (IF)	Manuel Hermoso	Regionalism; Canarian nationalism Conservatism	Did not contest				No	
MUC	List: Communist Party of Spain (Revolutionary Marxist) (PCEmr)	Santiago Carrillo	Eurocommunism; Revolutionary socialism	Did not contest				No	
Not contesting
UCD	List: Union of the Democratic Centre (UCD)	None (Party dissolved)	Centrism	6.8%	11	6.8%	4	No	

== Campaign ==
=== Party slogans ===
Party or alliance	Original slogan	English translation	Ref.
PSOE	« Por buen camino »	"On track"	
AP–PDP–PL	« Para salir adelante » « Con la verdad por delante »	"To get ahead" "With truth ahead"	
PRD–CiU–CG	« La otra forma de hacer España » « Un aire nou al Govern »	"The other way of building Spain" "A breath of fresh air in the Government"	
IU	« Hace falta » « Nos van a oír »	"It is needed" "They shall hear us"	
CDS	« El valor del centro » « El centro avanza »	"The value of the centre" "The centre goes forward"	
MUC	« Los comunistas, seguro »	"The communists, for sure"	

=== Debates ===
González rejected participating in any leaders' debate. Other debates were organised between various parties.

1986 Spanish general election debates
Date	Organizer(s)	Moderator(s)	P Present (Note: Denotes a main invitee attending the event.) S Surrogate (Note: Denotes a main invitee not attending the event, sending a surrogate in their place.) NI Not invited I Invited A Absent invitee							
Date	Organizer(s)	Moderator(s)	PSOE	CP	PRD–CiU	IU	CDS	MUC	Audience	Ref.
27 May	RTVE (Note: Social welfare debate.)	Paco Lobatón	P Maravall	P Verstrynge	NI	NI	NI	NI	—	
3 Jun	RTVE (Note: Civil liberties debate.)	Paco Lobatón	P Ledesma	P Alzaga	NI	NI	NI	NI	—	
10 Jun	RTVE (Note: Economy and labour debate.)	Paco Lobatón	P Solchaga	NI	NI	P Sartorius	NI	P Ariza	—	
17 Jun	RTVE (Note: Administration debate.)	Paco Lobatón	P Guerra	P R. de Miñón	S S. de Robles	NI	S Castedo	NI	—	

=== Spanish Socialist Workers' Party ===
The Spanish Socialist Workers' Party under Felipe González campaigned on a continuity platform, emphasizing on the idea of progress and trying to highlight that the party's management of government during the previous four years had been positive for the country. The democratization process after the turbulent years of the early 1980s was deemed as having been fully completed, the military insurrectionism threat had been vanquished, Spain had been integrated within Europe and the economic crisis was easening, with the brunt of the industrial conversion having been dealt with in the first years of Socialist government. It also tried to deliver on the idea that the party's programme was not yet fulfilled, with many proposals still left to be carried out. Another message of the Socialist electoral campaign revolved around the idea that a non-Socialist government would revert the political and social advances accomplished in the previous years, with PM González himself warning of a possible alternative coalition between the various centre and centre-right parties in case the PSOE lost its absolute majority.

There were notable divergences from the campaigning style of 1982: González himself, being now the Prime Minister, had a busy public agenda and was only able to participate in large campaign events during weekends, having little time to maintain direct contact with party militants. He also wanted to distance himself from direct confrontation to the other parties' candidates, usually leaving that task to Deputy Prime Minister Alfonso Guerra and other PSOE leaders, in order to emphasize his image as Chief of the Executive. The PSOE's electoral manifesto for the 1986 election also avoided making any concrete pledges such as those done in 1982.

Opposition parties had accused the PSOE government of a rudely style of ruling, of arrogance, of little austerity and of informational opacity, a result, according to them, of the large absolute majority of seats it had obtained in the 1982 election. Thus, one of the PSOE's self-imposed objectives during the election campaign was to maintain that absolute majority. In the end, the PSOE would win the election but with a significantly reduced majority of 184 seats, compared to the 202-strong majority achieved in 1982.

=== People's Coalition ===
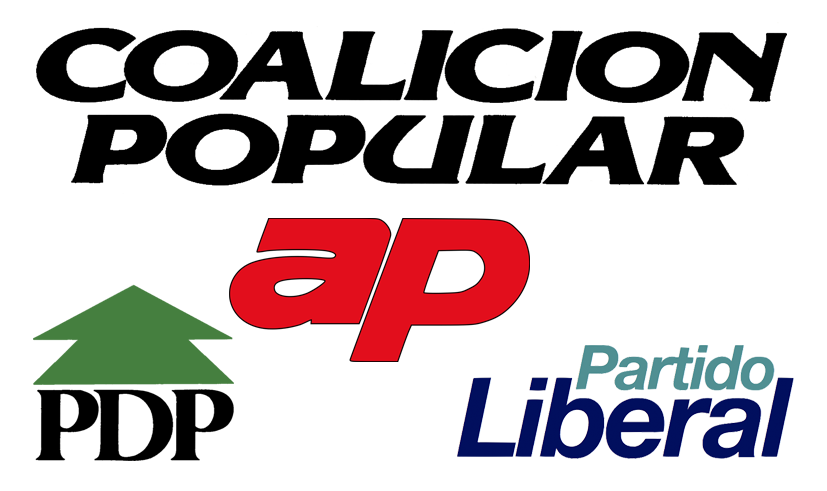
People's Coalition logo (1986).

The People's Alliance, the People's Democratic Party and the Liberal Party contested the election in a common ticket under the People's Coalition label. Some regionalist parties in different autonomous communities, such as the Navarrese People's Union in Navarre, also joined the coalition, who was to be led into the election by AP leader Manuel Fraga.

Its campaign centered into criticising the González' government record in office, accusing the PSOE of breaking many of its 1982 election pledges and asking voters to support an alternative to the Socialists, with Fraga opening the possibility to invite other parties, specially the CDS and the PRD, into a coalition government aimed at ousting the PSOE from power. The Coalition released an election programme which was described as a mixture of economic neoliberalism and social conservatism. Among the Coalition's election pledges were the privatization of public companies (the most notable example being TVE 2) and of the healthcare assistance system in order to reduce tax burden and public spending; the implementation of a national plan against drugs; the illegalization of HB and tougher penalties for terrorists (going as far as to promise an end to ETA terrorism within 6 months); a repeal of the newly approved abortion law and a revision of the divorce law.

The Coalition was criticised for its perceived right-wing stance, with serious difficulties to define an alternative policy to the PSOE, a weak opposition stance to González' government (virtually trailing the Socialists on every issue) and a lack of initiative. The Coalition's call for abstention in the March referendum (despite the party's official stance favouring Spain permanence within NATO) had been a fatal blow to its expectations in the upcoming general election, being seen, on the one hand, as a gesture of political opportunism in an attempt to weaken Felipe González' position and, on the other hand, as showing a lack of political guidance. Instead, the 'Yes' landslide victory had reinforced the PSOE in the eyes of public opinion, but the Coalition's position on the referendum was met with skepticism and disapproval from other centre-right parties, both nationally and internationally.

=== United Left ===
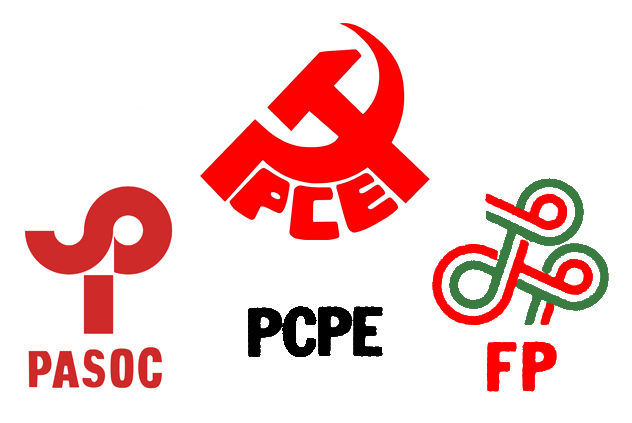
United Left logo (1986). It would not be until 1988 that a specific logo for IU would be designed.

The roots for the United Left (IU) coalition originated during the protests to demand the exit of Spain from NATO in 1986, with the "Platform of the United Left". While the 1986 referendum had resulted in the country's permanence within NATO, sectors to the left of the PSOE sought to form a unitary candidacy for the 1986 general election aimed at representing the nearly 7 million voters that had shown their position against such a permanence. Aside from the PCE, which was to become IU's main member party, also joining the coalition were the Unified Socialist Party of Catalonia (PSUC), the Socialist Action Party (PASOC), the Republican Left (IR), the Communist Party of the Peoples of Spain or the Collective for the Unity of Workers-Andalusian Left Bloc (CUT-BAI), among others.

Aside from its anti-NATO stance, the IU coalition also opposed the Socialist government's recent industrial conversion, which had been carried out almost unilaterally and with little to no talks with trade unions, thanks to the PSOE absolute majority in Congress. IU campaigned on a left-wing platform, accusing the PSOE of abandoning its socialist roots and of applying liberal policies. On the international stage, IU promised to bring Spain out of NATO, the dismantling of US bases and the withdrawal of US troops from Spanish soil, as well as to counter "the harmful consequences of integration within the EEC, a conception of Europe against the interests of multinationals and imperialism and to support initiatives for the elimination of nuclear weapons and against the militarization of space." On the domestic stage, IU's pledges included nationalizations in the banking and energy sectors. It also provided for large investments in the public sector, an agrarian reform and a federal model of state which provided for "the full development of the rights of nationalities and regions".

== Voter turnout ==
The table below shows registered voter turnout during the election. Figures for election day do not include non-resident citizens, while final figures do.

Region	Time (Election day)									Final		
Region	14:00			18:00			20:00			Final		
Region	1982	1986	+/–	1982	1986	+/–	1982	1986	+/–	1982	1986	+/–
Andalusia	38.71%	39.24%	+0.53	60.11%	56.57%	−3.54	78.75%	71.11%	−7.64	78.75%	70.77%	−7.98
Aragon	40.97%	42.54%	+1.57	67.98%	56.78%	−11.20	82.42%	70.86%	−11.56	82.42%	70.59%	−11.83
Asturias	45.00%	40.16%	−4.84	65.00%	57.05%	−7.95	77.60%	68.79%	−8.81	77.60%	67.82%	−9.78
Balearics	38.00%	38.36%	+0.36	61.00%	50.73%	−10.27	79.74%	66.16%	−13.58	79.74%	66.02%	−13.72
Basque Country	43.03%	41.42%	−1.61	62.57%	54.67%	−7.90	79.34%	67.84%	−11.50	79.34%	67.58%	−11.76
Canary Islands	34.11%	39.12%	+5.01	56.15%	56.25%	+0.10	76.00%	68.72%	−7.28	76.00%	68.28%	−7.72
Cantabria	46.00%	43.32%	−2.68	68.00%	61.35%	−6.65	82.67%	73.97%	−8.70	82.67%	73.43%	−9.24
Castile and León	48.65%	41.88%	−6.77	67.40%	60.70%	−6.70	80.66%	73.40%	−7.26	80.66%	72.81%	−7.85
Castilla–La Mancha	44.34%	43.40%	−0.94	69.10%	60.15%	−8.95	84.11%	75.29%	−8.82	84.11%	75.09%	−9.02
Catalonia	40.36%	41.27%	+0.91	65.62%	53.51%	−12.11	80.83%	69.19%	−11.64	80.83%	68.95%	−11.88
Extremadura	43.72%	45.50%	+1.78	58.41%	60.52%	+2.11	79.98%	73.91%	−6.07	79.98%	73.58%	−6.40
Galicia	30.40%	28.22%	−2.18	46.17%	45.77%	−0.40	63.70%	59.18%	−4.52	63.70%	57.89%	−5.81
La Rioja	47.50%	47.80%	+0.30	66.80%	61.64%	−5.16	84.10%	74.74%	−9.36	84.10%	74.31%	−9.79
Madrid	36.20%	40.88%	+4.68	65.74%	59.72%	−6.02	85.96%	74.31%	−11.65	85.96%	73.90%	−12.06
Murcia	41.57%	45.38%	+3.81	64.66%	59.20%	−5.46	82.49%	74.92%	−7.57	82.49%	74.66%	−7.83
Navarre	45.50%	43.24%	−2.26	65.40%	56.32%	−9.08	81.33%	70.26%	−11.07	81.33%	69.80%	−11.53
Valencian Community	37.78%	48.05%	+10.27	65.65%	62.53%	−3.12	84.03%	76.62%	−7.41	84.03%	76.40%	−7.63
Ceuta	41.93%	n/a	n/a	62.44%	46.93%	−15.51	72.29%	57.22%	−15.07	72.29%	56.70%	−15.59
Melilla	41.57%	37.32%	−4.25	60.46%	50.98%	−9.48	70.50%	60.68%	−9.82	70.50%	59.98%	−10.52
Total	39.75%	40.90%	+1.15	62.81%	56.73%	−6.08	79.97%	70.93%	−9.04	79.97%	70.49%	−9.48

== Results ==
=== Congress of Deputies ===
← Summary of the 22 June 1986 Congress of Deputies election results →
Parties and alliances	Popular vote			Seats	
Parties and alliances	Votes	%	±pp	Total	+/−
Spanish Socialist Workers' Party (PSOE)	8,901,718	44.06	−4.05	184	−18
People's Coalition (AP–PDP–PL)^{1}	5,247,677	25.97	−0.39	105	−2
Democratic and Social Centre (CDS)	1,861,912	9.22	+6.35	19	+17
Reformists (PRD–CiU–CG)	1,288,768	6.38	+2.71	19	+7
Convergence and Union (CiU)	1,014,258	5.02	+1.35	18	+6
Democratic Reformist Party (PRD)	194,538	0.96	New	0	±0
Galician Coalition (CG)	79,972	0.40	New	1	+1
United Left (IU)^{2}	935,504	4.63	+0.46	7	+3
Basque Nationalist Party (EAJ/PNV)	309,610	1.53	−0.35	6	−2
Popular Unity (HB)	231,722	1.15	+0.15	5	+3
Communists' Unity Board (MUC)	229,695	1.14	New	0	±0
Basque Country Left (EE)	107,053	0.53	+0.05	2	+1
Andalusian Party (PA)	94,008	0.47	+0.07	0	±0
Republican Left of Catalonia (ERC)	84,628	0.42	−0.24	0	−1
Workers' Socialist Party (PST)	77,914	0.39	−0.10	0	±0
Regionalist Aragonese Party (PAR)	73,004	0.36	New	1	+1
Canarian Independent Groups (AIC)	65,664	0.33	New	1	+1
Valencian Union (UV)	64,403	0.32	New	1	+1
Party of the Communists of Catalonia (PCC)	57,107	0.28	+0.06	0	±0
Galician Socialist Party–Galician Left (PSG–EG)^{3}	45,574	0.23	+0.12	0	±0
Spanish Phalanx of the CNSO (FE–JONS)	43,449	0.22	+0.21	0	±0
Communist Unification of Spain (UCE)	42,451	0.21	+0.10	0	±0
Valencian People's Union (UPV)	40,264	0.20	+0.11	0	±0
Canarian Assembly–Canarian Nationalist Left (AC–INC)	36,892	0.18	+0.09	0	±0
The Greens (LV)	31,909	0.16	New	0	±0
Green Alternative List (LAV)	29,567	0.15	New	0	±0
Spanish Vertex Ecological Development Revindication (VERDE)	28,318	0.14	New	0	±0
Republican Popular Unity (UPR)^{4}	27,473	0.14	+0.03	0	±0
Galician Nationalist Bloc (BNG)	27,049	0.13	−0.05	0	±0
Internationalist Socialist Workers' Party (POSI)	21,853	0.11	New	0	±0
United Extremadura (EU)	16,091	0.08	−0.04	0	±0
Socialist Party of the Andalusian People (PSPA)	14,999	0.07	New	0	±0
Socialist Party of Mallorca–Nationalist Left (PSM–EN)	7,539	0.04	±0.00	0	±0
National Unity Coalition (CUN)	5,209	0.03	New	0	±0
Revolutionary Workers' Party of Spain (PORE)	5,126	0.03	New	0	±0
Social Democratic Party of Catalonia (PSDC)	4,885	0.02	New	0	±0
Group of Independent Electors (ADEI)	3,857	0.02	New	0	±0
Leonese Convergence (CL)	2,520	0.01	New	0	±0
Regionalist Party of the Leonese Country (PREPAL)	2,449	0.01	−0.01	0	±0
Valencian Nationalist Left (ENV–URV)	2,116	0.01	−0.02	0	±0
Communist Workers' League (LOC)	1,952	0.01	−0.02	0	±0
Moderate Party–Centrists of Navarre (PMCN)	1,932	0.01	New	0	±0
Natural Culture (CN)	1,886	0.01	New	0	±0
Murcian Regionalist Party (PRM)	1,401	0.01	New	0	±0
Democratic Spanish Party (PED)	1,169	0.01	New	0	±0
Nationalist Party of Castile and León (PANCAL)	1,047	0.01	New	0	±0
Candidacy for Autonomy (CA)	758	0.00	New	0	±0
Proverist Party (PPr)	756	0.00	±0.00	0	±0
Electoral Group–Independent Group of Ceuta (AE–AIC)	601	0.00	New	0	±0
Christian Spanish Party (PAEC)	254	0.00	New	0	±0
Communist Movement of the Basque Country (EMK)	0	0.00	New	0	±0
Revolutionary Communist League (LKI)	0	0.00	−0.01	0	±0
Union of the Democratic Centre (UCD)	n/a	n/a	−6.77	0	−11
Blank ballots	121,186	0.60	+0.13		
Total	20,202,919			350	±0
Valid votes	20,202,919	98.43	+0.38		
Invalid votes	321,939	1.57	−0.38		
Votes cast / turnout	20,524,858	70.49	−9.48		
Abstentions	8,592,755	29.51	+9.48		
Registered voters	29,117,613				
Sources
Footnotes: ^{1} People's Coalition results are compared to People's Alliance–People's Democratic Party totals in the 1982 election.; ^{2} United Left results are compared to the combined totals of the Communist Party of Spain and Left Nationalists in the 1982 election.; ^{3} Galician Socialist Party–Galician Left results are compared to Galician Left totals in the 1982 election.; ^{4} Republican Popular Unity results are compared to Communist Party of Spain (Marxist–Leninist) totals in the 1982 election.

Popular vote
PSOE	44.06%
AP–PDP–PL	25.97%
CDS	9.22%
PRD–CiU–CG	6.38%
IU	4.63%
EAJ/PNV	1.53%
HB	1.15%
MUC	1.14%
EE	0.53%
PAR	0.36%
AIC	0.33%
UV	0.32%
Others	4.40%
Blank ballots	0.60%

Seats
PSOE	52.57%
AP–PDP–PL	30.00%
CDS	5.43%
PRD–CiU–CG	5.43%
IU	2.00%
EAJ/PNV	1.71%
HB	1.43%
EE	0.57%
PAR	0.29%
AIC	0.29%
UV	0.29%

=== Senate ===
← Summary of the 22 June 1986 Senate of Spain election results →
Parties and alliances	Popular vote			Seats	
Parties and alliances	Votes	%	±pp	Total	+/−
Spanish Socialist Workers' Party (PSOE)	24,719,863	44.52	−3.08	124	−10
People's Coalition (AP–PDP–PL)^{1}	14,485,103	26.09	+0.41	63	+9
Democratic and Social Centre (CDS)	4,537,464	8.17	+5.19	3	+3
Reformists (PRD–CiU–CG)	3,687,520	6.64	n/a	8	+3
Convergence and Union (CiU)^{3}	2,934,479	5.28	n/a	8	+3
Democratic Reformist Party (PRD)	514,504	0.93	New	0	±0
Galician Coalition (CG)	238,537	0.43	New	0	±0
United Left (IU)	2,583,230	4.65	−0.01	0	±0
Basque Nationalist Party (EAJ/PNV)	934,198	1.68	−0.32	7	±0
Popular Unity (HB)	677,204	1.22	+0.16	1	+1
Communists' Unity Board (MUC)	651,544	1.17	New	0	±0
Basque Country Left (EE)	311,471	0.56	+0.06	0	±0
Andalusian Party (PA)	297,220	0.54	+0.04	0	±0
Republican Left of Catalonia (ERC)^{3}	255,718	0.46	n/a	0	−2
Regionalist Aragonese Party (PAR)	254,729	0.46	New	0	±0
Valencian Union (UV)	226,909	0.41	New	0	±0
Spanish Phalanx of the CNSO (FE–JONS)	175,971	0.32	+0.30	0	±0
Party of the Communists of Catalonia (PCC)	148,090	0.27	−0.05	0	±0
Spanish Vertex Ecological Development Revindication (VERDE)	147,962	0.27	+0.11	0	±0
Valencian People's Union (UPV)	136,150	0.25	+0.24	0	±0
Galician Socialist Party–Galician Left (PSG–EG)^{4}	133,516	0.24	+0.12	0	±0
Canarian Independent Groups (AIC)	130,173	0.23	New	1	+1
The Greens (LV)	108,418	0.20	New	0	±0
Galician Nationalist Bloc (BNG)	84,113	0.15	−0.05	0	±0
Workers' Socialist Party (PST)	80,907	0.15	−0.32	0	±0
Green Alternative List (LAV)	71,481	0.13	New	0	±0
United Extremadura (EU)	58,349	0.11	−0.08	0	±0
Canarian Assembly–Canarian Nationalist Left (AC–INC)	49,129	0.09	+0.04	0	±0
Socialist Party of the Andalusian People (PSPA)	43,137	0.08	New	0	±0
Communist Unification of Spain (UCE)	31,916	0.06	+0.04	0	±0
Internationalist Socialist Workers' Party (POSI)	24,131	0.04	New	0	±0
Revolutionary Workers' Party of Spain (PORE)	20,890	0.04	New	0	±0
National Unity Coalition (CUN)	20,787	0.04	New	0	±0
Socialist Party of Mallorca–Nationalist Left (PSM–EN)	14,669	0.03	−0.01	0	±0
Regionalist Party of the Leonese Country (PREPAL)	13,452	0.02	−0.01	0	±0
Natural Culture (CN)	13,036	0.02	−0.13	0	±0
Leonese Convergence (CL)	10,475	0.02	New	0	±0
Lanzarote Electoral Group (AEL)	9,471	0.02	New	0	±0
Melillan People's Union (UPM)	9,097	0.02	New	0	±0
Republican Popular Unity (UPR)^{5}	6,247	0.01	−0.02	0	±0
Majorera Assembly (AM)	5,604	0.01	±0.00	1	±0
Group of Independent Electors (ADEI)	5,204	0.01	New	0	±0
Proverist Party (PPr)	5,073	0.01	+0.01	0	±0
Moderate Party–Centrists of Navarre (PMCN)	4,895	0.01	New	0	±0
Social Democratic Party of Catalonia (PSDC)	4,286	0.01	New	0	±0
Valencian Nationalist Left (ENV–URV)	3,951	0.01	−0.06	0	±0
Ecologist Movement of Spain (MEE)	3,824	0.01	New	0	±0
Agreement of the Left of Menorca (PSM–EU)	3,687	0.01	New	0	±0
Popular Castilian Action (ACP)	3,548	0.01	New	0	±0
Murcian Regionalist Party (PRM)	3,169	0.01	New	0	±0
Nationalist Party of Castile and León (PANCAL)	2,932	0.01	New	0	±0
Christian Spanish Party (PAEC)	2,072	0.00	New	0	±0
Pensionist Party (PENS)	1,615	0.00	New	0	±0
Candidacy for Autonomy (CA)	1,406	0.00	New	0	±0
Electoral Group–Independent Group of Ceuta (AE–AIC)	1,017	0.00	New	0	±0
Union of the Democratic Centre (UCD)	n/a	n/a	−6.84	0	−4
Group of Independent Electors (ADEI)	n/a	n/a	−0.03	0	−1
Blank ballots (Note: The percentage of blank ballots is calculated over the official number of valid votes cast, irrespective of the total number of votes shown as a result of adding up the individual results for each party.)	311,305	1.57	−0.21		
Total	55,527,328			208	±0
Valid votes	19,795,126	96.68			
Invalid votes	678,993	3.32			
Votes cast / turnout	20,474,119	70.32			
Abstentions	8,643,494	29.68			
Registered voters	29,117,613				
Sources
Footnotes: ^{1} People's Coalition results are compared to People's Alliance–People's Democratic Party totals in the 1982 election.; ^{2} United Left results are compared to the combined totals of the Communist Party of Spain and Left Nationalists in the 1982 election.; ^{3} Within the Catalonia in the Senate alliance in the 1982 election.; ^{4} Galician Socialist Party–Galician Left results are compared to Galician Left totals in the 1982 election.; ^{5} Republican Popular Unity results are compared to Communist Party of Spain (Marxist–Leninist) totals in the 1982 election.

Popular vote
PSOE	44.52%
AP–PDP–PL	26.09%
CDS	8.17%
PRD–CiU–CG	6.64%
IU	4.65%
EAJ/PNV	1.68%
HB	1.22%
MUC	1.17%
AIC	0.23%
AM	0.01%
Others	5.05%
Blank ballots	1.57%

Seats
PSOE	59.62%
AP–PDP–PL	30.29%
PRD–CiU–CG	3.85%
EAJ/PNV	3.37%
CDS	1.44%
HB	0.48%
AIC	0.48%
AM	0.48%

=== Maps ===
Election results by constituency (Congress).

Vote winner strength by constituency (Congress).

Vote winner strength by autonomous community (Congress).

== Aftermath ==
=== Outcome ===
The 1986 election results showed little changes to the balance of power with respect to 1982. Overall, the Spanish Socialist Workers' Party (PSOE) remained the dominant party in Spanish politics by securing a second consecutive overall majority in the Congress of Deputies. Prime Minister Felipe González was regarded to have come out reinforced from the election. With his popularity already soaring after winning the NATO referendum on March, politically turned into a plebiscite on his premiership, the election results further strengthened his political position by securing him a new mandate to continue the reforms already in place since in 1982. Nonetheless, the election unveiled the first signs of weariness of the PSOE government, as it suffered major losses in support in the major urban centers, the same that had set out the seed for González's landslide victory in 1982. In the Madrid Community the PSOE suffered the most, scoring a bare 40% from the 52% it had secured four years previously. Despite this, discontent towards the government did not translate into major inroads for other parties. Voters' apathy and the absence of strong alternatives to the Socialists translating into a substantial increase of the abstention rate, which rose to 29.5% from the 20.0% of 1982.

The centre-right People's Coalition (AP–PDP–PL) failed to secure substantial gains from the 1982 result of the People's Alliance–People's Democratic Party (AP–PDP) alliance, experiencing small gains in Castile and León, Extremadura and Melilla but falling elsewhere. Adolfo Suárez's Democratic and Social Centre (CDS) virtually took over the place of the defunct Union of the Democratic Centre (UCD) with nearly 2 million votes and 19 seats. On the other hand, results for the Democratic Reformist Party (PRD) of Miquel Roca were an unmitigated disaster and a blow to Roca's national aspirations, disbanding shortly thereafter. Its Catalan counterpart Convergence and Union (CiU), however, made significant gains in the Socialist stronghold of Catalonia, dramatically closing the gap with the Socialists' Party of Catalonia (PSC) to just 9 points from a 23-point lead in 1982. The newly formed United Left) coalition was able to slightly improve over the Communist Party of Spain (PCE)'s result in 1982, despite the split of former party leader Santiago Carrillo's Communists' Unity Board (MUC), which was unable to gain parliamentary representation.

In the election aftermath, the People's Coalition found itself into a state of deep crisis after results showed it was unable to garner the support of the centre voters. The People's Democratic Party (PDP) immediately broke away from the Coalition after the election; its 21 MPs forming their own parliamentary caucus in the Congress of Deputies, thus reducing the Coalition's parliamentary strength to 84. Manuel Fraga would resign as People's Alliance (AP) leader after the party's disastrous results in the November 1986 Basque regional election, deepening a party crisis that would last until its refoundation into the People's Party (PP) in 1989.

=== Government formation ===
Investiture; Congress of Deputies; Nomination of Felipe González (PSOE)
Ballot →	23 July 1986
Required majority →	176 out of 350
Yes: • PSOE (184)	184 / 350
No: • AP–PL (73); • PDP (21); • CDS (19); • CiU (18); • IU (7); • EE (2); • CG (1); • PAR (1); • AIC (1); • UV (1)	144 / 350
Abstentions: • PNV (6)	6 / 350
Absentees: • AP (11); • HB (5)	16 / 350

=== 1987 motion of no confidence ===
Motion of no confidence Congress of Deputies; Nomination of Antonio Hernández Mancha (AP)
Ballot →	30 March 1987
Required majority →	176 out of 350
Yes: • AP (66); • UV (1)	67 / 350
No: • PSOE (181); • IU (6); • PNV (4); • EE (2); • AIC (1)	194 / 350
Abstentions: • PDP (20); • CiU (19); • CDS (16); • PL (9); • RD (2); • PD (2); • PAR (1); • CG (1); • Independent (1)	71 / 350
Absentees: • HB (5); • CDS (4); • PSOE (3); • EA (2); • AP (1); • PDP (1); • PL (1); • IU (1)	18 / 350

== Bibliography ==
Legislation

- Constitución Española (Constitution). Official State Gazette (in Spanish). 27 December 1978 [version as of 29 December 1978]. BOE-A-1978-31229.
- Ley 1/1983, de 5 de abril, sobre cambio de denominación de la actual provincia de Oviedo por la de provincia de Asturias (Law 1/1983). Official State Gazette (in Spanish). 5 April 1983. BOE-A-1983-9453.
- Ley Orgánica 5/1985, de 19 de junio, del Régimen Electoral General (Organic Law 5/1985). Official State Gazette (in Spanish). 19 June 1985 [version as of 20 June 1985]. BOE-A-1985-11672.
- Real Decreto 794/1986, de 22 de abril, de disolución del Congreso de los Diputados y del Senado y de convocatoria de elecciones (Royal Decree 794/1986). Official State Gazette (in Spanish). 22 April 1986. BOE-A-1986-10007.

Other

- Carreras de Odriozola, Albert; Tafunell Sambola, Xavier (2005) [1989]. Estadísticas históricas de España, siglos XIX-XX (PDF) (in Spanish). Vol. 1 (II ed.). Bilbao: Fundación BBVA. pp. 1072–1097. ISBN 84-96515-00-1. Archived from the original (PDF) on 24 September 2015.
- Juliá Díaz, Santos (1999). Un siglo de España. Política y sociedad (in Spanish). Madrid: Marcial Pons. ISBN 84-9537903-1.
- Ruiz González, David (2002). La España democrática (1975–2000). Política y sociedad (in Spanish). Madrid: Síntesis. ISBN 84-9756-015-9.
- Marín Arce, José María; Molinero i Ruiz, Carme; Ysàs i Solanes, Pere (2001). Historia política de España, 1939–2000, Volumen 2 (in Spanish). Madrid: Ediciones Akal. ISBN 84-7090-319-5.
