= Supervivientes: Expedición Robinson 2001 =

- Season 2
- Presented by: Paco Lobatón
- No. of days: 95
- No. of castaways: 16
- Winner: Alfredo "Freddy" Cortina
- Runner-up: Antonio "Amate" Amate
- Location: North and Silhouette islands, Seychelles
- No. of episodes: 14

Release
- Original network: Telecinco
- Original release: September 16 – December 20, 2001

Additional information
- Filming dates: September 9 – December 13, 2001

Season chronology
- ← Previous; 2000 Next → La Isla de los FamoS.O.S. 1

Supervivientes: Expedición Robinson 2001 is the second season of the show Supervivientes to air in Spain. It was broadcast on Telecinco from September 16, 2001 to December 20, 2001. This season took place on the island of Madagascar, off the coast of Africa.

== Season summary ==
For this season, the contestants were again initially divided into the North and South teams. In episode five, a tribal swap occurred, in which Alfredo "Freddy" Cortina and José "Kaky" Lópe swapped tribes. As part of this twist, neither could be voted out before the merge. When the tribes merged, for the first few days following the merge, there weren't any reward challenges, and following the acceptance of food from a native in episode 8, it was decided that none of the contestants would be immune at the eighth tribal council. When it came time for the final three, the contestants took part in two challenges in order to determine who would be the finalists. Ultimately, it was Alfredo "Freddy" Cortina who won this season over Antonio "Amate" Amate by 6 jury votes and took home the grand prize of 20,000,000 pesetas. Andrés was voted as the favourite contestants from this season with 37% of public votes, winning the prize of 3,000,000 pesetas.

== Finishing order ==
Contestant	Original tribe	Tribal swap	Merge tribe	Finish
María Teresa "Mayte" Portela; 38, Pontevedra	North Team			1st Voted Out; Day 7
Israel "Coco" Pallol; 27, Madrid	North Team			2nd Voted Out; Day 14
Rosa María "Rosy" Escobar; 35, Valencia	South Team			3rd Voted Out; Day 21
Egoitz Lorenzo; 24, Álava	North Team			Left Competition; Day 28
Domingo Alemán; 47, Gran Canaria	South Team			4th Voted Out; Day 35
Ricardo Agulló; 38, Madrid	North Team	North Team		5th Voted Out; Day 42
Adriana Ortemberg; 38, Barcelona	South Team	South Team	Robinson	6th Voted Out; Day 49
María Peñate; 34, Gran Canaria	South Team	South Team	Robinson	7th Voted Out; 1st Jury Member; Day 56
José "Kaky" López; 43, Cádiz	South Team	North Team	Robinson	8th Voted Out; 2nd Jury Member; Day 63
Amagoia Caño; 25, Guipúzcoa	North Team	North Team	Robinson	9th Voted Out; 3rd Jury Member; Day 70
Beatriz Sánchez; 28, Córdoba	South Team	South Team	Robinson	10th Voted Out; 4th Jury Member; Day 77
Francesca Caballería; 49, Tarragona	North Team	North Team	Robinson	11th Voted Out; 5th Jury Member; Day 84
Andrés Sanz; 28, Barcelona	South Team	South Team	Robinson	12th Voted Out; 6th Jury member Day 91
Esther Barcena; 21, Madrid	North Team	North Team	Robinson	Lost Challenge; 7th Jury Member; Day 95
Antonio "Amate" Amate; 49, Almería	South Team	South Team	Robinson	Runner-Up; Day 95
Alfredo "Freddy" Cortina; 26, Valencia	North Team	South Team	Robinson	Sole Survivor; Day 95

== Voting history ==
	Original Tribes					Swap	Merged Tribe									
Episode #:	1	2	3	4		5	6	7	8	9	10	11	12			
Eliminated:	Mayte; 5/8 votes	Coco; 6/7 votes	Rosy; 7/8 votes	Egoitz; No vote	Domingo; 6/7 votes	Ricardo; 3/5 votes^{1}	Adriana; 6/10 votes	María; 5/10 votes^{2}	Kaky; 4/8 votes	Amagoia; 4/7 votes	Beatriz; 4/6 votes	Francesca; 4/5 votes	Andrés; 4/5 votes^{3}	Esther; No vote	Amate; 1/7 votes	Freddy; 6/7 votes
Voter	Vote															
Freddy	Mayte	Coco					Adriana	Andrés	Andrés	Amagoia	Beatriz	Francesca	Andrés		Jury Vote	
Amate			Rosy		Domingo		María	María	Kaky	Amagoia	Beatriz	Francesca	Andrés		Jury Vote	
Esther	Mayte	Coco				Ricardo	Adriana	Andrés	Kaky	Amagoia	Beatriz	Francesca	Andrés			Freddy
Andrés			Rosy		Domingo		María	María	Kaky	Esther	Amate	Francesca	Amate		Amate	
Francesca	Mayte	Coco				Ricardo	Adriana	Esther	Kaky	Amagoia	Beatriz	Amate	Andrés			Freddy
Beatriz			Rosy		Domingo		María	María	Francesca	Esther	Amate					Freddy
Amagoia	Esther	Coco				Ricardo	Adriana	María	Francesca	Esther						Freddy
Kaky			Rosy		Domingo	Esther	Adriana	María	Francesca							Freddy
María			Rosy		Domingo		Adriana	Andrés								Freddy
Adriana			Rosy		Domingo		María	Francesca								
Ricardo	Mayte	Coco				Esther										
Domingo			Rosy		María											
Egoitz	Esther	Coco														
Rosy			Adriana													
Coco	Mayte	Esther														
Mayte	Esther															

^1 As Freddy and Kaky had swapped tribes in episode five, both were immune at the fifth tribal council if their new tribe lost the immunity challenge.

^2 Adriana could cast a black vote at the seventh tribal council.

^3 Francesca could cast a black vote at the twelfth tribal council.
