= 1986 Spanish NATO membership referendum =

- 12 March 1986
- The Government considers it convenient, for national interests, for Spain to remain in the Atlantic Alliance, and agrees that such permanence be established in the following terms: (1) Non-incorporation into NATO's military structure; (2) Prohibition on the installation, storage or entry of nuclear weapons on Spanish territory; (3) Gradual reduction of the United States' military presence in Spain. In your view, should Spain continue to be a member of the Atlantic Alliance subject to the terms agreed by the national Government?

Results
| Choice | Votes | % |
|---|---|---|
| Yes | 9,054,509 | 56.85% |
| No | 6,872,421 | 43.15% |
| Valid votes | 15,926,930 | 92.35% |
| Invalid or blank votes | 1,319,522 | 7.65% |
| Total votes | 17,246,452 | 100.00% |
| Registered voters/turnout | 29,024,494 | 59.42% |
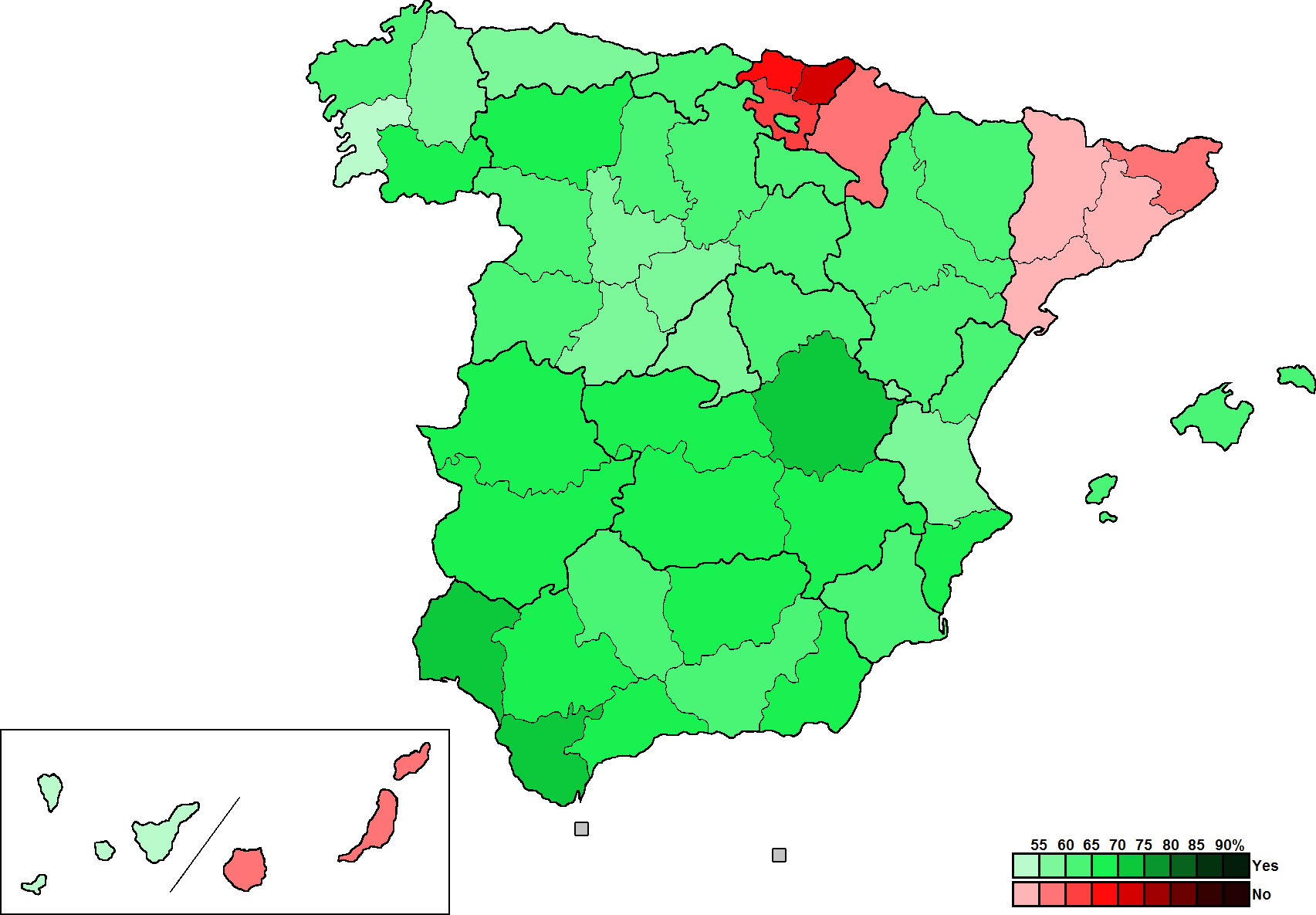
- Results by provinces
- Provincial results map for the referendum

A referendum on the Spanish NATO membership was held in Spain on Wednesday, 12 March 1986. Voters were asked whether they ratified the national Government's proposal for the country remaining a member of the North Atlantic Treaty Organization (NATO), which it had joined in 1982.

The question asked was "The Government considers it convenient, for national interests, for Spain to remain in the Atlantic Alliance, and agrees that such permanence be established in the following terms: (1) Non-incorporation into NATO's military structure; (2) Prohibition on the installation, storage or entry of nuclear weapons on Spanish territory; (3) Gradual reduction of the United States' military presence in Spain. Question: In your view, should Spain continue to be a member of the Atlantic Alliance subject to the terms agreed by the national Government?" (Spanish: El Gobierno considera conveniente, para los intereses nacionales, que España permanezca en la Alianza Atlántica, y acuerda que dicha permanencia se establezca en los siguientes términos: 1.º La participación de España en la Alianza Atlántica no incluirá su incorporación a la estructura militar integrada. 2.º Se mantendrá la prohibición de instalar, almacenar o introducir armas nucleares en territorio español. 3.º Se procederá a la reducción progresiva de la presencia militar de los Estados Unidos en España. ¿Considera conveniente para España permanecer en la Alianza Atlántica en los términos acordados por el Gobierno de la Nación?).

The referendum resulted in 56.9% of valid votes in favour of remaining within NATO on a turnout of 59.4%.

== Party positions ==
=== Position of political parties ===
| Choice | | |
|---|---|---|
| Yes | Spanish Socialist Workers' Party (Note: PSOE previously opposed membership in NATO, but shifted to a positive vote in the referendum.) | Social democracy |
| Free choice | Democratic and Social Centre | Liberalism |
| Free choice | Convergence and Union | Catalan nationalism |
| Free choice | Democratic Reformist Party | Liberalism |
| Free choice | Basque Nationalist Party | Basque nationalism Christian democracy |
| No | Communist Party of Spain | Eurocommunism |
| No | Unified Socialist Party of Catalonia | Eurocommunism |
| No | Republican Left of Catalonia | Catalan nationalism Left-wing nationalism |
| No | Herri Batasuna | Abertzale left Revolutionary socialism |
| No | Euskadiko Ezkerra | Abertzale left Democratic socialism |
| No | Party of the Communists of Catalonia | Communism |
| No | Valencian People's Union | Valencian nationalism Socialism |
| No | Left Nationalists | Catalan nationalism Socialism |
| Blank | People's Coalition (Spain) | Conservatism |

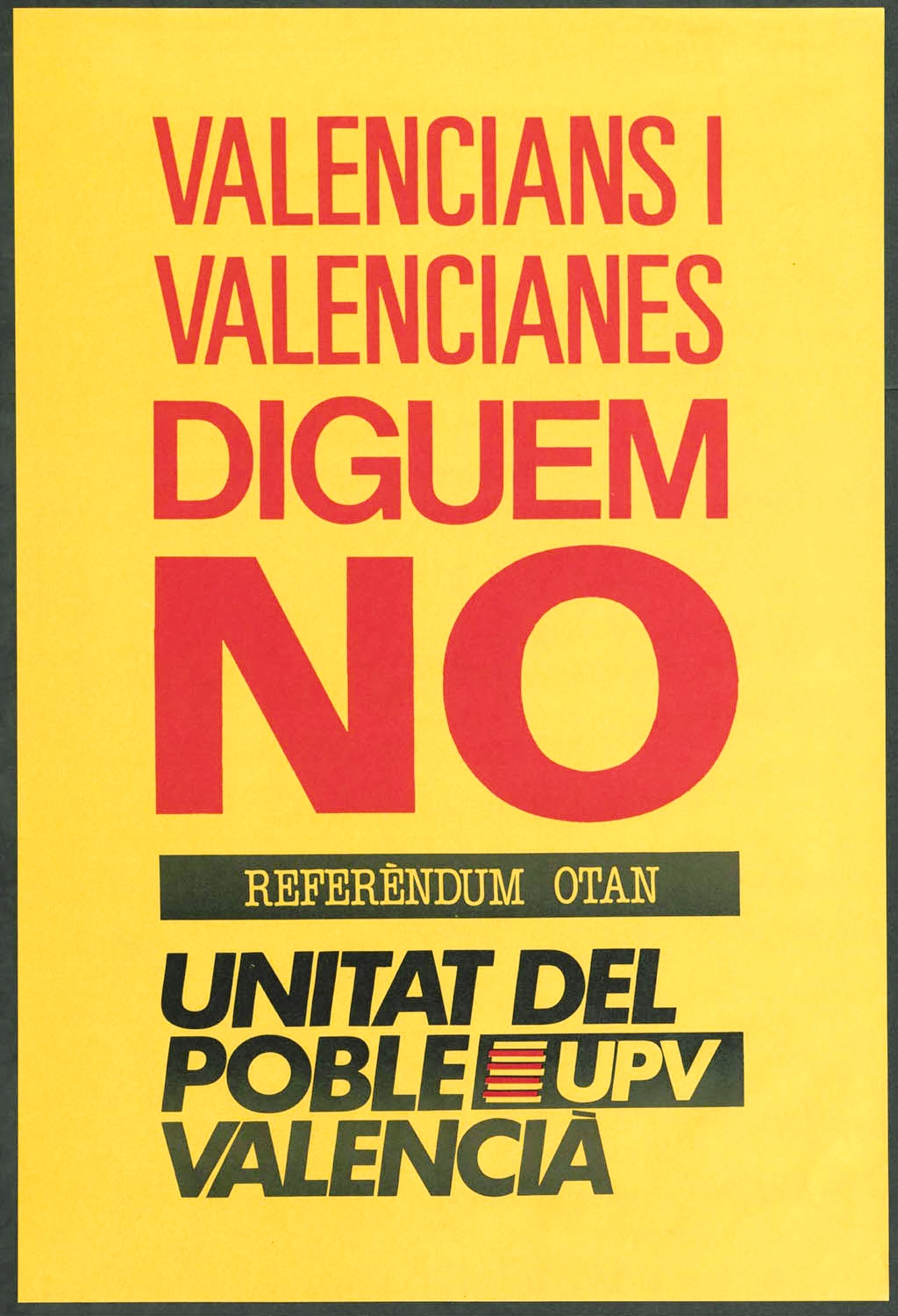
A poster of the Valencian People's Union urging for a 'No' vote.

A Herri Batasuna sticker reading "OTAN ez" (No NATO).

The Spanish Socialist Workers' Party (PSOE), historically opposed to NATO, campaigned for a 'Yes' vote. The People's Coalition, the main right-wing party, was pro-NATO, but campaigned for a blank vote, because they did not agree to PSOE holding a referendum. The Communist Party (PCE) organised much of the 'No' campaign. The confluence of left-wing parties for the 'No' vote laid the groundwork for the United Left alliance, which was launched in time for the general election later that year. The centrist parties did not take clear stances, including the moderate nationalist parties. The left-wing nationalist parties strongly rejected remaining within NATO.

== Opinion polls ==
The table below lists voting intention estimates in reverse chronological order, showing the most recent first and using the dates when the survey fieldwork was done, as opposed to the date of publication. Where the fieldwork dates are unknown, the date of publication is given instead. The highest percentage figure in each polling survey is displayed with its background shaded in the leading choice's colour. The "Lead" column on the right shows the percentage-point difference between the "Remain" and "Leave" choices in a given poll.

| Polling firm/Commissioner | Fieldwork date | Sample size | Remain | Leave | Invalid/ Blank | X mark | Question | Lead | Notes |
|---|---|---|---|---|---|---|---|---|---|
| 1986 referendum | 12 Mar 1986 | —N/a | 31.2 | 23.7 | 4.5 | 40.6 | – | 7.5 | |
| CIS | 10–11 Mar 1986 | 1,188 | 33.0 | 27.0 | 3.0 | 12.0 | 25.0 | 5.0 | (Note: Respondents were asked on how they would vote based on the actual referendum question: "In your view, should Spain continue to be a member of the Atlantic Alliance subject to the terms agreed by the national Government?") |
| CIS | 7 Mar 1986 | 2,410 | 31.0 | 29.0 | 2.0 | 11.0 | 27.0 | 2.0 | |
| ECO/CIS | 3–4 Mar 1986 | 2,500 | 27.0 | 35.0 | – | 12.0 | 26.0 | 8.0 | |
| Alef/El País | 28 Feb–3 Mar 1986 | 3,000 | 26.2 | 36.2 | 37.6 | | | 10.0 | |
| Sofemasa/La Vanguardia | 25–28 Feb 1986 | 3,100 | 24.8 | 35.5 | 2.6 | 12.3 | 24.8 | 10.7 | |
| CIS | 27 Feb 1986 | ? | 29.0 | 28.0 | 2.0 | 13.0 | 24.0 | 1.0 | |
| Alef/El País | 18–20 Feb 1986 | 1,525 | 25.2 | 34.2 | 3.6 | 19.1 | 17.9 | 9.0 | |
| CIS | 15–19 Feb 1986 | 2,500 | 27.0 | 31.0 | 2.0 | 12.0 | 29.0 | 4.0 | |
| CIS | 15 Feb 1986 | ? | 25.0 | 32.0 | – | 12.0 | 32.0 | 7.0 | |
| CIS | 10 Feb 1986 | ? | 25.0 | 27.0 | – | 15.0 | 33.0 | 2.0 | |
| ECO/CIS | 7–10 Feb 1986 | ? | 30.0 | 38.0 | – | 13.0 | 19.0 | 8.0 | |
| Alef/El País | 2–4 Feb 1986 | 1,532 | 21.0 | 39.0 | 3.1 | 18.5 | 18.4 | 18.0 | |
| CIS | 18–25 Jan 1986 | 10,632 | 30.0 | 28.0 | – | 10.0 | 32.0 | 2.0 | (Note: Respondents were asked "If at the time of holding the referendum, the Government had secured a reduction of the American bases in Spain, would you vote For or Against of Spain remaining a NATO member outside the Military Structure?") |
| CIS | 1 Jan 1986 | ? | 29.0 | 27.0 | – | 12.0 | 32.0 | 2.0 | |
| CIS | 13–16 Dec 1985 | 2,457 | 32.0 | 27.0 | – | 10.0 | 31.0 | 5.0 | |
| CIS | 1 Oct 1985 | 1,232 | 30.0 | 25.0 | – | 9.0 | 36.0 | 5.0 | |
| CIS | 17–20 Jul 1985 | 2,479 | 26.0 | 34.0 | – | 7.0 | 33.0 | 8.0 | |
| CIS | 7–11 Jun 1985 | 3,435 | 24.0 | 34.0 | – | 9.0 | 33.0 | 10.0 | |
| CIS | 10 Sep 1984 | ? | 25.0 | 47.0 | – | 1.0 | 27.0 | 22.0 | (Note: Respondents were asked "If the NATO referendum was held tomorrow, would you vote For or Against Spain leaving NATO completely?" As permanence within NATO was asked conversely to other questions, "For" and "Against" results have been assigned to Leave and Remain, respectively, to maintain consistency.) |
| CIS | 10 Sep 1984 | ? | 31.0 | 42.0 | – | 9.0 | 18.0 | 11.0 | (Note: Respondents were asked "If the NATO referendum was held tomorrow, would you vote For or Against Spain remaining a NATO member but outside the Military Structure?") |
| CIS | 10 Sep 1984 | ? | 19.0 | 57.0 | – | 9.0 | 15.0 | 38.0 | (Note: Respondents were asked "If the NATO referendum was held tomorrow, would you vote For or Against Spain joining NATO Military Structure?") |
| CIS | 1 Sep 1984 | 2,466 | 22.0 | 35.0 | – | 7.0 | 36.0 | 13.0 | |
| CIS | 1 Sep 1984 | 2,466 | 22.0 | 34.0 | – | 7.0 | 37.0 | 12.0 | |
| CIS | 1 Sep 1984 | 2,466 | 15.0 | 44.0 | – | 7.0 | 34.0 | 29.0 | |
| CIS | 25–28 Apr 1984 | 2,474 | 20.0 | 43.0 | – | 6.0 | 31.0 | 23.0 | |
| CIS | 25–28 Apr 1984 | 2,474 | 19.0 | 46.0 | – | 7.0 | 29.0 | 27.0 | |
| CIS | 25–28 Apr 1984 | 2,474 | 11.0 | 54.0 | – | 6.0 | 29.0 | 43.0 | |
| CIS | 1 Jan 1984 | 2,495 | 19.4 | 40.9 | – | 8.4 | 31.3 | 21.5 | |
| CIS | 1 Jan 1984 | 2,495 | 21.6 | 38.5 | – | 8.5 | 31.5 | 16.9 | |
| CIS | 1 Jan 1984 | 2,495 | 13.6 | 50.3 | – | 7.6 | 28.4 | 36.7 | |
| CIS | 9–13 Nov 1983 | 2,476 | 15.0 | 44.0 | – | 9.0 | 32.0 | 29.0 | (Note: Respondents were asked "If a referendum was held tomorrow, would you vote For or Against a definitive incorporation to NATO?") |
| CIS | 1 Mar 1983 | 2,488 | 12.6 | 49.2 | – | 8.1 | 30.2 | 36.6 | |
| CIS | 9–11 Sep 1981 | 1,193 | 12.0 | 37.0 | – | 11.0 | 40.0 | 25.0 | (Note: Respondents were asked "If there were a referendum on the entry of Spain into NATO, how would you vote?" and given the options of "For" and "Against".) |

== Results ==
=== Overall ===
Question

The Government considers it convenient, for national interests, for Spain to remain in the Atlantic Alliance, and agrees that such permanence be established in the following terms: (1) Non-incorporation into NATO's military structure; (2) Prohibition on the installation, storage or entry of nuclear weapons on Spanish territory; (3) Gradual reduction of the United States' military presence in Spain. In your view, should Spain continue to be a member of the Atlantic Alliance subject to the terms agreed by the national Government?

| Choice | Votes | % |
|---|---|---|
| For | 9,054,509 | 56.85 |
| Against | 6,872,421 | 43.15 |
| Total | 15,926,930 | 100.00 |
| Valid votes | 15,926,930 | 92.35 |
| Invalid/blank votes | 1,319,522 | 7.65 |
| Total votes | 17,246,452 | 100.00 |
| Registered voters/turnout | 29,024,494 | 59.42 |
Source: Ministry of the Interior

=== Results by region ===
| Region | Electorate | Turnout | Yes | | No | |
| Region | Electorate | Turnout | Votes | % | Votes | % |
|---|---|---|---|---|---|---|
| Andalusia | 4,810,221 | 61.55 | 1,868,623 | 67.38 | 904,635 | 32.62 |
| Aragon | 952,361 | 60.17 | 318,640 | 61.72 | 197,608 | 38.28 |
| Asturias | 907,599 | 56.36 | 273,074 | 57.28 | 203,622 | 42.72 |
| Balearic Islands | 524,710 | 52.03 | 151,881 | 61.11 | 96,663 | 38.89 |
| Basque Country | 1,644,108 | 65.41 | 336,518 | 32.45 | 700,539 | 67.55 |
| Canary Islands | 1,003,385 | 55.39 | 242,015 | 46.31 | 280,639 | 53.69 |
| Cantabria | 402,339 | 59.64 | 140,251 | 63.96 | 79,031 | 36.04 |
| Castile and León | 2,071,409 | 56.44 | 627,633 | 61.54 | 392,251 | 38.46 |
| Castilla–La Mancha | 1,283,563 | 58.30 | 451,729 | 68.42 | 208,484 | 31.58 |
| Catalonia | 4,614,731 | 62.80 | 1,263,416 | 46.28 | 1,466,639 | 53.72 |
| Extremadura | 823,281 | 61.96 | 305,219 | 65.79 | 158,723 | 34.21 |
| Galicia | 2,220,686 | 38.51 | 465,103 | 59.10 | 321,809 | 40.90 |
| La Rioja | 202,523 | 59.97 | 69,405 | 63.92 | 39,174 | 36.08 |
| Madrid | 3,591,044 | 60.91 | 1,135,636 | 56.77 | 864,700 | 43.23 |
| Murcia | 723,287 | 61.39 | 254,572 | 62.08 | 155,469 | 37.92 |
| Navarre | 396,841 | 62.64 | 99,815 | 43.28 | 130,828 | 56.72 |
| Valencian Community | 2,776,354 | 66.33 | 1,027,648 | 60.73 | 664,465 | 39.27 |
| Total | 29,024,494 | 59.42 | 9,054,509 | 56.85 | 6,872,421 | 43.15 |
