= Supervivientes: Expedición Robinson 2000 =

- Season 1
- Presented by: Juan Manuel López Iturriaga
- No. of days: 47
- No. of castaways: 16
- Winner: Xavier Monjonell
- Runner-up: María Elena García
- Location: Bastimentos, Panama
- No. of episodes: 13

Release
- Original network: Telecinco
- Original release: September 10 – December 3, 2000

Additional information
- Filming dates: April 9 – May 25, 2000

Season chronology
- Next → 2001

Supervivientes: Expedición Robinson 2000 is the first season of the show Supervivientes to air in Spain. It was broadcast on Telecinco from September 10, 2000 to December 3, 2000. This season took place in Panama.

== Season summary ==
For this season, the contestants were initially divided into the North and South teams. During the pre-merge portion of this season, an item known as the talisman came into play whenever a player was eliminated. When a player was voted out of the game, they could leave the talisman to any tribe member of their choice. Despite her initial elimination from the game in episode three, Ana Maria Fernandez was allowed to return to the game, only this time as a replacement on the North team for Juan Antonio Ruiz who was forced to leave the game for health reasons. When the tribes merged, for the first few days following the merge there weren't any immunity challenges. When it came time for the final four, the contestants took part in two challenges in order to determine who would be the finalists. Ultimately, it was Xavier Monjonell who won this season over María Elena García by an unknown jury vote and took home the grand prize of 10,000,000 pesetas.

== Finishing order ==
Contestant	Original tribe	Episode 4 tribe	Merge tribe	Finish
María Elena Alconchel; 22, Granada	North Team			1st Voted Out; Day 4
Jane Young; 53, Barcelona	North Team			2nd Voted Out; Day 8
Juan Antonio Ruiz; 39, Sevilla	North Team			Evacuated; Day 9
Eduard Salas; 34, Barcelona	North Team	North Team		4th Voted Out; Day 13
Verónica Valverde; 24, Madrid	South Team	South Team		5th Voted Out; Day 17
Sacha de Ignacio; 24, Oviedo	South Team	South Team		6th Voted Out; Day 21
Iratxe Luengas; 24, Vizcaya	North Team	North Team	Robinson	7th Voted Out; Day 25
Jesús María Pérez; 33, Málaga	South Team	South Team	Robinson	8th Voted Out; 1st Jury Member; Day 29
Susana Redondo; 33, Madrid	South Team	South Team	Robinson	9th Voted Out; 2nd Jury Member; Day 33
Carlos Bolopo; 31, Barcelona	South Team	South Team	Robinson	10th Voted Out; 3rd Jury Member; Day 34
Jonathan García; 25, Madrid	North Team	North Team	Robinson	11th Voted Out; 4th Jury Member; Day 42
Víctor Bodas; 45, Madrid	South Team	South Team	Robinson	12th Voted Out; 5th Jury Member; Day 45
Ana María Fernández; 27, A Coruña	South Team	North Team	Robinson	3rd and 13th Voted Out; 6th Jury member Day 9 / Day 47
Aketxa Sánchez; 24, Vizcaya	South Team	South Team	Robinson	14th Voted Out; 7th Jury Member; Day 47
María Elena García; 25, Madrid	North Team	North Team	Robinson	Runner-Up; Day 47
Xavier Monjonell; 27, Gerona	North Team	North Team	Robinson	Sole Survivor; Day 47

== Voting history ==
	Original Tribes				Swapped tribes			Merged Tribe									
Episode #:	1	2	3		4	5	6	7	8	9	10	11	12	13			
Eliminated:	Elena; 6/8 votes	Jane; 4/7 votes	Juan A. No vote^{1}	Ana Mª; 4/8 votes	Eduard; 5/6 votes	Verónica; 5/7 votes	Sacha; 4/6 votes	Iratxe; 4/10 votes	Jesús; 5/9 votes	Susana; 7/8 votes	Carlos; 4/7 votes	Jonathan; 4/6 votes	Víctor; 4/5 votes	Ana Mª; 1 vote	Aketza; 1 vote	María; 2/7 votes	Xavier; 5/7 votes
Voter	Vote																
Xavier	Elena	Jane			Eduard			Jonathan	Jesús	Susana	Carlos	Jonathan	Víctor	Ana Mª		Jury Vote	
María	Elena	Jane			Eduard			Jonathan	Jesús	Susana	Carlos	Jonathan	Víctor		Aketza	Jury Vote	
Aketza				Ana Mª		Carlos	Carlos	Carlos	Carlos	Susana	Carlos	Jonathan	Víctor				Xavier
Ana Mª				Carlos	Eduard			Carlos	Jesús	Susana	Víctor	Xavier	Víctor			María	
Víctor				Susana		Verónica	Sacha	Iratxe	Jesús	Susana	Ana Mª	Jonathan	María				Xavier
Jonathan	Elena	Iratxe			Eduard			Iratxe	Jesús	Susana	Carlos	Víctor				María	
Carlos				Ana Mª		Verónica	Sacha	Iratxe	María	Susana	Víctor						Xavier
Susana				Ana Mª		Verónica	Sacha	María	María	Jonathan							Xavier
Jesús				Sacha		Verónica	Sacha	Iratxe	María								Xavier
Iratxe	Elena	Jane			Eduard			Carlos									
Sacha				Jesús		Verónica	Carlos										
Verónica				Ana Mª		Carlos											
Eduard	Elena	Juan A.			Iratxe												
Juan A.	Elena	Jane															
Jane	Juan A.	Jonathan															
Elena	Jane																

^1 Juan Antonio had to quit the game for medical reasons. To replace him the eliminated contestant from this episode would come back to the game. Ana Mª was eliminated with 4 votes but she replaced Juan Antonio and swapped tribes.
