= Mocidades Galeguistas =

Mocidades Galeguistas Galicianist Youth
- Founded: 1987
- Headquarters: Pontevedra, Galicia
- Ideology: Galician nationalism Liberalism; Social liberalism Federalism
- Mother party: Galician Nationalist Party-Galicianist Party

Mocidades Galeguistas (in English language: Galicianist Youth, MMGG) or, also used until 1989, Mocidades Nacionalistas Galegas (in English language: Galician Nationalist Youth, MNG) is a political youth organization of Galicia, with a Galician nationalist and social liberal ideology. The organization defends a liberal Galicia in a federal Spain.

== History ==
MMGG was founded in 1987 as the youth of the Galician Nationalist Party-Galicianist Party (PNG-PG), with the merge of the previous Mocedades Galeguistas (the youth wing of the Partido Galeguista (Nationalist)) and a sector of the Galician Nationalist Youth(the youth wing of Galician Coalition). In 2002 after an internal crisis in the party the PNG-PG declared that MMGG were no longer their youth wing, but finally the measure wasn't put into practice. In 2012 the MMGG left the Galician Nationalist Bloc, and helped to create Compromiso por Galicia. Since that same year MMGG has had almost no public appearances or act, nor internet activity. The last thing done by the organization was its journal Terra Celta (Celtic Land) in April 2012. The organization hasn't officially dissolved.
