= Miquel Roca =

Spanish lawyer and politician (born 1940)

The Most Excellent Miquel Roca
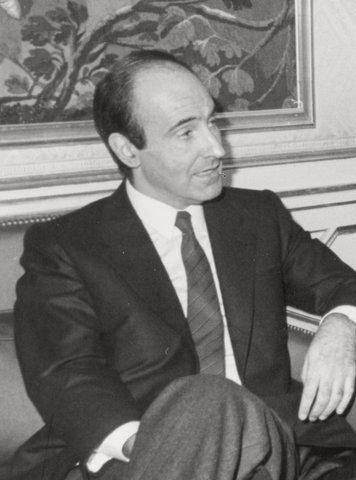

Councillor in Barcelona
- In office 15 June 1995 – 13 June 1999

Member of the Congress of Deputies
- In office 15 June 1977 – 31 January 1995
- Constituency: Barcelona

Personal details
- Born: Miquel Roca Junyent; 20 April 1940 (age 85) Bordeaux, France
- Party: Democratic Convergence of Catalonia (1974–2016); Democratic Reformist Party (1983–1986)

Miquel Roca Junyent (Bordeaux, France, 20 April 1940) is a Spanish lawyer and politician from Democratic Convergence of Catalonia. He is one of the Fathers of the Constitution in Spain.

== Early life ==
Miquel Roca i Junyent was descendant to two Catalan bourgeoisie families. His paternal grandfather, Ramon Roca Masferrer (1861–1932), was a prestigious personality in the world of Barcelona editors, arts and culture; his maternal grandfather, Miguel Junyent Rovira (1871–1936), was a Barcelona publisher and Carlist politician. He was born in Bordeaux as his father, Juan Bautista Roca Caball (1898–1976) left Catalonia during the Civil War.

== Career ==
In his youth, Roca joined forces with other future Catalan politicians, such as Narcís Serra and Pasqual Maragall, in the Front Obrer de Catalunya, an illegal left-wing organization made up mostly by university students linked to the Popular Liberation Front (FELIPE).

Later in his life, Roca turned to liberal ideas. He was a founding member of Democratic Convergence of Catalonia in 1974, where he served as the adjunct to the Secretary-General. He was elected to the first democratic parliament after the Francoist dictatorship for the district of Barcelona, where he held his seat from 1977 to 1995 in representation of Convergence and Union. He soon became the leader and speaker of the Catalan Minority in Congress.

From 1982 to 1995, Roca represented the Generalitat, Catalonia's devolved regional administration, in the Committee for Bilateral Co-operation with the Spanish government. During this period, he failed in his attempt to create a centrist party to act as a counterweight between the conservative People's Alliance and the social-democratic PSOE, a plan known as Operation Roca.

Roca was the CiU candidate to become the Mayor of Barcelona in 1995, a position he accepted on the advice of then-President of the Generalitat Jordi Pujol. Despite his popularity, he lost by a considerable margin against incumbent Pasqual Maragall, a former correligionary of Roca. He took a post in the insurance company Catalana Occidente soon thereafter. In addition, he runs his own law firm and works as an associate professor of Constitutional Law at Pompeu Fabra University. He is also an honorary board member of various Spanish companies.

== Later career ==
Roca was hired by the Spanish royal family to defend Cristina de Borbón in the judicial procedures against her in the Noos case. In May 2016, judge José Castro denounced pressures by Roca and his law firm to have a meeting in order to acquit Borbón from all charges pressed against her.

In October 2025, King Felipe VI named him Knight of the Order of the Golden Fleece.

== Other activities ==
- ACS Group, Independent Member of the Board of Directors (since 2003)
