= Democratic Reformist Party =

Defunct political party in Spain

Democratic Reformist Party Partido Reformista Democrático
- Leader: Miquel Roca
- President: Antonio Garrigues Walker
- Secretary-General: Florentino Pérez
- Founded: 1983
- Dissolved: 1986
- Headquarters: Madrid
- Ideology: Liberalism; Social liberalism Centrism
- Political position: Centre

The Democratic Reformist Party (Partido Reformista Democrático in Spanish) was a Spanish political party led by Miquel Roca founded in 1983. It was supported by the Liberal Democratic Party (PLD) of Antonio Garrigues Walker, the Riojan Progressive Party (PRP) and the Majorcan Union. It was known as "Operation Roca", referring to its main leader and candidate for Prime Minister, Miquel Roca i Junyent. The party ran in all of Spain, with the exception of Galicia, where it was represented by Galician Coalition (CG), and Catalonia, where its representative was Convergence and Union (CiU).

The party got 194,538 votes (0.96%) in the 1986 general election, failing to gain any seats. Due to this defeat, the party dissolved itself in 1986.

== History ==
The Democratic Reformist Party was born in 1983 as a political operation undertaken by politicians from Convergence and Union (CiU) and the former Union of the Democratic Centre (UCD) for the 1986 general election. This project soon received the name of "Operation Roca" by the name of one of its promoters, the Catalan politician Miquel Roca, although there were other promoters such as the former president of the General Council of the Judiciary, Federico Carlos Sainz de Robles y Rodríguez, as well as lawyers, businessmen, etc. From the journalistic world the project had the support of the Diario 16 newspaper and of its then director, Pedro J. Ramírez. The PRD was officially registered on 11 March 1983 while on May 19, its first foundational meeting was held, with the participation of members of the Majorcan Union, Canarian Convergence, the Independent Group of Almería, and Galician Coalition; and its first “summit” took place on 5 July with representatives from 25 provinces in attendance.

The reformist operation also had the support of the banking sector, and of the employers, especially the Spanish Confederation of Employers' Organizations (CEOE), whose president promised the PRD economic support for the electoral campaign worth 16,000 million pesetas.

Despite its supposed centrist and liberal character, for many potential voters the PRD was too identified with Catalan politics and presented a very confusing political profile. Certainly the leaders of the party sinned of optimism, since they considered that Felipe González’s PSOE would not manage to obtain the absolute majority and that the People’s Alliance (AP) of Manuel Fraga had reached its peak. In fact, one of the premises of the PRD was that it could subtract votes and seats from two of the parties allied with AP, the People's Democratic Party (PDP) of Oscar Alzaga and the Liberal Party.

The party celebrated its constituent congress from 23–25 November 1984, when Antonio Garrigues Walker was elected as its president.

== Electoral performance ==
=== Cortes Generales ===
Cortes Generales
Election	Leading candidate	Congress			Senate			Gov.
Election	Leading candidate	Votes	%	Seats	Votes	%	Seats	Gov.
1986	Miquel Roca	194,538	1.0 (#9)	0 / 350	514,504	0.9 (#9)	0 / 208	—

Facing the elections the party stood in all provinces except in Catalonia and Galicia, where their referents were Convergence and Union (CiU) and Galician Coalition (CG), respectively. Paradoxically, although Miquel Roca was presented to the elections as the Prime Ministerial candidate, Roca ran under the CiU banner, not the PRD one. On the day of the elections, the Democratic Reformist Party obtained some 194,538 votes (0.96% of the total votes cast), although no seats. In addition, the PSOE revalidated its absolute majority and there was no leak from AP. Convergence and Union (CiU) did manage to obtain good results in Catalonia, reaching 30% of the vote in the Province of Barcelona and 41% in the Province of Girona. Galician Coalition also managed to elect one deputy. The results were an absolute failure for the PRD. It was also a failure for CiU, which although considerably improved its results in Catalonia, saw its political operation frustrated in the rest of Spain. Given the poor results obtained, the party was practically dissolved on the same night of the elections; On the other hand, Convergence and Union ignored the situation (Roca even refused to appear in public for the results) and broke with the reformist project.

Although the remaining parties survived the reformist operation, Garrigues Walker's Liberal Democratic Party (PDL) disappeared. The executive committee of the PRD, which was headed by Garrigues himself, resigned from the party on 26 September 1986.
