= Galician Coalition =

Galician Coalition Coalición Galega
- Leader: José Domingo Posada González
- Founded: 1983; 2015 (refoundation)
- Dissolved: 2012
- Merger of: Sectors of the UCD, Galician Independent Party, Centristas de Ourense and the majority of the Partido Galeguista.
- Youth wing: Mocidades Galeguistas
- Ideology: Galician nationalism Liberalism; Christian democracy Confederalism
- Political position: Centre

Website
- www.coaliciongalega.es

Galician Coalition (Galician: Coalición Galega, CG) is a political party in Galicia, Spain with a Galician nationalist and centrist ideology. Since 2012 CG is part of the coalition Compromiso por Galicia.

== History ==
=== Coalition ===
CG was born as an electoral coalition for the municipal elections of 1983, formed by the Partido Galeguista (PG) and ex-members of the UCD after the disaster of the party in the 1982 elections. In A Coruña and Lugo the candidacy was called "Partido Galeguista-Converxencia de Independientes de Galicia" and in Ourense "Partido Galeguista-Centristas de Ourense". In the Province of Pontevedra the PG and the ex-members of the UCD presented separated lists.

=== Foundation and evolution of the party ===
The good results of the elections (125,000 votes) in 1984 led to coalition to transform itself into a moderate, centrist nationalist party, but maintaining a clientelist structure in rural areas of the provinces of Ourense and Lugo, inherited from the UCD.

In the elections of 1985, under the leadership of Pablo González Mariñas and with the active support of CiU, CG won 163,425 votes (13%). After the elections there were two sectors in the party: one that wanted a pact with the right (People's Alliance) and other that wanted a pact with the left (Socialists' Party of Galicia and the Galician Socialist Party-Galician Left). The sector that wanted a pact with People's Alliance (AP) was the majority, and finally CG entered the government of Xerardo Fernández Albor.

In the Spanish elections of 1986, CG obtained one deputy (Senen Bernárdez), the first Galician nationalist deputy in the Congreso de los Diputados since the Second Republic.

=== Split and decline ===
In January 1987, the most nationalist and progressive sectors of CG, led by Pablo González Mariñas and Xosé Henrique Rodríguez Peña, left the party and formed the Galician Nationalist Party (which would eventually join the Galician Nationalist Bloc). To attend the 1987 municipal elections, CG formed the Galician Progressive Coalition, with the Democratic Popular Party (PDP) and the Liberal Party, gaining the 11.07% of the vote and 607 councilors. Following the departure of Xosé Luís Barreiro of the People's Party of Galicia in September 1987, CG entered the new Galician government led by the socialist Fernando González Laxe.

In the elections of 1989, CG suffered a strong electoral setback to get only 48,208 votes (3.6%) and two seats. In the municipal elections of 1991 CG made a coalition with Centrists of Galicia, known as Galician Nationalist Convergence in the provinces of A Coruña, Lugo and Pontevedra, while in Ourense CG presented common lists with the Democratic and Social Centre.

In the elections of 1993, CG lost parliamentary representation and only obtained 6,098 votes (0.42%).

=== New projects and dissolution ===
In 2005, CG was one of the parties that created Terra Galega. In 2012, Terra Galega entered Compromiso por Galicia (CxG), but left months later due to the poor results in the Galician elections of the same year and disagreements in the political line. CG chose to continue in CxG and left Terra Galega. The integration in CxG led to the dissolution of CG.

== Election results ==
=== Galician Parliament ===
Galician Parliament
Election	Votes	%	Seats won	Government	Leader
1985	163,425	12.9	11 / 71	Gov't support	Pablo González Mariñas
1989	157,859	3.6	2 / 75	Opposition	Xosé Luís Barreiro
1993	6,098	0.4	0 / 75	No seats	

=== Congress of Deputies ===
Congress of Deputies
Election	Spain			Galicia			Government
Election	Votes	%	Seats won	Votes	%	Seats won	Government
1986	79.972	0.4	1 / 350	79.972	6.24	1 / 27	Opposition
1989	45,821	0.2	0 / 350	45,821	3.4	0 / 27	No seats

=== Local councils ===
Local councils
Election	Spain			Galicia		
Election	Votes	%	Seats won	Votes	%	Seats won
1983	180,946	1.01	907 / 67,312	180,946	14.80	907 / 4,033
2003	3,587	0.02	12 / 65,510	3,587	0.21	12 / 3,873
2015	317	0.00	0 / 67,515	317	0.03	0 / 3,766

== Bibliography ==
- Beramendi, X.G. and Núñez Seixas, X.M. (1996): O nacionalismo galego. A Nosa Terra, Vigo
- Beramendi, X.G. (2007): De provincia a nación. Historia do galeguismo político. Xerais, Vigo
