= Paco Lobatón =

Spanish journalist

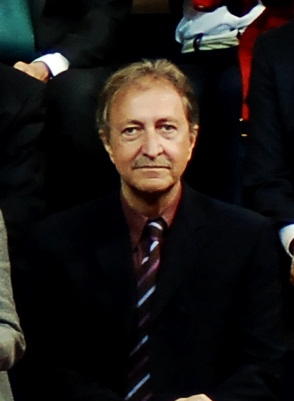
- Lobatón in 2012
- Born: Francisco de Asís Lobatón Sánchez de Medina; 6 December 1951 (age 74); Jerez de la Frontera (Cádiz), Spain
- Occupation: Journalist
- Spouse: Mari Pau Domínguez

Francisco de Asís Lobatón Sánchez de Medina (b. Jerez de la Frontera, Cádiz, 6 December 1951), better known as Paco Lobatón, is a Spanish journalist.

Between March 2015 and 2016 he run the section Ventana QSD in the Televisión Española program Las mañanas de La 1 alongside Mariló Montero. He promoted the Fundación Europea por las Personas Desaparecidas. In 2015 he won the "Special" Ciudad de Jerez Award.
