= Leadership opinion polling for the 2000 Spanish general election =

In the run up to the 2000 Spanish general election, various organisations carried out opinion polling to gauge the opinions that voters hold towards political leaders. Results of such polls are displayed in this article. The date range for these opinion polls is from the previous general election, held on 3 March 1996, to the day the next election was held, on 12 March 2000.

== Preferred prime minister ==
The table below lists opinion polling on leader preferences to become prime minister.

=== Aznar vs. Almunia ===
Polling firm/Commissioner	Fieldwork date	Sample size			Other/ None/ Not care	Question	Lead
Polling firm/Commissioner	Fieldwork date	Sample size	Aznar PP	Almunia PSOE	Other/ None/ Not care	Question	Lead
Vox Pública/El Periódico	28 Feb–1 Mar 2000	2,300	47.3	34.0	6.3	12.4	13.3
Opina/La Vanguardia	24–28 Feb 2000	3,000	40.5	35.4	4.6	19.5	5.1
CIS	11–28 Feb 2000	24,040	43.7	30.5	18.3	7.5	13.2
ASEP	14–19 Feb 2000	1,214	37.1	30.1	17.1	15.8	7.0
Vox Pública/El Periódico	5–8 Feb 2000	2,300	50.7	30.0	7.9	11.3	20.7
Opina/La Vanguardia	22–25 Jan 2000	3,000	37.3	32.3	7.6	22.8	5.0
Vox Pública/El Periódico	11–18 Jan 2000	2,300	53.6	29.9	10.1	6.3	23.7
ASEP	10–15 Jan 2000	1,214	37.7	28.9	14.1	19.4	8.8
Opina/La Vanguardia	19–22 Nov 1999	3,000	37.0	31.2	9.0	22.8	5.8
ASEP	8–12 Nov 1999	1,211	31.2	26.1	19.0	23.7	5.1
ASEP	11–18 Oct 1999	1,213	35.7	26.1	17.6	20.7	9.6
Opina/La Vanguardia	23–24 Jan 1998	1,000	35.4	30.1	10.4	24.1	5.3
Opina/La Vanguardia	4–5 Dec 1997	1,000	33.4	32.0	7.4	27.2	1.4
Opina/La Vanguardia	19–21 Sep 1997	1,000	30.0	31.0	11.4	27.6	1.0

=== Aznar vs. Borrell ===
Polling firm/Commissioner	Fieldwork date	Sample size			Other/ None/ Not care	Question	Lead
Polling firm/Commissioner	Fieldwork date	Sample size	Aznar PP	Borrell PSOE	Other/ None/ Not care	Question	Lead
Opina/La Vanguardia	21–23 Jan 1999	1,000	32.0	33.2	9.9	24.9	1.2
Opina/La Vanguardia	13–14 Nov 1998	1,000	30.8	33.1	9.7	26.4	2.3
Opina/La Vanguardia	13 May 1998	1,000	30.7	38.2	9.1	22.0	7.5
Demoscopia/El País	25 Apr 1998	1,200	30.0	40.0	30.0		10.0

=== Aznar vs. González ===
Polling firm/Commissioner	Fieldwork date	Sample size			Other/ None/ Not care	Question	Lead
Polling firm/Commissioner	Fieldwork date	Sample size	Aznar PP	González PSOE	Other/ None/ Not care	Question	Lead
Opina/La Vanguardia	23–24 Jan 1998	1,000	35.2	33.5	10.3	21.0	1.7
Opina/La Vanguardia	4–5 Dec 1997	1,000	34.2	34.8	7.5	23.5	0.6
Opina/La Vanguardia	19–21 Sep 1997	1,000	30.9	35.3	11.0	22.8	4.4
Opina/La Vanguardia	14–16 Jun 1997	1,000	30.0	31.0	13.2	25.7	1.0
Opina/La Vanguardia	19–20 May 1997	1,000	29.9	28.3	15.0	26.8	1.6
Opina/La Vanguardia	19–20 Apr 1997	1,000	31.1	31.4	13.3	24.2	0.3
Opina/La Vanguardia	7–8 Mar 1997	1,000	32.2	32.8	13.4	23.6	0.6
Opina/La Vanguardia	3–4 Feb 1997	1,000	29.5	32.0	13.6	24.9	2.5
Opina/La Vanguardia	30 Sep–2 Oct 1996	1,066	26.9	34.3	11.7	27.1	7.4

== Predicted prime minister ==
The table below lists opinion polling on the perceived likelihood for each leader to become prime minister.

=== Aznar vs. Almunia ===
Polling firm/Commissioner	Fieldwork date	Sample size			Other/ None/ Not care	Question	Lead
Polling firm/Commissioner	Fieldwork date	Sample size	Aznar PP	Almunia PSOE	Other/ None/ Not care	Question	Lead
Opina/La Vanguardia	24–28 Feb 2000	3,000	60.0	16.7	0.3	23.0	43.3
ASEP	14–19 Feb 2000	1,214	62.7	11.8	2.7	22.8	50.9
Opina/La Vanguardia	22–25 Jan 2000	3,000	64.3	12.1	1.2	22.4	52.2
ASEP	10–15 Jan 2000	1,214	69.3	8.2	3.3	19.2	61.1
Opina/La Vanguardia	19–22 Nov 1999	3,000	64.1	11.8	0.7	23.4	52.3
ASEP	8–12 Nov 1999	1,211	65.8	7.4	2.4	24.4	58.4
ASEP	11–18 Oct 1999	1,213	68.9	10.0	2.8	18.3	58.9
Opina/La Vanguardia	23–24 Jan 1998	1,000	61.5	12.9	2.4	23.2	48.6
Opina/La Vanguardia	4–5 Dec 1997	1,000	56.8	13.9	2.0	27.3	42.9
Opina/La Vanguardia	19–21 Sep 1997	1,000	46.6	19.4	4.3	29.7	27.2

=== Aznar vs. Borrell ===
Polling firm/Commissioner	Fieldwork date	Sample size			Other/ None/ Not care	Question	Lead
Polling firm/Commissioner	Fieldwork date	Sample size	Aznar PP	Borrell PSOE	Other/ None/ Not care	Question	Lead
Opina/La Vanguardia	21–23 Jan 1999	1,000	62.8	12.2	2.1	22.9	50.6
Opina/La Vanguardia	13–14 Nov 1998	1,000	55.9	14.6	2.3	27.2	41.3
Opina/La Vanguardia	13 May 1998	1,000	47.5	25.7	2.7	24.1	21.8

=== Aznar vs. González ===
Polling firm/Commissioner	Fieldwork date	Sample size			Other/ None/ Not care	Question	Lead
Polling firm/Commissioner	Fieldwork date	Sample size	Aznar PP	González PSOE	Other/ None/ Not care	Question	Lead
Opina/La Vanguardia	23–24 Jan 1998	1,000	59.2	19.0	2.4	19.4	40.2
Opina/La Vanguardia	4–5 Dec 1997	1,000	53.6	21.2	2.1	23.1	32.4
Opina/La Vanguardia	19–21 Sep 1997	1,000	45.7	27.9	5.1	21.3	17.8
Opina/La Vanguardia	14–16 Jun 1997	1,000	41.0	25.0	5.6	28.3	16.0
Opina/La Vanguardia	19–20 May 1997	1,000	39.6	27.1	5.4	27.9	12.5
Opina/La Vanguardia	19–20 Apr 1997	1,000	40.5	28.0	4.9	26.7	12.5
Opina/La Vanguardia	7–8 Mar 1997	1,000	38.4	31.8	5.8	24.0	6.6
Opina/La Vanguardia	3–4 Feb 1997	1,000	34.0	33.9	5.7	26.4	0.1
Opina/La Vanguardia	30 Sep–2 Oct 1996	1,066	37.7	27.4	5.1	27.1	10.3

== Leader ratings ==
The table below lists opinion polling on leader ratings, on a 0–10 scale: 0 would stand for a "terrible" rating, whereas 10 would stand for "excellent".

Polling firm/Commissioner	Fieldwork date	Sample size								
Polling firm/Commissioner	Fieldwork date	Sample size	Aznar PP	González PSOE	Almunia PSOE	Borrell PSOE	Anguita IU	Frutos IU	Pujol CiU	Arzalluz PNV
Opina/La Vanguardia	24–28 Feb 2000	3,000	5.4	–	5.1	–	–	4.7	–	–
CIS	11–28 Feb 2000	24,040	5.29	–	4.82	–	–	4.11	3.54	1.99
Opina/La Vanguardia	22–25 Jan 2000	3,000	5.5	5.2	5.0	–	–	4.4	4.4	2.4
Opina/La Vanguardia	19–22 Nov 1999	3,000	5.2	4.9	4.7	–	3.8	4.0	4.4	2.7
Opina/La Vanguardia	21–23 Jan 1999	1,000	5.3	5.3	–	4.9	4.6	4.2	4.1	2.5
Opina/La Vanguardia	13–14 Nov 1998	1,000	5.5	5.1	–	5.1	4.3	–	4.2	2.9
Opina/La Vanguardia	13 May 1998	1,000	5.1	5.2	–	5.3	4.4	–	4.4	3.1
Opina/La Vanguardia	23–24 Jan 1998	1,000	5.4	5.2	5.2	–	4.0	–	4.3	3.5
Opina/La Vanguardia	4–5 Dec 1997	1,000	5.3	5.1	5.3	–	3.9	–	4.2	3.1
Opina/La Vanguardia	19–21 Sep 1997	1,000	5.1	5.4	5.3	–	3.6	–	4.0	3.4
Opina/La Vanguardia	14–16 Jun 1997	1,000	5.2	5.1	–	–	4.2	–	4.2	3.5
Opina/La Vanguardia	19–20 May 1997	1,000	5.2	5.0	–	–	4.1	–	4.0	3.2
Opina/La Vanguardia	19–20 Apr 1997	1,000	5.2	5.2	–	–	4.3	–	4.1	3.2
Opina/La Vanguardia	7–8 Mar 1997	1,000	5.4	5.6	–	–	4.7	–	4.5	3.5
Opina/La Vanguardia	3–4 Feb 1997	1,000	4.9	5.0	–	–	4.2	–	4.3	3.3
Opina/La Vanguardia	30 Sep–2 Oct 1996	1,066	5.1	5.5	–	–	4.0	–	4.1	3.6

== Approval ratings ==
The tables below list the public approval ratings of the leaders and leading candidates of the main political parties in Spain.

=== José María Aznar ===
Polling firm/Commissioner	Fieldwork date	Sample size	José María Aznar (PP)			
Polling firm/Commissioner	Fieldwork date	Sample size	check	X mark	Question	Net
Gallup	2–27 Sep 1999	2,029	35.0	41.0	24.0	−6.0

=== Joaquín Almunia ===
Polling firm/Commissioner	Fieldwork date	Sample size	Joaquín Almunia (PSOE)			
Polling firm/Commissioner	Fieldwork date	Sample size	check	X mark	Question	Net
Gallup	2–27 Sep 1999	2,029	27.0	36.0	37.0	−9.0

=== Felipe González ===
Polling firm/Commissioner	Fieldwork date	Sample size	Felipe González (PSOE)			
Polling firm/Commissioner	Fieldwork date	Sample size	check	X mark	Question	Net
Gallup	2–27 Sep 1999	2,029	39.0	33.0	28.0	+6.0

=== Julio Anguita ===
Polling firm/Commissioner	Fieldwork date	Sample size	Julio Anguita (IU)			
Polling firm/Commissioner	Fieldwork date	Sample size	check	X mark	Question	Net
Gallup	2–27 Sep 1999	2,029	19.0	51.0	30.0	−32.0
