= Leadership opinion polling for the 2008 Spanish general election =

Opinion Polls and General Elections

In the run up to the 2008 Spanish general election, various organisations carried out opinion polling to gauge the opinions that voters hold towards political leaders. Results of such polls are displayed in this article. The date range for these opinion polls is from the previous general election, held on 14 March 2004, to the day the next election was held, on 9 March 2008.

== Preferred prime minister ==
The table below lists opinion polling on leader preferences to become prime minister.

Polling firm/Commissioner	Fieldwork date	Sample size			Other/ None/ Not care	Question	Lead
Polling firm/Commissioner	Fieldwork date	Sample size	Rodríguez Zapatero PSOE	Rajoy PP	Other/ None/ Not care	Question	Lead
Opina/Cadena SER	2 Mar 2008	?	49.0	34.0	17.0		15.0
Opina/Cadena SER	29 Feb 2008	?	49.0	34.0	17.0		15.0
Noxa/La Vanguardia	26–29 Feb 2008	1,200	57.0	37.0	–	6.0	20.0
Opina/Cadena SER	28 Feb 2008	?	48.0	34.0	18.0		14.0
Opina/Cadena SER	26 Feb 2008	?	48.0	34.0	18.0		14.0
Obradoiro de Socioloxía/Público	23–26 Feb 2008	?	49.0	27.5	23.5		21.5
Opina/Cadena SER	25 Feb 2008	?	48.0	34.0	18.0		14.0
Obradoiro de Socioloxía/Público	22–25 Feb 2008	1,796	48.8	27.0	24.2		21.8
Opina/Cadena SER	24 Feb 2008	?	48.0	34.0	18.0		14.0
Obradoiro de Socioloxía/Público	21–23 Feb 2008	?	47.0	27.4	25.6		19.6
Obradoiro de Socioloxía/Público	20–22 Feb 2008	1,812	44.7	27.6	27.7		17.1
Opina/Cadena SER	21 Feb 2008	?	47.0	35.0	18.0		12.0
GESOP/El Periódico	11–17 Feb 2008	1,500	53.3	30.8	15.9		22.5
Noxa/La Vanguardia	8–14 Feb 2008	1,800	54.0	36.0	–	10.0	18.0
Obradoiro de Socioloxía/Público	7 Jan–12 Feb 2008	12,000	46.1	29.0	24.9		17.1
Obradoiro de Socioloxía/Público	28 Jan–8 Feb 2008	4,008	46.0	27.6	20.7	5.7	18.4
CIS	21 Jan–4 Feb 2008	18,221	50.4	26.2	17.5	5.9	24.2
Obradoiro de Socioloxía/Público	21–31 Jan 2008	4,009	46.3	27.1	26.6		19.2
Obradoiro de Socioloxía/Público	14–24 Jan 2008	4,007	47.4	29.0	23.6		18.4
Opina/Cadena SER	23 Jan 2008	1,000	50.7	31.4	10.0	7.9	19.3
Noxa/La Vanguardia	11–16 Jan 2008	1,000	53.0	37.0	–	10.0	16.0
Opina/Cadena SER	9 Jan 2008	1,000	47.4	33.9	8.4	10.3	13.5
Obradoiro de Socioloxía/Público	20 Nov–21 Dec 2007	9,100	47.7	25.7	26.6		22.0
Noxa/La Vanguardia	28 Nov–12 Dec 2007	2,000	54.0	35.0	–	11.0	19.0
Opina/Cadena SER	4 Dec 2007	1,000	50.1	30.8	9.0	10.1	19.3
Opina/Cadena SER	21 Nov 2007	1,000	49.6	30.7	8.4	11.3	18.9
GESOP/El Periódico	12–17 Nov 2007	1,500	53.1	26.8	20.1		26.3
Opina/Cadena SER	6 Nov 2007	1,000	49.6	30.4	10.2	9.8	19.2
Opina/Cadena SER	23 Oct 2007	1,000	50.3	31.2	7.1	11.4	19.1
Opina/Cadena SER	9 Oct 2007	1,000	51.4	30.6	8.9	9.1	20.8
Noxa/La Vanguardia	28 Sep–3 Oct 2007	1,000	51.0	36.0	–	13.0	15.0
Opina/Cadena SER	26 Sep 2007	1,000	48.1	31.6	10.5	9.8	16.5
Opina/Cadena SER	13 Sep 2007	1,000	49.7	32.0	9.4	8.9	17.7
Opina/Cadena SER	29 Aug 2007	1,000	49.9	30.7	10.0	9.4	19.2
GESOP/El Periódico	13–15 Jun 2007	800	51.5	30.0	18.5		21.5
Opina/El País	21–22 Mar 2007	1,000	47.9	31.8	20.3		16.1
GESOP/El Periódico	11–15 Mar 2007	1,500	48.7	31.2	20.1		17.5
Opina/Cadena SER	7 Mar 2007	1,000	47.6	36.4	7.5	8.5	11.2
Opina/Cadena SER	23 Feb 2007	1,000	50.4	30.8	7.5	11.3	19.6
Opina/Cadena SER	7 Feb 2007	?	48.6	32.5	9.6	9.3	16.1
Opina/Cadena SER	17 Jan 2007	?	51.0	31.4	7.5	10.1	19.6
Opina/Cadena SER	4 Jan 2007	1,000	48.0	34.2	6.1	11.7	13.8
Opina/Cadena SER	12 Dec 2006	?	49.5	29.1	7.4	14.0	20.4
Opina/El País	14 Jul 2006	800	46.9	31.5	21.6		15.4
GESOP/El Periódico	30 Jun–4 Jul 2006	1,000	52.0	28.3	19.7		23.7
GESOP/El Periódico	19–22 Apr 2006	1,002	53.6	31.6	14.8		22.0
Opina/Cadena SER	30 Mar 2006	1,000	48.0	31.4	6.9	13.7	16.6
Opina/Cadena SER	23 Mar 2006	?	49.8	30.9	6.6	12.7	18.9
Opina/Cadena SER	15–16 Mar 2006	1,000	46.2	32.9	9.8	11.1	13.3
Opina/Cadena SER	2 Mar 2006	1,000	47.6	33.2	7.6	11.6	14.4
Opina/Cadena SER	16 Feb 2006	1,000	47.1	33.5	8.1	11.3	13.6
Opina/Cadena SER	2 Feb 2006	1,000	46.7	34.5	8.8	10.0	12.2
GESOP/El Periódico	30 Jan–2 Feb 2006	1,000	49.3	31.4	19.3		17.9
Opina/Cadena SER	21 Jan 2006	?	47.6	33.2	7.5	11.7	12.2
Opina/Cadena SER	3 Jan 2006	1,000	46.6	32.8	8.2	12.4	13.8
Opina/Cadena SER	7 Dec 2005	?	45.8	34.8	7.4	12.0	11.0
Opina/Cadena SER	17 Nov 2005	1,000	45.4	35.1	7.8	11.7	10.3
Opina/Cadena SER	3 Nov 2005	1,000	44.3	34.5	7.6	13.6	9.7
Opina/Cadena SER	14 Oct 2005	1,000	48.8	33.9	9.0	8.3	14.9
GESOP/El Periódico	9–11 Oct 2005	1,000	49.9	32.5	17.6		17.4
Opina/Cadena SER	1 Oct 2005	1,000	47.0	31.3	9.0	12.7	15.7
Opina/Cadena SER	15 Sep 2005	1,000	48.0	31.5	9.4	11.1	16.5
Opina/Cadena SER	1 Sep 2005	?	51.7	29.1	6.0	13.2	22.6
Opina/Cadena SER	29 Jun 2005	1,000	51.2	29.1	5.4	14.3	22.1
Opina/Cadena SER	19 May 2005	?	51.9	29.9	5.7	12.5	22.0
Opina/Cadena SER	12 May 2005	1,000	51.8	30.8	5.1	12.3	21.0
Opina/Cadena SER	21 Apr 2005	1,000	49.2	31.5	6.6	12.7	17.7
Opina/Cadena SER	9 Mar 2005	1,000	51.1	30.9	5.6	12.4	20.2
Opina/Cadena SER	23 Feb 2005	1,000	48.1	32.1	5.2	14.6	16.0
Opina/Cadena SER	2 Feb 2005	1,000	49.4	30.5	6.0	14.1	18.9

== Predicted prime minister ==
The table below lists opinion polling on the perceived likelihood for each leader to become prime minister.

Polling firm/Commissioner	Fieldwork date	Sample size			Other/ None/ Not care	Question	Lead
Polling firm/Commissioner	Fieldwork date	Sample size	Rodríguez Zapatero PSOE	Rajoy PP	Other/ None/ Not care	Question	Lead
Opina/Cadena SER	2 Mar 2008	?	67.0	13.0	–	–	54.0
Opina/Cadena SER	1 Mar 2008	3,000	70.0	12.0	–	–	58.0
Opina/Cadena SER	29 Feb 2008	?	66.0	?	–	–	?
Infortécnica	1–29 Feb 2008	1,945	66.5	21.0	12.6	–	45.5
Opina/Cadena SER	28 Feb 2008	?	64.0	14.0	–	–	50.0
Obradoiro de Socioloxía/Público	26–28 Feb 2008	1,810	60.4	10.8	–	–	49.6
Opina/Cadena SER	26 Feb 2008	?	61.0	16.0	–	–	45.0
Obradoiro de Socioloxía/Público	23–26 Feb 2008	?	55.5	11.1	–	–	44.4
Opina/Cadena SER	25 Feb 2008	?	61.0	16.0	–	–	45.0
Obradoiro de Socioloxía/Público	22–25 Feb 2008	1,796	53.9	?	–	–	?
Opina/Cadena SER	24 Feb 2008	?	60.0	15.0	–	–	45.0
Opina/Cadena SER	23 Feb 2008	?	60.0	?	–	–	?
Obradoiro de Socioloxía/Público	20–22 Feb 2008	1,812	54.4	11.7	1.2	32.7	42.7
Opina/Cadena SER	21 Feb 2008	?	60.0	16.0	–	–	44.0
Obradoiro de Socioloxía/Público	18–20 Feb 2008	1,812	51.9	12.8	2.2	33.1	39.1
GESOP/El Periódico	11–17 Feb 2008	1,500	63.3	12.9	–	–	50.4
Obradoiro de Socioloxía/Público	7 Jan–12 Feb 2008	12,000	53.9	16.2	–	–	37.7
Obradoiro de Socioloxía/Público	28 Jan–8 Feb 2008	4,008	55.5	14.9	–	–	40.6
Obradoiro de Socioloxía/Público	21–31 Jan 2008	4,009	53.9	14.8	–	–	39.1
Obradoiro de Socioloxía/Público	14–24 Jan 2008	4,007	53.1	16.2	–	–	36.9
Opina/Cadena SER	23 Jan 2008	1,000	60.6	19.9	0.7	18.8	40.7
Opina/Cadena SER	9 Jan 2008	1,000	57.5	21.6	0.5	20.4	35.9
Obradoiro de Socioloxía/Público	20 Nov–21 Dec 2007	9,100	52.4	16.2	2.3	29.1	36.2
Opina/Cadena SER	4 Dec 2007	1,000	59.3	18.3	0.5	21.9	41.0
Opina/Cadena SER	21 Nov 2007	1,000	58.7	18.6	0.6	22.1	40.1
GESOP/El Periódico	12–17 Nov 2007	1,500	63.5	14.6	–	–	48.9
Opina/Cadena SER	6 Nov 2007	1,000	57.0	21.7	1.5	19.8	35.3
Opina/Cadena SER	23 Oct 2007	1,000	55.0	23.3	1.0	20.7	31.7
Opina/Cadena SER	9 Oct 2007	1,000	55.0	23.5	1.1	20.4	31.5
Noxa/La Vanguardia	28 Sep–3 Oct 2007	1,000	58.0	29.0	–	13.0	29.0
Opina/Cadena SER	26 Sep 2007	1,000	53.2	23.8	1.2	21.8	29.4
Opina/Cadena SER	13 Sep 2007	1,000	55.0	23.2	1.3	20.5	31.8
Opina/Cadena SER	29 Aug 2007	1,000	57.2	22.6	1.2	19.0	34.6
GESOP/El Periódico	13–15 Jun 2007	800	43.8	34.0	–	–	9.8
Opina/El País	21–22 Mar 2007	1,000	51.6	27.9	–	–	23.7
GESOP/El Periódico	11–15 Mar 2007	1,500	48.7	27.0	–	–	21.7
Opina/Cadena SER	7 Mar 2007	1,000	46.0	30.4	2.0	21.6	15.6
Opina/Cadena SER	23 Feb 2007	1,000	53.6	22.0	1.5	22.9	31.6
Opina/Cadena SER	7 Feb 2007	?	51.9	24.6	1.7	21.8	27.3
Opina/Cadena SER	17 Jan 2007	?	52.6	24.0	0.8	22.6	28.6
Opina/Cadena SER	4 Jan 2007	1,000	47.7	28.3	0.9	23.1	19.4
Opina/Cadena SER	12 Dec 2006	?	57.1	19.4	1.2	22.3	37.7
Opina/El País	14 Jul 2006	800	54.0	20.6	–	–	33.4
GESOP/El Periódico	30 Jun–4 Jul 2006	1,000	61.6	19.0	–	–	42.6
GESOP/El Periódico	19–22 Apr 2006	1,002	62.2	18.5	–	–	43.7
Opina/Cadena SER	30 Mar 2006	1,000	55.4	20.8	1.7	22.1	34.6
Opina/Cadena SER	23 Mar 2006	?	56.3	18.4	1.2	24.1	37.9
Opina/Cadena SER	15–16 Mar 2006	1,000	52.5	25.5	1.6	20.4	27.0
Opina/Cadena SER	2 Mar 2006	1,000	50.6	28.3	1.3	19.8	22.3
Opina/Cadena SER	16 Feb 2006	1,000	49.1	29.3	1.5	20.1	19.7
Opina/Cadena SER	2 Feb 2006	1,000	46.3	28.4	0.9	24.4	17.9
GESOP/El Periódico	30 Jan–2 Feb 2006	1,000	48.5	31.3	–	–	17.2
Opina/Cadena SER	21 Jan 2006	?	47.9	30.7	1.3	20.1	17.2
Opina/Cadena SER	3 Jan 2006	1,000	48.4	28.8	1.4	21.4	19.6
Opina/Cadena SER	7 Dec 2005	?	44.8	33.5	1.0	20.7	11.3
Opina/Cadena SER	17 Nov 2005	1,000	44.4	34.1	1.2	20.3	10.3
Opina/Cadena SER	3 Nov 2005	1,000	48.3	30.1	1.7	19.9	18.2
Opina/Cadena SER	14 Oct 2005	1,000	47.7	31.1	2.1	19.1	16.6
Opina/Cadena SER	1 Oct 2005	1,000	59.5	19.2	1.6	19.7	40.3
Opina/Cadena SER	15 Sep 2005	1,000	62.7	17.2	1.8	18.3	45.5
Opina/Cadena SER	1 Sep 2005	?	61.9	18.3	0.3	19.5	43.6
Opina/Cadena SER	29 Jun 2005	1,000	60.2	17.3	0.7	21.8	42.9
Opina/Cadena SER	19 May 2005	?	66.0	15.6	0.3	18.1	50.4
Opina/Cadena SER	12 May 2005	1,000	60.3	18.6	0.6	20.5	41.7
Opina/Cadena SER	21 Apr 2005	1,000	59.5	18.7	1.1	20.7	40.8
Opina/Cadena SER	9 Mar 2005	1,000	61.7	17.9	0.3	20.1	43.8
Opina/Cadena SER	23 Feb 2005	1,000	58.1	21.0	0.8	20.1	37.1
Opina/Cadena SER	2 Feb 2005	1,000	57.4	22.4	1.9	18.3	35.0

== Leader ratings ==
The table below lists opinion polling on leader ratings, on a 0–10 scale: 0 would stand for a "terrible" rating, whereas 10 would stand for "excellent".

Polling firm/Commissioner	Fieldwork date	Sample size			
Polling firm/Commissioner	Fieldwork date	Sample size	Zapatero PSOE	Rajoy PP	Llamazares IU
ASEP	11–17 Feb 2008	1,200	5.0	3.6	3.7
CIS	21 Jan–4 Feb 2008	18,221	5.36	3.95	3.54
ASEP	14–20 Jan 2008	1,201	4.9	3.7	3.6
ASEP	10–16 Dec 2007	1,199	4.8	3.4	3.6
ASEP	12–18 Nov 2007	1,203	5.4	3.4	3.9
CIS	22–29 Oct 2007	2,493	4.92	3.75	4.15
ASEP	15–21 Oct 2007	1,202	4.8	3.5	3.7
ASEP	17–23 Sep 2007	1,213	4.7	3.1	3.8
CIS	6–18 Jul 2007	2,483	5.01	3.81	4.24
ASEP	11–16 Jul 2007	1,200	4.8	3.3	3.8
ASEP	11–16 Jun 2007	1,202	4.7	3.5	3.7
ASEP	14–19 May 2007	1,213	4.9	3.6	3.9
CIS	23–29 Apr 2007	2,455	5.12	4.05	4.38
ASEP	16–21 Apr 2007	1,212	5.0	3.4	3.8
Sigma Dos/El Mundo	30 Mar–2 Apr 2007	800	5.44	4.75	4.01
ASEP	12–17 Mar 2007	1,203	4.9	3.3	3.8
ASEP	12–17 Feb 2007	1,208	4.8	3.7	3.7
CIS	22–31 Jan 2007	2,472	4.93	3.69	4.32
ASEP	15–20 Jan 2007	1,201	4.8	3.4	3.7
ASEP	10–17 Dec 2006	1,191	4.7	3.6	3.7
ASEP	12–16 Nov 2006	1,206	5.0	3.5	3.7
CIS	18–25 Oct 2006	2,481	4.76	3.71	3.78
ASEP	15–22 Oct 2006	1,200	4.7	3.6	3.5
ASEP	17–24 Sep 2006	1,202	4.7	3.7	3.8
CIS	10–16 Jul 2006	2,482	4.94	3.77	4.01
ASEP	3–9 Jul 2006	1,213	5.0	3.4	3.7
ASEP	5–11 Jun 2006	1,205	5.1	3.6	4.0
ASEP	8–14 May 2006	1,201	5.4	3.7	4.1
CIS	24–30 Apr 2006	2,481	5.39	3.97	3.91
ASEP	3–9 Apr 2006	1,206	5.1	3.9	3.7
ASEP	6–12 Mar 2006	1,200	5.1	3.7	3.8
ASEP	6–12 Feb 2006	1,209	4.8	3.8	3.7
CIS	23–29 Jan 2006	2,484	5.01	3.91	4.10
ASEP	9–15 Jan 2006	1,207	4.9	3.9	3.9
ASEP	12–18 Dec 2005	1,207	4.8	3.6	3.6
ASEP	14–20 Nov 2005	1,205	5.2	3.8	3.9
CIS	21–28 Oct 2005	2,489	4.86	4.10	3.82
ASEP	17–23 Oct 2005	1,204	5.1	3.8	3.8
ASEP	19–25 Sep 2005	1,216	5.2	3.7	3.6
CIS	13–21 Jul 2005	2,425	5.48	4.36	3.92
ASEP	4–10 Jul 2005	1,216	5.2	3.9	3.7
ASEP	6–12 Jun 2005	1,222	5.2	3.7	3.7
ASEP	9–15 May 2005	1,200	5.5	4.0	3.7
CIS	27 Apr–4 May 2005	2,477	5.32	4.30	3.73
ASEP	11–17 Apr 2005	1,212	5.2	4.0	3.7
ASEP	14–19 Mar 2005	1,203	5.4	3.8	3.7
ASEP	14–19 Feb 2005	1,203	5.6	4.3	3.8
CIS	19–24 Jan 2005	2,495	5.74	4.55	3.85
ASEP	17–22 Jan 2005	1,212	5.6	4.1	3.7
ASEP	15 Dec 2004	1,212	5.3	3.6	3.8
Sigma Dos/El Mundo	1–2 Dec 2004	1,000	5.81	5.12	3.99
ASEP	15–20 Nov 2004	1,206	5.6	3.8	3.9
CIS	21–26 Oct 2004	2,494	5.82	4.39	3.92
ASEP	15 Oct 2004	1,212	5.4	3.8	3.7
ASEP	15 Sep 2004	1,212	5.6	3.9	4.0
Sigma Dos/El Mundo	25 Jul 2004	1,000	6.25	5.23	4.12
CIS	9–16 Jul 2004	2,487	5.92	4.28	3.82
ASEP	15 Jul 2004	1,212	5.7	3.9	3.8
Opina/Cadena SER	17 Jun 2004	1,000	6.18	5.09	3.92
ASEP	15 Jun 2004	1,212	5.7	4.1	4.0
ASEP	15 May 2004	1,212	6.1	4.1	4.1
Opina/Cadena SER	13 May 2004	1,000	6.49	5.20	4.05
CIS	22–27 Apr 2004	2,493	6.61	4.83	4.31
ASEP	15 Apr 2004	1,212	5.6	4.1	3.8
Opina/El País	30 Mar 2004	1,000	5.94	5.13	4.00
ASEP	15–20 Mar 2004	1,212	5.8	4.2	4.0
Opina/Cadena SER	18 Mar 2004	?	6.17	5.17	3.85

== Approval ratings ==
The tables below list the public approval ratings of the leaders and leading candidates of the main political parties in Spain.

=== José Luis Rodríguez Zapatero ===
Polling firm/Commissioner	Fieldwork date	Sample size	José Luis Rodríguez Zapatero (PSOE)			
Polling firm/Commissioner	Fieldwork date	Sample size	check	X mark	Question	Net
Opina/Cadena SER	2 Mar 2008	?	54.0	?	?	+?
Opina/Cadena SER	29 Feb 2008	?	53.0	?	?	+?
Opina/Cadena SER	28 Feb 2008	?	52.0	?	?	+?
Opina/Cadena SER	27 Feb 2008	9,000	51.0	?	?	+?
Opina/Cadena SER	26 Feb 2008	?	49.5	?	?	+?
Opina/Cadena SER	25 Feb 2008	?	50.3	?	?	+?
Opina/Cadena SER	24 Feb 2008	?	50.0	?	?	+?
Opina/Cadena SER	23 Feb 2008	?	49.0	?	?	+?
Obradoiro de Socioloxía/Público	7 Jan–12 Feb 2008	12,000	52.1	?	?	+?
Obradoiro de Socioloxía/Público	28 Jan–8 Feb 2008	4,008	52.3	36.6	11.3	+15.5
Simple Lógica	23 Jan–4 Feb 2008	2,031	45.5	41.6	12.8	+3.9
Obradoiro de Socioloxía/Público	21–31 Jan 2008	4,009	52.7	35.9	11.4	+16.8
Obradoiro de Socioloxía/Público	14–24 Jan 2008	4,007	53.9	?	?	+?
Opina/Cadena SER	23 Jan 2008	1,000	50.6	42.9	6.5	+7.7
Ipsos–Eco/Expansión	11–13 Jan 2008	?	54.0	43.0	3.0	+11.0
Opina/Cadena SER	9 Jan 2008	1,000	50.2	44.2	5.6	+6.0
Obradoiro de Socioloxía/Público	20 Nov–21 Dec 2007	9,100	52.8	35.4	11.8	+17.4
Ipsos–Eco/Expansión	14–16 Dec 2007	1,000	54.0	41.0	5.0	+13.0
Noxa/La Vanguardia	28 Nov–12 Dec 2007	2,000	59.0	38.0	3.0	+21.0
Opina/Cadena SER	4 Dec 2007	1,000	52.3	40.4	7.3	+11.9
Opina/Cadena SER	21 Nov 2007	1,000	51.5	41.5	7.0	+10.0
Ipsos–Eco/Expansión	9–11 Nov 2007	?	51.0	44.0	5.0	+7.0
Opina/Cadena SER	6 Nov 2007	1,000	51.3	41.0	7.7	+10.3
Opina/Cadena SER	23 Oct 2007	1,000	48.5	43.2	8.3	+5.3
Ipsos–Eco/Expansión	22 Oct 2007	?	52.0	43.0	5.0	+9.0
Opina/Cadena SER	9 Oct 2007	1,000	49.7	42.0	8.3	+7.7
Obradoiro de Socioloxía/Público	21–28 Sep 2007	3,067	48.4	34.2	17.4	+14.2
Opina/Cadena SER	26 Sep 2007	?	49.0	44.0	7.0	+5.0
Opina/Cadena SER	13 Sep 2007	?	50.9	42.8	6.3	+8.1
Ipsos–Eco/Expansión	7–10 Sep 2007	?	47.0	49.0	4.0	−2.0
Opina/Cadena SER	29 Aug 2007	1,000	48.7	44.7	6.6	+4.0
Ipsos–Eco/Expansión	14 Jul 2007	?	54.0	42.0	4.0	+12.0
Noxa/La Vanguardia	6–8 Jul 2007	1,000	47.0	40.0	13.0	+7.0
Ipsos–Eco/Expansión	13–15 Apr 2007	?	52.0	43.0	5.0	+9.0
Ipsos–Eco/Expansión	9–11 Mar 2007	?	47.0	48.0	5.0	−1.0
Opina/Cadena SER	7 Mar 2007	1,000	44.6	47.3	8.1	−2.7
Opina/Cadena SER	23 Feb 2007	1,000	50.4	42.9	6.7	+7.5
Ipsos–Eco/Expansión	9–11 Feb 2007	?	51.0	44.0	5.0	+7.0
Opina/Cadena SER	7 Feb 2007	?	50.7	40.7	8.6	+10.0
Ipsos–Eco/Expansión	5 Feb 2007	?	52.0	45.0	3.0	+7.0
Noxa/La Vanguardia	15–18 Jan 2007	1,000	45.0	43.0	12.0	+2.0
Opina/Cadena SER	17 Jan 2007	?	51.6	41.1	7.3	+10.5
Metra Seis/Colpisa	7–15 Jan 2007	2,000	38.0	49.0	13.0	−11.0
Opina/Cadena SER	4 Jan 2007	1,000	49.7	42.5	7.8	+7.2
Opina/Cadena SER	12 Dec 2006	?	54.4	38.3	7.3	+16.1
Opina/Cadena SER	16 Nov 2006	1,000	49.8	41.3	8.9	+8.5
Opina/Cadena SER	2 Nov 2006	1,000	49.1	43.2	7.7	+5.9
Opina/Cadena SER	28 Sep 2006	?	51.8	40.7	7.5	+11.1
Opina/Cadena SER	13 Sep 2006	?	51.4	41.9	6.7	+9.5
Noxa/La Vanguardia	10–13 Jul 2006	1,000	47.0	44.0	9.0	+3.0
Opina/Cadena SER	20 Apr 2006	1,000	56.0	37.0	7.0	+19.0
Opina/Cadena SER	30 Mar 2006	1,000	57.2	34.8	8.0	+22.4
Opina/Cadena SER	23 Mar 2006	?	58.0	34.9	7.1	+23.1
Opina/Cadena SER	15–16 Mar 2006	1,000	50.3	41.7	8.0	+8.6
Opina/Cadena SER	2 Mar 2006	1,000	51.1	41.4	7.5	+9.7
Opina/Cadena SER	16 Feb 2006	1,000	49.8	43.9	6.3	+5.9
Opina/Cadena SER	2 Feb 2006	1,000	49.9	42.7	7.4	+7.2
Noxa/La Vanguardia	30 Jan–2 Feb 2006	1,000	43.0	48.0	9.0	−5.0
Opina/Cadena SER	21 Jan 2006	?	49.9	43.4	6.7	+6.5
Opina/Cadena SER	3 Jan 2006	1,000	49.0	42.0	9.0	+7.0
Opina/Cadena SER	7 Dec 2005	?	50.5	41.5	8.0	+9.0
Opina/Cadena SER	17 Nov 2005	1,000	47.3	44.6	8.1	+2.7
Noxa/La Vanguardia	7–11 Nov 2005	1,200	41.0	48.0	11.0	−6.0
Opina/Cadena SER	3 Nov 2005	1,000	47.1	43.7	9.2	+3.4
Opina/Cadena SER	14 Oct 2005	1,000	50.7	42.2	7.1	+8.5
Opina/Cadena SER	1 Oct 2005	1,000	50.8	40.3	8.9	+10.5
Opina/Cadena SER	15 Sep 2005	1,000	53.2	37.5	9.3	+15.7
Opina/Cadena SER	1 Sep 2005	?	59.8	32.3	7.9	+27.5
Noxa/La Vanguardia	4–7 Jul 2005	1,000	49.0	39.0	12.0	+10.0
Opina/Cadena SER	29 Jun 2005	1,000	55.4	35.3	9.3	+20.1
Opina/Cadena SER	19 May 2005	?	57.4	33.6	9.0	+23.8
Opina/Cadena SER	12 May 2005	1,000	55.3	35.2	9.5	+20.1
Opina/Cadena SER	21 Apr 2005	1,000	54.9	35.3	9.8	+19.6
Opina/Cadena SER	9 Mar 2005	1,000	58.2	32.3	9.5	+25.9
Opina/Cadena SER	23 Feb 2005	1,000	58.1	31.3	10.6	+26.8
Noxa/La Vanguardia	7–10 Feb 2005	1,000	55.0	31.0	14.0	+24.0
Opina/Cadena SER	2 Feb 2005	1,000	63.0	28.2	8.8	+34.8
Opina/Cadena SER	19 Jan 2005	?	60.2	28.4	11.4	+31.8
Opina/Cadena SER	4 Jan 2005	1,350	56.3	32.1	11.7	+24.2
Opina/Cadena SER	14 Dec 2004	?	56.2	32.7	11.1	+23.5
Opina/Cadena SER	18 Nov 2004	?	57.6	32.0	10.4	+25.6
Opina/Cadena SER	4 Nov 2004	1,000	56.3	32.3	11.4	+24.0
Opina/Cadena SER	21 Oct 2004	1,000	59.1	28.1	12.8	+31.0
Opina/Cadena SER	7 Oct 2004	1,000	58.3	29.2	12.5	+29.1
Gallup	1–21 Sep 2004	2,001	49.0	28.0	23.0	+21.0
Opina/Cadena SER	16 Sep 2004	?	59.5	26.6	13.9	+32.9
Opina/Cadena SER	2 Sep 2004	?	59.0	25.3	15.7	+33.7
Gallup	1–26 Aug 2004	2,019	49.0	28.0	23.0	+21.0
Celeste-Tel/La Razón	12–21 Jul 2004	601	50.9	?	?	+?
Gallup	1–21 Jul 2004	2,019	55.0	26.0	19.0	+29.0
Gallup	2–23 Jun 2004	2,024	52.0	25.0	23.0	+27.0
Opina/Cadena SER	17 Jun 2004	1,000	62.5	24.1	13.4	+38.4
Gallup	3–21 May 2004	2,021	60.0	19.0	21.0	+41.0
Opina/Cadena SER	13 May 2004	1,000	65.5	16.4	18.1	+49.1
Gallup	1–21 Apr 2004	2,019	45.0	29.0	26.0	+16.0
Opina/El País	30 Mar 2004	1,000	58.4	13.4	28.2	+45.0
Gallup	1–23 Mar 2004	1,010	38.0	41.0	21.0	−3.0

=== Mariano Rajoy ===
Polling firm/Commissioner	Fieldwork date	Sample size	Mariano Rajoy (PP)			
Polling firm/Commissioner	Fieldwork date	Sample size	check	X mark	Question	Net
Simple Lógica	23 Jan–4 Feb 2008	2,031	26.7	58.3	14.9	−31.6
Opina/Cadena SER	29 Jun 2005	1,000	35.2	56.5	8.3	−21.3
Opina/Cadena SER	19 May 2005	?	38.3	53.8	7.9	−15.5
Opina/Cadena SER	12 May 2005	1,000	39.7	52.7	7.6	−13.0
Opina/Cadena SER	21 Apr 2005	1,000	40.1	51.0	8.9	−10.9
Opina/Cadena SER	9 Mar 2005	1,000	43.8	46.1	10.1	−2.3
Opina/Cadena SER	23 Feb 2005	1,000	50.8	41.0	8.6	+9.8
Opina/Cadena SER	2 Feb 2005	1,000	55.0	38.2	6.8	+16.8
Opina/Cadena SER	19 Jan 2005	?	49.5	39.3	11.2	+10.2
Opina/Cadena SER	4 Jan 2005	1,350	42.5	46.9	10.6	−4.4
Opina/Cadena SER	14 Dec 2004	?	38.2	50.6	11.2	−12.4
Opina/Cadena SER	18 Nov 2004	?	42.1	45.4	12.5	−3.3
Opina/Cadena SER	4 Nov 2004	1,000	45.1	44.3	10.6	+0.8
Opina/Cadena SER	21 Oct 2004	1,000	46.0	42.3	11.7	+3.7
Opina/Cadena SER	7 Oct 2004	1,000	47.5	39.7	12.8	+7.8
Gallup	1–21 Sep 2004	2,001	21.0	53.0	26.0	−32.0
Opina/Cadena SER	16 Sep 2004	?	43.7	44.2	12.1	−0.5
Opina/Cadena SER	2 Sep 2004	?	44.0	41.8	14.2	+2.2
Gallup	1–26 Aug 2004	2,019	22.0	53.0	25.0	−31.0
Gallup	1–21 Jul 2004	2,019	23.0	56.0	21.0	−33.0
Gallup	2–23 Jun 2004	2,024	26.0	49.0	25.0	−23.0
Opina/Cadena SER	17 Jun 2004	1,000	50.0	37.5	12.5	+12.5
Gallup	3–21 May 2004	2,021	23.0	53.0	24.0	−30.0
Opina/Cadena SER	13 May 2004	1,000	51.4	33.4	15.2	+18.0
Gallup	1–21 Apr 2004	2,019	24.0	52.0	24.0	−28.0
Gallup	1–23 Mar 2004	1,010	26.0	54.0	20.0	−28.0

=== Gaspar Llamazares ===
Polling firm/Commissioner	Fieldwork date	Sample size	Gaspar Llamazares (IU)			
Polling firm/Commissioner	Fieldwork date	Sample size	check	X mark	Question	Net
Simple Lógica	23 Jan–4 Feb 2008	2,031	25.7	46.5	27.7	−20.8
Gallup	1–21 Sep 2004	2,001	12.0	51.0	37.0	−39.0
Gallup	1–26 Aug 2004	2,019	15.0	51.0	34.0	−36.0
Gallup	1–21 Jul 2004	2,019	17.0	51.0	32.0	−34.0
Gallup	2–23 Jun 2004	2,024	17.0	47.0	36.0	−30.0
Gallup	3–21 May 2004	2,021	22.0	43.0	35.0	−21.0
Gallup	1–21 Apr 2004	2,019	18.0	46.0	36.0	−28.0
Gallup	1–23 Mar 2004	1,010	18.0	52.0	30.0	−34.0
