= Leadership opinion polling for the 1993 Spanish general election =

In the run up to the 1993 Spanish general election, various organisations carry out opinion polling to gauge the opinions that voters hold towards political leaders. Results of such polls are displayed in this article. The date range for these opinion polls is from the previous general election, held on 29 October 1989, to the day the next election was held, on 6 June 1993.

== Preferred prime minister ==
The tables below list opinion polling on leader preferences to become prime minister.

=== All candidates ===
Polling firm/Commissioner	Fieldwork date	Sample size					Other/ None/ Not care	Question	Lead
Polling firm/Commissioner	Fieldwork date	Sample size	González PSOE	Aznar PP	Anguita IU	Roca CiU	Other/ None/ Not care	Question	Lead
Opina/La Vanguardia	26–27 May 1993	2,000	34.4	31.1	7.7	6.1	3.7	17.1	3.3
Opina/La Vanguardia	10–12 May 1993	2,000	37.6	25.3	9.5	6.5	4.9	16.2	12.3
Opina/La Vanguardia	19–21 Apr 1993	2,006	26.0	29.9	10.3	7.3	4.2	22.3	3.9
Opina/La Vanguardia	22–24 Mar 1993	2,016	33.0	26.2	–	5.3	12.6	22.9	6.8

=== González vs. Aznar ===
Polling firm/Commissioner	Fieldwork date	Sample size			Other/ None/ Not care	Question	Lead
Polling firm/Commissioner	Fieldwork date	Sample size	González PSOE	Aznar PP	Other/ None/ Not care	Question	Lead
CIS	25–29 May 1993	2,503	46.5	28.8	–	24.8	17.7
Opina/La Vanguardia	26–27 May 1993	2,000	43.8	37.3	4.6	14.3	6.5
Demoscopia/El País	20–26 May 1993	11,000	52.0	24.0	24.0		28.0
Opina/La Vanguardia	10–12 May 1993	2,000	47.8	31.5	4.6	16.1	16.3
Demoscopia/El País	8–10 May 1993	2,500	52.0	23.0	25.0		29.0

== Leader ratings ==
The table below lists opinion polling on leader ratings, on a 0–10 scale: 0 would stand for a "terrible" rating, whereas 10 would stand for "excellent".

Polling firm/Commissioner	Fieldwork date	Sample size					
Polling firm/Commissioner	Fieldwork date	Sample size	González PSOE	Aznar PP	Anguita IU	Suárez CDS	Calvo CDS
Opina/La Vanguardia	26–27 May 1993	2,000	6.1	5.7	5.0	–	–
ASEP	17–22 May 1993	1,222	5.5	4.2	4.6	–	4.6
CIS	14–19 May 1993	2,496	4.91	4.26	4.60	–	3.44
Opina/La Vanguardia	10–12 May 1993	2,000	6.30	5.07	4.76	–	–
Demoscopia/El País	8–10 May 1993	2,500	5.9	4.5	4.4	–	3.6
CIS	23–29 Apr 1993	2,500	4.99	4.42	4.64	–	3.36
ASEP	19–24 Apr 1993	1,218	5.2	4.1	4.7	–	4.4
Opina/La Vanguardia	19–21 Apr 1993	2,006	5.72	5.18	4.67	–	–
Eco Consulting/CIS	15–16 Apr 1993	1,208	5.77	5.22	5.33	–	4.40
Sigma Dos/El Mundo	13–15 Apr 1993	8,200	4.66	4.35	4.43	–	–
CIS	15–26 Mar 1993	2,500	5.36	4.66	5.15	–	3.69
Opina/La Vanguardia	22–24 Mar 1993	2,016	5.54	4.72	4.41	–	–
ASEP	15–20 Mar 1993	1,212	4.9	4.5	4.7	–	4.8
Demoscopia/El País	7–14 Mar 1993	10,000	4.8	3.9	4.1	–	3.0
ASEP	15–20 Feb 1993	1,209	5.0	4.6	4.5	–	4.6
CIS	8–13 Feb 1993	2,502	5.50	4.85	4.67	–	3.84
ASEP	18–23 Jan 1993	1,204	5.0	4.5	4.6	–	4.7
ASEP	9–14 Dec 1992	1,212	5.0	4.4	4.6	–	4.6
CIS	4–28 Nov 1992	27,357	5.11	4.05	–	–	–
ASEP	9–14 Nov 1992	1,220	5.0	4.1	4.4	–	4.4
CIS	28 Oct–2 Nov 1992	2,499	5.17	4.22	4.61	–	3.33
ASEP	13–17 Oct 1992	1,222	5.1	4.0	4.5	–	4.6
ASEP	14–19 Sep 1992	1,220	5.3	4.2	4.6	–	4.6
CIS	8–14 Sep 1992	2,498	5.26	4.69	5.12	–	3.85
ASEP	1–8 Jul 1992	1,216	5.4	4.3	4.6	–	4.2
ASEP	8–13 Jun 1992	1,216	5.6	4.6	4.9	–	4.5
Opina/La Vanguardia	19–20 May 1992	1,000	5.24	4.30	4.54	–	–
ASEP	11–16 May 1992	1,211	5.6	4.6	4.7	–	4.5
CIS	24–29 Apr 1992	2,486	5.28	4.15	4.50	–	3.01
ASEP	6–11 Apr 1992	1,208	5.8	4.7	5.0	–	4.6
ASEP	9–14 Mar 1992	1,211	5.8	4.8	4.8	–	4.7
CIS	25 Feb–3 Mar 1992	2,490	5.81	4.21	4.65	–	3.68
ASEP	10–15 Feb 1992	1,213	5.7	4.6	4.7	–	4.7
ASEP	13–18 Jan 1992	1,206	6.1	4.9	4.9	–	4.8
Demoscopia/El País	30 Dec 1991	?	5.5	?	?	?	–
ASEP	9–14 Dec 1991	1,207	5.7	4.3	4.6	–	4.7
ASEP	11–16 Nov 1991	1,219	5.7	4.4	4.5	–	4.7
CIS	19–24 Oct 1991	2,491	5.72	4.66	4.49	3.91	3.58
ASEP	14–19 Oct 1991	1,215	5.7	4.7	4.6	4.2	4.7
Demoscopia/El País	21–27 Sep 1991	1,200	5.8	?	?	?	–
ASEP	16–20 Sep 1991	1,200	6.0	4.4	4.4	3.9	–
ASEP	10–15 Jun 1991	1,215	6.1	4.4	4.7	3.9	–
Demoscopia/El País	7–14 Jun 1991	1,200	6.2	4.5	?	?	–
CIS	22–28 May 1991	2,497	5.72	4.05	4.33	3.56	–
ASEP	13–18 May 1991	1,203	6.1	3.9	4.5	4.2	–
ASEP	15–20 Apr 1991	1,212	6.1	4.2	4.3	4.2	–
ASEP	18–23 Mar 1991	1,218	6.0	4.1	4.0	4.0	–
ASEP	11–16 Feb 1991	1,208	5.6	4.1	4.0	3.7	–
ASEP	14–18 Jan 1991	1,233	5.7	4.0	4.7	4.0	–
CIS	18–26 Dec 1990	2,495	5.41	4.09	4.47	3.53	–
ASEP	10–15 Dec 1990	1,206	5.6	4.5	4.9	4.1	–
CIS	22–28 Nov 1990	2,492	6.10	4.18	4.94	3.68	–
ASEP	15–20 Nov 1990	1,238	5.7	4.5	4.6	3.7	–
Sigma Dos/El Mundo	26–28 Oct 1990	1,000	5.03	4.51	4.39	3.48	–
CIS	17–24 Oct 1990	2,487	5.58	4.16	4.62	3.61	–
ASEP	15–20 Oct 1990	1,224	5.4	4.2	4.6	3.8	–
CIS	20–27 Jun 1990	2,492	5.85	4.35	4.83	3.84	–
ASEP	17–21 Sep 1990	1,213	5.4	4.2	4.5	3.7	–
CIS	9–19 Jul 1990	2,500	5.94	4.12	4.69	3.40	–
Demoscopia/El País	12–16 Jul 1990	1,200	?	?	4.7	3.6	–
ASEP	2–6 Jul 1990	1,208	6.0	4.4	5.0	4.1	–
CIS	20–27 Jun 1990	2,492	5.85	4.35	4.83	3.84	–
ASEP	11–16 Jun 1990	1,221	5.7	4.8	5.3	4.1	–
CIS	17–21 May 1990	2,492	5.85	4.49	5.09	3.87	–
ASEP	14–19 May 1990	1,219	5.7	4.4	4.9	4.0	–
ASEP	16–20 Apr 1990	1,219	5.7	4.5	4.9	4.0	–
CIS	26–29 Mar 1990	2,484	5.69	4.64	4.96	3.76	–
Demoscopia/El País	22–28 Mar 1990	1,200	?	?	4.7	3.9	–
ASEP	12–17 Mar 1990	1,203	5.7	4.5	5.0	4.2	–
CIS	17–26 Feb 1990	2,495	5.36	4.41	4.78	3.82	–
ASEP	12–17 Feb 1990	1,210	5.8	4.4	5.2	4.3	–
CIS	17–22 Jan 1990	2,923	6.01	4.39	4.84	3.63	–
CIS	17–22 Jan 1990	2,496	5.86	4.61	4.92	3.81	–
ASEP	15–20 Jan 1990	1,210	6.0	4.6	5.2	4.1	–
Demoscopia/El País	11–18 Dec 1989	1,200	?	4.9	4.8	4.2	–
ASEP	29 Nov–7 Dec 1989	1,215	5.9	4.4	5.1	4.0	–
CIS	17–23 Nov 1989	2,463	5.86	4.42	5.08	3.74	–
ASEP	6–11 Nov 1989	1,203	6.0	4.4	5.2	3.8	–
CIS	1–6 Nov 1989	3,084	6.36	4.71	5.22	3.96	–

== Approval ratings ==
The tables below list the public approval ratings of the leaders and leading candidates of the main political parties in Spain.

=== Felipe González ===
Polling firm/Commissioner	Fieldwork date	Sample size	Felipe González (PSOE)			
Polling firm/Commissioner	Fieldwork date	Sample size	check	X mark	Question	Net
CIS	15–26 Mar 1993	2,500	45.8	44.9	9.3	+0.9
CIS	15–21 Dec 1992	2,499	42.0	40.5	17.5	+1.5
CIS	9–17 Oct 1992	2,498	45.0	41.3	13.7	+3.7
CIS	8–14 Sep 1992	2,498	37.9	41.9	20.2	−4.0
CIS	16–22 Jun 1992	2,495	48.5	35.9	15.7	+12.6
CIS	5–21 May 1992	2,500	41.4	37.3	21.3	+4.1
CIS	24–29 Apr 1992	2,486	44.5	38.3	17.2	+6.2
CIS	25 Feb–3 Mar 1992	2,490	54.2	30.1	15.7	+24.1
CIS	20–30 Mar 1991	2,482	52.6	33.2	14.2	+19.4
CIS	7–10 Apr 1990	2,497	47.0	38.0	15.0	+9.0
CIS	14–20 Dec 1989	3,195	52.5	34.1	13.4	+18.4
