= Leadership opinion polling for the 1996 Spanish general election =

In the run up to the 1996 Spanish general election, various organisations carry out opinion polling to gauge the opinions that voters hold towards political leaders. Results of such polls are displayed in this article. The date range for these opinion polls is from the previous general election, held on 6 June 1993, to the day the next election was held, on 3 March 1996.

== Preferred prime minister ==
The table below lists opinion polling on leader preferences to become prime minister.

| Polling firm/Commissioner | Fieldwork date | Sample size | | | Other/ None/ Not care | Question | Lead |
| Polling firm/Commissioner | Fieldwork date | Sample size | González PSOE | Aznar PP | Other/ None/ Not care | Question | Lead |
|---|---|---|---|---|---|---|---|
| CIS | 12–21 Feb 1996 | 6,642 | 43.8 | 33.6 | 1.2 | 21.3 | 10.2 |
| Opina/La Vanguardia | 19–20 Feb 1996 | 2,369 | 31.2 | 34.4 | 34.3 | | 3.2 |
| Opina/La Vanguardia | 5–6 Feb 1996 | 1,185 | 28.6 | 34.0 | 28.4 | | 5.4 |
| CIS | 10–14 Jan 1996 | 2,499 | 36.9 | 32.5 | 10.6 | 20.0 | 4.4 |
| Opina/La Vanguardia | 8–9 Jan 1996 | 1,500 | 32.1 | 31.6 | 36.4 | | 0.5 |
| Demoscopia/El País | 19 Dec 1995 | 2,500 | 36.0 | 27.0 | 10.0 | | 9.0 |
| CIS | 9–14 Dec 1995 | 2,478 | 36.1 | 32.0 | 12.8 | 19.1 | 4.1 |
| CIS | 8–13 Nov 1995 | 2,486 | 35.6 | 29.7 | 11.8 | 22.9 | 5.9 |
| CIS | 13–17 Sep 1995 | 2,493 | 30.4 | 30.2 | 13.9 | 25.4 | 0.2 |
| CIS | 25–30 Jun 1995 | 2,484 | 33.3 | 36.9 | 1.1 | 28.7 | 3.6 |
| CIS | 19–24 Apr 1995 | 2,497 | 29.3 | 34.2 | 21.7 | 14.8 | 4.9 |
| CIS | 19–27 Mar 1995 | 2,496 | 34.2 | 33.6 | 21.5 | 10.8 | 0.6 |
| CIS | 8–9 Mar 1995 | 1,117 | 35.6 | 38.7 | 20.1 | 5.7 | 3.1 |
| CIS | 2–13 Feb 1995 | 2,500 | 40.7 | 27.5 | 24.1 | 7.7 | 13.2 |
| CIS | 9–11 Feb 1995 | 1,200 | 39.3 | 35.8 | 17.0 | 8.0 | 3.5 |
| Opina/La Vanguardia | 10 Feb 1995 | 1,000 | 23.5 | 32.3 | 15.4 | 28.8 | 8.8 |
| Opina/La Vanguardia | 29 Sep–1 Oct 1994 | 2,000 | 26.4 | 24.3 | 11.5 | 38.0 | 2.1 |
| Opina/La Vanguardia | 30 May–1 Jun 1994 | 2,000 | 23.2 | 34.3 | 13.2 | 29.2 | 11.1 |
| Opina/La Vanguardia | 8–11 Apr 1994 | 2,000 | 24.6 | 32.5 | 8.5 | 34.4 | 7.9 |
| Opina/La Vanguardia | 28–29 Sep 1993 | 1,500 | 31.0 | 27.4 | 13.5 | 28.1 | 3.6 |

== Predicted prime minister ==
The table below lists opinion polling on the perceived likelihood for each leader to become prime minister.

| Polling firm/Commissioner | Fieldwork date | Sample size | | | Other/ None/ Not care | Question | Lead |
| Polling firm/Commissioner | Fieldwork date | Sample size | González PSOE | Aznar PP | Other/ None/ Not care | Question | Lead |
|---|---|---|---|---|---|---|---|
| Opina/La Vanguardia | 19–20 Feb 1996 | 2,369 | 12.3 | 63.7 | 24.0 | | 51.4 |
| Opina/La Vanguardia | 5–6 Feb 1996 | 1,185 | 13.7 | 60.6 | 25.4 | | 46.9 |
| Opina/La Vanguardia | 8–9 Jan 1996 | 1,500 | 19.9 | 51.0 | 29.1 | | 31.1 |
| Opina/La Vanguardia | 10 Feb 1995 | 1,000 | 24.0 | 43.9 | 2.0 | 30.1 | 19.9 |
| Opina/La Vanguardia | 29 Sep–1 Oct 1994 | 2,000 | 29.1 | 37.7 | 0.9 | 32.2 | 8.6 |
| Opina/La Vanguardia | 30 May–1 Jun 1994 | 2,000 | 28.0 | 36.5 | 2.6 | 32.8 | 8.5 |
| Opina/La Vanguardia | 8–11 Apr 1994 | 2,000 | 29.8 | 36.2 | 1.2 | 32.8 | 6.4 |
| Opina/La Vanguardia | 28–29 Sep 1993 | 1,500 | 46.8 | 23.6 | 2.1 | 27.5 | 23.2 |

== Leader ratings ==
The table below lists opinion polling on leader ratings, on a 0–10 scale: 0 would stand for a "terrible" rating, whereas 10 would stand for "excellent".

Color key:

Poll conducted after legal ban on opinion polls

| Polling firm/Commissioner | Fieldwork date | Sample size | | | |
| Polling firm/Commissioner | Fieldwork date | Sample size | González PSOE | Aznar PP | Anguita IU |
|---|---|---|---|---|---|
| CIS | 27 Feb–1 Mar 1996 | 2,491 | 5.09 | 4.50 | 4.97 |
| CIS | 12–21 Feb 1996 | 6,642 | 5.00 | 4.53 | 4.96 |
| Opina/La Vanguardia | 19–20 Feb 1996 | 2,369 | 5.7 | 5.7 | 5.5 |
| ASEP | 17 Feb 1996 | 1,215 | 4.9 | 4.3 | 4.6 |
| Demoscopia/El País | 3–7 Feb 1996 | 3,500 | 4.8 | 4.7 | 4.6 |
| Opina/La Vanguardia | 5–6 Feb 1996 | 1,185 | 5.4 | 5.7 | 5.3 |
| ASEP | 15–20 Jan 1996 | 1,216 | 4.5 | 3.9 | 4.3 |
| Opina/La Vanguardia | 8–9 Jan 1996 | 1,500 | 5.7 | 5.8 | 5.3 |
| ASEP | 11–16 Dec 1995 | 1,214 | 4.3 | 4.0 | 4.2 |
| CIS | 9–14 Dec 1995 | 2,478 | 4.77 | 4.19 | 4.88 |
| ASEP | 13–18 Nov 1995 | 1,214 | 4.1 | 3.8 | 4.3 |
| CIS | 17–22 Oct 1995 | 2,493 | 4.15 | 4.14 | 4.89 |
| ASEP | 16–21 Oct 1995 | 1,210 | 4.2 | 3.9 | 4.6 |
| Demoscopia/El País | 30 Sep–2 Oct 1995 | 1,200 | 4.4 | 4.0 | 4.4 |
| ASEP | 18–23 Sep 1995 | 1,217 | 4.1 | 4.1 | 4.5 |
| CIS | 13–17 Sep 1995 | 2,493 | 3.86 | 4.24 | 4.83 |
| Demoscopia/El País | 9 Jul 1995 | ? | 4.3 | 4.4 | 4.4 |
| ASEP | 3–8 Jul 1995 | 1,209 | 4.2 | 4.3 | 4.5 |
| CIS | 8–19 Jun 1995 | 6,510 | 4.70 | 4.78 | 5.39 |
| ASEP | 5–10 Jun 1995 | 1,221 | 4.4 | 4.5 | 4.6 |
| CIS | 25 May–2 Jun 1995 | 2,492 | 4.66 | 4.75 | 5.14 |
| Demoscopia/El País | 10–15 May 1995 | 16,700 | 4.9 | 4.7 | 4.7 |
| ASEP | 8–13 May 1995 | 1,213 | 4.4 | 4.5 | 4.5 |
| Demoscopia/El País | 21 Apr 1995 | ? | 4.5 | 6.7 | 5.6 |
| ASEP | 3–8 Apr 1995 | 1,213 | 3.9 | 3.7 | 4.4 |
| CIS | 19–27 Mar 1995 | 2,496 | 4.05 | 4.36 | 5.15 |
| ASEP | 6–11 Mar 1995 | 1,219 | 3.9 | 4.0 | 4.5 |
| CIS | 8–9 Mar 1995 | 1,117 | 4.36 | 4.48 | 5.36 |
| Demoscopia/El País | 4–7 Mar 1995 | 1,200 | 4.2 | 3.5 | 4.3 |
| CIS | 2–13 Feb 1995 | 2,500 | 5.06 | 4.20 | 5.13 |
| ASEP | 6–11 Feb 1995 | 1,211 | 4.3 | 4.1 | 4.7 |
| CIS | 12–17 Jan 1995 | 2,496 | 4.41 | 4.11 | 4.84 |
| ASEP | 9–14 Jan 1995 | 1,215 | 4.1 | 3.8 | 4.4 |
| Demoscopia/El País | 11–13 Dec 1994 | 1,200 | 4.7 | 3.5 | 4.7 |
| ASEP | 5–10 Dec 1994 | 1,210 | 4.7 | 3.9 | 4.8 |
| CIS | 10–23 Nov 1994 | 2,493 | 4.72 | 4.23 | 5.29 |
| ASEP | 7–12 Nov 1994 | 1,210 | 4.0 | 3.7 | 4.5 |
| ASEP | 10–15 Oct 1994 | 1,212 | 4.4 | 4.0 | 4.7 |
| Demoscopia/El País | 2 Oct 1994 | ? | 4.7 | 3.7 | 4.2 |
| Opina/La Vanguardia | 29 Sep–1 Oct 1994 | 2,000 | 5.3 | 4.6 | 4.9 |
| CIS | 20–26 Sep 1994 | 2,491 | 4.64 | 4.30 | 5.12 |
| ASEP | 12–17 Sep 1994 | 1,212 | 4.3 | 4.1 | 4.7 |
| ASEP | 11–16 Jul 1994 | 1,208 | 4.4 | 4.1 | 5.0 |
| Demoscopia/El País | 3 Jul 1994 | ? | 5.0 | 4.8 | 5.2 |
| CIS | 16–20 Jun 1994 | 2,454 | 4.77 | 4.70 | 5.93 |
| ASEP | 13–18 Jun 1994 | 1,221 | 4.4 | 4.6 | 5.2 |
| Opina/La Vanguardia | 30 May–1 Jun 1994 | 2,000 | 4.7 | 5.0 | 5.3 |
| ASEP | 16–21 May 1994 | 1,223 | 4.2 | 3.7 | 5.0 |
| CIS | 12–16 May 1994 | 2,500 | 4.57 | 4.42 | 5.69 |
| CIS | 18 Apr–2 May 1994 | 2,482 | 4.52 | 4.83 | 5.42 |
| ASEP | 18–22 Apr 1994 | 1,222 | 4.0 | 3.9 | 4.6 |
| Opina/La Vanguardia | 8–11 Apr 1994 | 2,000 | 4.9 | 4.8 | 4.7 |
| CIS | 6–11 Apr 1994 | 2,487 | 4.61 | 4.58 | 5.13 |
| Demoscopia/El País | 27 Mar 1994 | ? | 4.2 | 4.0 | 4.3 |
| ASEP | 14–19 Mar 1994 | 1,216 | 4.3 | 4.5 | 4.6 |
| ASEP | 14–19 Feb 1994 | 1,219 | 4.2 | 4.3 | 4.5 |
| ASEP | 17–21 Jan 1994 | 1,223 | 4.6 | 4.1 | 4.5 |
| Demoscopia/El País | 19 Dec 1993 | ? | 4.6 | 4.1 | 3.9 |
| ASEP | 7–11 Dec 1993 | 1,220 | 4.7 | 4.3 | 4.6 |
| CIS | 26 Nov–1 Dec 1993 | 2,501 | 4.72 | 4.37 | 4.63 |
| ASEP | 8–13 Nov 1993 | 1,217 | 4.7 | 4.2 | 4.7 |
| Demoscopia/El País | 24 Oct 1993 | ? | 4.7 | 3.8 | 4.0 |
| ASEP | 11–16 Oct 1993 | 1,222 | 5.0 | 4.4 | 4.9 |
| Opina/La Vanguardia | 28–29 Sep 1993 | 1,500 | 5.3 | 4.7 | 4.8 |
| CIS | 21–27 Sep 1993 | 2,496 | 5.35 | 4.71 | 5.40 |
| ASEP | 13–18 Sep 1993 | 1,215 | 4.9 | 4.1 | 5.0 |
| Demoscopia/El País | 16–20 Jul 1993 | 1,200 | 5.6 | 4.4 | 4.6 |
| ASEP | 12–17 Jul 1993 | 1,207 | 5.7 | 4.6 | 5.5 |
| CIS | 25 Jun–3 Jul 1993 | 2,500 | 5.73 | 4.61 | 5.29 |
| CIS | 16–23 Jun 1993 | 5,001 | 6.15 | 5.32 | 5.73 |
| ASEP | 14–19 Jun 1993 | 1,219 | 6.0 | 5.0 | 5.8 |

== Approval ratings ==
=== Felipe González ===
| Polling firm/Commissioner | Fieldwork date | Sample size | Felipe González (PSOE) | | | |
| Polling firm/Commissioner | Fieldwork date | Sample size | check | X mark | Question | Net |
|---|---|---|---|---|---|---|
| Inner Line | 16–22 Feb 1996 | 6,048 | 49.8 | 38.2 | 12.0 | +11.6 |
| CIS | 12–21 Feb 1996 | 6,642 | 45.7 | 43.5 | 10.7 | +2.2 |
| CIS | 10–14 Jan 1996 | 2,499 | 39.1 | 49.1 | 11.8 | −10.0 |
| CIS | 9–14 Dec 1995 | 2,478 | 40.0 | 48.6 | 11.4 | −8.6 |
| CIS | 8–13 Nov 1995 | 2,486 | 36.1 | 51.8 | 12.1 | −15.7 |
| CIS | 17–22 Oct 1995 | 2,493 | 31.3 | 53.8 | 14.8 | −22.5 |
| CIS | 13–17 Sep 1995 | 2,493 | 30.0 | 54.8 | 15.2 | −24.8 |
| CIS | 12–17 Jul 1995 | 2,494 | 33.9 | 54.0 | 12.1 | −20.1 |
| CIS | 25–30 Jun 1995 | 2,484 | 32.0 | 55.5 | 12.5 | −23.5 |
| CIS | 25 May–2 Jun 1995 | 2,492 | 37.2 | 49.8 | 13.0 | −12.6 |
| CIS | 19–24 Apr 1995 | 2,497 | 31.1 | 54.4 | 14.5 | −23.3 |
| Gallup/ABC | 3–7 Apr 1995 | 1,000 | 25.0 | 48.0 | 27.0 | −23.0 |
| CIS | 19–27 Mar 1995 | 2,496 | 32.1 | 54.8 | 13.2 | −22.7 |
| CIS | 2–9 Feb 1995 | 2,496 | 36.8 | 49.0 | 14.1 | −12.2 |
| CIS | 12–17 Jan 1995 | 2,496 | 36.2 | 52.9 | 11.0 | −16.7 |
| CIS | 30 Nov–11 Dec 1994 | 2,491 | 39.5 | 48.0 | 12.6 | −8.5 |
| CIS | 10–23 Nov 1994 | 2,493 | 40.5 | 46.4 | 13.2 | −5.9 |
| CIS | 20–26 Sep 1994 | 2,491 | 37.4 | 50.0 | 12.7 | −12.6 |
| CIS | 30 Jun–7 Jul 1994 | 2,492 | 34.4 | 54.5 | 11.0 | −20.1 |
| CIS | 12–16 May 1994 | 2,500 | 32.0 | 56.4 | 11.5 | −24.4 |
| CIS | 6–11 Apr 1994 | 2,487 | 32.6 | 52.8 | 14.7 | −20.2 |
| CIS | 18–30 Mar 1994 | 2,501 | 34.6 | 49.3 | 16.1 | −14.7 |
| Gallup/ABC | 10–30 Mar 1994 | 1,011 | 30.0 | 45.0 | 25.0 | −15.0 |
| CIS | 22 Feb–3 Mar 1994 | 2,499 | 29.7 | 55.1 | 15.2 | −25.4 |
| CIS | 12–18 Jan 1994 | 2,500 | 34.5 | 50.2 | 15.3 | −15.7 |
| CIS | 16–21 Dec 1993 | 2,500 | 35.1 | 52.1 | 12.8 | −17.0 |
| CIS | 26 Nov–1 Dec 1993 | 2,501 | 34.3 | 49.7 | 16.0 | −15.4 |
| CIS | 13–19 Oct 1993 | 2,499 | 40.2 | 46.2 | 13.7 | −6.0 |
| CIS | 21–27 Sep 1993 | 2,496 | 42.1 | 41.5 | 16.3 | +0.6 |
