= Actúa =

Actúa Act
- Founders: Gaspar Llamazares; Baltasar Garzón
- Founded: 3 September 2017
- Dissolved: 2023
- Preceded by: Izquierda Abierta
- Headquarters: C/ Ribera de Curtidores, nº 37, Local 5, Madrid
- Youth wing: Jóvenes que Actúan
- Ideology: Progressivism; Federalism; Republicanism; Secularism; Ecologism
- Political position: Left-wing
- European political alliance: DiEM25; European Spring

Website
- https://convocatoriacivica.es/actua/

Actúa (English: Act) was a Spanish left-wing political party founded by the ex-leader of United Left (IU) Gaspar Llamazares and the former judge Baltasar Garzón.

== History ==
Actúa was registered as a political party in 2017; it is the continuation of a political platform of the same name. Most of its original members were from Open Left, and were unhappy with the current direction of IU and members of the "Civic Coexistence" platform. The main promoters of the initiative are Gaspar Llamazares and Baltasar Garzón. The first manifesto of the organization was signed, among others, by José Antonio Martín Pallín, Federico Mayor Zaragoza, Cristina Almeida, Lina Gálvez, Teresa Aranguren, Carlos Berzosa, Luis García Montero, Almudena Grandes and Antonio Gutiérrez. After Actúa was registered, some of the signers, like Antonio Gutiérrez or Martín Pallín, distanced themselves from the new party.

In 2018, Actúa joined European Spring, the transnational movement led by Yanis Varoufakis. In December 2018, Actúa held his first political conference, in which the party expressed the "firm intention to run in the upcoming European, regional and municipal elections". The party had also expressed its willingness to participate in the candidacies of Más Madrid. In May 2019 it was reported that the party had obtained 11 councillors across the country in the local elections.

The party ceased its political activity by 2023.

== Positions ==
According to Antonio Elorza, the initiative—as it was presented in 2017—had to be understood within the framework of the new movements that emerged in Europe after the decomposition of the traditional social democracy and democratic communism, presenting as main priorities the fight against inequality, the removal of the People's Party from power, ecology and anti-corruption measures.
