= Cayo Lara =

Spanish politician (born 1952)

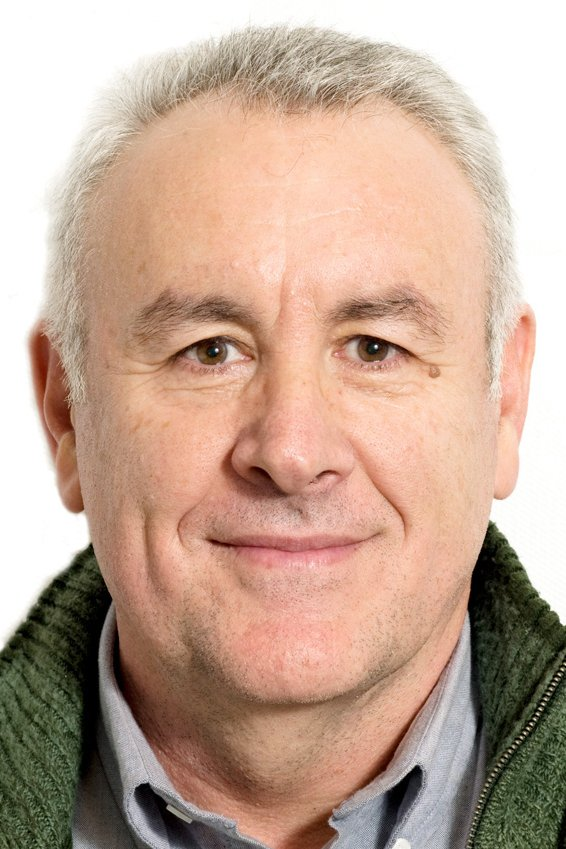

General Coordinator of United Left
- In office 14 December 2008 – 4 July 2016
- Preceded by: Gaspar Llamazares
- Succeeded by: Alberto Garzón

Member of the Congress of Deputies
- In office 20 November 2011 – 13 November 2016
- Constituency: Madrid

Mayor of Argamasilla de Alba
- In office 13 June 1987 – 12 June 1999

Personal details
- Born: 29 January 1952 (age 74) Argamasilla de Alba, Ciudad Real Province, Spain
- Party: Communist Party of Spain United Left
- Children: 2
- Profession: Farmer

Cayo Lara Moya (born 1952) is a Spanish politician. He was the leader of United Left (IU) from December 2008 to July 2016. He is also a member of the leadership of the Communist Party of Spain.

== Early years and regional leadership ==
Born at Argamasilla de Alba in Ciudad Real Province, Lara, the son of a truck driver, has spent most of his life there. At the age of 13, he abandoned his studies to help support his family, having several jobs, until returning from his military service where he established his own farm. By the late 1970s, he was one of the main leaders of the Farmers' Unions in his province and joined the Communist Party of Spain. With the restoration of democracy in Spain, he was elected a member of the executive committee of the Coordination of Farmers Organisations (COAG).

In 1987, Lara was elected Mayor of Argamasilla de Alba, remaining in that position until 1999. In 2000, he was appointed as General Coordinator of IU in Castile-La Mancha. He was a candidate for the Presidency of that community in the 2007 Regional elections, failing to win a seat in the Community's parliament. At that time, he was known for his defence of the Mayor of Seseña in Toledo and Party colleague Manuel Fuentes against building enterpeur Francisco Hernando, el Pocero, for the alleged corruption charges in that municipality.

== National leadership ==
In the wake of IU's poor results in the 2008 Spanish general election, the previous General Coordinator, Gaspar Llamazares, resigned. IU, with its alliance with the Catalan Initiative for Catalonia Greens, had lost three of their five seats in those elections.

Subsequently, three factions emerged prior to the 9th Federal Assembly of IU. One around the leadership and the majority of the membership of the Communist Party of Spain, one formed by the membership closer to the positions of Gaspar Llamazares, and a third one formed by the leaderships of Madrid, Aragon and Catalonia (with the Communist Party of Catalonia being prominent) was called the N-II (after the road that joins these territories). Lara, a member of the first group, and considered a moderate communist by the press, was chosen in October 2008 by the Federal Committee of PCE as the party's candidate to lead the list for the leadership election in the subsequent assembly, along with several other internal allies.

The 9th Assembly, held on 14 and 15 November 2008, ended with five lists contending: that of the PCE and its allies, led by Lara; that of Llamazares' followers, led by Inés Sabanés, IU's spokeswoman in the Madrid Assembly; that of the so-called N-II led by IU's Senator Joan Josep Nuet; one formed around discontented members of PCE's and Sabenés' groups, led by the 25-year-old Haizea Miguela; and one formed by an Andalusian minority and led by the Mayor of Marinaleda and Andalusian MP, Juan Manuel Sánchez Gordillo. The list led by Lara obtained 43% of the votes, the list led by Sabanés 27%, the list led by Nuet 19%, and the lists led by Miguela and Gordillo 6% and 5%, respectively. The outcoming Federal Political Council of IU, unable to elect a candidate with an outright majority, chose Lara as the chair of a committee meant to prepare the next meeting of the council.

The Federal Political Council held on 14 December saw Lara achieve 65% support, and he was thus appointed General Coordinator. Since then, Lara has opted for vocal opposition to the measures taken by the Spanish Government to contrast the effects of the economic crisis.

Preceded by Gaspar Llamazares	General Coordinator of United Left; 2008–present	Incumbent
