= Izquierda Abierta =

Open Left Izquierda Abierta
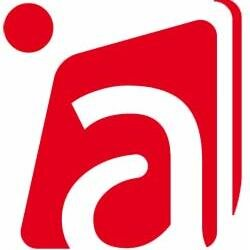
- Spokesperson: Gaspar Llamazares; Montserrat Muñoz
- Founded: 6 February 2012
- Dissolved: 24 December 2018
- Merger of: Izquierda Abierta (tendency); Ezker Batua-Berdeak; Green Network; Convergence for Extremadura
- Succeeded by: Actúa
- Headquarters: C/ Ribera de Curtidores, nº 37, 28005, Madrid
- Ideology: Democratic socialism Republicanism; Federalism; Ecologism
- Political position: Left-wing
- National affiliation: United Left (2012–2018)

Website
- izquierdabierta.es

Izquierda Abierta (English: Open Left, IzAb) is a left-wing political party that was founded in 2012. The party was formed by an internal tendency of United Left of the same name and Ezker Batua – Berdeak. XTenerife, Green Network and Convergence for Extremadura. IzAb was part of the United Left coalition.
