= Francisco Frutos =

Spanish politician (1939–2020)

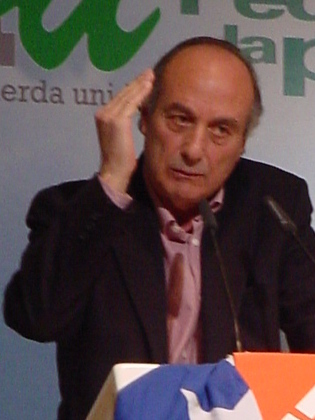
- Frutos in 2005

Secretary General of the Communist Party of Spain
- In office 7 December 1998 – 8 November 2009
- Preceded by: Julio Anguita
- Succeeded by: José Luis Centella

Member of the Congress of Deputies
- In office 29 June 1993 – 2 April 2004
- Constituency: Madrid

Personal details
- Born: 25 January 1939 Calella, Barcelona, Spain
- Died: 26 July 2020 (aged 81) Madrid, Spain
- Party: PSUC; PCE; IU
- Occupation: Politician, farmer, metal worker

Francisco "Paco" Frutos Gras (6 September 1939 – 26 July 2020) was a Spanish politician who served, from 1998 until 2009, as the Secretary-General of the Communist Party of Spain (PCE).

== Biography ==
He was born on 6 September 1939 in Calella, province of Barcelona. A son of peasants, Frutos worked until the age of 25 in agriculture, emigrating later to Germany, and then returning to Barcelona, where he was touched for the first time by trade unionism in a textile factory in Blanes. There, he was an organiser of the then-clandestine Workers' Commissions (CCOO). In 1963, Frutos joined the Unified Socialist Party of Catalonia (PSUC), the fraternal party of PCE in Catalonia. In the 1970s, he was elected organisational secretary of the Workers' Commission of Catalonia, and represented the union in the Assembly of Catalonia. Frutos was also a member of the Confederation Executive Committee of CCOO. In 1980, Frutos was elected a member of the Parliament of Catalonia, and in 1981, General Secretary of PSUC. He would remain in those positions until 1982 and 1984, respectively. During that period, Frutos oversaw different disputes between Leninists and eurocommunists, that led to the expulsion of the Leninist majority, including Chairman Pere Andarica, that would later become the Communists' Party of Catalonia.

After the resignation of Santiago Carrillo as General Secretary of PCE, and the election of Gerardo Iglesias, due to poor results in the 1982 elections, Frutos transferred to Madrid to work within the Structures of the Central Committee of the PCE. After the creation of United Left (IU) in 1986, Frutos was also a member of the Presidium of IU. In the 12th Congress of the PCE in 1988, Frutos was elected Organisational Secretary of the Party. In the 1993 elections, Frutos was elected a deputy for Madrid, and during the 13th Congress of PCE in 1995, Frutos rose to the position of Secretary of the Federal Committee, a position that substituted the position of Deputy General Secretary. In the 1996 elections, Frutos was second on the Madrid List of the IU, and succeeded in being re-elected. In 1998, the then-General Secretary of PCE and General Coordinator of IU, Julio Anguita, suffered a non-fatal heart stroke, and, following that, he announced his intention to gradually abandon active politics. In December of that year, the 14th Congress of PCE was convened, with Frutos elected to the position of General Secretary. In 1999, following Anguita's second stroke, Frutos was asked to be IU's Candidate for Prime Minister in the 2000 elections. Prior to the elections, Frutos signed a polemic agreement with Spanish Socialist Workers' Party (PSOE), then led by Joaquín Almunia. In those elections, IU fell from 21 deputies to 8. Later in the Year, Frutos unsuccessfully disputed IU's General Coordination to Gaspar Llamazares in the 6th Assembly of IU. Remaining as a deputy until 2004, Frutos was re-elected general Secretary of PCE in the 16th and 17th Congresses of PCE.

Frutos was a key-note speaker in the October 2017 Barcelona anti-independence demonstrations during which he denounced the independence movement as identitarian racism. The Communist Party of Spain disavowed him, alleging "he does not represent us, from the Federal Committee we reject his attitude".

In July 2018, he took part in the event that launched Izquierda en Positivo, a political party that vowed to offer a "left-wing and non-nationalist" option.

He died on 26 July 2020.

Preceded by Julio Anguita	General Secretary of the Communist Party of Spain; 1998–2009	Succeeded by José Luis Centella
