= Gaspar Llamazares =

Spanish politician (born 1957)

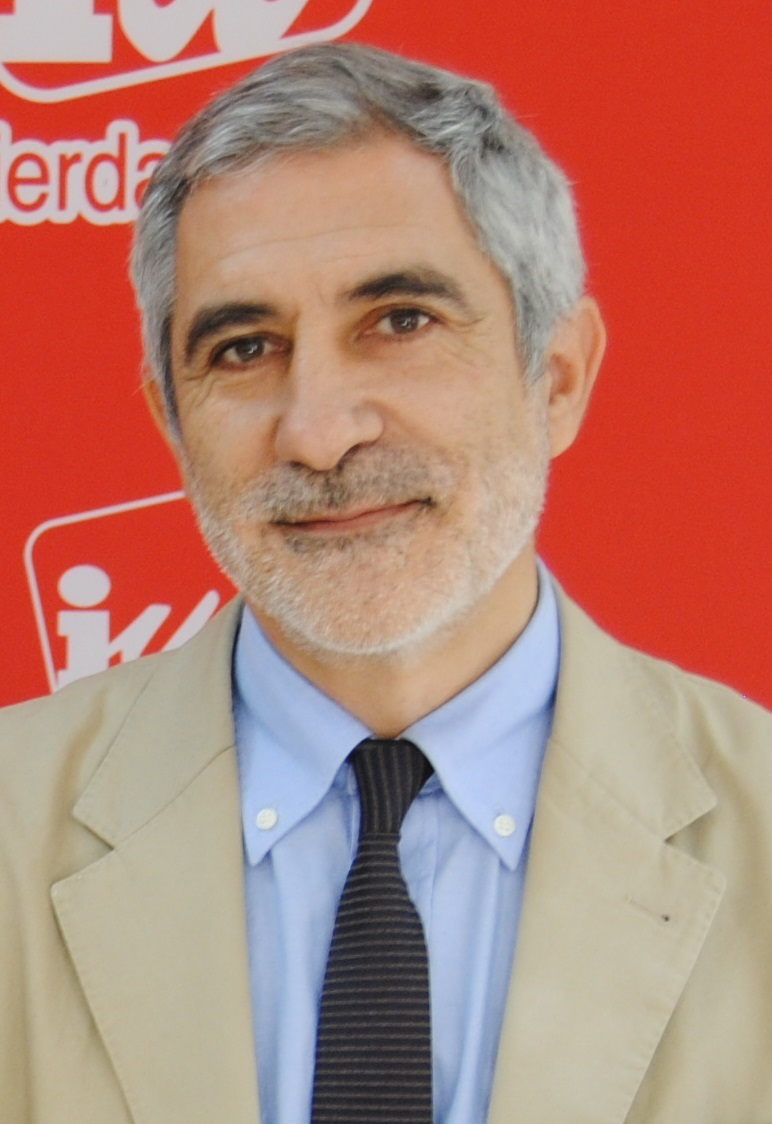

General Coordinator of United Left
- In office December 2000 – October 2008
- Preceded by: Julio Anguita
- Succeeded by: Cayo Lara

Councillor in Oviedo
- Incumbent
- Assumed office 17 June 2023

Member of the Congress of Deputies
- In office 20 November 2011 – 10 June 2015
- Constituency: Asturias
- In office 14 March 2004 – 20 November 2011
- Constituency: Madrid
- In office 12 March 2000 – 14 March 2004
- Constituency: Asturias

Member of the General Junta of the Principality of Asturias
- In office 16 June 2015 – 21 January 2019
- Constituency: Central
- In office 28 May 1991 – 5 April 2000
- Constituency: Central

Personal details
- Born: Gaspar Llamazares Trigo; 28 November 1957 (age 68) Logroño, La Rioja, Spain
- Party: United Left (1986–2019, 2023–present)
- Other political affiliations: Actúa (2017–2023); Izquierda Abierta (2012–2018); Communist Party of Spain (1981–2011)
- Children: 1
- Website: http://www.gasparllamazares.com

Gaspar Llamazares Trigo (Spanish pronunciation: [ɡasˈpaɾ ʎamaˈθaɾes ˈtɾiɣo]; born 28 November 1957) is a Spanish politician. He was the leader of the leftist coalition United Left (IU) from 2001 to 2008, as the General Coordinator.

== Early years and career ==
Llamazares was born in Logroño, La Rioja, Spain. Second of six brothers and sisters, he spent his childhood and youth in Salinas, Castrillón, Asturias. He studied medicine in the Autonomous University of Madrid and in the University of Oviedo, where he received his degree. There, he founded "Bocetos" ("sketches"), a medical publication attempting to focus especially on the social issues of medicine, unlike the biological paradigms then dominating in medicine. He then completed his studies with a Masters in Public Health in the University of Havana, in Cuba. In 1985, back in Spain, he started teaching in the University of Santiago de Compostela, and then in the Unidad Docente de Medicina de Familia in Cazoña (Cantabria).

== Early political career ==
He joined the Communist Party in 1981. In 1988, he was elected Secretary General and General Coordinator of Izquierda Unida in Asturias. In 1991, he was elected deputy to the regional parliament of Asturias, where he was spokesman for Izquierda Unida's group. In this chamber, IU worked with governments of the Spanish Socialist Workers' Party until 1995.

Llamazares was the General Secretary of the PCE in the autonomous community of Asturias, and member of Asturias' Parliament between 1988 and 2000.

== Later political career ==
Llamazares was elected deputy in the Spanish Congress for the constituency of Asturias in the 2000 General Elections. Following the poor results obtained by IU in that elections (20 deputies in 1996, and 8 in 2000), Llamazares announced his intentions to run for the post of General Coordinator in the Coalition's sixth Federal Assembly due to be held December that year. During the Assembly, the post was contested by Francisco Frutos, Secretary General of the Communist Party of Spain, and Angeles Maestro, who was supported by the most radical factions of IU, along with Llamazares, who was supported by the then General Coordinator Julio Anguita. In the Election for the Political Committee, the list backing Llamazares obtained 32 seats, whilst the list backing Frutos obtained 30 seats, and the list backing Maestro obtained 13 seats. In the following General Coordinator election, Maestro's supporters abstained, allowing Llamazares to be elected as General Coordinator. Being the General Coordinator, Llamazares was also designated as IU's parliamentary leader.

Llamazares was re-elected General Coordinator in the seventh Federal Assembly of IU held in December 2003, being opposed by Luis Carlos Rejon, then Deputy for Cordoba, who was backed by several regional minorities, along with the new leftist faction "Espacio Alternativo", and Juan Manuel Sanchez Gordillo Mayor of Marinaleda, Seville, who was supported by the more radical factions of IU (mainly Corriente Roja and CUT). Llamazares obtained a clear majority and was appointed Prime Ministerial candidate.

In the 2004 general election, Llamazares was elected Deputy for Madrid (as it is tradition for the Prime Ministerial Candidates of the national parties to be candidates for Madrid), but IU obtained its worst result ever with only three seats in Congress (five in coalition with Initiative for Catalonia Greens). This led to a large number of IU members blaming the results on Llamazares. In the 2004 European Parliament election, IU won only one Member of the European Parliament from the previous four in 1999 (IU was in a joint list with Initiative For Catalonia that won two MEPs - one for each - that joined separate groups in the European Parliament). That led to Llamazares to call for an Extraordinary Assembly.

In the eighth (Extraordinary) Assembly of IU, Llamazares, who was backed by the more centrist Factions of IU as well as the Green-left factions and the more nationalist leaning factions, was opposed by Enrique Santiago, a human rights lawyer initially supported by the young cadres, and later Communist Party of Spain leadership, and Sebastian Martin Recio, Mayor of Carmona, supported by the Andalusian minority as well as "Espacio Alternativo". (Previously, Santiago and Martin Recio reached an agreement to vote in the most supported of both in the political council. Llamazares won 54 seats, while Santiago won 42, and Martin Recio 14. The sum of Santiago and Martin Recio lists gave the first 56 votes. But a last-hour amendment introduced during the assembly to the IU by-laws, giving the General Coordinators of the Federations the right to vote for the General Coordinator, threw a result of 67 for Llamazares, 51 against, and 8 abstentions, allowing Llamzares to be re-elected as Coordinator General.

In May 2007, prior to the Municipal Elections, Llamazares Became the first national political leader to campaign through Second Life. During the electoral campaign, Llamazares announced he will not re-run as candidate for General Coordinator of IU in the following Assembly, supposedly scheduled for autumn that year. In July 2007, Llamazares announced he will intend to run once more as candidate for prime minister, a decision that caused several controversies inside the organization, specially amongst the Communist Party of Spain, and other sectors considered to be on the left of IU, along with that it was announced that the upcoming general assembly will be postponed to after the General Election, scheduled for March 2008. On October, Marga Sanz, a member of the Communist Party of Spain's Standing Committee and its General Secretary in the Valencian Community, announced her intention to run against Llamazares for IU's nomination to prime ministership. Primary elections were held in the last weeks of October and the beginning of November 2007, with Llamazares victorious.

In March 2008, in the immediate aftermath of IU's worst-ever General Election results, Llamazares announced his intention not to seek re-election to the leadership of IU, finally resigning on 25 October 2008, three weeks before the 9th Federal Assembly of IU that will elect his successor.

In 2009, he sought to publicly condemn Pope Benedict XVI for having argued that condoms may in fact do more harm than good in the fight against AIDS.

On 15 January 2010, the Federal Bureau of Investigation published digitally-aged pictures of Osama bin Laden and Atiyah Abd Al-Rahman on its website which they claimed were produced using cutting-edge technology. Spanish newspaper El Mundo revealed that a picture of Llamazares was taken from Google Images, and his hair and facial stubble was used to create the image. The FBI has admitted to this, and removed the image. An internal investigation has been launched by the FBI to find out if this was done intentionally.

== See also ==
- Politics of Spain
- United Left (Spain)

Preceded by Julio Anguita	General Coordinator of United Left; 2000–2008	Succeeded by Cayo Lara
