= Gerardo Iglesias =

Spanish Communist politician and miner

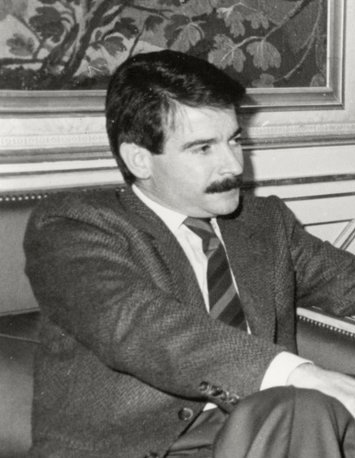

Secretary-General of the Communist Party of Spain
- In office 10 December 1982 – 21 February 1988
- Preceded by: Santiago Carrillo
- Succeeded by: Julio Anguita

Member of the Congress of Deputies
- In office 1986–1989
- Constituency: Madrid

Personal details
- Born: 29 June 1945 (age 80) El Cerezal, Mieres, Spain
- Party: PCE (1950s–1988); IU
- Occupation: Miner, politician, trade unionist

Gerardo Iglesias Argüelles (born 29 June 1945) is a Spanish retired politician and miner. He was the secretary-general of the Communist Party of Spain (PCE) from 1982 to 1988.

== Biography ==
Born on 29 June 1945 in El Cerezal, in the Asturian municipality of Mieres, to a family of miners, he began to work as builder at age 12, and at the coal mines at age 15, when he was already a member of the clandestine Communist Party of Spain (PCE).

During the Francoist dictatorship Iglesias spent much of his youth in prison for his political activities in opposition to the regime and joined the PCE's Central Committee. He later became during the Spanish transition to democracy the leader of the Comisiones Obreras's regional Asturias branch and the PCE's Asturian organization. In 1982 he replaced Santiago Carrillo at the helm of the PCE, and following the June 1986 general election, he was elected member of the 3rd Congress of Deputies in representation of Madrid, running as candidate of the newly created United Left (IU) coalition in which the PCE had subsumed. He resigned to the leadership of the PCE in March 1988, leaving the party in November 1988 over discrepancies with the new Secretary-General, Julio Anguita. He briefly served as the first coordinator of IU (progressively becoming a full-fledged federation) before also giving the reins to Anguita and returning to the mine in 1989.

He suffered a work accident at the mine shafts, and as he had not recovered from a surgical operation of spinal disc herniation, he asked in 1990 for the accreditation of permanent incapacity benefits, which were granted in 1992.

Party political offices
Preceded by Santiago Carrillo	Secretary-General of the Communist Party of Spain; 1982–1988	Succeeded by Julio Anguita
Preceded by Post created	Coordinator-General of the United Left; 1986–1989	Succeeded by Julio Anguita
