= United Left (Spain) =

Spanish political party

United Left Izquierda Unida
- General Coordinator: Antonio Maíllo
- Founded: April 1986 (as coalition); 2 November 1992 (as party federation)
- Youth wing: Área de Juventud de Izquierda Unida
- LGBT wing: ALEAS
- Membership (2023): ▼18,000
- Ideology: Communism; Socialism; Republicanism
- Political position: Left-wing to far-left
- National affiliation: Sumar (since 2023); Broad Front (since 2026); Senate of Progress (since 2026) (Note: In the Senate) (Note: The party was formerly part of The Left (2009–2014), Plural Left (2011–2015), Plural Left (2014–2019), Popular Unity (2015–2016) and Unidas Podemos (2016–2023))
- European affiliation: Party of the European Left
- International affiliation: IMCWP
- Colours: Red
- Congress of Deputies: 5 / 350
- Spanish Senate: 0 / 266
- European Parliament: 0 / 61
- Regional Parliaments: 10 / 1,268
- Local Government: 1,678 / 67,515

Website
- izquierda-unida.es

United Left (Spanish: Izquierda Unida [iθˈkjeɾðawˈniða], IU) is a federative political movement in Spain that was first organized as a coalition in 1986, bringing together several left-wing political organizations, grouped primarily around the Communist Party of Spain.

IU was founded as an electoral coalition of seven parties, but the Communist Party of Spain (PCE) is the only remaining integrated member of the IU at the national level. Despite that, IU brings together other regional parties, political organizations, and independents. It currently takes the form of a permanent federation of parties.

IU took part in the Unidas Podemos coalition and the corresponding parliamentary group in the Congreso de los Diputados between 2016 and 2023. Since January 2020, it participated for the first time in a national coalition government, with one minister. For the 2023 general election, IU took part in the Sumar platform.

== History ==
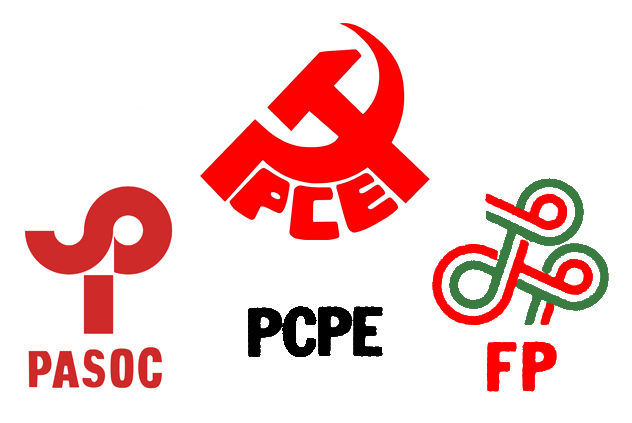
United Left ballot logo from 1986. It was composed of the logos of the parties that signed the coalition. The coalition was represented elsewhere with text reading 'IZQUIERDA UNIDA' until 1988.

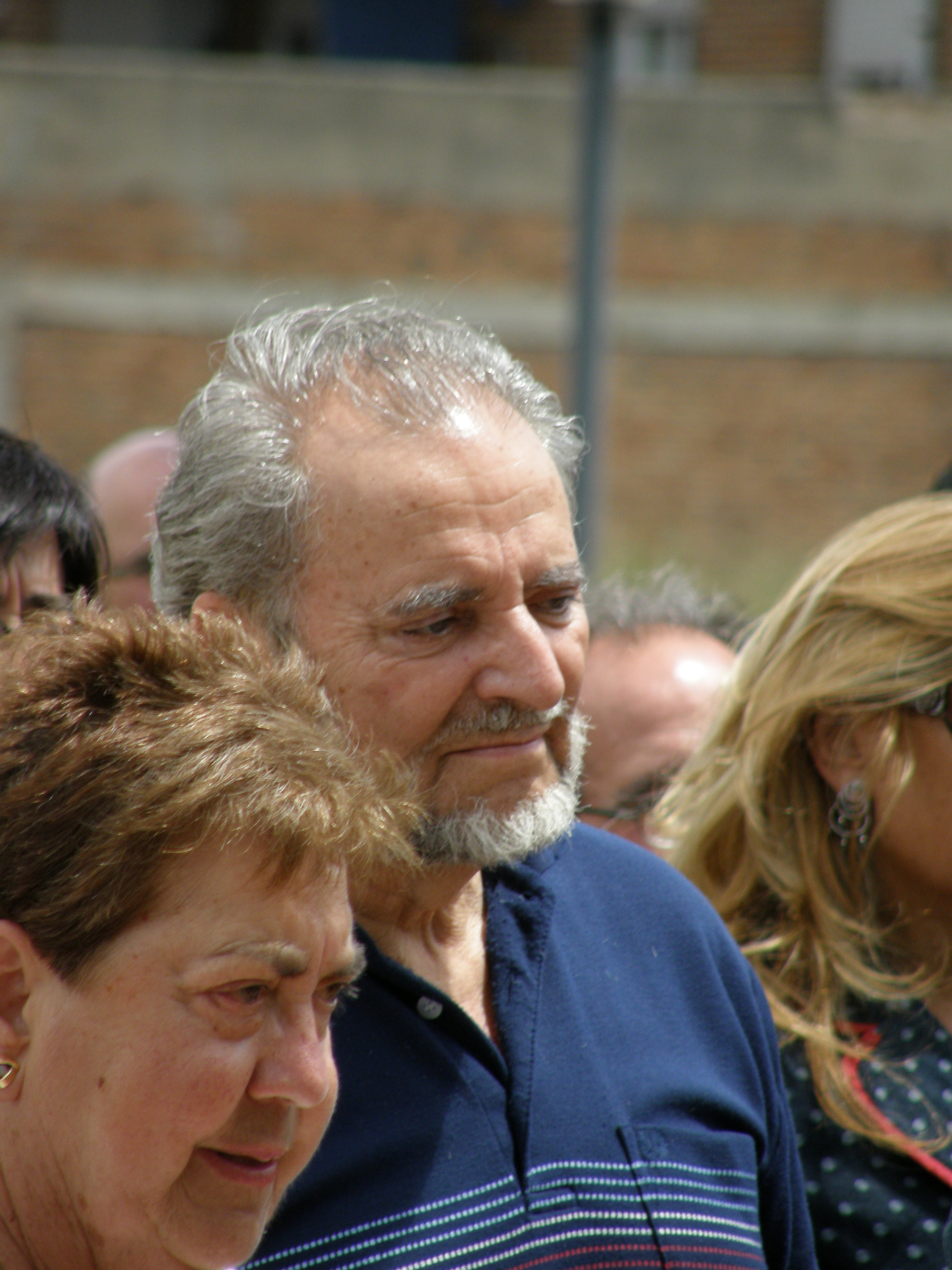
Julio Anguita, general coordinator of United Left from 1989 to 1999.

Following the electoral failure of the PCE in the 1982 general election (going from 10% to 4% of the votes), PCE leaders believed that the PCE alone could no longer effectively challenge the electoral hegemony of the Spanish Socialist Workers' Party (PSOE) on the left. With this premise, the PCE began developing closer relations with other left-wing groups, with the vision of forming a broad left coalition. The impetus for a new left coalition came with the 1986 Spanish NATO membership referendum, where the PCE led the no campaign against the PSOE government, who wanted to stay in NATO. Ultimately, the public voted to remain in NATO, but framework was laid for a new left-wing alliance in the upcoming general election.

The founding organizations were:

- the Communist Party of Spain
- the Unified Socialist Party of Catalonia, the Catalan referent of the PCE
- the Progressive Federation, a moderate split from the PCE
- the Communist Party of the Peoples of Spain (PCPE), a Marxist-Leninist split from the PCE
- PASOC, a left-wing split from PSOE
- the Christian socialist Carlist Party
- the Humanist Party
- the Andalusian Unitarian Candidacy of Workers
- the Republican Left.

The PCE's strategy since the democratisation of Spain was a moderate strategy of Eurocommunist ideals, thanks to its leader, Santiago Carrillo. However, he was ousted as leader after the disastrous 1982 election, and in 1985 and his followers were expelled from the party. He formed the Communists' Unity Board (MUC). This new party outright refused to join IU, and Carrillo claimed the alliance would 'destroy' the PCE.

In the 1986 election, IU won 4.6% of the votes and 7 seats. 4 seats went to PCE members, and 1 each to PSUC, the Progressive Federation and the PCPE. The following year, Spain elected its first members of the European Parliament. IU won 5.3% of votes and 3 of 60 seats.

The Humanists left shortly after the election. The Carlists and the Progressive Federation followed in 1987. The Progressive leader, Ramón Tamames actually defected to the CDS party. The PCPE left in 1988.

Julio Anguita, the former mayor of Cordoba, became the PCE leader in 1988 and IU leader in 1989. The party won 9.1% of the vote in that year's general election, and 17 deputies, and 6.1% of the votes in the European election and 4 deputies. Under Anguita, a more radical strategy and ideology of confrontation against the PSOE because evident. IU generally opposed cooperating with the PSOE, and identified it as a "right-wing party", no different from the People's Party (PP). Since IU's birth, it was accused of launching a 'pincer movement' against PSOE with the PP.

In 1992, IU became a full-fledged party, with the PCE delegating much of its organising to the new party. In the 1993 election, the party gained 0.5% more of the vote and 1 extra deputy. In the 1994 European election, it achieved its greatest nationwide success, at 13.4% of votes and 9 deputies. In the 1996 general election, IU won 10.5% of votes and 21 deputies.

Crisis struck IU due to Anguita's stubborn leadership style. In 1997, the Democratic Party of the New Left was born out of the moderate wing of IU. In Galicia, the local IU federation split when they were not allowed to run joint lists with PSOE; this faction formed the Left of Galicia. The Initiative for Catalonia Greens parted ways in the IU in order to also run joint lists with the Socialists.

After achieving poor results in the 1999 local and European elections, IU decided to adopt a more conciliatory attitude towards the PSOE, and agreed to sign an electoral pact with the PSOE for the upcoming general election in 2000. They also adopted a universal policy in favor of cooperating with the PSOE at the local level.

IU currently has around 18,000 members, a decrease from 70,000 in 2012.

== Organization ==
=== Composition and members ===
Party	Notes
Communist Party of Spain (PCE)	
La Aurora Marxist Organization (La Aurora (OM))	Not a political party. Joined in 1998
Republican Left (IR)	Left in 2002, rejoined in 2011
Unitarian Candidacy of Workers (CUT)	Left in 2015, rejoined in 2018
Former members
Feminist Party of Spain (PFE)	Joined in October 2015, expelled in February 2020 due to its stances on transgender rights.
Humanist Party (PH)	April–July 1986
Carlist Party (PC)	Expelled in 1987
Progressive Federation (FP)	Left in December 1987, due to being dissolved.
Communist Party of the Peoples of Spain (PCPE)	Left in 1988
Socialist Action Party (PASOC)	Dissolved in 2001.
Red Current (CR)	Joined in 2002, left in 2004
Anti-capitalists (IA)	Joined in 1995, left in 2008
Coalition for Melilla (CpM)	Joined in 2008, left in 2013
Open Left (IzAb)	Joined in 2012, dissolved in 2018.

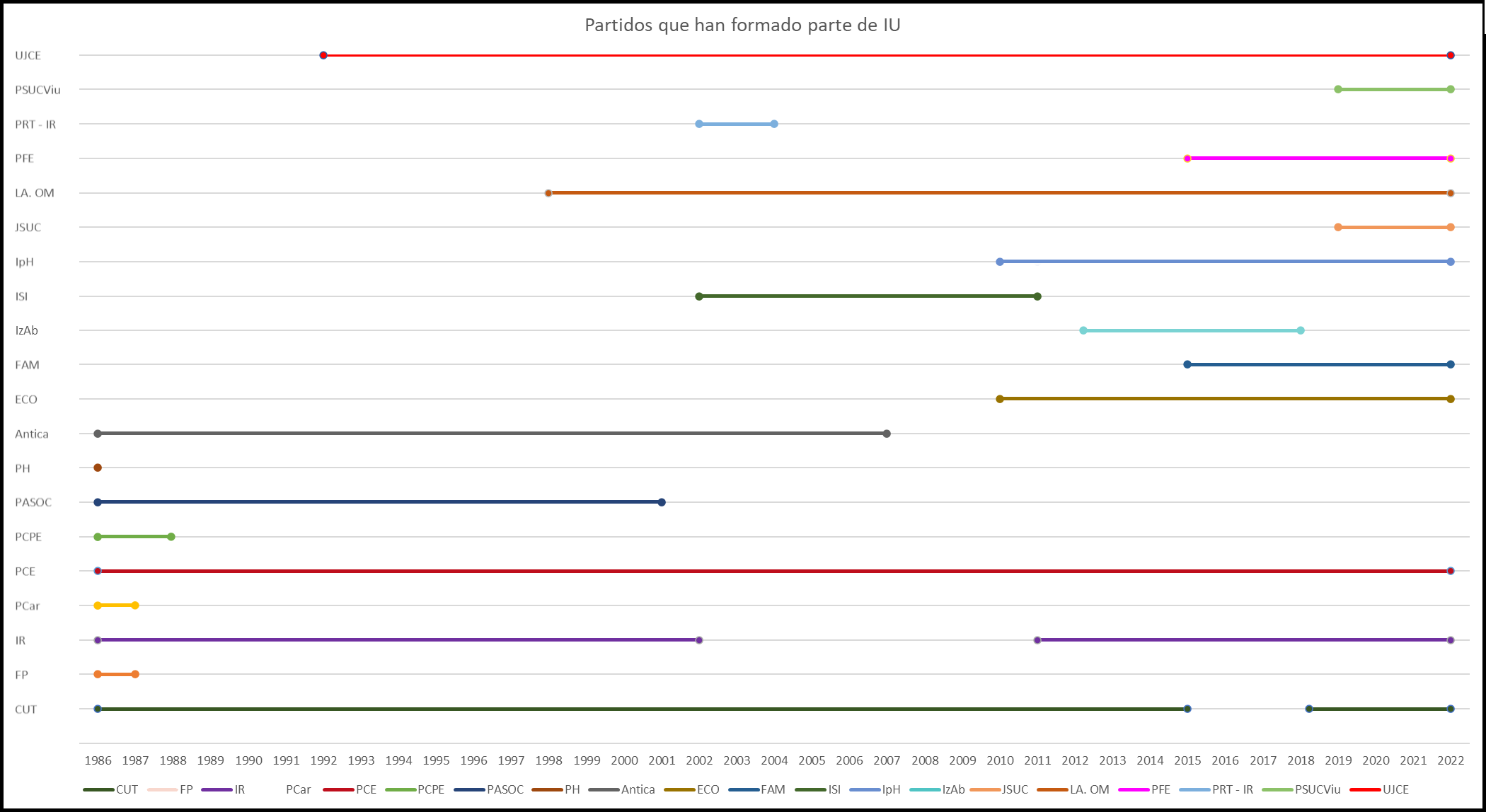
Timeline showing the parties and/or organizations that have formed or have been part of United Left from 1986 to 2022.

=== Communist Party of Spain (PCE) ===
In 1986, the PCE promoted United Left (IU) and participated with other political forces in its foundation, first constituted as an electoral coalition and later as a federation of parties. At the 13th Congress of the PCE it was decided to transfer its sovereignty to the bodies of IU, with its secretary-general Gerardo Iglesias also becoming the first general coordinator of the new coalition.

Under the leadership of the then secretary-general of the PCE, Julio Anguita, IU achieved the best results in its history, but health problems forced him to step down from the leadership. In 2008, the PCE regained leadership of the coalition with the election of Cayo Lara as general coordinator, with the objective of the Refoundation of the Left.

=== Republican Left ===
It was part of United Left (IU) from its creation in 1986, participating actively in the coalition until 2002, when it broke away due to disagreements with the leadership of Gaspar Llamazares.

On 19 June 2010, part of its membership decided to participate in the process of Refoundation of the Left promoted by the new leadership of Cayo Lara, and on 6 February 2011, the party's return to United Left and the participation of its members in the coalition lists was confirmed, although the sector opposed to this integration split off to create Republican Alternative.

=== Communist Youth Union of Spain (UJCE) ===
At the 3rd IU Assembly in March 1992, the Communist Youth Union of Spain (UJCE), the youth organization of the PCE, was recognized as a political organization affiliated with IU, independent from the PCE. At that assembly it opposed the idea of constituting IU as a conventional political party, defending the theses of the PCE leadership, headed by Julio Anguita, of moving from the phase of coalition to that of a political and social movement.

At the 9th Federal Assembly of IU they supported the list headed by Cayo Lara, which won a majority, and he was elected coordinator. In this way the process of Refoundation of the Left began and four UJCE members became part of IU's federal political council.

=== La Aurora (OM) ===
La Aurora (OM) was founded in 1974 as the Revolutionary Workers' Party of Spain (PORE) and joined United Left in 1998. In 2005 it created the Redes current within IU. Its section in Catalonia, the most active, is integrated into EUiA through the Bastida current, while in the Basque Country it was integrated into Ezker Batua-Berdeak through Sarea/Redes (although part of the POR left the coalition in 2011 to call for a vote for Amaiur through the Erabaki collective). In 2013 it changed its name to that of its publication, La Aurora.

=== Ecosocialists of the Region of Murcia ===
On 15 November 2010, the Regional Political Council of IU in Murcia unanimously approved the incorporation of a new political organization, Ecosocialists of the Region of Murcia, made up of people outside the left-wing coalition and independent members of it, and established with the objective, according to its statutes, of working in coordination with United Left to "transform society on the basis of the principles of social ecology, participatory democracy, and socialism".

=== Initiative for El Hierro ===
On 23 December 2010, United Left met in El Hierro with representatives of the leadership of Initiative for El Hierro, where the political agreement reached by both political formations was finalized. The agreement, ratified by the general assembly of Initiative for El Hierro, meant the recognition of this political force as the sole reference of United Left in El Hierro, maintaining its own political identity and decision-making capacity. Both sides maintain that the agreement reached aims to go beyond a simple electoral alliance and enable the process of reorganization of the entire transformative and alternative Canarian left.

=== Broad Front of Madrid ===
Broad Front was constituted in 2013 as an internal current of IUCM, but in 2015 they announced their constitution as a political party within IU. After the defederation of IUCM, Broad Front of Madrid joined as a constituent party of the new Madrid federation of IU.

=== Federal coordinators ===
Name	Period
Gerardo Iglesias	1986–1989
Julio Anguita	1989–1999
Francisco Frutos	1999–2001
Gaspar Llamazares	2001–2008
Cayo Lara	2008–2016
Alberto Garzón	2016–2023
Antonio Maíllo	2024–present

Composition of IU united left

=== Territorial federations ===
- Andalusia: Izquierda Unida Los Verdes - Convocatoría por Andalucía (United Left/The Greens - Assembly for Andalusia)
- Aragon: Izquierda Unida Aragón (United Left of Aragon)
- Asturias: Izquierda Xunida de Asturies (United Left of Asturias)
- Balearic Islands: Esquerra Unida de les Illes Balears (United Left of the Balearic Islands)
- Canary Islands: Izquierda Unida Canaria (Canarian United Left)
- Cantabria: Izquierda Unida de Cantabria (Cantabrian United Left)
- Castilla-La Mancha: Izquierda Unida de Castilla-La Mancha (United Left of Castilla-La Mancha)
- Catalonia: Esquerra Unida Catalunya (United Left Catalonia, Founded in July 2019; suspended in June 2019 Esquerra Unida i Alternativa)
- Castilla y León: Izquierda Unida de Castilla y León (United Left of Castile and León)
- Ceuta: Izquierda Unida de Ceuta (United Left of Ceuta)
- Euskadi: Izquierda Unida - Los Verdes: Ezker Anitza (United Left - The Greens: Plural Left)
- Extremadura: Izquierda Unida Extremadura (United Left Extremadura)
- Galicia: Esquerda Unida (United Left of Galicia)
- La Rioja: Izquierda Unida La Rioja (United Left-La Rioja)
- Madrid: Izquierda Unida-Madrid (United Left-Madrid). Izquierda Unida de la Comunidad de Madrid (United Left of the Community of Madrid) was expelled in 2015. The new federation, IU-M, was created in 2016.
- Melilla: Izquierda Unida - Federación de Melilla (United Left - Melilla Federation)
- Murcia: Izquierda Unida-Verdes de la Región de Murcia (United Left - Greens of the Region of Murcia)
- Navarra: Izquierda Unida de Navarra - Nafarroako Ezker Batua (United Left of Navarra)
- Valencian Community: Esquerra Unida del País Valencià (United Left of the Valencian Country)

== Electoral performance ==
=== Cortes Generales ===
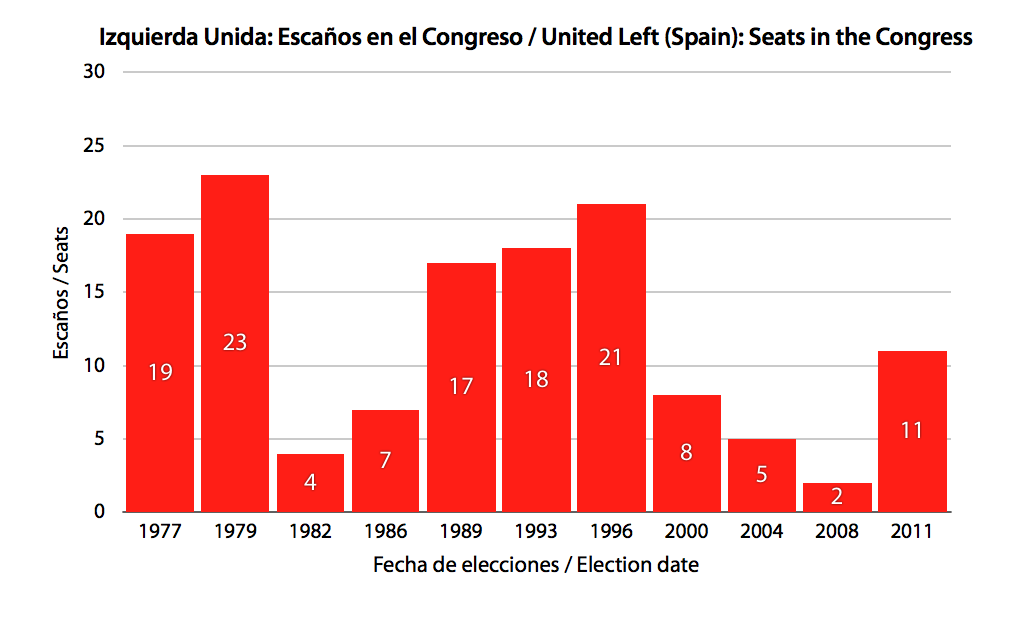
Congress seats from 1977 (as PCE) to 2011.

Cortes Generales
Election	Leading candidate	Congress			Senate			Gov.
Election	Leading candidate	Votes	%	Seats	Votes	%	Seats	Gov.
1986	Gerardo Iglesias	935,504	4.6 (#5)	7 / 350	2,583,230	4.7 (#5)	0 / 208	No
1989	Julio Anguita	1,858,588	9.1 (#3)	17 / 350	4,866,930	8.8 (#3)	1 / 208	No
1993	Julio Anguita	2,253,722	9.6 (#3)	18 / 350	6,172,255	9.5 (#3)	0 / 208	No
1996	Julio Anguita	2,639,774	10.5 (#3)	21 / 350	6,851,023	10.0 (#3)	0 / 208	No
2000	Francisco Frutos	1,263,043	5.4 (#3)	8 / 350	4,752,113	7.7 (#3)	0 / 208	No
2004	Gaspar Llamazares	1,284,081	5.0 (#3)	5 / 350	2,857,366	4.1 (#4)	1 / 208	No
2008	Gaspar Llamazares	969,946	3.8 (#3)	2 / 350	2,015,249	2.9 (#5)	1 / 208	No
2011	Cayo Lara	Within Plural Left		7 / 350	Within Plural Left		0 / 208	No
2015	Alberto Garzón	Within Popular Unity		2 / 350	Within Popular Unity		0 / 208	—
2016	Pablo Iglesias	Within Unidos Podemos		8 / 350	Within Unidos Podemos		2 / 208	No (Note: 2016–2018.)
2016	Pablo Iglesias	Within Unidos Podemos		8 / 350	Within Unidos Podemos		2 / 208	(Note: Confidence and supply (2018–2019).)
Apr. 2019	Pablo Iglesias	Within Unidas Podemos		5 / 350	Within Unidas Podemos		0 / 208	—
Nov. 2019	Pablo Iglesias	Within Unidas Podemos		5 / 350	Within Unidas Podemos		0 / 208	Yes
2023	Yolanda Díaz	Within Sumar		5 / 350	Within Sumar		0 / 208	Yes

=== European Parliament ===
European Parliament
Election	Leading candidate	Votes	%	Seats	EP Group
1987	Fernando Pérez Royo	1,011,830	5.3 (#4)	3 / 60	COM
1989	Fernando Pérez Royo	961,742	6.1 (#4)	4 / 60	COM (EUL)
1994	Alonso Puerta	2,497,671	13.4 (#3)	9 / 64	EUL
1999	Alonso Puerta	1,221,566	5.8 (#3)	4 / 64	GUE/NGL
2004	Willy Meyer	643,136	4.1 (#4)	2 / 54	GUE/NGL
2009	Willy Meyer	Within The Left		2 / 54	GUE/NGL
2014	Willy Meyer	Within Plural Left		4 / 54	GUE/NGL
2019	María Eugenia Rodríguez Palop	Within UPCE		2 / 59	GUE/NGL
2024	Estrella Galán	Within Sumar		0 / 61	—
