= 12th Federal Assembly of United Left (Spain) =

Spanish party leadership election

12th Federal Assembly of IU
← 2016	15–19 March 2021 (primary); 26–27 March 2021 (assembly)	2024 →

560 delegates in the 12th Federal Assembly of IU Plurality of delegates needed to win
- Registered: 18,036 (primary)
- Turnout: 7,467 (41.4%) (primary)
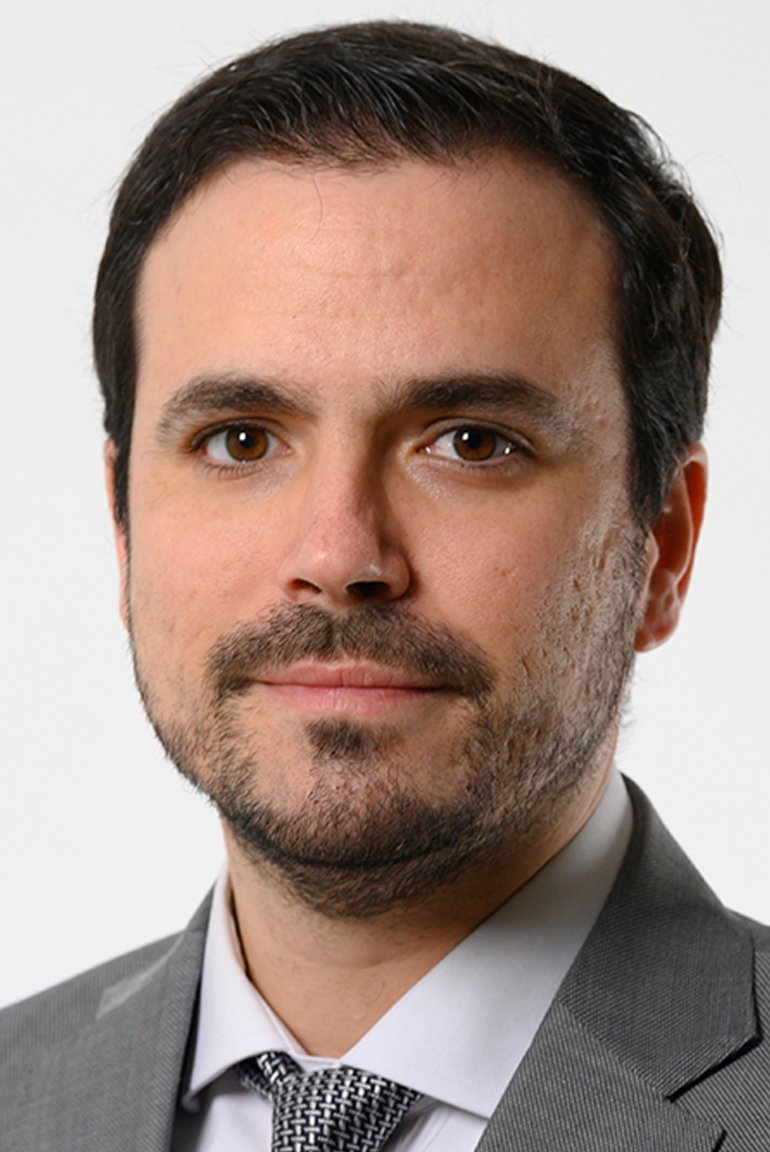

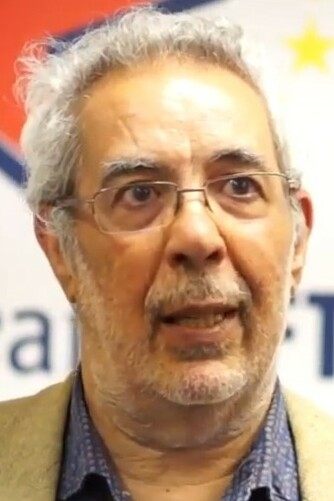
Candidate	Alberto Garzón	José Antonio García Rubio
Popular vote	5,694 (76.3%)	1,553 (20.8%)
Delegate vote	Unopposed	Eliminated
Coordinator before election
Alberto Garzón
Elected Coordinator
Alberto Garzón

The 12th Federal Assembly of United Left was held in Madrid from 26 March to 27 March 2021, to renovate the governing bodies of the United Left (IU) and establish the party's main lines of action and strategy for the next leadership term. The federal assembly was initially scheduled for July 2020, but it was postponed as a result of COVID-19 pandemic.

The congress was held following the November 2019 Spanish general election when the alliance managed to enter the government for the first time since the Second Republic. The incumbent general coordinator and Minister of Consumer Affairs Alberto Garzón was reelected for a second term with 76.3% of the vote, thus defeating the candidacy of José Antonio García Rubio; who was supported by former leading figures of IU against the alliance with Podemos and got 20.8% of the vote.

The approved political document called for a bigger integration of IU within the Unidas Podemos alliance, eventually leading to an organizational convergence with Podemos. However, these plans were halted by the establishment of the Sumar platform led by Yolanda Díaz, former member of IU, ahead of the 2023 Spanish general election.

== Candidates ==
Candidate	Age	Notable positions	Announced	Eliminated	Campaign	Ref.
=== Elected ===
Candidate elected as general coordinator.
Alberto Garzón	35	Minister of Consumer Affairs (since 2020); General Coordinator of United Left (since 2016); Deputy in the Cortes Generales for Málaga and Madrid (since 2011)	18 February 2021	Elected	(avanzandohacialarepublica.org)	
=== Proclaimed ===
Candidates who met the endorsement requirement and were officially proclaimed to contest the primary election.
José Antonio García Rubio	72	Federal Secretary of Economy and Employment of IU (2012–2020)	24 October 2020	22 March 2021	(La Izquierda Necesaria)	

== Endorsements ==
=== Total ===
Candidates seeking to run were required to collect the endorsements of at least 2% of the total party members (≈361 endorsements).

Summary of candidate endorsement results
Candidate	Endorsements		
Candidate	Count	% T	% V
Alberto Garzón	≈2,208	12.24	76.19
José Antonio García Rubio	≈690	3.82	23.81
Total	2,898		
Valid endorsements	2,898	16.07	
Not endorsing	15,138	83.93	
Total members	18,036		

Endorsements by party members
Garzón	76.19%
García Rubio	23.81%

=== Public endorsements ===
==== Alberto Garzón ====
Alberto Garzón's endorsements
- José Luis Centella, President of the Communist Party of Spain (since 2018), Former Secretary-General of the Communist Party of Spain (2009–2017), Member of the Congress of Deputies for Málaga and Seville (1993–2004 and 2011–2015)
- Antonio Maíllo, Former General Coordinator of United Left/The Greens–Assembly for Andalusia (2013–2019), Member of the Parliament of Andalusia for Cádiz (2015–2019)
- Inmaculada Nieto, Spokesperson of the Forward Andalusia Group in the Parliament of Andalusia (since 2019), Former Member of the Parliament of Andalusia for Seville (since 2012)
- Rosa Pérez, Regional Participation, Transparency, Cooperation and Democratic Quality of the Valencian Community (since 2019), General Coordinator of United Left of the Valencian Country (since 2018), Member of the Corts Valencianes for Valencia (since 2019)
- Sira Rego, Member of the European Parliament for Spain (since 2019), Former Deputy Mayor of Rivas-Vaciamadrid (2015–2019), Former City Councillor of Rivas-Vaciamadrid (2015–2019)
- Enrique Santiago, Secretary-General of the Communist Party of Spain (since 2018), Member of the Congress of Deputies for Madrid (since 2019), Former Secretary-General of the Communist Youth Union of Spain (1990–1993)

==== José Antonio García Rubio ====
José Antonio García Rubio's endorsements
- Lidia Falcón, President of the Feminist Party of Spain (since 1983)
- Francisco Guarido, Mayor of Zamora (since 2015), City Councillor of Zamora (since 1999)
- Cayo Lara, General Coordinator of United Left (2008–2016), Member of the Congress of Deputies for Madrid (2011–2016)
- José Luis Pérez Tapias, Mayor of Fuenteheridos (since 2019)

== Results ==
Summary of the 15–27 March 2021 IU assembly results
Candidate	Primary		Assembly	
Candidate	Votes	%	Votes	%
Alberto Garzón	5,694	76.26	Unopposed	
José Antonio García Rubio	1,553	20.80	Eliminated	
Blank ballots	220	2.94	—	
Total	7,467		—	
Valid votes	7,467	100.00	—	
Invalid votes	0	0.00	—	
Votes cast / turnout	7,467	41.40	—	
Abstentions	10,569	58.60	—	
Registered voters	18,036		560	

Vote by party members
Garzón	76.26%
García Rubio	20.80%
Blank ballots	2.94%

=== By region ===
Region	Electorate	Turnout	Alberto Garzón		José Antonio García Rubio	
Region	Electorate	Turnout	Votes	%	Votes	%
Andalusia	5,404	46.21	2,162	86.58	290	11.61
Aragon	779	24.65	167	86.98	22	11.46
Asturias	1,910	48.22	432	46.91	388	42.13
Balearic Islands	210	17.14	27	75.00	7	19.44
Basque Country	320	50.94	146	89.57	15	9.20
Canary Islands	254	31.89	46	56.79	34	41.98
Cantabria	153	39.22	47	78.33	13	21.67
Castile and León	1,034	47.49	313	63.75	171	34.83
Castilla–La Mancha	1,016	40.55	310	75.24	95	23.06
Catalonia	763	34.60	237	89.77	26	9.85
Ceuta	8	25.00	2	100.00	0	0.00
Extremadura	478	33.68	118	73.29	34	21.12
Galicia	591	26.23	113	72.90	30	19.35
La Rioja	114	63.16	42	58.33	30	41.67
Madrid	1,834	38.99	643	89.93	55	7.69
Melilla	1	0.00	0	0.00	0	0.00
Murcia	599	31.05	155	83.33	25	13.44
Navarre	288	41.32	81	68.07	36	30.25
Valencian Community	2,226	40.84	629	69.20	275	30.25
Exterior	54	57.41	24	77.42	7	22.58
Total	18,036	41.40	5,694	76.26	1,553	20.80
