= 13th Federal Assembly of United Left (Spain) =

Spanish party leadership election

13th Federal Assembly of IU
- 7–12 May 2024 (primary); 18–19 May 2024 (assembly)

90 (of 150) delegates in the 11th Federal Assembly of IU Plurality of delegates needed to win
- Registered: 16,046 (primary)
- Turnout: 3,850 (52.1%) (primary)
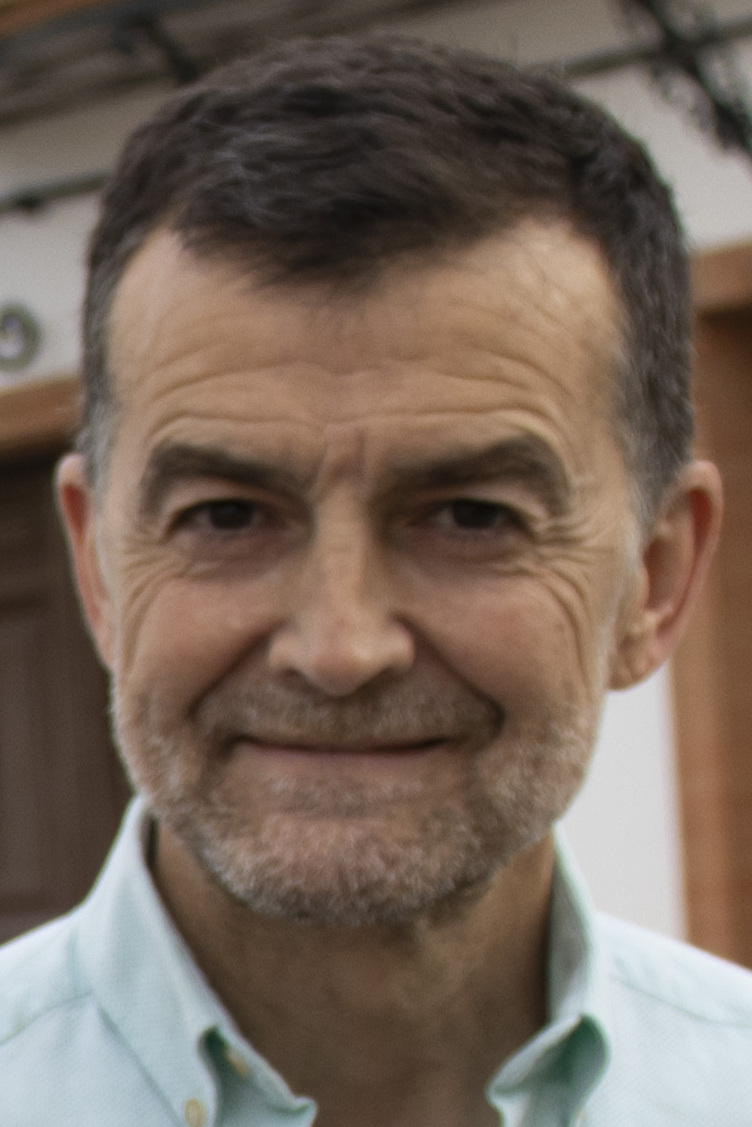

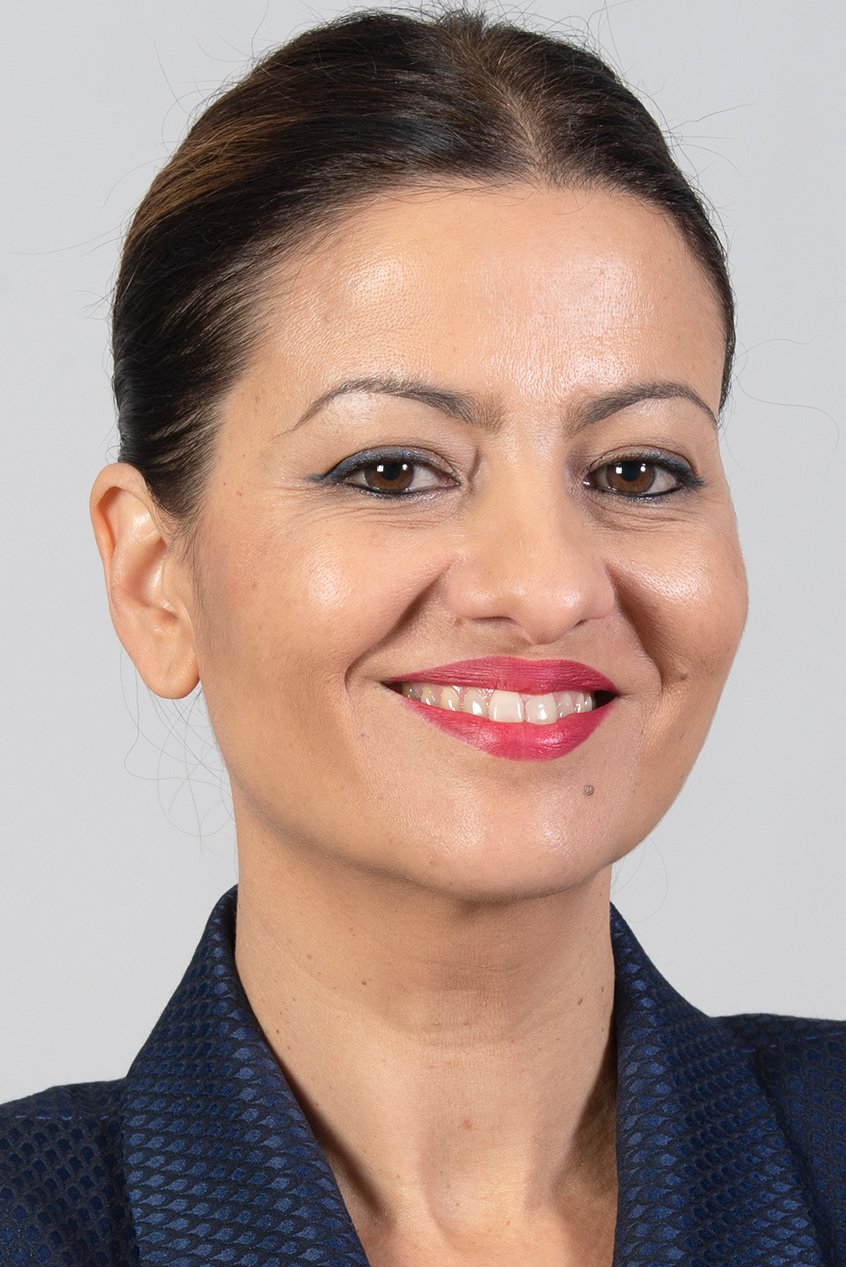

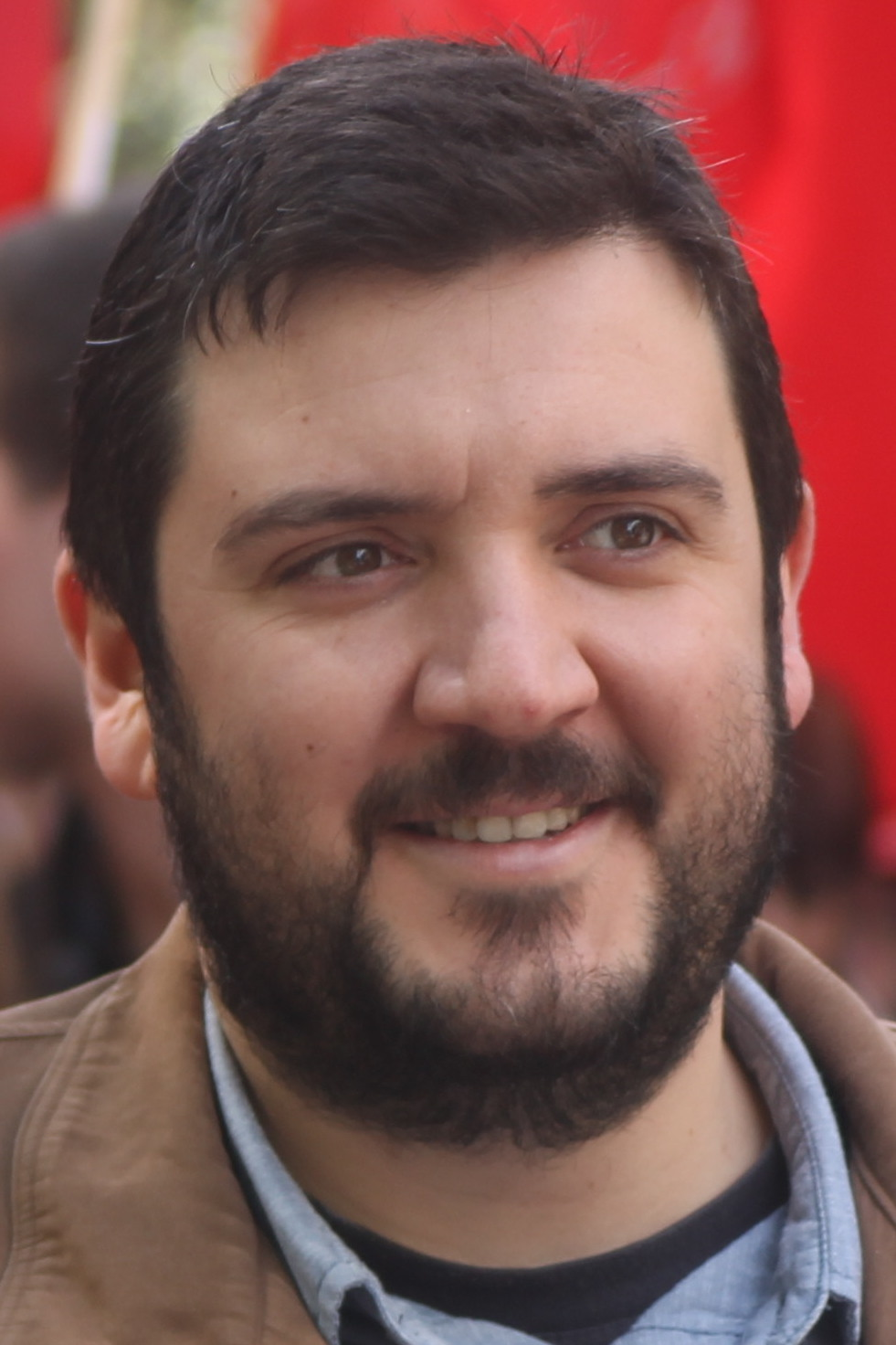

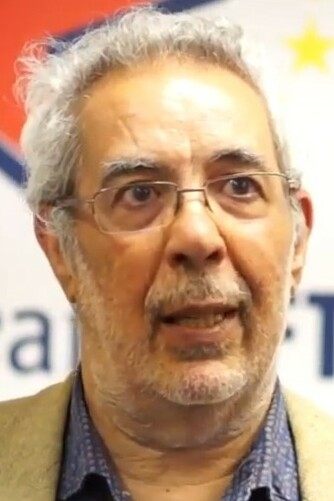
| Candidate | Antonio Maíllo | Sira Rego | Álvaro Aguilera |
| Popular vote | 4,463 (53.4%) | 1,957 (23.4%) | 1,178 (14.1%) |
| Candidate | José Antonio García Rubio |
| Popular vote | 696 (8.3%) |
Coordinator before election
Enrique Santiago (acting)
Elected Coordinator
Antonio Maíllo

The 13th Federal Assembly of United Left was held in Madrid from 18 May to 19 May 2024, to renovate the governing bodies of the United Left (IU) and establish the party's main lines of action and strategy for the next leadership term.

The leadership election takes place in order to replace Alberto Garzón as coordinator after he resigned in late November 2023. Besides, the assembly is expected to clarify United Left's relation with Sumar, the electoral platform launched by Labour Minister Yolanda Díaz ahead of the 2023 Spanish general election.

Four candidates were running to replace Garzón: Sira Rego, Minister of Youth and Children and former member of the European parliament; Antonio Maíllo, former coordinator of United Left in Andalusia and former member of that region's parliament; José Antonio García Rubio, member of the party's board; and Álvaro Aguilera, coordinator of United Left in the Community of Madrid and secretary general of the branch of the Communist Party of Spain in that region.

After Garzón resigned, negotiations started among the different factions in United Left to find common ground ahead of the assembly. However, in March, Rego, who was widely regarded as Garzón's replacement as she was United Left's only minister in the government, unilaterally announced her candidacy. This movement led to many sectors in the party to seek an alternative candidate, who ended being Antonio Maillo. While negotiations continued until late April, a uniting candidate could not be found as differences were too big.

== Candidates ==
| Candidate | Age | Notable positions | Announced | Eliminated | Campaign | Ref. |
=== Elected ===
Candidate elected as general coordinator.
| Antonio Maíllo | 57 | General Coordinator of United Left/The Greens–Assembly for Andalusia (2013–2019); Member of the Parliament of Andalusia for Cádiz (2015–2019) | 21 April 2024 | Elected | | |
=== Proclaimed ===
Candidates who met the endorsement requirement and were officially proclaimed to contest the primary election.
| Sira Rego | 50 | Minister of Youth and Children (since 2023); Member of the European Parliament for Spain (2019–2023); City Councillor of Rivas-Vaciamadrid (2007–2019) | 13 March 2024 | 14 May 2024 | (arribalasqueluchan.org) | |
| Álvaro Aguilera | 38 | General Coordinator of United Left–Madrid (since 2020); General Secretary of the Communist Party of Madrid (since 2014); City Councillor of Brunete (2011–2015) | 26 April 2024 | 14 May 2024 | | |
| José Antonio García Rubio | 75 | Federal Secretary of Economy and Employment of IU (2012–2020) | 14 March 2024 | 14 May 2024 | (La Izquierda Necesaria) | |

== Endorsements ==
=== Total ===
Candidates seeking to run were required to collect the endorsements of at least 2% of the total party members (≈321 endorsements).

Summary of candidate endorsement results
| Candidate | Endorsements | | |
| Candidate | Count | % T | % V |
|---|---|---|---|
| Antonio Maíllo | 963 | 6.00 | 38.53 |
| Álvaro Aguilera | 593 | 3.70 | 23.73 |
| Sira Rego | 520 | 3.24 | 20.81 |
| José Antonio García Rubio | 423 | 2.64 | 16.93 |
| Total | 2,499 | | |
| Valid endorsements | 2,499 | 15.57 | |
| Not endorsing | 13,547 | 84.43 | |
| Total members | 16,046 | | |

Endorsements by party members
| Maíllo | 38.53% |
| Aguilera | 23.73% |
| Rego | 20.81% |
| García Rubio | 16.93% |

== Results ==
Summary of the 15–27 March 2021 IU assembly results
| Candidate | Primary | | Assembly | |
| Candidate | Votes | % | Votes | % |
|---|---|---|---|---|
| Antonio Maíllo | 4,463 | 53.45 | Unopposed | |
| Sira Rego | 1,957 | 23.44 | Eliminated | |
| Álvaro Aguilera | 1,178 | 14.11 | Eliminated | |
| José Antonio García Rubio | 696 | 8.33 | Eliminated | |
| Blank ballots | 56 | 0.67 | —N/a | |
| Total | 8,350 | | —N/a | |
| Valid votes | 8,350 | 100.00 | —N/a | |
| Invalid votes | 0 | 0.00 | —N/a | |
| Votes cast / turnout | 8,350 | 52.05 | —N/a | |
| Abstentions | 7,696 | 47.97 | —N/a | |
| Registered voters | 16,046 | | 130 | |

Vote by party members
| Maíllo | 53.45% |
| Rego | 23.44% |
| Aguilera | 14.11% |
| García Rubio | 8.33% |
| Blank ballots | 0.67% |
