= 11th Federal Assembly of United Left (Spain) =

Spanish party leadership election

11th Federal Assembly of IU
- 26–29 May 2016 (primary); 4–5 June 2016 (assembly)

90 (of 150) delegates in the 11th Federal Assembly of IU Plurality of delegates needed to win
- Registered: 22,321 (primary)
- Turnout: 8,548 (38.30%) (primary); 101 (67.33%) (assembly)
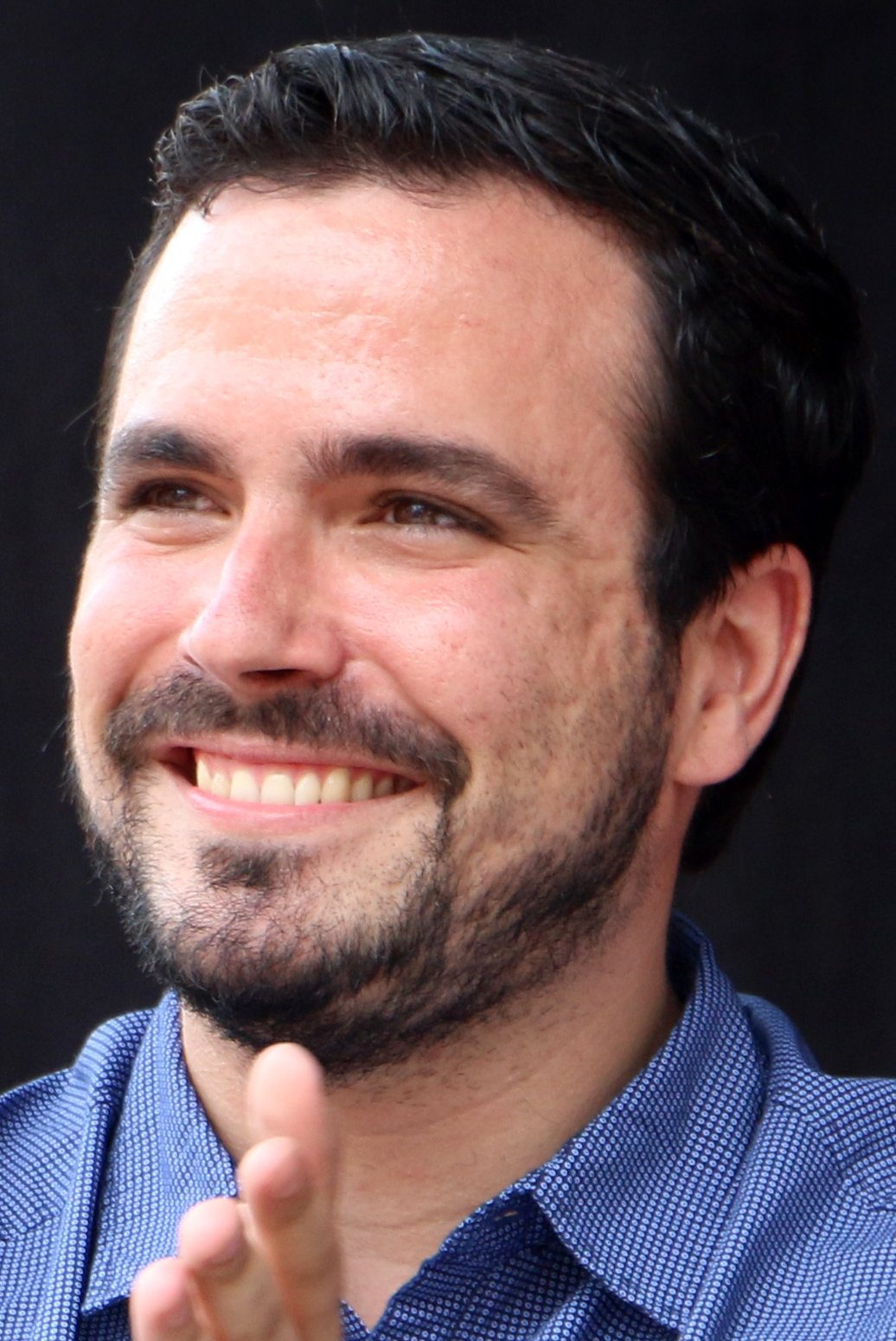

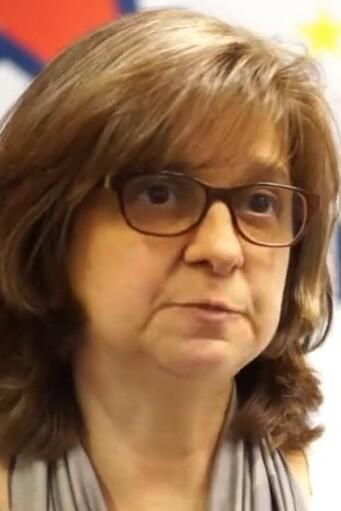

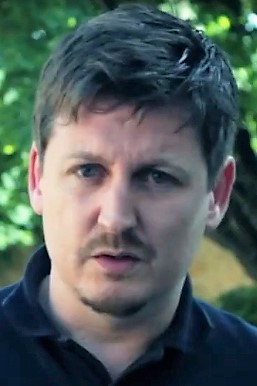
Candidate	Alberto Garzón	Paloma López Bermejo	Tasio Oliver
Popular vote	6,382 (74.7%)	1,776 (20.8%)	390 (4.6%)
Delegate count	68	18	4
Executive vote	83 (82.18%)	Eliminated	Eliminated
Coordinator before election
Cayo Lara
Elected Coordinator
Alberto Garzón

The 11th Federal Assembly of United Left was held in Madrid from 4 June to 5 June 2016, to renovate the governing bodies of United Left (IU) and establish the party's main lines of action and strategy for the next leadership term. A primary election to elect the new general coordinator of the party was held from 26 May to 29 May 2016. This was the first leadership election in IU's history in which all the party members were allowed to vote.

The congress was held just before the 2016 Spanish general election, which IU contested in a coalition with Podemos. This decision produced an internal rift, leaving the party divided into three factions. The first one was composed of incumbent General Coordinator Cayo Lara and members of the old guard who were radically against any alliance with Podemos. The second was led by IU's spokesman in the Congress of Deputies Alberto Garzón—who was contesting the general election for Unidos Podemos—and received the support of the majority sector of the Communist Party of Spain (PCE) and of most of the IU federations. The third sector was made up of members of Open Left (IzAb), the party led by former general coordinator Gaspar Llamazares, a longtime critic of Lara's leadership.

The leadership election saw a generational renovation with Garzón becoming the new general coordinator in a landslide as he received 74.7% of the members vote. Meanwhile, the candidacy of Paloma López Bermejo—supported by Lara and the old guard—received 20.8% of the vote and the candidate of IzAb, Tasio Oliver, finished last with just 4.6% of support.

== Candidates ==
Candidate	Age	Notable positions	Announced	Eliminated	Ref.
=== Elected ===
Candidate elected as general coordinator.
Alberto Garzón	30	Deputy in the Cortes Generales for Málaga and Madrid (since 2011)	26 March 2016	Elected	
=== Proclaimed ===
Candidates who met the endorsement requirement and were officially proclaimed to contest the primary election.
Paloma López Bermejo	54	Member of the European Parliament for Spain (since 2014); Secretary of Employment and Migrations of Workers' Commissions (2008–2014)	20 April 2016	30 May 2016	
Tasio Oliver	38	Mayor of Castilleja de Guzmán (since 2015); City Councillor of Castilleja de Guzmán (since 2007)	15 March 2016	30 May 2016	
=== Withdrawn ===
Candidates who met the endorsement requirement but withdrew prior to the primary election.
Álvaro García Mancheño	?	City Councillor of Pedrera (since 2007); Member of the Parliament of Andalusia for Seville (2014–2015)	16 May 2016	–	

== Endorsements ==
=== Total ===
Candidates seeking to run were required to collect the endorsements of at least 400 party members or 5% of the total Federal Political Council (CPF) members.

Summary of candidate endorsement results
Candidate	Endorsements					
Candidate	Party members			CPF members		
Candidate	Count	% T	% V	Count	% T	% V
Alberto Garzón	2,813	12.60	63.11	99	40.57	57.89
Paloma López Bermejo	794	3.56	17.81	27	11.07	15.79
Tasio Oliver	422	1.89	9.47	24	9.84	14.04
Álvaro García Mancheño	318	1.42	7.13	18	7.38	10.53
Others	110	0.49	2.47	3	1.23	1.75
Total	4,457			171		
Valid endorsements	4,457	16.07		171	70.08	
Not endorsing	17,864	83.93		73	29.92	
Total members	22,321			244		

Endorsements by party members
Garzón	63.11%
López Bermejo	17.81%
Oliver	9.47%
García Mancheño	7.13%
Others	2.47%

Endorsements by CPF members
Garzón	57.89%
López Bermejo	15.79%
Oliver	14.04%
García Mancheño	10.53%
Others	1.75%

=== Public endorsements ===
==== Alberto Garzón ====
Alberto Garzón's endorsements
- Marina Albiol, Member of the European Parliament for Spain (since 2014), Member of the Corts Valencianes (2007–2014)
- José Luis Centella, Secretary-General of the Communist Party of Spain (since 2009), Member of the Congress of Deputies for Málaga and Seville (1993–2004 and 2011–2015)
- Yolanda Díaz, National Coordinator United Left Galicia (since 2005), Member of the Congress of Deputies for A Coruña (since 2016), Member of the Parliament of Galicia for A Coruña (2012–2016)
- Joan Josep Nuet, National Coordinator of United and Alternative Left (since 2012), Member of the Parliament of Catalonia for Barcelona (since 2015), Member of the Congress of Deputies for Barcelona (2011–2015)
- Toni Valero, Secretary of Organization and Finance of United Left/The Greens–Assembly for Andalusia (since 2013)

==== Paloma López Bermejo ====
Paloma López Bermejo's endorsements
- José Antonio García Rubio, Federal Secretary of Economy and Employment of IU (since 2012)
- Francisco Guarido, Mayor of Zamora (since 2015), City Councillor of Zamora (since 1999)
- Cayo Lara, General Coordinator of United Left (since 2008), Member of the Congress of Deputies for Madrid (2011–2016)
- Diego Valderas, Vice President of the Regional Government of Andalusia (2012–2015), General Coordinator of United Left/The Greens–Assembly for Andalusia (2000–2013), President of the Parliament of Andalusia (1994–1996), Member of the Parliament of Andalusia for Huelva (1986–2000 and 2008–2015)
- Ángela Vallina, Member of the European Parliament for Spain (since 2014), Mayor of Castrillón (2003–2004 and 2007–2014)

==== Tasio Oliver ====
Tasio Oliver's endorsements
- Teresa Araguren, Member of the Board of Directors of RTVE (since 2007)
- Gaspar Llamazares, General Coordinator of United Left (2008–2016), Member of the Congress of Deputies for Asturias and Madrid (2000–2015)

Political Parties

- Open Left (IzAb)

==== Álvaro García Mancheño ====
Álvaro García Mancheño's endorsements

Political Parties

- Unitarian Candidacy of Workers (CUT)

== Results ==
Summary of the 26 May–5 June 2016 IU assembly results
Candidate	Primary			Assembly	
Candidate	Votes	%	Del.	Votes	%
Alberto Garzón	6,382	74.66	68	83	82.18
Paloma López Bermejo	1,776	20.78	18	Eliminated	
Tasio Oliver	390	4.56	4	Eliminated	
Blank ballots	0	0.00		18	17.82
Total	8,548		90	101	
Valid votes	8,548	100.00		101	67.33
Invalid votes	0	0.00		0	0.00
Votes cast / turnout	8,548	38.30		101	67.33
Abstentions	13,773	61.70		49	32.67
Registered voters	22,321			150	

Vote by party members
Garzón	74.66%
López Bermejo	20.78%
Oliver	4.56%

Vote by delegates
Garzón	82.18%
Blank ballots	17.82%
