= Ione Belarra =

Spanish politician (born 1987)

Ione Belarra MP
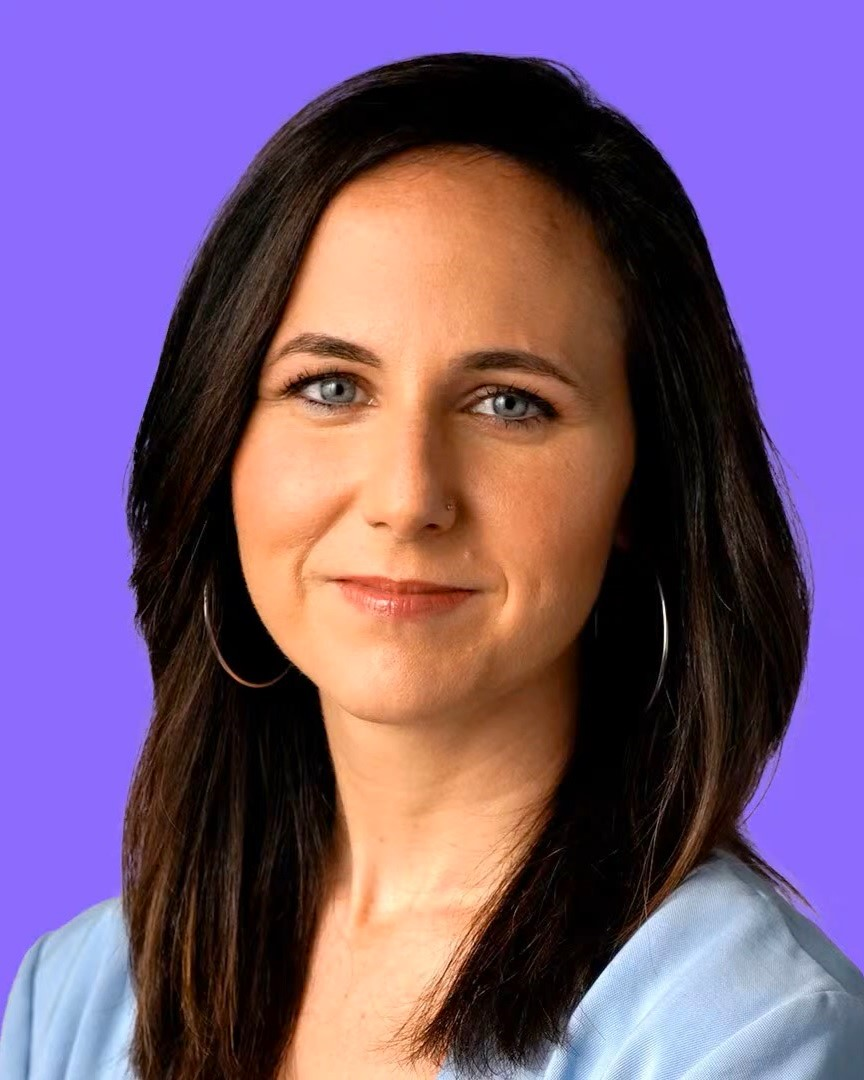
- Belarra in 2023

Minister of Social Rights and 2030 Agenda
- In office 31 March 2021 – 21 November 2023
- Prime Minister: Pedro Sánchez
- Preceded by: Pablo Iglesias
- Succeeded by: Pablo Bustinduy (Social Rights, Consumer Affairs and 2030 Agenda); Sira Rego (Youth and Children)

Secretary General of Podemos
- Incumbent
- Assumed office 13 June 2021
- Preceded by: Pablo Iglesias

Secretary of State for the 2030 Agenda
- In office 15 January 2020 – 31 March 2021
- Prime Minister: Pedro Sánchez
- Succeeded by: Enrique Santiago

Member of the Congress of Deputies
- Incumbent
- Assumed office 13 January 2016
- Constituency: Navarre (2016–2023); Madrid (since 2023)

Personal details
- Born: Ione Belarra Urteaga; 25 September 1987 (age 39) Pamplona, Navarre, Spain
- Party: Podemos (since 2014)
- Domestic partner: Ignacio Ramos Delgado (since 2021)
- Children: 2
- Education: Autonomous University of Madrid

Ione Belarra Urteaga (born 25 September 1987) is a Spanish politician from the party Podemos who served as Minister of Social Rights and 2030 Agenda from 2021 to 2023. She has been her party's leader since June 2021.

She is a member of the State Citizen Council of Podemos. She was first elected to the Congress of Deputies in the 2015 election, representing the constituency of Navarre, and switched to the Madrid constituency in 2023.

== Early life and education ==
Born in Pamplona, Navarre, Belarra graduated in psychology in 2012 from the Autonomous University of Madrid, where she was a classmate of Irene Montero. She earned a master's degree in education; she and Montero left their doctoral programmes because of their political careers.

She has worked in research on issues related to education, migratory experiences, and human rights. During those years she has served as an activist and volunteer in various organizations, such as SOS Racismo and the Spanish Red Cross, and in platforms and campaigns for the closure of the Centers for the Internment of Foreigners (CIEs), as well as in various mobilizations in defense of the human rights of people in situations of special vulnerability.

One of Belarra's earliest activist campaigns was against immigrant detention centres.

== Political career ==
=== Early career (2014–2019) ===
Belarra joined Podemos in its founding year, 2014. The following year, she entered its national executive, the Citizens' Council, where she was put in charge of the area of human rights, citizenship and diversity. She led Podemos's list in the Navarre constituency in the 2015 Spanish general election, being one of two Podemos members elected by the region. From July 2018, she and Pablo Echenique filled in as parliamentary and general spokespeople of Podemos, respectively, during Montero and Pablo Iglesias's joint maternity/paternity leave.

=== In government (2020–2023) ===
After the November 2019 Spanish general election, Podemos entered government with the Spanish Socialist Workers' Party (PSOE), and Belarra became Secretary of State for the 2030 Agenda from January 2020 to March 2021. She then became Minister of Social Rights and 2030 Agenda.

After Iglesias's retirement, Belarra was voted secretary general of Podemos with 88.69% of the members' votes in June 2021, while Yolanda Díaz succeeded Iglesias as leader of Unidas Podemos.

In 2022, Belarra introduced legislation to ban the sale of pets in shops, convert zoos into wildlife recovery centres and impose prison sentences for abusers as part of Spain's first animal-rights bill, which notably did not target bullfighting. A month later, the PSOE group in the Congress of Deputies tabled an amendment to restrict the scope of the text, excluding animals related to hunting, a decision which was strongly criticised by Unidas Podemos.

Despite this disagreement, the two parties voted together in Congress on 6 October to reject the motions to reject the bill tabled by the People's Party (PP), Vox and the Basque Nationalist Party (PNV).

For the 2023 Spanish general election, Belarra switched to the Madrid constituency and ran fifth on the list of Sumar, the new left-wing alliance founded by Yolanda Díaz. The list came third, winning six seats.

In October 2023, Belarra accused the EU and the US of "being complicit in Israel's war crimes" and called for Israel to be denounced before the International Criminal Court because of what she identified as ongoing "planned genocide" in the Gaza Strip against the Palestinian peoples.

=== Post-government (2023–present) ===
In November 2023, Pedro Sánchez formed his third government, without Belarra or any other members of Podemos. Podemos then split from Sumar, and its five deputies sat in the mixed group in parliament.

Following the Torre-Pacheco unrest in July 2025, Belarra accused the Spanish police of being infiltrated by neo-fascist ideology. The police union filed a complaint with the Supreme Court of Spain for alleged defamation.
