= Leadership opinion polling for the 2016 Spanish general election =

In the run up to the 2016 Spanish general election, various organisations carried out opinion polling to gauge the opinions that voters hold towards political leaders. Results of such polls are displayed in this article. The date range for these opinion polls is from the previous general election, held on 20 December 2015, to the day the next election was held, on 26 June 2016.

== Preferred prime minister ==
The table below lists opinion polling on leader preferences to become prime minister.

Polling firm/Commissioner	Fieldwork date	Sample size						Other/ None/ Not care	Question	Lead
Polling firm/Commissioner	Fieldwork date	Sample size	Rajoy PP	Sánchez PSOE	Iglesias Podemos	Rivera C's	Garzón IU	Other/ None/ Not care	Question	Lead
InvyMark/laSexta	17–19 Jun 2016	1,200	25.1	21.3	28.0	12.3	–	–	13.3	2.9
TNS Demoscopia	13–19 Jun 2016	500	20.5	17.5	16.0	15.6	–	9.9	20.5	3.0
InvyMark/laSexta	15–16 Jun 2016	?	25.7	23.2	25.6	12.9	–	–	12.6	0.1
MyWord/Cadena SER	13–16 Jun 2016	1,502	14.7	16.4	26.0	20.5	–	–	22.4	5.5
TNS Demoscopia	6–12 Jun 2016	500	19.3	18.9	18.2	16.6	–	8.0	18.9	0.4
GESOP/El Periódico	3–7 Jun 2016	1,816	23.0	17.5	21.5	16.7	–	15.9	5.4	1.5
GAD3/La Vanguardia	6–9 Jun 2016	1,016	23.2	16.9	16.3	11.3	–	27.9	4.4	6.3
Metroscopia/El País	31 May–1 Jun 2016	1,200	21.0	24.0	19.0	21.0	–	–	15.0	3.0
InvyMark/laSexta	9–13 May 2016	?	24.5	23.6	25.5	14.5	–	–	11.9	1.0
IMOP/Llorente & Cuenca	6–10 Apr 2016	1,027	23.4	27.1	11.9	21.9	12.3	3.4		3.7
GESOP/El Periódico	5–8 Mar 2016	1,000	20.5	22.6	12.7	18.9	11.0	10.6	3.7	2.1
InvyMark/laSexta	21–23 Dec 2015	?	27.0	20.3	26.3	12.8	–	–	13.6	0.7

== Predicted prime minister ==
The table below lists opinion polling on the perceived likelihood for each leader to become prime minister.

Polling firm/Commissioner	Fieldwork date	Sample size					Other/ None/ Not care	Question	Lead
Polling firm/Commissioner	Fieldwork date	Sample size	Rajoy PP	Sánchez PSOE	Iglesias Podemos	Rivera C's	Other/ None/ Not care	Question	Lead
InvyMark/laSexta	17–19 Jun 2016	1,200	45.3	13.7	10.8	1.6	–	28.6	31.6
TNS Demoscopia	13–19 Jun 2016	500	40.5	19.4	11.8	3.3	2.5	22.5	21.1
InvyMark/laSexta	15–16 Jun 2016	?	47.1	14.7	7.5	1.1	–	29.6	32.4
GAD3/ABC	13–16 Jun 2016	1,400	38.3	10.1	8.6	1.2	41.8		28.2
TNS Demoscopia	6–12 Jun 2016	500	42.7	15.7	11.3	3.9	1.5	24.9	27.0
Metroscopia/El País	31 May–1 Jun 2016	1,200	46.0	27.0	8.0	4.0	–	15.0	19.0
GAD3/ABC	23–26 May 2016	1,000	37.6	13.4	4.5	1.0	43.5		24.2
Encuestamos	2–22 May 2016	2,000	35.2	28.6	29.5	4.8	6.8	–	5.7
InvyMark/laSexta	9–13 May 2016	?	54.0	18.4	7.1	1.6	–	18.9	35.6
GAD3/ABC	26–29 Apr 2016	800	33.7	17.4	1.6	2.6	10.3	34.3	16.3
Encuestamos	1–20 Apr 2016	2,000	35.2	35.1	13.0	5.8	10.9	–	0.1
GAD3/ABC	6–7 Apr 2016	800	26.8	33.2	2.2	2.8	10.3	24.8	6.4
Encuestamos	1–20 Mar 2016	2,000	28.5	36.1	13.1	6.0	16.3	–	7.6
GAD3/ABC	7–10 Mar 2016	800	25.3	28.8	2.9	3.7	17.3	22.0	3.5
Encuestamos	1–17 Feb 2016	1,800	9.2	49.9	4.1	2.8	34.0	–	40.7
GAD3/ABC	8–11 Feb 2016	800	21.1	40.0	3.1	2.4	12.1	21.2	18.9
GAD3/ABC	15–21 Jan 2016	802	32.5	31.7	4.4	3.2	10.3	17.9	0.8

== Leader ratings ==
The table below lists opinion polling on leader ratings, on a 0–10 scale: 0 would stand for a "terrible" rating, whereas 10 would stand for "excellent".

Polling firm/Commissioner	Fieldwork date	Sample size					
Polling firm/Commissioner	Fieldwork date	Sample size	Rajoy PP	Sánchez PSOE	Iglesias Podemos/UP	Rivera C's	Garzón IU
CIS	4–22 May 2016	17,488	3.09	3.99	3.41	4.17	4.81
CIS	1–10 Apr 2016	2,490	2.89	3.74	3.16	3.99	4.69
CIS	2–11 Jan 2016	2,496	3.08	3.75	3.78	3.92	4.68

== Approval ratings ==
The tables below list the public approval ratings of the leaders and leading candidates of the main political parties in Spain.

=== Mariano Rajoy ===
Polling firm/Commissioner	Fieldwork date	Sample size	Mariano Rajoy (PP)			
Polling firm/Commissioner	Fieldwork date	Sample size	check	X mark	Question	Net
Simple Lógica	1–15 Jun 2016	1,226	26.2	66.2	7.6	−40.0
Metroscopia/El País	7–8 Jun 2016	1,200	30.0	70.0	0.0	−40.0
Metroscopia/El País	31 May–1 Jun 2016	1,200	28.0	71.0	1.0	−43.0
Simple Lógica	2–10 May 2016	1,035	23.0	70.3	6.6	−47.3
Metroscopia/El País	26–28 Apr 2016	1,200	25.0	75.0	0.0	−50.0
Simple Lógica	4–12 Apr 2016	1,047	22.6	73.9	3.5	−51.3
Metroscopia	5–6 Apr 2016	1,200	27.0	73.0	0.0	−46.0
Metroscopia/El País	28–30 Mar 2016	1,200	25.0	74.0	1.0	−49.0
Metroscopia/El País	8–9 Mar 2016	1,200	28.0	72.0	0.0	−44.0
Simple Lógica	1–9 Mar 2016	1,206	25.4	71.9	2.6	−46.5
Simple Lógica	1–5 Feb 2016	1,048	27.3	69.6	3.1	−42.3
Metroscopia/El País	4 Feb 2016	600	34.0	65.0	1.0	−31.0
Metroscopia/El País	3–4 Feb 2016	1,000	30.0	69.0	1.0	−39.0
Metroscopia/El País	2 Feb 2016	?	33.0	66.0	1.0	−33.0
Metroscopia/El País	20–21 Jan 2016	1,200	33.0	66.0	1.0	−33.0
Metroscopia/El País	12–14 Jan 2016	1,200	35.0	64.0	1.0	−29.0
Simple Lógica	4–12 Jan 2016	1,050	30.3	65.5	4.2	−35.2

=== Pedro Sánchez ===
Polling firm/Commissioner	Fieldwork date	Sample size	Pedro Sánchez (PSOE)			
Polling firm/Commissioner	Fieldwork date	Sample size	check	X mark	Question	Net
Simple Lógica	1–15 Jun 2016	1,226	20.8	68.6	10.5	−47.8
Metroscopia/El País	7–8 Jun 2016	1,200	31.0	68.0	1.0	−37.0
Metroscopia/El País	31 May–1 Jun 2016	1,200	30.0	68.0	2.0	−38.0
Simple Lógica	2–10 May 2016	1,035	24.1	67.6	8.4	−43.5
Metroscopia/El País	26–28 Apr 2016	1,200	31.0	68.0	1.0	−37.0
Simple Lógica	4–12 Apr 2016	1,047	25.7	68.0	6.3	−42.3
Metroscopia	5–6 Apr 2016	1,200	36.0	62.0	2.0	−26.0
Metroscopia/El País	28–30 Mar 2016	1,200	39.0	59.0	2.0	−20.0
Metroscopia/El País	8–9 Mar 2016	1,200	46.0	52.0	2.0	−6.0
Simple Lógica	1–9 Mar 2016	1,206	35.4	59.9	4.7	−24.5
Simple Lógica	1–5 Feb 2016	1,048	27.2	66.3	6.5	−39.1
Metroscopia/El País	4 Feb 2016	600	50.0	47.0	3.0	+3.0
Metroscopia/El País	3–4 Feb 2016	1,000	50.0	46.0	4.0	+4.0
Metroscopia/El País	2 Feb 2016	?	44.0	52.0	4.0	−8.0
Metroscopia/El País	20–21 Jan 2016	1,200	31.0	64.0	5.0	−33.0
Metroscopia/El País	12–14 Jan 2016	1,200	37.0	57.0	6.0	−20.0
Simple Lógica	4–12 Jan 2016	1,050	23.2	69.1	7.7	−45.9

=== Pablo Iglesias ===
Polling firm/Commissioner	Fieldwork date	Sample size	Pablo Iglesias (Podemos)			
Polling firm/Commissioner	Fieldwork date	Sample size	check	X mark	Question	Net
Simple Lógica	1–15 Jun 2016	1,226	20.5	69.1	10.4	−48.6
Metroscopia/El País	7–8 Jun 2016	1,200	27.0	72.0	1.0	−45.0
Metroscopia/El País	31 May–1 Jun 2016	1,200	29.0	69.0	2.0	−40.0
Simple Lógica	2–10 May 2016	1,035	21.0	71.5	7.6	−50.5
Metroscopia/El País	26–28 Apr 2016	1,200	24.0	75.0	1.0	−51.0
Simple Lógica	4–12 Apr 2016	1,047	22.8	72.9	4.3	−50.1
Metroscopia	5–6 Apr 2016	1,200	26.0	72.0	2.0	−46.0
Metroscopia/El País	28–30 Mar 2016	1,200	30.0	68.0	2.0	−38.0
Metroscopia/El País	8–9 Mar 2016	1,200	32.0	67.0	1.0	−35.0
Simple Lógica	1–9 Mar 2016	1,206	30.8	65.5	3.7	−34.7
Simple Lógica	1–5 Feb 2016	1,048	27.5	66.7	5.9	−39.2
Metroscopia/El País	4 Feb 2016	600	36.0	61.0	3.0	−25.0
Metroscopia/El País	3–4 Feb 2016	1,000	39.0	59.0	2.0	−20.0
Metroscopia/El País	2 Feb 2016	?	33.0	64.0	3.0	−31.0
Metroscopia/El País	20–21 Jan 2016	1,200	37.0	59.0	4.0	−22.0
Metroscopia/El País	12–14 Jan 2016	1,200	39.0	56.0	5.0	−17.0
Simple Lógica	4–12 Jan 2016	1,050	34.0	59.0	7.0	−25.0

=== Albert Rivera ===
Polling firm/Commissioner	Fieldwork date	Sample size	Albert Rivera (C's)			
Polling firm/Commissioner	Fieldwork date	Sample size	check	X mark	Question	Net
Simple Lógica	1–15 Jun 2016	1,226	40.1	49.5	10.3	−9.4
Metroscopia/El País	7–8 Jun 2016	1,200	49.0	49.0	2.0	±0.0
Metroscopia/El País	31 May–1 Jun 2016	1,200	52.0	45.0	3.0	+7.0
Simple Lógica	2–10 May 2016	1,035	42.7	48.4	8.9	−5.7
Metroscopia/El País	26–28 Apr 2016	1,200	51.0	48.0	1.0	+3.0
Simple Lógica	4–12 Apr 2016	1,047	44.5	49.8	5.7	−5.3
Metroscopia	5–6 Apr 2016	1,200	56.0	42.0	2.0	+14.0
Metroscopia/El País	28–30 Mar 2016	1,200	56.0	37.0	7.0	+19.0
Metroscopia/El País	8–9 Mar 2016	1,200	65.0	33.0	2.0	+32.0
Simple Lógica	1–9 Mar 2016	1,206	52.8	42.9	4.3	+9.9
Simple Lógica	1–5 Feb 2016	1,048	51.1	42.0	6.9	+9.1
Metroscopia/El País	4 Feb 2016	600	65.0	32.0	3.0	+33.0
Metroscopia/El País	3–4 Feb 2016	1,000	63.0	35.0	2.0	+28.0
Metroscopia/El País	2 Feb 2016	?	62.0	35.0	3.0	+27.0
Metroscopia/El País	20–21 Jan 2016	1,200	56.0	38.0	6.0	+18.0
Metroscopia/El País	12–14 Jan 2016	1,200	53.0	41.0	6.0	+12.0
Simple Lógica	4–12 Jan 2016	1,050	47.4	45.5	7.1	+1.9

=== Alberto Garzón ===
Polling firm/Commissioner	Fieldwork date	Sample size	Alberto Garzón (IU)			
Polling firm/Commissioner	Fieldwork date	Sample size	check	X mark	Question	Net
Simple Lógica	1–15 Jun 2016	1,226	29.7	58.1	12.2	−28.4
Metroscopia/El País	31 May–1 Jun 2016	1,200	44.0	52.0	4.0	−8.0
Simple Lógica	2–10 May 2016	1,035	37.7	50.4	11.9	−12.7
Metroscopia/El País	26–28 Apr 2016	1,200	47.0	48.0	5.0	−1.0
Simple Lógica	4–12 Apr 2016	1,047	37.3	52.4	10.3	−15.1
Metroscopia	5–6 Apr 2016	1,200	51.0	45.0	4.0	+6.0
Metroscopia/El País	28–30 Mar 2016	1,200	55.0	42.0	3.0	+13.0
Metroscopia/El País	8–9 Mar 2016	1,200	55.0	41.0	4.0	+14.0
Simple Lógica	1–9 Mar 2016	1,206	46.7	46.2	7.1	+0.5
Simple Lógica	1–5 Feb 2016	1,048	37.3	50.2	12.5	−12.9
Metroscopia/El País	3–4 Feb 2016	1,000	55.0	38.0	7.0	+17.0
Metroscopia/El País	12–14 Jan 2016	1,200	49.0	43.0	8.0	+6.0
Simple Lógica	4–12 Jan 2016	1,050	39.9	47.7	12.4	−7.8
