= Institute of Youth =

Autonomous agency of the Government of Spain

- Instituto de la Juventud
- INJUVE logo

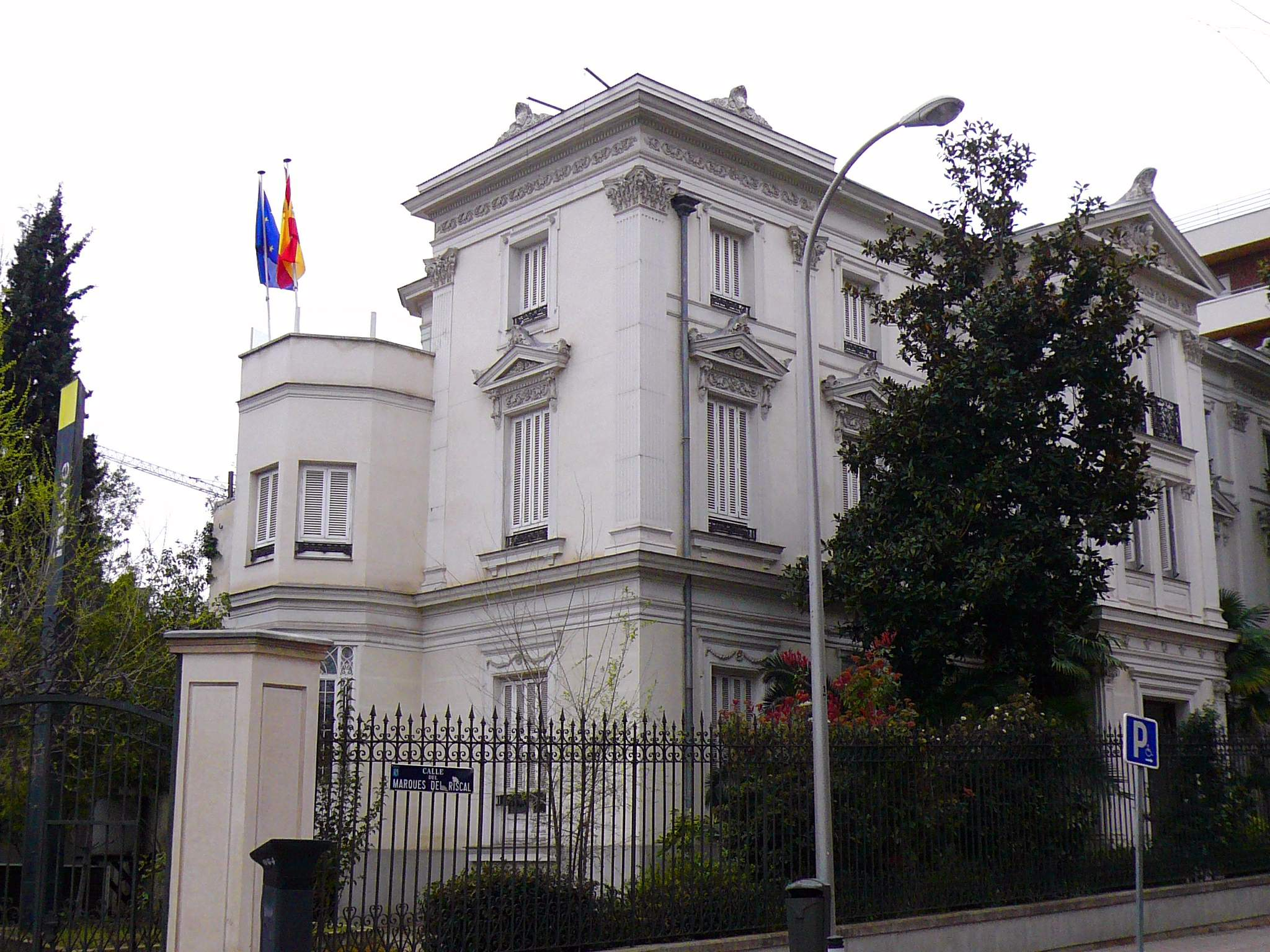
- INJUVE headquarters in Madrid

Agency overview
- Formed: 16 November 1961; 64 years ago
- Jurisdiction: Spanish government
- Headquarters: Madrid, Spain
- Employees: 1,422 (2017)
- Annual budget: € 55 million (2023)
- Agency executives: Rubén Pérez Correa, Secretary of State for Youth and Children; Margarita Guerrero Calderón, Director-General
- Website: www.injuve.es

The Institute of Youth (INJUVE) is an autonomous agency of the Government of Spain responsible for promoting youth associations and collaboration for their advancement; the development and coordination of an information and communication system for youth; the promotion of relations and international cooperation in youth affairs; as well as the cultural promotion of youth and knowledge of other cultural realities.

Likewise, it is responsible for training youth in the values of solidarity and equality; the development of the social and political conditions necessary for the emancipation of young people; the promotion of actions that result in sustainable development and healthy lifestyle habits of youth; and, in general, the execution of the Health Ministry's policies regarding youth.

The Institute, integrated in the Ministry of Youth and Children, through the Secretariat of State for Youth and Children, is headed by a Director-General appointed by the Monarch, on the advice of the Minister of Youth and Children and after hearing the Council of Ministers. The current director-general is Margarita Guerrero Calderón.

== History ==
The INJUVE was created in November 1961 and it was part of the National Delegation for Youth of the General Secretariat of the Movement. Years later, in May 1977, it was transferred to the Office of the Prime Minister. Months later, in September, the Institute was transferred to the Ministry of Culture. A decade later, in July 1988, the functions on youth were transferred to the Ministry of Social Affairs assuming this department the direction of the INJUVE, and the same happened in 1996 when the Ministry merged with the Ministry of Labour.

In 2008, the socialist government created the Ministry of Equality which assumed all the powers relating youth, including the Institute. However, due to the 2008 financial crisis, the government suppressed the department in late 2010 merging it with the Ministry of Health. Since then, youth functions has been the responsibility of these ministerial departments.

== Organization chart ==
In accordance with its Statute, the Agency is organized as follows:

The Institute of Youth is fully integrated in the Department of Health, being the President of the agency the Health Minister itself. The President duties are related to exercise the superior direction of the agency, to approve the general plans of actions and to chair the Governing Council. The Governing Council is a collective body integrated by the Minister of Health which chairs it, the Director-General of the Institute which acts as Deputy Chair and representatives from the INJUVE and Spanish Youth Council. The Governing Council also works through its Permanent Committee, a small representation of the Council chaired by the Director-General.

However, the chief executive of the agency is the Director-General. The DG, appointed by the Minister, is responsible for planning, directing, controlling and supervising the agency activity to ensure the fulfilment of its responsibilities. From the director-general depends two departments with the rank of deputy directorates-general; the General Secretariat and the Deputy Directorate-General for Internal and External Cooperation.

The Secretary-General is the second-in-command to the Director-General and it is responsible for elaborating the budget draft as well as controlling the economic and budgetary management; the management of the agency's human resources; the technical and legal assistance to the Institute and the coordination of other domestic services of the Agency. The Deputy Directorate-General for Internal and External Cooperation is responsible for promoting the agency programs as well as manage the public aids that the agency grants. The Agency also possesses a Programs Division, which elaborates and organize the agency programs and assists the Director-General on its duties as Deputy Chair of the Governing Council.

The Director-General is also the head responsible for the Euro-Latin American Youth Center (CEULAJ), the center which acts as a meeting point for youth associations from Spain, Europe and Latin America. It has its headquarters in Mollina, Spain.

== List of directors-general ==
The Office of Director-General was created in 1985. Prior to this, it existed the Office of Director of the Institute, which was headed by the Director-General for Youth first and by the Director-General for Youth and Socio-Cultural Promotion later, a Culture Ministry's officials.

- José María Riera Mercader (1985–1988)
- Magdy Martínez Solimán (1988–1993)
- Rosa María Escapa Garrachón (1993–1996)
- Ricardo Tarno (1996–1998)
- Antonio Basagoiti Pastor (1998–1999)
- Elena Azpiroz Villar (1999–2004)
- Leire Iglesias Salgado (2004–2008)
- Gabriel Alconchel Morales (2008–2012)
- Rubén Urosa Sánchez (2012–2016)
- Javier Dorado Soto (2016–2018)
- Ruth Carrasco Ruiz (2018–2020)
- María Teresa Pérez (2020–)
