= José Luis Centella =

Spanish Communist politician (born 1958)

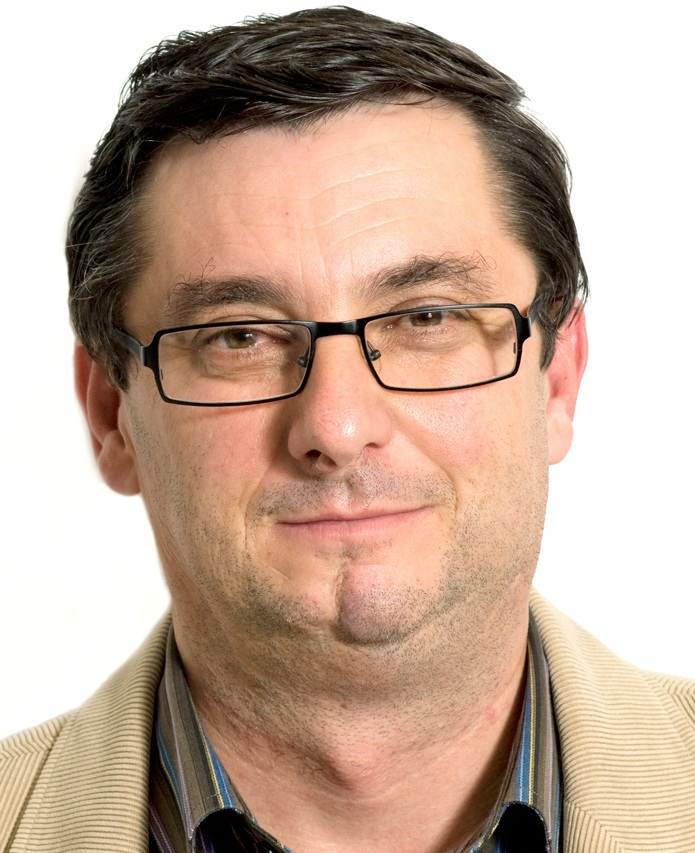
Centella in 2011

José Luis Centella Gómez (born 1958) is a Communist Party of Spain (PCE) politician. He served in the Congress of Deputies from 1995 to 2004 and 2011 to 2015. He was his party's secretary general from 2009 to 2018, subsequently becoming its president.

== Biography ==
Born in Córdoba, Centella became a teacher and was elected to the town council in Benalmádena in 1987. In 1995, he became a member of the Congress of Deputies representing Málaga, succeeding Antonio Romero Ruiz who was running for mayor. In October 1996, he sent 1,373 pesetas (less than €10) to prime minister José María Aznar in protest at government spending for the province of Málaga; the amount was what Centella estimated to be the government's spend per person in the province.

During his time on congressional commissions, Centella spoke on issues such as the olive and fishing industries, recovering the works of Pablo Picasso and Cuba–Spain relations. A critic of Jesús Gil, the right-wing mayor of Marbella, he successfully campaigned for an audit of Gil's city council, as well as an investigation into the finances of Seville Expo '92. He succeeded Felipe Alcaraz as secretary general of the Communist Party of Andalusia in 2002, and lost his seat in congress in the 2004 election. In November 2009, he succeeded Francisco Frutos as secretary general of the PCE, by unanimous vote.

Centella returned to the Congress of Deputies in the 2011 election, as the leader of the United Left (UI) in the Seville constituency. He did not stand for re-election in 2015, and in 2018 he was succeeded as secretary general of the PCE by Enrique Santiago, moving into the party's new office of president.
