= Enrique Santiago =

Spanish politician (born 1964)

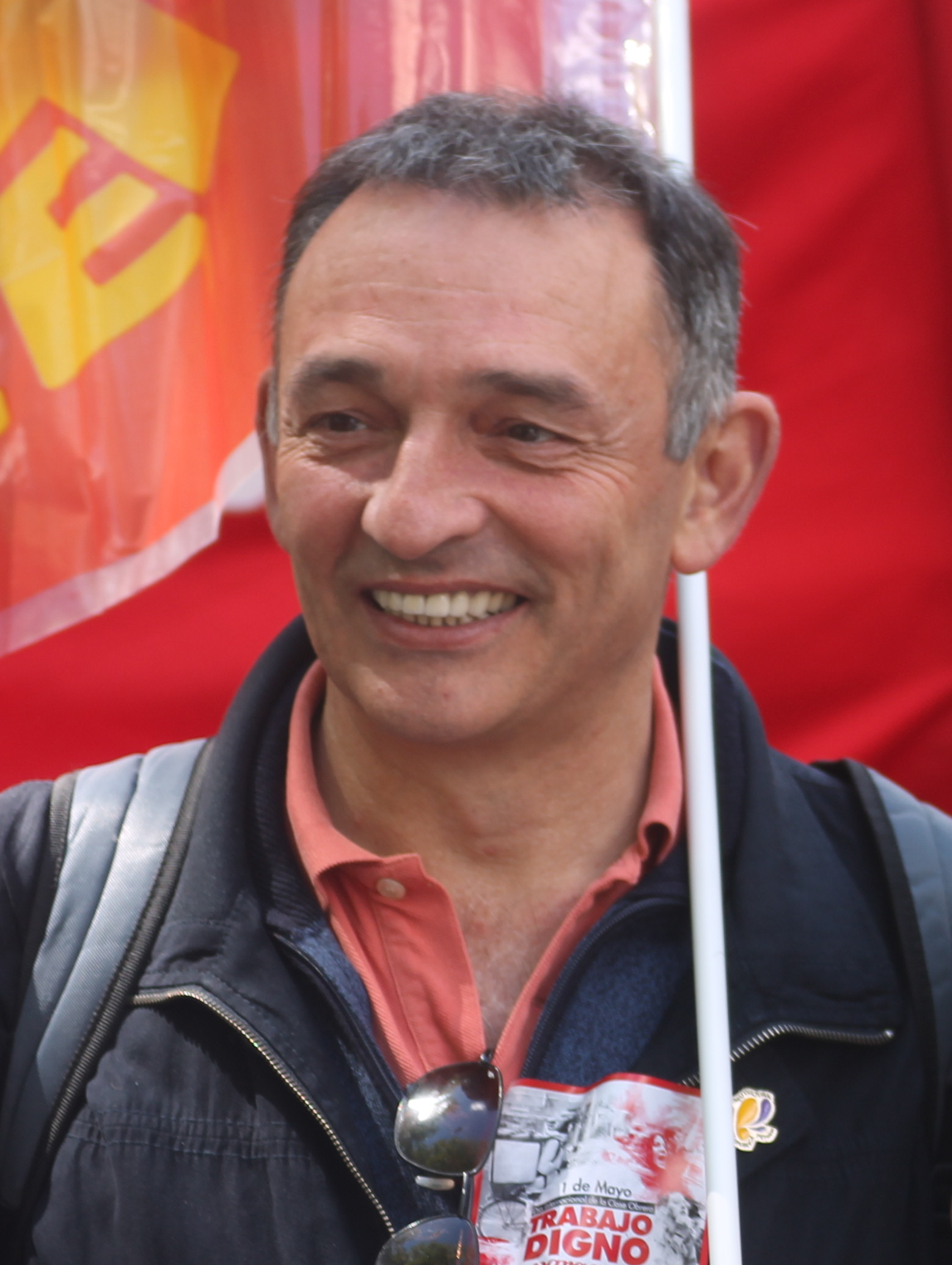
- Santiago in the 2018 May Day

Secretary-General of the Communist Party of Spain
- Incumbent
- Assumed office 8 April 2018
- Preceded by: José Luis Centella

State Secretary for the 2030 Agenda
- In office 31 March 2021 – 27 July 2022
- Monarch: Felipe VI
- Prime Minister: Pedro Sánchez
- Preceded by: Ione Belarra
- Succeeded by: Lilith Verstrynge

Member of the Congress of Deputies
- Incumbent
- Assumed office 21 May 2019
- Constituency: Madrid

Personal details
- Born: 18 July 1964 (age 62) Madrid, Spain
- Party: Communist Party of Spain (since 1980); United Left (since 1986)
- Education: Complutense University
- Occupation: Lawyer, politician, human rights activist

Enrique Fernando Santiago Romero (born 1964) is a Spanish lawyer and politician who has been secretary-general of the Communist Party of Spain (PCE) since April 2018. He has been a member of the Congress of Deputies for Madrid since 2019.

== Biography ==
Born on 18 July 1964 in Madrid, he affiliated to the Communist Party of Spain (PCE) in 1980. He earned a Licentiate degree in Law at the Complutense University of Madrid. A member of United Left (IU) since its beginnings as political alliance in 1986, he was the leader of the Communist Youth Union of Spain from 1991 to 1993. He has also chaired the Spanish Commission for Refugees (CEAR).

He has worked as a lawyer, specialized in human rights and cases of trans-national justice, and took a role as IU representative in the public prosecution against Argentine and Chilean regimes, later filing a detention request against Chilean dictator Augusto Pinochet. He also worked as a lawyer for the family of José Couso, cameraman killed in Baghdad in 2003 by US fire, participating in the particular accusation that presented a criminal inquiry before the Audiencia Nacional, accusing the US military personnel deemed responsible for the Couso's death.

The Central Committee of the PCE elected Santiago as the new Secretary-General of the party on 8 April 2018, replacing José Luis Centella.

He was IU's final choice to lead the party for the 2019 Congress of Deputies election in the constituency of Madrid (IU leader Alberto Garzón opted to stand as candidate in Málaga), integrating 3rd in the list of the Unidas Podemos coalition. He was elected, and became a member of the 13th term of the Lower House.

Party political offices
Preceded by José Luis Centella	Secretary-General of the Communist Party of Spain; Since April 2018	Succeeded by Incumbent
