= Sira Rego =

Spanish politician (born 1973)

The Most Excellent Sira Rego
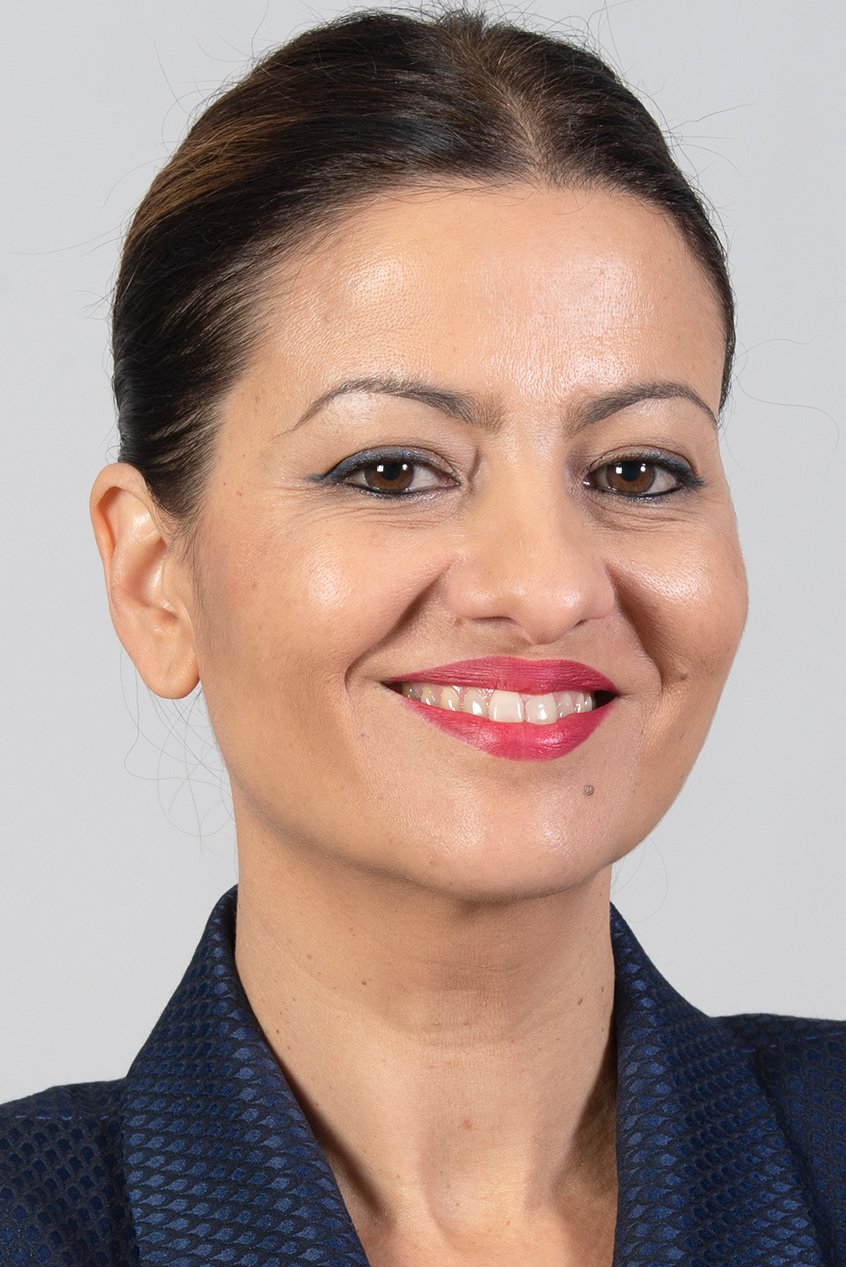
- Official portrait, 2023

Minister of Youth and Children
- Incumbent
- Assumed office 21 November 2023
- Monarch: Felipe VI
- Prime Minister: Pedro Sánchez
- Preceded by: Office established

Member of the European Parliament
- In office 2 July 2019 – 20 November 2023
- Succeeded by: Patricia Caro
- Constituency: Spain

Member of the Rivas-Vaciamadrid City Council
- In office 13 June 2007 – 15 June 2019

Personal details
- Born: Sira Abed Rego; 20 November 1973 (age 52) Valencia, Spain
- Party: Communist Party of Spain; United Left
- Other political affiliations: Workers' Commissions; Ecologists in Action

Sira Abed Rego (Spanish pronunciation: [ˈsiɾa ˈreɣo]; born 20 November 1973) is a Spanish dietitian and politician affiliated with United Left (IU) who has been serving as Minister of Youth and Children in the Government of Spain since 2023. Rego was a Member of the European Parliament between 2019 and 2023.

== Career ==
As an MEP she was nominated as European United Left–Nordic Green Left's candidate for President of the European Parliament, placing fourth in the election held on 3 July 2019.

On 15 September 2022, she was one of 16 MEPs who voted against condemning President Daniel Ortega of Nicaragua for alleged human rights violations, in particular the arrest of Bishop Rolando Álvarez.

On 21 November 2023, she was appointed Minister of Youth and Children in the Government of Spain.

In 2024, Rego led a bid for the leadership of IU, but lost to Antonio Maíllo.

== Political views ==
Rego has been committed to the fight against violence against women in all areas and throughout the world.

In the wake of the Hamas attack on Israel on 7 October 2023, Rego posted a post in favour of Palestinian right to resist.

In early February 2026, Rego went in criticizing social media, suggesting that Spain should limit or even prohibit access to X, describing the platform's "uncensored debate space" as "anti‑democratic" and likening such measures to restrictions found in authoritarian states.

== Personal life ==
Born in Valencia to a Spanish mother and a Palestinian father, Rego spent part of her early life in 'Anata town in State of Palestine. Her father lives with Rego's brother in the West Bank.
