= Alberto Garzón =

Spanish former politician and economist (born 1985)

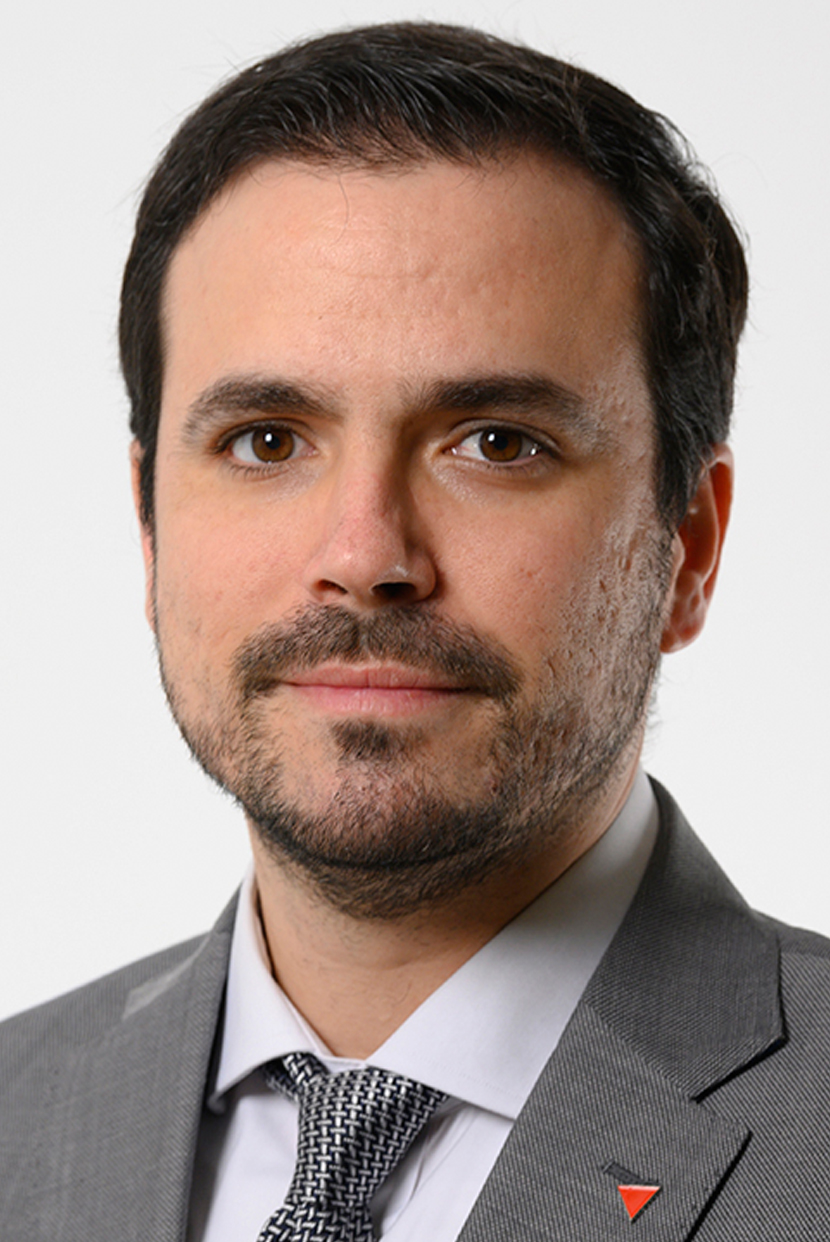
- Official photo (2020)

Minister of Consumer Affairs
- In office 13 January 2020 – 21 November 2023
- Monarch: Felipe VI
- Prime Minister: Pedro Sánchez
- Preceded by: María Luisa Carcedo (Health, Consumer Affairs and Social Welfare); María Jesús Montero (Finance)
- Succeeded by: Pablo Bustinduy (Social Rights, Consumer Affairs and 2030 Agenda)

General Coordinator of United Left
- In office 4 June 2016 – 17 November 2023
- Preceded by: Cayo Lara
- Succeeded by: Antonio Maíllo

Secretary for Constitutional Process of United Left
- In office 28 June 2014 – 4 July 2016
- Preceded by: Enrique Santiago
- Succeeded by: Esther López Barceló

Secretary for Global Economic Policy of United Left
- In office 16 December 2012 – 28 June 2014
- Preceded by: José Antonio García Rubio
- Succeeded by: José Antonio García Rubio

Member of the Congress of Deputies
- In office 13 December 2011 – 17 August 2023
- Constituency: Málaga (2011–2016); Madrid (2016–2019); Málaga (2019–2023)

Personal details
- Born: Alberto Carlos Garzón Espinosa; 9 October 1985 (age 41) Logroño, Spain
- Party: Communist Party of Spain (since 2003); United Left (since 2003)
- Spouse: Anna Ruiz (m. 2017)
- Children: 3
- Education: University of Malaga

Alberto Carlos Garzón Espinosa (Spanish pronunciation: [alˈβeɾto ˈkaɾlos ɣaɾˈθon espiˈnosa]; born 9 October 1985) is a Spanish former politician and economist. He was the Minister of Consumer Affairs from 2020 to 2023. He has been a member of the Communist Party of Spain (PCE) and United Left (Izquierda Unida, IU) since 2003. In the 2011 general election, he was elected as an MP within that coalition. He has been the Secretary of Constituent Process in IU from 2014 to 2016, and in 2015, he was elected as an IU candidate for that year's general election. He is a researcher at Pablo de Olavide University in Seville.

== Biography ==
=== Family origins and youth ===
He is the son of Alberto Garzón Blanco, a teacher of Geography and History in Málaga, and Isabel Espinosa Casares, a pharmacist from Cenicero, La Rioja. The two met on a summer trip in Rincón de la Victoria. He spent his early years in Logroño, where he was born. When he was three, the family moved to the Sevilian town of Marchena, where his father had obtained a job as a professor.

In 1994, the family returned to Rincón de la Victoria. Garzón attended the Manuel Laza Palacios elementary school and the Ben Al Jatib secondary school. He liked football and attempted, unsuccessfully, to make his way into Sports Club Rincón.

=== University stage ===
Garzón initially studied Administration and Management of Corporations at the Faculty of Economic and Business Sciences of the University of Málaga, but the following year, he changed to Economics. When he was 18 years old, he joined United Left The Greens-Andalucía.

In 2004, he participated in the foundation of Students for a Critical Economy, an association of which he was president until 2008, and that was in the same line as the Post-autistic economics movement born in France a few years earlier. The purpose of that group was academic and militant, since it denounced "the unique thinking and the intellectual emptiness that reigns in the teaching of economics" at the same time as it participated in social movements such like the Social Forum Another Malaga of 2004. The association would incorporate first as "Left-wing Students", a university association of a left-wing and anticapitalist nature, and later, in the platform of "Critical Students", a union of many progressive groups. Criticism Economy Malaga stood in the students' elections, obtaining 64% of the votes in 2008.

IU listed Garzón fifth on their candidate list for the 2007 Spanish local elections.

Garzón later earned his Master's in International Economy and Development at the School of Business & Economic Sciences at the Complutense University of Madrid. It was here that Garzón Sampedro, who Garzón would later publicly thank for being the basis of his school of thought. Other politicians from UL have enrolled within the university's School of Business & Economic Sciences, including Eddy Sánchez, as well as several economic advisors to Unidos Podemos.

=== Member of the Congress of Deputies ===
Garzón was first elected as a Deputy in the Spanish Parliament on the IU list for Málaga, following the 2011 Spanish general election. He was the youngest member of the House of Deputies during that session.

In January 2013, he was elected as a member of IU's Federal Executive Committee.

=== Minister of Consumer Affairs ===
Garzón was appointed Minister of Consumer Affairs on 13 January 2020.

In October 2021, Garzón announced that the ministry would ban the advertising of several categories of junk food to children under 16. Such advertising would be forbidden on television, on the radio, online, in movie theaters, and in newspapers. Affected foods include candy, energy bars, cookies, cake, juice, energy drinks, and ice cream. The ban is to take effect during 2022. In 2022 Garzón triggered controversy by criticizing factory farming, emphasizing its environmental damage and poor-quality meat exports. He praised traditional grazing as more sustainable but faced backlash from the meat industry, opposition politicians, and senior members of the ruling Socialist Workers party. Garzón reiterated his concerns on pollution and emissions from factory farming and excessive meat consumption. Spain's livestock industry depends on exports, and his comments received a strong negative reaction from various quarters. A report linked intensive pork farming to an environmental disaster in Spain, which led to the deaths of thousands of fish.
