= Ministry of Youth and Children =

Government ministry of Spain

- Ministerio de Juventud e Infancia

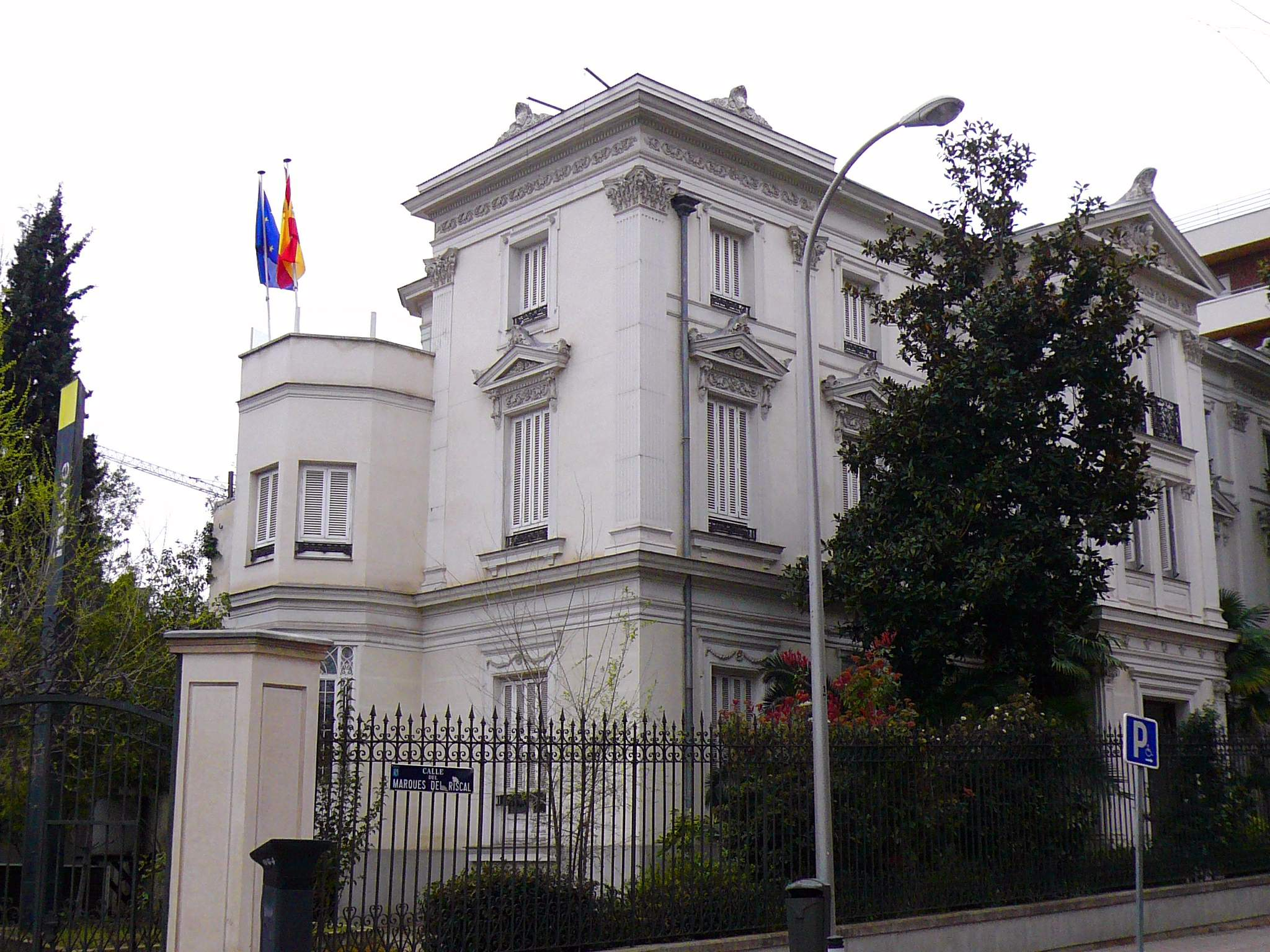
- Palace of the Marquess of Eliseda, Madrid

Agency overview
- Formed: November 21, 2023; 2 years ago
- Preceding agency: Ministry of Social Rights and 2030 Agenda (youth and children)
- Type: Ministry
- Jurisdiction: Government of Spain
- Minister responsible: Sira Rego, Minister
- Agency executives: Rubén Pérez Correa, Secretary of State; Rafael Escudero Alday, Under-Secretary
- Website: www.juventudeinfancia.gob.es

The Ministry of Youth and Children (Spanish: Ministerio de Juventud e Infancia, MIJUI) is a ministerial department in the Government of Spain responsible for designing and implementing the government policy on matters of youth and protection of minors.

The department was created as part of the Sánchez III Government as a split from the Ministry of Social Rights and 2030 Agenda. It also assumed some of its powers from the High Commissioner for the Fight against Child Poverty that existed in the Office of the Prime Minister from 2018 to 2023.

The department was headquartered in the Casa Sindical (Spanish: Trade Unions House) in Madrid until 14 March 2025. Since then, its headquarters have been located in the Palace of the Marquess of Eliseda, an early 20th-century building that originally housed the Falange and, later, the Institute of Youth.

It is headed by Sira Rego.

== Structure ==
Organizational chart of the Spanish Ministry of Youth and Children, February 2024

The Ministry is structured as follows:

- The Secretariat of State for Youth and Children
  - The Directorate-General for Children and Adolescents Rights
    - The Deputy Directorate-General for the Promotion of Children and Adolescents Rights
    - The Deputy Directorate-General for Children and Adolescents Programs
- The Undersecretariat
  - The Technical General Secretariat
    - The Deputy Technical General Secretariat
    - The Deputy Directorate-General for Administrative Appeals, International Relations and Publications
  - The Deputy Directorate-General for Personnel, Inspection of Services and Coordination
  - The Deputy Directorate-General for Economic Management, Budget Office and General Affairs
  - The Division for Information and Communications Technologies

=== Agencies ===
- Institute of Youth (INJUVE)

== Budget ==
In millions of euros (€)
1. Youth policy 54.3 (26.7%)
2. Children policy 41.4 (20.4%)
3. Digital skills 97 (47.8%)
4. Administration and general services 10.4 (5.12%)

For fiscal year 2023, extended to 2026, the Ministry of Youth and Children has a consolidated budget of €203.1 million. Of this amount, €148.8 million are directly managed by the ministry's central services while €54.3 million are managed by its agencies.

The budget can be divided into four main areas:

1. Youth policy (232A), which finances youth services.
2. Children policy (Program 231G), which funds children services.
3. Digital skills (46SA), aimed at promoting digital skills in children and adolescents within the framework of the National Digital Skills Plan.
4. Administration and general services (232N), covering the Ministry’s central services and administrative structure.

In addition, Programme 000X (“Internal Transfers and Disbursements”) is excluded from the analysis, as it consists of transfers between public sector entities and would otherwise lead to double counting and distort the overall budget.

=== Audit ===
The Ministry's accounts, as well as those of its agencies, are internally audited by the Office of the Comptroller General of the State (IGAE), through a Delegated Comptroller's Office within the Department itself. Externally, the Court of Auditors is responsible for auditing expenditures.

Likewise, the Congress of Deputies and the Senate Committees on Youth and Children, exercise political control over the accounts.

== List of officeholders ==
Office name:

- Ministry of Youth and Children (2023–present)

Portrait	Name (Birth–Death)	Term of office			Party	Government	Prime Minister (Tenure)	Ref.
Portrait	Name (Birth–Death)	Took office	Left office	Duration	Party	Government	Prime Minister (Tenure)	Ref.
	Sira Rego (born 1973)	21 November 2023	Incumbent	2 years and 261 days	IU, PCE	Sánchez III	Pedro Sánchez (2018–present)	
