= Antonio Maíllo =

Spanish politician (born 1966)

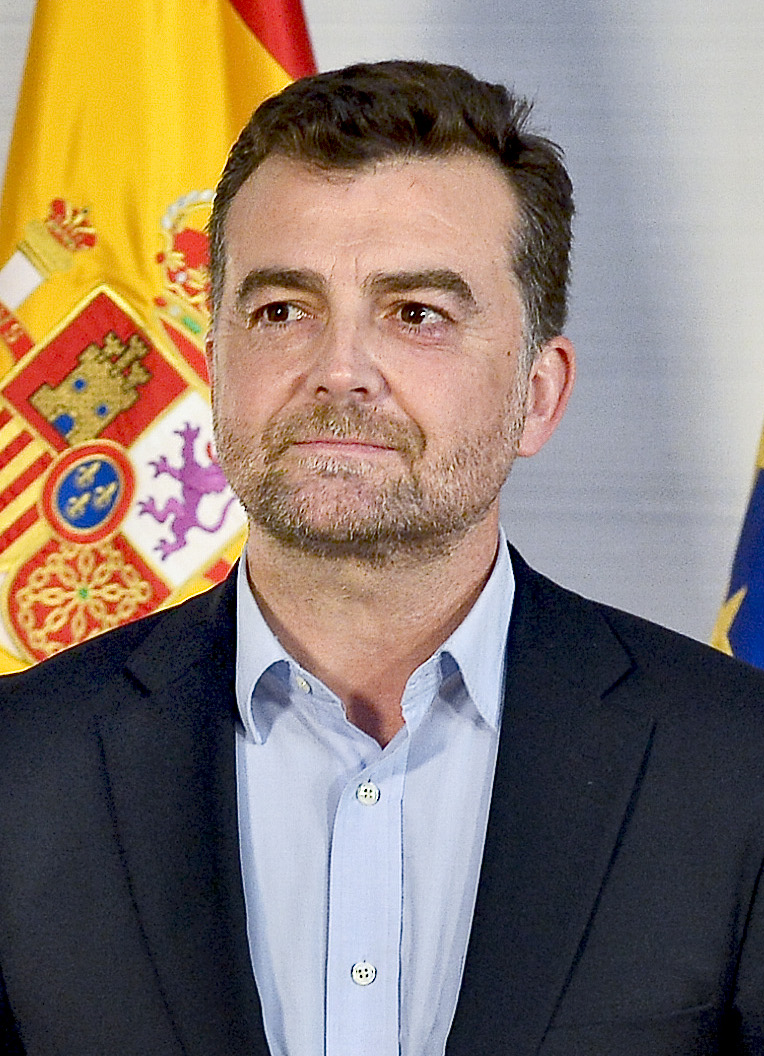
Maíllo in 2015

Antonio Maíllo Cañadas (born 2 November 1966) is a Spanish politician of the Communist Party of Spain (PCE). From 2013 to 2019 he was the general coordinator of United Left/The Greens–Assembly for Andalusia (IULV–CA) and he was a deputy in the Parliament of Andalusia from 2015 to 2019, serving as spokesman of the IULV–CA and Adelante Andalucía groups. In 2024, after a career break due to cancer, he became general co-ordinator of the United Left (IU). He was elected to the Parliament of Andalusia in 2026, as the lead candiadte of Por Andalucía.

== Early and personal life ==
Maíllo was born in Lucena, Córdoba, to a religious family dedicated to saddlemaking and later to the local timber industry. While his family wanted him to become a lawyer, he instead studied Classics at the University of Seville, developing a lifelong passion with Latin and Ancient Greek. He also began his political activism, opposing Spain's accession to NATO in 1986. After graduating, he became a Latin teacher at schools in Sanlúcar de Barrameda in the Province of Cádiz, and Aracena in the Province of Huelva. Openly gay, Maíllo says that he never received homophobic abuse from students, even when handing out punishments.

== Political career ==
=== 2013–2019 ===
In June 2013, Maíllo was elected general coordinator of the United Left/The Greens–Assembly for Andalusia (IULV–CA), with a record 83% of the votes. He was given an award by the city of Baeza in September 2014 for his work for LGBT rights. He was the first openly gay candidate for President of the Regional Government of Andalusia when he ran in the 2015 Andalusian regional election.

In the election, the United Left (IU) had its worst Andalusian result in history, falling from twelve seats to five amidst the rise of a new party on the left, Podemos. For the 2018 Andalusian regional election, his group formed Adelante Andalucía alongside Podemos, with Podemos leader Teresa Rodríguez the presidential candidate and himself the vice-presidential candidate. This candidacy took 17 seats, three fewer than its parts had taken in 2015. In June 2019, he left his parliamentary seat and party coordinator role, and returned to teaching Latin.

Maíllo was hospitalised with a digestive haemorrhage on the campaign trail in December 2015 and was unable to work for three months. He was diagnosed with cancer, which was a reason for him leaving politics in 2019. In February 2021, he announced that he was free of cancer.

=== 2024–present ===
In 2024, Maíllo returned to politics and ran for general co-ordinator of the IU. He took the majority of votes in the primary and was confirmed in May at the party's 13th federal congress, with 79% of members in favour and a 19% abstention. In his speech, he said that IU would remain part of Sumar and warned against movements that put too much power in their leaders, instead committing to keeping IU as a federation of allied parties.

In November 2025, Maíllo was named as Por Andalucía's lead candidate for the 2026 Andalusian regional election. His party won five seats, the same as in the previous election, and he was their only one elected in the Seville constituency. He expressed disappointment with the result.
