= Málaga (Congress of Deputies constituency) =

Electoral constituency in Spain

Coordinates: 36°43′N 4°25′W

- Congress of Deputies; Electoral constituency
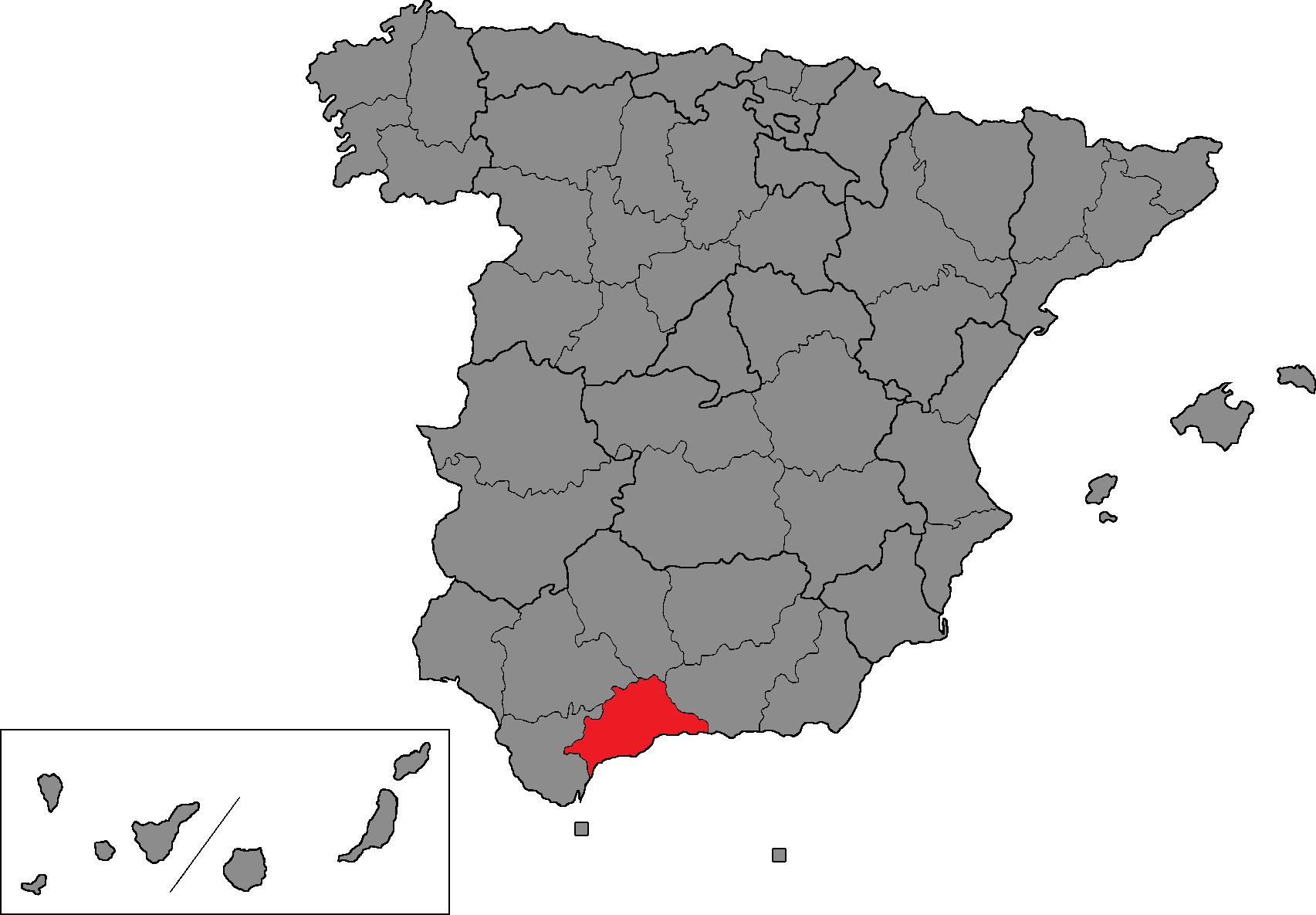
- Location of Málaga within Spain
- Province: Málaga
- Autonomous community: Andalusia
- Population: ▲1,773,136 (2024)
- Electorate: ▲1,239,846 (2023)
- Major settlements: Málaga, Marbella, Vélez-Málaga, Mijas, Fuengirola, Torremolinos, Benalmádena, Estepona

Current constituency
- Created: 1977
- Seats: 8 (1977–1986); 9 (1986–1989); 10 (1989–2015); 11 (2015–present)
- Members: PP (5); PSOE (3); Vox (2); Sumar (1)

Málaga is one of the 52 constituencies represented in the Congress of Deputies, the lower chamber of the Spanish parliament, the Cortes Generales. The constituency (whose boundaries correspond to those of the homonymous province) currently elects 11 deputies. The electoral system uses the D'Hondt method and closed-list proportional voting, with a minimum threshold of three percent.

== Electoral system ==
The constituency was created as per the Political Reform Law and was first contested in the 1977 general election. The Law provided for the provinces of Spain to be established as multi-member districts in the Congress of Deputies, with this regulation being maintained under the Spanish Constitution of 1978. Additionally, the Constitution requires for any modification of the provincial limits to be approved under an organic law, needing an absolute majority in the Cortes Generales.

Voting is based on universal suffrage, comprising all Spanish nationals over 18 years of age with full political rights, provided that they have not been deprived of the right to vote by a final sentence. The only exception was in 1977, when this was limited to nationals over 21 years of age and in full enjoyment of their political and civil rights. Amendments in 2011 required non-resident citizens to apply for voting, a system known as "begged" voting (Spanish: Voto rogado). which was abolished in 2022. Further, amendments in 2018 granted the right to vote to those legally incapacitated. The Congress of Deputies has a minimum of 300 and a maximum of 400 seats, with electoral provisions fixing its size at 350. Of these, 348 are elected in 50 multi-member constituencies corresponding to the provinces of Spain—each of which is assigned an initial minimum of two seats and the remaining 248 distributed in proportion to population—using the D'Hondt method and closed-list proportional voting, with a three percent-threshold of valid votes (including blank ballots) in each constituency. The remaining two seats are allocated to Ceuta and Melilla as single-member districts elected by plurality voting. The use of this electoral method may result in a higher effective threshold depending on district magnitude and vote distribution. The law does not provide for by-elections to fill vacant seats; instead, any vacancies arising after the proclamation of candidates and during the legislative term are filled by the next candidates on the party lists or, when required, by designated substitutes.

The electoral law allows for parties and federations registered in the interior ministry, alliances and groupings of electors to present lists of candidates. Parties and federations intending to form an alliance are required to inform the relevant electoral commission within 10 days of the election call—15 before 1985—whereas groupings of electors need to secure the signature of at least one percent of the electorate in the constituencies for which they seek election—one permille of the electorate, with a compulsory minimum of 500 signatures, until 1985—disallowing electors from signing for more than one list. Also since 2011, parties, federations or alliances that have not obtained a mandate in either chamber of the Cortes at the preceding election are required to secure the signature of at least 0.1 percent of electors in the aforementioned constituencies. Amendments in 2007 required a balanced composition of men and women in the electoral lists, so that candidates of either sex made up at least 40 percent of the total composition; further amendments in 2024 required the use of a zipper system.

== Deputies ==
Deputies 1977–present
Key to parties PCE IU IULV–CA Unidas Podemos Podemos Sumar PA PSOE Cs UCD PP CP AP Vox
Legislature	Election	Distribution
Constituent	1977	1 / 4 / 3
1st	1979	1 / 1 / 3 / 3
2nd	1982	6 / 2
3rd	1986	1 / 6 / 2
4th	1989	1 / 7 / 2
5th	1993	1 / 6 / 3
6th	1996	1 / 5 / 4
7th	2000	1 / 4 / 5
8th	2004	6 / 4
9th	2008	5 / 5
10th	2011	1 / 3 / 6
11th	2015	2 / 3 / 2 / 4
12th	2016	2 / 3 / 2 / 4
13th	2019 (Apr)	2 / 4 / 2 / 2 / 1
14th	2019 (Nov)	1 / 4 / 1 / 3 / 2
15th	2023	1 / 3 / 5 / 2

== General elections ==
=== 2026 ===
Summary of the 29 November 2026 Congress of Deputies election results in Málaga
Parties and alliances	Popular vote			Seats	
Parties and alliances	Votes	%	±pp	Total	+/−
People's Party (PP)					
Spanish Socialist Workers' Party (PSOE)					
Vox (Vox)					
Andalusian Broad Front (FA)^{1}			n/a		
We Can (Podemos)^{1}			n/a		
Animalist Party with the Environment (PACMA)					
Workers' Front (FO)					
Forward Andalusia (Adelante Andalucía)			New		
The Party is Over (SALF)			New		
Malagenian Alternative (29)			New		
Communist Party of the Workers of Spain (PCTE)			New		
Blank ballots					
Total				11	±0
Valid votes					
Invalid votes					
Votes cast / turnout					
Abstentions					
Registered voters	1,292,972				
Sources
Footnotes: ^{1} Within the Unite Andalusia alliance in the 2023 election.

=== 2023 ===
Summary of the 23 July 2023 Congress of Deputies election results in Málaga
Parties and alliances	Popular vote			Seats	
Parties and alliances	Votes	%	±pp	Total	+/−
People's Party (PP)	302,000	38.31	+16.75	5	+2
Spanish Socialist Workers' Party (PSOE)	239,172	30.34	+0.36	3	–1
Vox (Vox)	129,758	16.46	–4.99	2	±0
Unite Andalusia (Sumar)^{1}	96,652	12.26	–2.52	1	±0
Animalist Party with the Environment (PACMA)^{2}	8,487	1.08	–0.39	0	±0
Workers' Front (FO)	1,662	0.21	New	0	±0
For a Fairer World (PUM+J)	1,519	0.19	+0.027	0	±0
Zero Cuts (Recortes Cero)	888	0.11	–0.06	0	±0
Walking Together (CJ)	691	0.09	New	0	±0
Citizens–Party of the Citizenry (Cs)	n/a	n/a	–8.85	0	–1
Blank ballots	7,509	0.95	–0.15		
Total	788,338			11	±0
Valid votes	788,338	98.72	+0.04		
Invalid votes	10,219	1.28	–0.04		
Votes cast / turnout	798,557	64.41	+0.39		
Abstentions	441,289	35.59	–0.39		
Registered voters	1,239,846				
Sources
Footnotes: ^{1} Unite Andalusia results are compared to the combined totals of United We Can and More Country–Andalusia in the November 2019 election.; ^{2} Animalist Party with the Environment results are compared to Animalist Party Against Mistreatment of Animals totals in the November 2019 election.

=== November 2019 ===
Summary of the 10 November 2019 Congress of Deputies election results in Málaga
Parties and alliances	Popular vote			Seats	
Parties and alliances	Votes	%	±pp	Total	+/−
Spanish Socialist Workers' Party (PSOE)	226,831	29.98	–0.86	4	±0
People's Party (PP)	163,177	21.56	+3.86	3	+1
Vox (Vox)	162,280	21.45	+7.47	2	+1
United We Can (Podemos–IULV–CA)	97,801	12.92	–1.59	1	–1
Citizens–Party of the Citizenry (Cs)	66,995	8.85	–10.65	1	–1
More Country–Andalusia (Más País–Andalucía)	14,112	1.86	New	0	±0
Animalist Party Against Mistreatment of Animals (PACMA)	11,089	1.47	–0.38	0	±0
Andalusia by Herself (AxSí)	1,686	0.22	+0.02	0	±0
Spanish Communist Workers' Party (PCOE)	1,265	0.17	New	0	±0
Zero Cuts–Green Group (Recortes Cero–GV)	1,261	0.17	–0.05	0	±0
For a Fairer World (PUM+J)	904	0.12	–0.01	0	±0
Communist Party of the Andalusian People (PCPA)	581	0.08	–0.02	0	±0
Communist Party of the Workers of Spain (PCTE)	381	0.05	–0.03	0	±0
Blank ballots	8,358	1.10	+0.21		
Total	756,721			11	±0
Valid votes	756,721	98.68	–0.16		
Invalid votes	10,098	1.32	+0.16		
Votes cast / turnout	766,819	64.02	–5.32		
Abstentions	430,869	35.98	+5.32		
Registered voters	1,197,688				

=== April 2019 ===
Summary of the 28 April 2019 Congress of Deputies election results in Málaga
Parties and alliances	Popular vote			Seats	
Parties and alliances	Votes	%	±pp	Total	+/−
Spanish Socialist Workers' Party (PSOE)	251,908	30.84	+3.80	4	+1
Citizens–Party of the Citizenry (Cs)	159,316	19.50	+3.22	2	±0
People's Party (PP)	144,562	17.70	–16.67	2	–2
United We Can (Podemos–IULV–CA–Equo)	118,537	14.51	–4.40	2	±0
Vox (Vox)	114,199	13.98	+13.74	1	+1
Animalist Party Against Mistreatment of Animals (PACMA)	15,122	1.85	+0.30	0	±0
Zero Cuts–Green Group (Recortes Cero–GV)	1,769	0.22	+0.02	0	±0
Andalusia by Herself (AxSí)	1,655	0.20	New	0	±0
For a Fairer World (PUM+J)	1,046	0.13	New	0	±0
Communist Party of the Andalusian People (PCPA)	835	0.10	–0.03	0	±0
Communist Party of the Workers of Spain (PCTE)	631	0.08	New	0	±0
Blank ballots	7,288	0.89	+0.06		
Total	816,868			11	±0
Valid votes	816,868	98.84	–0.20		
Invalid votes	9,606	1.16	+0.20		
Votes cast / turnout	826,474	69.34	+4.71		
Abstentions	365,367	30.66	–4.71		
Registered voters	1,191,841				

=== 2016 ===
Summary of the 26 June 2016 Congress of Deputies election results in Málaga
Parties and alliances	Popular vote			Seats	
Parties and alliances	Votes	%	±pp	Total	+/−
People's Party (PP)	256,033	34.37	+5.43	4	±0
Spanish Socialist Workers' Party (PSOE)	201,444	27.04	+0.14	3	±0
United We Can for Andalusia (Podemos–IU–Equo)^{1}	140,829	18.91	–5.01	2	±0
Citizens–Party of the Citizenry (C's)	121,294	16.28	–0.79	2	±0
Animalist Party Against Mistreatment of Animals (PACMA)	11,523	1.55	+0.41	0	±0
Union, Progress and Democracy (UPyD)	1,832	0.25	–0.33	0	±0
Vox (Vox)	1,770	0.24	+0.01	0	±0
Zero Cuts–Green Group (Recortes Cero–GV)	1,461	0.20	+0.07	0	±0
We Are Andalusians Party, For Andalusia and the Peoples (AND)	1,121	0.15	New	0	±0
Communist Party of the Peoples of Spain (PCPE)	983	0.13	±0.00	0	±0
Revolutionary Anticapitalist Left (IZAR)	390	0.05	New	0	±0
Blank ballots	6,178	0.83	+0.09		
Total	744,858			11	±0
Valid votes	744,858	99.04	–0.12		
Invalid votes	7,228	0.96	+0.12		
Votes cast / turnout	752,086	64.63	–2.87		
Abstentions	411,571	35.37	+2.87		
Registered voters	1,163,657				
Sources
Footnotes: ^{1} United We Can results are compared to the combined totals of We Can and United Left/Greens–Assembly for Andalusia–Popular Unity in Common in the 2015 election.

=== 2015 ===
Summary of the 20 December 2015 Congress of Deputies election results in Málaga
Parties and alliances	Popular vote			Seats	
Parties and alliances	Votes	%	±pp	Total	+/−
People's Party (PP)	224,745	28.94	–20.72	4	–2
Spanish Socialist Workers' Party (PSOE)	208,896	26.90	–4.69	3	±0
We Can (Podemos)	132,980	17.12	New	2	+2
Citizens–Party of the Citizenry (C's)	132,586	17.07	New	2	+2
United Left/Greens–Assembly for Andalusia–Popular Unity (IULV–CA–UPeC)	52,772	6.80	–2.22	0	–1
Animalist Party Against Mistreatment of Animals (PACMA)	8,886	1.14	+0.74	0	±0
Union, Progress and Democracy (UPyD)	4,522	0.58	–5.03	0	±0
Vox (Vox)	1,817	0.23	New	0	±0
Communist Party of the Peoples of Spain (PCPE)	1,029	0.13	–0.02	0	±0
Zero Cuts–Green Group (Recortes Cero–GV)	974	0.13	New	0	±0
Málaga for Yes (mlgXSÍ)	934	0.12	New	0	±0
To Solution (Soluciona)	409	0.05	New	0	±0
Libertarian Party (P–LIB)	290	0.04	New	0	±0
Blank ballots	5,724	0.74	–0.42		
Total	776,564			11	+1
Valid votes	776,564	99.16	+0.10		
Invalid votes	6,594	0.84	–0.10		
Votes cast / turnout	783,158	67.50	+2.38		
Abstentions	377,058	32.50	–2.38		
Registered voters	1,160,216				

=== 2011 ===
Summary of the 20 November 2011 Congress of Deputies election results in Málaga
Parties and alliances	Popular vote			Seats	
Parties and alliances	Votes	%	±pp	Total	+/−
People's Party (PP)	357,578	49.66	+6.70	6	+1
Spanish Socialist Workers' Party (PSOE)	227,463	31.59	–15.39	3	–2
United Left/The Greens–Assembly for Andalusia: Plural Left (IULV–CA)	64,969	9.02	+3.95	1	+1
Union, Progress and Democracy (UPyD)	40,407	5.61	+4.65	0	±0
Andalusian Party (PA)^{1}	7,442	1.03	–0.43	0	±0
Equo (Equo)	5,369	0.75	New	0	±0
Animalist Party Against Mistreatment of Animals (PACMA)	2,903	0.40	+0.23	0	±0
Blank Seats (EB)	1,996	0.28	New	0	±0
Communist Party of the Peoples of Spain (PCPE)	1,108	0.15	+0.06	0	±0
Citizens' Action for Málaga (ACIMA)	966	0.13	New	0	±0
Humanist Party (PH)	756	0.10	+0.06	0	±0
Communist Unification of Spain (UCE)	383	0.05	New	0	±0
Internationalist Solidarity and Self-Management (SAIn)	341	0.05	New	0	±0
Blank ballots	8,350	1.16	+0.11		
Total	720,031			10	±0
Valid votes	720,031	99.06	–0.35		
Invalid votes	6,834	0.94	+0.35		
Votes cast / turnout	726,865	65.12	–6.23		
Abstentions	389,411	34.88	+6.23		
Registered voters	1,116,276				
Sources
Footnotes: ^{1} Andalusian Party results are compared to Andalusian Coalition totals in the 2008 election.

=== 2008 ===
Summary of the 9 March 2008 Congress of Deputies election results in Málaga
Parties and alliances	Popular vote			Seats	
Parties and alliances	Votes	%	±pp	Total	+/−
Spanish Socialist Workers' Party (PSOE)	359,046	46.98	–2.79	5	–1
People's Party (PP)	328,314	42.96	+6.55	5	+1
United Left/The Greens–Assembly for Andalusia–Alternative (IULV–CA)	38,716	5.07	–1.31	0	±0
Andalusian Coalition (CA)^{1}	11,177	1.46	–3.30	0	±0
Union, Progress and Democracy (UPyD)	7,327	0.96	New	0	±0
The Greens (Verdes)	3,251	0.43	New	0	±0
Anti-Bullfighting Party Against Mistreatment of Animals (PACMA)	1,308	0.17	New	0	±0
Citizens–Party of the Citizenry (C's)	1,224	0.16	New	0	±0
Navarrese Cannabis Representation (RCN/NOK)	1,155	0.15	New	0	±0
Social Democratic Party (PSD)	977	0.13	New	0	±0
Communist Party of the Peoples of Spain (PCPE)	702	0.09	+0.09	0	±0
For a Fairer World (PUM+J)	641	0.08	New	0	±0
National Democracy (DN)	346	0.05	+0.01	0	±0
Family and Life Party (PFyV)	331	0.04	–0.03	0	±0
Spanish Phalanx of the CNSO (FE de las JONS)	326	0.04	–0.01	0	±0
Humanist Party (PH)	318	0.04	–0.06	0	±0
National Alliance (AN)	272	0.04	New	0	±0
Spain 2000 (E–2000)	257	0.03	±0.00	0	±0
Authentic Phalanx (FA)	208	0.03	±0.00	0	±0
Spanish Alternative (AES)	195	0.03	New	0	±0
Spanish Front (Frente)	177	0.02	New	0	±0
Blank ballots	8,052	1.05	–0.71		
Total	764,320			10	±0
Valid votes	764,320	99.41	–0.05		
Invalid votes	4,557	0.59	+0.05		
Votes cast / turnout	768,877	71.35	–0.55		
Abstentions	308,673	28.65	+0.55		
Registered voters	1,077,550				
Sources
Footnotes: ^{1} Andalusian Coalition results are compared to the combined totals of Andalusian Party and Socialist Party of Andalusia in the 2004 election.

=== 2004 ===
Summary of the 14 March 2004 Congress of Deputies election results in Málaga
Parties and alliances	Popular vote			Seats	
Parties and alliances	Votes	%	±pp	Total	+/−
Spanish Socialist Workers' Party (PSOE)	367,758	49.77	+10.71	6	+2
People's Party (PP)	269,063	36.41	–7.06	4	–1
United Left/The Greens–Assembly for Andalusia (IULV–CA)	47,182	6.38	–1.74	0	–1
Andalusian Party (PA)	32,368	4.38	–0.79	0	±0
Socialist Party of Andalusia (PSA)	2,793	0.38	New	0	±0
Citizens for Blank Votes (CenB)	905	0.12	New	0	±0
Humanist Party (PH)	774	0.10	–0.02	0	±0
Republican Left (IR)	670	0.09	New	0	±0
Andalusia Assembly (A)	603	0.08	–0.02	0	±0
Democratic and Social Centre (CDS)	586	0.08	+0.01	0	±0
Family and Life Party (PFyV)	510	0.07	New	0	±0
Spanish Democratic Party (PADE)	460	0.06	+0.01	0	±0
Christian Positivist Party (PPCr)	392	0.05	New	0	±0
Spanish Phalanx of the CNSO (FE de las JONS)	340	0.05	New	0	±0
National Democracy (DN)	319	0.04	New	0	±0
National Union (UN)	318	0.04	–0.01	0	±0
The Phalanx (FE)	270	0.04	–0.03	0	±0
Spain 2000 (E–2000)	227	0.03	–0.01	0	±0
Authentic Phalanx (FA)	220	0.03	New	0	±0
Republican Social Movement (MSR)	196	0.03	New	0	±0
Communist Party of the Peoples of Spain (PCPE)	0	0.00	–0.20	0	±0
Blank ballots	13,022	1.76	+0.34		
Total	738,976			10	±0
Valid votes	738,976	99.46	+0.20		
Invalid votes	4,020	0.54	–0.20		
Votes cast / turnout	742,996	71.90	+6.88		
Abstentions	290,413	28.10	–6.88		
Registered voters	1,033,409				

=== 2000 ===
Summary of the 12 March 2000 Congress of Deputies election results in Málaga
Parties and alliances	Popular vote			Seats	
Parties and alliances	Votes	%	±pp	Total	+/−
People's Party (PP)	282,229	43.47	+4.97	5	+1
Spanish Socialist Workers' Party–Progressives (PSOE–p)	253,630	39.06	–2.98	4	–1
United Left/The Greens–Assembly for Andalusia (IULV–CA)	52,723	8.12	–7.04	1	±0
Andalusian Party (PA)	33,566	5.17	+2.47	0	±0
Liberal Independent Group (GIL)	10,570	1.63	New	0	±0
Andalusian Left (IA)	1,599	0.25	New	0	±0
Communist Party of the Peoples of Spain (PCPE)	1,292	0.20	+0.08	0	±0
Humanist Party (PH)	780	0.12	+0.03	0	±0
Andalusian Nation (NA)	721	0.11	+0.01	0	±0
Andalusia Assembly (A)	666	0.10	New	0	±0
Natural Law Party (PLN)	482	0.07	New	0	±0
The Phalanx (FE)	479	0.07	New	0	±0
Centrist Union–Democratic and Social Centre (UC–CDS)	441	0.07	–0.02	0	±0
National Union (UN)	314	0.05	New	0	±0
Spanish Democratic Party (PADE)	300	0.05	New	0	±0
Spain 2000 Platform (ES2000)	243	0.04	New	0	±0
Blank ballots	9,250	1.42	+0.45		
Total	649,285			10	±0
Valid votes	649,285	99.26	–0.15		
Invalid votes	4,814	0.74	+0.15		
Votes cast / turnout	654,099	65.02	–9.83		
Abstentions	351,930	34.98	+9.83		
Registered voters	1,006,029				

=== 1996 ===
Summary of the 3 March 1996 Congress of Deputies election results in Málaga
Parties and alliances	Popular vote			Seats	
Parties and alliances	Votes	%	±pp	Total	+/−
Spanish Socialist Workers' Party of Andalusia (PSOE–A)	288,165	42.04	–5.96	5	–1
People's Party (PP)	263,920	38.50	+7.49	4	+1
United Left/The Greens–Assembly for Andalusia (IULV–CA)	103,930	15.16	+1.06	1	±0
Andalusian Party (PA)^{1}	18,492	2.70	+0.03	0	±0
Authentic Spanish Phalanx (FEA)	985	0.14	New	0	±0
Communist Party of the Andalusian People (PCPA)	792	0.12	+0.03	0	±0
Andalusian Nation (NA)	686	0.10	New	0	±0
Democratic Andalusian Unity (UAD)	627	0.09	New	0	±0
Humanist Party (PH)	624	0.09	+0.06	0	±0
Centrist Union (UC)	589	0.09	–0.84	0	±0
Blank ballots	6,666	0.97	+0.48		
Total	685,476			10	±0
Valid votes	685,476	99.41	–0.06		
Invalid votes	4,062	0.59	+0.06		
Votes cast / turnout	689,538	74.85	+1.80		
Abstentions	231,700	25.15	–1.80		
Registered voters	921,238				
Sources
Footnotes: ^{1} Andalusian Party results are compared to the combined totals of Andalusian Party and Andalusian Progress Party in the 1993 election.

=== 1993 ===
Summary of the 6 June 1993 Congress of Deputies election results in Málaga
Parties and alliances	Popular vote			Seats	
Parties and alliances	Votes	%	±pp	Total	+/−
Spanish Socialist Workers' Party of Andalusia (PSOE–A)	304,745	48.00	–3.58	6	–1
People's Party (PP)	196,911	31.01	+11.54	3	+1
United Left–Assembly for Andalusia (IU–CA)	89,498	14.10	+0.47	1	±0
Andalusian Party (PA)	12,548	1.98	–3.16	0	±0
Liberal Independent Group (GIL)	8,004	1.26	New	0	±0
Democratic and Social Centre (CDS)	5,911	0.93	–4.64	0	±0
The Greens of Andalusia (Verdes)^{1}	4,976	0.78	+0.04	0	±0
Andalusian Progress Party (PAP)	4,403	0.69	New	0	±0
The Ecologists (LE)	2,069	0.33	–0.60	0	±0
Ruiz-Mateos Group–European Democratic Alliance (ARM–ADE)	915	0.14	–1.19	0	±0
Communist Party of the Andalusian People (PCPA)	591	0.09	–0.07	0	±0
Health and Ecology in Solidarity (SEES)	578	0.09	New	0	±0
Spanish Phalanx of the CNSO (FE–JONS)	444	0.07	–0.07	0	±0
Humanist Party (PH)	215	0.03	–0.04	0	±0
Communist Unification of Spain (UCE)	0	0.00	New	0	±0
Blank ballots	3,093	0.49	+0.08		
Total	634,901			10	±0
Valid votes	634,901	99.47	+0.13		
Invalid votes	3,366	0.53	–0.13		
Votes cast / turnout	638,267	73.05	+7.50		
Abstentions	235,510	26.95	–7.50		
Registered voters	873,777				
Sources
Footnotes: ^{1} The Greens of Andalusia results are compared to The Greens–Green List totals in the 1989 election.

=== 1989 ===
Summary of the 29 October 1989 Congress of Deputies election results in Málaga
Parties and alliances	Popular vote			Seats	
Parties and alliances	Votes	%	±pp	Total	+/−
Spanish Socialist Workers' Party of Andalusia (PSOE–A)	263,147	51.58	–5.79	7	+1
People's Party (PP)^{1}	99,352	19.47	–2.42	2	±0
United Left–Assembly for Andalusia (IU–CA)	69,522	13.63	+4.64	1	±0
Democratic and Social Centre (CDS)	28,434	5.57	–0.46	0	±0
Andalusian Party (PA)	26,201	5.14	+2.74	0	±0
Ruiz-Mateos Group (Ruiz-Mateos)	6,783	1.33	New	0	±0
The Ecologist Greens (LVE)	4,739	0.93	New	0	±0
The Greens–Green List (LV–LV)	3,790	0.74	New	0	±0
Workers' Socialist Party (PST)	1,987	0.39	New	0	±0
Workers' Party of Spain–Communist Unity (PTE–UC)^{2}	1,652	0.32	–0.51	0	±0
Communist Party of the Andalusian People (PCPA)	827	0.16	New	0	±0
Spanish Phalanx of the CNSO (FE–JONS)	722	0.14	–0.05	0	±0
Humanist Party (PH)	351	0.07	New	0	±0
Alliance for the Republic (AxR)	285	0.06	New	0	±0
Centrist Unity–Democratic Spanish Party (PED)	253	0.05	New	0	±0
Communist Party of Spain (Marxist–Leninist) (PCE (m–l))^{3}	0	0.00	–0.18	0	±0
Blank ballots	2,107	0.41	–0.10		
Total	510,152			10	+1
Valid votes	510,152	99.34	+0.94		
Invalid votes	3,405	0.66	–0.94		
Votes cast / turnout	513,557	65.55	–1.45		
Abstentions	269,912	34.45	+1.45		
Registered voters	783,469				
Sources
Footnotes: ^{1} People's Party results are compared to People's Coalition totals in the 1986 election.; ^{2} Workers' Party of Spain–Communist Unity results are compared to Communists' Unity Board totals in the 1986 election.; ^{3} Communist Party of Spain (Marxist–Leninist) results are compared to Republican Popular Unity totals in the 1986 election.

=== 1986 ===
Summary of the 22 June 1986 Congress of Deputies election results in Málaga
Parties and alliances	Popular vote			Seats	
Parties and alliances	Votes	%	±pp	Total	+/−
Spanish Socialist Workers' Party (PSOE)	284,757	57.37	–4.62	6	±0
People's Coalition (AP–PDP–PL)^{1}	108,640	21.89	–1.40	2	±0
United Left (IU)^{2}	44,595	8.99	+3.69	1	+1
Democratic and Social Centre (CDS)	29,925	6.03	+4.53	0	±0
Andalusian Party (PA)	11,933	2.40	+0.08	0	±0
Democratic Reformist Party (PRD)	4,438	0.89	New	0	±0
Communists' Unity Board (MUC)	4,097	0.83	New	0	±0
Socialist Party of the Andalusian People (PSPA)	2,589	0.52	New	0	±0
Spanish Phalanx of the CNSO (FE–JONS)	964	0.19	+0.19	0	±0
Communist Unification of Spain (UCE)	957	0.19	+0.12	0	±0
Republican Popular Unity (UPR)^{3}	894	0.18	+0.12	0	±0
Party of the Communists of Catalonia (PCC)	0	0.00	New	0	±0
Blank ballots	2,531	0.51	+0.23		
Total	496,320			9	+1
Valid votes	496,320	98.40	–0.52		
Invalid votes	8,058	1.60	+0.52		
Votes cast / turnout	504,378	67.00	–7.67		
Abstentions	248,453	33.00	+7.67		
Registered voters	752,831				
Sources
Footnotes: ^{1} People's Coalition results are compared to People's Alliance–People's Democratic Party totals in the 1982 election.; ^{2} United Left results are compared to Communist Party of Andalusia totals in the 1982 election.; ^{3} Republican Popular Unity results are compared to Communist Party of Spain (Marxist–Leninist) totals in the 1982 election.

=== 1982 ===
Summary of the 28 October 1982 Congress of Deputies election results in Málaga
Parties and alliances	Popular vote			Seats	
Parties and alliances	Votes	%	±pp	Total	+/−
Spanish Socialist Workers' Party of Andalusia (PSA–PSOE)	315,092	61.99	+26.05	6	+3
People's Alliance–People's Democratic Party (AP–PDP)^{1}	118,369	23.29	+19.34	2	+2
Communist Party of Andalusia (PCA–PCE)	26,935	5.30	–7.54	0	–1
Union of the Democratic Centre (UCD)	19,435	3.82	–25.27	0	–3
Socialist Party of Andalusia–Andalusian Party (PSA–PA)	11,770	2.32	–9.67	0	–1
Democratic and Social Centre (CDS)	7,637	1.50	New	0	±0
Workers' Socialist Party (PST)	2,420	0.48	New	0	±0
Spanish Communist Workers' Party (PCOE)	1,333	0.26	New	0	±0
New Force (FN)^{2}	1,298	0.26	–1.52	0	±0
Spanish Solidarity (SE)	929	0.18	New	0	±0
Communist Unity Candidacy (CUC)^{3}	509	0.10	–0.18	0	±0
Communist Unification of Spain (UCE)	331	0.07	New	0	±0
Communist Party of Spain (Marxist–Leninist) (PCE (m–l))	323	0.06	New	0	±0
Falangist Movement of Spain (MFE)	315	0.06	New	0	±0
Communist Movement of Andalusia (MCA)	66	0.01	–0.33	0	±0
Communist League–Internationalist Socialist Workers' Coalition (LC (COSI))	55	0.01	New	0	±0
Spanish Phalanx of the CNSO (FE–JONS)	22	0.00	New	0	±0
Revolutionary Communist League (LCR)	20	0.00	New	0	±0
Socialist Party (PS)^{4}	0	0.00	–1.12	0	±0
Blank ballots	1,401	0.28	+0.07		
Total	508,260			8	±0
Valid votes	508,260	98.92	+0.35		
Invalid votes	5,541	1.08	–0.35		
Votes cast / turnout	513,801	74.67	+10.37		
Abstentions	174,290	25.33	–10.37		
Registered voters	688,091				
Sources
Footnotes: ^{1} People's Alliance–People's Democratic Party results are compared to Democratic Coalition totals in the 1979 election.; ^{2} New Force results are compared to National Union totals in the 1979 election.; ^{3} Communist Unity Candidacy results are compared to Workers' Communist Party totals in the 1979 election.; ^{4} Socialist Party results are compared to Spanish Socialist Workers' Party (historical) totals in the 1979 election.

=== 1979 ===
Summary of the 1 March 1979 Congress of Deputies election results in Málaga
Parties and alliances	Popular vote			Seats	
Parties and alliances	Votes	%	±pp	Total	+/−
Spanish Socialist Workers' Party (PSOE)^{1}	148,497	35.94	–11.76	3	–1
Union of the Democratic Centre (UCD)	120,201	29.09	+2.53	3	±0
Communist Party of Spain (PCE)	53,036	12.84	+1.11	1	±0
Socialist Party of Andalusia–Andalusian Party (PSA–PA)	49,552	11.99	New	1	+1
Democratic Coalition (CD)^{2}	16,304	3.95	–4.07	0	±0
National Union (UN)	7,338	1.78	New	0	±0
Party of Labour of Spain (PTE)^{3}	6,948	1.68	+0.50	0	±0
Spanish Socialist Workers' Party (historical) (PSOEh)^{4}	4,628	1.12	+0.77	0	±0
Communist Movement–Organization of Communist Left (MC–OIC)^{5}	1,408	0.34	+0.29	0	±0
Workers' Communist Party (PCT)	1,174	0.28	New	0	±0
Republican Left (IR)	953	0.23	New	0	±0
Communist Organization of Spain (Red Flag) (OCE–BR)	932	0.23	New	0	±0
Workers' Revolutionary Organization (ORT)	605	0.15	New	0	±0
Carlist Party (PC)	466	0.11	New	0	±0
Union for the Freedom of Speech (ULE)	260	0.06	New	0	±0
Blank ballots	877	0.21	±0.00		
Total	413,179			8	±0
Valid votes	413,179	98.57	–0.06		
Invalid votes	5,978	1.43	+0.06		
Votes cast / turnout	419,157	64.30	–13.06		
Abstentions	232,719	35.70	+13.06		
Registered voters	651,876				
Sources
Footnotes: ^{1} Spanish Socialist Workers' Party results are compared to the combined totals of Spanish Socialist Workers' Party and People's Socialist Party–Socialist Unity in the 1977 election.; ^{2} Democratic Coalition results are compared to People's Alliance totals in the 1977 election.; ^{3} Party of Labour of Spain results are compared to Democratic Left Front totals in the 1977 election.; ^{4} Spanish Socialist Workers' Party (historical) results are compared to Democratic Socialist Alliance totals in the 1977 election.; ^{5} Communist Movement–Organization of Communist Left results are compared to Left Andalusian Bloc totals in the 1977 election.

=== 1977 ===
Summary of the 15 June 1977 Congress of Deputies election results in Málaga
Parties and alliances	Popular vote			Seats	
Parties and alliances	Votes	%	±pp	Total	+/−
Spanish Socialist Workers' Party (PSOE)	185,095	42.60	n/a	4	n/a
Union of the Democratic Centre (UCD)	115,390	26.56	n/a	3	n/a
Communist Party of Spain (PCE)	50,990	11.73	n/a	1	n/a
People's Alliance (AP)	34,838	8.02	n/a	0	n/a
People's Socialist Party–Socialist Unity (PSP–US)	22,144	5.10	n/a	0	n/a
Spanish Social Reform (RSE)	7,049	1.62	n/a	0	n/a
Democratic Left Front (FDI)	5,106	1.18	n/a	0	n/a
Federation of Christian Democracy (FPD–ID)	3,942	0.91	n/a	0	n/a
Andalusian Socialist Movement (MSA)	3,245	0.75	n/a	0	n/a
Democratic Socialist Alliance (ASDCI)	1,536	0.35	n/a	0	n/a
Small Business Independent Candidates (CIPYE)	1,480	0.34	n/a	0	n/a
Spanish Phalanx of the CNSO (Authentic) (FE–JONS(A))	1,444	0.33	n/a	0	n/a
National Association for the Study of Current Problems (ANEPA–CP)	1,124	0.26	n/a	0	n/a
Left Andalusian Bloc (BAI)	226	0.05	n/a	0	n/a
Blank ballots	912	0.21	n/a		
Total	434,521			8	n/a
Valid votes	434,521	98.63	n/a		
Invalid votes	6,053	1.37	n/a		
Votes cast / turnout	440,574	77.36	n/a		
Abstentions	128,961	22.64	n/a		
Registered voters	569,535				

== Bibliography ==
- Ley 1/1977, de 4 de enero, para la Reforma Política (Fundamental Law 1/1977). Official State Gazette (in Spanish). 4 January 1977. BOE-A-1977-165.
- Real Decreto-ley 20/1977, de 18 de marzo, sobre Normas Electorales (Royal Decree-Law 20/1977). Official State Gazette (in Spanish). 18 March 1977. BOE-A-1977-7445.
- Constitución Española (Constitution). Official State Gazette (in Spanish). 27 December 1978. BOE-A-1978-31229.
- Ley Orgánica 5/1985, de 19 de junio, del Régimen Electoral General (Organic Law 5/1985). Official State Gazette (in Spanish). 19 June 1985. BOE-A-1985-11672.
- Carreras de Odriozola, Albert; Tafunell Sambola, Xavier (2005) [1989]. Estadísticas históricas de España, siglos XIX-XX (PDF) (in Spanish). Vol. 1 (II ed.). Bilbao: Fundación BBVA. pp. 1072–1097. ISBN 84-96515-00-1. Archived from the original (PDF) on 24 September 2015.
