= Melilla (Congress of Deputies constituency) =

Electoral constituency in Spain

Coordinates: 35°16′N 2°56′W

- Congress of Deputies; Electoral constituency
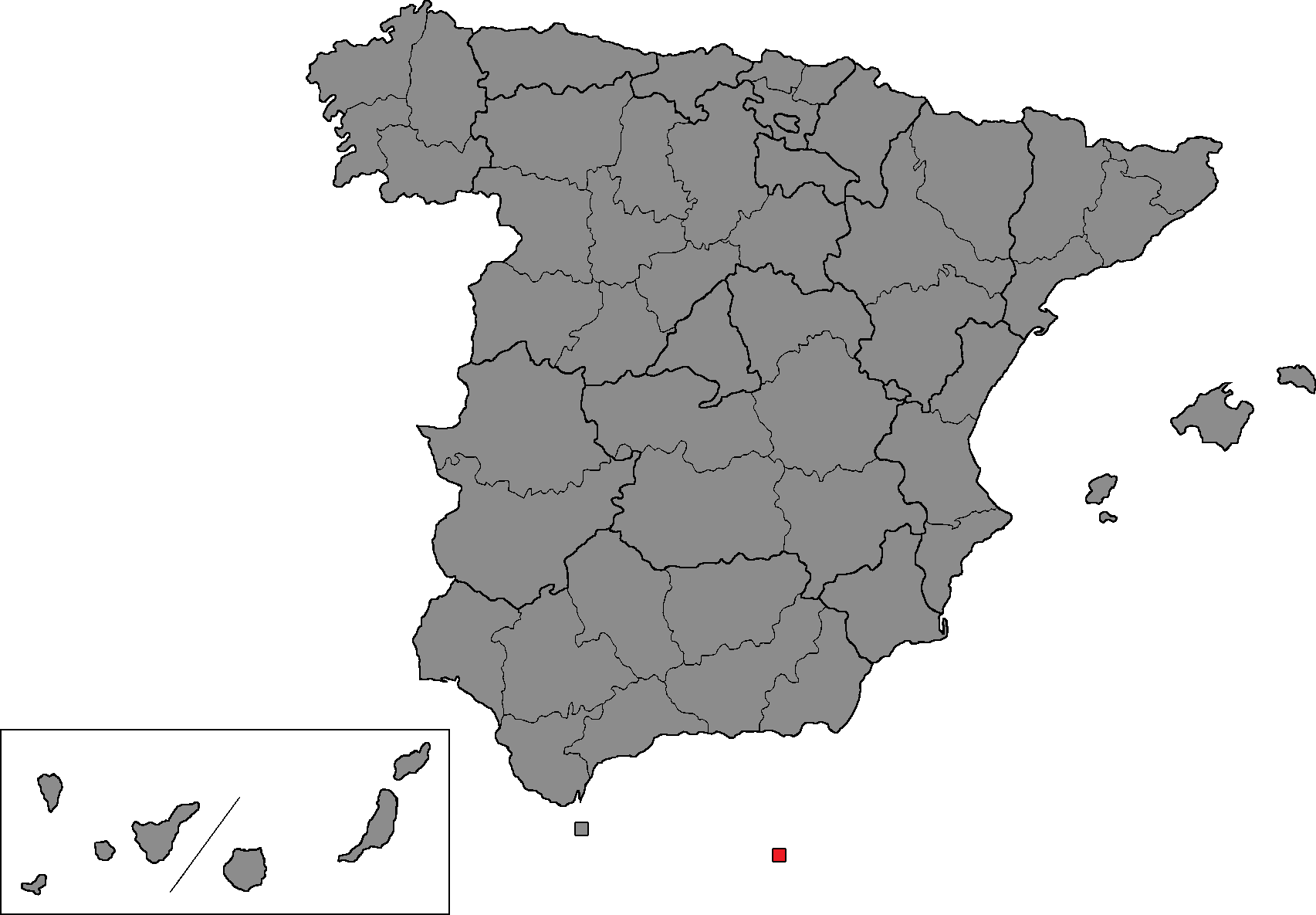
- Location of Melilla within Spain.
- Province: Málaga (1977–1995); None (1995–present)
- Autonomous community: Andalusia (1977–1995); None (1995–present)
- Population: ▲85,811 (2024)
- Electorate: ▲61,118 (2023)
- Major settlements: Melilla

Current constituency
- Created: 1977
- Seats: 1
- Member: PP (1)

Melilla is one of the 52 constituencies represented in the Congress of Deputies, the lower chamber of the Spanish parliament, the Cortes Generales. The constituency (whose boundaries correspond to those of the homonymous autonomous city) currently elects one deputy using plurality voting.

== Electoral system ==
The constituency was created as per the Political Reform Law and was first contested in the 1977 general election. The Law provided for the provinces of Spain to be established as multi-member districts in the Congress of Deputies, with this regulation being maintained under the Spanish Constitution of 1978. Additionally, the Constitution requires for any modification of the provincial limits to be approved under an organic law, needing an absolute majority in the Cortes Generales.

Voting is based on universal suffrage, comprising all Spanish nationals over 18 years of age with full political rights, provided that they have not been deprived of the right to vote by a final sentence. The only exception was in 1977, when this was limited to nationals over 21 years of age and in full enjoyment of their political and civil rights. Amendments in 2011 required non-resident citizens to apply for voting, a system known as "begged" voting (Spanish: Voto rogado). which was abolished in 2022. Further, amendments in 2018 granted the right to vote to those legally incapacitated. The Congress of Deputies has a minimum of 300 and a maximum of 400 seats, with electoral provisions fixing its size at 350. Of these, 348 are elected in 50 multi-member constituencies corresponding to the provinces of Spain—each of which is assigned an initial minimum of two seats and the remaining 248 distributed in proportion to population—using the D'Hondt method and closed-list proportional voting, with a three percent-threshold of valid votes (including blank ballots) in each constituency. The remaining two seats are allocated to Ceuta and Melilla as single-member districts elected by plurality voting. The use of this electoral method may result in a higher effective threshold depending on district magnitude and vote distribution. The law does not provide for by-elections to fill vacant seats; instead, any vacancies arising after the proclamation of candidates and during the legislative term are filled by the next candidates on the party lists or, when required, by designated substitutes.

The electoral law allows for parties and federations registered in the interior ministry, alliances and groupings of electors to present lists of candidates. Parties and federations intending to form an alliance are required to inform the relevant electoral commission within 10 days of the election call—15 before 1985—whereas groupings of electors need to secure the signature of at least one percent of the electorate in the constituencies for which they seek election—one permille of the electorate, with a compulsory minimum of 500 signatures, until 1985—disallowing electors from signing for more than one list. Also since 2011, parties, federations or alliances that have not obtained a mandate in either chamber of the Cortes at the preceding election are required to secure the signature of at least 0.1 percent of electors in the aforementioned constituencies. Amendments in 2007 required a balanced composition of men and women in the electoral lists, so that candidates of either sex made up at least 40 percent of the total composition; further amendments in 2024 required the use of a zipper system.

== Deputies ==
Deputies 1977–present
Key to parties PSOE UCD PP CP
Legislature	Election	Distribution
Constituent	1977	1
1st	1979	1
2nd	1982	1
3rd	1986	1
4th	1989	1
5th	1993	1
6th	1996	1
7th	2000	1
8th	2004	1
9th	2008	1
10th	2011	1
11th	2015	1
12th	2016	1
13th	2019 (Apr)	1
14th	2019 (Nov)	1
15th	2023	1

== General elections ==
=== 2026 ===
Summary of the 29 November 2026 Congress of Deputies election results in Melilla
Parties and alliances	Popular vote			Seats	
Parties and alliances	Votes	%	±pp	Total	+/−
People's Party (PP)					
Spanish Socialist Workers' Party (PSOE)					
Vox (Vox)					
Workers' Front (FO)			New		
The Party is Over (SALF)			New		
Blank Seats to Leave Empty Seats (EB)			New		
Blank ballots					
Total				1	±0
Valid votes					
Invalid votes					
Votes cast / turnout					
Abstentions					
Registered voters	63,968				

=== 2023 ===
Summary of the 23 July 2023 Congress of Deputies election results in Melilla
Parties and alliances	Popular vote			Seats	
Parties and alliances	Votes	%	±pp	Total	+/−
People's Party (PP)	13,446	49.16	+19.62	1	±0
Spanish Socialist Workers' Party (PSOE)	6,943	25.39	+8.94	0	±0
Vox (Vox)	4,359	15.94	–2.46	0	±0
Coalition for Melilla (CpM)	1,298	4.75	–24.20	0	±0
Unite (Sumar)^{1}	827	3.02	+0.40	0	±0
Animalist Party with the Environment (PACMA)	160	0.59	New	0	±0
For a Fairer World (PUM+J)	40	0.15	+0.05	0	±0
Zero Cuts (Recortes Cero)	23	0.08	+0.02	0	±0
Blank ballots	253	0.93	+0.33		
Total	27,349			1	±0
Valid votes	27,349	98.91	–0.32		
Invalid votes	300	1.09	+0.32		
Votes cast / turnout	27,649	45.24	–7.15		
Abstentions	33,469	54.76	+7.15		
Registered voters	61,118				
Sources
Footnotes: ^{1} Unite results are compared to United We Can totals in the November 2019 election.

=== November 2019 ===
Summary of the 10 November 2019 Congress of Deputies election results in Melilla
Parties and alliances	Popular vote			Seats	
Parties and alliances	Votes	%	±pp	Total	+/−
People's Party (PP)	9,136	29.54	+5.58	1	±0
Coalition for Melilla (CpM)	8,955	28.95	+8.64	0	±0
Vox (Vox)	5,692	18.40	+1.20	0	±0
Spanish Socialist Workers' Party (PSOE)	5,087	16.45	–4.25	0	±0
Citizens–Party of the Citizenry (Cs)	917	2.96	–9.93	0	±0
United We Can (Podemos–IU)	809	2.62	–1.21	0	±0
The Greens (Verdes)	101	0.33	New	0	±0
For a Fairer World (PUM+J)	31	0.10	–0.02	0	±0
Zero Cuts–Green Group (Recortes Cero–GV)	19	0.06	–0.23	0	±0
Blank ballots	185	0.60	–0.10		
Total	30,932			1	±0
Valid votes	30,932	99.23	+0.17		
Invalid votes	240	0.77	–0.17		
Votes cast / turnout	31,172	52.39	–5.14		
Abstentions	28,325	47.61	+5.14		
Registered voters	59,497				

=== April 2019 ===
Summary of the 28 April 2019 Congress of Deputies election results in Melilla
Parties and alliances	Popular vote			Seats	
Parties and alliances	Votes	%	±pp	Total	+/−
People's Party (PP)	8,087	23.96	–25.90	1	±0
Spanish Socialist Workers' Party (PSOE)	6,989	20.70	–4.39	0	±0
Coalition for Melilla (CpM)	6,857	20.31	New	0	±0
Vox (Vox)	5,807	17.20	New	0	±0
Citizens–Party of the Citizenry (Cs)	4,351	12.89	+0.53	0	±0
United We Can (Podemos–IU–Equo)	1,292	3.83	–6.00	0	±0
Zero Cuts–Green Group (Recortes Cero–GV)	99	0.29	+0.13	0	±0
For a Fairer World (PUM+J)	39	0.12	New	0	±0
Blank ballots	237	0.70	–0.29		
Total	33,758			1	±0
Valid votes	33,758	99.06	+0.38		
Invalid votes	319	0.94	–0.38		
Votes cast / turnout	34,077	57.53	+9.98		
Abstentions	25,156	42.47	–9.98		
Registered voters	59,233				

=== 2016 ===
Summary of the 26 June 2016 Congress of Deputies election results in Melilla
Parties and alliances	Popular vote			Seats	
Parties and alliances	Votes	%	±pp	Total	+/−
People's Party (PP)	13,522	49.86	+5.95	1	±0
Spanish Socialist Workers' Party (PSOE)	6,805	25.09	+0.50	0	±0
Citizens–Party of the Citizenry (C's)	3,352	12.36	–3.19	0	±0
United We Can (Unidos Podemos)^{1}	2,667	9.83	–2.92	0	±0
Animalist Party Against Mistreatment of Animals (PACMA)	317	1.17	+0.05	0	±0
Union, Progress and Democracy (UPyD)	146	0.54	–0.31	0	±0
Zero Cuts–Green Group (Recortes Cero–GV)	44	0.16	±0.00	0	±0
Blank ballots	268	0.99	–0.07		
Total	27,121			1	±0
Valid votes	27,121	99.68	–0.04		
Invalid votes	362	1.32	+0.04		
Votes cast / turnout	27,483	47.55	–1.80		
Abstentions	30,312	52.45	+1.80		
Registered voters	57,795				
Sources
Footnotes: ^{1} United We Can results are compared to the combined totals of We Can and Popular Unity–United Left in the 2015 election.

=== 2015 ===
Summary of the 20 December 2015 Congress of Deputies election results in Melilla
Parties and alliances	Popular vote			Seats	
Parties and alliances	Votes	%	±pp	Total	+/−
People's Party (PP)	12,331	43.91	–22.80	1	±0
Spanish Socialist Workers' Party (PSOE)	6,905	24.59	–0.73	0	±0
Citizens–Party of the Citizenry (C's)	4,366	15.55	New	0	±0
We Can (Podemos)	3,215	11.45	New	0	±0
Popular Unity–United Left (UP–IU)	366	1.30	New	0	±0
Animalist Party Against Mistreatment of Animals (PACMA)	314	1.12	+0.61	0	±0
Union, Progress and Democracy (UPyD)	240	0.85	–2.86	0	±0
Zero Cuts–Green Group (Recortes Cero–GV)	46	0.16	New	0	±0
Blank ballots	299	1.06	–0.80		
Total	28,082			1	±0
Valid votes	28,082	98.72	–0.14		
Invalid votes	363	1.28	+0.14		
Votes cast / turnout	28,445	49.35	–0.08		
Abstentions	29,194	50.65	+0.08		
Registered voters	57,639				

=== 2011 ===
Summary of the 20 November 2011 Congress of Deputies election results in Melilla
Parties and alliances	Popular vote			Seats	
Parties and alliances	Votes	%	±pp	Total	+/−
People's Party (PP)	17,828	66.71	+17.68	1	±0
Spanish Socialist Workers' Party (PSOE)	6,766	25.32	–22.78	0	±0
Union, Progress and Democracy (UPyD)	992	3.71	+2.57	0	±0
Equo (Equo)	427	1.60	New	0	±0
Animalist Party Against Mistreatment of Animals (PACMA)	137	0.51	New	0	±0
For a Fairer World (PUM+J)	80	0.30	+0.20	0	±0
Blank ballots	496	1.86	+0.97		
Total	26,726			1	±0
Valid votes	26,726	98.86	–0.40		
Invalid votes	308	1.14	+0.40		
Votes cast / turnout	27,034	49.43	–14.25		
Abstentions	27,656	50.57	+14.25		
Registered voters	54,690				

=== 2008 ===
Summary of the 9 March 2008 Congress of Deputies election results in Melilla
Parties and alliances	Popular vote			Seats	
Parties and alliances	Votes	%	±pp	Total	+/−
People's Party (PP)	15,717	49.03	–5.57	1	±0
Spanish Socialist Workers' Party (PSOE)	15,420	48.10	+6.67	0	±0
Union, Progress and Democracy (UPyD)	367	1.14	New	0	±0
The Greens–Green Group (LV–GV)	77	0.24	–0.26	0	±0
Social Democratic Party (PSD)	73	0.23	New	0	±0
Spanish Phalanx of the CNSO (FE de las JONS)	44	0.14	New	0	±0
Citizens–Party of the Citizenry (C's)	39	0.12	New	0	±0
For a Fairer World (PUM+J)	33	0.10	New	0	±0
Blank ballots	285	0.89	–0.71		
Total	32,055			1	±0
Valid votes	32,055	99.26	+0.08		
Invalid votes	240	0.74	–0.08		
Votes cast / turnout	32,295	63.68	+7.84		
Abstentions	18,416	36.32	–7.84		
Registered voters	50,711				

=== 2004 ===
Summary of the 14 March 2004 Congress of Deputies election results in Melilla
Parties and alliances	Popular vote			Seats	
Parties and alliances	Votes	%	±pp	Total	+/−
People's Party (PP)	14,856	54.60	+4.80	1	±0
Spanish Socialist Workers' Party (PSOE)	11,273	41.43	+21.01	0	±0
United Left (IU)	229	0.84	–0.67	0	±0
The Greens–Green Group (LV–GV)	135	0.50	–0.16	0	±0
Democratic and Social Centre (CDS)	89	0.33	New	0	±0
Republican Left (IR)	57	0.21	New	0	±0
The Phalanx (FE)	46	0.17	–0.01	0	±0
Spanish Democratic Party (PADE)	35	0.13	+0.08	0	±0
National Democracy (DN)	30	0.11	New	0	±0
Spain 2000 (E–2000)	22	0.08	New	0	±0
Blank ballots	435	1.60	–0.50		
Total	27,207			1	±0
Valid votes	27,207	99.18	–0.10		
Invalid votes	225	0.82	+0.10		
Votes cast / turnout	27,432	55.84	+1.84		
Abstentions	21,697	44.16	–1.84		
Registered voters	49,129				

=== 2000 ===
Summary of the 12 March 2000 Congress of Deputies election results in Melilla
Parties and alliances	Popular vote			Seats	
Parties and alliances	Votes	%	±pp	Total	+/−
People's Party–Melillan People's Union (PP–UPM)	13,078	49.80	–0.77	1	±0
Localist Bloc of Melilla (BLM)	6,514	24.81	New	0	±0
Spanish Socialist Workers' Party–Progressives (PSOE–p)	5,363	20.42	–22.90	0	±0
United Left (IU)	397	1.51	–1.97	0	±0
The Greens–Green Group (LV–GV)	174	0.66	New	0	±0
Nationalist Aprome (Aprome)	60	0.23	–0.50	0	±0
The Phalanx (FE)	48	0.18	New	0	±0
Independent Spanish Phalanx–Phalanx 2000 (FEI–FE 2000)	38	0.14	+0.02	0	±0
Natural Law Party (PLN)	23	0.09	New	0	±0
Spanish Democratic Party (PADE)	13	0.05	New	0	±0
Blank ballots	551	2.10	+0.48		
Total	26,259			1	±0
Valid votes	26,259	99.28	+0.19		
Invalid votes	191	0.72	–0.19		
Votes cast / turnout	26,450	54.00	–7.95		
Abstentions	22,535	46.00	+7.95		
Registered voters	48,985				

=== 1996 ===
Summary of the 3 March 1996 Congress of Deputies election results in Melilla
Parties and alliances	Popular vote			Seats	
Parties and alliances	Votes	%	±pp	Total	+/−
People's Party (PP)	13,788	50.57	+5.65	1	+1
Spanish Socialist Workers' Party (PSOE)	11,810	43.32	–5.47	0	–1
United Left (IU)	950	3.48	+0.88	0	±0
Nationalist Party of Melilla (PNM)	200	0.73	New	0	±0
Centrist Union (UC)	74	0.27	–1.88	0	±0
Blank ballots	441	1.62	+0.39		
Total	27,263			1	±0
Valid votes	27,263	99.09	–0.48		
Invalid votes	251	0.91	+0.48		
Votes cast / turnout	27,514	61.95	–4.19		
Abstentions	16,901	38.05	+4.19		
Registered voters	44,415				

=== 1993 ===
Summary of the 6 June 1993 Congress of Deputies election results in Melilla
Parties and alliances	Popular vote			Seats	
Parties and alliances	Votes	%	±pp	Total	+/−
Spanish Socialist Workers' Party (PSOE)	12,885	48.79	+10.29	1	+1
People's Party (PP)	11,865	44.92	–10.76	0	–1
United Left (IU)	687	2.60	New	0	±0
Democratic and Social Centre (CDS)	569	2.15	+0.35	0	±0
Natural Law Party (PLN)	80	0.30	New	0	±0
Blank ballots	325	1.23	+0.33		
Total	26,411			1	±0
Valid votes	26,411	99.57	+0.28		
Invalid votes	115	0.43	–0.28		
Votes cast / turnout	26,526	66.14	+14.25		
Abstentions	13,579	33.86	–14.25		
Registered voters	40,105				

=== 1989 ===
The results of the 1989 general election in Melilla were annulled by the Spanish Constitutional Court because of perceived irregularities in the vote tally, with provisional results awarding the district's single seat to the Spanish Socialist Workers' Party by 507 votes. After a re-run election was held on 25 March 1990, the district's seat was won by the People's Party with a large majority of 3,007 votes.

Summary of the 25 March 1990 Congress of Deputies re-run election results in Melilla
Parties and alliances	Popular vote			Seats	
Parties and alliances	Votes	%	±pp	Total	+/−
People's Party (PP)^{1}	9,748	55.68	+9.74	1	±0
Spanish Socialist Workers' Party (PSOE)	6,741	38.50	+2.85	0	±0
Democratic and Social Centre (CDS)	316	1.80	–9.42	0	±0
Spanish Nationalist Party of Melilla (PNEM)	301	1.72	New	0	±0
Workers' Socialist Party (PST)	130	0.74	New	0	±0
Communist Party of the Peoples of Spain (PCPE)	115	0.66	New	0	±0
Blank ballots	157	0.90	–0.56		
Total	17,508			1	±0
Valid votes	17,508	99.29	+0.41		
Invalid votes	126	0.71	–0.41		
Votes cast / turnout	17,634	51.89	–8.09		
Abstentions	16,351	48.11	+8.09		
Registered voters	33,985				
Sources
Footnotes: ^{1} People's Party results are compared to People's Coalition totals in the 1986 election.

Summary of the 29 October 1989 Congress of Deputies election results in Melilla (annulled)
Parties and alliances	Popular vote			Seats	
Parties and alliances	Votes	%	±pp	Total	+/−
Spanish Socialist Workers' Party (PSOE)	8,178	42.00	+6.35	1	+1
People's Party (PP)^{1}	7,671	39.40	–6.54	0	–1
Democratic and Social Centre (CDS)	1,644	8.44	–2.78	0	±0
Spanish Nationalist Party of Melilla (PNEM)	1,374	7.06	New	0	±0
Communist Party of the Peoples of Spain (PCPE)	204	1.05	New	0	±0
Workers' Socialist Party (PST)	131	0.67	New	0	±0
Blank ballots	270	1.39	–0.07		
Total	19,472			1	±0
Valid votes	19,472	98.72	–0.16		
Invalid votes	253	1.28	+0.16		
Votes cast / turnout	19,725	57.95	–2.03		
Abstentions	14,314	42.05	+2.03		
Registered voters	34,039				
Sources
Footnotes: ^{1} People's Party results are compared to People's Coalition totals in the 1986 election.

=== 1986 ===
Summary of the 22 June 1986 Congress of Deputies election results in Melilla
Parties and alliances	Popular vote			Seats	
Parties and alliances	Votes	%	±pp	Total	+/−
People's Coalition (AP–PDP–PL)^{1}	9,082	45.94	+19.51	1	+1
Spanish Socialist Workers' Party (PSOE)	7,048	35.65	–13.34	0	–1
Democratic and Social Centre (CDS)	2,218	11.22	+3.53	0	±0
United Left (IU)	549	2.78	New	0	±0
Democratic Reformist Party (PRD)	465	2.35	New	0	±0
Communist Unification of Spain (UCE)	118	0.60	+0.29	0	±0
Blank ballots	289	1.46	+0.74		
Total	19,769			1	±0
Valid votes	19,769	98.88	–0.09		
Invalid votes	224	1.12	+0.09		
Votes cast / turnout	19,993	59.98	–10.52		
Abstentions	13,337	40.02	+10.52		
Registered voters	33,330				
Sources
Footnotes: ^{1} People's Coalition results are compared to People's Alliance–People's Democratic Party totals in the 1982 election.

=== 1982 ===
Summary of the 28 October 1982 Congress of Deputies election results in Melilla
Parties and alliances	Popular vote			Seats	
Parties and alliances	Votes	%	±pp	Total	+/−
Spanish Socialist Workers' Party (PSOE)	10,291	48.99	+27.59	1	+1
People's Alliance–People's Democratic Party (AP–PDP)^{1}	5,551	26.43	+21.59	0	±0
Union of the Democratic Centre (UCD)	3,083	14.68	–36.89	0	–1
Democratic and Social Centre (CDS)	1,615	7.69	New	0	±0
New Force (FN)^{2}	143	0.68	–1.77	0	±0
Spanish Solidarity (SE)	105	0.50	New	0	±0
Communist Unification of Spain (UCE)	66	0.31	New	0	±0
Communist Movement (MC)	0	0.00	–1.03	0	±0
Workers' Socialist Party (PST)	0	0.00	New	0	±0
Blank ballots	152	0.72	+0.36		
Total	21,006			1	±0
Valid votes	21,006	98.97	–0.09		
Invalid votes	218	1.03	+0.09		
Votes cast / turnout	21,224	70.50	+9.83		
Abstentions	8,883	29.50	–9.83		
Registered voters	30,107				
Sources
Footnotes: ^{1} People's Alliance–People's Democratic Party results are compared to Democratic Coalition totals in the 1979 election.; ^{2} New Force results are compared to National Union totals in the 1979 election.

=== 1979 ===
Summary of the 1 March 1979 Congress of Deputies election results in Melilla
Parties and alliances	Popular vote			Seats	
Parties and alliances	Votes	%	±pp	Total	+/−
Union of the Democratic Centre (UCD)	9,035	51.57	–4.70	1	±0
Spanish Socialist Workers' Party (PSOE)	3,750	21.40	–5.72	0	±0
Independent Candidates of Melilla (CIME)	1,820	10.39	New	0	±0
Democratic Coalition (CD)^{1}	848	4.84	–6.04	0	±0
Communist Party of Spain (PCE)	793	4.53	–0.54	0	±0
National Union (UN)	429	2.45	New	0	±0
Party of Labour of Spain (PTE)	353	2.01	New	0	±0
Carlist Party (PC)	194	1.11	New	0	±0
Communist Movement–Organization of Communist Left (MC–OIC)	180	1.03	New	0	±0
Workers' Revolutionary Organization (ORT)	46	0.26	New	0	±0
Union for the Freedom of Speech (ULE)	9	0.05	New	0	±0
Blank ballots	63	0.36	–0.20		
Total	17,520			1	±0
Valid votes	17,520	99.06	+0.28		
Invalid votes	166	0.94	–0.28		
Votes cast / turnout	17,686	60.67	–15.37		
Abstentions	11,463	39.33	+15.37		
Registered voters	29,149				
Sources
Footnotes: ^{1} Democratic Coalition results are compared to People's Alliance totals in the 1977 election.

=== 1977 ===
Summary of the 15 June 1977 Congress of Deputies election results in Melilla
Parties and alliances	Popular vote			Seats	
Parties and alliances	Votes	%	±pp	Total	+/−
Union of the Democratic Centre (UCD)	10,723	56.27	n/a	1	n/a
Spanish Socialist Workers' Party (PSOE)	5,168	27.12	n/a	0	n/a
People's Alliance (AP)	2,074	10.88	n/a	0	n/a
Communist Party of Spain (PCE)	966	5.07	n/a	0	n/a
Blank ballots	107	0.56	n/a		
Total	19,056			1	n/a
Valid votes	19,056	98.78	n/a		
Invalid votes	235	1.22	n/a		
Votes cast / turnout	19,291	76.04	n/a		
Abstentions	6,077	23.96	n/a		
Registered voters	25,368				

== Bibliography ==
- Ley 1/1977, de 4 de enero, para la Reforma Política (Fundamental Law 1/1977). Official State Gazette (in Spanish). 4 January 1977. BOE-A-1977-165.
- Real Decreto-ley 20/1977, de 18 de marzo, sobre Normas Electorales (Royal Decree-Law 20/1977). Official State Gazette (in Spanish). 18 March 1977. BOE-A-1977-7445.
- Constitución Española (Constitution). Official State Gazette (in Spanish). 27 December 1978. BOE-A-1978-31229.
- Ley Orgánica 5/1985, de 19 de junio, del Régimen Electoral General (Organic Law 5/1985). Official State Gazette (in Spanish). 19 June 1985. BOE-A-1985-11672.
- Carreras de Odriozola, Albert; Tafunell Sambola, Xavier (2005) [1989]. Estadísticas históricas de España, siglos XIX-XX (PDF) (in Spanish). Vol. 1 (II ed.). Bilbao: Fundación BBVA. pp. 1072–1097. ISBN 84-96515-00-1. Archived from the original (PDF) on 24 September 2015.
