= Opinion polling for the 2000 Spanish general election =

In the run up to the 2000 Spanish general election, various organisations carried out opinion polling to gauge voting intention in Spain during the term of the 6th Cortes Generales. Results of such polls are displayed in this article. The date range for these opinion polls is from the previous general election, held on 3 March 1996, to the day the next election was held, on 12 March 2000.

Voting intention estimates refer mainly to a hypothetical Congress of Deputies election. Polls are listed in reverse chronological order, showing the most recent first and using the dates when the survey fieldwork was done, as opposed to the date of publication. Where the fieldwork dates are unknown, the date of publication is given instead. The highest percentage figure in each polling survey is displayed with its background shaded in the leading party's colour. If a tie ensues, this is applied to the figures with the highest percentages. The "Lead" columns on the right shows the percentage-point difference between the parties with the highest percentages in a poll.

== Electoral polling ==
=== Nationwide polling ===
==== Graphical summary ====
Local regression trend line of poll results from 3 March 1996 to 12 March 2000, with each line corresponding to a political party.

==== Voting intention estimates ====
The table below lists nationwide voting intention estimates. Refusals are generally excluded from the party vote percentages, while question wording and the treatment of "don't know" responses and those not intending to vote may vary between polling organisations. When available, seat projections determined by the polling organisations are displayed below (or in place of) the percentages in a smaller font; 176 seats were required for an absolute majority in the Congress of Deputies.

Color key:

Poll conducted after legal ban on opinion polls Exit poll

Polling firm/Commissioner	Fieldwork date	Sample size	Turnout	PP	PSOE	IU	CiU	PNV	CC	BNG	HB EH	ERC	NI/IC	Lead
2000 general election	12 Mar 2000	—N/a	68.7	44.5; 183	34.2; 125	5.4; 8	4.2; 15	1.5; 7	1.1; 4	1.3; 3	–	0.8; 1	0.5; 1	10.3
Eco Consulting/RTVE	12 Mar 2000	?	? (Note: Unweighted data.)	42.1; 173/180	32.9; 122/126	7.5; 10/13	4.0; 14/16	1.9; 8/9	0.9; 4	1.6; 4/6	–	1.0; 2	0.5; 1	9.2
Eco Consulting/RTVE	12 Mar 2000	?	?	41.6; 168/173	34.6; 130/134	7.0; 10/12	4.0; 14/16	1.6; 7	0.9; 4	1.5; 5/6	–	0.9; 1	0.4; 1	7.0
Sigma Dos/Antena 3	12 Mar 2000	?	?	41.1; 162/173	36.8; 133/143	6.6; 9/11	4.3; 14/15	1.8; 7	1.1; 4	1.3; 4/5	–	1.1; 2	? 0/1	4.3
Opitel/Tele 5	12 Mar 2000	?	?	42.0; 168/173	37.0; 131/136	7.5; 12/13	4.5; 15/16	1.5; 7/8	? 4	? 4	–	? 1/2	–	5.0
Gallup	8–11 Mar 2000	1,228	?	42.7; 173/178	33.9; 128/133	7.8; 11/13	4.3; 14/15	1.6; 6/7	0.7; 3/5	1.5; 4/5	–	0.7; 1	–	8.8
CIS	7 Mar 2000	?	78.5	43.7; 176	33.7; 123	8.7; 17	4.2; 14	1.7; 7	0.9; 3	1.3; 4	–	0.9; 1	1.2; 2	10.0
La Vanguardia	5 Mar 2000	?	?	43.2; 175/180	35.3; 128/136	–	–	–	–	–	–	–	–	7.9
Sondaxe/Diario 16	5 Mar 2000	12,001	?	42.1; 163/170	37.4; 136/143	8.1; 11/14	4.3; 13/15	1.6; 7	1.1; 3/4	1.4; 3/5	–	1.1; 0/1	? 1/2	4.7
La Vanguardia	3 Mar 2000	?	?	45.7; 183/185	33.2; 123/128	6.7 ?	4.2 ?	1.6 ?	0.6 ?	1.1 ?	–	0.9 ?	1.1 ?	12.5
Demoscopia/El País	25 Feb–2 Mar 2000	15,000	74	41.7; 165/171	37.1; 131/139	7.3; 9/13	4.1; 14/15	1.4; 6/7	1.0; 4	1.3; 4/5	–	1.0; 1/2	0.9; 1	4.6
Vox Pública/El Periódico	28 Feb–1 Mar 2000	2,300	?	44.5	33.7	6.2	4.4	1.5	1.0	1.8	–	–	–	10.8
Vox Pública/El Periódico	28 Feb–1 Mar 2000	2,300	65–70	41.7; 165/170	37.6; 135/140	7.5; 9/12	4.2; 13/14	1.6; 7/8	1.2; 4/5	1.7; 4/5	–	0.9; 1	–	4.1
Metra Seis/Colpisa	21 Feb–1 Mar 2000	2,500	74–76	41.5; 162/170	36.7; 132/142	8.0; 12/13	4.4; 15/16	1.4; 7	1.0; 4/5	1.3; 4/5	–	0.7; 1	–	4.8
Ipsos–Eco/ABC	25–29 Feb 2000	15,600	74.4	40.5; 158/164	36.7; 138/144	7.3; 9/12	4.3; 15/16	1.4; 6/7	1.0; 4	1.2; 3/5	–	0.8; 1	0.6; 1	3.6
Sigma Dos/El Mundo	21–29 Feb 2000	12,000	?	41.9; 164/170	37.3; 137/143	6.5; 9/11	4.5; 16	1.7; 6/7	0.9; 4/5	1.3; 3/5	–	0.8; 1	–	4.6
Opina/La Vanguardia	24–28 Feb 2000	3,000	?	41.8; 166/170	37.2; 136/140	8.0; 12/14	4.2; 14/15	1.3; 6	1.0; 4	1.0; 3	–	1.0; 1/2	0.6; 0/1	4.6
CIS	11–28 Feb 2000	24,040	72.0	41.6; 163/168	36.6; 138/143	7.4; 9/11	4.1; 14/15	1.3; 7	0.8; 3/4	1.1; 4/5	–	0.9; 1	0.7; 1/2	5.0
Gallup	7–28 Feb 2000	2,029	73.8	42.4	37.4	6.9	4.2	1.5	–	–	–	–	–	5.0
Sondaxe/Diario 16	27 Feb 2000	5,455	?	42.2	36.4	9.1	5.1	1.6	0.8	1.3	–	–	–	5.8
Ipsos–Eco/ABC	11–15 Feb 2000	2,232	?	41.8	38.2	7.3	4.5	1.4	–	1.1	–	–	–	3.6
Demoscopia/El País	13 Feb 2000	2,000	74–76	41.6	37.3	7.5	4.4	1.4	–	1.1	–	–	–	4.3
Vox Pública/El Periódico	5–8 Feb 2000	2,300	?	46.3	32.3	7.1	3.7	1.6	0.7	1.2	–	–	–	14.0
Vox Pública/El Periódico	5–8 Feb 2000	2,300	65–70	42.6	36.6	7.5	4.2	1.9	–	–	–	–	–	6.0
Sigma Dos/El Mundo	6 Feb 2000	?	?	42.9	36.2	7.8	4.4	1.3	–	–	–	–	–	6.7
La Vanguardia	30 Jan 2000	?	?	44.7; 180/182	35.1; 126/131	–	–	–	–	–	–	–	–	9.6
Opina/La Vanguardia	22–25 Jan 2000	3,000	? (Note: PSOE–IU alliance hypothesis.)	42.0; 157/160	40.0; 145/148	8.0; 15/16	4.0; 14	1.2; 4/5	1.0; 4/5	0.8; 3	–	0.8; 0/1	0.5; 0	2.0
Opina/La Vanguardia	22–25 Jan 2000	3,000	?	42.5; 164/168	37.0; 138/143	7.5; 14/15	4.3; 14/15	1.3; 5	1.5; 5	1.3; 3/4	–	1.0; 1	0.8; 0/1	5.5
Gallup	3–24 Jan 2000	?	?	40.7	37.1	7.0	4.1	1.4	–	–	–	–	–	3.6
Vox Pública/El Periódico	11–18 Jan 2000	2,300	?	45.0	33.3	5.8	4.3	1.2	0.7	1.3	–	–	–	11.7
Vox Pública/El Periódico	11–18 Jan 2000	2,300	65–70	43.0	38.0	6.5	4.2	1.3	–	–	–	–	–	5.0
Sigma Dos/El Mundo	23–30 Dec 1999	12,000	?	42.5; 167/174	36.8; 137/144	6.3; 9/10	4.4; 15/16	1.4; 6	0.9; 3/5	1.2; 3	–	0.6; 1	–	5.7
Gallup	9–24 Dec 1999	?	?	38.6	38.2	6.8	4.5	1.2	–	–	–	–	–	0.4
Demoscopia/El País	15–22 Dec 1999	?	73	40.9	36.5	6.7	4.1	1.5	–	1.4	–	–	–	4.4
Sondaxe/Diario 16	5 Dec 1999	2,500	?	43.8	36.8	7.9	4.0	2.0	–	–	–	–	–	7.0
Gallup	8–29 Nov 1999	2,001	?	39.0	38.4	6.3	4.2	1.3	–	–	–	–	–	0.6
La Vanguardia	28 Nov 1999	?	?	42.2; 175/179	34.2; 128/135	–	–	–	–	–	–	–	–	8.0
La Vanguardia	25 Nov 1999	?	?	41.1; 175/176	34.1; 130/135	5.6 ?	4.3 ?	1.4 ?	0.6 ?	1.0 ?	1.0 ?	1.3 ?	0.6 ?	7.0
Opina/La Vanguardia	19–22 Nov 1999	3,000	?	41.5; 163/167	36.0; 132/140	8.0; 13/15	4.0; 14/15	1.5; 5/6	1.5; 5	1.5; 3/4	0.5; 1/2	1.0; 1	1.0; 1	5.5
CIS	22–26 Oct 1999	2,496	?	40.6; 167	35.8; 139	6.8 ?	4.5 ?	1.2 ?	–	–	–	–	–	4.8
Intercampo/GETS	22 Sep–7 Oct 1999	?	?	41.0	36.5	10.3	4.4	1.2	–	–	–	–	–	4.5
Metra Seis/Colpisa	27 Sep–1 Oct 1999	1,680	?	41.8; 164/170	36.8; 136/142	7.4; 11/13	4.5; 14/16	1.2; 5	–	–	–	–	–	5.0
Sigma Dos/El Mundo	28–30 Sep 1999	1,000	?	42.2; 165/170	37.0; 135/140	7.1 ?	4.5 ?	1.3 ?	–	–	–	–	–	5.2
Gallup	2–27 Sep 1999	2,029	77.2	40.7	37.2	9.8	4.3	1.0	–	–	–	–	–	3.5
Demoscopia/El País	13–15 Sep 1999	1,809	75	40.8	36.7	7.0	4.8	1.3	–	1.6	–	–	–	4.1
Eco Consulting/ABC	9–10 Sep 1999	1,000	?	41.4	35.8	8.8	4.3	1.5	–	1.4	–	–	–	5.6
La Vanguardia	26 Aug 1999	?	?	41.8; 175/176	34.7; 130/135	5.8 ?	3.9 ?	1.3 ?	1.1 ?	1.6 ?	0.9 ?	1.3 ?	1.3 ?	7.1
CIS	9–15 Jul 1999	2,490	?	40.7; 169	35.8; 140	6.6 ?	4.6 ?	1.2 ?	–	–	–	–	–	4.9
DYM/El Periódico	5–12 Jul 1999	2,534	69.3	41.8	37.1	7.2	4.9	1.1	–	–	0.7	0.8	1.0	4.7
Gallup	9–21 Jun 1999	?	?	40.1	38.1	9.5	4.0	1.2	–	–	–	–	–	2.0
1999 EP election	13 Jun 1999	—N/a	63.0	39.7; 162	35.3; 135	5.8; 9	4.0; 17	1.9; 7	1.3; 5	1.6; 5	1.3; 4	0.8; 1	0.7; 2	4.4
1999 local elections	13 Jun 1999	—N/a	64.0	34.4	34.3	6.5	3.6	1.3	1.3	1.4	1.3	1.1	1.1	0.1
Demoscopia/El País	26 May–1 Jun 1999	17,500	?	41.5	37.0	7.7	4.4	–	–	–	–	–	–	4.5
Metra Seis/Colpisa	14–20 May 1999	1,200	?	41.7; 168/176	35.3; 127/133	8.8; 15/18	4.7; 16	1.2; 5	–	–	–	–	–	6.4
CIS	24–28 Apr 1999	2,499	?	41.0; 169	35.9; 138	8.9 ?	4.6 ?	1.3 ?	–	–	–	–	–	5.1
DYM/El Periódico	9–16 Apr 1999	3,019	65.3	42.9	34.1	10.1	4.6	1.5	–	–	0.3	0.9	0.9	8.8
Demoscopia/El País	12–14 Apr 1999	1,200	?	41.1	31.6	8.1	5.4	–	–	–	–	–	–	9.5
Metra Seis/Colpisa	18–22 Feb 1999	1,200	?	42.5; 169/176	35.7; 130/137	7.6; 12/14	4.6; 15/16	1.3; 5/7	–	–	–	–	–	6.8
Eco Consulting/ABC	18–20 Feb 1999	1,500	?	42.1	35.0	10.0	4.5	1.5	–	1.2	–	–	–	7.1
La Vanguardia	31 Jan 1999	?	?	41.5; 170/171	35.9; 136/140	–	–	–	–	–	–	–	–	5.6
CIS	27–31 Jan 1999	2,493	?	41.1; 167/175	35.4; 127/136	9.2; 14/16	4.5; 15/16	1.3; 5/6	–	–	–	–	–	5.7
Opina/La Vanguardia	21–23 Jan 1999	1,000	?	42.0; 166/174	37.0; 133/141	7.5; 12/13	4.4; 15/16	0.8; 3/5	–	–	–	0.8 ?	1.5 ?	5.0
DYM/El Periódico	11–16 Jan 1999	2,513	67.9	42.6	33.9	8.5	4.5	1.1	0.9	1.6	0.8	0.7	0.8	8.7
Sigma Dos/El Mundo	26–27 Dec 1998	1,000	?	42.9	36.1	7.7	4.5	1.3	–	–	–	–	–	6.8
Gallup	9–21 Dec 1998	2,017	?	40.6	36.4	9.9	4.7	1.4	–	–	–	–	–	4.2
Metra Seis/Colpisa	9–14 Dec 1998	1,200	?	42.0; 167/174	36.8; 133/140	8.2; 12/15	4.4; 14/16	1.2; 5	–	–	–	–	–	5.2
Eco Consulting/ABC	17–18 Nov 1998	1,001	?	40.6	36.5	9.8	4.5	1.7	–	1.0	–	–	–	4.1
Opina/La Vanguardia	13–14 Nov 1998	1,000	?	41.5; 166/173	37.5; 135/143	6.5; 9	4.8; 15/17	0.8; 5	–	–	–	0.8 ?	1.0 ?	4.0
La Vanguardia	1 Nov 1998	?	?	41.3; 171/173	34.7; 131/133	7.1; 12	4.6; 16	1.4; 6	–	–	0.9; 3	–	–	6.6
La Vanguardia	1 Nov 1998	?	?	40.1; 172/174	32.8; 128/131	7.1; 13	4.6; 17	1.4; 6	–	–	0.9; 3	–	–	7.3
La Vanguardia	1 Nov 1998	?	?	42.5; 169/172	36.7; 134/136	7.1; 11/12	4.6; 15/16	1.4; 6	–	–	0.9; 2/3	–	–	5.8
CIS	26–31 Oct 1998	2,490	77.1	40.9; 165	36.6; 140	9.1 ?	4.2 ?	1.3 ?	–	–	–	–	–	4.3
Intercampo/GETS	23 Sep–8 Oct 1998	?	?	38.3	39.8	8.9	4.8	1.5	–	–	–	–	–	1.5
Vox Pública/El Periódico	28 Sep–3 Oct 1998	1,992	66–70	38.1	38.1	10.7	4.2	1.2	–	–	–	0.6	(Note: Within IU.)	Tie
Demoscopia/El País	28–30 Sep 1998	1,500	?	40.9	35.9	10.1	3.9	–	–	–	–	–	–	5.0
DECO/PSOE	16–30 Sep 1998	7,470	?	38.6	39.5	8.2	–	–	–	–	–	–	–	0.9
Metra Seis/Colpisa	16–21 Sep 1998	1,200	?	41.3; 163/170	37.3; 134/142	8.5; 13/16	4.4; 14/16	1.4; 5/7	–	–	–	–	–	4.0
Gallup	9–21 Sep 1998	?	?	37.6	39.4	9.6	4.8	1.4	–	–	–	–	–	1.8
Sigma Dos/El Mundo	28 Aug–3 Sep 1998	14,565	?	40.4; 164	37.8; 139	9.1; 18	4.3; 14	1.3; 6	0.7; 3	0.9; 2	0.7; 2	0.5; 0	–	2.6
CIS	9–13 Jul 1998	2,486	?	38.4; 156	37.9; 147	9.3 ?	4.5 ?	1.3 ?	–	–	–	–	–	0.5
Demoscopia/El País	5–8 Jul 1998	1,200	?	37.9	35.8	8.8	4.2	–	–	–	–	–	–	2.1
Vox Pública/El Periódico	15–17 Jun 1998	1,992	66.3	38.5	37.6	9.3	4.3	1.8	–	–	–	0.6		0.9
Gallup	13–25 May 1998	?	?	37.8	40.6	8.6	4.2	1.3	–	–	–	–	–	2.8
ASEP (Note: Undecided and/or abstentionists excluded.)	18–22 May 1998	1,205	75.0	40.1	36.8	9.3	–	–	–	–	–	–	–	3.3
Opina/La Vanguardia	13 May 1998	1,000	?	40.0; 163/165	38.0; 142/143	7.0; 10/11	5.0; 17	1.0; 5	–	–	–	0.8 ?	1.0 ?	2.0
Demoscopia/El País	4–6 May 1998	1,200	?	36.6	38.2	7.3	4.6	1.3	–	–	–	–	–	1.6
La Vanguardia	2 May 1998	?	?	38.8; 152/154	39.4; 149/150	8.7; 14/15	–	–	–	–	–	–	–	0.6
Vox Pública/El Periódico	27–29 Apr 1998	1,200	61–67	36.2	39.4	9.4	3.7	2.2	–	–	–	0.4	–	3.2
CIS	25–29 Apr 1998	2,498	?	37.1; 149/151	38.9; 152/155	9.0; 14/15	4.9; 16	1.3; 5	–	–	–	–	–	1.8
Sigma Dos/El Mundo	25–27 Apr 1998	1,000	?	40.3	38.6	8.4	4.5	1.2	–	–	–	–	–	1.7
ASEP	20–24 Apr 1998	1,204	?	36.2	38.9	–	–	–	–	–	–	–	–	2.7
Metra Seis/Colpisa	13–15 Apr 1998	1,200	?	41.2; 163/168	37.5; 136/142	8.5; 13/16	4.5; 15/16	1.3; 5/6	–	–	–	–	–	3.7
Gallup	11–23 Mar 1998	?	?	38.3	38.3	9.4	4.6	1.2	–	–	–	–	–	Tie
ASEP	16–20 Mar 1998	1,209	?	38.5	37.3	–	–	–	–	–	–	–	–	1.2
DECO/PSOE	19 Mar 1998	2,000	?	38.0	39.0	–	–	–	–	–	–	–	–	1.0
DECO/PSOE	23 Feb 1998	2,000	?	40.1	38.3	–	–	–	–	–	–	–	–	1.8
ASEP	16–20 Feb 1998	1,213	?	39.0	36.0	–	–	–	–	–	–	–	–	3.0
CIS	23–27 Jan 1998	2,496	76.6	40.5; 164	36.4; 138	9.3 ?	4.5 ?	1.3 ?	–	–	–	–	–	4.1
Opina/La Vanguardia	23–24 Jan 1998	1,000	?	41.0	36.0	6.5	4.8	1.0	–	–	–	0.8	2.0	5.0
ASEP	19–23 Jan 1998	1,209	?	41.0	34.6	–	–	–	–	–	–	–	–	6.4
Metra Seis/Colpisa	12–14 Jan 1998	1,200	?	41.8; 166/172	36.5; 133/138	8.6; 13/16	4.8; 16/17	1.5; 5/7	–	–	–	–	–	5.3
Sigma Dos/El Mundo	27–28 Dec 1997	1,000	?	42.1	36.4	8.5	4.4	1.3	–	–	–	–	–	5.7
Gallup	10–22 Dec 1997	?	?	39.8	36.8	8.8	4.7	1.2	–	–	–	–	–	3.0
ASEP	9–13 Dec 1997	1,204	?	41.2	34.5	–	–	–	–	–	–	–	–	6.7
Opina/La Vanguardia	4–5 Dec 1997	1,000	?	40.0	37.0	6.5	4.6	0.8	–	–	–	0.8	2.0	3.0
Demoscopia/El País	30 Nov 1997	?	?	40.8	34.7	8.8	3.2	1.3	–	–	–	–	–	6.1
La Vanguardia	23 Nov 1997	?	?	39.6; 169/171	34.2; 133/136	7.1; 12	4.6; 16	–	–	–	–	–	–	5.4
ASEP	10–15 Nov 1997	1,211	?	38.0	37.7	–	–	–	–	–	–	–	–	0.3
CIS	24–28 Oct 1997	2,496	76.8	39.6; 163	36.4; 140	9.0 ?	4.6 ?	1.2 ?	–	–	–	–	–	3.2
ASEP	13–18 Oct 1997	1,214	?	39.5	36.6	–	–	–	–	–	–	–	–	2.9
Sigma Dos/El Mundo	6–9 Oct 1997	1,000	?	40.5	37.4	9.1	4.5	1.5	–	–	–	–	–	3.1
Intercampo/GETS	24 Sep–9 Oct 1997	?	?	38.9	38.0	8.9	5.4	1.3	–	–	–	–	–	0.9
DECO/PSOE	29 Sep–3 Oct 1997	?	?	38.5	37.7	9.3	–	–	–	–	–	–	–	0.8
Demoscopia/El País	1 Oct 1997	?	?	41.0	34.7	8.7	3.2	1.2	–	–	–	–	–	6.3
Gallup	10–22 Sep 1997	?	?	39.0	38.6	8.9	5.0	1.2	–	–	–	–	–	0.4
Opina/La Vanguardia	19–21 Sep 1997	1,000	?	40.0	38.5	8.5	5.2	1.0	–	–	–	0.5	–	1.5
ASEP	15–20 Sep 1997	1,218	?	40.8	35.8	–	–	–	–	–	–	–	–	5.0
Metra Seis/Colpisa	12–15 Sep 1997	1,000	?	41.0; 163/167	37.2; 136/140	9.0; 14/17	4.8; 16/17	1.5; 6/7	–	–	–	–	–	3.8
Sigma Dos/El Mundo	16–17 Jul 1997	1,000	?	40.9	37.0	9.7	4.7	1.5	–	–	–	–	–	3.9
CIS	11–15 Jul 1997	2,495	78.5	40.3; 162	38.2; 142	9.4 ?	4.3 ?	1.4 ?	–	–	–	–	–	2.1
ASEP	7–11 Jul 1997	1,214	?	39.6	36.4	–	–	–	–	–	–	–	–	3.2
Demoscopia/El País	7–9 Jul 1997	1,200	?	38.1	36.4	10.5	4.3	1.3	–	–	–	–	–	1.7
DECO/PSOE	6 Jul 1997	?	?	40.5	37.6	–	–	–	–	–	–	–	–	2.9
Gallup	11–23 Jun 1997	?	?	40.1	37.7	10.3	4.5	1.4	–	–	–	–	–	2.4
Opina/La Vanguardia	14–16 Jun 1997	1,000	?	40.0	38.0	10.5	5.0	1.0	–	–	–	0.5	–	2.0
ASEP	9–14 Jun 1997	1,220	?	36.6	38.6	–	–	–	–	–	–	–	–	2.0
Sigma Dos/El Mundo	11–13 Jun 1997	1,000	?	39.5	37.4	10.3	4.6	1.4	–	–	–	–	–	2.1
Vox Pública/El Periódico	20–22 May 1997	800	?	40.0	35.9	10.9	3.6	1.1	–	–	–	–	–	4.1
Opina/La Vanguardia	19–20 May 1997	1,000	?	39.5	38.0	10.0	5.1	1.2	–	–	–	0.5	–	1.5
ASEP	12–17 May 1997	1,221	?	39.2	35.8	–	–	–	–	–	–	–	–	3.4
CIS	23–27 Apr 1997	2,496	78.3	39.2; 159	37.4; 139	10.5 ?	4.6 ?	1.2 ?	–	–	–	–	–	1.8
Opina/La Vanguardia	19–20 Apr 1997	1,000	?	38.0	39.0	10.5	5.0	1.0	–	–	–	0.5	–	1.0
Sigma Dos/El Mundo	17–18 Apr 1997	1,000	?	38.7	38.1	10.4	4.4	1.3	–	–	–	–	–	0.6
Gallup	12–24 Mar 1997	?	?	37.5	39.6	10.6	4.9	1.1	–	–	–	–	–	2.1
Opina/La Vanguardia	7–8 Mar 1997	1,000	?	38.0	38.5	10.0	5.0	1.0	–	–	–	0.5	–	0.5
Sigma Dos/El Mundo	6–7 Feb 1997	1,000	?	39.6	37.0	10.8	4.2	1.2	–	–	–	–	–	2.6
Opina/La Vanguardia	3–4 Feb 1997	1,000	?	38.4	37.4	10.0	5.0	1.0	–	–	–	1.0	–	1.0
CIS	23–27 Jan 1997	2,488	76.6	38.7; 156	38.2; 145	10.0 ?	4.5 ?	1.4 ?	–	–	–	–	–	0.5
ASEP	13–18 Jan 1997	1,212	73.4	38.0	37.6	10.4	–	–	–	–	–	–	–	0.4
Sigma Dos/El Mundo	24 Dec–2 Jan 1997	1,000	?	38.2	39.1	10.4	4.3	1.3	–	–	–	–	–	0.9
Gallup	11–26 Dec 1996	?	?	35.9	39.9	11.9	4.2	1.6	–	–	–	–	–	4.0
DECO/PSOE	25–29 Nov 1996	1,500	?	35.4	40.0	10.5	5.0	–	–	–	–	–	–	4.6
PP	26 Nov 1996	?	?	36.0	39.0	–	–	–	–	–	–	–	–	3.0
CIS	26–31 Oct 1996	2,498	77.4	36.3; 143	39.9; 154	10.5 ?	5.1 ?	1.3 ?	–	–	–	–	–	3.6
Sigma Dos/El Mundo	24–25 Oct 1996	1,000	?	37.1	38.4	11.4	4.8	1.3	–	–	–	–	–	1.3
DECO/PSOE	22 Oct 1996	1,400	?	36.1	38.7	11.4	5.0	–	–	–	–	–	–	2.6
ASEP	7–12 Oct 1996	1,212	79.1	34.4	38.8	11.5	–	–	–	–	–	–	–	4.4
Intercampo/GETS	25 Sep–10 Oct 1996	?	?	32.7	36.5	11.7	4.9	2.2	–	–	–	–	–	3.8
Opina/La Vanguardia	30 Sep–2 Oct 1996	1,066	?	37.2; 149/150	39.1; 150/151	10.3; 19/20	4.8; 16	1.4; 5	–	–	–	0.5; 1	–	1.9
Sigma Dos/El Mundo	7–8 Aug 1996	1,000	?	38.8	36.8	11.3	4.4	1.4	–	–	–	–	–	2.0
CIS	17–21 Jul 1996	2,496	79.2	38.8	37.3	11.2	4.6	1.4	–	–	–	–	–	1.5
CIS	29 May–2 Jun 1996	2,496	80.4	38.6	37.3	11.3	4.9	1.4	–	–	–	–	–	1.3
Demoscopia/El País	12 May 1996	?	?	38.9	37.5	10.6	4.6	1.3	–	–	–	–	–	1.4
1996 general election	3 Mar 1996	—N/a	77.4	38.8; 156	37.6; 141	10.5; 21	4.6; 16	1.3; 5	0.9; 4	0.9; 2	0.7; 2	0.7; 1	–	1.2

==== Voting preferences ====
The table below lists raw, unweighted voting preferences.

Polling firm/Commissioner	Fieldwork date	Sample size	PP	PSOE	IU	CiU	PNV	CC	NI/IC	Question	X mark	Lead
2000 general election (Note: Does not include non-resident citizens.)	12 Mar 2000	—N/a	31.0	23.7	3.8	2.9	1.1	0.7	0.4	—N/a	30.0	7.3
Vox Pública/El Periódico	28 Feb–1 Mar 2000	2,300	30.2	21.8	4.2	2.6	0.9	–	–	23.6	8.8	8.4
Opina/La Vanguardia	24–28 Feb 2000	3,000	29.1	23.8	–	–	–	–	–	–	–	5.3
CIS	11–28 Feb 2000	24,040	29.5	19.3	4.3	2.7	1.0	0.4	0.7	27.2	8.3	10.2
Gallup	7–28 Feb 2000	2,029	26.0	24.4	4.2	1.4	0.6	–	–	26.7	13.5	1.6
ASEP	14–19 Feb 2000	1,214	32.6	23.3	6.9	6.0*	*	–	–	16.9	7.8	9.3
Vox Pública/El Periódico	5–8 Feb 2000	2,300	34.3	21.0	3.9	2.4	0.8	–	–	19.4	10.1	13.3
CIS	27–31 Jan 2000	2,490	30.6	18.5	3.8	1.9	1.3	0.4	0.3	28.5	8.0	12.1
Opina/La Vanguardia	22–25 Jan 2000	3,000	29.8	22.4	–	–	–	–	–	–	–	7.4
Vox Pública/El Periódico	11–18 Jan 2000	2,300	33.6	22.4	3.2	2.7	0.8	–	–	20.8	9.3	11.2
ASEP	10–15 Jan 2000	1,214	31.8	26.2	6.2	4.8*	*	–	–	17.0	8.4	5.3
Demoscopia/El País	15–22 Dec 1999	?	26.3	19.6	4.6	2.3	–	–	–	31.4	9.1	6.7
ASEP	3–13 Dec 1999	1,209	29.5	27.0	5.2	5.0*	*	–	–	15.5	11.3	2.5
Opina/La Vanguardia	19–22 Nov 1999	3,000	28.0	22.2	–	–	–	–	–	–	–	5.8
ASEP	8–12 Nov 1999	1,211	27.2	26.9	4.4	5.2*	*	–	–	17.5	11.3	0.3
CIS	22–26 Oct 1999	2,496	25.8	21.4	3.5	2.7	0.9	0.4	0.4	25.8	11.5	4.4
ASEP	11–18 Oct 1999	1,213	28.0	25.5	5.6	7.0*	*	–	–	15.7	11.9	2.5
Gallup	2–27 Sep 1999	2,029	19.6	26.4	3.9	1.1	0.4	–	–	31.6	12.7	6.8
ASEP	13–17 Sep 1999	1,213	29.1	24.2	5.4	6.4*	*	–	–	18.1	9.9	4.9
Demoscopia/El País	13–15 Sep 1999	1,809	23.8	21.3	4.4	2.5	–	–	–	33.4	6.7	2.5
CIS	9–15 Jul 1999	2,490	26.7	21.5	3.7	2.5	0.8	0.7	0.8	24.5	11.6	5.2
DYM/El Periódico	5–12 Jul 1999	2,534	27.7	20.0	2.9	2.5	–	–	–	23.0	15.3	7.7
ASEP	5 Jul 1999	1,200	28.0	26.7	6.9	4.8*	*	0.8	–	16.6	8.8	1.3
1999 EP election	13 Jun 1999	—N/a	25.4	22.5	3.7	2.6	1.2	0.8	0.5	—N/a	35.7	2.9
ASEP	7–12 Jun 1999	1,223	26.7	25.8	6.3	6.1*	*	0.7	–	19.5	8.4	0.9
Demoscopia/El País	26 May–1 Jun 1999	17,500	28.5	24.9	5.0	2.8	–	–	–	25.2	6.7	3.6
ASEP	10–14 May 1999	1,213	30.0	24.5	5.0	4.8*	*	0.3	–	19.3	8.6	5.5
CIS	24–28 Apr 1999	2,499	25.5	21.0	4.5	2.8	0.7	0.4	0.6	28.8	9.1	4.5
ASEP	12–16 Apr 1999	1,214	24.9	23.7	5.5	5.7*	*	0.7	–	19.7	13.0	1.2
DYM/El Periódico	9–16 Apr 1999	3,019	24.7	14.5	4.1	1.8	0.9	–	0.4	29.5	18.9	10.2
Demoscopia/El País	12–14 Apr 1999	1,200	24.3	17.6	4.6	3.2	–	–	–	25.8	15.6	6.7
ASEP	8–12 Mar 1999	1,207	28.9	25.4	5.9	4.4*	*	0.5	–	17.4	10.3	3.5
ASEP	8–12 Feb 1999	1,218	30.7	21.3	6.0	5.8*	*	0.5	–	17.3	11.8	9.4
Demoscopia/El País	1–4 Feb 1999	1,500	27.3	19.4	3.6	1.7	–	–	–	25.5	15.9	7.9
CIS	27–31 Jan 1999	2,493	26.7	20.3	4.8	2.7	1.0	0.5	0.5	27.2	10.1	6.4
Opina/La Vanguardia	21–23 Jan 1999	1,000	26.6	23.0	–	–	–	–	–	–	–	3.6
DYM/El Periódico	11–16 Jan 1999	2,513	28.0	17.0	3.3	2.1	0.7	0.3	0.3	26.6	16.2	11.0
ASEP	11–15 Jan 1999	1,222	29.4	23.2	5.8	6.3*	*	0.2	–	17.0	11.6	6.2
ASEP	7–14 Dec 1998	1,224	27.9	21.8	6.3	6.1*	*	0.2	–	17.8	12.5	6.1
ASEP	9–13 Nov 1998	1,209	25.8	27.7	3.0	8.3*	*	–	–	22.1	8.8	1.9
CIS	26–31 Oct 1998	2,490	26.1	22.9	4.6	2.0	0.8	0.4	0.4	26.4	10.2	3.2
ASEP	13–19 Oct 1998	1,214	26.1	27.5	5.3	5.1*	*	0.2	–	18.2	9.8	1.4
Vox Pública/El Periódico	28 Sep–3 Oct 1998	1,992	24.0	22.7	6.2	2.6	0.6	–	–	30.3	7.8	1.3
Demoscopia/El País	28–30 Sep 1998	1,500	24.9	21.2	6.2	2.2	–	–	–	20.9	16.0	3.7
ASEP	14–18 Sep 1998	1,221	22.7	26.9	4.7	4.8*	*	0.2	–	21.8	12.2	4.2
ASEP	13–17 Jul 1998	1,216	23.3	27.4	5.6	4.8*	*	0.2	–	20.5	13.2	4.1
CIS	9–13 Jul 1998	2,486	23.9	23.8	5.1	2.5	0.5	0.6	0.6	26.2	9.9	0.1
Demoscopia/El País	5–8 Jul 1998	1,200	22.7	21.3	5.2	2.3	–	–	–	22.8	17.5	1.4
ASEP	15–19 Jun 1998	1,222	23.7	24.7	7.1	4.3*	*	0.2	–	21.4	11.0	1.0
Vox Pública/El Periódico	15–17 Jun 1998	1,992	24.4	23.2	5.5	2.2	1.1	–	–	28.4	9.2	1.2
ASEP	18–22 May 1998	1,205	27.5	25.6	6.1	4.5*	*	0.4	–	20.8	9.1	1.9
Demoscopia/El País	4–6 May 1998	1,200	23.3	24.8	4.6	3.7	–	–	–	21.5	13.7	1.5
Vox Pública/El Periódico	27–29 Apr 1998	1,200	22.5	24.2	5.0	2.3	1.0	–	–	29.3	9.5	1.7
CIS	25–29 Apr 1998	2,498	22.0	25.6	5.6	3.5	1.2	0.7	–	24.7	10.3	3.6
ASEP	20–24 Apr 1998	1,204	22.3	26.0	6.4	5.4*	*	0.2	–	23.6	10.7	3.7
ASEP	16–20 Mar 1998	1,209	25.5	24.8	4.3	5.1*	*	0.3	–	21.1	12.5	0.7
ASEP	16–20 Feb 1998	1,213	22.7	22.8	5.9	4.5*	*	0.4	–	22.1	12.9	0.1
CIS	23–27 Jan 1998	2,496	24.5	22.6	5.3	2.5	0.6	0.4	–	26.3	11.1	1.9
ASEP	19–23 Jan 1998	1,209	28.1	21.7	5.3	5.9*	*	0.3	–	21.5	11.9	6.4
ASEP	9–13 Dec 1997	1,204	28.3	21.8	5.1	5.1*	*	0.2	–	22.6	10.8	6.5
Demoscopia/El País	30 Nov 1997	?	25.0	20.4	5.2	1.8	–	–	–	21.6	17.8	4.6
ASEP	10–15 Nov 1997	1,211	26.5	26.8	5.3	5.1*	*	0.2	–	18.6	11.0	0.3
CIS	24–28 Oct 1997	2,496	25.2	23.6	5.2	2.8	1.0	0.4	–	21.1	12.2	1.6
ASEP	13–18 Oct 1997	1,214	26.0	23.4	5.9	4.9*	*	0.2	–	22.2	11.5	2.6
DECO/PSOE	29 Sep–3 Oct 1997	?	29.2	26.7	5.8	–	–	–	–	–	–	2.5
ASEP	15–20 Sep 1997	1,218	29.1	24.4	5.5	6.1*	*	0.4	–	18.2	11.0	4.7
CIS	11–15 Jul 1997	2,495	24.7	27.5	4.8	2.6	1.0	0.3	–	23.9	9.0	2.8
ASEP	7–11 Jul 1997	1,214	26.2	26.6	5.6	5.4*	*	0.2	–	19.9	9.7	0.4
Demoscopia/El País	7–9 Jul 1997	1,200	23.9	22.3	6.3	2.5	–	–	–	23.8	13.8	1.6
ASEP	9–14 Jun 1997	1,220	23.2	26.5	7.5	7.2*	*	0.4	–	18.6	11.3	3.3
Vox Pública/El Periódico	20–22 May 1997	800	29.4	25.1	5.1	2.8	–	–	–	24.0	5.5	4.3
ASEP	12–17 May 1997	1,221	25.1	24.6	6.8	6.0*	*	0.2	–	20.0	11.8	0.5
Demoscopia/El País	27 Apr 1997	?	21.0	22.5	6.3	2.8	–	–	–	23.1	17.8	1.5
CIS	23–27 Apr 1997	2,496	23.2	24.0	6.7	3.3	0.6	0.4	–	25.1	10.1	0.8
ASEP	4–19 Apr 1997	1,211	25.5	24.7	7.5	6.2*	*	–	–	19.5	9.5	0.8
ASEP	10–15 Mar 1997	1,218	24.3	27.3	6.8	5.9*	*	0.1	–	17.9	10.9	3.0
ASEP	10–15 Feb 1997	1,213	20.9	27.9	8.6	4.5*	*	0.2	–	20.2	10.4	7.0
CIS	23–27 Jan 1997	2,488	22.5	22.6	6.8	3.5	0.7	0.4	–	24.6	11.5	0.1
ASEP	13–18 Jan 1997	1,212	23.1	24.7	6.6	6.1*	*	0.7	–	19.4	12.3	1.6
Demoscopia/El País	12–15 Jan 1997	?	22.1	25.3	6.3	1.8	–	–	–	23.9	13.2	3.2
ASEP	2–7 Dec 1996	1,219	18.9	27.5	8.2	5.8*	*	0.3	–	20.3	11.6	8.6
DECO/PSOE	25–29 Nov 1996	1,500	26.0	25.2	–	–	–	–	–	–	–	0.8
PP	26 Nov 1996	?	21.0	27.0	–	–	–	–	–	–	–	6.0
ASEP	2–7 Nov 1996	1,211	19.7	30.0	8.5	5.8*	*	0.3	–	19.6	9.7	10.3
CIS	26–31 Oct 1996	2,498	21.5	27.3	7.1	3.5	0.7	0.3	–	22.9	9.8	5.8
DECO/PSOE	22 Oct 1996	?	23.7	22.9	8.5	–	–	–	–	–	–	0.8
ASEP	7–12 Oct 1996	1,212	21.1	25.6	8.2	6.2*	*	0.4	–	19.6	11.4	4.5
Demoscopia/El País	7–9 Oct 1996	?	23.2	27.8	9.3	3.5	–	–	–	15.8	12.1	4.6
CIS	17–21 Jul 1996	2,496	25.4	23.6	8.3	3.8	0.8	0.6	–	23.0	8.8	1.8
Demoscopia/El País	15–17 Jul 1996	?	30.5	24.6	9.0	–	–	–	–	–	–	5.9
ASEP	10–15 Jun 1996	1,219	25.3	28.2	7.7	5.3*	*	0.1	–	20.3	6.6	2.9
CIS	29 May–2 Jun 1996	2,496	24.6	24.9	9.0	4.6	1.2	0.6	–	23.5	6.0	0.3
ASEP	13–18 May 1996	1,212	29.3	27.4	7.7	5.9*	*	0.7	–	9.9	8.1	1.9
Demoscopia/El País	12 May 1996	?	29.7	28.8	–	–	–	–	–	–	–	0.9
ASEP	15–20 Apr 1996	1,220	25.6	29.2	9.4	6.7*	*	0.2	–	16.5	7.3	3.6
ASEP	11–16 Mar 1996	1,212	27.1	32.1	9.3	6.3*	*	0.4	–	13.6	5.4	5.0
1996 general election	3 Mar 1996	—N/a	30.2	29.1	8.2	3.6	1.0	0.7	–	—N/a	21.9	1.1
(*) Includes data for CiU, PNV, EA, CG, PRC, PAR, UPN, PA, UV, EU and CC.

==== Victory preference ====
The table below lists opinion polling on the victory preferences for each party in the event of a general election taking place.

Polling firm/Commissioner	Fieldwork date	Sample size	PP	PSOE	IU	CiU	PNV	Other/ None	Question	Lead
CIS	11–28 Feb 2000	24,040	34.4	24.9	5.0	1.9	0.9	5.7	27.2	9.5
Gallup	7–28 Feb 2000	2,029	33.0	27.0	4.0	–	–	13.0	23.0	6.0

==== Victory likelihood ====
The table below lists opinion polling on the perceived likelihood of victory for each party in the event of a general election taking place.

Polling firm/Commissioner	Fieldwork date	Sample size	PP	PSOE	Other/ None	Question	Lead
CIS	11–28 Feb 2000	24,040	63.9	10.2	2.1	23.8	53.7
Demoscopia/El País	13–15 Sep 1999	1,809	60.0	15.0	–	25.0	45.0
Demoscopia/El País	12–14 Apr 1999	1,200	65.0	12.0	–	23.0	53.0
Demoscopia/El País	1–4 Feb 1999	1,500	69.0	12.0	–	19.0	57.0
Demoscopia/El País	28–30 Sep 1998	1,500	59.0	21.0	–	20.0	38.0
Demoscopia/El País	5–8 Jul 1998	1,200	54.0	27.0	–	19.0	27.0
Demoscopia/El País	4–6 May 1998	1,200	49.0	29.0	–	22.0	20.0
