= 2000 Spanish general election =

- 12 March 2000

All 350 seats in the Congress of Deputies and 208 (of 259) seats in the Senate 176 seats needed for a majority in the Congress of Deputies
- Opinion polls
- Registered: 33,969,640 ▲4.4%
- Turnout: 23,339,490 (68.7%) ▼8.7 pp
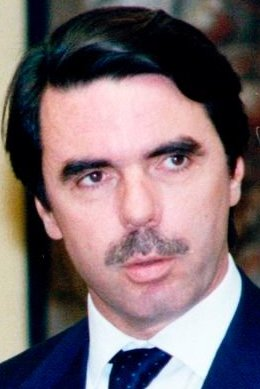

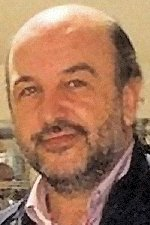

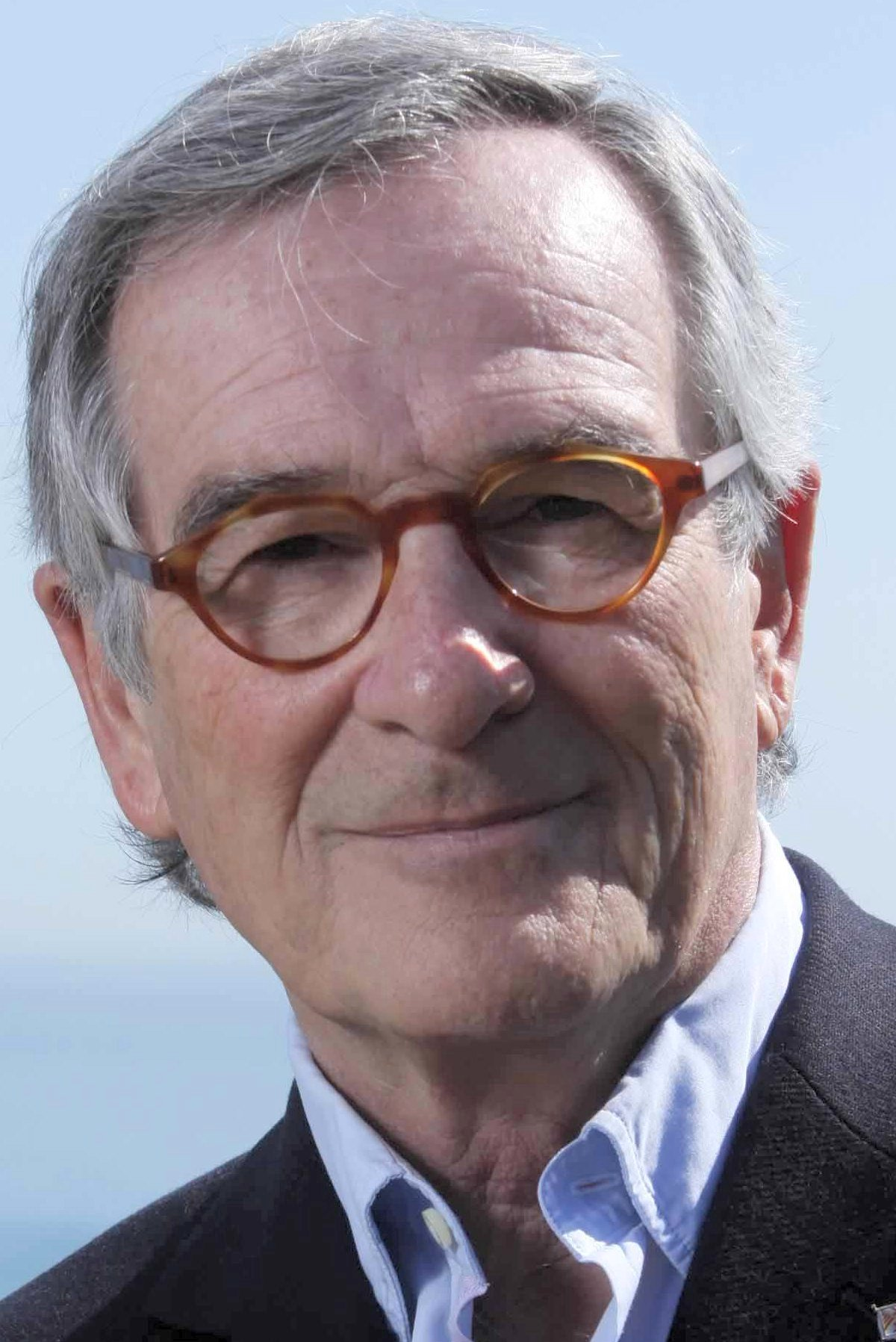

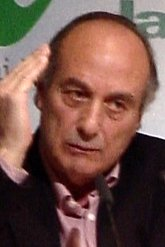

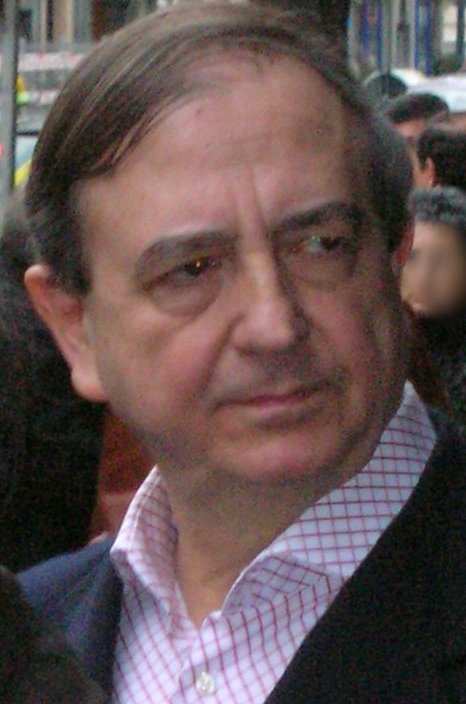

	First party	Second party	Third party
Leader	José María Aznar	Joaquín Almunia	Xavier Trias
Party	PP	PSOE–p	CiU
Leader since	2 September 1989	21 June 1997	20 August 1999
Leader's seat	Madrid	Madrid	Barcelona
Last election	156 seats, 38.8%	141 seats, 37.6%	16 seats, 4.6%
Seats won	183	125	15
Seat change	▲27	▼16	▼1
Popular vote	10,321,178	7,918,752	970,421
Percentage	44.5%	34.2%	4.2%
Swing	▲5.7 pp	▼3.4 pp	▼0.4 pp
	Fourth party	Fifth party	Sixth party
Leader	Francisco Frutos	Iñaki Anasagasti	José Carlos Mauricio
Party	IU	EAJ/PNV	CC
Leader since	7 December 1998	1986	1996
Leader's seat	Madrid	Biscay	Las Palmas
Last election	19 seats, 9.4% (Note: Results for IU in the 1996 Congress election, not including IC–EV.)	5 seats, 1.3%	4 seats, 0.9%
Seats won	8	7	4
Seat change	▼11	▲2	0
Popular vote	1,263,043	353,953	248,261
Percentage	5.4%	1.5%	1.1%
Swing	▼3.9 pp	▲0.2 pp	▲0.2 pp
Prime Minister before election
José María Aznar
PP
Prime Minister after election
José María Aznar
PP

A general election was held in Spain on 12 March 2000 to elect the members of the 7th Cortes Generales under the Spanish Constitution of 1978. All 350 seats in the Congress of Deputies were up for election, as well as 208 of 259 seats in the Senate. It was held concurrently with a regional election in Andalusia. At four years since the previous one, the 2000 election ended the longest legislative period up to that point since the Spanish transition to democracy.

The incumbent People's Party (PP) of Prime Minister José María Aznar had been able to access power (for the first time since the Spanish transition to democracy) through the Majestic Pact in 1996 with peripheral nationalist parties, namely: Convergence and Union (CiU), the Basque Nationalist Party (PNV) and Canarian Coalition (CC). In that period, Aznar's cabinet presided over an economic boom—together with a privatization of state-owned companies—a reduction in unemployment and the introduction of the euro, as well as increasing public outcry at the ETA group's terrorist activity (seeing the killings of Miguel Ángel Blanco in 1997 and Fernando Buesa days before the campaign start), and an early social response to growing immigration to Spain, with the El Ejido riots in February 2000. The opposition was divided, with the Spanish Socialist Workers' Party (PSOE) looking for stable leadership after the farewell of Felipe González at the 1997 party's congress, and a period of duumvirate between his successor, Joaquín Almunia, and prime ministerial nominee Josep Borrell (elected through primaries), until the latter's sudden resignation in May 1999. United Left (IU) descended into internal infighting and saw a number of splits, including that of Initiative for Catalonia (IC).

The election saw the PP securing an unexpected absolute majority in the Congress of Deputies, obtaining 183 out of 350 seats and increasing its margin of victory with the PSOE. A pre-election agreement between the PSOE and IU was unsuccessful, with such alliance being said to prompt tactical voting for Aznar, who also benefited from a moderate stance during his tenure. Almunia announced his resignation immediately after results were known, triggering a leadership election. Regional and peripheral nationalist parties improved their results, except for CiU—which had been in electoral decline for a decade following its support to Spanish ruling parties—and the abertzale left-supported Euskal Herritarrok (EH), which urged its voters in the Basque Country and Navarre to boycott the election. The PNV benefitted from EH's absence and gained two seats, whereas both CC and the Galician Nationalist Bloc had strong showings in their respective regions. IC clung on to parliamentary representation but suffered from the electoral competition with United and Alternative Left, IU's newly-founded regional branch in Catalonia, which failed to secure any seat. This would be the only general election in which both parties would run separately.

This marked the first of two times that the PP secured a nationwide absolute majority, its best result in both popular vote share and seats up until then (only exceeded in 2011), as well as the first time that PP results exceeded the combined totals for PSOE and IU. In contrast, the PSOE got its worst election result in 21 years. This was the second time a single party received more than 10 million votes in Spanish history, the previous one being in 1982. Voter turnout was one of the lowest for Spanish election standards up to that time, with only 68.7% of the electorate casting a vote.

== Background ==
On 5 May 1996, José María Aznar from the People's Party (PP) was able to form the first centre-right government in Spain since 1982 through confidence and supply agreements with Convergence and Union (CiU), the Basque Nationalist Party (PNV), and Canarian Coalition, in what was coined the Majestic Pact. The relationship between the PP and its parliamentary allies was a focus of political interest due to its importance to government stability, the previous animosity between the PP and peripheral nationalism (particularly CiU and PNV) and diverging stances over the degree of devolution to be awarded to autonomous communities.

The new government focused its economic efforts on meeting the Maastricht criteria by reducing inflation, public debt and budget deficit, while reactivating the private sector through orthodox economics. It debuted by approving a package of spending cuts and a freeze on civil servants' wages for 1997, followed by the liberalization of key sectors (with the approval of new laws on the telecommunications industry and the property market), and the privatization of state-owned companies (such as Telefónica, Tabacalera, Endesa and Repsol). The government also sought a deal with employers' organizations and trade unions to adopt a labour market reform that introduced incentives for open-ended contracts in exchange for reduced severance payments. This allowed Spain to join the new European single currency (the euro) in 1999.

The implementation of Aznar's economic programme saw a decrease in unemployment and the Madrid Stock Exchange reaching record highs. This buoyancy was dubbed an "economic miracle" and served as a platform for Aznar to coin the "Spain is doing well" slogan (Spanish: España va bien), though these years would see the start of a property bubble with a rapid increase in real-estate prices. This period also saw the emergence of social issues such as gender-based violence (following the murder of Ana Orantes) and euthanasia (a result of the taped suicide of Ramón Sampedro). Immigration emerged as an issue, with a government's attempt to tighten conditions for illegal immigrants backfiring after the parliamentary opposition united to pass a new Aliens Law, regarded as respectful of migrants' rights. At the international level, Spain hosted the 1997 Madrid NATO summit (focused on the alliance's enlargement) and supported the NATO bombing of Yugoslavia in the context of the Kosovo War.

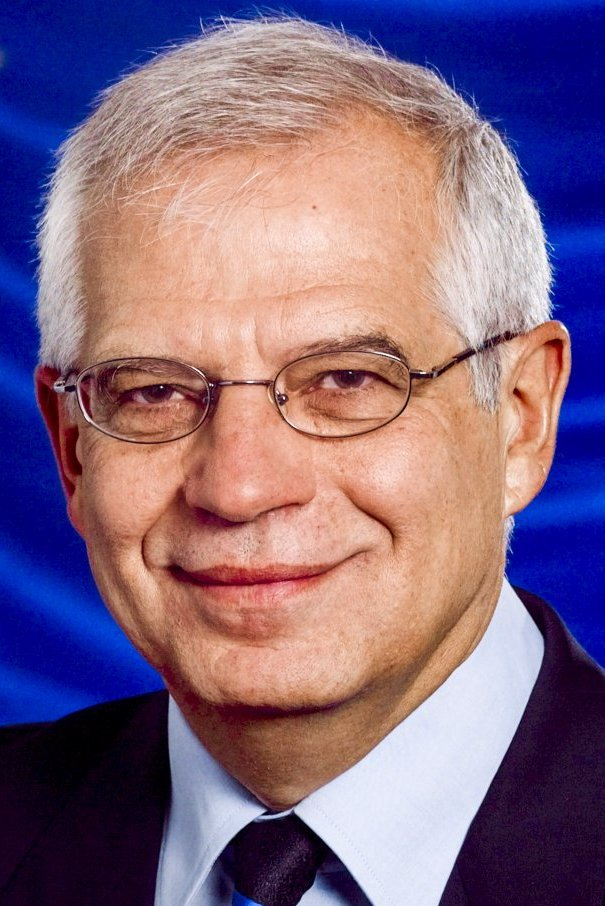
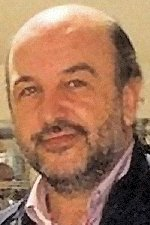
Josep Borrell (left) was elected as PSOE nominee for prime minister in April 1998, but a power struggle with party leader Joaquín Almunia (right), and a scandal affecting two former aides, led to his withdrawal one year later.

The 1996 general election had seen the Spanish Socialist Workers' Party (PSOE) being forced into opposition for the first time since 1982. Felipe González announced his intention to step down from the PSOE's leadership at the 1997 party congress to give way to generational renewal, while also rejecting a new run as prime ministerial candidate. The party, divided at the time between González's supporters (renovadores, Spanish for "renovators") and those following the discipline of PSOE deputy leader Alfonso Guerra (guerristas), elected Joaquín Almunia, a "renovator" and former labour and public administrations minister, as new party leader. A primary election in April 1998 to elect the PSOE's prime ministerial nominee saw Almunia, supported by González and prominent party "renovators", facing Josep Borrell (former public works minister), who received the backing of the guerrista faction. Borrell defeated Almunia, but the latter remained as leader in order to prevent a new party congress. This prompted a "bicephaly" (duumvirate) in which both Borrell and Almunia clashed on direction and strategy issues for months. Borrell quit as candidate in May 1999 after it transpired that two former aides were involved in a judicial investigation for tax fraud, with Almunia succeeding him without opposition.

Disappointment with election results saw United Left (IU) descend into crisis, which worsened over Julio Anguita's confrontational attitude with the PSOE. Anguita sought to prevent its Galician branch (EU–EG) from entering an electoral alliance with the Socialists ahead of the 1997 Galician election, a move criticized by Initiative for Catalonia (IC), with whom disagreements over IU's direction had been on the rise. The Democratic Party of the New Left (PDNI), constituted as an internal faction critical of Anguita's leadership, was expelled from IU's governing bodies after it broke party discipline over the issue of labour reform in June 1997. September 1997 saw the PDNI's expulsion from IU as a whole and its regional-controlled leaderships in Cantabria and Castilla–La Mancha disbanded, as well as the break up of relations with EU–EG and IC. The PDNI then sought electoral alliances with the PSOE, which materialized ahead of the 1999 local, regional and European Parliament elections. IC also entered into an alliance with PSOE's sister party in Catalonia ahead of the 1999 Catalan election. The ongoing IU crisis and health issues forced Anguita to resign from running in the next general election.

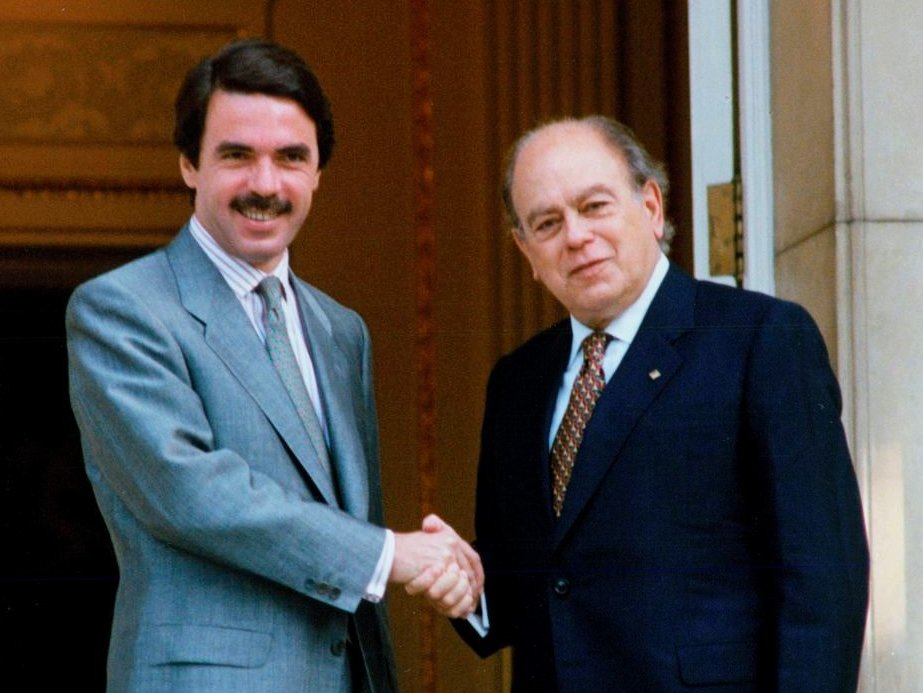
Relations between José María Aznar's People's Party (PP) and Jordi Pujol's Convergence and Union (CiU) were critical for government stability.

The Basque ETA group continued its activity, with its most relevant actions being the kidnapping of a Spanish prison officer, José Antonio Ortega Lara, and the assassination of PP's Ermua councillor Miguel Ángel Blanco in July 1997. Blanco's killing had a deep social impact throughout Spain, with more than six million people across the country taking to the streets over four days to demand an end to ETA violence—a spontaneous civic response dubbed the "Ermua spirit"—and even some of the group's supporters publicly condemned it. The signing of the Estella-Lizarra Declaration between the PNV and Herri Batasuna in September 1998, while opposed by the Spanish government, led ETA to announce an "indefinite ceasefire" four days later. Aznar authorized talks between his government and ETA, but a single meeting in Switzerland found the group no more willing to compromise on its core demands than it had been in the past; negotiations failed and ETA ended the truce in late 1999. In December 1999, the Civil Guard foiled a plot by ETA to bring 1,700 kg of explosives to Madrid to blow up the Picasso Tower ("the convoy of death").

PP and CiU frequently clashed over the degree of fulfillment of their signed commitments, with Catalan president Jordi Pujol persistently threatening to terminate his party's support to Aznar. Mutual interest, with the stability of Pujol's government in Catalonia also dependant on continued support from the PP in the regional parliament, helped ensure that the legislative term reached its end, with both parties confirming the renewal of their agreements in January 1998. As a result of the PP–CiU alliance, Aznar's government oversaw a large transfer of powers to regions—traffic police, job creation, vocational training, port management and fiscal policy (including taxes on personal income, wealth, property transfers, documented legal acts, inheritance, gifts and gambling)—the abolition of compulsory military service and the reform of the State's peripheral administration. Relations with the PNV worsened throughout the legislative term, particularly following the 1998 Estella declaration, ultimately leading the party to withdraw all support to the government in 1999. Growing political differences between the PP and the Aragonese Party saw the latter allying with the PSOE in the aftermath of the 1999 Aragonese election, and its break up from the PP's parliamentary group in October 1999.

== Overview ==
Under the 1978 Constitution, the Spanish Cortes Generales were conceived as an imperfect bicameral system. The Congress of Deputies held greater legislative power than the Senate, having the ability to grant or withdraw confidence from a prime minister and to override Senate vetoes by an absolute majority. Nonetheless, the Senate retained a limited number of specific functions—such as ratifying international treaties, authorizing cooperation agreements between autonomous communities, enforcing direct rule, regulating interterritorial compensation funds, and taking part in constitutional amendments and in the appointment of members to the Constitutional Court and the General Council of the Judiciary—which were not subject to override by Congress.

=== Date ===
The term of each chamber of the Cortes Generales—the Congress and the Senate—expired four years from the date of their previous election, unless they were dissolved earlier. The election decree was required to be issued no later than 25 days before the scheduled expiration date of parliament and published on the following day in the Official State Gazette (BOE), with election day taking place 54 days after the decree's publication. The previous election was held on 3 March 1996, which meant that the chambers' terms would have expired on 3 March 2000. The election decree was required to be published in the BOE no later than 8 February 2000, setting the latest possible date for election day on 2 April 2000.

The prime minister had the prerogative to propose the monarch to dissolve both chambers at any given time—either jointly or separately—and call a snap election, provided that no motion of no confidence was in process, no state of emergency was in force and that dissolution did not occur before one year after a previous one. Additionally, both chambers were to be dissolved and a new election called if an investiture process failed to elect a prime minister within a two-month period from the first ballot. Barring this exception, there was no constitutional requirement for simultaneous elections to the Congress and the Senate. Still, as of 2026, there has been no precedent of separate elections taking place under the 1978 Constitution.

As part of the PP–CiU agreement, Pujol required Aznar to give him early notice of any snap general election, while warning about his capability (rejected by Aznar) to force one at any given time. Aznar offered to coordinate both the general and Catalan elections with Pujol in 1999, though this did not ultimately materialize. Speculation emerged on a snap election either after the introduction of the euro was effective at 1 January 1999, or concurrently with the scheduled June 1999 local, regional and European Parliament elections, fueled by some Pujol's remarks (which he later backtracked) at a critical point in the PP–CiU relationship. Aznar himself repeteadly rejected these claims. The summer of 1999 saw new speculations of an early election in the fall, with Aznar reasserting his will to serve out the remainder of the legislative term until March 2000. On 23 December 1999, he confirmed the general election for 12 March, together with the 2000 Andalusian regional election.

The Cortes Generales were officially dissolved on 18 January 2000 with the publication of the corresponding decree in the BOE, setting election day for 12 March and scheduling for both chambers to reconvene on 5 April.

=== Electoral system ===
Voting for each chamber of the Cortes Generales was based on universal suffrage, comprising all Spanish nationals over 18 years of age with full political rights, provided that they had not been deprived of the right to vote by a final sentence, nor were legally incapacitated.

The Congress of Deputies had a minimum of 300 and a maximum of 400 seats, with electoral provisions fixing its size at 350. Of these, 348 were elected in 50 multi-member constituencies corresponding to the provinces of Spain—each of which was assigned an initial minimum of two seats and the remaining 248 distributed in proportion to population—using the D'Hondt method and closed-list proportional voting, with a three percent-threshold of valid votes (including blank ballots) in each constituency. The remaining two seats were allocated to Ceuta and Melilla as single-member districts elected by plurality voting. The use of this electoral method resulted in a higher effective threshold depending on district magnitude and vote distribution.

As a result of the aforementioned allocation, each Congress multi-member constituency was entitled the following seats:

Seats	Constituencies (Note: The province of Balearics was officially renamed as "Balearic Islands" on 27 April 1997. The provinces of La Coruña and Orense were officially renamed as "A Coruña" and "Ourense" on 4 April 1998.)
34	Madrid
31	Barcelona
16	Valencia
13	Seville
11	Alicante
10	Málaga
9	A Coruña, Asturias, Biscay, Cádiz, Murcia
8	Pontevedra
7	Balearic Islands, Córdoba, Granada, Las Palmas, Santa Cruz de Tenerife, Zaragoza
6	Badajoz, Guipúzcoa, Jaén, Tarragona
5	Almería, Cáceres, Cantabria, Castellón, Ciudad Real, Girona, Huelva, León, Navarre, Toledo, Valladolid
4	Álava, Albacete, Burgos, La Rioja, Lleida, Lugo, Ourense, Salamanca
3	Ávila, Cuenca, Guadalajara, Huesca, Palencia, Segovia, Soria, Teruel, Zamora

208 Senate seats were elected using open-list (Note: Parties could group candidates into lists, although each candidate was treated separately for the purpose of the voting procedure.) partial block voting: voters in constituencies electing four seats could choose up to three candidates; in those with two or three seats, up to two; and in single-member districts, one. Each of the 47 peninsular provinces was allocated four seats, while in insular provinces—such as the Balearic and Canary Islands—the districts were the islands themselves, with the larger ones (Mallorca, Gran Canaria and Tenerife) being allocated three seats each, and the smaller ones (Menorca, Ibiza–Formentera, Fuerteventura, La Gomera, El Hierro, Lanzarote and La Palma) one each. Ceuta and Melilla elected two seats each. Additionally, autonomous communities could appoint at least one senator each and were entitled to one additional seat per million inhabitants.

The law did not provide for by-elections to fill vacant seats; instead, any vacancies arising after the proclamation of candidates and during the legislative term were filled by the next candidates on the party lists or, when required, by designated substitutes.

=== Outgoing parliament ===
The tables below show the composition of the parliamentary groups in both chambers at the time of dissolution.

Parliamentary composition in January 2000
Congress of Deputies
Groups	Parties	Deputies	
Groups	Parties	Seats	Total
People's Parliamentary Group in the Congress	PP	153	155
People's Parliamentary Group in the Congress	UPN	2	155
Socialist Group of the Congress	PSOE	122	141
Socialist Group of the Congress	PSC	19	141
United Left's Federal Parliamentary Group	IU	16	16
Catalan Parliamentary Group (Convergence and Union)	CDC	10	16
Catalan Parliamentary Group (Convergence and Union)	UDC	6	16
Basque Parliamentary Group (EAJ/PNV)	EAJ/PNV	5	5
Canarian Coalition's Parliamentary Group	AIC	2	4
Canarian Coalition's Parliamentary Group	ICAN	1	4
Canarian Coalition's Parliamentary Group	CCN	1	4
Mixed Parliamentary Group	PDNI	3	11
Mixed Parliamentary Group	BNG	2	11
Mixed Parliamentary Group	IC–V	2	11
Mixed Parliamentary Group	EA	1	11
Mixed Parliamentary Group	UV	1	11
Mixed Parliamentary Group	PAR	1	11
Mixed Parliamentary Group	PI	1	11
Non-Inscrits	HB	2 (Note: All elected HB members were deprived from their rights and prerogatives in May 1996, based on them having neither attended any parliamentary session nor sworn an oath to the Constitution.)	2

Parliamentary composition in January 2000
Senate
Groups	Parties	Senators	
Groups	Parties	Seats	Total
People's Parliamentary Group in the Senate	PP	129	132
People's Parliamentary Group in the Senate	UPN	3	132
Socialist Parliamentary Group	PSOE	90	100
Socialist Parliamentary Group	PSC	10	100
Convergence and Union's; Catalan Parliamentary Group in the Senate	CDC	8	11
Convergence and Union's; Catalan Parliamentary Group in the Senate	UDC	3	11
Basque Nationalist Senators' Parliamentary Group	EAJ/PNV	6	6
Mixed Parliamentary Group	PAR	3	10
Mixed Parliamentary Group	IU	2	10
Mixed Parliamentary Group	AIC	1	10
Mixed Parliamentary Group	AHI	1	10
Mixed Parliamentary Group	ERC	1	10
Mixed Parliamentary Group	Pacte	1	10
Mixed Parliamentary Group	PIL	1	10

== Candidates ==
=== Nomination rules ===
Spanish citizens with the right to vote could run for election, provided that they had not been criminally imprisoned by a final sentence or convicted—whether final or not—of offences that involved loss of eligibility or disqualification from public office (such as rebellion or terrorism, when involving crimes against life, physical integrity or personal freedom). Additional causes of ineligibility applied to the following officials:

- Members of the Spanish royal family and their spouses;
- Holders of a number of senior public or institutional posts, including the heads and members of higher courts and state institutions; (Note: These comprised the Constitutional Court, the General Council of the Judiciary, the Supreme Court, the Council of State, the Court of Auditors and the Economic and Social Council.) the Ombudsman; the State's Attorney General; high-ranking officials of government departments, the Office of the Prime Minister and other state agencies; government delegates in the autonomous communities; the director-general of RTVE; the director of the Electoral Register Office; the governor and deputy governor of the Bank of Spain; the heads of official credit institutions; and members of electoral commissions and of the Nuclear Safety Council;
- Heads of diplomatic missions abroad;
- Judges and public prosecutors in active service;
- Members of the Armed Forces and law enforcement bodies in active service.

Other ineligibility provisions also applied to a number of territorial officials in these categories within their areas of jurisdiction, as well as to employees of foreign states and members of regional governments.

Incompatibility rules included those of ineligibility, and also barred running in multiple constituencies or lists, and combining legislative roles (deputy, senator, and regional lawmaker) with each other or with:

- A number of senior public or institutional posts, including the presidency of the Competition Defence Court; and leadership positions in RTVE, government offices, public authorities (such as port authorities, hydrographic confederations, or highway concessionary companies), public entities and state-owned or publicly funded companies;
- Any other paid public or private position, except university teaching.

=== Parties and lists ===
The electoral law allowed for parties and federations registered in the interior ministry, alliances and groupings of electors to present lists of candidates. Parties and federations intending to form an alliance were required to inform the relevant electoral commission within 10 days of the election call, whereas groupings of electors needed to secure the signature of at least one percent of the electorate in the constituencies for which they sought election, disallowing electors from signing for more than one list.

Below is a list of the main parties and alliances which contested the election:

Candidacy	Parties and alliances	Leading candidate	Ideology	Previous result				Gov.	Ref.
Candidacy	Parties and alliances	Leading candidate	Ideology	Congress		Senate		Gov.	Ref.
Candidacy	Parties and alliances	Leading candidate	Ideology	Vote %	Seats	Vote %	Seats	Gov.	Ref.
PP	List: People's Party (PP); Navarrese People's Union (UPN); Melillan People's Union (UPM)	José María Aznar	Conservatism; Christian democracy	38.8%	156	39.0%	112	Yes	
PSOE–p	List: Spanish Socialist Workers' Party (PSOE); Socialists' Party of Catalonia (PSC); Democratic Party of the New Left (PDNI)	Joaquín Almunia	Social democracy	37.6%	141	31.7% (Note: Results in the 1996 Senate election, not including Catalonia.)	73	No	
IU	List: United Left (IU) – Communist Party of Spain (PCE) – Socialist Action Party (PASOC) – Republican Left (IR) – Collective for the Unity of Workers–Andalusian Left Bloc (CUT–BAI) – Revolutionary Workers' Party (POR) – Workers' Revolutionary Party (PRT); United and Alternative Left (EUiA) – Living Unified Socialist Party of Catalonia (PSUCviu) – Party of the Communists of Catalonia (PCC) – The Greens–Ecologist Confederation of Catalonia (EV–CEC)	Francisco Frutos	Socialism; Communism	9.4%	19	8.8%	0	No	
CiU	List: Democratic Convergence of Catalonia (CDC); Democratic Union of Catalonia (UDC)	Xavier Trias	Catalan nationalism Centrism	4.6%	16	4.9%	8	No	
EAJ/PNV	List: Basque Nationalist Party (EAJ/PNV)	Iñaki Anasagasti	Basque nationalism Christian democracy	1.3%	5	1.3%	4	No	
CC	List: Canarian Independent Groups (AIC) – Tenerife Group of Independents (ATI) – La Palma Group of Independents (API) – Gomera Group of Independents (AGI); Nationalist Canarian Initiative (ICAN); Nationalist Canarian Centre (CCN); Canarian Nationalist Party (PNC); Independent Herrenian Group (AHI); Majorera Assembly (AM)	José Carlos Mauricio	Regionalism; Canarian nationalism Centrism	0.9%	4	0.6%	0	No	
IC–V	List: Initiative for Catalonia–Greens (IC–V)	Joan Saura	Regionalism; Eco-socialism; Green politics	1.2% (Note: Results for IC–EV in the 1996 election.)	2	Contested in alliance (Note: PSC–PSOE, IC–V and ERC contested the 2000 Senate election within the Entesa alliance.)		No	
BNG	List: Galician Nationalist Bloc (BNG) – Galician People's Union (UPG) – Socialist Collective (CS) – Galician Nationalist Party–Galicianist Party (PNG–PG) – Nationalist Left (EN) – Inzar (Inzar) – Galician Unity (UG)	Francisco Rodríguez	Galician nationalism Left-wing nationalism Socialism	0.9%	2	1.0%	0	No	
ERC	List: Republican Left of Catalonia (ERC)	Joan Puigcercós	Catalan independence Left-wing nationalism Social democracy	0.7%	1	Contested in alliance		No	
EA	List: Basque Solidarity (EA)	Begoña Lasagabaster	Basque nationalism Social democracy	0.5%	1	0.5%	0	No	
UV	List: Valencian Union (UV)	José María Chiquillo	Blaverism; Conservatism	0.4%	1	0.4%	0	No	
PA	List: Andalusian Party (PA)	José Núñez	Andalusian nationalism Social democracy	0.5%	0	0.6%	0	No	
CHA	List: Aragonese Union (CHA)	José Antonio Labordeta	Aragonese nationalism Eco-socialism	0.2%	0	0.2%	0	No	
PSC– ERC–ICV	List: Socialists' Party of Catalonia (PSC); Republican Left of Catalonia (ERC); Initiative for Catalonia Greens (ICV)	Mercedes Aroz	Catalanism; Social democracy Eco-socialism	Did not contest		7.9% (Note: Results for PSC–PSOE (6.0%, 8 senators), IC–EV (1.2%, 0 senators) and ERC (0.7%, 0 senators) in the 1996 Senate election.)	8	No	
Pacte	List: Spanish Socialist Workers' Party (PSOE) (Note: In Ibiza–Formentera.); United Left (EU); Nationalist and Ecologist Agreement (ENE); Republican Left of Catalonia (ERC); The Greens of Ibiza (EV–Eiv)	Fanny Tur	Progressivism	Did not contest		0.2%	1	No	
PIL	List: Lanzarote Independents Party (PIL)	Dimas Martín	Insularism; Canarian nationalism	Did not contest		0.2%	1	No	
PAR	List: Aragonese Party (PAR)	Antonio Serrano	Regionalism; Centrism	Contested in alliance (Note: The PAR (1 deputy and 3 senators) contested the 1996 election in alliance with the PP.)				No	
Not contesting
EH	List: Popular Unity (HB) – Basque Nationalist Action (EAE/ANV); Stand Up (Zutik)	Arnaldo Otegi	Basque independence Abertzale left Revolutionary socialism	0.7% (Note: Results for HB in the 1996 election.)	2	0.8%	0	No	

The election was marked by the exploration of joint candidacies between the Spanish Socialist Workers' Party (PSOE) and other parties in the left of the political spectrum. One such example was in Catalonia, where a left-wing alliance came to fruition between the Socialists' Party of Catalonia (PSC), Republican Left of Catalonia (ERC) and Initiative for Catalonia–Greens (IC–V) under the Catalan Agreement of Progress label, aiming to mirror the success of a similar alliance between the PSC and IC–V in the 1999 Catalan regional election. Ahead of the Senate election in Ibiza and Formentera, PSOE, United Left of the Balearic Islands (EUIB), The Greens (LV), Nationalist and Ecologist Agreement (ENE) and ERC formed the Pact for Ibiza and Formentera.

Various attempts at forming a joint left-wing candidacy for the Senate in the Valencian Community were unsuccessful, primarily due to disagreement over the label and format of such an alliance. Nationwide, an agreement was reached between the national leaderships of PSOE and United Left, under which both parties agreed to cooperate in the Senate elections for 27 constituencies: in those districts, and taking consideration of the Senate electoral system allowing up to three votes to each voter, the PSOE would field two candidates to one from IU, with the parties urging voters to cast their votes as if it were a joint list of three. The PSOE also offered IU a similar agreement for the Congress of Deputies, wherein IU would not run in 34 constituencies where it would unlikely win a seat on its own, with a later offer reducing the number to 14. These offers were both rejected.

Basque Citizens (EH), the Basque electoral coalition including Herri Batasuna, called for election boycott and urged its supporters to abstain.

== Campaign ==
=== Party slogans ===
Party or alliance	Original slogan	English translation	Ref.
PP	« Vamos a más »	"We go further"	
PSOE–p	« Lo próximo »	"What comes next"	
IU	« Somos necesarios »	"We are necessary"	
CiU	« La força positiva »	"The positive force"	
BNG	« Galiza, coa capacidade de decidir »	"Galiza, with the ability to decide"	

== Opinion polls ==
Local regression trend line of poll results from 3 March 1996 to 12 March 2000, with each line corresponding to a political party.

== Voter turnout ==
The table below shows registered voter turnout during the election. Figures for election day do not include non-resident citizens, while final figures do.

Region	Time (Election day)									Final		
Region	14:00			18:00			20:00			Final		
Region	1996	2000	+/–	1996	2000	+/–	1996	2000	+/–	1996	2000	+/–
Andalusia	41.48%	36.72%	−4.76	65.17%	56.12%	−9.05	78.48%	69.77%	−8.71	78.00%	68.77%	−9.23
Aragon	42.09%	38.45%	−3.64	62.80%	56.90%	−5.90	77.90%	72.25%	−5.65	77.46%	71.39%	−6.07
Asturias	38.05%	34.39%	−3.66	62.12%	55.25%	−6.87	77.06%	69.36%	−7.70	75.91%	66.99%	−8.92
Balearic Islands	39.45%	34.96%	−4.49	59.38%	49.86%	−9.52	71.91%	61.91%	−10.00	71.63%	61.43%	−10.20
Basque Country	37.20%	35.42%	−1.78	56.42%	50.98%	−5.44	71.91%	64.51%	−7.40	71.53%	63.84%	−7.69
Canary Islands	29.56%	26.00%	−3.56	50.42%	42.45%	−7.97	69.79%	61.63%	−8.16	69.14%	60.67%	−8.47
Cantabria	39.30%	35.24%	−4.06	64.88%	58.14%	−6.74	80.12%	73.34%	−6.78	79.31%	71.81%	−7.50
Castile and León	40.91%	38.95%	−1.96	65.19%	59.97%	−5.22	79.94%	74.37%	−5.57	79.01%	72.57%	−6.44
Castilla–La Mancha	43.72%	40.10%	−3.62	69.54%	61.86%	−7.68	83.43%	77.03%	−6.40	83.09%	76.31%	−6.78
Catalonia	39.93%	34.11%	−5.82	61.05%	49.71%	−11.34	76.98%	64.70%	−12.28	76.52%	64.01%	−12.51
Extremadura	46.53%	43.40%	−3.13	69.61%	62.54%	−7.07	82.96%	76.67%	−6.29	82.33%	75.42%	−6.91
Galicia	33.09%	31.86%	−1.23	60.03%	55.61%	−4.42	73.84%	69.49%	−4.35	71.40%	65.02%	−6.38
La Rioja	44.34%	42.65%	−1.69	65.91%	60.08%	−5.83	81.53%	75.44%	−6.09	80.92%	74.21%	−6.71
Madrid	39.12%	37.12%	−2.00	65.01%	57.63%	−7.38	80.18%	73.43%	−6.75	79.59%	72.08%	−7.51
Murcia	45.01%	40.40%	−4.61	70.04%	60.96%	−9.08	82.52%	74.49%	−8.03	82.00%	73.54%	−8.46
Navarre	35.51%	35.76%	+0.25	57.37%	52.74%	−4.63	74.07%	67.16%	−6.91	73.45%	66.07%	−7.38
Valencian Community	45.75%	41.70%	−4.05	68.81%	59.95%	−8.86	82.13%	73.39%	−8.74	81.66%	72.70%	−8.96
Ceuta	33.51%	28.48%	−5.03	50.74%	42.62%	−8.12	64.29%	56.20%	−8.09	63.81%	55.15%	−8.66
Melilla	32.21%	27.01%	−5.20	49.73%	42.34%	−7.39	62.84%	55.93%	−6.91	61.95%	54.00%	−7.95
Total	40.10%	36.50%	−3.60	63.45%	55.45%	−8.00	78.08%	70.00%	−8.08	77.38%	68.71%	−8.67

== Results ==
=== Congress of Deputies ===
← Summary of the 12 March 2000 Congress of Deputies election results →
Parties and alliances	Popular vote			Seats	
Parties and alliances	Votes	%	±pp	Total	+/−
People's Party (PP)	10,321,178	44.52	+5.73	183	+27
Spanish Socialist Workers' Party–Progressives (PSOE–p)	7,918,752	34.16	−3.47	125	−16
United Left (IU)^{1}	1,263,043	5.45	−3.90	8	−11
Convergence and Union (CiU)	970,421	4.19	−0.41	15	−1
Basque Nationalist Party (EAJ/PNV)	353,953	1.53	+0.26	7	+2
Galician Nationalist Bloc (BNG)	306,268	1.32	+0.44	3	+1
Canarian Coalition (CC)	248,261	1.07	+0.19	4	±0
Andalusian Party (PA)	206,255	0.89	+0.35	1	+1
Republican Left of Catalonia (ERC)	194,715	0.84	+0.17	1	±0
Initiative for Catalonia–Greens (IC–V)^{2}	119,290	0.51	−0.68	1	−1
Basque Solidarity (EA)	100,742	0.43	−0.03	1	±0
Aragonese Union (CHA)	75,356	0.33	+0.13	1	+1
Liberal Independent Group (GIL)	72,162	0.31	New	0	±0
The Greens (Verdes)^{3}	70,906	0.31	+0.15	0	±0
Valencian Nationalist Bloc–The Greens–Valencians for Change (BNV–EV)^{4}	58,551	0.25	+0.06	0	±0
Valencian Union (UV)	57,830	0.25	−0.12	0	−1
Leonese People's Union (UPL)	41,690	0.18	+0.13	0	±0
Aragonese Party (PAR)	38,883	0.17	New	0	±0
Centrist Union–Democratic and Social Centre (UC–CDS)	23,576	0.10	−0.08	0	±0
PSM–Nationalist Agreement (PSM–EN)	23,482	0.10	±0.00	0	±0
The Eco-pacifist Greens (LVEP)	22,220	0.10	New	0	±0
The Greens of the Community of Madrid (LVCM)	21,087	0.09	+0.06	0	±0
The Greens–Green Group (LV–GV)	20,618	0.09	+0.02	0	±0
Humanist Party (PH)	19,683	0.08	+0.03	0	±0
Commoners' Land–Castilian Nationalist Party (TC–PNC)	18,290	0.08	+0.06	0	±0
Natural Law Party (PLN)	17,372	0.07	New	0	±0
The Phalanx (FE)	14,431	0.06	New	0	±0
Asturian Renewal Union (URAS)	13,360	0.06	New	0	±0
Communist Party of the Peoples of Spain (PCPE)	12,898	0.06	±0.00	0	±0
Internationalist Socialist Workers' Party (POSI)^{5}	12,208	0.05	+0.04	0	±0
The Greens–Green Alternative (EV–AV)	11,579	0.05	New	0	±0
Lanzarote Independents Party (PIL)	10,323	0.04	New	0	±0
Spain 2000 Platform (ES2000)	9,562	0.04	New	0	±0
Spanish Democratic Party (PADE)	9,136	0.04	New	0	±0
Convergence of Democrats of Navarre (CDN)	8,646	0.04	−0.03	0	±0
Majorcan Union–Independents of Menorca (UM–INME)	8,372	0.04	+0.01	0	±0
Andalusian Left (IA)	8,175	0.04	New	0	±0
Independent Spanish Phalanx–Phalanx 2000 (FEI–FE 2000)	6,621	0.03	+0.02	0	±0
Localist Bloc of Melilla (BLM)	6,514	0.03	New	0	±0
Riojan Party (PR)	6,155	0.03	+0.01	0	±0
Asturianist Party (PAS)	5,876	0.03	−0.02	0	±0
Regionalist Unity of Castile and León (URCL)	5,683	0.02	±0.00	0	±0
United Extremadura (EU)	4,771	0.02	New	0	±0
Party of Self-employed and Professionals (AUTONOMO)	4,218	0.02	New	0	±0
Independent Candidacy–The Party of Castile and León (CI–PCL)	4,184	0.02	New	0	±0
Catalan State (EC)	3,356	0.01	New	0	±0
Andalusian Nation (NA)	3,262	0.01	±0.00	0	±0
Galician Democracy (DG)	2,958	0.01	New	0	±0
Republican Action (AR)	2,858	0.01	+0.01	0	±0
Party of the Democratic Karma (PKD)	2,759	0.01	New	0	±0
Andalusia Assembly (A)	2,727	0.01	New	0	±0
Party of Self-employed, Retirees and Independents (EL–PAPI)	2,713	0.01	New	0	±0
Extremaduran Coalition (PREx–CREx)	2,371	0.01	−0.02	0	±0
Galician Coalition (CG)	2,361	0.01	New	0	±0
Zamoran People's Union (UPZ)	2,347	0.01	New	0	±0
Galician People's Front (FPG)	2,252	0.01	±0.00	0	±0
Carlist Party (PC)	2,131	0.01	New	0	±0
Salamanca–Zamora–León–PREPAL (PREPAL)	2,118	0.01	±0.00	0	±0
Cantabrian Nationalist Council (CNC)	2,103	0.01	New	0	±0
Andecha Astur (AA)	2,036	0.01	New	0	±0
Self-employed Spanish Party (PEDA)	1,904	0.01	New	0	±0
Internationalist Struggle (LI (LIT–CI))	1,716	0.01	New	0	±0
Party Association of Widows and Legal Wives (PAVIEL)	1,690	0.01	New	0	±0
Republican Left–Left Republican Party (IR–PRE)	1,541	0.01	New	0	±0
Party of Self-employed, Retirees and Widows (PAE)	1,462	0.01	+0.01	0	±0
Independent Salamancan Union (USI)	1,416	0.01	New	0	±0
Independent Socialists of Extremadura (SIEx)	1,412	0.01	±0.00	0	±0
Madrilenian Independent Regional Party (PRIM)	1,363	0.01	±0.00	0	±0
Caló Nationalist Party (PNCA)	1,331	0.01	New	0	±0
Party of El Bierzo (PB)	1,191	0.01	+0.01	0	±0
Asturian Left Bloc (BIA)	1,085	0.00	New	0	±0
Aragonese Initiative (INAR)	1,057	0.00	New	0	±0
Progressives of Canaries Unity (UP–CAN)	980	0.00	New	0	±0
Valencian Nationalist Left (ENV)	920	0.00	±0.00	0	±0
Almerian Regionalist Union (URAL)	838	0.00	New	0	±0
Socialist Party of the People of Ceuta (PSPC)	788	0.00	−0.01	0	±0
European Nation State (N)	710	0.00	±0.00	0	±0
Liberal and Social Democratic Coalition (CSD–L)	650	0.00	New	0	±0
Citizens' Convergence of the South-East (CCSE)	645	0.00	New	0	±0
Federal Progressives (PF)	609	0.00	New	0	±0
New Region (NR)	598	0.00	−0.01	0	±0
Christian Positivist Party (PPCr)	546	0.00	New	0	±0
Balearic People's Union (UPB)	524	0.00	New	0	±0
Voice of the Andalusian People (VDPA)	493	0.00	±0.00	0	±0
Independent Initiative (II)	425	0.00	New	0	±0
Regionalist Party of Guadalajara (PRGU)	400	0.00	±0.00	0	±0
Iberian Union (UNIB)	388	0.00	New	0	±0
New Force (FN)	343	0.00	New	0	±0
Social and Autonomist Liberal Group (ALAS)	339	0.00	±0.00	0	±0
Balearic Islands Renewal Party (PRIB)	334	0.00	New	0	±0
Pensionist Assembly of the Canaries (TPC)	319	0.00	New	0	±0
National Union (UN)	314	0.00	New	0	±0
Cives (Cives)	206	0.00	New	0	±0
Movement for Humanist Socialism (MASH)	121	0.00	New	0	±0
Democratic Party of the People (PDEP)	85	0.00	New	0	±0
Nationalist Aprome (Aprome)	60	0.00	New	0	±0
Basque Citizens (EH)^{6}	0	0.00	−0.72	0	−2
Blank ballots	366,823	1.58	+0.61		
Total	23,181,290			350	±0
Valid votes	23,181,290	99.32	−0.18		
Invalid votes	158,200	0.68	+0.18		
Votes cast / turnout	23,339,490	68.71	−8.67		
Abstentions	10,630,150	31.29	+8.67		
Registered voters	33,969,640				
Sources
Footnotes: ^{1} United Left does not include Initiative for Catalonia results in Catalonia.; ^{2} Initiative for Catalonia–Greens results are compared to Initiative for Catalonia totals in the 1996 election, only in Catalonia.; ^{3} The Greens does not include results in the Valencian Community.; ^{4} Valencian Nationalist Bloc–The Greens–Valencians for Change results are compared to the combined totals of Valencian People's Union–Nationalist Bloc and The Greens of the Valencian Country in the 1996 election.; ^{5} Internationalist Socialist Workers' Party results are compared to Republican Coalition totals in the 1996 election.; ^{6} Basque Citizens results are compared to Popular Unity totals in the 1996 election. EH called for election boycott and urged its supporters to abstain.

Popular vote
PP	44.52%
PSOE–p	34.16%
IU	5.45%
CiU	4.19%
EAJ/PNV	1.53%
BNG	1.32%
CC	1.07%
PA	0.89%
ERC	0.84%
IC–V	0.51%
EA	0.43%
CHA	0.33%
Others	3.18%
Blank ballots	1.58%

Seats
PP	52.29%
PSOE–p	35.71%
CiU	4.29%
IU	2.29%
EAJ/PNV	2.00%
CC	1.14%
BNG	0.89%
PA	0.29%
ERC	0.29%
IC–V	0.29%
EA	0.29%
CHA	0.29%

=== Senate ===
← Summary of the 12 March 2000 Senate of Spain election results →
Parties and alliances	Popular vote			Seats	
Parties and alliances	Votes	%	±pp	Total	+/−
People's Party (PP)	28,097,204	45.35	+6.31	127	+15
Spanish Socialist Workers' Party–Progressives (PSOE–p)^{1}	16,323,744	26.35	−5.35	53	−20
United Left (IU)^{2}	4,752,113	7.67	−1.13	0	±0
Catalan Agreement of Progress (PSC–ERC–IC–V)^{3}	3,718,949	6.00	−1.88	8	±0
Convergence and Union (CiU)	2,809,367	4.53	−0.34	8	±0
Basque Nationalist Party (EAJ/PNV)	1,022,057	1.65	+0.31	6	+2
Galician Nationalist Bloc (BNG)	887,326	1.43	+0.45	0	±0
Andalusian Party (PA)	577,849	0.93	+0.32	0	±0
Canarian Coalition (CC)	438,149	0.71	+0.14	5	+4
Basque Solidarity (EA)	294,145	0.47	−0.02	0	±0
Liberal Independent Group (GIL)	215,285	0.35	New	0	±0
Aragonese Union (CHA)	186,411	0.30	+0.10	0	±0
The Greens (Verdes)^{4}	181,453	0.29	+0.15	0	±0
Valencian Union (UV)	174,419	0.28	−0.13	0	±0
Leonese People's Union (UPL)	126,859	0.20	+0.13	0	±0
Aragonese Party (PAR)	123,176	0.20	New	0	±0
Valencian Nationalist Bloc–The Greens–Valencians for Change (BNV–EV)^{5}	83,006	0.13	−0.06	0	±0
Commoners' Land–Castilian Nationalist Party (TC–PNC)	70,979	0.11	+0.07	0	±0
Humanist Party (PH)	67,228	0.11	+0.07	0	±0
Centrist Union–Democratic and Social Centre (UC–CDS)	65,024	0.10	−0.09	0	±0
The Greens of the Community of Madrid (LVCM)	55,357	0.09	+0.07	0	±0
Internationalist Socialist Workers' Party (POSI)^{6}	51,185	0.08	+0.06	0	±0
Communist Party of the Peoples of Spain (PCPE)	50,326	0.08	+0.03	0	±0
The Greens–Green Alternative (EV–AV)	49,799	0.08	New	0	±0
The Eco-pacifist Greens (LVEP)	49,326	0.08	New	0	±0
The Greens–Green Group (LV–GV)	45,248	0.07	−0.03	0	±0
PSM–Nationalist Agreement (PSM–EN)	44,953	0.07	±0.00	0	±0
Asturian Renewal Union (URAS)	41,829	0.07	New	0	±0
The Phalanx (FE)	35,655	0.06	New	0	±0
The Greens–Green Option (EV–OV)	34,601	0.06	New	0	±0
Carlist Traditionalist Communion (CTC)	32,066	0.05	New	0	±0
Progressive Pact (Pacte–PPM)^{7}	30,619	0.05	+0.02	0	−1
Majorcan Union (UM)	26,275	0.04	+0.01	0	±0
Independent Spanish Phalanx–Phalanx 2000 (FEI–FE 2000)	24,964	0.04	+0.02	0	±0
Andalusian Left (IA)	23,688	0.04	New	0	±0
Convergence of Democrats of Navarre (CDN)	22,952	0.04	New	0	±0
Asturianist Party (PAS)	20,005	0.03	−0.03	0	±0
Riojan Party (PR)	19,667	0.03	±0.00	0	±0
United Extremadura (EU)	18,937	0.03	New	0	±0
Regionalist Unity of Castile and León (URCL)	18,387	0.03	+0.01	0	±0
Catalan State (EC)	17,825	0.03	New	0	±0
Spanish Democratic Party (PADE)	17,400	0.03	New	0	±0
New Force (FN)	15,452	0.02	New	0	±0
Alliance for Development and Nature (ADN)	15,378	0.02	New	0	±0
Party of Self-employed, Retirees and Independents (EL–PAPI)	15,340	0.02	New	0	±0
Bounced Public Workers (TPR)	15,094	0.02	New	0	±0
Natural Law Party (PLN)	14,211	0.02	New	0	±0
Galician Democracy (DG)	13,693	0.02	New	0	±0
Lanzarote Independents Party (PIL)	13,528	0.02	±0.00	1	±0
Localist Bloc of Melilla (BLM)	13,060	0.02	New	0	±0
Republican Action (AR)	12,531	0.02	+0.01	0	±0
Independent Candidacy–The Party of Castile and León (CI–PCL)	12,215	0.02	New	0	±0
Republican Left–Left Republican Party (IR–PRE)	12,207	0.02	New	0	±0
Castilian Left (IzCa)	11,921	0.02	New	0	±0
Republican Left of Catalonia (ERC)^{8}	11,828	0.02	+0.01	0	±0
Andalusia Assembly (A)	10,988	0.02	New	0	±0
Party of Self-employed and Professionals (AUTONOMO)	10,863	0.02	New	0	±0
Party Association of Widows and Legal Wives (PAVIEL)	9,240	0.01	New	0	±0
Andecha Astur (AA)	8,925	0.01	New	0	±0
Salamanca–Zamora–León–PREPAL (PREPAL)	8,691	0.01	−0.01	0	±0
Party of the Democratic Karma (PKD)	8,433	0.01	New	0	±0
Zamoran People's Union (UPZ)	7,928	0.01	New	0	±0
Andalusian Nation (NA)	7,821	0.01	−0.01	0	±0
Galician People's Front (FPG)	7,748	0.01	±0.00	0	±0
Spain 2000 Platform (ES2000)	7,258	0.01	New	0	±0
Iberian Union (UNIB)	6,760	0.01	New	0	±0
Carlist Party (PC)	6,421	0.01	New	0	±0
Self-employed Spanish Party (PEDA)	5,985	0.01	New	0	±0
Valencian Nationalist Left (ENV)	5,837	0.01	+0.01	0	±0
Iberian Unity (UI)	5,767	0.01	+0.01	0	±0
Asturian Left Bloc (BIA)	5,550	0.01	New	0	±0
Independent Salamancan Union (USI)	5,018	0.01	New	0	±0
Internationalist Struggle (LI (LIT–CI))	4,624	0.01	New	0	±0
Aragonese Initiative (INAR)	4,244	0.01	New	0	±0
Madrilenian Independent Regional Party (PRIM)	4,204	0.01	±0.00	0	±0
Natural Culture (CN)	4,010	0.01	±0.00	0	±0
Almerian Regionalist Union (URAL)	3,951	0.01	New	0	±0
Cantabrian Nationalist Council (CNC)	3,929	0.01	New	0	±0
Galician Coalition (CG)	3,153	0.01	New	0	±0
Party of El Bierzo (PB)	2,409	0.00	−0.01	0	±0
Immigrants with the Right to Equality and Obligations (INDIO)	2,272	0.00	New	0	±0
Pensionist Assembly of the Canaries (TPC)	1,972	0.00	New	0	±0
Christian Positivist Party (PPCr)	1,911	0.00	New	0	±0
Spanish New Republicans (NURP)	1,878	0.00	New	0	±0
Progressives of Canaries Unity (UP–CAN)	1,847	0.00	New	0	±0
Federal Progressives (PF)	1,787	0.00	New	0	±0
Liberal and Social Democratic Coalition (CSD–L)	1,741	0.00	New	0	±0
Regionalist Party of Guadalajara (PRGU)	1,630	0.00	±0.00	0	±0
European Nation State (N)	1,601	0.00	±0.00	0	±0
European Green Group (GVE)	1,532	0.00	New	0	±0
Socialist Party of the People of Ceuta (PSPC)	1,511	0.00	−0.01	0	±0
Balearic People's Union (UPB)	1,413	0.00	New	0	±0
Independent Initiative (II)	1,374	0.00	New	0	±0
Party of Self-employed, Retirees and Widows (PAE)	1,087	0.00	±0.00	0	±0
Voice of the Andalusian People (VDPA)	1,007	0.00	±0.00	0	±0
Social and Autonomist Liberal Group (ALAS)	895	0.00	±0.00	0	±0
Cives (Cives)	889	0.00	New	0	±0
New Region (NR)	874	0.00	−0.01	0	±0
Movement for Humanist Socialism (MASH)	869	0.00	New	0	±0
Spanish Action (AE)	817	0.00	±0.00	0	±0
Citizens' Convergence of the South-East (CCSE)	699	0.00	New	0	±0
Balearic Islands Renewal Party (PRIB)	687	0.00	New	0	±0
National Union (UN)	491	0.00	New	0	±0
Nationalist Aprome (Aprome)	154	0.00	New	0	±0
Clean Hands Project (PML)	0	0.00	±0.00	0	±0
Blank ballots (Note: The percentage of blank ballots is calculated over the official number of valid votes cast, irrespective of the total number of votes shown as a result of adding up the individual results for each party.)	642,682	2.82	+0.85		
Total	61,955,642			208	±0
Valid votes	22,799,475	97.51	+0.10		
Invalid votes	583,192	2.49	−0.10		
Votes cast / turnout	23,382,667	68.83	−8.50		
Abstentions	10,586,973	31.17	+8.50		
Registered voters	33,969,640				
Sources
Footnotes: ^{1} Spanish Socialist Workers' Party–Progressives results are compared to Spanish Socialist Workers' Party totals in the 1996 election, not including results in Catalonia.; ^{2} United Left does not include Initiative for Catalonia results in Catalonia.; ^{3} Catalan Agreement of Progress results are compared to the combined totals of Spanish Socialist Workers' Party, United Left and Republican Left of Catalonia in Catalonia in the 1996 election.; ^{4} The Greens does not include results in the Valencian Community.; ^{5} Valencian Nationalist Bloc–The Greens–Valencians for Change results are compared to the combined totals of Valencian People's Union–Nationalist Bloc and The Greens of the Valencian Country in the 1996 election.; ^{6} Internationalist Socialist Workers' Party results are compared to Republican Coalition totals in the 1996 election.; ^{7} Progressive Pact results are compared to Ibiza and Formentera in the Senate totals in the 1996 election.; ^{8} Republican Left of Catalonia does not include results in Catalonia.

Popular vote
PP	45.35%
PSOE–p	26.35%
IU	7.67%
ECdP	6.00%
CiU	4.53%
EAJ/PNV	1.65%
BNG	1.43%
CC	0.71%
PIL	0.02%
Others	5.25%
Blank ballots	2.82%

Seats
PP	61.06%
PSOE–p	25.48%
ECdP	3.85%
CiU	3.85%
EAJ/PNV	2.88%
CC	2.40%
PIL	0.48%

=== Maps ===
Election results by constituency (Congress).

Vote winner strength by constituency (Congress).

Vote winner strength by autonomous community (Congress).

== Aftermath ==
=== Government formation ===
Investiture; Congress of Deputies; Nomination of José María Aznar (PP)
Ballot →	26 April 2000
Required majority →	176 out of 350
Yes: • PP (183); • CiU (15); • CC (4)	202 / 350
No: • PSOE (125); • IU (8); • PNV (7); • BNG (3); • PA (1); • ERC (1); • ICV (1); • EA (1); • CHA (1)	148 / 350
Abstentions	0 / 350
Absentees	0 / 350

== Bibliography ==
Legislation

- Constitución Española (Constitution). Official State Gazette (in Spanish). 27 December 1978 [version as of 28 August 1992]. BOE-A-1978-31229.
- Ley Orgánica 5/1985, de 19 de junio, del Régimen Electoral General (Organic Law 5/1985). Official State Gazette (in Spanish). 19 June 1985 [version as of 22 April 1999]. BOE-A-1985-11672.
- Ley 13/1997, de 25 de abril, por la que pasa a denominarse oficialmente Illes Balears la provincia de Baleares (Law 13/1997). Official State Gazette (in Spanish). 25 April 1997. BOE-A-1997-9019.
- Ley 2/1998, 3 de marzo, sobre el cambio de denominación de las provincias de La Coruña y Orense (Law 2/1998). Official State Gazette (in Spanish). 3 March 1998. BOE-A-1998-5184.
- Real Decreto 64/2000, de 17 de enero, de disolución del Congreso de los Diputados y del Senado y de convocatoria de elecciones (Royal Decree 64/2000). Official State Gazette (in Spanish). 17 January 2000. BOE-A-2000-1001.

Other

- Carreras de Odriozola, Albert; Tafunell Sambola, Xavier (2005) [1989]. Estadísticas históricas de España, siglos XIX-XX (PDF) (in Spanish). Vol. 1 (II ed.). Bilbao: Fundación BBVA. pp. 1072–1097. ISBN 84-96515-00-1. Archived from the original (PDF) on 24 September 2015.
- Whitfield, Teresa (December 2015). Special Report 384. The Basque Conflict and ETA. The Difficulties of an Ending (PDF) (Report). United States Institute of Peace.
- Sangrador-Vegas, Begoña (2020). "People's Party (1996-2004): Economic Boom, Immigration and 11-M". The Nation in Its Labyrinth: An Introduction to Contemporary Spain since 1898 (in Spanish). Madrid: Pressbooks.
