= Localist Bloc of Melilla =

Localist Bloc of Melilla Bloque Localista de Melilla
- Founded: 2000
- Dissolved: 2000
- Headquarters: Melilla
- Ideology: Progressivism; Localism; Populism

The Localist Bloc of Melilla (Spanish: Bloque Localista de Melilla; BLM) was a Spanish electoral alliance formed to contest the 2000 general election in Melilla by the parties forming the incumbent local government, the Independent Liberal Group (GIL), Coalition for Melilla (CpM) and the Independent Party of Melilla (PIM). While the alliance placed second ahead of the Spanish Socialist Workers' Party (PSOE) with 6,514 votes and 24.8% of the share, it failed well short of winning Melilla's single seat from the People's Party (PP) and was disbanded shortly thereafter.
