= 1999 Spanish elections =

1999 Spanish elections may refer to one of three nationwide elections held in Spain on 13 June 1999:

- 1999 Spanish local elections, to elect local seats in Spanish municipalities, provinces and island councils.
- 1999 Spanish regional elections, to elect the regional parliaments of thirteen autonomous communities.
- 1999 European Parliament election in Spain, to elect the Spanish delegation to the 5th European Parliament.
