= List of members of the European Parliament for Spain, 1994–1999 =

Members of the European Parliament for Spain
| Delegation | (1986) |
| 2nd term | (1987) |
| 3rd term | (1989) |
| 4th term | (1994) |
| 5th term | (1999) |
| 6th term | (2004) |
| 7th term | (2009) |
| 8th term | (2014) |
| 9th term | (2019) |
| 10th term | (2024) |

This is a list of members of the European Parliament for Spain in the 1994 to 1999 session, ordered by name. See 1994 European Parliament election in Spain for election results.

== List ==
| Name | National party | EP Group |
|---|---|---|
| Julio Añoveros Trias de Bes | People's Party | EPP |
| Javier Areitio Toledo | People's Party | EPP |
| Mercedes de la Merced (until 12 December 1996); Felipe Camisón Asensio (from 12 December 1996) | People's Party | EPP |
| Miguel Arias Cañete | People's Party | EPP |
| Francisca Bennàssar Tous | People's Party | EPP |
| Luis Campoy Zueco | People's Party | EPP |
| Laura Elena de Esteban Martín | People's Party | EPP |
| José Antonio Escudero | People's Party | EPP |
| María Teresa Estevan Bolea | People's Party | EPP |
| Juan Manuel Fabra Vallés | People's Party | EPP |
| Gerardo Fernández Albor | People's Party | EPP |
| Fernando Fernández Martín | People's Party | EPP |
| Carmen Fraga Estévez | People's Party | EPP |
| Gerardo Galeote Quecedo | People's Party | EPP |
| José Manuel García-Margallo | People's Party | EPP |
| Salvador Garriga Polledo | People's Party | EPP |
| José María Gil-Robles | People's Party | EPP |
| Celia Villalobos (until 2 October 1995); Jorge Salvador Hernández Mollar (from 2 October 1995) | People's Party | EPP |
| Íñigo Méndez de Vigo | People's Party | EPP |
| Ana de Palacio | People's Party | EPP |
| Abel Matutes (until 10 May 1996); José Javier Pomés Ruiz (from 10 May 1996) | People's Party | EPP |
| Encarnación Redondo Jiménez | People's Party | EPP |
| Carlos Robles Piquer | People's Party | EPP |
| José Salafranca Sánchez-Neyra | People's Party | EPP |
| Joaquín Sisó Cruellas | People's Party | EPP |
| Jaime Valdivielso de Cué | People's Party | EPP |
| José Valverde López | People's Party | EPP |
| Daniel Varela | People's Party | EPP |
| Pedro Aparicio | Socialist Workers' Party | PES |
| Enrique Barón | Socialist Workers' Party | PES |
| Carmen Diez de Rivera (until 4 February 1999); Carlos María Bru (from 4 February 1999) | Socialist Workers' Party | PES |
| Jesús Cabezón | Socialist Workers' Party | PES |
| Juan Luis Colino Salamanca | Socialist Workers' Party | PES |
| Joan Colom i Naval | Socialist Workers' Party | PES |
| Bárbara Dührkop Dührkop | Socialist Workers' Party | PES |
| Manuela Frutos Gama | Socialist Workers' Party | PES |
| Ludivina García | Socialist Workers' Party | PES |
| Antonio González Triviño | Socialist Workers' Party | PES |
| Juan de Dios Izquierdo Collado | Socialist Workers' Party | PES |
| María Izquierdo Rojo | Socialist Workers' Party | PES |
| Manuel Medina Ortega | Socialist Workers' Party | PES |
| José María Mendiluce | Socialist Workers' Party | PES |
| Ana Miranda de Lage | Socialist Workers' Party | PES |
| Fernando Pérez Royo | Socialist Workers' Party | PES |
| José Enrique Pons Grau | Socialist Workers' Party | PES |
| Fernando Morán (until 9 April 1999); Juan de Dios Ramírez Heredia (from 9 April 1999) | Socialist Workers' Party | PES |
| Francisco Javier Sanz Fernández | Socialist Workers' Party | PES |
| Francisca Sauquillo Pérez del Arco | Socialist Workers' Party | PES |
| Anna Terrón i Cusí | Socialist Workers' Party | PES |
| Josep Verde | Socialist Workers' Party | PES |
| Carlos Carnero | United Left – Initiative for Catalonia | EUL (1994–1995) / EUL–NGL |
| Laura González Álvarez | United Left – Initiative for Catalonia | EUL (1994–1995) / EUL–NGL |
| Antoni Gutiérrez | United Left – Initiative for Catalonia | EUL (1994–1995) / EUL–NGL |
| Salvador Jové Peres | United Left – Initiative for Catalonia | EUL (1994–1995) / EUL–NGL |
| Pedro Marset Campos | United Left – Initiative for Catalonia | EUL (1994–1995) / EUL–NGL |
| Alonso Puerta | United Left – Initiative for Catalonia | EUL (1994–1995) / EUL–NGL |
| Ángela Sierra | United Left – Initiative for Catalonia | EUL (1994–1995) / EUL–NGL |
| María Sornosa Martínez | United Left – Initiative for Catalonia | EUL (1994–1995) / EUL–NGL |
| María Jesús Aramburu (until 28 March 1996); Abdelkader Mohamed Ali (from 28 March 1996) | United Left – Initiative for Catalonia | EUL (1994–1995) / EUL–NGL |
| Carles-Alfred Gasòliba i Böhm | Convergence and Union | ELDR |
| Concepció Ferrer | Convergence and Union | ELDR |
| Joan Vallvé i Ribera | Convergence and Union | ELDR |
| Josu Jon Imaz (until 5 January 1999); José Domingo Posada (from 21 January 1999) | Nationalist Coalition | |
| Isidoro Sánchez (until 17 September 1996); Alfonso Novo (18 September 1996 – 7 October 1998); Manuel Escolá (from 8 October 1998) | Nationalist Coalition | |
