= List of members of the European Parliament for Spain, 1989–1994 =

Members of the European Parliament for Spain
Delegation	(1986)
2nd term	(1987)
3rd term	(1989)
4th term	(1994)
5th term	(1999)
6th term	(2004)
7th term	(2009)
8th term	(2014)
9th term	(2019)
10th term	(2024)

This is a list of the 81 members of the European Parliament for Spain during the 1989 to 1994 session.

== List ==
Name	National party	EP Group
José Álvarez de Paz	Socialist Workers' Party	SOC
Víctor Manuel Arbeloa Muru	Socialist Workers' Party	SOC
Javier Areitio Toledo (from 13 July 1993)	People's Party	EPP
Miguel Arias Cañete	People's Party	EPP
Juan María Bandrés Molet	Left of the Peoples	G
Enrique Barón Crespo	Socialist Workers' Party	SOC
Pedro Bofill Abeilhe	Socialist Workers' Party	SOC
Carlos María Bru Purón	Socialist Workers' Party	SOC
Jesús Cabezón Alonso	Socialist Workers' Party	SOC
Rafael Calvo Ortega	Democratic and Social Centre	LDR
Juan José de la Cámara Martínez	Socialist Workers' Party	SOC
Eusebio Cano Pinto	Socialist Workers' Party	SOC
Juan Luis Colino Salamanca	Socialist Workers' Party	SOC
Joan Colom i Naval	Socialist Workers' Party (Socialists of Catalonia Party)	SOC
Carmen Díez de Rivera Icaza	Socialist Workers' Party	SOC
Teresa Domingo Segarra	United Left	EUL (until 11 January 1993) Non-Inscrits
José Manuel Duarte Cendán (from 10 September 1990)	Socialist Workers' Party	SOC
Bárbara Dührkop Dührkop	Socialist Workers' Party	SOC
Arturo Juan Escuder Croft (until 8 October 1992)	People's Party	EPP
José Antonio Escudero (from 22 November 1989)	Democratic and Social Centre	LDR (until 19 December 1991) EPP
Gerardo Fernández-Albor	People's Party	EPP
Concepció Ferrer	Convergence and Union	EPP
Juan Carlos Garaikoetxea Urriza (until 14 March 1991) Heribert Barrera i Costa (from 21 March 1991)	Basque Solidarity (until 14 March 1991) Republican Left of Catalonia	RWG
Manuel García Amigo	People's Party	EPP
Ludivina García Arias	Socialist Workers' Party	SOC
Carles-Alfred Gasòliba i Böhm	Convergence and Union	LDR
José María Gil-Robles Gil-Delgado	People's Party	EPP
Antoni Gutiérrez Díaz	United Left	EUL (until 11 January 1993) NI
María Izquierdo Rojo	Socialist Workers' Party	SOC
Pío Cabanillas Gallas (until 10 October 1991) José María Lafuente López (from 18 October 1991)	People's Party	EPP
José María Montero Zabala (until on 1 September 1990) Karmelo Landa Mendibe (from 6 September 1990)	Herri Batasuna	NI
Carmen Llorca Villaplana	People's Party	EPP
Manuel Medina Ortega	Socialist Workers' Party	SOC
Íñigo Méndez de Vigo (from 19 October 1992)	People's Party	EPP
Ana Miranda de Lage	Socialist Workers' Party	SOC
Fernando Morán López	Socialist Workers' Party	SOC
Raúl Morodo Leoncio	Democratic and Social Centre	LDR
Antonio Navarro Velasco	People's Party	EPP
Francisco Oliva Garcia (until 28 July 1990)	Socialist Workers' Party	SOC
Marcelino Oreja (until 28 June 1993)	People's Party	EPP
Leopoldo Ortiz Climent (until 29 June 1993)	People's Party	EPP
Pedro Pacheco Herrera (until 18 July 1990) Diego de los Santos López (from 30 July 1990)	Andalusian Party	RWG
Fernando Pérez Royo (until 29 December 1992) Laura González Álvarez (from 12 January 1993)	United Left	EUL (until 29 December 1992) NI
Carlos Perreau de Pinninck Domenech	Ruiz-Mateos Group	NI (until 11 September 1989) EDA
José Javier Pomés Ruiz (from 30 June 1993)	People's Party	EPP
Josep Pons Grau	Socialist Workers' Party	SOC
Juan Antonio Gangoiti Llaguno (until 7 July 1992) Isidoro Sánchez García (from 8 July 1992 to 14 July 1993) José Domingo Posada González (from 15 July 1993)	Nationalist Coalition	NI (until 8 July 1990) EPP (until 8 July 1992) RWG
Alonso José Puerta	United Left	EUL (until 11 January 1993) NI
Eduard Punset i Casals	Democratic and Social Centre	LDR
Juan de Dios Ramírez Heredia	Socialist Workers' Party	SOC
Carlos Robles Piquer	People's Party	EPP
Domènec Romera I Alcàzar	People's Party	EPP
Xavier Rubert de Ventós	Socialist Workers' Party (Catalan Socialist Party)	SOC
Guadalupe Ruiz-Giménez Aguilar	Democratic and Social Centre	LDR
José María Ruiz-Mateos Jiménez de Tejada	Ruiz-Mateos Group	NI (until 11 September 1989) EDA
Francisco Javier Sanz Fernández	Socialist Workers' Party	SOC
Enrique Sapena Granell	Socialist Workers' Party	SOC
Mateo Sierra Bardají	Socialist Workers' Party	SOC
Joaquín Sisó Cruellas	People's Party	EPP
Fernando Suárez González	People's Party	EPP
Luis Planas Puchades (until 28 December 1993) Anna Terrón i Cusí (from 18 January 1994)	Socialist Workers' Party	SOC
José Valverde López	People's Party	EPP
José Vázquez Fouz	Socialist Workers' Party	SOC
Josep Verde i Aldea	Socialist Workers' Party	SOC
