= List of members of the European Parliament for Spain, 1986–1987 =

Members of the European Parliament for Spain
Delegation	(1986)
2nd term	(1987)
3rd term	(1989)
4th term	(1994)
5th term	(1999)
6th term	(2004)
7th term	(2009)
8th term	(2014)
9th term	(2019)
10th term	(2024)

This is a list of the appointed Members of European Parliament for Spain from 1986 to 1987. The first (direct) elections were held in 1987.

== List ==
Name	National party	EP Group
José Álvarez de Paz	Socialist Workers' Party	SOC
Víctor Manuel Arbeloa Muru	Socialist Workers' Party	SOC
Enrique Barón Crespo	Socialist Workers' Party	SOC
Carlos Barral Agesta	Socialist Workers' Party	SOC
Bernardo Bayona Aznar	Socialist Workers' Party	SOC
Carlos María Bru Purón	Socialist Workers' Party	SOC
José Miguel Bueno Vicente	Socialist Workers' Party	SOC
Esteban Caamaño Bernal	Socialist Workers' Party	SOC
Jesús Cabezón Alonso	Socialist Workers' Party	SOC
José Cabrera Bazan	Socialist Workers' Party	SOC
Eusebio Cano Pinto	Socialist Workers' Party	SOC
Juan Luis Colino Salamanca	Socialist Workers' Party	SOC
Joan Colom i Naval	Socialist Workers' Party	SOC
José Manuel Duarte Cendán	Socialist Workers' Party	SOC
Rafael Estrella Pedrola	Socialist Workers' Party	SOC
María Elena Flores Valencia	Socialist Workers' Party	SOC
Ludivina García Arias	Socialist Workers' Party	SOC
Antonio Garcia-Pagan Zamora	Socialist Workers' Party	SOC
José Luis Garcia Raya	Socialist Workers' Party	SOC
Julián Grimaldos	Socialist Workers' Party	SOC
José Ramón Herrero Merediz	Socialist Workers' Party	SOC
Zenon-José Luis Paz	Socialist Workers' Party	SOC
Manuel Medina Ortega	Socialist Workers' Party	SOC
Ana Miranda de Lage	Socialist Workers' Party	SOC
Francisco Oliva Garcia	Socialist Workers' Party	SOC
Luis Planas Puchades	Socialist Workers' Party	SOC
Josep Pons Grau	Socialist Workers' Party	SOC
Juan de Dios Ramírez Heredia	Socialist Workers' Party	SOC
María Dolores Renau i Manen	Socialist Workers' Party	SOC
Xavier Rubert de Ventós	Socialist Workers' Party	SOC
Felipe Sanchez-Cuenca Martinez	Socialist Workers' Party	SOC
Francisco Javier Sanz Fernández	Socialist Workers' Party	SOC
Enrique Sapena Granell	Socialist Workers' Party	SOC
Mateo Sierra Bardají	Socialist Workers' Party	SOC
José Vázquez Fouz	Socialist Workers' Party	SOC
Josep Verde i Aldea	Socialist Workers' Party	SOC
José María Alvarez de Eulate Peñaranda	People's Alliance	ED
Miguel Arias Cañete	People's Alliance	ED
Pío Cabanillas Gallas	People's Alliance	Non-Inscrits (until 5 July 1987) ED
Manuel Cantarero del Castillo	People's Alliance	ED
Emilio Duran Corsanego	People's Alliance	ED
Arturo Juan Escuder Croft	People's Alliance	ED
Manuel García Amigo	People's Alliance	ED
José María Lafuente López	People's Alliance	ED
Carmen Llorca Villaplana	People's Alliance	ED
Antonio Navarro	People's Alliance	ED
Luis Guillermo Perinat y Elío	People's Alliance	ED
Carlos Robles Piquer	People's Alliance	ED
Domènec Romera i Alcàzar	People's Alliance	ED
Fernando Suárez González	People's Alliance	ED
Julen Guimón	Democratic Popular Party	EPP (until 17 December 1986) ED
César Llorens Barges	Democratic Popular Party	EPP
Luis Vega y Escandon	Democratic Popular Party	EPP
Juan Antonio Gangoiti Llaguno	Nationalist Party (Basque Country)	EPP
Andoni Monforte Arregui	Nationalist Party (Basque Country)	EPP
Leopoldo Calvo-Sotelo	Union of the Democratic Centre	EPP
Josep Antoni Duran i Lleida	Democratic Union (Catalonia)	EPP
Carles-Alfred Gasòliba i Böhm	Convergence and Union	LDR
Carlos Manuel Bencomo Mendoza	Democratic and Social Centre	LDR
Juan María Bandrés Molet	Eusko Alkartasuna	RBW
