= List of members of the European Parliament for Spain, 1999–2004 =

Members of the European Parliament for Spain
| Delegation | (1986) |
| 2nd term | (1987) |
| 3rd term | (1989) |
| 4th term | (1994) |
| 5th term | (1999) |
| 6th term | (2004) |
| 7th term | (2009) |
| 8th term | (2014) |
| 9th term | (2019) |
| 10th term | (2024) |

This is a list of the 64 members of the European Parliament for Spain in the 1999 to 2004 session. In the elections People's Party won 27 seats and Spanish Socialist Workers' Party won 24 seats.

== List ==
| Name | National party | EP Group |
|---|---|---|
| Pedro Aparicio Sánchez | Socialist Workers' Party | PES |
| María Antonia Avilés Perea | People's Party | EPP–ED |
| María del Pilar Ayuso González | People's Party | EPP–ED |
| Enrique Barón Crespo | Socialist Workers' Party | PES |
| Juan José Bayona de Perogordo | People's Party | EPP–ED |
| Luis Berenguer Fuster | Socialist Workers' Party | PES |
| María Luisa Bergaz Conesa | United Left | EUL–NGL |
| Felipe Camisón Asensio | People's Party | EPP–ED |
| Carlos Carnero González | Socialist Workers' Party | PES |
| Alejandro Cercas | Socialist Workers' Party | PES |
| Carmen Cerdeira Morterero | Socialist Workers' Party | PES |
| Joan Colom i Naval | Socialist Workers' Party | PES |
| Rosa M. Díez González | Socialist Workers' Party | PES |
| Bárbara Dührkop Dührkop | Socialist Workers' Party | PES |
| Fernando Fernández Martín | People's Party | EPP–ED |
| Juan Manuel Ferrández Lezaun | | G–EFA |
| Concepció Ferrer | People's Party | EPP–ED |
| Gerardo Galeote Quecedo | People's Party | EPP–ED |
| José Manuel García-Margallo | People's Party | EPP–ED |
| Cristina García-Orcoyen Tormo | People's Party | EPP–ED |
| Salvador Garriga Polledo | People's Party | EPP–ED |
| Carles-Alfred Gasòliba i Böhm | | ELDR |
| José María Gil-Robles Gil-Delgado | People's Party | EPP–ED |
| Koldo Gorostiaga Atxalandabaso | Unity (Basque Country) | NI |
| Cristina Gutiérrez-Cortines | People's Party | EPP–ED |
| Jorge Salvador Hernández Mollar | People's Party | EPP–ED |
| María Esther Herranz García | People's Party | EPP–ED |
| Juan de Dios Izquierdo Collado | Socialist Workers' Party | PES |
| María Izquierdo Rojo | Socialist Workers' Party | PES |
| Salvador Jové Peres | United Left | EUL–NGL |
| Gorka Knörr | | G–EFA |
| Pedro Marset Campos | United Left | EUL–NGL |
| Miguel Angel Martínez Martínez | Socialist Workers' Party | PES |
| Miquel Mayol i Raynal | | G–EFA |
| Manuel Medina Ortega | Socialist Workers' Party | PES |
| íñigo Méndez de Vigo | People's Party | EPP–ED |
| José María Mendiluce Pereiro | Socialist Workers' Party | PES |
| Emilio Menéndez del Valle | Socialist Workers' Party | PES |
| Rosa Miguélez Ramos | Socialist Workers' Party | PES |
| Ana Miranda de Lage | Socialist Workers' Party | PES |
| Enrique Monsonís Domingo | | ELDR |
| Juan Andrés Naranjo Escobar | People's Party | EPP–ED |
| Camilo Nogueira Román | | G–EFA |
| Raimon Obiols i Germà | Socialist Workers' Party | PES |
| Juan Ojeda Sanz | People's Party | EPP–ED |
| Marcelino Oreja Arburúa | People's Party | EPP–ED |
| Josu Ortuondo Larrea | | G–EFA |
| Manuel Pérez Álvarez | People's Party | EPP–ED |
| Fernando Pérez Royo | Socialist Workers' Party | PES |
| José Javier Pomés Ruiz | People's Party | EPP–ED |
| Alonso José Puerta | United Left | EUL–NGL |
| Encarnación Redondo Jiménez | People's Party | EPP–ED |
| Mónica Ridruejo | People's Party | EPP–ED |
| Carlos Ripoll y Martínez de Bedoya | People's Party | EPP–ED |
| María Rodríguez Ramos | Socialist Workers' Party | PES |
| José Ignacio Salafranca Sánchez-Neyra | People's Party | EPP–ED |
| Francisca Sauquillo Pérez del Arco | Socialist Workers' Party | PES |
| María Sornosa Martínez | Socialist Workers' Party | PES |
| Anna Terrón i Cusí | Socialist Workers' Party | PES |
| Jaime Valdivielso de Cué | People's Party | EPP–ED |
| María Elena Valenciano Martínez-Orozco | Socialist Workers' Party | PES |
| Joan Vallvé | | ELDR |
| Daniel Varela Suanzes-Carpegna | People's Party | EPP–ED |
| Alejo Vidal-Quadras Roca | People's Party | EPP–ED |
