= List of members of the European Parliament for Spain, 1987–1989 =

Members of the European Parliament for Spain
| Delegation | (1986) |
| 2nd term | (1987) |
| 3rd term | (1989) |
| 4th term | (1994) |
| 5th term | (1999) |
| 6th term | (2004) |
| 7th term | (2009) |
| 8th term | (2014) |
| 9th term | (2019) |
| 10th term | (2024) |

This is a list of the members of the European Parliament for Spain in the 1984 to 1989 session. See 1987 European Parliament election in Spain for election results.

== List ==
| Name | National party | EP Group |
|---|---|---|
| José Álvarez de Paz | Socialist Workers' Party | SOC |
| Víctor Manuel Arbeloa Muru | Socialist Workers' Party | SOC |
| Enrique Barón Crespo | Socialist Workers' Party | SOC |
| Carlos María Bru Purón | Socialist Workers' Party | SOC |
| José Miguel Bueno Vicente | Socialist Workers' Party | SOC |
| Esteban Caamaño Bernal | Socialist Workers' Party | SOC |
| Jesús Cabezón Alonso | Socialist Workers' Party | SOC |
| José Cabrera Bazan | Socialist Workers' Party | SOC |
| Eusebio Cano Pinto | Socialist Workers' Party | SOC |
| Juan Luis Colino Salamanca | Socialist Workers' Party | SOC |
| Joan Colom i Naval | Socialist Workers' Party | SOC |
| Bárbara Dührkop | Socialist Workers' Party | SOC |
| Ludivina García Arias | Socialist Workers' Party | SOC |
| José Luis Garcia Raya | Socialist Workers' Party | SOC |
| Julián Grimaldos | Socialist Workers' Party | SOC |
| Manuel Medina Ortega | Socialist Workers' Party | SOC |
| Ana Miranda de Lage | Socialist Workers' Party | SOC |
| Fernando Morán López | Socialist Workers' Party | SOC |
| Francisco Oliva Garcia | Socialist Workers' Party | SOC |
| Luis Planas Puchades | Socialist Workers' Party | SOC |
| Josep Pons Grau | Socialist Workers' Party | SOC |
| Juan de Dios Ramírez Heredia | Socialist Workers' Party | SOC |
| Xavier Rubert de Ventós | Socialist Workers' Party | SOC |
| Francisco Javier Sanz Fernández | Socialist Workers' Party | SOC |
| Enrique Sapena Granell | Socialist Workers' Party | SOC |
| Mateo Sierra Bardají | Socialist Workers' Party | SOC |
| José Vázquez Fouz | Socialist Workers' Party | SOC |
| Josep Verde i Aldea | Socialist Workers' Party | SOC |
| José María Alvarez de Eulate Peñaranda | People's Alliance | ED |
| Pedro Argüelles Salaverria | People's Alliance | ED |
| Miguel Arias Cañete | People's Alliance | ED |
| Pío Cabanillas Gallas | People's Alliance | ED |
| Ramón Diaz del Rio Jaudenes | People's Alliance | ED |
| Arturo Juan Escuder Croft | People's Alliance | ED |
| Manuel Fraga Iribarne | People's Alliance | ED |
| Manuel García Amigo | People's Alliance | ED |
| Salvador Garriga Polledo | People's Alliance | ED |
| José María Lafuente López | People's Alliance | ED |
| Carmen Llorca Villaplana | People's Alliance | ED |
| Antonio Navarro | People's Alliance | ED |
| Luis Guillermo Perinat Elio | People's Alliance | ED |
| Carlos Robles Piquer | People's Alliance | ED |
| Domènec Romera i Alcàzar | People's Alliance | ED |
| Fernando Suárez González | People's Alliance | ED |
| José Valverde López | People's Alliance | ED |
| Rafael Calvo Ortega | Democratic and Social Centre | NI |
| José Emilio Cervera Cardona | Democratic and Social Centre | NI |
| José Coderch Planas | Democratic and Social Centre | NI |
| Carmen Díez de Rivera Icaza | Democratic and Social Centre | NI |
| Federico Mayor Zaragoza | Democratic and Social Centre | NI |
| Raúl Morodo Leoncio | Democratic and Social Centre | NI |
| Eduard Punset i Casals | Democratic and Social Centre | NI |
| José María Montero Zabala | Popular Unity | NI |
| Antoni Gutiérrez Díaz | United Left | COM |
| Fernando Pérez Royo | United Left | COM |
| Alonso José Puerta | United Left | COM |
| Carles-Alfred Gasòliba i Böhm | Convergence and Union | LDR |
| Joaquim Muns Albuixech | Convergence and Union | LDR |
| Concepció Ferrer | Convergence and Union | EPP |
| Juan Carlos Garaikoetxea Urriza | Basque Solidarity | RBW |
