= List of members of the European Parliament for Spain, 2004–2009 =

Members of the European Parliament for Spain
Delegation	(1986)
2nd term	(1987)
3rd term	(1989)
4th term	(1994)
5th term	(1999)
6th term	(2004)
7th term	(2009)
8th term	(2014)
9th term	(2019)
10th term	(2024)

This is a list of the 54 members of the European Parliament for Spain in the 2004 to 2009 session.

== List ==
Name	National party	EP group
Inés Ayala Sender	Socialist Workers' Party	PES
María del Pilar Ayuso González	People's Party	EPP–ED
María Badía i Cutchet	Socialists' Party of Catalonia	PES
Enrique Barón Crespo	Socialist Workers' Party	PES
Josep Borrell Fontelles	Socialist Workers' Party	PES
Joan Calabuig Rull	Socialist Workers' Party	PES
Carlos Carnero González	Socialist Workers' Party	PES
Alejandro Cercas Alonso	Socialist Workers' Party	PES
Luis de Grandes Pascual	People's Party	EPP–ED
Pilar del Castillo Vera	People's Party	EPP–ED
Agustín Díaz de Mera García Consuegra	People's Party	EPP–ED
Rosa Díez González	Socialist Workers' Party	PES
Bárbara Dührkop Dührkop	Socialist Workers' Party	PES
Fernando Fernández Martín	People's Party	EPP–ED
Carmen Fraga Estévez	People's Party	EPP–ED
Gerardo Galeote Quecedo	People's Party	EPP–ED
José García-Margallo y Marfil	People's Party	EPP–ED
Iratxe García Pérez	Socialist Workers' Party	PES
Salvador Garriga Polledo	People's Party	EPP–ED
Ignasi Guardans Cambó		ALDE
Cristina Gutiérrez-Cortines	People's Party	EPP–ED
David Hammerstein Mintz		G–EFA
María Esther Herranz García	People's Party	EPP–ED
Luis Herrero-Tejedor Algar	People's Party	EPP–ED
Carlos José Iturgáiz Angulo	People's Party	EPP–ED
Mikel Irujo Amezaga		G–EFA
Antonio López-Istúriz White		EPP–ED
Miguel Angel Martínez Martínez	Socialist Workers' Party	PES
Antonio Masip Hidalgo	Socialist Workers' Party	PES
Ana Mato Adrover		EPP–ED
Jaime María Mayor Oreja		EPP–ED
Manuel Medina Ortega	Socialist Workers' Party	PES
Íñigo Méndez de Vigo		EPP–ED
Emilio Menéndez del Valle	Socialist Workers' Party	PES
Willy Meyer Pleite		EUL–NGL
Rosa Miguélez Ramos	Socialist Workers' Party	PES
Francisco José Millán Mon		EPP–ED
Cristóbal Montoro Romero		EPP–ED
Javier Moreno Sánchez	Socialist Workers' Party	PES
Raimon Obiols i Germà	Socialist Workers' Party	PES
Josu Ortuondo Larrea		ALDE
Francisca Pleguezuelos Aguilar	Socialist Workers' Party	PES
José Javier Pomés Ruiz		EPP–ED
Teresa Riera Madurell	Socialist Workers' Party	PES
Raül Romeva Rueda		G–EFA
Luisa Fernanda Rudi Ubeda		EPP–ED
José Salafranca Sánchez-Neira		EPP–ED
María Isabel Salinas García	Socialist Workers' Party	PES
Antolín Sánchez Presedo	Socialist Workers' Party	PES
María Sornosa Martínez	Socialist Workers' Party	PES
María Elena Valenciano Martínez-Orozco	Socialist Workers' Party	PES
Daniel Varela Suanzes-Carpegna		EPP–ED
Alejo Vidal-Quadras Roca		EPP–ED
Luis Yañez-Barnuevo García	Socialist Workers' Party	PES
