= List of members of the European Parliament for Spain, 2009–2014 =

Members of the European Parliament for Spain
Delegation	(1986)
2nd term	(1987)
3rd term	(1989)
4th term	(1994)
5th term	(1999)
6th term	(2004)
7th term	(2009)
8th term	(2014)
9th term	(2019)
10th term	(2024)

This is a list of the 50 members of the European Parliament for Spain in the 2009 to 2014 session. Two people from Socialist Workers' Party, one from Coalition for Europe and one from People's Party entered the Parliament in December 2011, bringing the number of Spanish MEPs back to 54.

== List ==
Name	National party	EP Group
Pablo Arias Echeverría	People's Party	EPP
María del Pilar Ayuso González	People's Party	EPP
Luis de Grandes Pascual	People's Party	EPP
Pilar del Castillo Vera	People's Party	EPP
Agustín Díaz de Mera García Consuegra	People's Party	EPP
Rosa Estaràs Ferragut	People's Party	EPP
Carmen Fraga Estévez	People's Party	EPP
José García-Margallo y Marfil	People's Party	EPP
Salvador Garriga Polledo	People's Party	EPP
Cristina Gutiérrez-Cortines	People's Party	EPP
María Esther Herranz García	People's Party	EPP
Santiago Fisas Ayxelá	People's Party	EPP
Carlos José Iturgaiz Angulo	People's Party	EPP
Teresa Jiménez-Becerril	People's Party	EPP
Verónica Lope Fontagne	People's Party	EPP
Antonio López-Istúriz White	People's Party	EPP
Gabriel Mato Adrover	People's Party	EPP
Jaime Mayor Oreja	People's Party	EPP
Francisco José Millán Mon	People's Party	EPP
Íñigo Méndez de Vigo Montojo	People's Party	EPP
José Salafranca Sánchez-Neira	People's Party	EPP
Alejo Vidal-Quadras Roca	People's Party / Vox	EPP
Pablo Zalba Bidegain	People's Party	EPP
Eva Ortiz Vilella	People's Party	EPP
Salvador Sedó	Coalition for Europe ( Democratic Union of Catalonia)	EPP
Magdalena Álvarez	Socialist Workers' Party	S&D
Josefa Andrés Barea	Socialist Workers' Party	S&D
Inés Ayala	Socialist Workers' Party	S&D
María Badía	Socialist Workers' Party	S&D
Alejandro Cercas	Socialist Workers' Party	S&D
Ricardo Cortés Lastra	Socialist Workers' Party	S&D
Iratxe García	Socialist Workers' Party	S&D
Eider Gardiazabal Rubial	Socialist Workers' Party	S&D
Enrique Guerrero Salom	Socialist Workers' Party	S&D
Ramón Jáuregui Atondo	Socialist Workers' Party	S&D
Juan Fernando López Aguilar	Socialist Workers' Party	S&D
Miguel Ángel Martínez Martínez	Socialist Workers' Party	S&D
Antonio Masip Hidalgo	Socialist Workers' Party	S&D
Emilio Menéndez	Socialist Workers' Party	S&D
María Muñiz de Urquiza	Socialist Workers' Party	S&D
Raimon Obiols	Socialist Workers' Party	S&D
Juan Andrés Perelló Rodríguez	Socialist Workers' Party	S&D
Teresa Riera	Socialist Workers' Party	S&D
Carmen Romero López	Socialist Workers' Party	S&D
Antolín Sánchez	Socialist Workers' Party	S&D
Luis Yáñez-Barnuevo	Socialist Workers' Party	S&D
Vicente Miguel Garcés Ramón	Socialist Workers' Party	S&D
Dolores García-Hierro	Socialist Workers' Party	S&D
Izaskun Bilbao Barandica	Coalition for Europe ( Basque Nationalist Party)	ALDE
Ramon Tremosa	Coalition for Europe ( Democratic Convergence of Catalonia)	ALDE
Francisco Sosa Wagner	Union, Progress and Democracy	NI
Willy Meyer Pleite	The Left ( United Left)	EUL–NGL
Raül Romeva	The Left ( Initiative for Catalonia Greens)	G–EFA
Oriol Junqueras	Europe of the Peoples–Greens ( Republican Left of Catalonia)	G–EFA

== See also ==
- Members of the European Parliament 2009–2014
- List of members of the European Parliament, 2009–2014 - for a full alphabetical list
- 2009 European Parliament election
