= List of members of the European Parliament for Spain, 2014–2019 =

Members of the European Parliament for Spain
Delegation	(1986)
2nd term	(1987)
3rd term	(1989)
4th term	(1994)
5th term	(1999)
6th term	(2004)
7th term	(2009)
8th term	(2014)
9th term	(2019)
10th term	(2024)

This is a list of members of the European Parliament for Spain elected at the 2014 European Parliament election in Spain, and who served in the Eighth European Parliament.

== List ==
Elected legislators Electors covering vacant seats
#	Name	List
1	Miguel Arias Cañete	PP
2	Elena Valenciano Martínez-Orozco	PSOE
3	Esteban González Pons	PP
4	Ramón Jáuregui Atondo	PSOE
5	Willy Enrique Meyer Pleite	IP
6	María Teresa Jiménez Becerril Barrio	PP
7	Pablo Iglesias Turrión	Podemos
8	Soledad Cabezón Ruiz	PSOE
9	Luis de Grandes Pascual	PP
10	Francisco Sosa Wagner	UPyD
11	Juan Fernando López Aguilar	PSOE
12	Ramón Tremosa i Balcells	CEU
13	Pilar del Castillo Vera	PP
14	Paloma López Bermejo	IP
15	Iratxe García Pérez	PSOE
16	Ramón Luis Valcárcel	PP
17	Josep Maria Terricabras i Nogueras	EPDD
18	María Teresa Rodríguez-Rubio Vázquez	Podemos
19	Javier López Fernández	PSOE
20	María Rosa Estarás Ferragut	PP
21	Ernest Urtasun Domenech	IP
22	Inmaculada Rodríguez-Piñero Fernández	PSOE
23	Francisco José Millán Mon	PP
24	María Teresa Pagazaurtundúa Ruiz	UPyD
25	Javier Nart Peñalver	C's
26	Pablo Zalba Bidegain	PP
27	Enrique Guerrero Salom	PSOE
28	Izaskun Bilbao Barandica	CEU
29	Carlos Jiménez Villarejo	Podemos
30	Verónica Lope Fontagne	PP
31	Eider Gardiazábal Rubial	PSOE
32	Marina Albiol Guzmán	IP
33	Antonio López-Istúriz White	PP
34	José Blanco López	PSOE
35	Santiago Fisas Ayxelà	PP
36	Fernando Maura Barandiarán	UPyD
37	Clara Eugenia Aguilera García	PSOE
38	Josu Juaristi	LPD
39	Gabriel Mato	PP
40	Ernest Maragall i Mira	EPDD
41	Maria Lidia Senra Rodríguez	IP
42	María Dolores "Lola" Sánchez Caldentey	Podemos
43	Jordi Sebastià Talavera	PE
44	Sergio Gutiérrez Prieto	PSOE
45	María del Pilar Ayuso González	PP
46	Francesc de Paula Gambús i Millet	CEU
47	Inés Ayala Sender	PSOE
48	María Esther Herranz García	PP
49	Ángela Vallina	IP
50	Jonás Fernández Álvarez	PSOE
51	Agustín Díaz de Mera García Consuegra	PP
52	Beatriz Becerra Basterrechea	UPyD
53	Pablo Echenique Robba	Podemos
54	Juan Carlos Girauta Vidal	C's
-	Javier Couso Permuy	IP
-	Tania González Peñas	Podemos
-	Carlos Iturgaiz Angulo	PP
-	Enrique Calvet Chambon	UPyD
-	Miguel Urbán Crespo	Podemos
-	Estefanía Torres Martínez	Podemos
-	Xabier Benito Ziluaga	Podemos
-	Teresa Giménez Barbat	UPyD
-	Carolina Punset Bannel	C's
-	Florent Marcellesi	PE
-	José Ignacio Salafranca Sánchez-Neyra	PP
-	Jordi Solé i Ferrando	EPDD
-	Ana Miranda Paz	LPD
