= List of members of the European Parliament for Spain, 2019–2024 =

Members of the European Parliament for Spain
Delegation	(1986)
2nd term	(1987)
3rd term	(1989)
4th term	(1994)
5th term	(1999)
6th term	(2004)
7th term	(2009)
8th term	(2014)
9th term	(2019)
10th term	(2024)

This is a list of members of the European Parliament for Spain elected at the 2019 European Parliament election in Spain, and who served in the ninth European Parliament.

== Elected members ==
On the Spanish Socialist Workers' Party list: (S&D)

1. Iratxe García
2. Lina Gálvezur
3. Javi López Fernández
4. Inmaculada Rodríguez-Piñero
5. Iban García del Blanco
6. Eider Gardiazabal
7. Nicolás González Casares
8. Cristina Maestre
9. César Luena
10. Clara Aguilera García
11. Ignacio Sánchez Amor
12. Mónica Silvana González
13. Juan Fernando López Aguilar
14. Adriana Maldonado López (resigned on 17 August 2023)
  - Laura Ballarin Cereza (joined on 6 September 2023)
15. Jonás Fernández
16. Alícia Homs Ginel
17. Javier Moreno Sánchez
18. Isabel García Muñoz
19. Domènec Ruiz Devesa
20. Estrella Durá Ferrandis

On the People's Party list: (EPP Group)

1. Dolors Montserrat
2. Esteban González Pons (resigned on 17 August 2023)
  - Ana Collado Jiménez (joined on 6 September 2023)
3. Antonio López-Istúriz White
4. Juan Ignacio Zoido
5. Pilar del Castillo
6. Javier Zarzalejos
7. José Manuel García-Margallo
8. Francisco José Millán Mon
9. Rosa Estaràs
10. Isabel Benjumea
11. Pablo Arias Echeverría
12. Leopoldo López Gil

On the Citizens – Party of the Citizenry list: (Renew)

1. Luis Garicano (resigned on 1 September 2022)
  - Eva-Maria Poptcheva (joined on 15 September 2022)
2. Maite Pagazaurtundúa
3. Soraya Rodríguez
4. Javier Nart (left in 2019)
5. José Ramón Bauzà
6. Jordi Cañas Pérez
7. Susana Solís Pérez

On the Unidas Podemos list: (GUE–NGL)

1. María Eugenia Rodríguez Palop
2. Sira Rego (resigned on 20 November 2023)
  - Patricia Caro (joined on 30 November 2023)
3. Ernest Urtasun (in the Greens-EFA; resigned on 20 November 2023)
  - Esther Sanz Selva (joined on 21 December 2023)
4. Idoia Villanueva
5. Miguel Urbán
6. Manu Pineda

On the Vox list: (ECR)

1. Jorge Buxadé
2. Mazaly Aguilar
3. Hermann Tertsch
4. Margarita de la Pisa Carrión

On the Ahora Repúblicas list: (Greens-EFA)

1. Oriol Junqueras
2. Pernando Barrena (in the GUE–NGL; resigned on 2 September 2022)
  - Ana Miranda Paz (joined on 5 September 2022)
3. Diana Riba

On Together for Europe list: (Non-Inscrits)

1. Carles Puigdemont
2. Antoni Comín
3. Clara Ponsatí i Obiols (joined on 1 February 2020)

On the Coalition for a Solidary Europe list: (Renew)

1. Izaskun Bilbao Barandica
