= List of members of the European Parliament for Spain, 2024–2029 =

Members of the European Parliament for Spain
Delegation	(1986)
2nd term	(1987)
3rd term	(1989)
4th term	(1994)
5th term	(1999)
6th term	(2004)
7th term	(2009)
8th term	(2014)
9th term	(2019)
10th term	(2024)

This is a list of members of the European Parliament for Spain elected at the 2024 European Parliament election in Spain, and who served in the tenth European Parliament.

== List ==
MEP	National party		EP Group		In office		Birth date	Notes	Ref.
MEP	Elected	Current	Initial	Current	Since	Until	Birth date	Notes	Ref.
Dolors Montserrat	PP	PP	EPP	EPP	2 July 2019		18 September 1973	PP 2024 list leader	
Carmen Crespo	PP	PP	EPP	EPP	16 July 2024		8 December 1966	Chair of the Committee on Fisheries	
Alma Ezcurra	PP	PP	EPP	EPP	16 July 2024		11 December 1986		
Esteban González Pons	PP	PP	EPP	EPP	16 July 2024 (Note: Esteban González Pons also served as an MEP between 2014 and 2023.)		21 August 1964	Vice-President of the European Parliament	
Fernando Navarrete	PP	PP	EPP	EPP	16 July 2024		24 January 1976		
Javier Zarzalejos	PP	PP	EPP	EPP	2 July 2019		6 June 1960	Chair of the Committee on Civil Liberties, Justice and Home Affairs	
Rosa Estaràs	PP	PP	EPP	EPP	14 July 2009		21 October 1965		
Francisco Millán Mon	PP	PP	EPP	EPP	20 July 2004		8 March 1955		
Pilar del Castillo	PP	PP	EPP	EPP	20 July 2004		31 July 1952		
Adrián Vázquez Lázara	PP	PP	EPP	EPP	1 February 2020		5 May 1982		
Gabriel Mato	PP	PP	EPP	EPP	14 July 2009		29 April 1961		
Raúl de la Hoz Quintano	PP	PP	EPP	EPP	16 July 2024		4 May 1973		
Esther Herranz García	PP	PP	EPP	EPP	16 July 2024 (Note: Esther Herranz García also served as an MEP between 2002 and 2019.)		3 July 1969		
Juan Ignacio Zoido	PP	PP	EPP	EPP	2 July 2019		21 January 1957		
Susana Solís Pérez	PP	PP	EPP	EPP	2 July 2019		21 December 1971		
Pablo Arias Echeverría	PP	PP	EPP	EPP	2 July 2019 (Note: Pablo Arias Echevarría also served as an MEP between 2009 and 2014.)		30 June 1970		
Antonio López-Istúriz	PP	PP	EPP	EPP	20 July 2004		1 April 1970		
Isabel Benjumea	PP	PP	EPP	EPP	2 July 2019		5 September 1982		
Borja Giménez Larraz	PP	PP	EPP	EPP	16 July 2024		25 June 1983		
Elena Nevado	PP	PP	EPP	EPP	16 July 2024		26 January 1967		
Nicolás Pascual de la Parte	PP	PP	EPP	EPP	16 July 2024		21 April 1959		
Maravillas Abadía Jover	PP	PP	EPP	EPP	16 July 2024		8 December 1981		
Iratxe García	PSOE	PSOE	S&D	S&D	20 July 2004		7 October 1974	S&D leader	
Javi López Fernández	PSOE	PSC	S&D	S&D	1 July 2014		11 November 1985	Vice-President of the European Parliament	
Hana Jalloul	PSOE	PSOE	S&D	S&D	16 July 2024		8 April 1978		
Javier Moreno	PSOE	PSOE	S&D	S&D	2 July 2019		12 March 1965		
Lina Gálvez	PSOE	PSOE	S&D	S&D	2 July 2019		13 June 1969	Chair of the Committee on Women's Rights and Gender Equality	
Jonás Fernández	PSOE	PSOE	S&D	S&D	1 July 2014		8 January 1979		
Leire Pajín	PSOE	PSOE	S&D	S&D	16 July 2024		16 September 1976		
César Luena	PSOE	PSOE	S&D	S&D	2 July 2019		29 October 1980		
Idoia Mendia	PSOE	PSOE	S&D	S&D	16 July 2024		27 October 1965		
Nicolás González Casares	PSOE	PSOE	S&D	S&D	2 July 2019		20 July 1972		
Cristina Maestre	PSOE	PSOE	S&D	S&D	2 July 2019		27 July 1975		
Juan Fernando López	PSOE	PSOE	S&D	S&D	14 July 2009		10 June 1961		
Sandra Gómez	PSOE	PSOE	S&D	S&D	16 July 2024		23 July 1985		
Nacho Sánchez Amor	PSOE	PSOE	S&D	S&D	2 July 2019		15 May 1969		
Laura Ballarin	PSOE	PSC	S&D	S&D	6 September 2023		19 July 1984		
Marcos Ros	PSOE	PSOE	S&D	S&D	2 July 2019		24 March 1974		
Rosa María Serrano Sierra	PSOE	PSOE	S&D	S&D	16 July 2024		11 November 1969		
Elena Sancho	PSOE	PSOE	S&D	S&D	16 July 2024		26 January 1989		
José Cepeda	PSOE	PSOE	S&D	S&D	16 July 2024		19 July 1968		
Alícia Homs Ginel	PSOE	PSOE	S&D	S&D	2 July 2019		15 October 1993	Elected after Teresa Ribera, PSOE 2024 list leader, refused to take her seat	
Jorge Buxadé	Vox	Vox	PfE	PfE	2 July 2019		16 June 1975	Vox 2024 list leader	
Hermann Tertsch	Vox	Vox	PfE	PfE	2 July 2019		9 April 1958		
Juan Carlos Girauta	Vox	Vox	PfE	PfE	16 July 2024 (Note: Juan Carlos Girauta also served as an MEP between 2014 and 2016.)		12 March 1961		
Mireia Borrás	Vox	Vox	PfE	PfE	16 July 2024		14 October 1986		
Margarita de la Pisa Carrión	Vox	Vox	PfE	PfE	1 February 2020		19 September 1976		
Jorge Martín Frías	Vox	Vox	PfE	PfE	16 July 2024		8 April 1976		
Diana Riba	AR	ERC	G/EFA	G/EFA	2 July 2019		21 February 1975	AR 2024 list leader	
Pernando Barrena	AR	EH Bildu	Left	Left	16 July 2024 (Note: Pernando Barrena also served as an MEP between 2019 and 2022.)		1 November 1965		
Ana Miranda Paz	AR	BNG	G/EFA	G/EFA	5 September 2022 (Note: Ana Miranda Paz also served as an MEP between 2012–2013 and 2018–2019.)		2 May 1971		
Estrella Galán	Sumar	MS	Left	Left	16 July 2024		24 April 1971	Sumar 2024 list leader	
Jaume Asens	Sumar	Comuns	G/EFA	G/EFA	16 July 2024		29 March 1972		
Vicent Marzà	Sumar	Més	G/EFA	G/EFA	16 July 2024		3 March 1983		
Alvise Pérez	SALF	SALF	NI	NI	16 July 2024		26 February 1990	SALF 2024 list leader	
Diego Solier	SALF	IND	NI	ECR	16 July 2024		26 April 1980	Left SALF on 6 May 2025.	
Nora Junco	SALF	IND	NI	ECR	16 July 2024		31 January 1975	Left SALF on 6 May 2025.	
Irene Montero	Podemos	Podemos	Left	Left	16 July 2024		13 February 1988	Podemos 2024 list leader	
Isabel Serra	Podemos	Podemos	Left	Left	16 July 2024		15 August 1989		
Toni Comín	Junts+	MESCat	NI	NI	2 July 2019		7 March 1971	Junts+ 2024 list leader. His seat was vacant as of July 2024 after his election was not certified in Spain. He took up his seat on 22 October 2026.	
Oihane Agirregoitia	CEUS	EAJ/PNV	RE	RE	16 July 2024		18 April 1980	CEUS 2024 list leader	
