= Nationalist Coalition =

Nationalist Coalition (or variants) was the name adopted by various electoral coalitions formed in Spain for elections to the European Parliament. The coalitions were headed by the Basque Nationalist Party:

- Nationalist Coalition (1989), in the 1989 election.
- Nationalist Coalition (1994), in the 1994 election.
- Nationalist Coalition–Europe of the Peoples, in the 1999 election (combined with Europe of the Peoples).
