= Eva-Maria Poptcheva =

Spanish politician

Eva-Maria Poptcheva MEP
- Ева-Мария Попчева
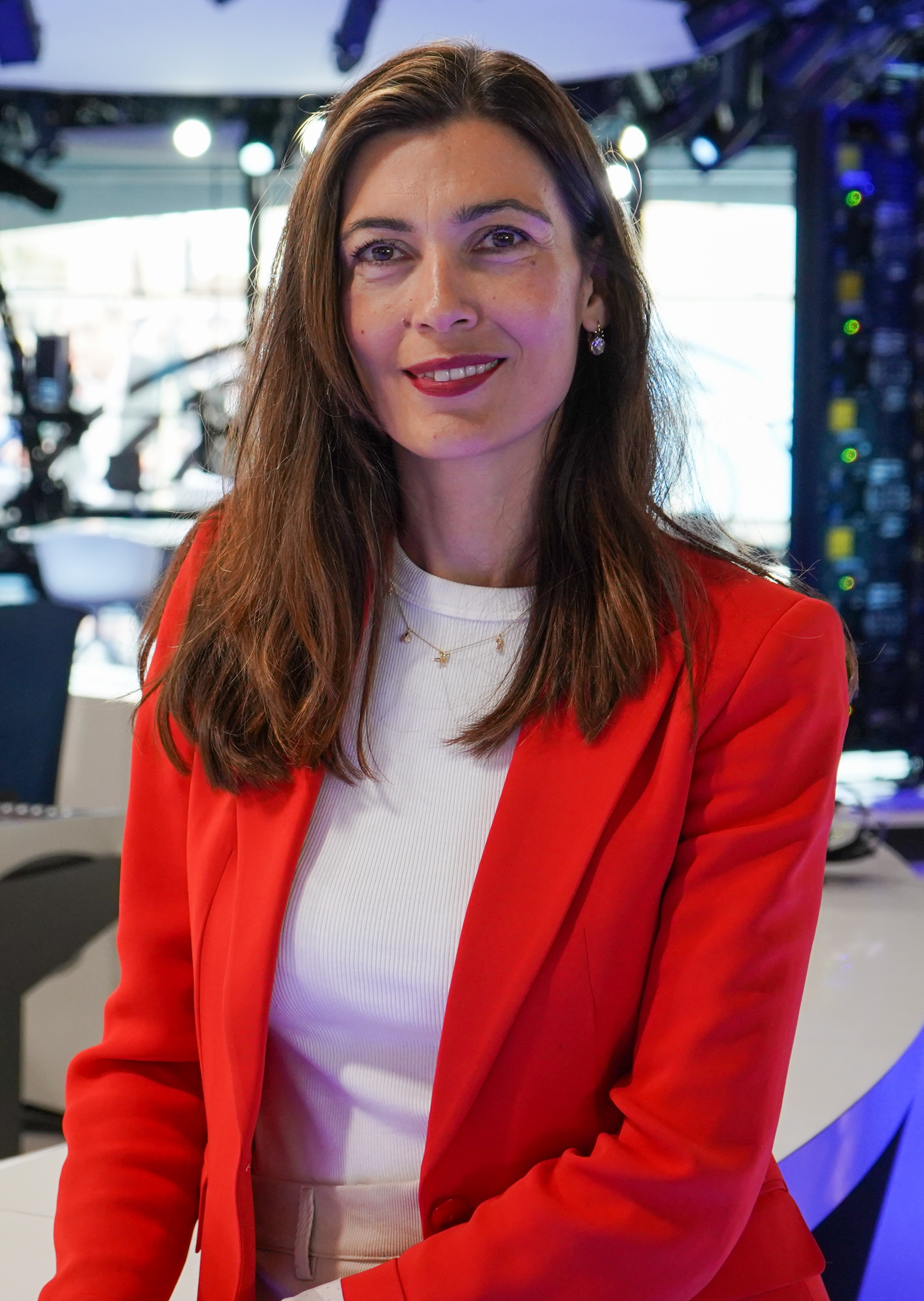

Member of the European Parliament for Spain
- In office 15 September 2022 – 9 June 2024
- Preceded by: Luis Garicano

Personal details
- Born: 17 October 1979 (age 47) Plovdiv, Bulgaria
- Citizenship: Bulgaria
- Party: People's Party (2024–present)
- Other political affiliations: Citizens (until 2024)
- Education: University of Freiburg

Eva-Maria Poptcheva (born 17 October 1979) is a Spanish politician who served as a Member of the European Parliament for the Citizens party from 2022 until 2024.

== Early life and education ==
Poptcheva was born in Bulgaria to parents of Bulgarian and German origins. Her father is a lawyer and her mother - an engineer.

She studied law at the University of Freiburg, Germany, before completing her PhD in constitutional law at the Autonomous University of Barcelona, Spain.

She speaks Bulgarian, German, Spanish, Catalan, English, and French.

== Early career ==
Following her graduation, Poptcheva worked as a lawyer in both Spain and Germany, before becoming a lecturer in Constitutional and EU law at the Autonomous University of Barcelona in Spain. She then worked as a policy analyst at the European Parliamentary Research Service and then as a member of the Office of the then Secretary-General of the European parliament, Klaus Welle. She was a member of the inter-institutional Secretariat of the Conference on the Future of the European Union and then went on to head the European Parliament's Legislative Affairs Unit.

In 2014 her book Multilevel Citizenship: The Right to Consular Protection of EU Citizens Abroad, was published.

== Political career ==
Poptcheva became an MEP in September 2022. In addition, she was Ciudadanos' secretary for the party programme.

In parliament, Poptcheva served on the Committee on Economic and Monetary Affairs, first as a member and then as vice-chair, and on the Committee for Budgetary Affairs. She was co-rapporteur for the establishment of the EU Anti-Money-Laundering Authority (AMLA) and succeeded in choosing for the first time ever the seat of an EU agency by a joint decision of Parliament and Council. MEP Poptcheva was also shadow rapporteur for the revision of the Anti-Money-Laundering Directive and for the Listing Act.

Since 2023, Poptcheva has been part of the Centre for European Policy Studies/Heinrich Böll Foundation High-Level Group on Bolstering EU Democracy, chaired by Kalypso Nicolaïdis.

== See also ==
- List of members of the European Parliament for Spain, 2019–2024
