= María Teresa Estevan Bolea =

Spanish politician

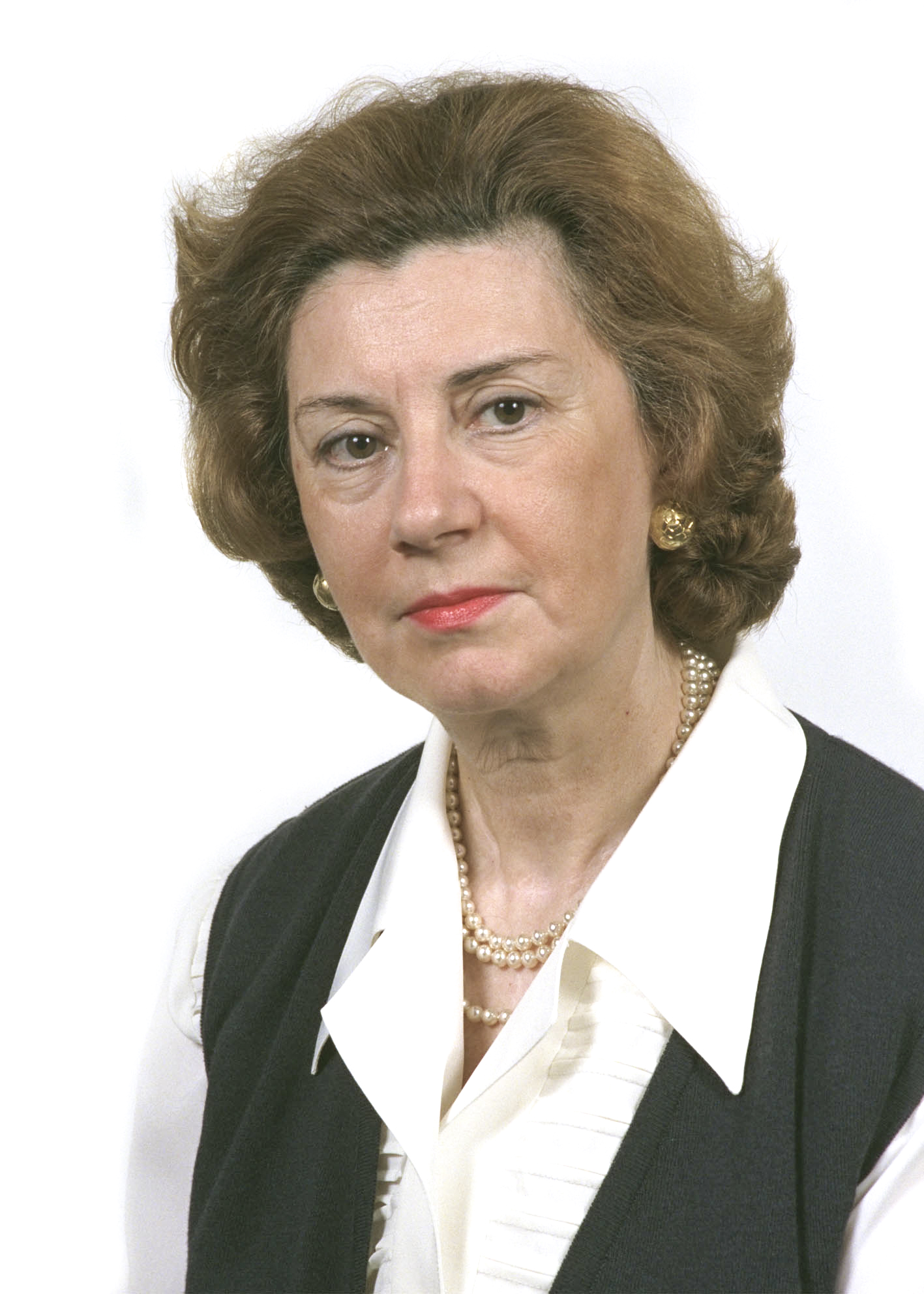
- Estevan Bolea in 1994

Member of the European Parliament
- In office 1994 – 20 July 1999
- Constituency: Spain

Personal details
- Born: 26 October 1936 (age 89) Huesca, Spain
- Party: People's Party
- Education: ETSEIB

María Teresa Estevan Bolea (born 26 October 1936) is a Spanish engineer and politician. She was the first woman in the State Corps of Industrial Engineers, and the third woman in Spain to obtain the title of Industrial Engineer (in 1968). In 2018, she received the "Women in Engineering" global award, from the World Federation of Engineering Organizations (WFEO)

== Life ==
She graduated from the School of Industrial Engineering of Barcelona, where she specialized in welding and environmental engineering.

From 1968 to 1975, she worked in the General Directorate of Energy, beginning the process of the construction of nuclear power plants in Spain.

She joined the People's Party; she was elected deputy for Madrid, in the 1986 and 1989 Spanish general elections. In 1994, she was elected to the European Parliament.

From 2012 to 2016, she was Dean of the Official College of Industrial Engineers of Madrid.
