= Mercedes de la Merced =

Spanish politician (1960–2013)

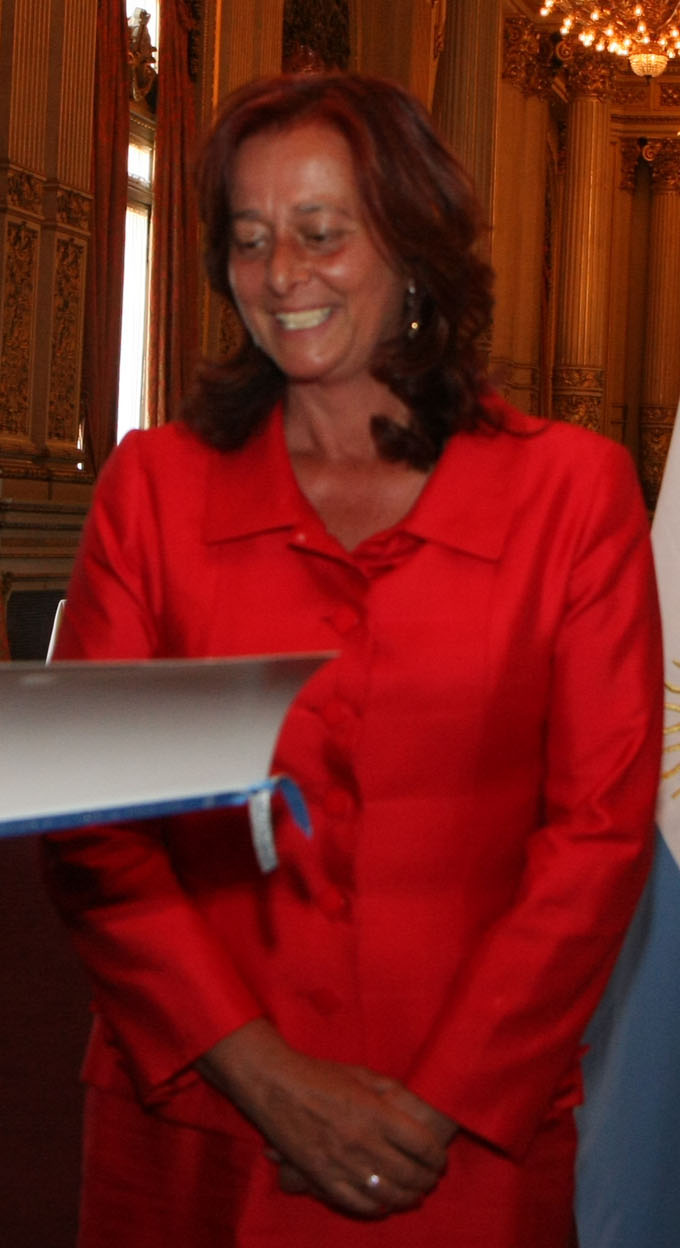

Mercedes de la Merced Monge (31 October 1960 – 5 May 2013) was a Spanish People's Party (PP) politician. She was a councillor on Madrid City Council from 1991 to 2003, and a Member of the European Parliament from 1994 to 1999.

== Biography ==
Born in Soria, Castile and León, De la Merced joined the Union of the Democratic Centre (UCD) at the age of 15. In 1979, she ran unsuccessfully in the local and general elections. After graduating in Philosophy and Letters from the University of Zaragoza she worked within the Junta of Castile and León under regional president José María Aznar, moving to Madrid in February 1990 shortly after his move to national politics. There, she was made the PP's National Secretary of Municipal and Autonomous Politics.

De la Merced was a member of the City Council of Madrid from 1991 to 2003, serving as first deputy mayor to José María Álvarez del Manzano for the final three years. She was also a Member of the European Parliament from 1994 to 1999. In 1996, she became secretary general of the Union of Ibero-American Capital Cities (UCCI).

De la Merced was also an advisor to Caja Madrid from 1997, and to Bankia. In these roles, she was implicated in the "Black Cards scandal", in which credit cards issued for business were used for personal luxury purchases, unknown to the treasury. Her total spending from 2003 to 2011 came to €287,927.52.

On 5 May 2013, De la Merced died of cancer at the age of 52.
