= José Manuel Duarte Cendán =

Spanish politician (1936–2022)

Member of the European Parliament
- In office 10 September 1990 – 18 July 1994
- Constituency: Spain
- In office 1 January 1986 – 5 July 1987
- Constituency: Spain

Member of the Senate of Spain
- In office 1977–1986

Personal details
- Born: 11 August 1936 Madrid, Spain
- Died: 22 November 2022 (aged 86)
- Party: PSOE
- Education: University of Cádiz
- Occupation: Psychiatrist

José Manuel Duarte Cendán (11 August 1936 – 22 November 2022) was a Spanish psychiatrist and politician. A member of the Spanish Socialist Workers' Party, he served in the Senate from 1977 to 1986 and in the European Parliament from 1986 to 1987 and again from 1990 to 1994.

Duarte died on 22 November 2022 at the age of 86.
