= Rosa Miguélez =

Spanish politician

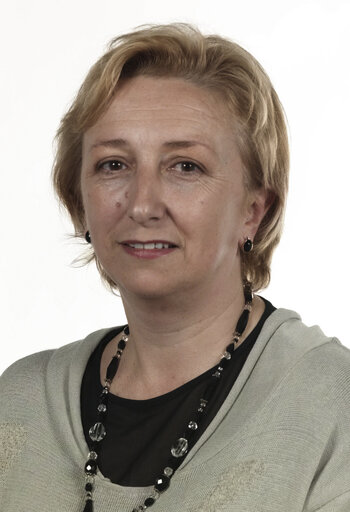
Miguélez in 1999

Rosa Miguélez Ramos (born August 27, 1953 in Ferrol) is a Spanish politician and Member of the European Parliament for the Spanish Socialist Workers' Party, part of the Party of European Socialists.

== Bibliography ==
- "Rosa Miguélez Ramos". Delegación Socialista Española en el Parlamento Europeo (in Spanish). Archived from the original on 7 August 2011.
- "6th parliamentary term, Miguélez Ramos Rosa". Reports of the European Parliament.
