= Domingo Romera =

Spanish politician (1936–2022)

Member of the European Parliament
- In office 1 January 1986 – 18 July 1994
- Constituency: Spain

Member of the Senate of Spain
- In office 27 June 1984 – 23 April 1986

Member of the Parliament of Catalonia
- In office 1984–1988

Personal details
- Born: Domingo Romera Alcázar; 26 May 1936 Barcelona, Spain
- Died: 6 April 2022 (aged 85) Lleida, Spain
- Party: AP; PP
- Education: IESE Business School

Domingo Romera Alcázar (26 May 1936 – 6 April 2022) was a Spanish politician. A member of the People's Alliance and later the People's Party, he served in the Senate of Spain from 1984 to 1986 and in the European Parliament from 1986 to 1994. He died in Lleida on 6 April 2022 at the age of 85.
