= Fernando Morán (politician) =

Spanish diplomat and politician (1926–2020)

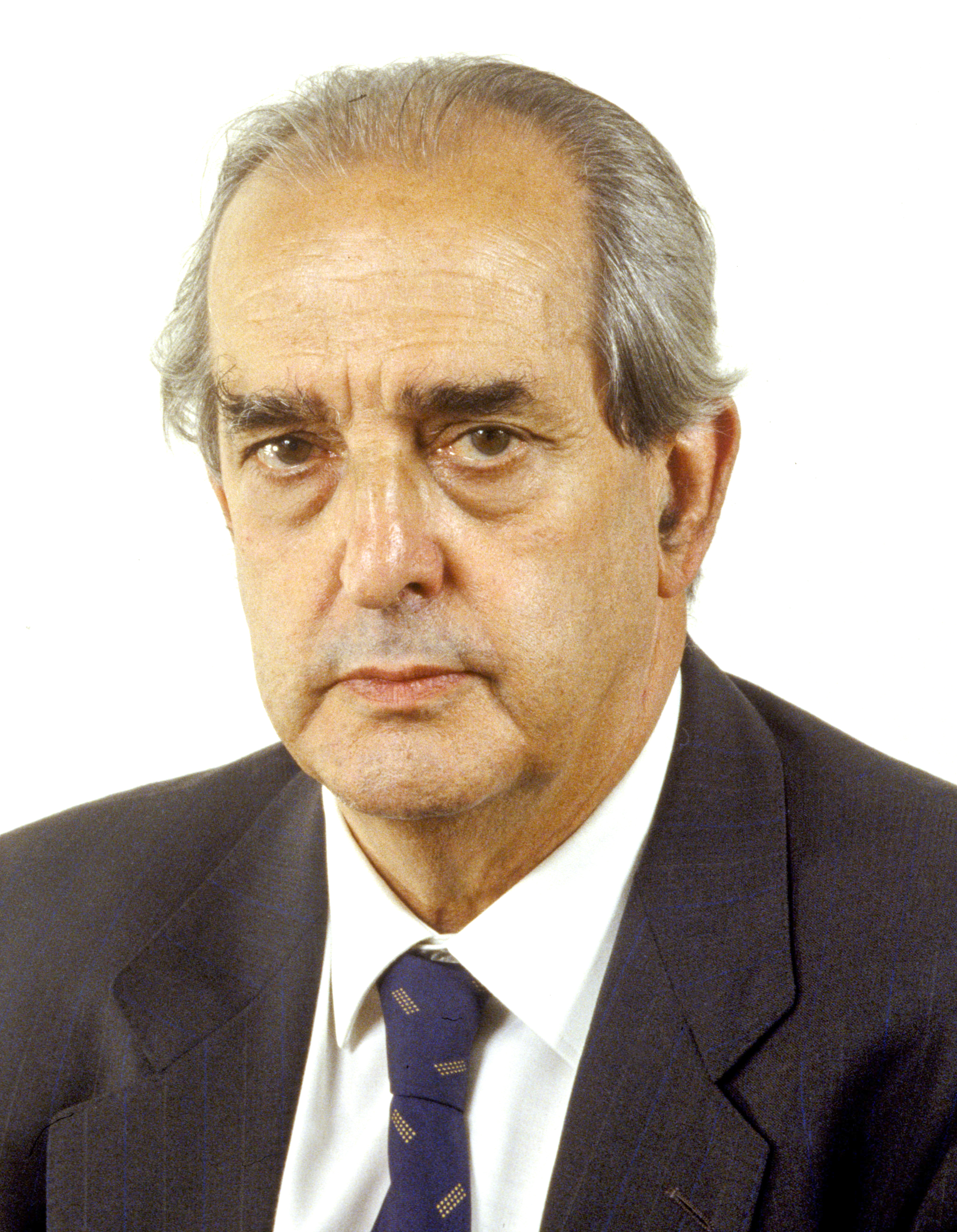
- Morán in 1994

Minister of Foreign Affairs
- In office 2 December 1982 – 4 July 1985
- Prime Minister: Felipe González
- Preceded by: José Pedro Pérez-Llorca
- Succeeded by: Francisco Fernández Ordóñez

Personal details
- Born: Fernando Morán López; 25 March 1926 Avilés, Spain
- Died: 19 February 2020 (aged 93) Madrid, Spain
- Party: People's Socialist Party (formerly); Spanish Socialist Workers Party
- Children: 3
- Education: London School of Economics

Fernando Morán (25 March 1926 – 19 February 2020) was a Spanish diplomat and politician who served as minister of foreign affairs from 1982 to 1985 in the first government of Felipe González. After completing his studies in Madrid, Paris and London, Morán pursued a career as a diplomat. A member of the Group of Salamanca around Enrique Tierno Galván, in 1967 he was a co-founder of the Socialist Party of the Interior, that would become the People's Socialist Party in 1974.

== Early life and education ==
Morán was born in Avilés, Asturias, on 25 March 1926. He received a degree in law and economy. He attended the Institute of International Studies in Paris and London School of Economics.

== Career ==
Morán was a career diplomat. He held several diplomatic and consular posts in Buenos Aires, Pretoria and Lisbon. He was also consul general in London under the ambassadorship of Manuel Fraga. Morán served as general director of Foreign Policy for Africa and Continental Asia.

Morán turned to politics in 1974, joining Enrique Tierno Galván's opposition group, the Popular Socialist Party, and established "Grupo Tierno" in Salamanca during the Franco era. Then he became a member of the Spanish Socialist Workers Party (PSOE) and its main foreign policy analyst. In 1978 he was elected senator representing the Asturian constituency.

Morán served as the minister of foreign affairs in the first cabinet of Prime Minister Felipe González. On 4 July 1985, Morán was fired and was succeeded by Francisco Fernández Ordóñez in the post in a cabinet reshuffle. Morán's anti-NATO position led to his dismissal.

From 1985 to 1987 Morán served as the Spanish representative at the United Nations. In 1987, he became the head of the Socialist Party group at the European Parliament. He continued to serve at the parliament for two further terms, and his tenure ended in 1999. During his term he chaired the committee on institutional affairs from 22 July 1994 to 15 January 1997.

=== Views and activities ===
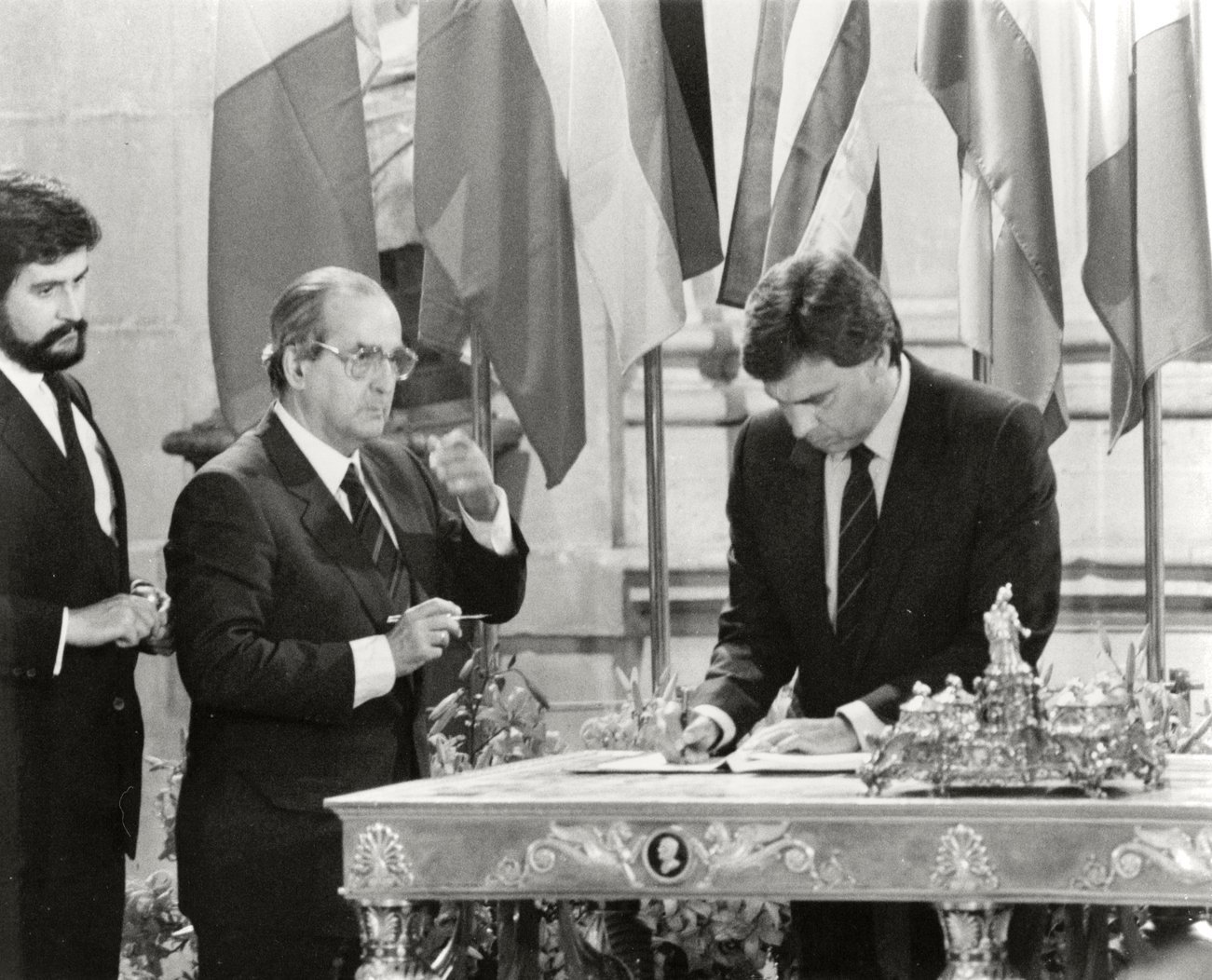
Manuel Marín and Fernando Morán watch Prime Minister Felipe González signing the Treaty of Accession of Spain to the EU in the Royal Palace on 12 June 1982

Morán had never a close relationship with the Prime Minister Felipe González. During his term as foreign minister Morán was among those who successfully lobbied for entrance of Spain to the European Union. In addition, Minister for European Community Relations Manuel Marín and Morán led the negotiation team which was tasked to realize Spain's accession to the Union.

In 1984, Morán also successfully negotiated the Brussels Agreement for Spain. On the other hand, he strongly objected to the continuation of Spain's membership of NATO. As minister, he was one of the most representative members of the line of thought within the Spanish foreign office espousing pro-Arab stances.

=== Work ===
Morán was the author of several novels, poetry and books on literary criticism. In 1980 he published a book on the foreign policy of Spain: Una Política Exterior Para España (Spanish: A Foreign Policy for Spain). In the book he advocated his opposition against NATO supporting a third-worldist foreign policy for Spain. One of his books, Luz al fondo del túnel, was published in 1999. He also published his biography in 2002 with the title of Palimpsesto: a modo de memorias.

== Death ==
Morán was married and had three children. He died on 19 February 2020 in Madrid.
