= Carlos Carnero =

Spanish politician

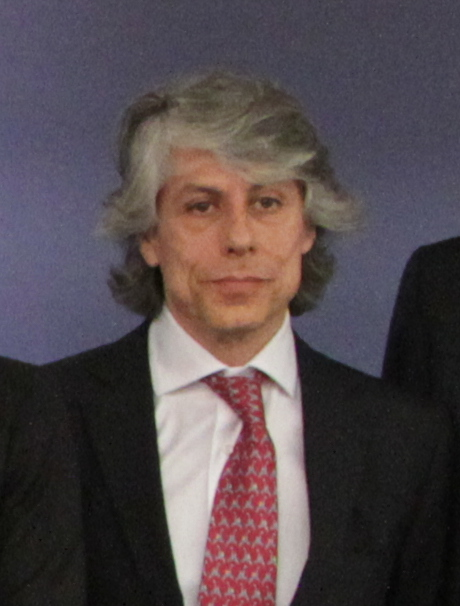
- Carnero in 2011

Member of the European Parliament
- Incumbent
- Assumed office 1994
- Constituency: Spain

Personal details
- Born: 24 November 1961 (age 64) Madrid, Spain
- Party: Spanish Socialist Workers' Party
- Other political affiliations: Party of European Socialists
- Occupation: Politician

Carlos Carnero González (born 24 November 1961, Madrid) is a Member of the European Parliament for the Spanish Socialist Workers' Party (PSOE). He has been a Member of the European Parliament (MEP) since 1994. On 7 December 2006, he was appointed a member of the presidency of the Party of European Socialists (PES).

Carnero is a member of the Parliament's Constitutional Affairs Committee and is the spokesman for the PES Group of the European Parliament's Delegation to the Euro-Mediterranean Parliamentary Assembly (EMPA). He is also a substitute member of the Parliament's Foreign Affairs Committee and Petitions committee. Carlos Carnero is a member of the delegation for relations with the Maghreb countries; the Delegation to the Euro-Mediterranean Parliamentary Assembly; and the delegation to the EU-Turkey Joint Parliamentary Committee.

He is a member of the PSOE Council on International Relations, where he directs the Working Group on Mediterranean Affairs. He was a member of the PSOE Federal Committee from 2001 to 2004.

He is also a Member of the Steering Committee of the European Movement.

Carlos Canero was the Nueva Izquierda European Policy Secretary (1998-2001) and IU External Policy Secretary (1992-1997).

He was the Chairman of the Parliament's team of observers at the parliamentary elections in Lebanon.

He is a Member of the Federalist Intergroup for the European Constitution.

He is a member of the editorial team of the Spanish political review 'Temas'.

He is also a member of the Movement for Peace, Disarmament and Liberty and Association for Democratic Solidarity with Equatorial Guinea. He is a Member of the Spanish Union CCOO (the Workers' Committees).

On 5 March 2020 Carnero took office as member of the Assembly of Madrid, covering the vacant seat left by Llanos Castellanos, appointed as new chairwoman of Patrimonio Nacional.

== Carlos Carnero and the European Constitution ==
Carnero is one of the leading proponents of the European Constitution, which has been approved by a majority of EU countries. He was an active member of the European Convention that drafted the European Constitution. He actively participated in the Spanish referendum campaign for the European Constitution of February 2005, which was approved by a 76.72% of votes cast, co-directing the campaign effort for the PSOE.

He is still campaigning for the European Constitution at the European Parliament, in his conferences and articles. He also published the book "The European Constitution: Instructions Manual"(La Constitución Europea: manual de instrucciones) in 2005, together with Ramón Suárez and María José Martínez Iglesias.

== Early and personal life ==
Carnero holds a Diploma in Tourism. He was a Member of the Scientific Council at the Elcano Royal Institute and was a Professor of European Union Studies at the Universidad CEU San Pablo.

He is married but has no children.

He speaks Spanish, English, French and Italian.

== Publications ==
- Co-author of "Europe: the State of the Union" (Europa: el estado de la Unión) (2006.)
- Co-author of "The European Constitution: Instructions Manual" (La Constitución Europea: manual de instrucciones) (2005.)
- Co-author of "Building the European Constitution. Political Chronicle of the Convention" (Construyendo la Constitución Europea. Crónica política de la Convención) (2003.)
- Co-author of "12 Visions of a progressive policy" (12 Visiones de una política de progreso) (1998.)
