= José Ignacio Salafranca Sánchez-Neyra =

Spanish politician and diplomat

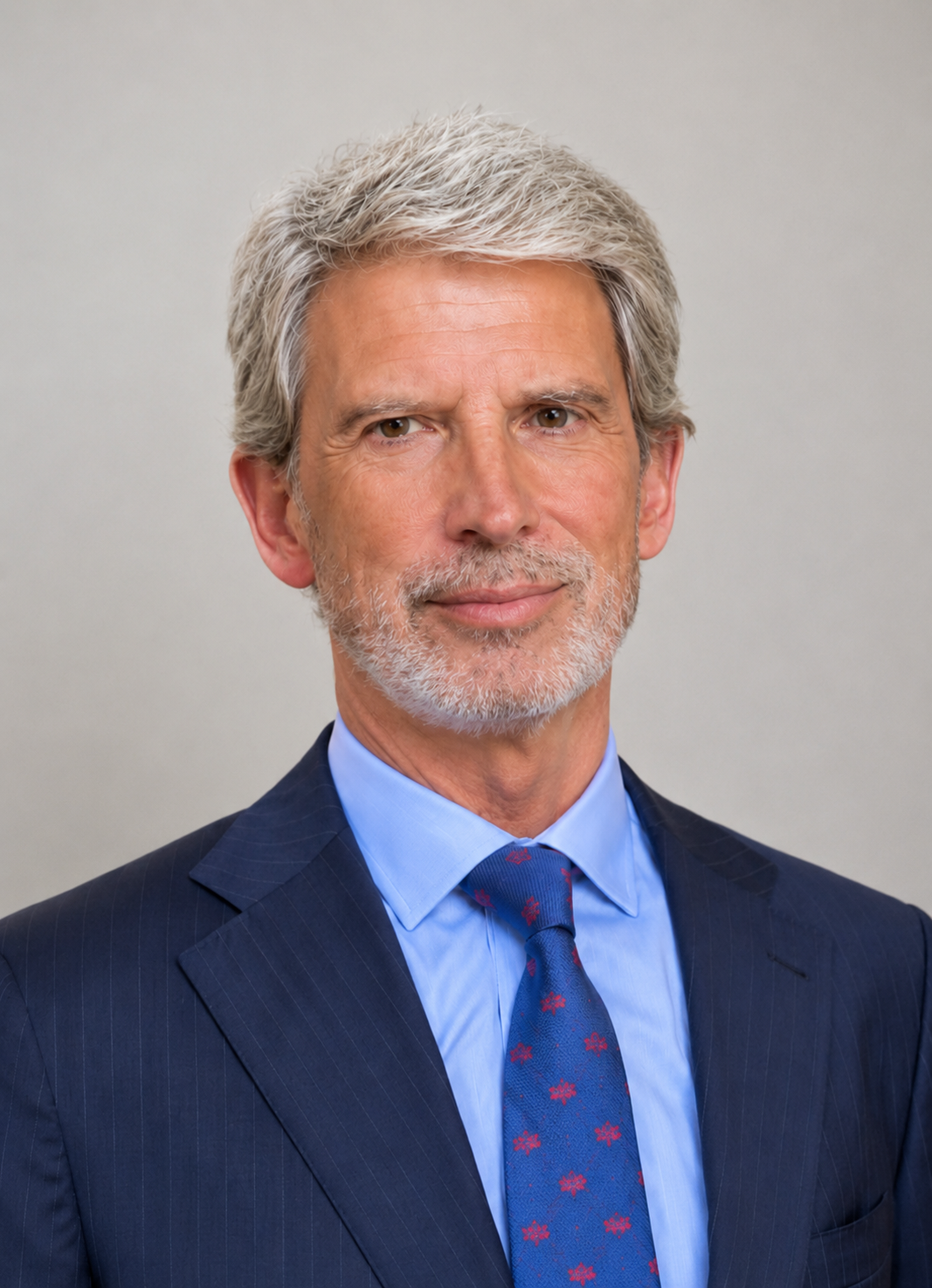

Member of the European Parliament for Spain
- In office 19 July 1994 – 1 July 2014

Member of the European Parliament for Spain
- In office 3 January 2017 – 1 July 2019

Ambassador Extraordinary and Plenipotentiary and Head of the Delegation of the European Union to the Argentine Republic
- In office 2015–2017

Personal details
- Born: José Ignacio Salafranca Sánchez-Neyra; 31 May 1955 (age 71) Madrid, Spain
- Party: People's Party
- Education: Complutense University of Madrid

José Ignacio Salafranca Sánchez-Neyra (born 31 May 1955) is a Spanish politician, diplomat, lawyer, and academic who has held senior positions within the institutions of the European Union in the field of foreign relations, principally between the European Union and Latin America.

During nearly twenty-five years as a Member of the European Parliament (MEP), he served as Vice President of the European People's Party (EPP) Group, the Parliament's largest political group, and became the first President of the Euro-Latin American Parliamentary Assembly (EuroLat). He later served as Ambassador of the European Union to the Argentine Republic, representing the European Union in Argentina from 2015 to 2017, and subsequently as a member of the European Economic and Social Committee, representing the Spanish Confederation of Business Organizations (CEOE).

Salafranca currently serves as First Vice President of the Euroamérica Foundation, one of Spain's leading institutions dedicated to strengthening political, economic, and institutional relations between Europe and Latin America. Through the Foundation, he continues to participate in high-level dialogue among European and Latin American political leaders, business executives, diplomats, and academics.

Salafranca's work has focused on European foreign policy, parliamentary diplomacy, democracy promotion, and election observation. He has led European Union election observation missions, represented the European Parliament at international summits, and served as rapporteur on association, trade, and cooperation agreements between the European Union and third countries, particularly those in Latin America.

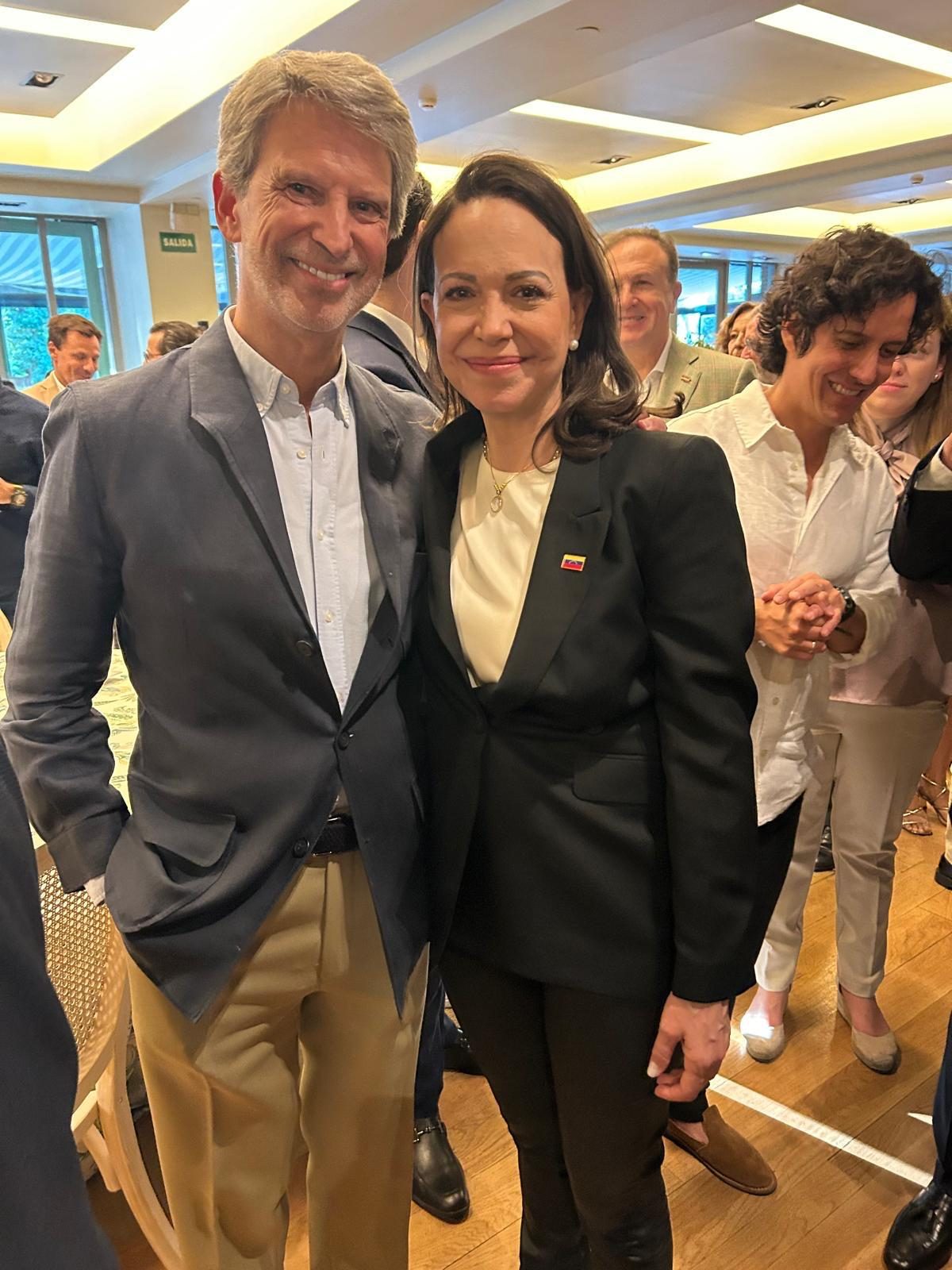
Jose Ignacio Salafranca with Nobel Prize Recipient María Corina Machado, Madrid, 2026

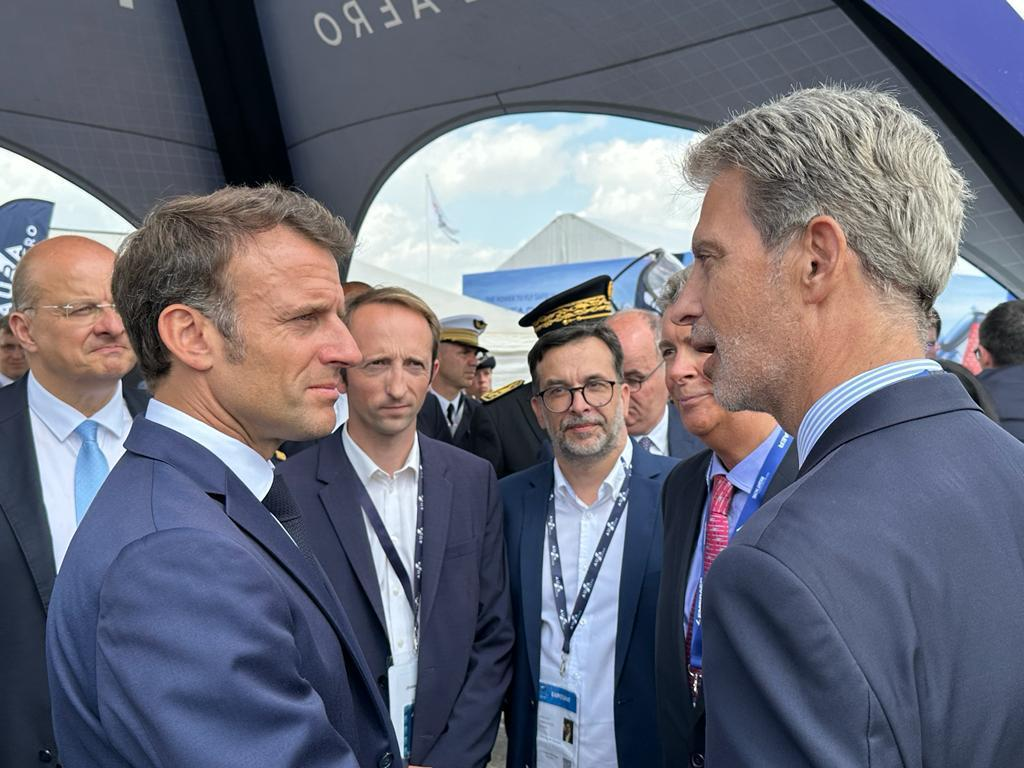
Jose Ignacao Salafranca with French President Emmanuel Macron, Paris Air Show, 2023

MEP Jose Ignacio Salafranca shaking hands with Benita Ferrero-Waldner, European Commissioner for Foreign Affairs. Prague, 2009.

== Early life and education ==
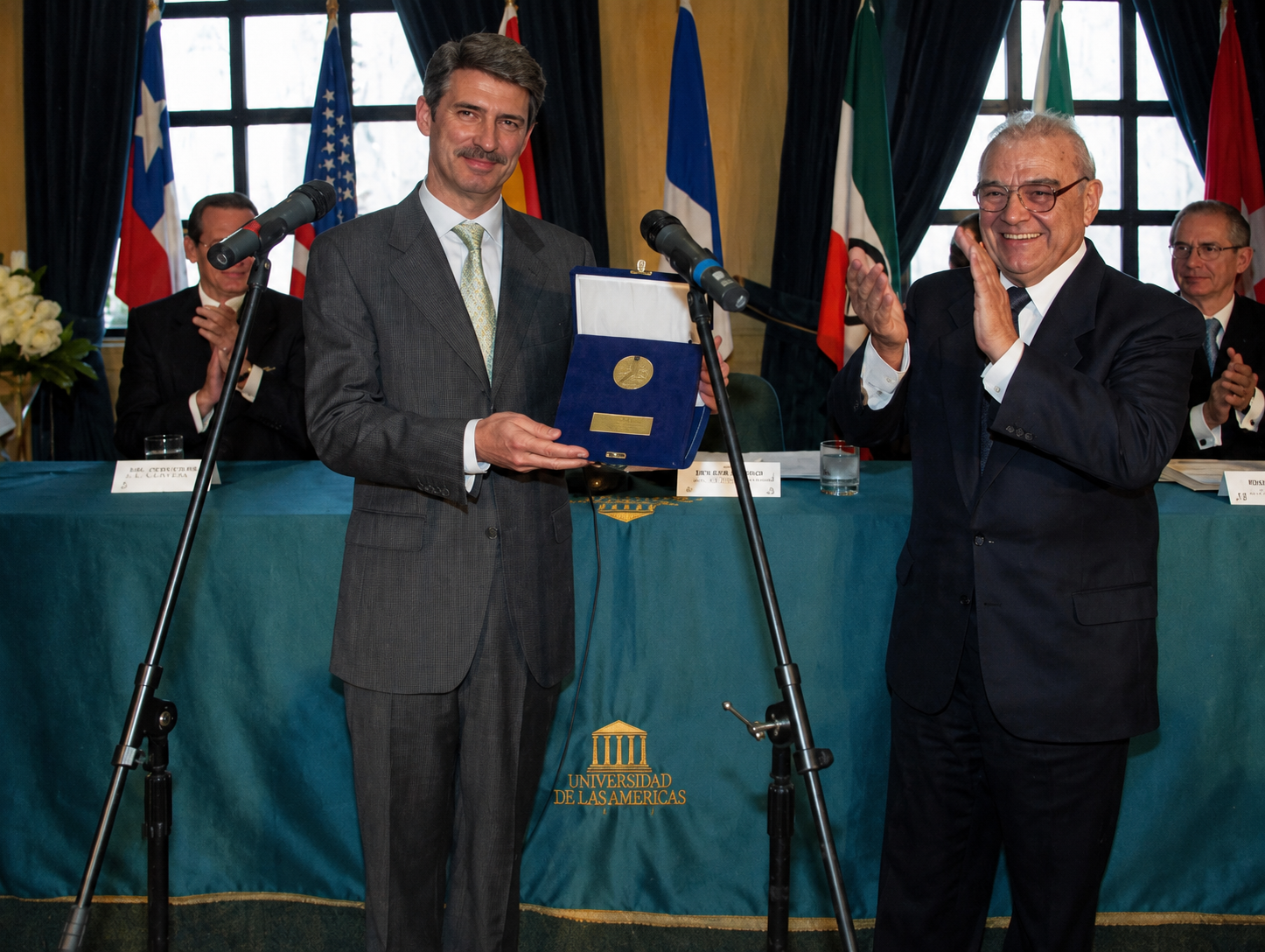
Salafranca with Marco Albertini, Santiago de Chile 2003

Salafranca studied law at the Complutense University of Madrid, where he also undertook doctoral studies. He later completed postgraduate studies in European Communities at the Spanish Diplomatic School, Human Resources Management and Public Administration at Spain's National Institute of Public Administration, Agricultural Law through the Spanish Association of Agricultural Law, and the National Defense Studies Programme at the Centre for National Defence Studies (CESEDEN), and held the rank of Infantry Reserve Officer.

He was awarded an honorary doctorate (Doctor Honoris Causa) by the Universidad de Las Américas in Chile.

== European Commission ==
MEP José Ignacio Salafranca with the President of the European Commission Jean Claude Juncker. Strasbourg. 2018

Following Spain's accession to the European Communities, Salafranca joined the European Commission in January 1986.

He served in the Cabinet of Commissioner Abel Matutes during the Delors Commissions and later became Deputy Chief of Staff to Commissioner Matutes, whose responsibilities included Credits, Investments, Financing Engineering, SMS, External Relations, Transport, and Energy. He subsequently served as Deputy Chief of Staff to Commissioner Marcelino Oreja.

== European Parliament ==
Salafranca was elected to the European Parliament in 1994 and served until 2014. He returned to Parliament from 2017 to 2019.

MEP Jose Ignaio Salafranca with then President of European Parliament Antonio Tajani, currently Vice Prime and Foreign Minister of Italy, Brussels, 2018

He served as Vice President of the European People's Party Group, a member of its Bureau, spokesperson for the Group on the Committee on Foreign Affairs, and a member of the restricted parliamentary body authorized to examine classified Council documents.

His committee assignments included Foreign Affairs, International Trade, Constitutional Affairs, Transport, Budgets, Budgetary Control, Financial Crimes, Tax Evasion and Tax Avoidance (TAX3), and the Temporary Committee investigating the CIA extraordinary rendition programme. He also served as co-chairman of the Arab Spring working group and led the ad hoc missions to Tunisia and Libya.

He served as a Member of the Delegation for relations with the USA, Member of the Board of Governors of the European Endowment for Democracy, as a Representative of the European Parliament on the Board of the EU Trust Fund for Colombia, and a Member of the Democracy Support and Election Coordination Group.

=== EU–Latin America relations ===
MEP José Ignacio Salafranca greeting President of Peru Alejandro Toledo in the presence of Hans-Gert Pöttering, then President of the EPP Group and later President of the European Parliament. Strasbourg, 2002.

He chaired parliamentary delegations responsible for relations with Mexico, Cuba, Central America, Mercosur, and South America, and was elected the first European Co-President of the Euro-Latin American Parliamentary Assembly (EuroLat),having competed for this position with then European Parliament President, Mr. Josep Borrell. EuroLat is the interparliamentary assembly established in 2006 to link the European Parliament with Latin American legislatures. EuroLat is presided over by two co-presidents, one European and one Latin American.

MEP Jose Ignacio Salafranca with Sebastián Piñera, President of Chile. Cúcuta, Colombia, 2019

As rapporteur, he led parliamentary work on association and cooperation agreements between the European Union and Mercosur, Mexico, Chile, Colombia, Peru, Ecuador, and Central America. He also represented the European Parliament at successive EU–Latin America and Caribbean Summits, Ibero-American Summits, Rio Group meetings, and San José Ministerial Conferences.

He chaired the European Parliament’s Delegation to the Euro-Latin American Parliamentary Assembly (DLAT) from 2007 to 2014, and was succeeded in the role by the former minister Ramón Jáuregui.

=== Election observation and democracy promotion ===
Salafranca was extensively involved in election observation and democracy support throughout his parliamentary career.

Mr. Salafranca, Chief Observer of the EU Election Observation Mission to Lebanon, with former United States President Jimmy Carter, giving a joint press conference. Beirut, 2009.

He served as Chief Observer of European Union Election Observation Missions in Lebanon (2005 and 2009), Mexico (2006), Peru (2006 and 2011), and Algeria (2012). Separately, he chaired European Parliament observation delegations to the 2000 general elections in Peru, the 2002 presidential elections in Colombia, and elections in Afghanistan in 2005, El Salvador in 2009 and Paraguay in 2013 and 2018 and Lebanon in 2018.

The 2005 parliamentary elections in Lebanon were widely regarded as historic, taking place after the withdrawal of Syrian military forces and following the assassination of former Prime Minister Rafik Hariri. The European Union mission led by Salafranca was among the most closely watched international observation missions of the period.

In 2006 Salafranca led a team of approximately 80 European Union electoral observers for 2006 Mexican general election. The initial official count gave candidate Calderon a lead of roughly 0.58 percentage points. Rival candidate Lopez Obrador rejected the result, alleged widespread irregularities, and demanded a full recount. Because of the extremely close result and ensuing controversy, Salafranca extended the observation mission specifically to follow the legal challenges, the Electoral Tribunal's ruling, the final results and the formal declaration of the president-elect.

During the controversy Salafranca said that he wished Mexican law had permitted a complete vote by vote recount, because it could have removed some of the uncertainty surrounding such a close election.

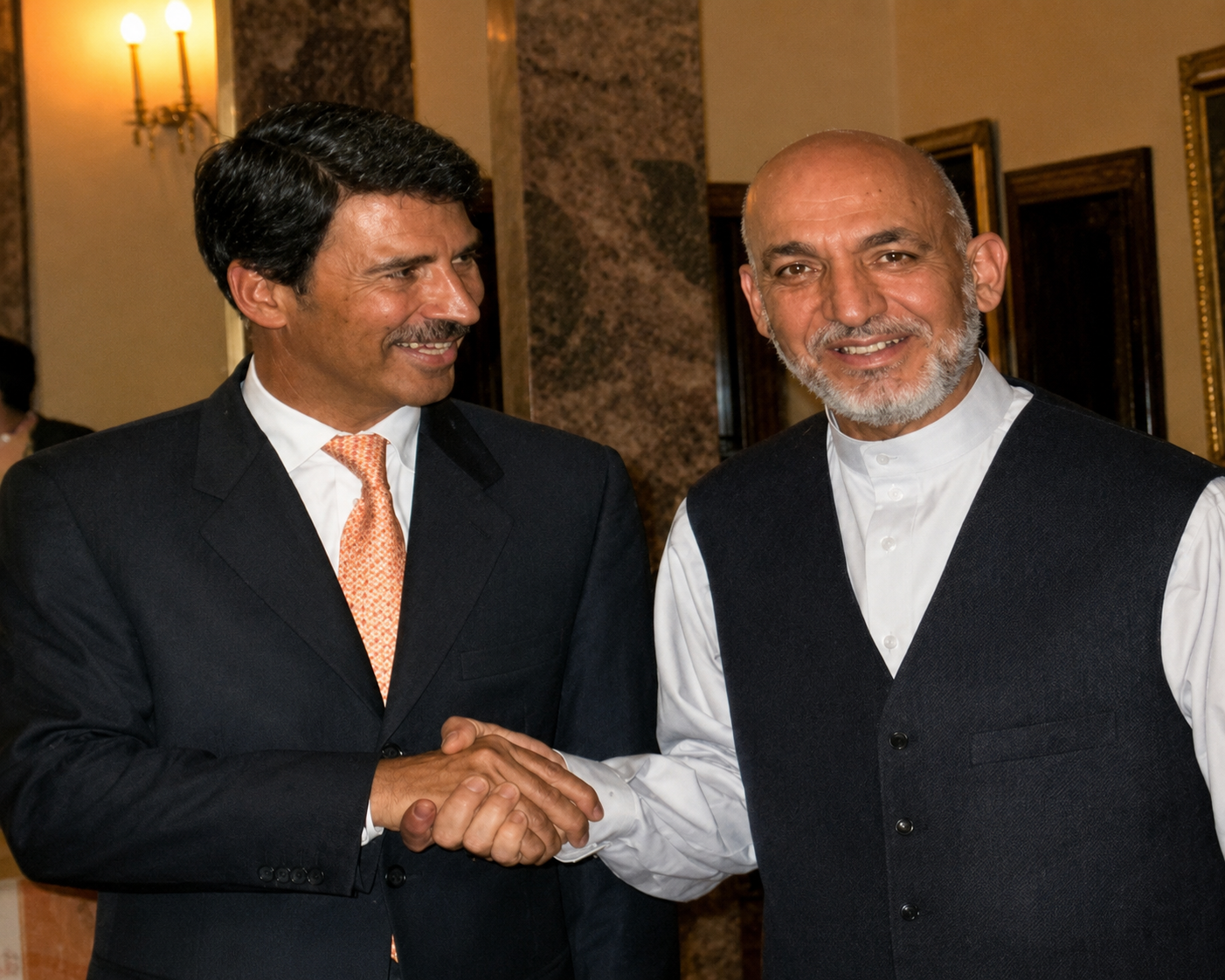
Salafranca, chair of the European Parliament delegation to the Afghan elections, with President Hamid Karzai, Kabul, 2005

He expressed his confidence in the Mexican Institutions, especially in the Federal Electoral Tribunal, to solve the post electoral conflicts as the representatives of the political forces had previously agreed in the Federal Electoral Council. It is clear that the authority to decide the winner of a Mexican Election, on the basis of the Mexican Constitution, belongs exclusively to the Federal Electoral Tribunal.

After the decision of the Tribunal, the EU Election Observation Mission accepted the decision of the Tribunal while recommending electoral reforms.

Mark Almond, another election observer, questioned the objectivity of Salafranca and of some of the mass media. The EU Foreign Affairs Commissioner, Mrs. Ferrero-Waldner, made a statement on July 6, 2006 underlining the positive role developed by the EU Observation Election Mission.

He was also active in promoting democracy and human rights through the European Parliament and proposed several recipients of the Parliament's Sakharov Prize for Freedom of Thought, including, among others, the Spanish civic movement ¡Basta Ya!, Cuban democracy activists Oswaldo Payá, the Ladies in White, Guillermo Fariñas, and members of Venezuela's democratic opposition.

== Ambassador of the European Union to Argentina ==
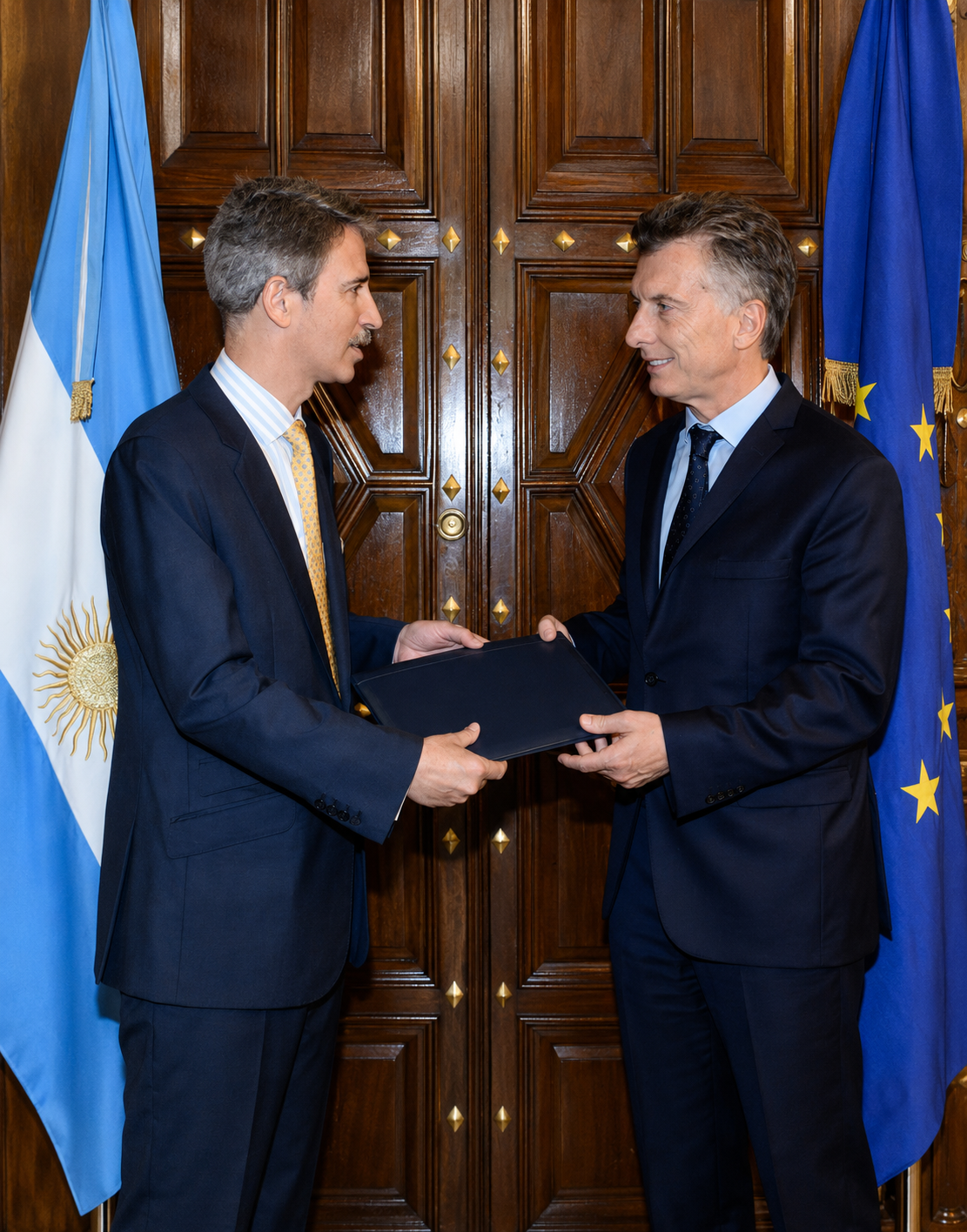
Ambassador José Ignacio Salafranca presenting his letters of credence to the Argentinian President Mauricio Macri, Buenos Aires, 2017

In 2015 Salafranca was appointed Ambassador Extraordinary and Plenipotentiary and Head of the Delegation of the European Union to the Argentine Republic. The appointment was announced on 31 August 2015 by Federica Mogherini, High Representative of the European Union for Foreign Affairs and Security Policy.

In this position he represented the European Union before the Argentine Government and oversaw political dialogue, trade relations, development cooperation, and public diplomacy during a period of renewed bilateral engagement, which coincided with the resumption of negotiations on the EU–Mercosur Association Agreement.

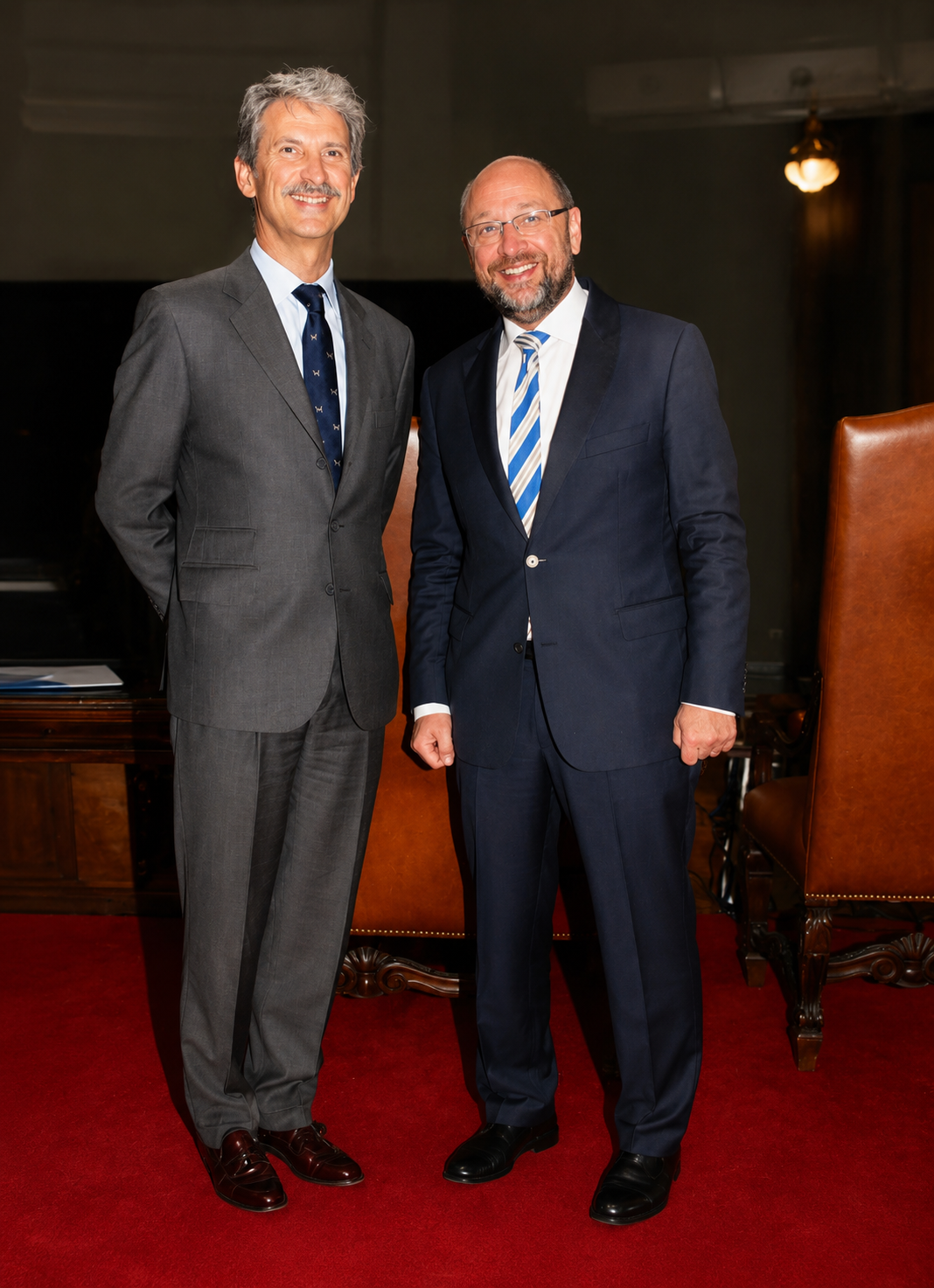
Ambassador Salafranca with Martin Schulz, president of the European Parliament, Buenos Aires, 2016

He completed his diplomatic assignment in 2017 and returned to the European Parliament, where he was appointed Standing Rapporteur for the proposed Association Agreement between the European Union and Mercosur by the Committee on International Trade.

During that term he was also Vice-Coordinator for the EPP Group on the Committee on Foreign Affairs and Standing Rapporteur for the EU–Mexico agreement and the Instrument for Pre-accession Assistance (IPA III), and Standing Rapporteur for the EU Anti-Fraud Programme on the Committee on Budgetary Control.

== European Economic and Social Committee ==
From 2020 to 2025 Salafranca represented the Spanish Confederation of Business Organizations (CEOE), where he was advisor to the Presidency, as Member of the European Economic and Social Committee.

He served on the Committee's Bureau for Economic Affairs and External Relations, the Transatlantic Relations Monitoring Committee, and the European Semester Group. He also served as Vice President of the Domestic Advisory Groups monitoring implementation of the European Union's Association Agreements with Central America, Peru, Colombia, and Ecuador, and was a member of Chile's DAG.

== Current activities ==
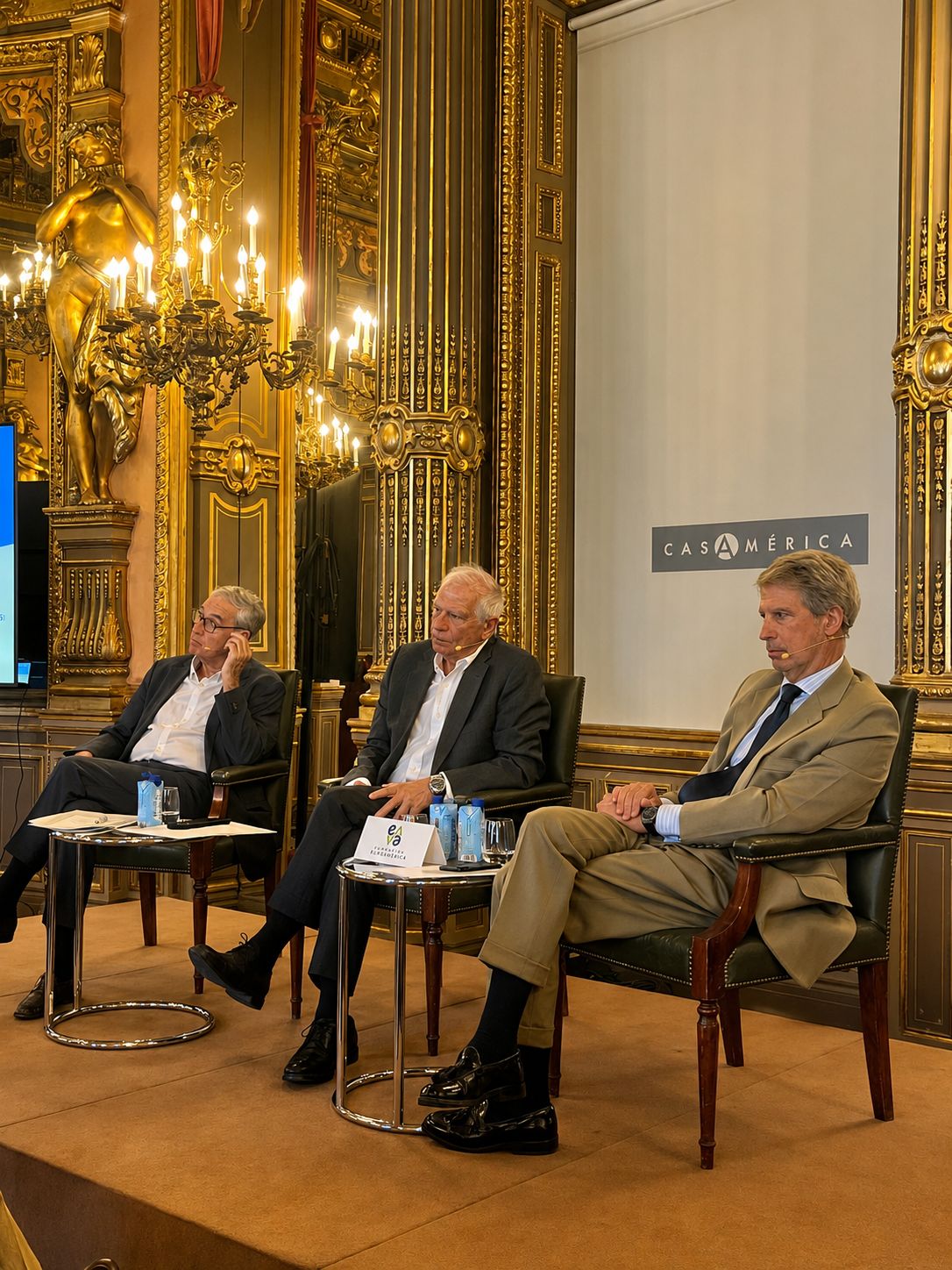
Salafranca, with Josep Borrell and Ramón Jáuregui at Casa de América, Madrid, 2026

Salafranca remains active in European and international affairs.

He serves as First Vice President of the Euroamérica Foundation, one of Spain's leading non-profit institutions dedicated to strengthening political, economic, business, and cultural relations between Europe and Latin America. The Foundation convenes heads of state and government, European Union Commissioners, ministers, diplomats, business executives, academics, and civil society leaders to promote dialogue and cooperation between the two regions.

He also serves as Vice President of the Spanish Section of the European Movement, is a member of the International Global Advisory Council of CIPPEC, serves on the Advisory Board of ABT, and was appointed in July 2026 as member of the Domestic Advisory Group (DAG), created by the European Commission to monitor implementation of the European Union–Mercosur Association Agreement.

== Academic career ==
Alongside his public service, Salafranca has maintained an extensive academic career.

He has taught at the Spanish Diplomatic School for more than two decades and has been Professor of Civil Law at Universidad San Pablo CEU. He has lectured on European integration and European affairs at universities including the Complutense University of Madrid, the Autonomous University of Madrid, the Polytechnic University of Madrid, the Universities of Paris, Lille, and Trieste, and Menéndez Pelayo International University, among many others.

He is the author of books and articles with emphasis on European integration and international relations.

== Terrorist attacks ==
Salafranca suffered two terrorist attacks during his political career.

On 27 August 2001, his vehicle was destroyed in a bombing attributed to the Basque separatist organization ETA.

On 5 January 2004, a letter bomb was delivered to his office in the European Parliament in Brussels while he was serving as Vice-Chairman of the European People's Party Group. Similar devices were sent during the same period to European Commission President Romano Prodi and EPP Group President Hans-Gert Pöttering.

== Russian sanctions ==
In 2015 Salafranca was one of the two Spanish nationals included on the Russian Federation's list of European politicians barred from entering Russia, commonly referred to as "Putin's blacklist." The sanctions were imposed amid deteriorating relations between Russia and the European Union following the annexation of Crimea.

== Proposed United Nations nomination ==
Salafranca was endorsed by the President of the European Commission, the Government of Spain, and seventeen European heads of government as a candidate for Administrator of the United Nations Development Programme (UNDP), a position carrying the rank of Under-Secretary-General of the United Nations.

== Venezuela ==
On 18 February 2019, he, together with MEPs Esteban González Pons and Gabriel Mato Adrover, claimed that they were expelled from Venezuela as they had wanted to visit Juan Guaidó.

== Honors ==
The following decorations are listed in Salafranca's official biography.

- Grand Collar of the Order of Merit of the Latin American Parliament
- Grand Cross of the Order of Merit for Distinguished Services of Peru
- Grand Cross of the Order "For Merit of the Diplomatic Service of Peru José Gregorio Paz Soldán"
- Medal of the Congress of the Republic of Peru
- Grand Cross of the Order of Merit of Chile
- Grand Cross of the Order of Antonio José de Irisarri of Guatemala
- Grand Cross of the Order of Francisco de Miranda of Venezuela
- Grand Cross of the Order of Morazán of the Central American Parliament
- Grand Cross of the Order of the Quetzal of Guatemala
- Grand Officer of the Andean Order of Merit of the Andean Parliament
- Grand Officer of the Order of Bernardo O'Higgins of Chile
- Grand Officer of the Order of Central American Merit of the Central American Parliament
- Grand Officer of the Order of San Carlos of Colombia
- Grand Officer of the Order of the Five Volcanoes of Guatemala
- Grand Officer of the Order of Merit (Ecuador)
- Grand Officer of the Order of the Battle of San Jacinto of Nicaragua
- Grand Officer of the Order of Merit of Colombia
- Commander of the Order of Merit of Colombia
- Commander of the Order of the Sun of Peru
- Commander of the Order of Merit of Ecuador
- Officer of the Order of May of Argentina
- Officer of the Order of the Aztec Eagle of Mexico
- Order of the Cedar of Lebanon
- Presidential Order of Excellence of Georgia
- National Order of Merit "Don José Falcón" of Paraguay
- Officer of the National Order "José Matías Delgado" of El Salvador

Political offices
Preceded by	Chair of the European Parliament's Delegation to the Euro-Latin American Parliamentary Assembly (DLAT); 2007–2009; 2009–2014	Succeeded by Ramón Jáuregui
