= Francisco Sanz Fernández =

Spanish politician

Francisco Sanz Fernández (Valencia, Spain, 1952) is a Spanish politician for the Spanish Socialist Workers' Party (PSOE).

Married, with two children, Sanz gained a Doctorate in Engineering. He joined the PSOE in 1976 and in 1977 stood in the first democratic elections as a candidate for the Spanish Congress of Deputies in Valencia Province but was unsuccessful at the first attempt. Between 1978 and 1979 he worked in the pre-autonomous government of the Valencian Community which supervised the region in preparation for the granting of full devolution of powers.

In 1979 he was elected to the Spanish Congress representing Valencia Province and was re-elected in 1982 and 1986. However, on the latter occasion he resigned one year later after being elected to the European Parliament in the 1987 elections. He remained an MEP until 1999. Subsequently, he has represented the PSOE in various roles in the Valencian Community and from 2004 to 2005 was Rector of the University of Valencia.
