= 1994 European Parliament election in Spain =

- 12 June 1994

All 64 Spanish seats in the European Parliament
- Opinion polls
- Registered: 31,558,999 ▲7.8%
- Turnout: 18,664,055 (59.1%) ▲4.4 pp
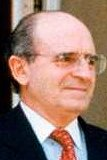

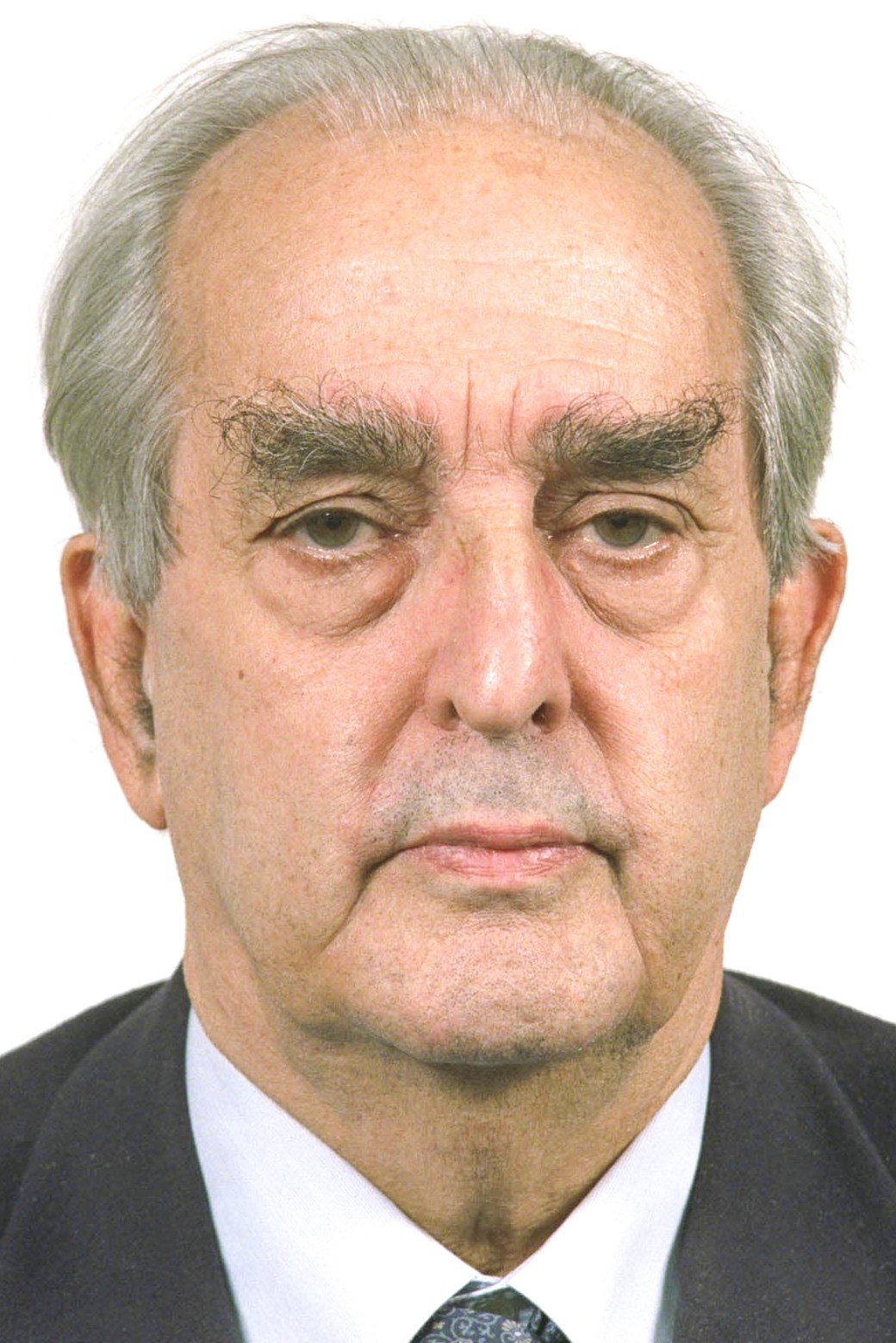

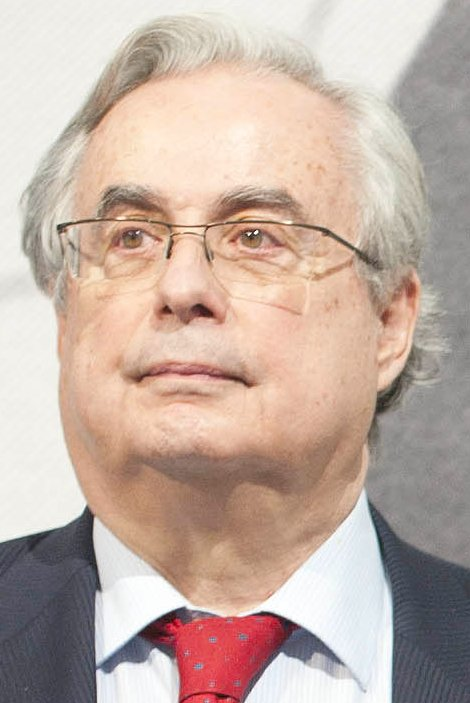

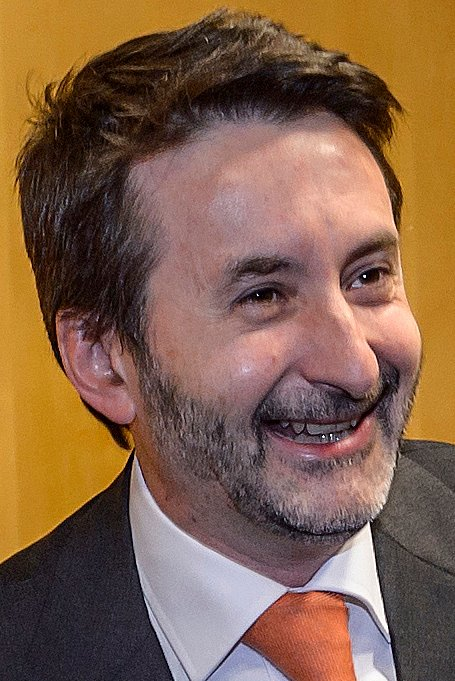

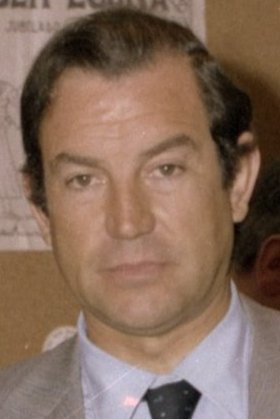
	First party	Second party	Third party
Leader	Abel Matutes	Fernando Morán	Alonso Puerta
Party	PP	PSOE	IU
Alliance	EPP	PES	EUL
Leader since	18 November 1993	10 April 1987	2 March 1994
Leader's seat	Spain	Spain	Spain
Last election	15 seats, 21.4%	27 seats, 40.2% (Note: Results for PSOE (39.6%, 27 seats) and IP in the Basque Country and Navarre (0.7%, 0 seats) in the 1989 election.)	4 seats, 6.1%
Seats won	28	22	9
Seat change	▲13	▼5	▲5
Popular vote	7,453,900	5,719,707	2,497,671
Percentage	40.1%	30.8%	13.4%
Swing	▲18.7 pp	▼9.4 pp	▲7.3 pp
	Fourth party	Fifth party	Sixth party
Leader	Carles Gasòliba	Josu Jon Imaz	Carlos Garaikoetxea
Party	CiU	CN	PEP
Alliance	ELDR; EPP	EPP; ERA	RBW
Leader since	1 January 1986	27 February 1994	29 April 1987
Leader's seat	Spain	Spain	Spain (lost)
Last election	2 seats, 4.5% (Note: Results for CiU (4.2%, 2 seats) and IP in the Balearic Islands and the Valencian Community (0.3%, 0 seats) in the 1989 election.)	1 seat, 2.6% (Note: Results for CN, not including Castile and León (1.9%, 1 seat) and FPR in the Valencian Community (0.7%, 0 seats) in the 1989 election.)	1 seat, 1.6% (Note: Results for PEP in the 1989 election, not including Galicia.)
Seats won	3	2	0
Seat change	▲1	▲1	▼1
Popular vote	865,913	518,532	239,339
Percentage	4.7%	2.8%	1.3%
Swing	▲0.2 pp	▲0.2 pp	▼0.1 pp

An election was held in Spain on 12 June 1994 as part of the concurrent EU-wide election to the 4th European Parliament. All 64 seats allocated to the Spanish constituency as per the 1993 Council Decision amending the Direct Elections Act were up for election. It was held concurrently with a regional election in Andalusia.

The election was held against the backdrop of the early 1990s recession and a string of corruption scandals affecting the ruling Spanish Socialist Workers' Party (PSOE) of Prime Minister Felipe González. The most recent involved former Civil Guard director Luis Roldán (in what came to be known as the Roldán affair), who had fled the country in early 1994 when it was discovered that he had used his office to amass a fortune through fraudulent means, resulting in the resignation of interior minister Antoni Asunción in the month leading to the election. The People's Party (PP) won in a landslide victory, the first PP win over the PSOE in a nationwide election.

== Overview ==
=== Electoral system ===
Voting for the European Parliament in Spain was based on universal suffrage, which comprised all Spanish nationals and resident non-national European citizens over 18 years of age with full political rights, provided that they had not been deprived of the right to vote by a final sentence, nor were legally incapacitated.

64 European Parliament seats were allocated to Spain as per the 1993 Council Decision amending the Direct Elections Act. All were elected in a single multi-member constituency—comprising the entire national territory—using the D'Hondt method and closed-list proportional voting, with no electoral threshold. The use of this electoral method resulted in an effective threshold depending on district magnitude and vote distribution.

The law did not provide for by-elections to fill vacant seats; instead, any vacancies arising after the proclamation of candidates and during the legislative term were filled by the next candidates on the party lists or, when required, by designated substitutes.

=== Outgoing delegation ===
The table below shows the composition of the Spanish delegation in the chamber at the time of the election call.

Delegation composition in May 1994
Groups	Parties	MEPs	
Groups	Parties	Seats	Total
Party of European Socialists	PSOE	28	28
European People's Party	PP	16	17
European People's Party	UDC	1	17
Liberal and Democratic Reformist Group	CDS	3	5
Liberal and Democratic Reformist Group	CDC	1	5
Liberal and Democratic Reformist Group	Foro	1	5
Rainbow Group	ERC	1	3
Rainbow Group	PA	1	3
Rainbow Group	CG	1	3
European Democratic Alliance	ARM	2	2
Non-Inscrits	IU	3	5
Non-Inscrits	IC	1	5
Non-Inscrits	HB	1	5

== Parties and candidates ==
The electoral law allowed for parties and federations registered in the interior ministry, alliances and groupings of electors to present lists of candidates. Parties and federations intending to form an alliance were required to inform the relevant electoral commission within 10 days of the election call. In order to be entitled to run, parties, federations, alliances and groupings of electors needed to secure the signature of at least 15,000 registered electors; this requirement could be lifted and replaced through the signature of at least 50 elected officials—deputies, senators, MEPs or members from the legislative assemblies of autonomous communities or from local city councils. Electors and elected officials were disallowed from signing for more than one list.

Below is a list of the main parties and alliances which contested the election:

Candidacy	Parties and alliances	Leading candidate	Ideology	Previous result		Ref.
Candidacy	Parties and alliances	Leading candidate	Ideology	Vote %	Seats	Ref.
PSOE	List: Spanish Socialist Workers' Party (PSOE); Socialists' Party of Catalonia (PSC)	Fernando Morán	Social democracy	40.2%	27	
PP	List: People's Party (PP); Navarrese People's Union (UPN)	Abel Matutes	Conservatism; Christian democracy	21.4%	15	
Foro–CDS	List: Forum (Foro); Democratic and Social Centre (CDS)	Eduard Punset	Centrism; Liberalism	7.1%	5	
IU	List: United Left (IU) – Communist Party of Spain (PCE) – Socialist Action Party (PASOC) – Republican Left (IR) – Collectives for the Unity of Workers (CUT); Initiative for Catalonia (IC) – Unified Socialist Party of Catalonia (PSUC)	Alonso Puerta	Socialism; Communism	6.1%	4	
CiU	List: Convergence and Union (CiU) – Democratic Convergence of Catalonia (CDC) – Democratic Union of Catalonia (UDC); Valencian People's Union (UPV); Socialist Party of Mallorca (PSM)	Carles Gasòliba	Catalan nationalism Centrism	4.5%	2	
Ruiz-Mateos	List: Ruiz-Mateos Group (Ruiz-Mateos)	José María Ruiz-Mateos	Right-wing populism	3.8%	2	
CN	List: Basque Nationalist Party (EAJ/PNV); Canarian Coalition (CC); Valencian Union (UV); Aragonese Party (PAR); Galician Coalition (CG); Majorcan Union (UM)	Josu Jon Imaz	Peripheral nationalism Regionalism	2.6%	1	
PA–PAP	List: Andalusian Party (PA); Andalusian Progress Party (PAP)	Diego de los Santos	Andalusian nationalism Social democracy	1.9%	1	
HB	List: Popular Unity (HB) – Basque Nationalist Action (EAE/ANV) – Patriotic Socialist Committees (ASK)	Karmelo Landa	Basque independence Abertzale left Revolutionary socialism	1.7%	1	
PEP	List: Basque Solidarity (EA); Catalan Action (AC); Republican Left of Catalonia (ERC); Nationalist and Ecologist Agreement (ENE); Commoners' Land–Castilian Nationalist Party (TC–PNC)	Carlos Garaikoetxea	Left-wing nationalism	1.4%	1	

== Opinion polls ==
The table below lists voting intention estimates in reverse chronological order, showing the most recent first and using the dates when the survey fieldwork was done, as opposed to the date of publication. Where the fieldwork dates are unknown, the date of publication is given instead. The highest percentage figure in each polling survey is displayed with its background shaded in the leading party's colour. If a tie ensues, this is applied to the figures with the highest percentages. The "Lead" column on the right shows the percentage-point difference between the parties with the highest percentages in a given poll. When available, seat projections are also displayed below the voting estimates in a smaller font.

Color key:

Exit poll

Polling firm/Commissioner	Fieldwork date	Sample size	Turnout	PSOE	PP	CDS	IU	CiU	CN	PA–PAP	HB	PEP	Lead
1994 EP election	12 Jun 1994	—N/a	59.1	30.8; 22	40.1; 28	1.0; 0	13.4; 9	4.7; 3	2.8; 2	0.8; 0	1.0; 0	1.3; 0	9.3
Demoscopia/Tele 5	12 Jun 1994	?	?	? 21/22	? 26/28	–	? 9/10	? 3	? 2	–	? 0	? 1	?
Vox Pública/Antena 3	12 Jun 1994	?	?	? 21	? 27	–	? 10	? 3	? 2	–	? 0	? 1	?
Eco Consulting/RTVE	12 Jun 1994	?	?	30.1; 21/23	38.1; 26/28	0.8; 0	14.0; 9/11	4.9; 3	2.8; 1/2	0.8; 0	1.1; 0/1	1.5; 0/1	8.0
ICP–Research/Diario 16	5 Jun 1994	2,000	?	30.3; 21/24	32.1; 22/25	1.3; 0/1	15.1; 10/12	4.7; 3/4	3.1; 1/2	1.0; 0/1	1.1; 0/1	2.0; 1	1.8
Gallup/Avui	5 Jun 1994	2,001	?	31.9; 22/23	36.3; 26	1.0; 0	14.6; 10	5.6; 3/4	3.1; 1/2	0.6; 0	0.9; 0	1.0; 0	4.4
Sigma Dos/El Mundo	4 Jun 1994	3,000	?	30.2; 21/22	39.8; 27/28	0.7; 0	15.0; 10	4.7; 3	? 1	–	–	? 0/1	9.6
Sigma Dos–Vox Pública/Antena 3	3–4 Jun 1994	?	?	30.6	40.2	–	13.7	–	–	–	–	–	9.6
Vox Pública/El Periódico	31 May–2 Jun 1994	1,303	61.8	30.5; 22/23	40.7; 29	1.3; 0/1	15.2; 10	4.1; 2	2.5; 1	–	–	1.1; 0/1	10.2
CIS	27 May–2 Jun 1994	4,073	72.7	32.5	37.5	1.0	14.1	5.1	2.8	–	0.9	1.6	5.0
Opina/La Vanguardia	30 May–1 Jun 1994	2,000	?	34.0; 21/24	39.0; 25/27	1.0; 0/1	14.0; 9/11	5.0; 3/4	1.5; 1	–	0.5; 0	1.0; 0/1	5.0
Demoscopia/El País	29–31 May 1994	2,500	63–68	31.0; 21/23	37.3; 26/28	1.3; 0	13.5; 9/10	5.0; 2/3	2.8; 1/2	0.9; 0	1.0; 0	1.9; 1	6.3
Gruppo/ABC	28–30 May 1994	2,000	59.1	31.1; 21/23	39.2; 27/28	0.7; 0	14.4; 10	5.0; 3	1.8; 1	? 0	–	? 0/1	8.1
CIS	21–26 May 1994	2,501	?	33.2	36.4	–	16.0	5.1	1.7	–	–	–	3.2
CIS	12–16 May 1994	2,499	?	34.3	36.0	–	13.9	3.9	1.2	–	–	–	1.7
Sigma Dos/El Mundo	14 May 1994	?	?	32.8; 23/24	37.6; 27	–	13.5; 9	4.9 ?	2.3 ?	–	–	–	4.8
Gruppo/ABC	7–10 May 1994	2,000	57.1	31.7; 22	38.5; 26/27	0.8; 0	14.0; 9/10	4.7; 3	2.2; 1	? 0/1	–	? 0/1	6.8
Opina/La Vanguardia	8–11 Apr 1994	2,000	?	36.0; 22/26	38.0; 24/27	1.0; 0/1	12.0; 6/8	5.0; 3	1.5; 1/2	–	0.5; 0	0.5; 0	2.0
Sigma Dos/El Mundo (Note: "Anguita es ahora el líder político más valorado, superando a González y Aznar". El Mundo (in Spanish). 28 March 1994. Archived from the original on 24 January 2008.)	23–24 Mar 1994	1,000	?	34.4; 23/25	37.7; 26/28	? 0	11.2; 7/8	4.5; 3	2.9; 2	1.4; 1	? 0	–	3.3
Gallup/ABC	10 Jan–28 Feb 1994	4,010	68.7	32.4; 22	39.1; 27	–	10.8; 7	5.3; 3	1.8 (Note: Data for Basque Nationalist Party.); 1	–	–	–	6.7
Gallup/ABC	19–29 Dec 1993	1,008	70.0	33.8; 23	38.6; 26	–	10.4; 7	5.1; 3	1.6; 1	–	–	–	4.8
1989 EP election	15 Jun 1989	—N/a	54.7	39.6; 27	21.4; 15	7.1; 5	6.1; 4	4.2; 2	1.9; 1	1.9; 1	1.7; 1	1.5; 1	18.2

== Results ==
=== Overall ===
← Summary of the 12 June 1994 European Parliament election results in Spain →
Parties and alliances	Popular vote			Seats	
Parties and alliances	Votes	%	±pp	Total	+/−
People's Party (PP)	7,453,900	40.12	+18.71	28	+13
Spanish Socialist Workers' Party (PSOE)^{1}	5,719,707	30.79	−9.43	22	−5
United Left (IU)	2,497,671	13.44	+7.38	9	+5
Convergence and Union (CiU)^{2}	865,913	4.66	+0.12	3	+1
Nationalist Coalition (CN)^{3}	518,532	2.79	+0.18	2	+1
For the Europe of the Peoples (PEP)^{4}	239,339	1.29	−0.14	0	−1
Forum–Democratic and Social Centre (Foro–CDS)	183,418	0.99	−6.16	0	−5
Popular Unity (HB)	180,324	0.97	−0.73	0	−1
Andalusian Coalition–Andalusian Power (PA–PAP)^{5}	140,445	0.76	−1.10	0	−1
Galician Nationalist Bloc (BNG)	139,221	0.75	+0.46	0	±0
Green Group (GV)	109,567	0.59	New	0	±0
Ruiz-Mateos Group (Ruiz-Mateos)	82,410	0.44	−3.40	0	−2
The Greens–Ecologist Confederation of Catalonia (EV–CEC)^{6}	42,237	0.23	−0.07	0	±0
Communist Party of the Peoples of Spain (PCPE)	29,692	0.16	−0.34	0	±0
Hunting, Fishing, Nature, Tradition (CPNT)	29,025	0.16	New	0	±0
Revolutionary Workers' Party (POR)	16,144	0.09	New	0	±0
Asturianist Party (PAS)^{7}	14,846	0.08	+0.05	0	±0
United Extremadura (EU)^{8}	13,580	0.07	±0.00	0	±0
Spanish Phalanx of the CNSO (FE–JONS)	11,733	0.06	−0.09	0	±0
Regionalist Unity of Castile and León (URCL)	10,019	0.05	New	0	±0
Natural Law Party (PLN)	7,845	0.04	New	0	±0
Humanist Party (PH)	7,499	0.04	−0.08	0	±0
Coalition for a New Socialist Party (CNPS)^{9}	7,349	0.04	−0.07	0	±0
Regionalist Party of the Leonese Country (PREPAL)	6,197	0.03	New	0	±0
Independent Spanish Phalanx (FEI)	5,602	0.03	New	0	±0
Carlist Traditionalist Communion (CTC)	5,226	0.03	New	0	±0
Justice and Welfare Party (JyB)	4,992	0.03	New	0	±0
Extremaduran Regionalist Party (PREx)	4,836	0.03	New	0	±0
National Democratic Alternative (ADN)	4,689	0.03	New	0	±0
Carlist Party (PC)	4,640	0.02	−0.03	0	±0
Galician Alternative (AG)	4,431	0.02	New	0	±0
GPOR–PST (LVS) Coalition (GPOR–PST)^{10}	3,765	0.02	−0.22	0	±0
Lanzarote Independents Party (PIL)	0	0.00	New	0	±0
The Greens of the Region of Murcia (LVRM)	0	0.00	New	0	±0
Canarian Nationalist Party (PNC)	0	0.00	New	0	±0
Left of the Peoples (IP)^{11}	n/a	n/a	−0.81	0	−1
Blank ballots	213,621	1.15	−0.12		
Total	18,578,415			64	+4
Valid votes	18,578,415	99.54	+0.56		
Invalid votes	85,640	0.46	−0.56		
Votes cast / turnout	18,664,055	59.14	+4.43		
Abstentions	12,894,944	40.86	−4.43		
Registered voters	31,558,999				
Sources
Footnotes: ^{1} Spanish Socialist Workers' Party results are compared to the combined totals of Spanish Socialist Workers' Party and Left of the Peoples in the Basque Country and Navarre in the 1989 election.; ^{2} Convergence and Union results are compared to the combined totals of Convergence and Union and Left of the Peoples in the Balearic Islands and the Valencian Community in the 1989 election.; ^{3} Nationalist Coalition (1994) results are compared to the combined totals of Nationalist Coalition (1989)—not including results in Castile and León—and Federation of Regional Parties in the Valencian Community in the 1989 election.; ^{4} For the Europe of the Peoples (1994) results are compared to For the Europe of the Peoples (1989) totals in the 1989 election, not including results in Galicia.; ^{5} Andalusian Coalition–Andalusian Power results are compared to Andalusian Party totals in the 1989 election.; ^{6} The Greens–Ecologist Confederation of Catalonia results are compared to Green Alternative–Ecologist Movement of Catalonia totals in the 1989 election.; ^{7} Asturianist Party results are compared to Left of the Peoples totals in Asturias in the 1989 election.; ^{8} United Extremadura results are compared to Federation of Regional Parties totals in Extremadura in the 1989 election.; ^{9} Coalition for a New Socialist Party results are compared to Alliance for the Republic totals in the 1989 election.; ^{10} GPOR–PST (LVS) Coalition results are compared to Workers' Socialist Party–Revolutionary Workers' Party totals in the 1989 election.; ^{11} Left of the Peoples does not include results in Asturias, Basque Country, Balearic Islands, Navarre and Valencian Community.

Popular vote
PP	40.12%
PSOE	30.79%
IU	13.44%
CiU	4.66%
CN	2.79%
PEP	1.29%
Others	5.76%
Blank ballots	1.15%

Seats
PP	43.75%
PSOE	34.38%
IU	14.06%
CiU	4.69%
CN	3.13%

=== Maps ===
Vote winner strength by province.

Vote winner strength by autonomous community.

=== Distribution by European group ===
Summary of political group distribution in the 4th European Parliament (1994–1999)
Groups	Parties	Seats	Total	%
European People's Party (EPP)	People's Party (PP); Navarrese People's Union (UPN); Democratic Union of Catalonia (UDC); Basque Nationalist Party (EAJ/PNV)	27; 1; 1; 1	30	46.88
Party of European Socialists (PES)	Spanish Socialist Workers' Party (PSOE)	22	22	34.38
European United Left (EUL)	United Left (IU)	9	9	14.06
European Liberal Democrat and Reform Party (ELDR)	Democratic Convergence of Catalonia (CDC)	2	2	3.13
European Radical Alliance (ERA)	Canarian Coalition (CC)	1	1	1.56
Total		64	64	100.00

=== Elected legislators ===
The following table lists the elected legislators:

Elected legislators
#	Name	List
1	Abel Matutes Juan	PP
2	Fernando Morán López	PSOE
3	Celia Villalobos Talero	PP
4	Francisca Sauquillo Pérez del Arco	PSOE
5	Alonso José Puerta Gutiérrez	IU
6	Mercedes de la Merced Monge	PP
7	Enrique Barón Crespo	PSOE
8	José María Gil-Robles Gil-Delgado	PP
9	Miguel Arias Cañete	PP
10	Ludivina García Arias	PSOE
11	Antoni Gutiérrez Díaz	IU
12	María Teresa Estevan Bolea	PP
13	Josep Verde i Aldea	PSOE
14	José Manuel García-Margallo Marfil	PP
15	Ana Clara María Miranda de Lage	PSOE
16	María del Carmen Fraga Estévez	PP
17	Carles-Alfred Gasoliba i Bohm	CiU
18	Laura González Álvarez	IU
19	Luis Campoy Zueco	PP
20	Pedro Aparicio Sánchez	PSOE
21	Ana Isabel Palacio Vallelersundi	PP
22	José María Mendiluce Pereiro	PSOE
23	Carlos Robles Piquer	PP
24	Manuel Medina Ortega	PSOE
25	María Sornosa Martínez	IU
26	Juan Manuel Fabra Vallés	PP
27	Gerardo Fernández Albor	PP
28	María Izquierdo Rojo	PSOE
29	Fernando Fernández Martín	PP
30	Josep Enrique Pons Grau	PSOE
31	Josu Jon Imaz San Miguel	CN
32	María Jesús Aramburu del Río	IU
33	Jaime Valdivielso de Cue	PP
34	Joan Colom i Naval	PSOE
35	Encarnación Redondo Jiménez	PP
36	Juan Luis Colino Salamanca	PSOE
37	Iñigo Méndez de Vigo Montojo	PP
38	Concepcio Ferrer i Casals	CiU
39	Salvador Jove Peres	IU
40	Javier Areitio Toledo	PP
41	Carmen Díez de Rivera Icaza	PSOE
42	Joaquín Sisó Cruellas	PP
43	Juan de Dios Izquierdo Collado	PSOE
44	Laura Elena Esteban Martín	PP
45	Jesús Cabezón Alonso	PSOE
46	Carlos Carnero González	IU
47	Daniel Varela Suances-Carpegna	PP
48	José Gerardo Galeote Quecedo	PP
49	Bárbara Duhrkop Duhrkop	PSOE
50	José Ignacio Salafranca Sánchez-Neyra	PP
51	Antonio González Triviño	PSOE
52	Ángela del Carmen Sierra González	IU
53	José Antonio Escudero López	PP
54	Francisco Javier Sanz Fernández	PSOE
55	Francisca Bennasar Tous	PP
56	Joan María Vallvé i Ribera	CiU
57	José Luis Valverde López	PP
58	Manuela de Frutos Gama	PSOE
59	Pedro Marset Campos	IU
60	Salvador Garriga Polledo	PP
61	Fernando Pérez Royo	PSOE
62	Julio Añoveros Trias de Bes	PP
63	Ana Terrón i Cusi	PSOE
64	Isidoro Sánchez García	CN

== Bibliography ==
- Ley Orgánica 5/1985, de 19 de junio, del Régimen Electoral General (Organic Law 5/1985). Official State Gazette (in Spanish). 19 June 1985 [version as of 31 March 1994]. BOE-A-1985-11672.
- Act concerning the election of the representatives of the Assembly by direct universal suffrage. Official Journal of the European Communities. 20 September 1976. 41976X1008(01).
- Decision amending the Act concerning the election of the representatives of the European Parliament by direct universal suffrage, annexed to Council Decision 76/787/ECSC, EEC, Euratom of 20 September 1976. Official Journal of the European Communities. 9 February 1983. 31993D0081.
