= Manuel Medina (politician) =

Spanish politician

Manuel Medina Ortega (born 1935 in Arrecife de Lanzarote (Las Palmas)) is a Spanish politician and Member of the European Parliament for the Spanish Socialist Workers' Party, part of the Party of European Socialists. Medina also served in the Spanish Congress of Deputies representing Las Palmas from 1982 to 1987 when he resigned upon election to the European Parliament.
