= 2014 European Parliament election in Spain =

- 25 May 2014

All 54 Spanish seats in the European Parliament
- Opinion polls
- Registered: 36,514,084 ▲2.9%
- Turnout: 15,998,141 (43.8%) ▼1.1 pp
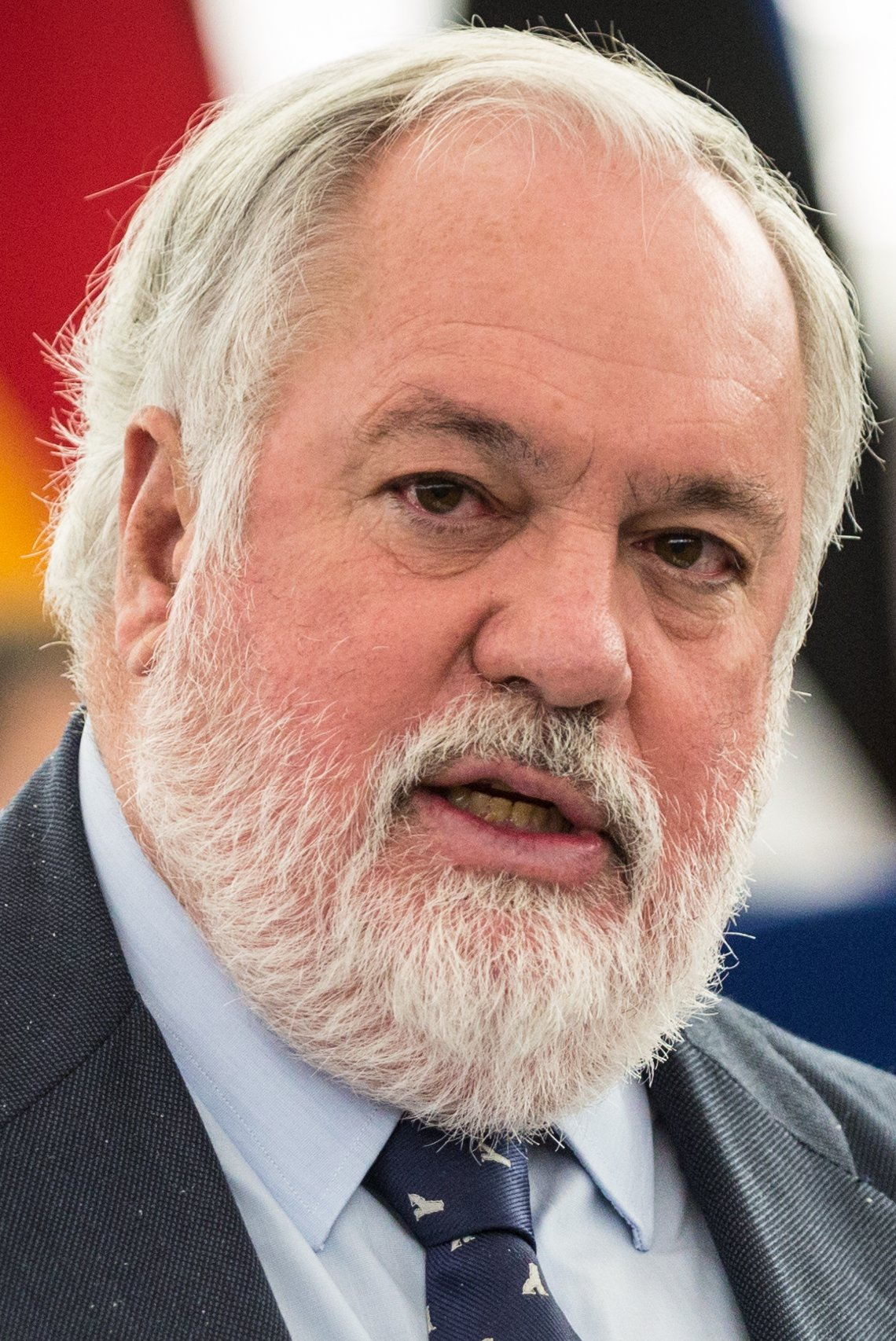

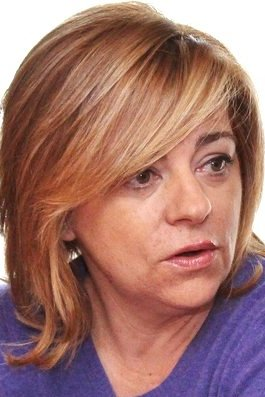

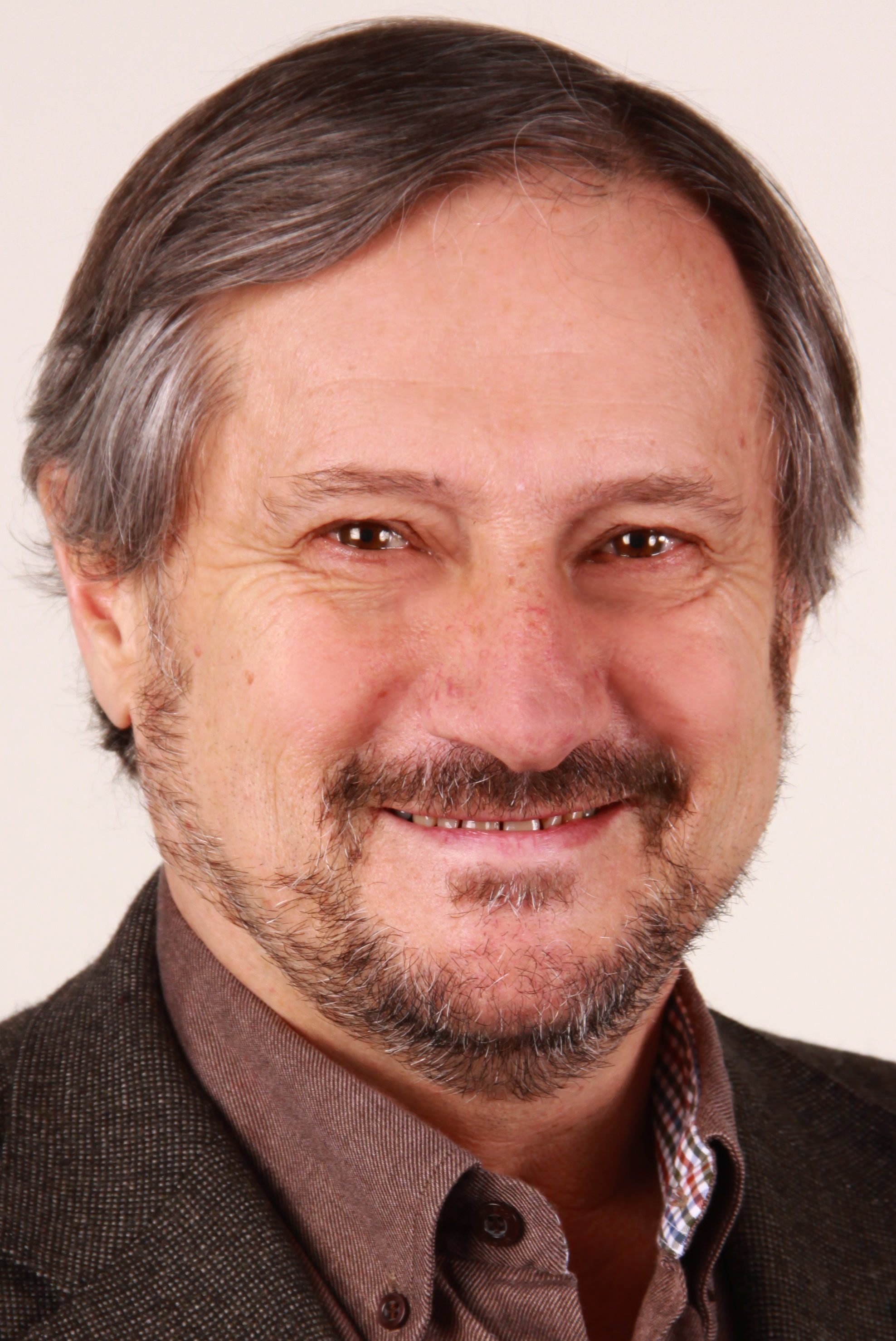

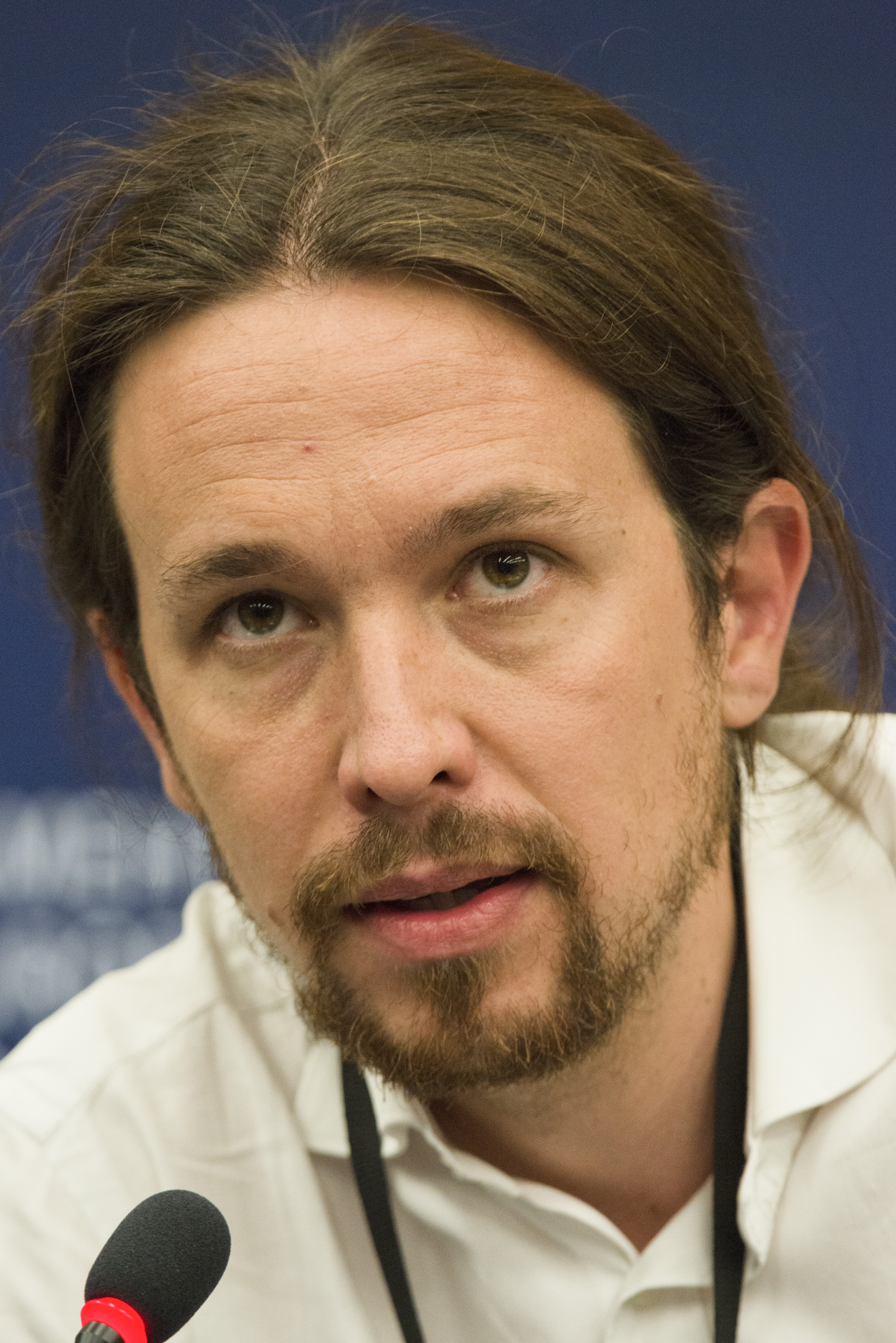

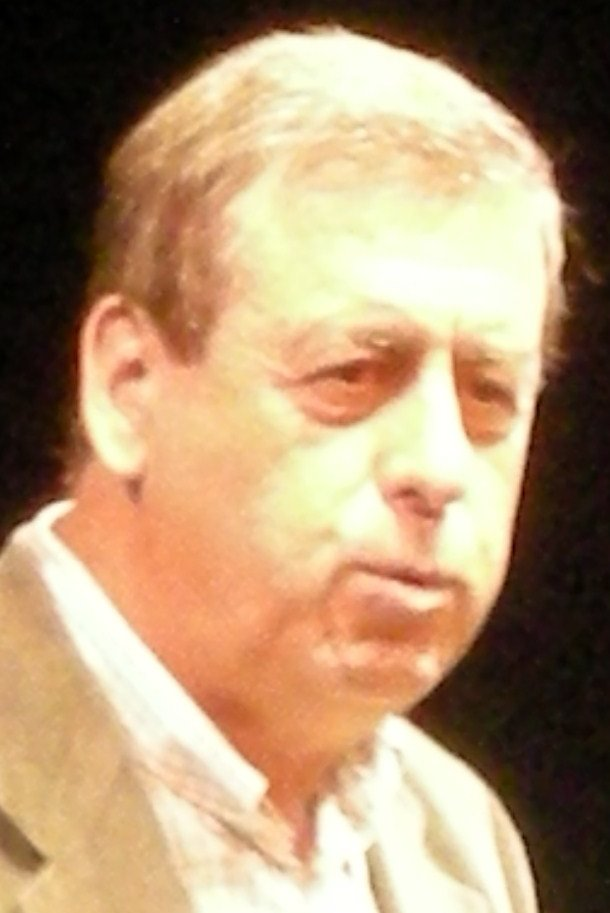

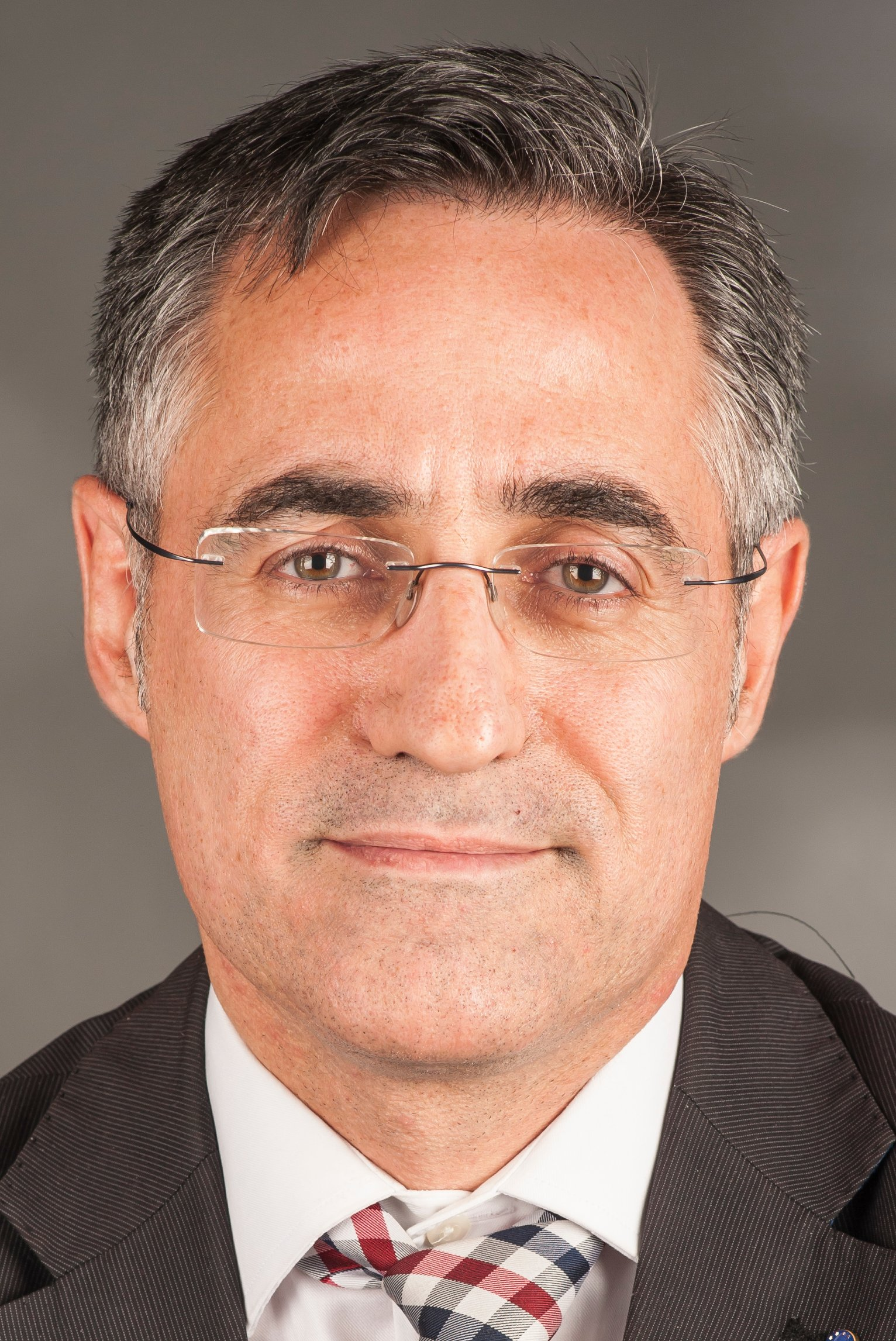
| | First party | Second party | Third party |
|---|---|---|---|
| Leader | Miguel Arias Cañete | Elena Valenciano | Willy Meyer |
| Party | PP | PSOE | IP |
| Alliance | EPP | S&D | GUE/NGL; Greens/EFA |
| Leader since | 9 April 2014 | 10 February 2014 | 8 May 2004 |
| Leader's seat | Spain | Spain | Spain |
| Last election | 24 seats, 42.1% | 23 seats, 38.8% | 2 seats, 3.7% |
| Seats won | 16 | 14 | 6 |
| Seat change | ▼8 | ▼9 | ▲4 |
| Popular vote | 4,098,339 | 3,614,232 | 1,575,308 |
| Percentage | 26.1% | 23.0% | 10.0% |
| Swing | ▼16.0 pp | ▼15.8 pp | ▲6.3 pp |
| | Fourth party | Fifth party | Sixth party |
| Leader | Pablo Iglesias | Francisco Sosa Wagner | Ramon Tremosa |
| Party | Podemos | UPyD | CEU |
| Alliance | GUE/NGL | ALDE | ALDE; EPP |
| Leader since | 3 April 2014 | 3 September 2008 | 24 January 2009 |
| Leader's seat | Spain | Spain | Spain |
| Last election | Did not contest | 1 seat, 2.9% | 3 seats, 4.8% (Note: Results for CEU in the 2009 election, not including Andalusia and the Valencian Community.) |
| Seats won | 5 | 4 | 3 |
| Seat change | ▲5 | ▲3 | 0 |
| Popular vote | 1,253,837 | 1,022,232 | 851,971 |
| Percentage | 8.0% | 6.5% | 5.4% |
| Swing | New party | ▲3.6 pp | ▲0.6 pp |

An election was held in Spain on 25 May 2014 as part of the concurrent EU-wide election to the 8th European Parliament. All 54 seats allocated to the Spanish constituency as per the Treaty of Lisbon were up for election.

The People's Party (PP) emerged as the largest party overall, albeit with its worst nationwide election result in 25 years with a mere 26.1% of the share and 16 seats, losing 2.6 million votes and 8 seats from its 2009 result. The Spanish Socialist Workers' Party (PSOE) lost 9 seats and 2.5 million votes, obtaining just 23% of the total party vote and 14 seats. This would represent the party's worst election result in recent history until the 2015 general election, in which it scored a new low. Up to 8 additional political forces obtained representation. Pablo Iglesias' newly formed Podemos party (Spanish for "We can") turned into the election night surprise by winning 5 seats and 1,253,837 votes (8.0% of the share), an unprecedented result for a party only 4 months old and contesting an election for the first time. Podemos's surge and the extent of PP and PSOE collapse were not foreseen by opinion polls during the campaign, which had predicted higher support for the two dominant parties and a weaker performance of Podemos.

United Left's Plural Left coalition and Union, Progress and Democracy (UPyD) obtained some of their best historical results, with 10.0% and 6.5% of the vote and 6 and 4 seats, respectively. However, this was far from the major election breakthrough that polls had predicted throughout 2013 and in early 2014. From this point onwards both parties would lose support in opinion polls and in successive regional and local elections. The Citizens (C's) party of Albert Rivera, then marginalised as a Catalonia-only party and after several failed attempts to jump into national politics, managed to obtain 3.2% of the share and 2 seats. Just as Podemos, it would grow in support in the run up to the next general election and become a major political actor by 2015.

== Overview ==
=== Electoral system ===
Voting for the European Parliament in Spain was based on universal suffrage, which comprised all Spanish nationals and resident non-national European citizens over 18 years of age with full political rights, provided that they had not been deprived of the right to vote by a final sentence, nor were legally incapacitated. Amendments in 2011 required non-resident citizens to apply for voting, a system known as "begged" voting (Spanish: Voto rogado).

54 European Parliament seats were allocated to Spain as per the Treaty of Lisbon. All were elected in a single multi-member constituency—comprising the entire national territory—using the D'Hondt method and closed-list proportional voting, with no electoral threshold. The use of this electoral method resulted in an effective threshold depending on district magnitude and vote distribution.

The law did not provide for by-elections to fill vacant seats; instead, any vacancies arising after the proclamation of candidates and during the legislative term were filled by the next candidates on the party lists or, when required, by designated substitutes.

=== Outgoing delegation ===
The table below shows the composition of the Spanish delegation in the chamber at the time of the election call.

Delegation composition in April 2014
| Groups | Parties | MEPs | |
| Groups | Parties | Seats | Total |
|---|---|---|---|
| European People's Party | PP | 24 | 25 |
| European People's Party | UDC | 1 | 25 |
| Progressive Alliance of Socialists and Democrats | PSOE | 23 | 23 |
| Alliance of Liberals and Democrats for Europe | CDC | 1 | 2 |
| Alliance of Liberals and Democrats for Europe | EAJ/PNV | 1 | 2 |
| Greens–European Free Alliance | ICV | 1 | 2 |
| Greens–European Free Alliance | Aralar | 1 | 2 |
| European United Left–Nordic Green Left | IU | 1 | 1 |
| Non-Inscrits | UPyD | 1 | 1 |

== Parties and candidates ==
The electoral law allowed for parties and federations registered in the interior ministry, alliances and groupings of electors to present lists of candidates. Parties and federations intending to form an alliance were required to inform the relevant electoral commission within 10 days of the election call. In order to be entitled to run, parties, federations, alliances and groupings of electors needed to secure the signature of at least 15,000 registered electors; this requirement could be lifted and replaced through the signature of at least 50 elected officials—deputies, senators, MEPs or members from the legislative assemblies of autonomous communities or from local city councils. Electors and elected officials were disallowed from signing for more than one list. Additionally, a balanced composition of men and women was required in the electoral lists, so that candidates of either sex made up at least 40 percent of the total composition.

Below is a list of the main parties and alliances which contested the election:

| Candidacy | Parties and alliances | Leading candidate | Ideology | Previous result | | Ref. |
| Candidacy | Parties and alliances | Leading candidate | Ideology | Vote % | Seats | Ref. |
|---|---|---|---|---|---|---|
| PP | List: People's Party (PP) | Miguel Arias Cañete | Conservatism; Christian democracy | 42.1% | 24 | |
| PSOE | List: Spanish Socialist Workers' Party (PSOE); Socialists' Party of Catalonia (PSC) | Elena Valenciano | Social democracy | 38.8% | 23 | |
| CEU | List: Convergence and Union (CiU); Basque Nationalist Party (EAJ/PNV); Canarian Coalition–Canarian Nationalist Party (CCa–PNC); Commitment to Galicia (CxG); Independence Rally (RI.cat) | Ramon Tremosa | Peripheral nationalism | 4.8% | 3 | |
| IP | List: United Left (IU); Initiative for Catalonia Greens–United and Alternative Left (ICV–EUiA); Galician Left Alternative (AGE); Left (I–E); The Greens (LV); Building the Left–Socialist Alternative (CLI–AS); Left Initiative–Awake (EKI–Iratzarri) | Willy Meyer | Socialism; Communism | 3.7% | 2 | |
| UPyD | List: Union, Progress and Democracy (UPyD) | Francisco Sosa Wagner | Social liberalism Radical centrism | 2.9% | 1 | |
| LPD | List: Basque Country Gather (EH Bildu); Galician Nationalist Bloc (BNG); Andecha Astur (AA); Puyalón de Cuchas (Puyalón); Unity of the People (UP); Canarian Nationalist Alternative (ANC) | Josu Juaristi | Left-wing nationalism Socialism | 2.1% (Note: Results for II–SP (1.1%, 0 seats), EdP–V in the Basque Country, Galicia and Navarre (1.0%, 0 seats) and AA (0.0%, 0 seats) in the 2009 election.) | 0 | |
| EPDD | List: Republican Left of Catalonia (ERC); New Catalan Left (NEC); Catalonia Yes (CatSí) | Josep Maria Terricabras | Catalan independence Social democracy | 1.4% (Note: Results for EdP–V in the 2009 election, not including the Basque Country, Galicia and Navarre.) | 1 | |
| PE | List: Commitment Coalition (Compromís); Equo (Equo); Aragonese Union (CHA); Participatory Democracy (Participa); Castilian Party (PCAS); For a Fairer World (PUM+J); Independent Socialists of Extremadura (SIEx); Caballas Coalition (Caballas) | Jordi Sebastià | Green politics Ecologism; Eco-socialism | 0.3% (Note: Results for PUM+J (0.2%, 0 seats), CEU in the Valencian Community (0.1%, 0 seats) and EdP–V in Aragon (0.1%, 0 seats) in the 2009 election.) | 0 | |
| C's | List: Citizens–Party of the Citizenry (C's) | Javier Nart | Social liberalism | 0.1% (Note: Results for Libertas in the 2009 election.) | 0 | |
| Vox | List: Vox (Vox) | Alejo Vidal-Quadras | Social conservatism Neoconservatism | Did not contest | | |
| Podemos | List: We Can (Podemos) | Pablo Iglesias | Left-wing populism Democratic socialism | Did not contest | | |

== Campaign ==
=== Party slogans ===
| Party or alliance | Original slogan | English translation | Ref. |
|---|---|---|---|
| PP | « Lo que está en juego es el futuro » | "What is at stake is the future" | |
| PSOE | « Tú mueves Europa » | "You move Europe" | |
| CEU: CiU–RI.cat; EAJ/PNV; CCa–PNC; CxG | CiU–RI.cat: « Guanyem-nos Europa » EAJ/PNV: « Euskadi gehiago, Europa berrian » / « Más Euskadi en otra Europa » CCa–PNC: « Exigente por Canarias » CxG: « A Europa que queremos » | CiU–RI.cat: "Let us win Europe for us" EAJ/PNV: "More Basque Country in another Europe"; CCa–PNC: "Being demanding for the Canaries"; CxG: "The Europe we want" | |
| IP | « El poder de la gente » | "The power of people" | |
| UPyD | « La unión hace la fuerza » | "In the union lies the strength" | |
| LPD: EH Bildu; BNG | EH Bildu: « Herriek erabaki » / « Los pueblos deciden » BNG: « Rebélate polos teus dereitos » | EH Bildu: "The peoples decide" BNG: "Rebel for your rights!" | |
| EPDD | « Comencem el nou país. Ara a Europa » | "Let us begin the new country. Now in Europe" | |
| PE | « La Europa de las personas » « Por fin, la Primavera » | "The Europe of people" "At last, the Spring" | |
| C's | « La fuerza de la unión » | "Strength lies in the union" | |
| Vox | « La solución es cambiar » | "The solution is to change" | |
| Podemos | « ¿Cuándo fue la última vez que votaste con ilusión? » | "When was the last time you voted with hope?" | |

=== Events and issues ===
The electoral campaign started at 12:00 am on 9 May. However, a traffic accident in Badajoz the previous night resulting in the deaths of five people—one adult and four children—and 12 injured forced the suspension of the start of the campaign in Extremadura.

On Monday 12 May, Isabel Carrasco, president of the provincial government of Leon and member of the PP, was shot dead in the street. Policial investigation concluded that the crime's motive was score-settling, since the two women arrested for committing the crime, wife and daughter of the police chief inspector in the nearby town of Astorga, were PP members; one of them having been previously fired from the provincial deputation presided by Carrasco. This event forced another suspension of the campaign for 24 hours by most major political parties, except for some minoritary parties—such as EH Bildu and the Galician Nationalist Bloc (BNG)—which chose not to stop their campaigns.

=== Debates ===
2014 European Parliament election debates in Spain
| Date | Organizer(s) | Moderator(s) | P Present (Note: Denotes a main invitee attending the event.) S Surrogate (Note: Denotes a main invitee not attending the event, sending a surrogate in their place.) NI Not invited I Invited A Absent invitee | | | | | | | |
| Date | Organizer(s) | Moderator(s) | PP | PSOE | CEU | IP | UPyD | EPDD | Audience | Refs |
|---|---|---|---|---|---|---|---|---|---|---|
| 15 May | RTVE | María Casado | P Cañete | P Valenciano | NI | NI | NI | NI | 12.7% (2,445,000) | |
| 19 May | RTVE | María Casado | S G. Pons | S Jáuregui | P Tremosa | P Meyer | P S. Wagner | P Terricabras | 4.2% (838,000) | |

== Opinion polls ==
The tables below list opinion polling results in reverse chronological order, showing the most recent first and using the dates when the survey fieldwork was done, as opposed to the date of publication. Where the fieldwork dates are unknown, the date of publication is given instead. The highest percentage figure in each polling survey is displayed with its background shaded in the leading party's colour. If a tie ensues, this is applied to the figures with the highest percentages. The "Lead" column on the right shows the percentage-point difference between the parties with the highest percentages in a poll.

=== Voting intention estimates ===
The table below lists weighted voting intention estimates. Refusals are generally excluded from the party vote percentages, while question wording and the treatment of "don't know" responses and those not intending to vote may vary between polling organisations. When available, seat projections determined by the polling organisations are displayed below (or in place of) the percentages in a smaller font.

Color key:

Poll conducted after legal ban on opinion polls Exit poll

| Polling firm/Commissioner | Fieldwork date | Sample size | Turnout | PP | PSOE | CEU | IP | UPyD | EPDD | LPD | C's | PE | Vox | Podemos | Lead |
|---|---|---|---|---|---|---|---|---|---|---|---|---|---|---|---|
| 2014 EP election | 25 May 2014 | —N/a | 43.8 | 26.1; 16 | 23.0; 14 | 5.4; 3 | 10.0; 6 | 6.5; 4 | 4.0; 2 | 2.1; 1 | 3.2; 2 | 1.9; 1 | 1.6; 0 | 8.0; 5 | 3.1 |
| La Gaceta | 25 May 2014 | ? | ? | 32.3; 19/20 | 30.8; 18/19 | 4.4; 3 | 9.7; 5/6 | 5.4; 3/4 | 3.3; 2 | 1.5; 0/1 | 2.7; 1/2 | 0.9; 0 | 1.4; 1 | 2.5; 1/2 | 1.5 |
| TNS Demoscopia | 25 May 2014 | ? | ? | ? 18/20 | ? 15/17 | ? 1/2 | ? 7/8 | ? 3/4 | ? 2/3 | ? 0/1 | ? 1/2 | ? 0/1 | ? 0 | ? 1/2 | ? |
| COPE | 25 May 2014 | ? | ? | ? 18/19 | ? 15/16 | ? 2 | ? 5 | ? 4/5 | ? 2 | ? 0 | ? 1 | ? 1 | ? 0/1 | ? 2/3 | ? |
| GAD3/ABC | 23 May 2014 | ? | 44.0 | ? 18/19 | ? 15 | ? 3 | ? 5 | ? 4 | ? 2 | ? 1 | ? 1/2 | ? 1 | ? 0/1 | ? 2/3 | ? |
| DYM/Libertad Digital | 18 May 2014 | ? | 45 | 33.5; 19 | 25.7; 15/16 | 7.9; 3/4 | 12.2; 6/7 | 7.0; 3/4 | 3.5; 2 | ? 0 | 1.7; 0/1 | 0.3; 0 | 2.0; 1 | 2.4; 1/2 | 7.8 |
| NC Report/La Razón | 8–17 May 2014 | 900 | 43.2 | 32.5; 19/20 | 29.7; 18/19 | 4.5; 2 | 11.8; 6/7 | 6.1; 3 | ? 1/2 | ? 0/1 | ? 1 | ? 1 | ? 0 | ? 0/1 | 2.8 |
| Celeste-Tel/eldiario.es | 12–16 May 2014 | 1,100 | 39.7 | 31.5; 19 | 30.5; 18 | 4.2; 2 | 9.9; 6 | 6.0; 3 | 2.7; 1 | 2.1; 1 | 3.5; 2 | 2.3; 1 | 1.4; 0 | 2.1; 1 | 1.0 |
| Invymark/laSexta | 12–16 May 2014 | ? | ? | 35.4; 21/22 | 28.6; 16/17 | 5.6; 3 | 10.2; 5/6 | 6.9; 3/4 | 4.1; 2 | 2.0; 1 | ? 0 | ? 0 | ? 0 | 1.5; 0/1 | 6.8 |
| GAD3/ABC | 12–16 May 2014 | 1,200 | 41.0 | 33.8; 21/22 | 27.9; 17/18 | 5.0; 3 | 8.9; 5 | 5.3; 3 | 3.2; 1/2 | 1.8; 1 | 2.9; 1/2 | 1.4; 0/1 | 0.9; 0 | 3.5; 1/2 | 5.9 |
| Sigma Dos/El Mundo | 13–15 May 2014 | 1,111 | ? | 33.8; 21/22 | 25.7; 15/16 | 5.2; 3 | 10.3; 6 | 6.2; 3/4 | 2.8; 1 | 1.6; 0/1 | 2.9; 1 | 1.5; 0/1 | 1.3; 0 | 3.1; 1/2 | 8.1 |
| Metroscopia/El País | 8–13 May 2014 | 1,200 | 43 | 32.6; 19 | 31.1; 19 | 4.3; 2 | 11.0; 6 | 4.5; 2 | 5.6; 3 | ? 0 | 2.3; 1 | 1.7; 1 | ? 0 | 2.4; 1 | 1.5 |
| GESOCLAB (Note: "GESOCLAB" (in Spanish). 11 May 2014. Archived from the original on 12 May 2014.) | 11 May 2014 | ? | ? | 31.0; 20 | 28.8; 19 | 5.4; 3 | 10.5; 5 | 6.3; 4 | 4.4; 2 | 1.5; 1 | 1.3; 0 | 1.1; 0 | 0.6; 0 | 1.5; 0 | 2.2 |
| NC Report/La Razón | 11 May 2014 | ? | ? | 32.8; 19/20 | 29.9; 17/18 | ? 2/3 | 11.9; 7/8 | 6.2; 3/4 | ? 1/2 | ? 1 | ? 1 | ? 1 | ? 0 | ? 0/1 | 2.9 |
| Celeste-Tel/eldiario.es | 2–8 May 2014 | 1,100 | 39.9 | 31.7; 19/20 | 30.8; 18/19 | 4.2; 2 | 10.1; 6 | 6.1; 3/4 | 2.5; 1 | 2.0; 1 | 2.8; 1 | 2.5; 1 | 1.6; 0/1 | 2.0; 1 | 0.9 |
| Feedback/La Vanguardia | 30 Apr–8 May 2014 | 1,500 | 48.5 | 33.1; 20 | 29.8; 18 | 5.6; 3 | 10.3; 6 | 6.3; 3 | 3.4; 2 | 1.8; 1 | 2.9; 1 | ? 0 | ? 0 | ? 0 | 3.3 |
| Sigma Dos/El Mundo | 28 Apr–8 May 2014 | 1,000 | ? | 34.9; 21/22 | 28.4; 17/18 | 5.5; 3 | 8.8; 5 | 5.6; 3 | ? 1 | 1.6; 1 | 2.3; 1 | ? 0 | ? 0 | 1.8; 1 | 6.5 |
| Sigma Dos/El Mundo | 22–30 Apr 2014 | 1,000 | ? | 34.3; 21/22 | 29.7; 18/19 | 4.9; 3 | 8.5; 5 | 5.9; 3 | 2.8; 1 | ? 0 | 1.7; 1 | ? 0 | ? 0 | 1.6; 1 | 4.6 |
| Demoscopia Servicios/esRadio | 22–30 Apr 2014 | 1,800 | ? | 32.7; 19 | 30.5; 18 | 4.5; 2 | 12.4; 7 | 7.8; 4 | 2.3; 1 | 1.8; 1 | 1.9; 1 | <1.0; 0 | 1.8; 1 | <1.0; 0 | 2.2 |
| Sondea/Público (Note: "Intención de voto, estimación de resultados e interés por la campaña". Sondea Investigación Social (in Spanish). 13 May 2014. Archived from the original on 17 May 2014.) | 9–30 Apr 2014 | 1,995 | 45 | 28.7; 17/19 | 24.8; 14/16 | 3.9; 1/2 | 13.5; 8/9 | 7.6; 4/5 | 4.1; 2/3 | 1.2; 0/1 | 3.6; 1/2 | 2.2; 0/1 | 1.0; 0 | 4.7; 2/3 | 3.9 |
| Random EOMS/IU | 22–28 Apr 2014 | 1,000 | High | 29.5; 18/19 | 23.6; 14/15 | 5.6; 3 | 13.6; 8/9 | 9.2; 5 | 3.7; 2 | 1.5; 0 | 2.4; 1 | 2.3; 1 | 1.3; 0 | 2.9; 1 | 5.9 |
| Random EOMS/IU | 22–28 Apr 2014 | 1,000 | Low | 32.2; 18/19 | 29.9; 17/18 | 4.0; 2 | 12.0; 7/8 | 6.5; 3 | 3.8; 2 | 0.9; 0 | 2.1; 1 | 1.7; 1 | 0.9; 0 | 2.5; 1 | 2.3 |
| CIS | 7–26 Apr 2014 | 4,737 | ? | 33.7; 20/21 | 31.0; 18/19 | 5.5; 3 | 9.3; 5 | 5.3; 3 | 3.7; 2 | 2.1; 1 | 1.2; 0 | 1.2; 0 | 0.5; 0 | 1.8; 1 | 2.7 |
| GAD3/ABC | 21–25 Apr 2014 | 1,007 | 41.2 | 33.2; 21 | 28.6; 18 | 4.9; 3 | 10.7; 6 | 6.7; 4 | 2.3; 1 | 2.2; 1 | 1.4; 0/1 | 1.3; 0/1 | 0.7; 0 | 1.0; 0 | 4.6 |
| Metroscopia/El País | 21–24 Apr 2014 | 1,200 | 43 | 32.6; 20 | 32.2; 19 | 4.7; 2 | 12.0; 7 | 4.6; 2 | 4.2; 2 | ? 0 | 2.1; 1 | 1.8; 1 | ? 0 | ? 0 | 0.4 |
| Sigma Dos/El Mundo | 10–24 Apr 2014 | 1,000 | ? | 33.8; 21/22 | 30.3; 18/19 | ? 2 | 9.6; 6 | 7.0; 4 | 3.0; 1 | ? 0 | ? 1 | ? 0 | ? 0 | ? 0 | 3.5 |
| Sigma Dos/El Mundo | 10–15 Apr 2014 | 1,000 | ? | 33.1; 20/21 | 30.2; 18/19 | 4.2; 2 | 10.4; 6 | 7.2; 4 | 3.2; 2 | 1.3; 0 | 2.3; 1 | 1.1; 0 | 1.1; 0 | 1.2; 0 | 2.9 |
| Invymark/laSexta | 7–11 Apr 2014 | ? | ? | 32.8 | 30.4 | – | 13.0 | 9.0 | – | – | – | – | – | – | 2.4 |
| NC Report/La Razón | 17–22 Mar 2014 | 900 | 42.0 | 30.4; 18/19 | 28.3; 16/17 | 4.5; 2/3 | 12.1; 7/8 | 7.3; 4/5 | 3.9; 2 | – | 2.8; 1 | 3.2; 1/2 | 2.2; 1 | – | 2.1 |
| Invymark/laSexta | 17–21 Mar 2014 | ? | ? | 32.6 | 30.9 | – | 13.2 | 9.2 | – | – | – | – | – | – | 1.7 |
| Metroscopia/El País | 11–19 Mar 2014 | 1,600 | 40 | 25.7; 16 | 29.0; 18 | 4.0; 2 | 14.1; 9 | 8.4; 5 | 4.5; 2 | 1.8; 1 | 2.0; 1 | 1.2; 0 | 0.9; 0 | 0.8; 0 | 3.3 |
| Metroscopia/El País | 12–20 Feb 2014 | 1,200 | 46 | 26.3; 16 | 28.1; 18 | 5.1; 3 | 14.5; 9 | 8.1; 5 | 3.3; 2 | – | 1.7; 1 | – | – | – | 1.8 |
| Sondeos R.A. (Note: "ENCUESTA-TRACK ELECTORAL Elecciones Europeas en España (I)". Sondeos R.A. España (in Spanish). 17 February 2014.) | 13–15 Feb 2014 | 400 | 48.5 | 28.3; 17/18 | 29.0; 18/19 | 5.0; 2/3 | 12.6; 7/8 | 8.7; 4/5 | 3.2; 1/2 | – | 3.5; 0/2 | – | – | – | 0.7 |
| GAD3/ABC | 5–13 Feb 2014 | 1,000 | 41.0 | 31.2; 20 | 29.2; 18 | 5.1; 3 | 11.1; 7 | 7.7; 4 | 3.4; 2 | – | 1.3; 0 | – | 1.4; 0 | – | 2.0 |
| DYM/El Confidencial | 27 Jan–10 Feb 2014 | 1,165 | 50 | 28.2; 17 | 30.3; 19 | 3.0; 1 | 13.5; 7 | 6.3; 3 | 4.8; 2 | – | – | – | – | – | 2.1 |
| Demoscopia Servicios/esRadio | 9 Feb 2014 | ? | ? | 30.1; 19 | 27.3; 17 | – | 13.7; 8 | ? 4 | – | – | ? 1 | – | 3.8; 1/2 | – | 2.8 |
| Invymark/laSexta | 3–7 Feb 2014 | ? | ? | 33.3 | 30.0 | – | 12.7 | 9.4 | – | – | – | – | – | – | 3.3 |
| NC Report/La Razón | 27–31 Jan 2014 | 900 | 41.6 | 30.1; 18/19 | 28.1; 17/18 | 4.6; 2/3 | 12.4; 7/8 | 7.7; 4/5 | 4.2; 2 | – | 2.7; 1 | 3.1; 1/2 | 2.2; 1 | – | 2.0 |
| GESOP/El Periódico | 20–23 Jan 2014 | 1,000 | ? | 31.6; 19 | 28.0; 17 | 5.2; 3 | 11.5; 7 | 9.3; 5 | 3.4; 2 | – | 3.1; 1 | – | – | – | 3.6 |
| Metroscopia/El País | 17–23 Jan 2014 | 1,200 | 46 | 26.4; 16 | 28.0; 17 | 5.3; 3 | 14.5; 9 | 8.0; 5 | 5.1; 3 | – | 2.0; 1 | – | – | – | 1.6 |
| Invymark/laSexta | 16–20 Dec 2013 | ? | 42.4 | 34.5 | 31.7 | – | 12.4 | 9.0 | – | – | – | – | – | – | 2.8 |
| GESOP/El Periódico | 25–28 Nov 2013 | 1,000 | ? | 32.4; 20/21 | 27.9; 17/18 | 4.8; 2 | 9.9; 6/7 | 8.3; 4/5 | 4.8; 2 | – | 3.5; 1/2 | – | – | – | 4.5 |
| Metroscopia/El País | 7 Oct–14 Nov 2013 | 3,600 | 46 | 29.0; 18 | 27.9; 17 | 4.3; 2 | 14.3; 9 | 8.2; 5 | 5.5; 3 | – | – | – | – | – | 1.1 |
| NC Report/La Razón | 28–31 Oct 2013 | ? | 41.5 | 32.0; 19/20 | 27.9; 16/17 | 5.0; 2/3 | 12.7; 7/8 | 8.9; 5/6 | 4.8; 2/3 | – | – | 2.8; 1/2 | – | – | 4.1 |
| GESOP/El Periódico | 25–28 Jun 2013 | 1,000 | ? | 32.1; 20/21 | 28.5; 17/18 | 3.5; 1/2 | 12.4; 7/8 | 9.0; 5/6 | 4.0; 2 | – | – | – | – | – | 3.6 |
| DYM/ZoomNews | 12–25 Jun 2013 | 1,051 | ? | 31.6; 19 | 27.9; 16 | 6.0; 3 | 18.1; 10 | 5.5; 3 | 5.9; 3 | – | – | – | – | – | 3.7 |
| Simple Lógica | 3–11 Jun 2013 | 1,018 | 41.6 | 33.6 | 25.9 | 5.5 | 11.6 | 11.1 | 4.4 | – | – | – | – | – | 7.7 |
| Metroscopia/El País | 5–6 Jun 2013 | 1,000 | 50–52 | 27.2; 17 | 26.0; 16 | 4.8; 3 | 14.7; 9 | 10.3; 6 | 5.1; 3 | – | – | – | – | – | 1.2 |
| JM&A/La Voz de Galicia (Note: "Las elecciones europeas preocupan a los políticos". La Voz de Galicia (in Spanish). 19 April 2013. Archived from the original on 23 April 2013.) | 19 Apr 2013 | ? | 37.4 | 29.6; 17 | 26.7; 16 | – | 11.0; 6 | 9.0; 5 | – | – | – | – | – | – | 2.9 |
| 2009 EP election | 7 Jun 2009 | —N/a | 44.9 | 42.1; 24 | 38.8; 23 | 5.1; 3 | 3.7; 2 | 2.9; 1 | 2.5; 1 | 1.1; 0 | 0.1; 0 | – | – | – | 3.3 |

=== Voting preferences ===
The table below lists raw, unweighted voting preferences.

| Polling firm/Commissioner | Fieldwork date | Sample size | PP | PSOE | CEU | IP | UPyD | EPDD | LPD | C's | PE | Vox | Podemos | Question | X mark | Lead |
|---|---|---|---|---|---|---|---|---|---|---|---|---|---|---|---|---|
| 2014 EP election (Note: Does not include non-resident citizens.) | 25 May 2014 | —N/a | 11.7 | 10.4 | 2.4 | 4.5 | 2.9 | 1.8 | 0.9 | 1.4 | 0.9 | 0.7 | 3.6 | —N/a | 54.2 | 1.3 |
| Metroscopia/El País | 8–13 May 2014 | 1,200 | 12.6 | 12.3 | 1.8 | 7.6 | 3.1 | 2.7 | 0.9 | 1.4 | 1.0 | 0.7 | 1.2 | 32.1 | 15.1 | 0.3 |
| Random EOMS/IU | 22–28 Apr 2014 | 1,000 | 15.7 | 12.1 | – | 9.1 | 6.1 | – | – | – | – | – | – | – | – | 3.6 |
| CIS | 7–26 Apr 2014 | 4,737 | 14.2 | 14.1 | 2.6 | 5.2 | 3.0 | 2.4 | 1.0 | 0.6 | 0.6 | 0.3 | 0.8 | 25.9 | 23.8 | 0.1 |
| Metroscopia/El País | 21–24 Apr 2014 | 1,200 | 15.8 | 12.1 | 1.9 | 6.7 | 3.3 | 1.7 | 0.8 | 1.0 | 1.2 | 0.3 | 1.1 | 34.2 | 12.1 | 3.7 |
| Metroscopia/El País | 11–19 Mar 2014 | 1,600 | 11.6 | 13.2 | 1.7 | 6.4 | 4.0 | 2.0 | 0.8 | 0.7 | 0.5 | 0.6 | 0.3 | 39.3 | 12.3 | 1.6 |
| Metroscopia/El País | 12–20 Feb 2014 | 1,200 | 11.6 | 12.8 | 2.4 | 8.3 | 4.1 | 1.7 | 0.5 | 0.6 | 0.5 | 0.6 | 0.4 | 34.3 | 15.8 | 1.2 |
| GESOP/El Periódico | 20–23 Jan 2014 | 1,000 | 15.5 | 13.8 | 2.7 | 6.3 | 4.6 | 1.1 | 0.5 | 1.5 | 0.3 | – | – | 32.9 | 13.6 | 1.7 |
| Metroscopia/El País | 17–23 Jan 2014 | 1,200 | 11.3 | 11.3 | 2.8 | 6.2 | 3.0 | 1.8 | 0.5 | 0.7 | 0.6 | 0.2 | 0.2 | 38.8 | 16.3 | Tie |
| GESOP/El Periódico | 25–28 Nov 2013 | 1,000 | 13.7 | 15.4 | 1.8 | 6.5 | 3.9 | 1.6 | 0.7 | 1.8 | 0.6 | – | – | 29.7 | 15.7 | 1.7 |
| Metroscopia/El País | 7 Oct–14 Nov 2013 | 3,600 | 12.5 | 11.2 | 1.4 | 6.5 | 3.2 | 2.2 | – | – | – | – | – | 40.1 | 14.2 | 1.3 |
| GESOP/El Periódico | 25–28 Jun 2013 | 1,000 | 14.0 | 14.4 | 1.2 | 6.0 | 3.8 | 1.2 | 0.6 | – | 0.4 | – | – | 30.3 | 18.8 | 0.4 |
| Simple Lógica | 3–11 Jun 2013 | 1,018 | 12.2 | 8.3 | 2.3 | 5.4 | 4.2 | 2.2 | – | – | – | – | – | 24.1 | 36.5 | 3.9 |
| 2009 EP election | 7 Jun 2009 | —N/a | 19.3 | 17.6 | 2.3 | 1.7 | 1.3 | 1.1 | 0.5 | 0.1 | – | – | – | —N/a | 54.0 | 1.7 |

=== Victory preferences ===
The table below lists opinion polling on the victory preferences for each party in the event of a European Parliament election taking place.

| Polling firm/Commissioner | Fieldwork date | Sample size | PP | PSOE | Other/ None | Question | Lead |
|---|---|---|---|---|---|---|---|
| Feedback/La Vanguardia | 30 Apr–8 May 2014 | 1,500 | 25.1 | 37.4 | 26.9 | 10.6 | 12.3 |
| Metroscopia/El País | 11–19 Mar 2014 | 1,600 | 20.0 | 38.0 | 21.0 | 21.0 | 18.0 |

=== Victory likelihood ===
The table below lists opinion polling on the perceived likelihood of victory for each party in the event of a European Parliament election taking place.

| Polling firm/Commissioner | Fieldwork date | Sample size | PP | PSOE | CEU | IP | UPyD | EPDD | LPD | C's | PE | Vox | Podemos | Other/ None | Question | Lead |
|---|---|---|---|---|---|---|---|---|---|---|---|---|---|---|---|---|
| Sigma Dos/El Mundo | 13–15 May 2014 | 1,111 | 53.2 | 13.5 | – | – | – | – | – | – | – | – | – | – | 33.2 | 39.7 |
| Feedback/La Vanguardia | 30 Apr–8 May 2014 | 1,500 | 54.8 | 19.1 | – | – | – | – | – | – | – | – | – | 3.9 | 22.2 | 35.7 |
| CIS | 7–26 Apr 2014 | 4,737 | 45.3 | 13.7 | 0.4 | 0.4 | 0.4 | 0.1 | 0.1 | 0.0 | 0.1 | 0.0 | 0.1 | 1.5 | 37.9 | 31.6 |

== Results ==
=== Overall ===
← Summary of the 25 May 2014 European Parliament election results in Spain →
| Parties and alliances | Popular vote | | | Seats | |
| Parties and alliances | Votes | % | ±pp | Total | +/− |
|---|---|---|---|---|---|
| People's Party (PP) | 4,098,339 | 26.09 | −16.03 | 16 | −8 |
| Spanish Socialist Workers' Party (PSOE) | 3,614,232 | 23.01 | −15.77 | 14 | −9 |
| Plural Left (IP)^{1} | 1,575,308 | 10.03 | +6.32 | 6 | +4 |
| We Can (Podemos) | 1,253,837 | 7.98 | New | 5 | +5 |
| Union, Progress and Democracy (UPyD) | 1,022,232 | 6.51 | +3.66 | 4 | +3 |
| Coalition for Europe (CEU)^{2} | 851,971 | 5.42 | +0.60 | 3 | ±0 |
| The Left for the Right to Decide (EPDD)^{3} | 630,072 | 4.01 | +2.60 | 2 | +1 |
| Citizens–Party of the Citizenry (C's)^{4} | 497,146 | 3.16 | +3.02 | 2 | +2 |
| The Peoples Decide (LPD)^{5} | 326,464 | 2.08 | −0.06 | 1 | +1 |
| European Spring (PE)^{6} | 302,266 | 1.92 | +1.56 | 1 | +1 |
| Vox (Vox) | 246,833 | 1.57 | New | 0 | ±0 |
| Animalist Party Against Mistreatment of Animals (PACMA) | 177,499 | 1.13 | +0.87 | 0 | ±0 |
| Blank Seats (EB) | 115,682 | 0.74 | New | 0 | ±0 |
| Citizens' Democratic Renewal Movement (RED) | 105,666 | 0.67 | New | 0 | ±0 |
| X Party, Party of the Future (Partido X) | 100,561 | 0.64 | New | 0 | ±0 |
| Andalusian Party (PA)^{7} | 49,523 | 0.32 | +0.15 | 0 | ±0 |
| Pirate Confederation–European Pirates (Piratas) | 38,690 | 0.25 | New | 0 | ±0 |
| Asturias Forum (FAC) | 32,962 | 0.21 | New | 0 | ±0 |
| Electors' Group for the Disabled and Rare Diseases (DER) | 32,833 | 0.21 | New | 0 | ±0 |
| Zero Cuts (Recortes Cero) | 30,827 | 0.20 | New | 0 | ±0 |
| Communist Party of the Peoples of Spain (PCPE) | 29,324 | 0.19 | +0.09 | 0 | ±0 |
| Feminist Initiative (IFem) | 23,140 | 0.15 | +0.09 | 0 | ±0 |
| Spanish Phalanx of the CNSO (FE de las JONS) | 21,687 | 0.14 | +0.08 | 0 | ±0 |
| United Free Citizens (CILUS) | 18,287 | 0.12 | New | 0 | ±0 |
| Social Impulse (Impulso Social)^{8} | 17,879 | 0.11 | −0.08 | 0 | ±0 |
| Spain on the Move (LEM) | 17,035 | 0.11 | New | 0 | ±0 |
| Humanist Party (PH) | 14,896 | 0.09 | +0.05 | 0 | ±0 |
| National Democracy (DN) | 13,079 | 0.08 | +0.02 | 0 | ±0 |
| Europe Project (ACNV–BAR–PRAO–REPO–UNIO) | 11,502 | 0.07 | New | 0 | ±0 |
| Land Party (PT) | 9,940 | 0.06 | New | 0 | ±0 |
| Individual Freedom Party (P–LIB) | 9,670 | 0.06 | New | 0 | ±0 |
| Republican Social Movement (MSR) | 8,909 | 0.06 | +0.02 | 0 | ±0 |
| United Extremadura (EU) | 8,821 | 0.06 | +0.03 | 0 | ±0 |
| Republican Alternative (ALTER) | 8,593 | 0.05 | New | 0 | ±0 |
| For the Republic, for the Rupture with the European Union (RRUE)^{9} | 8,309 | 0.05 | −0.03 | 0 | ±0 |
| Internationalist Solidarity and Self-Management (SAIn) | 6,929 | 0.04 | ±0.00 | 0 | ±0 |
| Regionalist Party of the Leonese Country (PREPAL) | 6,759 | 0.04 | +0.01 | 0 | ±0 |
| Extremadurans for Europe (IPEx–PREx–CREx) | 5,967 | 0.04 | New | 0 | ±0 |
| Red Current Movement (MCR) | 4,980 | 0.03 | New | 0 | ±0 |
| Blank ballots | 361,567 | 2.30 | +0.91 | | |
| Total | 15,710,216 | | | 54 | ±0 |
| Valid votes | 15,710,216 | 98.20 | −1.18 | | |
| Invalid votes | 287,925 | 1.80 | +1.18 | | |
| Votes cast / turnout | 15,998,141 | 43.81 | −1.09 | | |
| Abstentions | 20,515,943 | 56.19 | +1.09 | | |
| Registered voters | 36,514,084 | | | | |
Sources
Footnotes: ^{1} Plural Left results are compared to United Left–Initiative for Catalonia Greens: The Left totals in the 2009 election.; ^{2} Coalition for Europe (2014) results are compared to Coalition for Europe (2009) totals in the 2009 election, not including results in Andalusia and the Valencian Community.; ^{3} The Left for the Right to Decide results are compared to Europe of the Peoples–Greens totals in the 2009 election, not including results in Aragon, the Basque Country, Galicia and Navarre.; ^{4} Citizens–Party of the Citizenry results are compared to Libertas–Citizens of Spain totals in the 2009 election.; ^{5} The Peoples Decide results are compared to the combined totals of Internationalist Initiative–Solidarity among Peoples, Europe of the Peoples–Greens in the Basque Country, Galicia and Navarre and Andecha Astur in the 2009 election.; ^{6} European Spring results are compared to the combined totals of Coalition for Europe in the Valencian Community, Europe of the Peoples–Greens in Aragon, and For a Fairer World in the 2009 election.; ^{7} Andalusian Party results are compared to Coalition for Europe totals in Andalusia in the 2009 election.; ^{8} Social Impulse results are compared to the combined totals of Spanish Alternative and Family and Life Party in the 2009 election.; ^{9} For the Republic, for the Rupture with the European Union results are compared to Internationalist Socialist Workers' Party totals in the 2009 election.

Popular vote
| PP | 26.09% |
| PSOE | 23.01% |
| IP | 10.03% |
| Podemos | 7.98% |
| UPyD | 6.51% |
| CEU | 5.42% |
| EPDD | 4.01% |
| C's | 3.16% |
| LPD | 2.08% |
| PE | 1.92% |
| Vox | 1.57% |
| PACMA | 1.13% |
| Others | 4.79% |
| Blank ballots | 2.30% |

Seats
| PP | 29.63% |
| PSOE | 25.93% |
| IP | 11.11% |
| Podemos | 9.26% |
| UPyD | 7.41% |
| CEU | 5.56% |
| EPDD | 3.70% |
| C's | 3.70% |
| LPD | 1.85% |
| PE | 1.85% |

=== Maps ===
Vote winner strength by province.

Vote winner strength by autonomous community.

=== Distribution by European group ===
Summary of political group distribution in the 8th European Parliament (2014–2019)
| Groups | Parties | Seats | Total | % |
|---|---|---|---|---|
| European People's Party (EPP) | People's Party (PP); Democratic Union of Catalonia (UDC) | 16; 1 | 17 | 31.48 |
| Progressive Alliance of Socialists and Democrats (S&D) | Spanish Socialist Workers' Party (PSOE) | 14 | 14 | 25.93 |
| European United Left–Nordic Green Left (GUE/NGL) | We Can (Podemos); United Left (IU); Renewal–Nationalist Brotherhood (Anova); Basque Country Gather (EH Bildu) | 5; 4; 1; 1 | 11 | 20.37 |
| Alliance of Liberals and Democrats for Europe (ALDE) | Union, Progress and Democracy (UPyD); Citizens–Party of the Citizenry (C's); Democratic Convergence of Catalonia (CDC); Basque Nationalist Party (EAJ/PNV) | 4; 2; 1; 1 | 8 | 14.81 |
| Greens–European Free Alliance (Greens/EFA) | Republican Left of Catalonia (ERC); New Catalan Left (NECat); Initiative for Catalonia Greens (ICV); Commitment Coalition (Compromís) | 1; 1; 1; 1 | 4 | 7.41 |
| Total | | 54 | 54 | 100.00 |

=== Elected legislators ===
The following table lists the elected legislators:

Elected legislators
| # | Name | List |
|---|---|---|
| 1 | Miguel Arias Cañete | PP |
| 2 | Elena Valenciano Martínez-Orozco | PSOE |
| 3 | Esteban González Pons | PP |
| 4 | Ramón Jáuregui Atondo | PSOE |
| 5 | Willy Enrique Meyer Pleite | IP |
| 6 | María Teresa Jiménez Becerril Barrio | PP |
| 7 | Pablo Iglesias Turrión | Podemos |
| 8 | Soledad Cabezón Ruiz | PSOE |
| 9 | Luis de Grandes Pascual | PP |
| 10 | Francisco Sosa Wagner | UPyD |
| 11 | Juan Fernando López Aguilar | PSOE |
| 12 | Ramón Tremosa i Balcells | CEU |
| 13 | Pilar del Castillo Vera | PP |
| 14 | Paloma López Bermejo | IP |
| 15 | Iratxe García Pérez | PSOE |
| 16 | Ramón Luis Valcárcel Siso | PP |
| 17 | Josep Maria Terricabras i Nogueras | EPDD |
| 18 | María Teresa Rodríguez-Rubio Vázquez | Podemos |
| 19 | Javier López Fernández | PSOE |
| 20 | María Rosa Estarás Ferragut | PP |
| 21 | Ernest Urtasun Domenech | IP |
| 22 | Inmaculada Rodríguez-Piñero Fernández | PSOE |
| 23 | Francisco José Millán Mon | PP |
| 24 | María Teresa Pagazaurtundúa Ruiz | UPyD |
| 25 | Javier Nart Peñalver | C's |
| 26 | Pablo Zalba Bidegain | PP |
| 27 | Enrique Guerrero Salom | PSOE |
| 28 | Izaskun Bilbao Barandica | CEU |
| 29 | Carlos Jiménez Villarejo | Podemos |
| 30 | Verónica Lope Fontagne | PP |
| 31 | Eider Gardiazábal Rubial | PSOE |
| 32 | Marina Albiol Guzmán | IP |
| 33 | Antonio López-Istúriz White | PP |
| 34 | José Blanco López | PSOE |
| 35 | Santiago Fisas Ayxelà | PP |
| 36 | Fernando Maura Barandiarán | UPyD |
| 37 | Clara Eugenia Aguilera García | PSOE |
| 38 | Iosu Mirena Juaristi Abaunz | LPD |
| 39 | Gabriel Mato Adrover | PP |
| 40 | Ernest Maragall i Mira | EPDD |
| 41 | Maria Lidia Senra Rodríguez | IP |
| 42 | María Dolores "Lola" Sánchez Caldentey | Podemos |
| 43 | Jordi Sebastià Talavera | PE |
| 44 | Sergio Gutiérrez Prieto | PSOE |
| 45 | María del Pilar Ayuso González | PP |
| 46 | Francesc de Paula Gambús i Millet | CEU |
| 47 | Inés Ayala Sender | PSOE |
| 48 | María Esther Herranz García | PP |
| 49 | Ángela Rosa Vallina de la Noval | IP |
| 50 | Jonás Fernández Álvarez | PSOE |
| 51 | Agustín Díaz de Mera García Consuegra | PP |
| 52 | Beatriz Becerra Basterrechea | UPyD |
| 53 | Pablo Echenique Robba | Podemos |
| 54 | Juan Carlos Girauta Vidal | C's |

== Aftermath ==
=== Outcome ===
The election resulted in a massive loss of support for the two main political parties of Spain, which together fell from a combined total of 80.9% in the previous European election to a record-low 49.1% of the vote (a net total of −31.8 pp, about −16.0 each one). Podemos, a party founded four months previously running on an anti-austerity platform, won an unprecedented 8.0% of the vote and 5 out of 54 seats to the European Parliament; the best result ever scored in Spain by a newly created party in its first electoral test.

The People's Party (PP) came out on top in most autonomous communities except in Andalusia, Asturias and Extremadura, where the PSOE won; the Basque Country, where the PNV prevailed; and Catalonia, where ERC scored first place for the first time in 80 years. In these last two communities the PP polled in fourth and fifth places, respectively. Significant were, however, their results in Madrid, Valencian Community and Murcia; in the first two it polled below the 30% mark for the first time in 25 years, while in the latter it experienced a spectacular drop in support, falling from the 60% mark it had maintained since the 2000 general election to below 40% of the vote. Also, except for the autonomous cities of Ceuta and Melilla, it didn't surpass the 40% mark in any region, not even its strongholds of Galicia (where it polled a mere 35%), Castile and León or Castile-La Mancha (38% in both of them).

The Spanish Socialist Workers' Party (PSOE), except for those communities where it won, experienced a significant drop in support. It suffered most notably in Catalonia and the Basque Country (where it finished in third place). In Catalonia in particular, the PSOE's sister party, the Socialists' Party of Catalonia (PSC), had previously won all general and European elections held in the region—except for those of 1994 and 2011, where it polled second just behind Convergence and Union.

Other parties benefiting from the collapse in support for the PP and PSOE parties were United Left-led Plural Left (IP) coalition, which with a 10.0% obtained its best results nationally since 1996, and Union, Progress and Democracy (UPyD), whose 6.5% would remain the highest the party would win in a nationwide election before their decline throughout 2015. The Citizens party (C's) entered the European Parliament with 2 seats and 3.2% of the vote.

=== Bipartisanship crisis ===
The election backlash had immediate consequences on the Socialist party (PSOE), which scored its worst result ever in an election held at a nationwide scale: a bare 23.0% of the vote, compared to the already disappointing results the party had obtained in the general election of 2011, with 28.8%. Alfredo Pérez Rubalcaba, which had won the party's leadership on a 2012 party federal congress, announced his intention to resign from his post after his party holds an extraordinary federal congress on 19–20 July to elect a new leadership. Rubalcaba also announced his intention not to run in the primaries that would elect the party's candidate for the next general election. Several regional party leaders followed suit and announced their intention to hold regional extraordinary party congresses as well.

On the other hand, People's Party (PP) leaders refused to publicly acknowledge the negative results of the party in the election, despite losing 40% of its 2009 vote and scoring the worst result the party has obtained in a national election since 1989, instead opting to highlight the fact that "they had won the election". Despite this, the party had to cancel the victory celebration that was to be held in their national headquarters in Madrid due to the poor affluence of party supporters which went to the place, an evidence of worse than expected election results. Concerns arose among party regional leaders on the prospects of such electoral results being displayed at the local and regional level in the May 2015 elections, something which could potentially force the PP out from the government of party strongholds' such as Madrid and Valencia.

On 26 May El País ran the headline "Harsh punishment to PP and PSOE", whilst El Mundo declared that "bipartisanship crumbles". International media focused instead on the rise of Podemos party, with the BBC headlining that "Spain's 'we can' party proves it can" or "Spain's Podemos party challenges system", while others stated how the final election results "stunned analysts and pollsters".

=== Abdication of King Juan Carlos I ===
One week after the election, Spanish King Juan Carlos I announced his intention to abdicate in favour of his son, Felipe. Allegedly, the election results had no influence in the King's abdication. Rather, the elderly monarch had taken the decision the day of his 76th birthday in January and had spoken about it with Prime Minister Mariano Rajoy on 31 March and with opposition leader Rubalcaba three days later, but it was not until after the election that he announced it in order not to affect the electoral process. However, abdication was not regulated under the Spanish Constitution of 1978 and thus required the approval of an Organic Law on the matter. PP, PSOE, UPyD, Canarian Coalition (CC), Asturias Forum (FAC) and the Navarrese People's Union (UPN) all pledged their support to the law's approval. Attention then turned to the PSOE leader Alfredo Pérez Rubalcaba as rumours spread about him not resigning right away the day after the election to keep controlling the party so as to ensure the affirmative vote of its parliamentary group on the law. This was received with criticism from several of the party's regional federations but also from its members and the Socialist Youth, openly republican, who demanded the party ask for a referendum on the monarchy issue.

Furthermore, there was speculation on the opportunity of the King abdicating at the time he did. In fact, due to the crisis of the bipartisanship self-evidenced by the European election results, the idea of the King announcing his decision before the 2015 general election, when the election results could translate into PP and PSOE losing a host of seats in the Congress of Deputies, making the building of large majorities more difficult, became extended among public opinion. The fact that the future of the PSOE's position on the monarchy, as well as the future of the party itself, looked uncertain after the debacle in the European election and Rubalcaba's resignation seemed to have also played a key part in precipitating the King's decision. Prime Minister Rajoy said, on the day the King announced he would abdicate, that "This is the best time [for it to happen], within a short time the Prince shall be proclaimed King".

== Bibliography ==
- Ley Orgánica 5/1985, de 19 de junio, del Régimen Electoral General (Organic Law 5/1985). Official State Gazette (in Spanish). 19 June 1985 [version as of 22 September 2012]. BOE-A-1985-11672.
- Treaty of Lisbon amending the Treaty on European Union and the Treaty establishing the European Community (2007/C 306/01). Official Journal of the European Union. 17 December 2007. 12007L/TXT.
- European Council Decision (EU) establishing the composition of the European Parliament (European Council Decision (EU) 2013/312). Official Journal of the European Union. 28 June 2013. 32013D0312.
