= Marina Albiol =

Spanish politician

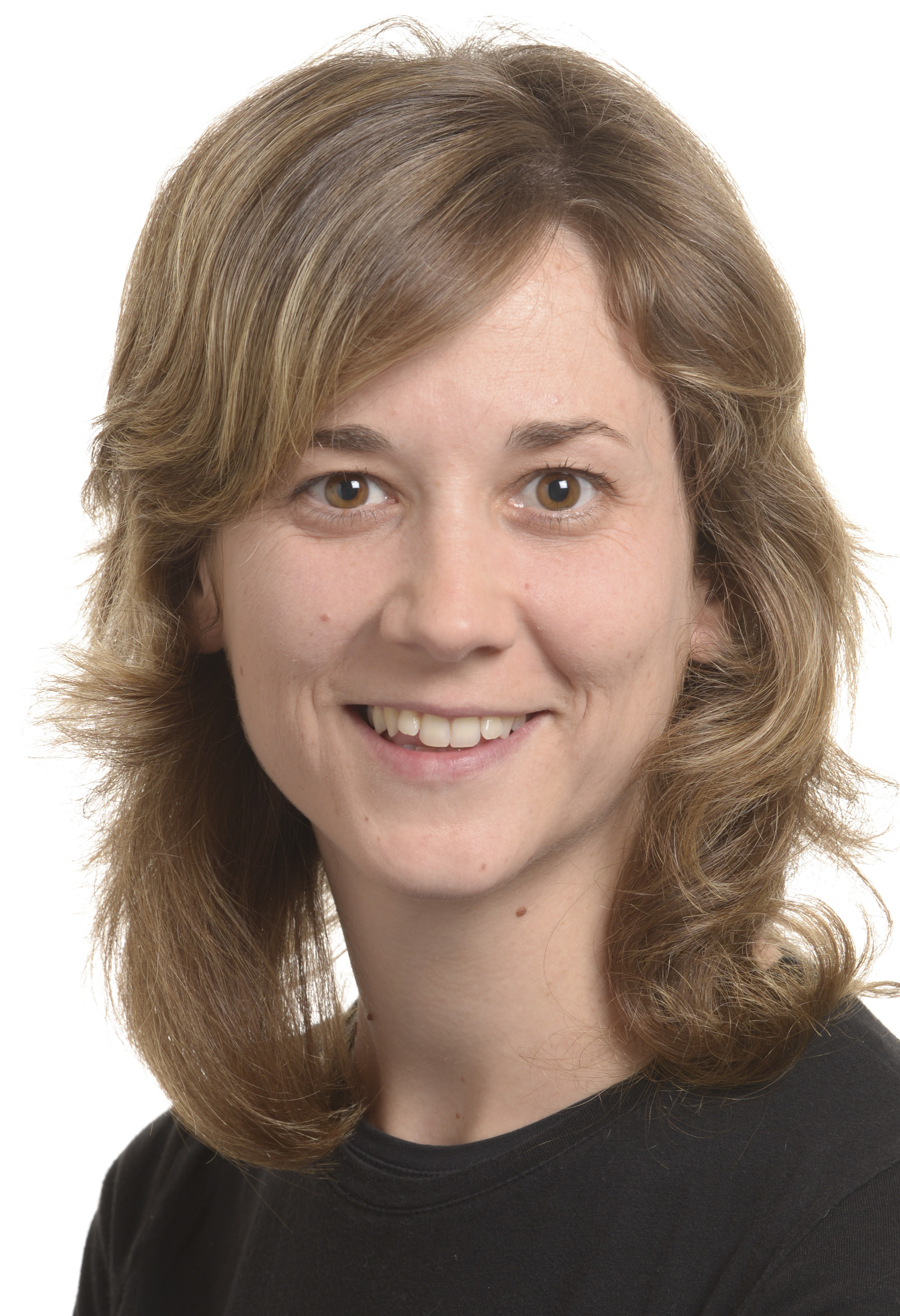

Member of the European Parliament
- In office 1 July 2014 – 2 July 2019
- Constituency: Spain

Member of the Corts Valencianes
- In office 2007–2014
- Constituency: Castellón

Personal details
- Born: 15 December 1982 (age 43) Castellón de la Plana, Spain
- Party: United Left; Communist Party of Spain
- Occupation: Politician, activist

Marina Albiol Guzmán (born 15 December 1982) is a Spanish politician. She served as Member of the European Parliament from 2014 to 2019, integrated in the European United Left–Nordic Green Left (GUE/NGL) political group.

== European Parliament ==
Born on 15 December 1982 in Castellón de la Plana, she earned a diploma in physiotherapy and educational practice.

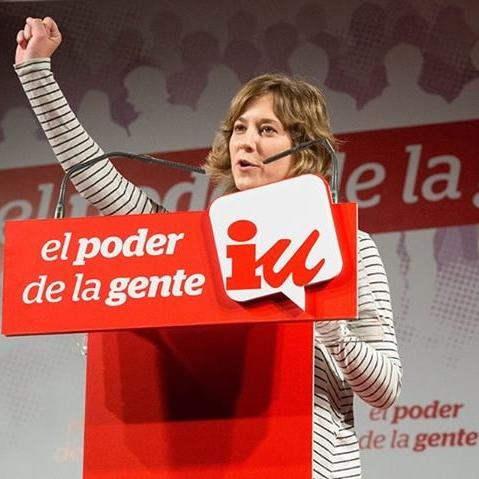
Albiol during the campaign for the 2014 European election

A member of the Communist Party of Spain (PCE) and the United Left (IU), Albiol ran as lead candidate of the Commitment for the Valencian Country coalition in the constituency of Castellón for the 2007 Valencian regional election, and she became a member of the 7th term of the regional parliament.

Albiol, who has also been an activist against oil offshore drilling in the coast of Castellón and in support of the Palestinian people, was reelected in the 2011 regional election, renouncing to her seat after being elected in the 2014 European Parliament election in Spain, in which she ran in the fourth place of the Plural Left coalition list.

During the 8th term of the European Parliament, she was part of the European United Left–Nordic Green Left (GUE-NGL) confederal group. She served in the Committee on Petitions (PETI) and in the Delegation to the Euro-Latin American Parliamentary Assembly (DLAT).

In 2018, Albiol reported a case of mobbing towards workers of the IU delegation in the European Parliament allegedly committed by party MEPs; Albiol, who later described the case as an "anecdote" to be dealt with as an internal affair, announced nonetheless that she would not aspire to repeat as candidate for the 2019 European Parliament election, vowing to remain as grassroots party member doing politics with a lower profile.
