= Ernest Maragall =

Spanish politician

The Honourable Ernest Maragall
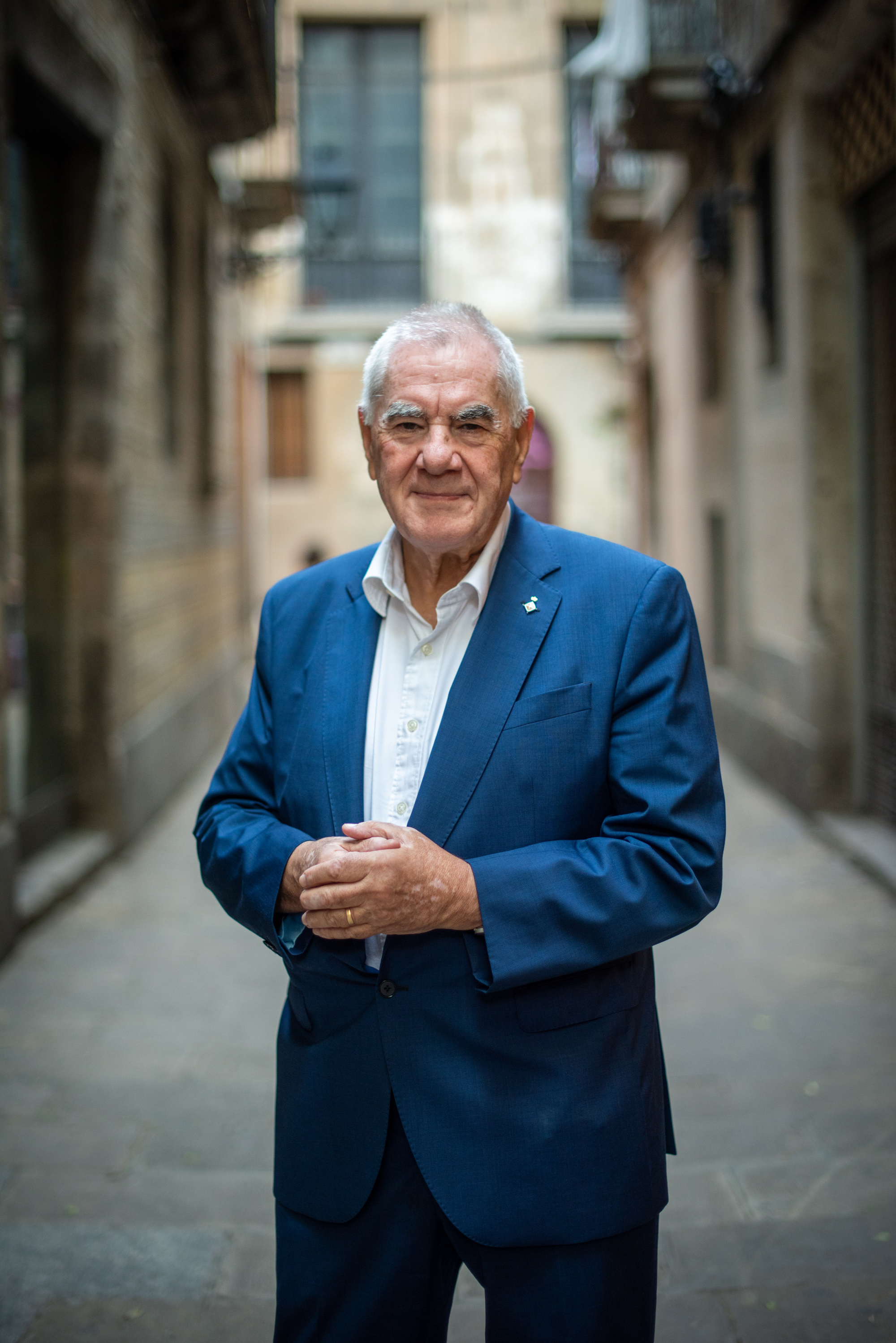
- Maragall in 2019

Minister of Foreign Action, Institutional Relations and Transparency of Catalonia
- In office 2 June 2018 – 22 November 2018
- President: Quim Torra
- Preceded by: Raül Romeva (Direct rule from 27 October 2017)
- Succeeded by: Alfred Bosch

Minister of Education of Catalonia
- In office 29 November 2006 – 29 November 2010
- President: José Montilla
- Preceded by: Joan Manuel del Pozo i Àlvarez
- Succeeded by: Irene Rigau

Member of the European Parliament for Spain
- In office 1 July 2014 – 30 December 2016
- Succeeded by: Jordi Solé i Ferrando

Member of the Parliament of Catalonia
- In office 17 January 2018 – 2 February 2023
- Succeeded by: Adrià Guevara i Figueras
- In office 17 December 2010 – 2 October 2012
- In office 17 November 2006 – 1 December 2006
- Succeeded by: Jordi Terrades i Santacreu
- In office 5 December 2003 – 9 January 2004
- Succeeded by: Bernardo Fernández Martínez
- Constituency: Barcelona

Member of Barcelona City Council
- In office 15 June 2019 – 22 December 2023
- Succeeded by: Rosa Suriñach
- In office 23 June 1995 – 14 June 2004
- Succeeded by: Montserrat Ballarín Espuña

Personal details
- Born: Ernest Maragall i Mira; 5 January 1943 (age 83) Barcelona, Spain
- Party: Workers' Front of Catalonia (1961–1970); Socialist Movement of Catalonia (1970–1974); Socialist Convergence of Catalonia (1974–1976); Socialist Party of Catalonia–Congress (1976–1978); Socialists' Party of Catalonia (1978–2012); New Catalan Left (2012–2014); Left Movement (2014–2018); Republican Left of Catalonia (2018–2024)

Ernest Maragall i Mira (Catalan pronunciation: [əɾˈnez məɾəˈɣaʎ]; born 5 January 1943, in Barcelona) is a Spanish economist, politician, member of the Parliament of Catalonia and former Minister of Foreign Action, Institutional Relations and Transparency of Catalonia. He was previously Minister of Education, a member of the European Parliament and a member of Barcelona City Council.

Born in 1943 in Barcelona, Maragall joined the anti-fascist Workers' Front of Catalonia in his youth. He worked in advertising and marketing before holding several positions in BCC. A socialist, Maragall was one of the founders of the Socialist Convergence of Catalonia and its successors, the Socialist Party of Catalonia–Congress and Socialists' Party of Catalonia (PSC). He left the PSC in 2012 due to its opposition to Catalan independence and founded the pro-independence New Catalan Left which later merged with others to form the Left Movement. He is currently a member of the Republican Left of Catalonia.

Maragall was a member of BCC from 1995 to 2004 and held several senior positions in the socialist administration, including that of his brother Pasqual who was Mayor of Barcelona till 1997. He was elected to the Parliament of Catalonia in November 2003 but resigned upon being appointed secretary of the regional government presided by his brother Pasqual. He was re-elected to the Catalan Parliament in November 2006 but resigned again upon being appointed Minister of Education in the regional government presided by José Montilla. He was re-elected in November 2010 but the socialists lost power to the Convergence and Union and Maragall lost his ministerial post.

Maragall was a member of the European Parliament from July 2014 to December 2016 and in December 2017 he was re-elected to the Catalan Parliament. In June 2018 he became Minister of Foreign Action, Institutional Relations and Transparency.

== Early life and family ==
Maragall was born on 5 January 1943 in Barcelona, Catalonia. He is the grandson of poet Joan Maragall, son of senator Jordi Maragall i Noble and brother of Pasqual Maragall, President of Catalonia and Mayor of Barcelona. He was educated at Virtene School and was a member of the Agrupament Escolta de la Confraria. He was a member of the Workers' Front of Catalonia, an underground resistance movement against the fascist dictatorship of Francisco Franco, from its foundation in 1961.

== Career ==
Maragall worked in advertising and marketing from 1958 and 1970. He then held several positions at Barcelona City Council: computer analyst (1970–79); economist at the Technical Project Office; manager of the Institut Cartogràfic de Barcelona S.A.; and director-general of the Municipal Institute of Information Technology.

== Politics ==
Maragall was one of the founders of the Socialist Convergence of Catalonia (CSC) in 1974. The CSC merged with other groups in 1976 to form the Socialist Party of Catalonia–Congress (PSC–C), a forerunner to the Socialists' Party of Catalonia (PSC). He was a member of the executive committee of the Barcelona branch of the PSC from 1977 to 2012.

=== Local politics ===
Maragall contested the 1995 local elections as a PSC candidate in Barcelona and was elected. He was re-elected at the 1999 and 2003 local elections.

Maragall was councillor of Finance and Public Function (1995–99) and Presidency and Finance (1999-04). He was spokesperson for the city government led by mayor Joan Clos from July from 2001 to June 2003. He was president of the District Council of Sant Andreu, Municipal Institute of Informatics and Municipal Institute of Finance, and vice-president of Municipal Institute of Education. He was the city council's representative in the Federation of Municipalities of Catalonia, vice-president of the Spanish Federation of Municipalities and Provinces' Public Function Commission and vice-president of the Board of Directors of Localret.

=== Regional politics ===
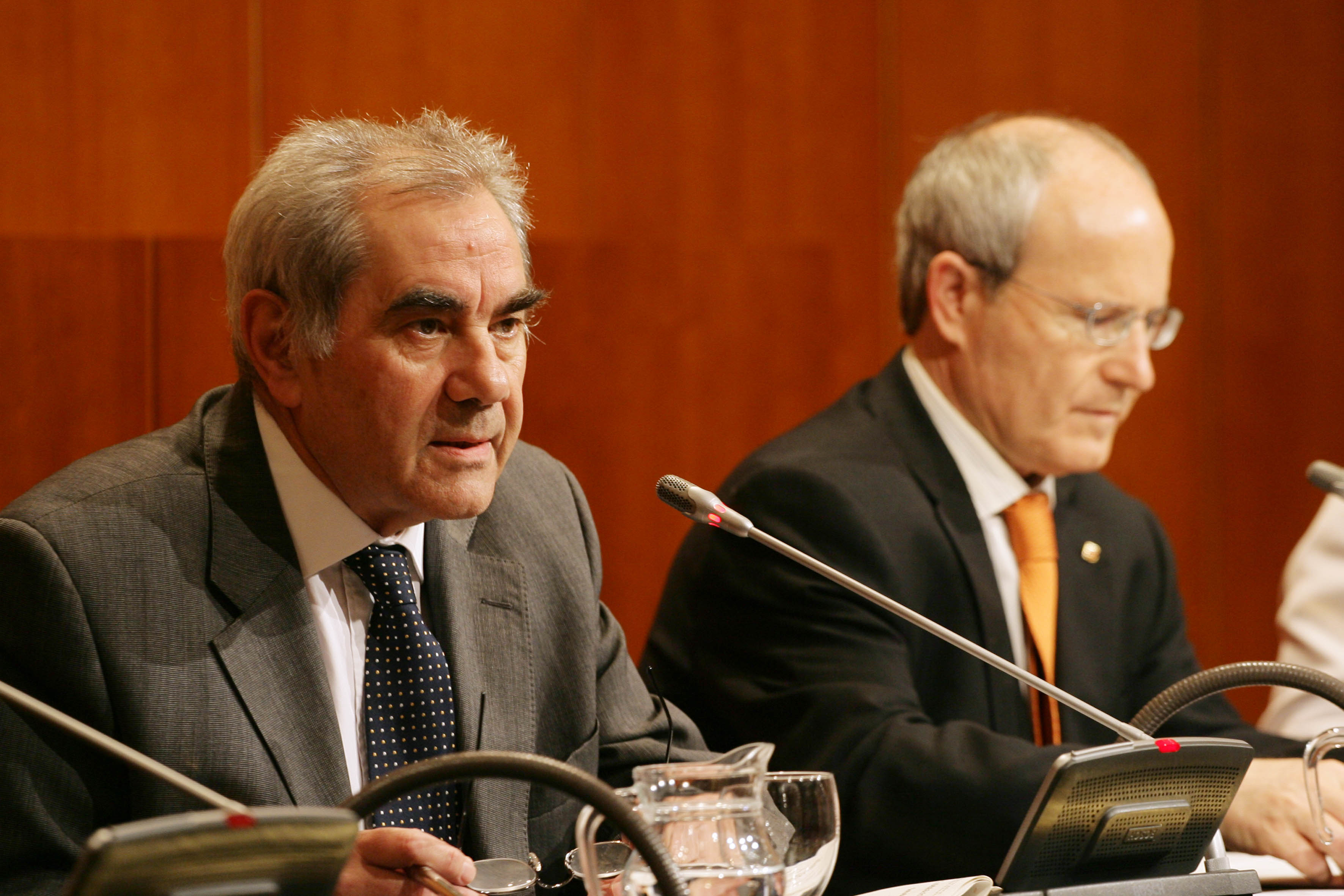
Maragall with President José Montilla in May 2008

Maragall contested the 2003 regional election as a Socialists' Party of Catalonia-Citizens for Change (PSC–CpC) electoral alliance candidate in the Province of Barcelona and was elected to the Parliament of Catalonia. He resigned from parliament in January 2004. He was secretary of the regional government presided by his brother Pasqual from December 2003 to September 2006.

Maragall contested the 2006 regional election as a PSC–CpC electoral alliance candidate in the Province of Barcelona and was re-elected. He resigned from parliament in December 2006. He was Minister of Education from November 2006 to November 2010 in the regional government led by José Montilla.

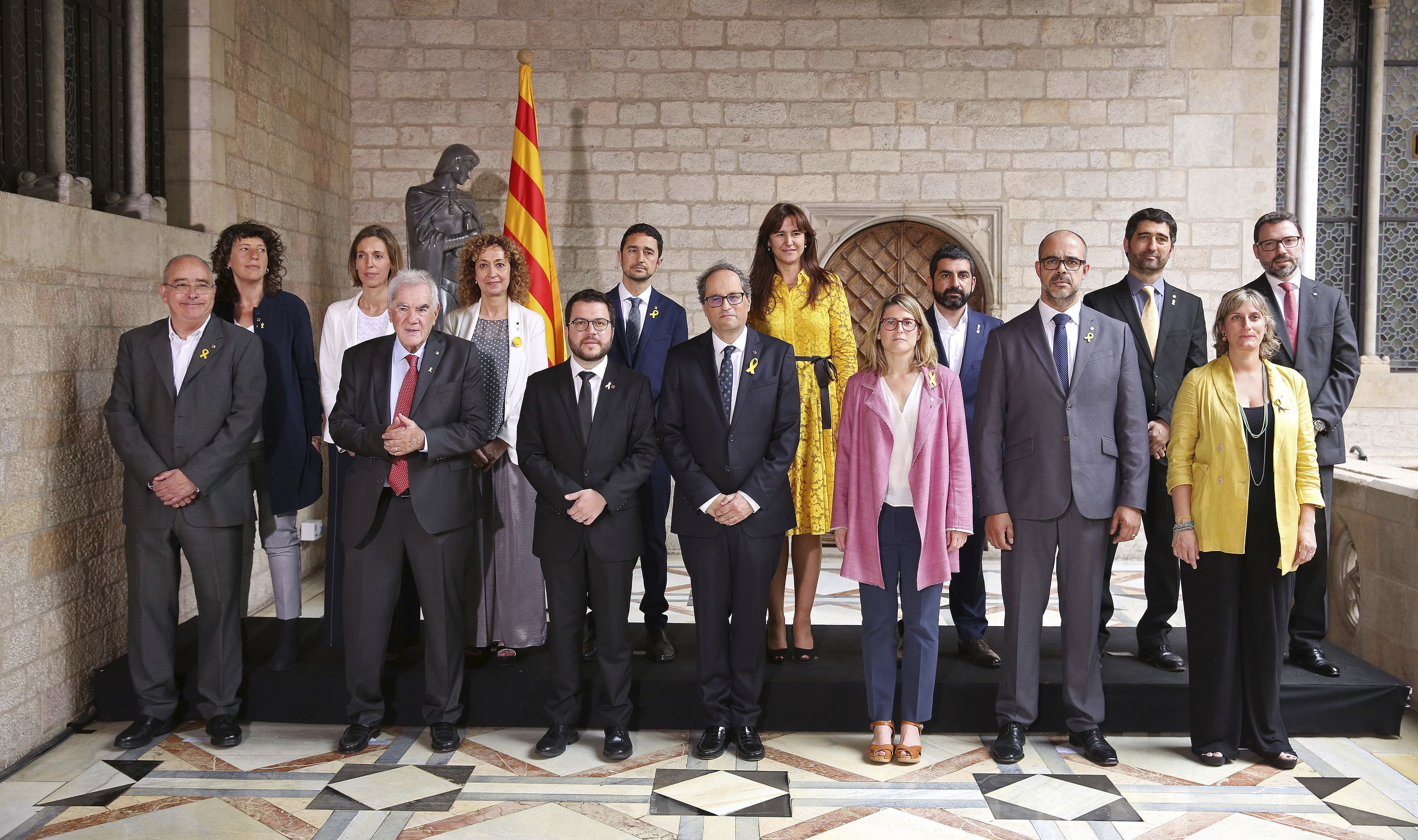
Maragall and other members of the Catalan government on 2 June 2018

Maragall contested the 2010 regional election as a PSC candidate in the Province of Barcelona and was re-elected. Maragall supported Catalan independence but the PSC's leadership opposed this and eventually Maragall and others left the party in October 2012 to form the pro-independence New Catalan Left (NECat). He contested the 2014 European elections as The Left for the Right to Decide (EPDD) electoral alliance candidate and was elected to the European Parliament. NECat merged with Moviment Catalunya to form the Left Movement (MES) in November 2014. In December 2016, half-way through his term, Maragall resigned from the European Parliament to allow Jordi Solé i Ferrando to become an MEP.

Maragall contested the 2017 regional election as a Republican Left of Catalonia–Catalonia Yes electoral alliance candidate in the Province of Barcelona and was elected. At the election Catalan secessionists retained a slim majority in the Catalan Parliament. Maragall was touted as a candidate for President of Catalonia. In May 2018 Maragall announced that he had joined the Republican Left of Catalonia (ERC).

On 19 May 2018 newly elected President Quim Torra nominated a new government in which Maragall was to be Minister of Foreign Action, Institutional Relations and Transparency. He was sworn in on 2 June 2018 at the Palau de la Generalitat de Catalunya.

On 22 July 2024, he announced he was leaving ERC because of the "shame and horror" regarding the disclosure of posters mocking his brother Pasqual's Alzheimer's disease during the campaign of the 2023 Barcelona municipal council election as being created within the ERC ranks.

== Electoral history ==
Electoral history of Ernest Maragall
Election	Constituency	Party	Alliance	No.	Result
1995 local	Barcelona	Socialists' Party of Catalonia		15	Elected
1999 local	Barcelona	Socialists' Party of Catalonia	Socialists' Party of Catalonia-Municipal Progress of Catalonia	7	Elected
2003 local	Barcelona	Socialists' Party of Catalonia	Socialists' Party of Catalonia-Municipal Progress of Catalonia	4	Elected
2003 regional	Province of Barcelona	Socialists' Party of Catalonia	Socialists' Party of Catalonia-Citizens for Change	8	Elected
2006 regional	Province of Barcelona	Socialists' Party of Catalonia	Socialists' Party of Catalonia-Citizens for Change	6	Elected
2010 regional	Province of Barcelona	Socialists' Party of Catalonia		7	Elected
2014 European	Spain	New Catalan Left	The Left for the Right to Decide	2	Elected
2017 regional	Province of Barcelona	Left Movement	Republican Left of Catalonia–Catalonia Yes	13	Elected
