= Jordi Solé i Ferrando =

Catalan politician

Jordi Solé i Ferrando MEP
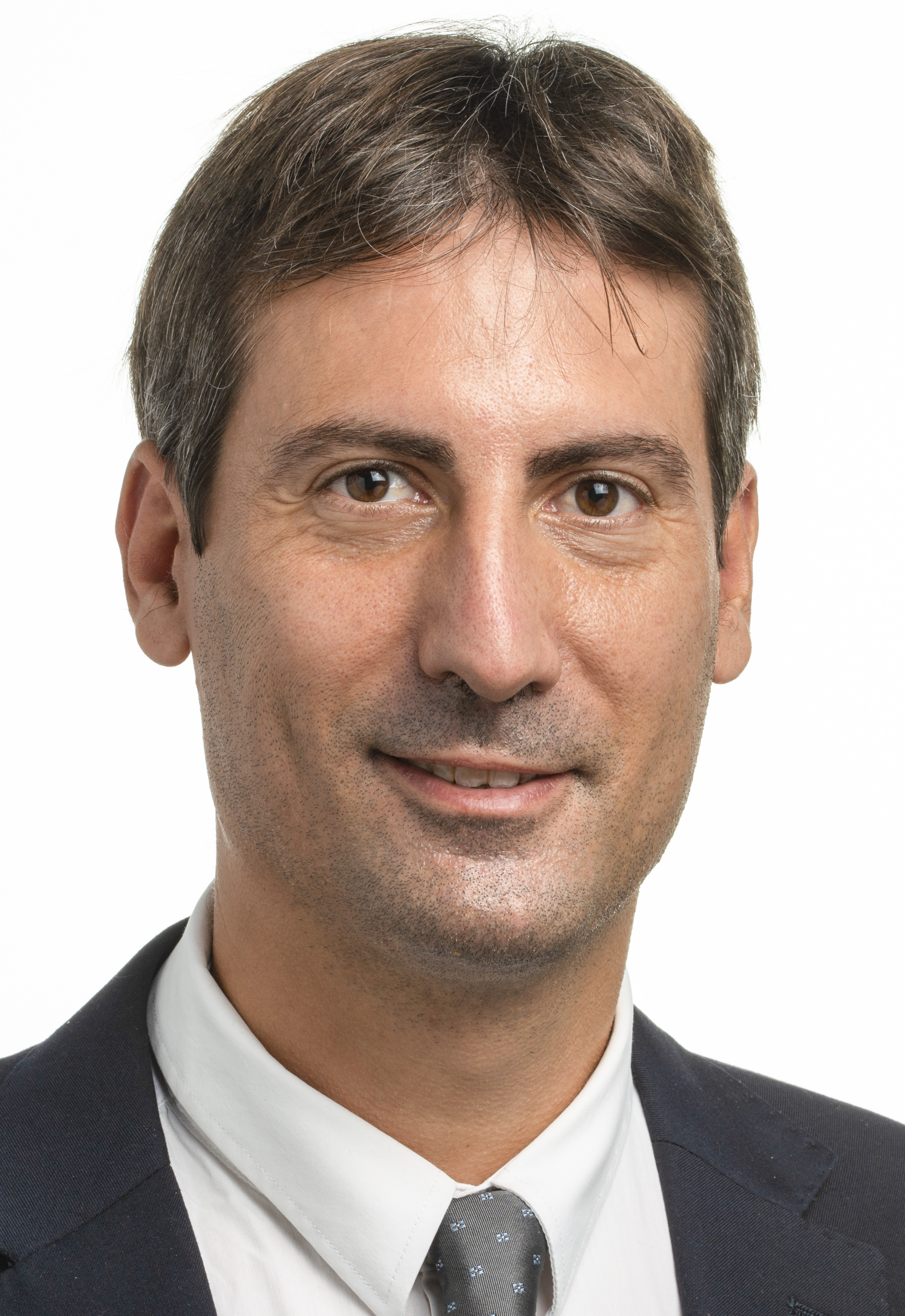

Member of the European Parliament
- Incumbent
- Assumed office 23 July 2020
- Preceded by: Oriol Junqueras (suspended)
- In office 3 January 2017 – 30 June 2019
- Preceded by: Ernest Maragall
- Constituency: Spain

Personal details
- Born: 26 October 1976 (age 49) Caldes de Montbui, Vallès Oriental, Catalonia, Spain
- Party: Republican Left of Catalonia
- Education: Political sciences
- Alma mater: Autonomous University of Barcelona
- Occupation: Politician
- Website: www.jordi-sole.cat

Jordi Solé i Ferrando (born 26 October 1976) is a Catalan politician from Spain. Since January 2017, he has served as a Member of the European Parliament for the Republican Left of Catalonia.

== Parliamentary service ==
- Member, Committee on Foreign Affairs (2017–)
- Member, Committee on Budgets (2017–)
