= Clara Aguilera García =

Spanish politician

Clara Aguilera García MEP
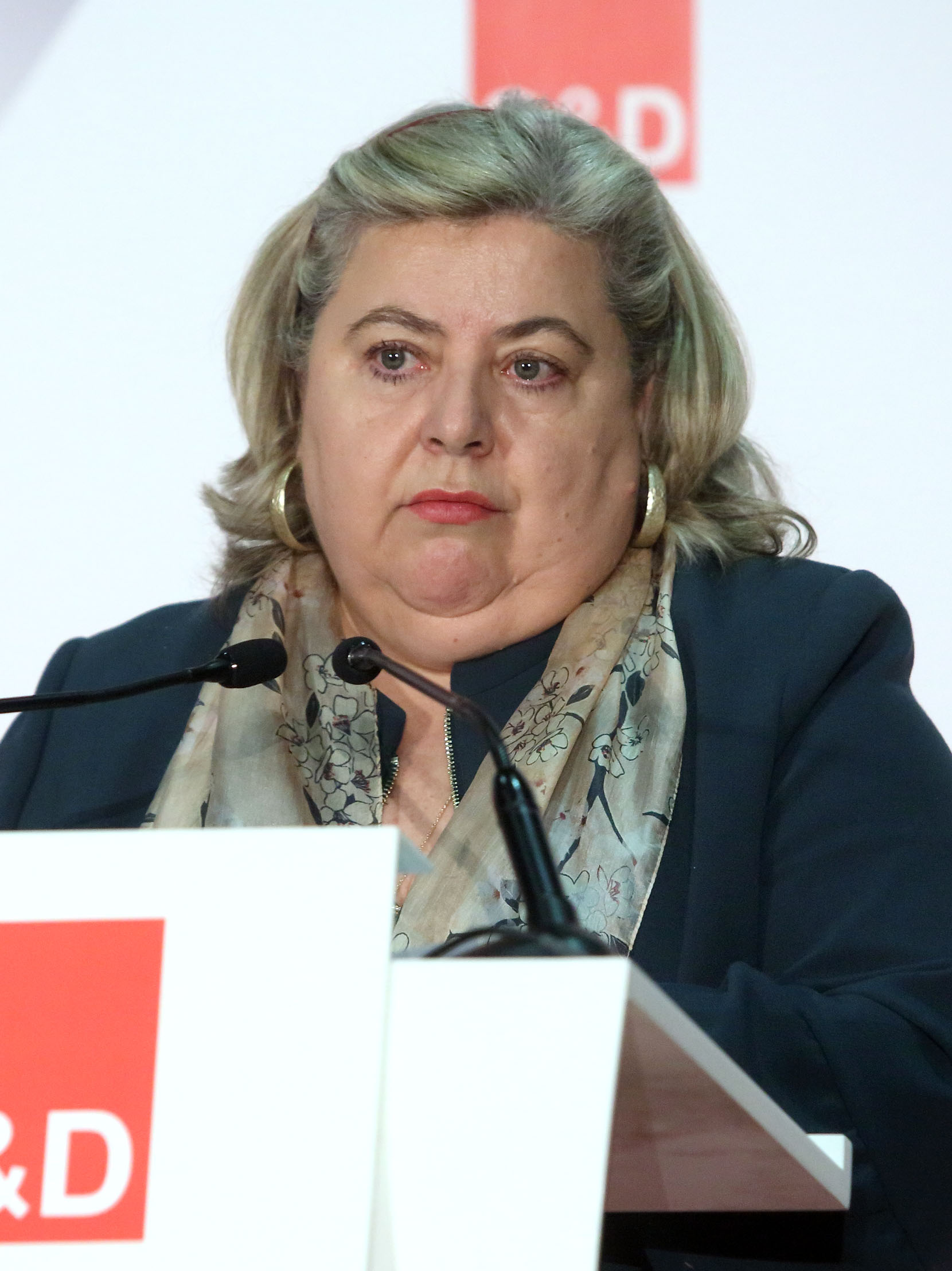

Member of the European Parliament for Spain
- Incumbent
- Assumed office 1 July 2014

Personal details
- Born: 3 January 1964 (age 62) Granada, Andalusia, Spain
- Party: Spanish Socialist Workers' Party
- Occupation: politician

Clara Eugenia Aguilera García (pronounced [ˈklaɾa aɣiˈleɾa ɣaɾˈθi.a]; born 3 January 1964) is a Spanish politician who was elected as a Member of the European Parliament in 2019. In addition to her committee assignments, she is part of the European Parliament Intergroup on Artificial Intelligence and Digital.

In June 2023, Aguilera was the recipient of the Agriculture, Fisheries and Rural Development Award at The Parliament Magazine's annual MEP Awards

Aguilera was featured in the investigative journalistic film "Food for Profit" where she expressed a controversial view on animal welfare. A statement from the documentary, "I am not interested in the happiness of the chicken, the rabbit, or the cat. I eat them anyway," was highlighted in the television program "Le Iene" at the 6:13 mark.
