= New Catalan Left =

New Catalan Left Nova Esquerra Catalana
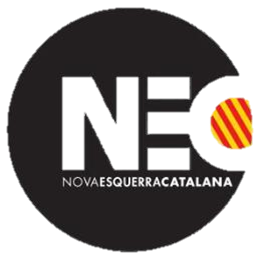
- Leader: Ernest Maragall
- President: Magda Casamitjana
- Founded: 15 December 2012
- Dissolved: 30 November 2014
- Split from: Socialists' Party of Catalonia
- Merged into: Left Movement
- Headquarters: Avda. Diagonal, 449, 4ª 08036, Barcelona
- Ideology: Social democracy Catalanism; Catalan independence
- Political position: Centre-left
- Slogan: Per una esquerra catalana forta i majoritària ("For a strong and majoritarian Catalan left")

Website
- www.novaesquerracatalana.cat

New Catalan Left (Catalan: Nova Esquerra Catalana, NECat) was a Catalanist and pro-independence political party founded in December 2012 as a split from the Socialists' Party of Catalonia (PSC) by Ernest Maragall, brother of former Catalan president Pasqual Maragall. In November 2014, the party was merged into the Left Movement (MES).

== History ==
Following the 11 September 2012 independence demonstration, in which many high-ranking members from the Socialists' Party of Catalonia (PSC) participated—such as Ernest Maragall, Antoni Castells, Marina Geli, Àngel Ros, Laia Bonet or Joan Ignasi Elena, among others—a severe party crisis unveiled within the PSC over a manifesto signed by 145 members of the party's Catalanist faction in favour of a self-determination referendum and the establishment of a Catalan state, contrary to the party's official stance of favouring asymmetric federalism within Spain. Ernest Maragall, former regional education minister between 2006 and 2010 and brother of former Catalan president Pasqual Maragall, understood the manifesto as an attempt to open up a debate on the establishment of a new political space. Maragall had already ruled out running within the PSC's lists for the upcoming 2012 Catalan regional election, after a history of breaking party discipline throughout the legislature in favour both of President Artur Mas's proposal of a fiscal agreement with Spain on 25 July 2012, and of a referendum on self-determination to be held during the next legislature on 27 September.

On 11 October 2012, Maragall announced his intention to leave the PSC and resume the Catalan Party of Europe, and old party founded in 1998 by his brother Pasqual, with the aim of putting together a strong leftist, Catalanist and sovereignist force, joined by other members from the PSC and from the late Citizens for Change platform that supported Pasqual Maragall and later José Montilla's bids in 1999, 2003 and 2006. On 5 November, a public meeting was held under the Esquerra i País slogan (English: "Left and Country") and attended, among others, by Maragall himself, former Republican Left of Catalonia (ERC) leader Josep Lluís Carod-Rovira, Initiative for Catalonia Greens (ICV) MEP Raül Romeva and secretaries-general from ERC and ICV Marta Rovira and Joan Herrera, where there was a vindication for creation of a political project uniting the Catalan left—in a similar fashion to The Olive Tree coalition in Italy—following the 25 November regional election.

Maragall's new party was publicly presented on 15 December under the "New Catalan Left" name as a "genuinely" Catalan left-from-centre alternative, articulated around social democracy and the right to decide. Maragall also advocated for his party supporting a "Yes" choice in the event of a self-determination referendum being held in Catalonia, and supported the formation of a "unitary list" of pro-Catalan independence parties ahead of the 2014 European Parliament election.

In February 2014, Maragall stepped down from the party's presidency in favour of a collective leadership. Shortly after, the party reached an agreement with ERC to form an electoral alliance for the 2014 European Parliament election under the umbrella of The Left for the Right to Decide, after which Maragall proposed in June "an agreement for the reconstruction of the Socialist space and reuniting the Catalan left" including ERC, ICV and dissidents from the PSC, but also the Popular Unity Candidacy (CUP). In August 2014, NECat entered talks with Avancem, the political party founded by former PSC deputy Joan Ignasi Elena, to merge into a new party with the intention of running together in the 2015 Spanish local elections. The talks were joined by another PSC split, Moviment Catalunya, but ended up in Avancem rejecting the merger, leading to the new party—which would be branded as Left Movement on 30 November 2014—being formed by NECat and Moviment only.

== Electoral performance ==
=== European Parliament ===
European Parliament
Election	Votes	%	#	Seats	+/–	Leading candidate
2014	Within EPDD			1 / 54	1	Josep Maria Terricabras
