= Lola Sánchez =

Lola Sánchez may refer to:

- Lola Sánchez (Confederate spy) (1844–1895), spy for the Confederate Army during the American Civil War
- Lola Sánchez Caldentey (born 1978), Spanish politician
