= Jonás Fernández =

Spanish politician

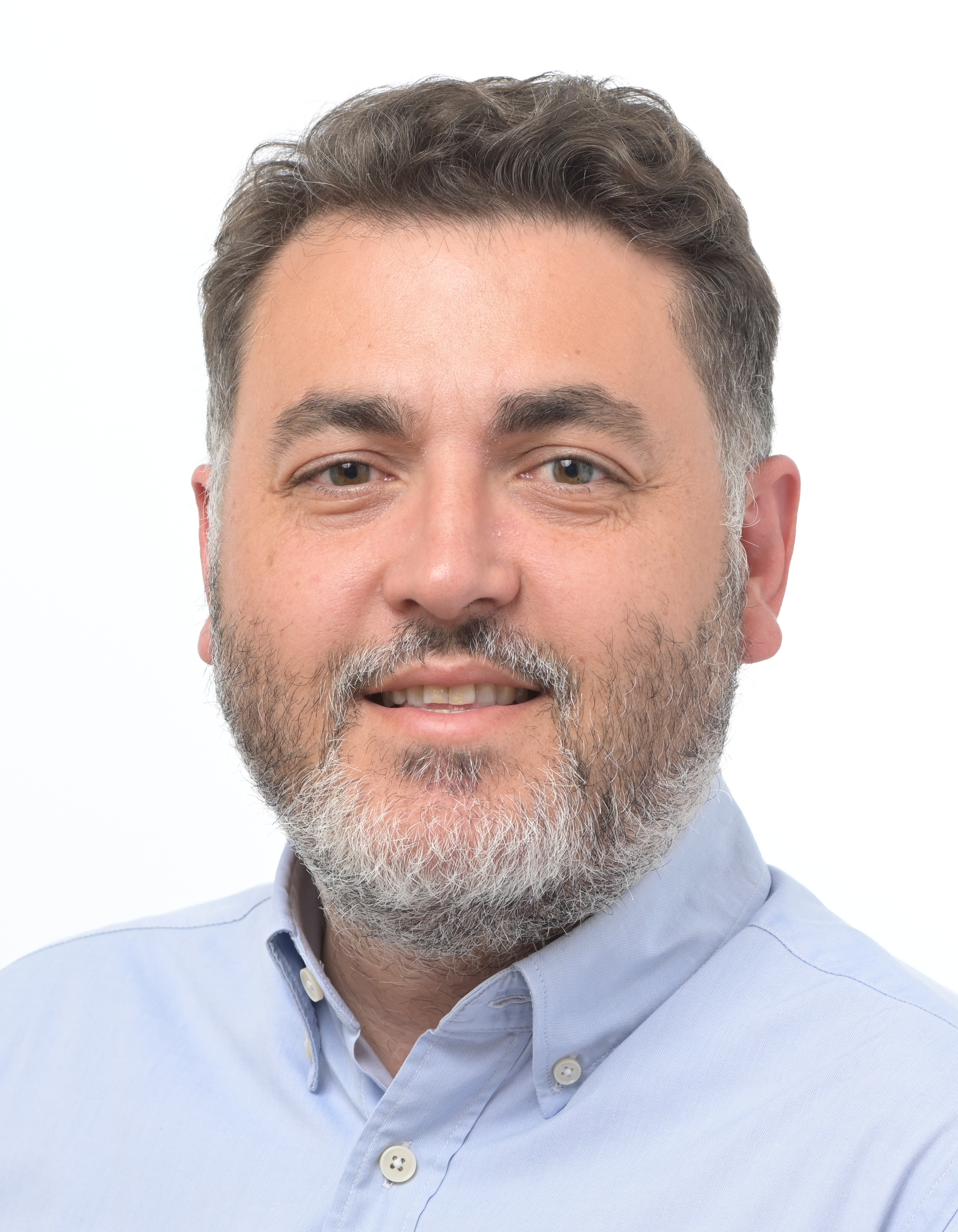

Member of the European Parliament
- Incumbent
- Assumed office 1 July 2014
- Constituency: Spain

Personal details
- Born: 8 January 1979 (age 47) Oviedo, Spain
- Party: Spanish Socialist Workers' Party
- Occupation: Politician, economist

Jonás Fernández Álvarez (pronounced [xoˈnas feɾˈnandeθ]; born 1979) is a Spanish economist and politician who has been serving as Member of the European Parliament since 2014.

== Early life and education ==
Born on 8 January 1979 in Oviedo, Fernández earned a licentiate degree in Economics at the University of Oviedo (1997–2001). He later obtained an M.A. in Economics and Finance from CEMFI-Bank of Spain (2002–2004) and an Executive MBA from IESE Business School (2010–2012).

== Career ==
Fernández was Secretary-General of the Socialist Youth of Oviedo.

Fernández worked for Madrid-based consulting firm Solchaga Recio & asociados (2005–2014) and lectured at the Charles III University of Madrid (2007–2010).

Fernández was included in the 14th position of the Spanish Socialist Workers' Party (PSOE) list for the 2014 European Parliament election in Spain, becoming a member of the European Parliament. He ran again for the 2019 European Parliament election in Spain, 16th in the PSOE list, retaining his seat.

As a member of the Progressive Alliance of Socialists and Democrats (S&D) political group, Fernández has since been serving on the Committee on Economic and Monetary Affairs (ECON). In 2020, he also joined the Subcommittee on Tax Matters. In addition to his committee assignments, he is part of the Spinelli Group and the European Parliament Intergroup on Trade Unions.

In July 2019, the S&D group in the European Parliament elected Fernández as the group's spokesperson (coordinator) in the ECON Committee. In this capacity, he is also the parliament's rapporteur on measures to ease capital and accounting burdens on banks to ensure a continued flow of loans to businesses struggling in the COVID-19 pandemic in 2020.

== Works ==
- — (2013). Una alternativa progresista. Barcelona: Ediciones Deusto.
