= The Left for the Right to Decide =

The Left for the Right to Decide L'Esquerra pel Dret a Decidir
- Leader: Josep Maria Terricabras
- Founded: 2014
- Dissolved: 2019
- Merger of: ERC; NECat; CatSí
- Preceded by: Europe of the Peoples–Greens
- Succeeded by: Ahora Repúblicas
- Ideology: Catalan independence Social democracy
- Colours: Orange

Website
- www.noupais.eu

The Left for the Right to Decide (Catalan: L'Esquerra pel Dret a Decidir, EPDD) was an electoral alliance formed for the 2014 European Parliament elections. The leading candidate was Josep Maria Terricabras.

The alliance consisted of three parties: Republican Left of Catalonia, New Catalan Left and Catalonia Yes. Also form the coalition: Socialisme, Catalunya i Llibertat and Young Republican Left of Catalonia. The program of the alliance promotes the independence of Catalonia and social justice.

== Composition ==
Party
Republican Left of Catalonia (ERC)
New Catalan Left (NECat)
Catalonia Yes (CatSí)

== List of candidates ==
1. Josep Maria Terricabras (ERC)
2. Ernest Maragall (Catalan New Left)
3. Jordi Solé (ERC)
4. Elisabet Nebreda (ERC)
5. Marie Krapetz (ERC)
6. Andreu Criquet (JERC)
7. Miquel Àngel Sureda (ER, federation of the Balearic Islands)
8. Gabriel Fernàndez (Socialisme, Catalunya i Llibertat)
9. Magda Casamitjana (Catalan New Left)
10. Eloïsa Chamarro (ERPV, federation of the Valencian Country)

== Electoral performance ==
=== European Parliament ===
European Parliament
Election	Vote	%	Score	Seats	+/–
2014	630,072	4.01%	7th	2 / 54	1
