= Left Movement =

Left Movement Moviment d'Esquerres de Catalunya
- Leader: Josep Serra i Marimon
- Founders: Marina Geli; Ernest Maragall
- Founded: 30 November 2014
- Merger of: New Catalan Left; Catalonia Movement
- Split from: Socialists' Party of Catalonia
- Headquarters: Barcelona
- Ideology: Social democracy Catalan independence
- Political position: Centre-left
- Regional affiliation: Junts pel Sí (2015–17); Republican Left of Catalonia–Catalonia Yes (2017–20); Together for Catalonia (2020–present)
- Congress of Deputies (Catalan seats): 0 / 48
- Senate (Catalan seats): 0 / 24
- European Parliament (Spanish seats): 1 / 61
- Parliament of Catalonia: 1 / 135

Website
- mesesquerres.cat

Left Movement of Catalonia (Catalan: Moviment d'Esquerres de Catalunya, MESCat) is a social-democratic, pro-independence political party in Catalonia. The party was founded in November 2014 from the merger of New Catalan Left (NECat) and Catalonia Movement (Moviment Catalunya), which had both been formed by dissident members of the Socialists' Party of Catalonia (PSC) who were dissatisfied with what they saw as the party's lack of support for the independence movement. Its founders included Marina Geli (Moviment Catalunya) and Ernest Maragall (NECat), but both have ever since left for other parties—Geli joined the Together for Catalonia alliance ahead of the 2017 Catalan regional election, whereas Maragall defected to Republican Left of Catalonia (ERC) in 2018.

== History ==
The party had its roots in the severe internal crisis affecting the Socialists' Party of Catalonia (PSC) following its defeat in the 2010 Catalan regional election and the rise in support for Catalan independence following the 11 September 2012 demonstration. On 15 December 2012, former regional minister and Pasqual Maragall's brother Ernest Maragall, who had left the PSC in October, announced his New Catalan Left (NECat) party, aiming to re-organize the Socialist space in Catalonia with Republican Left of Catalonia (ERC), Initiative for Catalonia Greens (ICV), the Popular Unity Candidacy (CUP) and dissidents from the PSC. In June 2014, the PSC's internal current Avancem, which had been established in May 2012 and was led by deputy in the Parliament of Catalonia Joan Ignasi Elena, split from its mother party and allied with NECat. In July 2014, Catalonia Movement (Moviment Catalunya), a party supported by PSC members Montserrat Tura, Marina Geli and Antoni Castells, among others, was established with the goal of fielding candidates in the 2015 Spanish local elections that supported Catalanism and pro-independence stances.

The three parties entered talks in August 2014 to discuss their merging into a new political party, with all three sharing their political action in the ensuing months, such as their presence in the 2014 "V" Catalan Way or their joint public response to the 2014 Catalan self-determination referendum. As merger discussions continued, Avancem dropped out on 12 November, citing political disagreements with Moviment despite a "total agreement" existing with NECat. An agreement between NECat and Moviment was reached on 20 November, and ten days later both parties would officialize their merger into the newly-established "Left Movement" (MES).

MES would run in the upcoming 24 May 2015 local elections, signing electoral alliances with ERC in 45 municipalities, with ICV in 4 and running on its own in a further 15. The party secured a total of 106 councillors, of which 37 came from the municipalities where it ran on its own and the remaining ones from its electoral agreements with ERC and ICV. On 26 June 2015, Magda Casamitjana was appointed as new MES president. Under her leadership, the party, which had considered joining the electoral coalition being negotiated by Podemos and ICV, ultimately brought itself into the Junts pel Sí pro-independence alliance with ERC and Democratic Convergence of Catalonia (CDC) ahead of the 2015 Catalan regional election. On 9 July 2016, Alfons Palacios replaced Casamitjana as party leader, and since 2017 it has been part of the Republican Left of Catalonia–Catalonia Yes alliance.

== Electoral performance ==
=== Parliament of Catalonia ===
Parliament of Catalonia
Election	Votes	%	#	Seats	+/–	Leading candidate	Status in legislature
2015	Within JxSí			1 / 135	1	Artur Mas	Confidence and supply
2017	Within ERC–CatSí			1 / 135	0	Oriol Junqueras (Note: At the time of the election, Junqueras was in preventive detention in Estremera (Madrid).)	Confidence and supply
2021	Within Junts			1 / 135	0	Laura Borràs	Coalition (2021–2022)
2021	Within Junts			1 / 135	0	Laura Borràs	Opposition (2022–2024)
2024	Within Junts			0 / 135	1	Carles Puigdemont	Opposition
