= Plural Left (Spain, 2014) =

Plural Left Izquierda Plural
- Abbreviation: IP
- Leader: Willy Meyer
- Founded: 2014
- Dissolved: 2019
- Merger of: IU; ICV–EUiA; AGE; EVPV; GM–LV; CLI–AS; I–E; EKI–Iratzarri
- Preceded by: The Left
- Ideology: Socialism; Anti-capitalism; Feminism; Environmentalism
- European affiliation: European United Left–Nordic Green Left; The Greens–European Free Alliance
- European Parliament (Spanish seats): 6 / 54

Plural Left (Spanish: La Izquierda Plural, IP) was a Spanish electoral coalition in the 2014 European Parliament election made up from both national and regional left-wing parties.

== History ==
Its list obtained 10.03% and 1.575.308 votes, achieving 6 seats distributed as follows:

- 4 seats to United Left, joined European United Left–Nordic Green Left.
  - Willy Meyer, resigned as of 25 June 2014
  - Paloma López Bermejo
  - Marina Albiol Guzmán
  - Ángela Rosa Vallina de la Noval
  - Javier Couso Permuy, takes Meyer's seat.
- 1 seat to Anova-Nationalist Brotherhood, joined European United Left–Nordic Green Left.
  - Maria Lidia Senra Rodríguez
- 1 seat to Initiative for Catalonia Greens, joined The Greens–European Free Alliance
  - Ernest Urtasun Domenech

== Composition ==
| Party | Scope |
|---|---|
| United Left (IU) | — |
| Initiative for Catalonia Greens–United and Alternative Left (ICV–EUiA) | Catalonia |
| Galician Left Alternative (AGE) | Galicia |
| The Greens of the Valencian Country (EVPV) | Valencian Community |
| Tour Madrid–The Greens (GM–LV) | Madrid |
| Building the Left–Socialist Alternative (CLI–AS) | — |
| Left (I–E) | Navarre |
| Left Initiative–Awake (EKI–Iratzarri) | Basque Country |

== Electoral performance ==
=== European Parliament ===
European Parliament
| Election | Seats | Vote | % |
| 2014 | 6 / 54 | 1,575,308 (#3) | 10.03 |
