= Coalition for Europe =

Coalition for Europe was the name adopted by various electoral coalitions formed in Spain for elections to the European Parliament. The coalitions were headed by Convergence and Union and Basque Nationalist Party:

- Coalition for Europe (2009), in the 2009 election
- Coalition for Europe (2014), in the 2014 election
