= Lola Sánchez Caldentey =

Spanish politician

Lola Sánchez Caldentey MEP
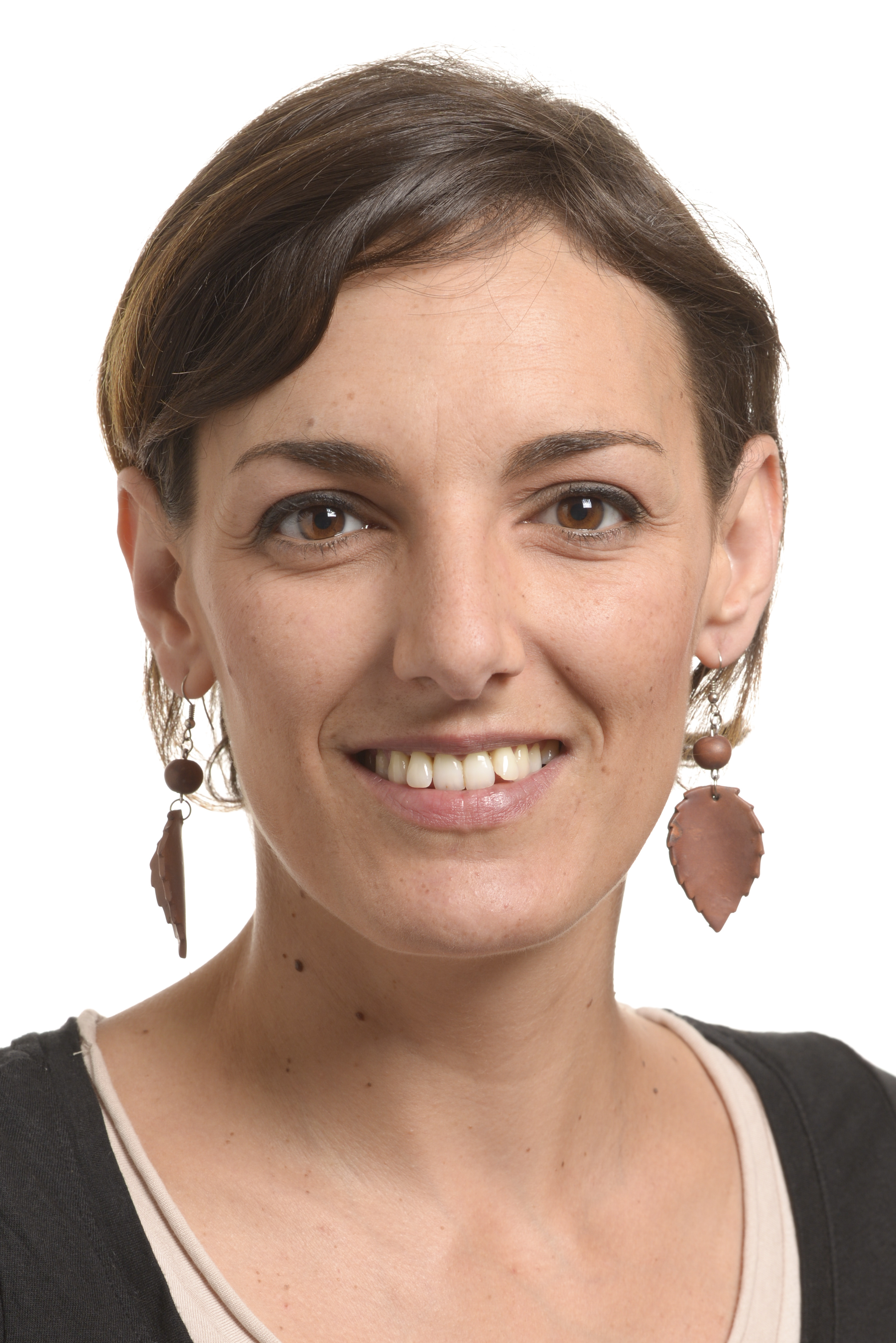

Member of the European Parliament
- In office 1 July 2014 – 18 April 2019
- Succeeded by: Idoia Villanueva
- Constituency: Spain

Personal details
- Born: 17 March 1978 (age 48) Valencia, Valencian Community, Spain
- Party: Podemos (Spain); GUE/NGL (Europe)
- Education: University of Murcia; University of La Rioja; UNED; University of Granada

María Dolores "Lola" Sánchez Caldentey (17 March 1978) is a Spanish politician, and a former Member of the European Parliament, one of the five MEPs elected by Podemos in the 2014 European Parliament election.
