= Isabel Carrasco =

Spanish politician of the People's Party (1955–2014)

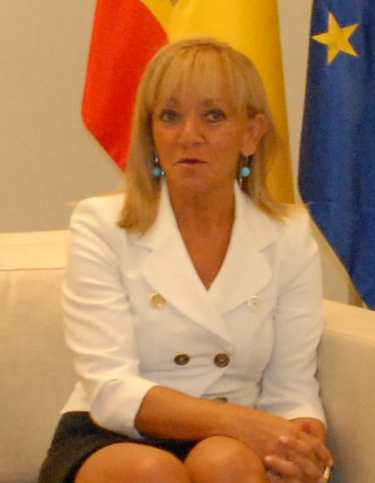
- Carrasco in a meeting with Prime Minister in 2011

Member of the Senate of Spain
- In office 2003–2007

Personal details
- Born: Isabel Carrasco Lorenzo; 4 March 1955
- Died: 12 May 2014 (aged 59) León, Spain
- Party: People's Party

Isabel Carrasco Lorenzo (4 March 1955 – 12 May 2014) was a Spanish politician of the People's Party. Carrasco served in the Senate of Spain between 2003 and 2007. At the time of her death, Carrasco was the head of the government in the northwestern Province of León, and the head of the People's Party in the province. She was murdered in May 2014 as she walked from her home to a political party meeting.

== Assassination ==
Carrasco was shot as she crossed a bridge over the Bernesga in León. Mariano Rajoy, the Prime Minister of Spain and the head of the People's Party, cancelled engagements in the wake of her death. A mother and daughter were later arrested in conjunction with Carrasco's death. The daughter had recently been fired from the council, the mother testifying in the court trial that her daughter was let go from her job because she refused to have sex with Carrasco. The women were the wife and daughter of a police chief in the province of León. On 20 February 2016, Montserrat González, her daughter Triana Martínez and local police officer Raquel Gago, a friend of Martínez, were found guilty of planning and carrying out the murder of Carrasco.
