= Willy Meyer Pleite =

Spanish politician (born 1952)

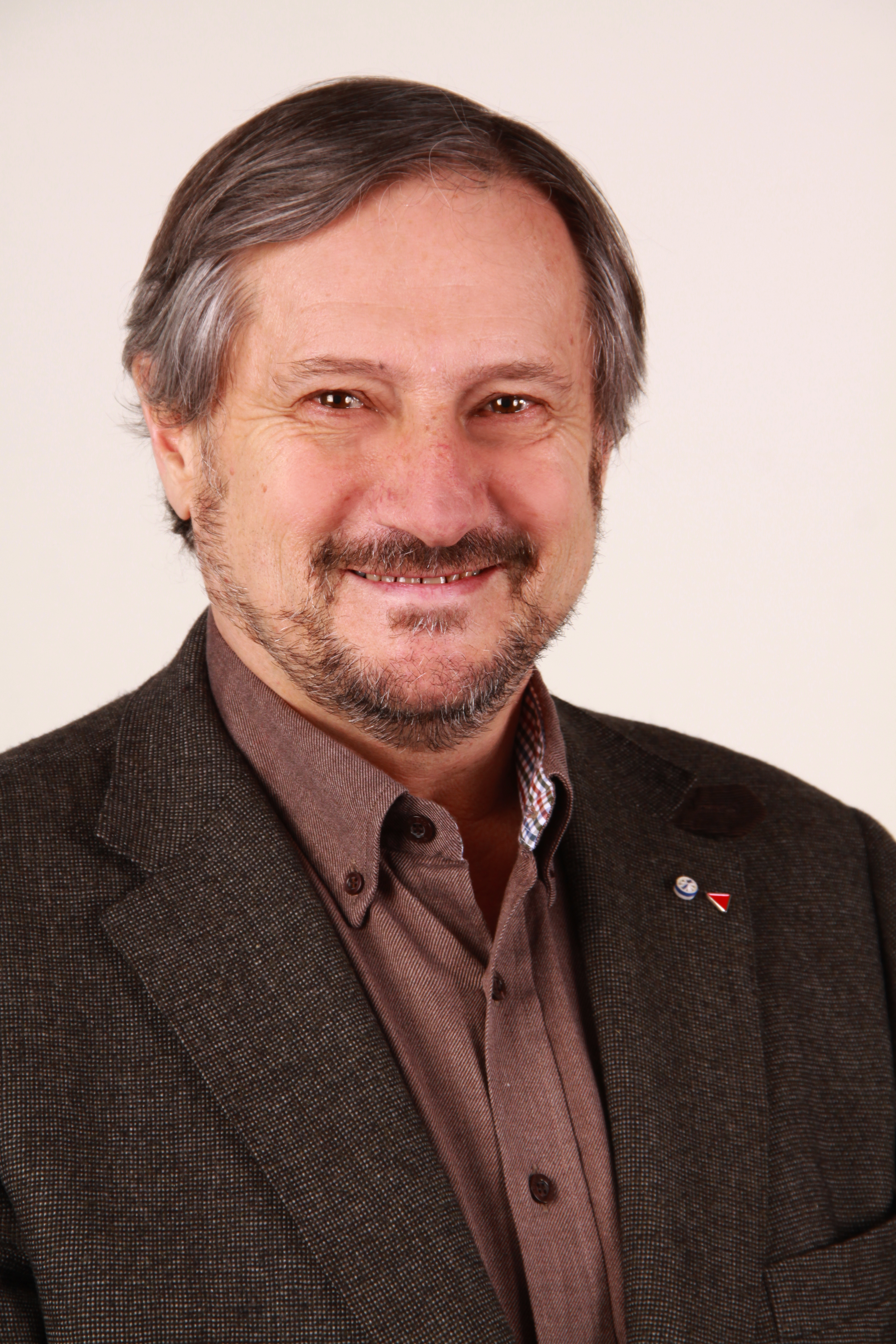
Willy Meyer (2014).

Willy Enrique Meyer Pleite (born 19 August 1952, in Madrid) is a Spanish politician who was Member of the European Parliament with the Izquierda Unida (United Left) from 2004 to 2014. He was a member of the bureau of the European United Left–Nordic Green Left, and sat on the European Parliament's Committee on Fisheries, Committee on Foreign Affairs, and the Committee on Petitions. He was a substitute for the Committee on Development.

Meyer Pleite was born in Madrid. He is a member of the Communist Party of Spain (PCE) since 1970.

His name caught the attention of the media after the resignation of his sit as Member of the European Parliament due to the discovery of a controversial SICAV under the ownership of the communist parliamentary in 2014.

== Decorations ==
- Knight Grand Cross of the Aeronautical Order of Merit [with white distinctive] (Kingdom of Spain, 23 December 1999).

== See also ==
- 2004 European Parliament election in Spain
