= Josep Maria Terricabras i Nogueras =

Catalan philosopher and politician (1946–2024)

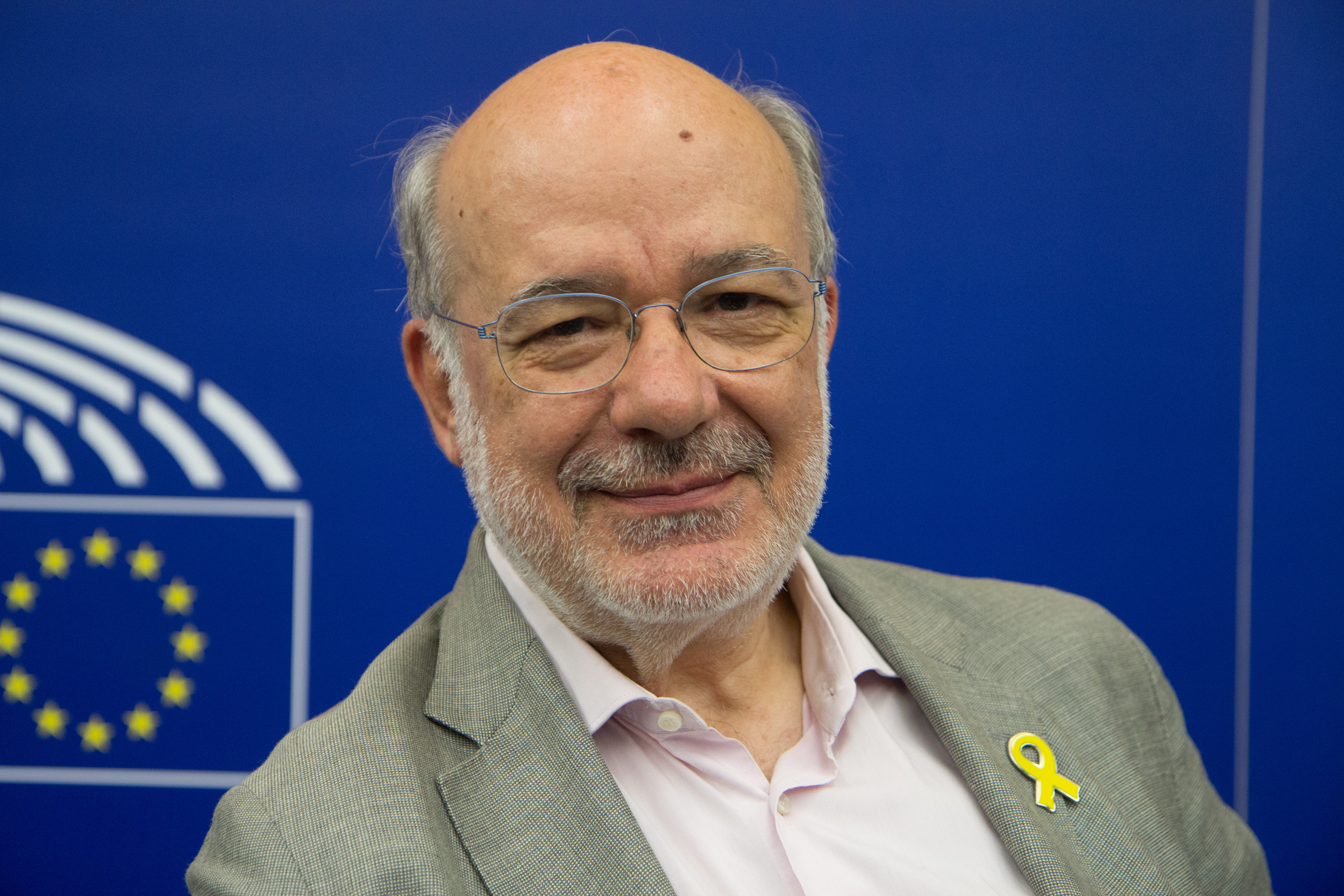
Terricabras in 2018

Josep Maria Terricabras i Nogueras (12 July 1946 – 16 April 2024) was a Spanish philosopher, academic and politician. He was elected Member of the European Parliament (MEP) for Republican Left of Catalonia in the 2014 European Parliament election. Terricabras was born in Calella on 12 July 1946, and died on 16 April 2024, at the age of 77.
