= Spain (European Parliament constituency) =

Constituency of the European Parliament

- European Parliament constituency
- Location among the current constituencies
- Member state: Spain
- Created: 1987
- MEPs: 60 (1986–1993); 64 (1993–2004); 54 (2004–2009); 50 (2009–2011); 54 (2011–2020); 59 (2020–2024); 61 (2024–present)

Spain is a European Parliament constituency for elections in the European Union covering the member state of Spain. It is currently represented by 61 Members of the European Parliament and is the second largest European Parliament constituency in terms of geographic area after France, as well as the third most populated after Germany and France.

== Electoral system ==
The constituency was created as per the 1985 Treaty of Accession and was first contested in the 1987 European election in Spain. The Treaty provided for Spain to be allocated 60 representatives within the European Parliament, but successive amendments to the Treaty on European Union and the Treaties establishing the European Communities have seen this number change: 64 under Council Decision 93/81/Euratom, ECSC, EEC and Amsterdam; 50 under Nice and 54 under Lisbon. The European Parliament Committee on Constitutional Affairs proposed on 23 January 2018 an increase of the number of seats allocated to Spain from 54 to 59 after Brexit has taken place, a proposal that first needs to be adopted by the Parliament, then approved by the European Council, to be made effective.

Voting is on the basis of universal suffrage, which comprises all nationals and non-national European citizens over eighteen and in full enjoyment of their political rights. Amendments to the electoral law in 2011 required for Spaniards abroad to apply for voting before being permitted to vote, a system known as "begged" or expat vote (Spanish: Voto rogado) which was abolished in 2022. Seats are elected using the D'Hondt method and a closed list proportional representation, with no electoral threshold being applied in order to be entitled to enter seat distribution. However, the use of the D'Hondt method may result in an effective threshold depending on the district magnitude.

The electoral law provides that parties, federations, coalitions and groupings of electors are allowed to present lists of candidates. However, they are required to secure the signature of at least 15,000 registered electors. Electors are barred from signing for more than one list of candidates. Parties, federations and coalitions are allowed to replace this requirement with the signature of at least 50 elected officials—deputies, senators, MEPs or members from the legislative assemblies of autonomous communities or from local city councils—. Concurrently, parties and federations intending to enter in coalition to take part jointly at an election are required to inform the relevant Electoral Commission within ten days of the election being called.

== Members of the European Parliament ==
Members of the European Parliament for Spain 1987–present
Key to parties HB EH LPD AR BNG IU/IP UP Podemos Podemos SMR PE IdP EPDD EP PA PSOE CN–EP CN CE Galeusca CEUS CEU JuntsxCat Junts Cs CDS CiU PP AP Ruiz-Mateos Vox SALF
Parliament	Election	Distribution
2nd	1987	1 / 3 / 1 / 28 / 7 / 3 / 17
3rd	1989	1 / 4 / 1 / 1 / 1 / 27 / 1 / 5 / 2 / 15 / 2
4th	1994	9 / 22 / 2 / 3 / 28
5th	1999	1 / 1 / 4 / 24 / 2 / 2 / 3 / 27
6th	2004	2 / 1 / 25 / 2 / 24
7th	2009	2 / 1 / 21 / 1 / 2 / 23
7th	2011 (Note: Once the Treaty of Lisbon came into force on 1 December 2011, Spain's MEP delegation was increased from 50 to 54 and applied retroactively.)	2 / 1 / 23 / 1 / 3 / 24
8th	2014	1 / 6 / 5 / 1 / 2 / 14 / 4 / 2 / 3 / 16
9th	2019	3 / 6 / 20 / 1 / 2 / 7 / 12 / 3
9th	2020 (Note: As a result of Brexit, Spain's MEP delegation grew to 59, with the additional 5 seats being allocated to PSOE (1), PP (1), Cs (1), Vox (1) and Junts (1).)	3 / 6 / 21 / 1 / 3 / 8 / 13 / 4
10th	2024	3 / 2 / 3 / 20 / 1 / 1 / 22 / 6 / 3

== Elections ==
=== 1987 ===
The 1987 election was the first European election for Spain.

=== 1989 ===
The 1989 European election was the third election to the European Parliament and the second for Spain.

=== 1994 ===
The 1994 European election was the fourth election to the European Parliament and the third for Spain.

=== 1999 ===
The 1999 European election was the fifth election to the European Parliament and the fourth for Spain.

=== 2004 ===
The 2004 European election was the sixth election to the European Parliament and the fifth for Spain.

=== 2009 ===
The 2009 European election was the seventh election to the European Parliament and the sixth for Spain.

=== 2014 ===
The 2014 European election was the eighth election to the European Parliament and the seventh for Spain.

=== 2019 ===
The 2019 European election was the ninth election to the European Parliament and the eighth for Spain.

=== 2024 ===
The 2024 European election was the tenth election to the European Parliament and the ninth for Spain. In total 61 Members of the European Parliament were elected.
