= Jesús Eguiguren =

Spanish politician

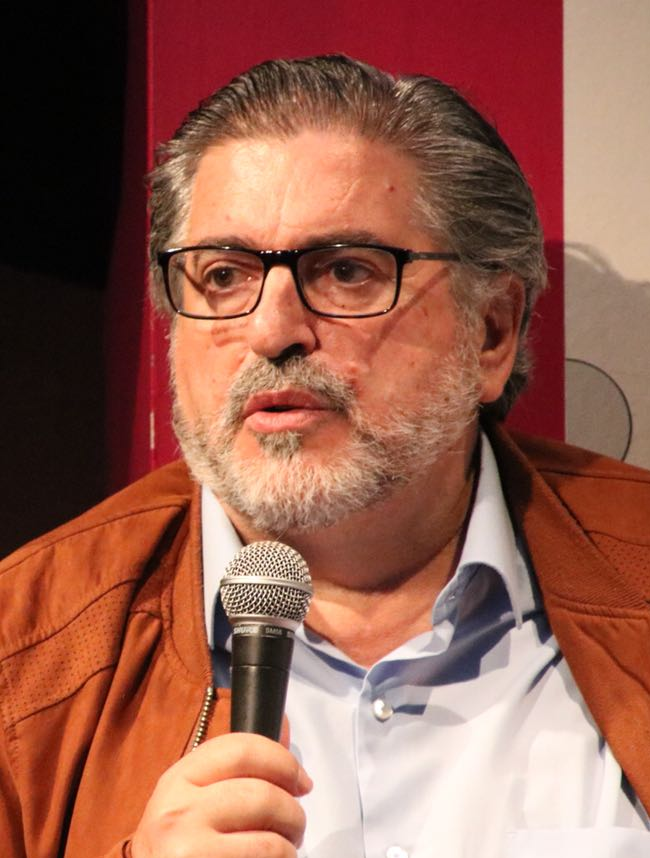

2nd President of the Basque Parliament
- In office 8 January 1987 – 18 December 1990
- Preceded by: Juan José Pujana
- Succeeded by: Joseba Leizaola

Member of the Basque Parliament
- In office 23 January 1983 – 19 November 2012

Personal details
- Born: Jesús María Eguiguren Imaz; 2 June 1954 (age 71) Aizarnazabal, Gipuzkoa, Spain
- Party: PSE-EE
- Spouse: Rafaela Romero

Jesús María Eguiguren Imaz (born 2 June 1954, Aizarnazabal, Gipuzkoa) is a Spanish academic, jurist, politician, and member of the Socialist Party of the Basque Country–Basque Country Left (PSE-EE). Eguiguren served as a member of the Basque Parliament from 1983 to 2012, including a tenure as the second President of the Basque Parliament from 8 January 1987 until 18 December 1990. He later became the President of the PSE-EE-PSOE political party from 2002 to 2014.

== Life ==
He studied Law at the University of the Basque Country. In the 2000s, Eguiguren represented the government during peace talks with ETA.

Eguiguren was born in Aizarnazabal, Gipuzkoa, in 1954. He is married to Rafaela Romero, a lawyer and member of the Basque Parliament.
