= Barandica =

Barandica is a surname. Notable people with the surname include:

- Izaskun Bilbao Barandica (born 1961), Spanish politician
- Rosa Navarro Barandica (born 1955), Colombian photographer and mixed-media artist
