= José Manuel Urtain =

Basque boxer, woodchopper and stone lifter

Urtain
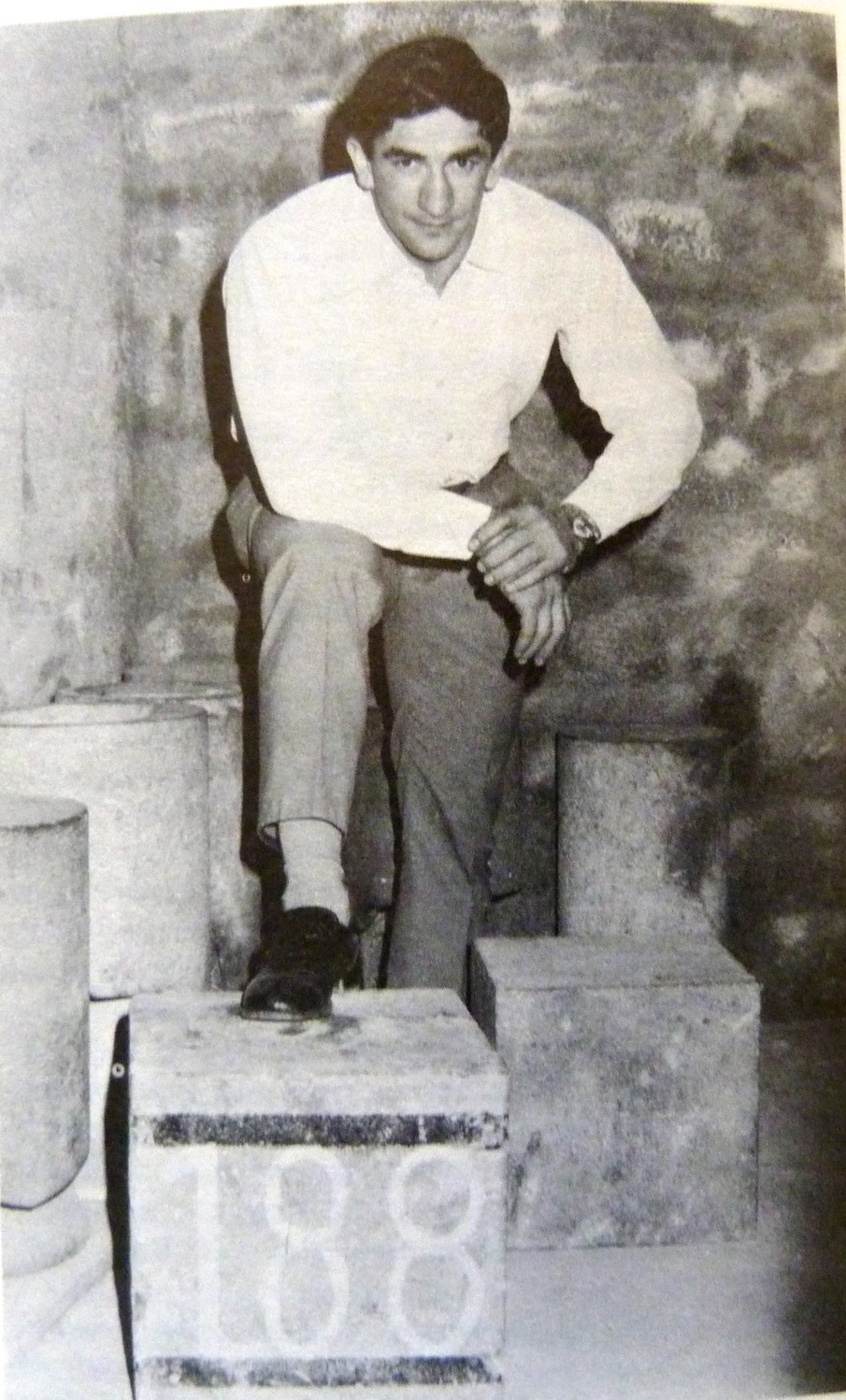
- Born: José Manuel Ibar Azpiazu; 14 May 1943; Aizarnazabal, Spain
- Died: 21 July 1992 (aged 49); Madrid, Spain
- Occupations: Strongman, boxer
- Spouse: Cecilia Urbieta (m. 1963; div. 1975) Maria Luisa García (m. 1975)
- Children: 5
- Boxing career
- Nicknames: The Tiger of Zestoa; The Morrosko
- Height: 1.80 m (5 ft 11 in)
- Weight: Heavyweight

Boxing record
- Total fights: 68
- Wins: 53
- Win by KO: 41
- Losses: 11
- Draws: 4

}}

José Manuel Ibar Azpiazu (14 May 1943 – 21 July 1992), known by the nickname Urtain, was a Basque Spanish strongman and proferssional boxer, who became the EBU heavyweight champion in 1970 and 1971.

== Biography ==
Born in Aizarnazabal, he was nicknamed Urtain as it was the name of the farmhouse where he spent his childhood in Zestoa. When he was young he started practising Basque rural sports, known as Herri Kirolak, specially aizkolaritza (wood-chopping) and harri-jasotze (stone lifting) before becoming a professional boxer.

He started boxing in Ordizia in 1968 and he won 27 fights in a row by knock-out. In 1970, he became the EBU heavyweight champion in Madrid after defeating the German Peter Weiland in the seventh round.

He then lost his crown on 10 November 1970 at Wembley Stadium in London against Britain's Henry Cooper. The next year in 1971 he recovered the European EBU champion crown against Jack Bodell, but lost it again in 1972 against Jurgen Blin.

He tried to recover the title again in 1977 in Antwerp against Jean Pierre Coopman but he could not defeat the Belgian boxer.

After retirement Urtain suffered from alcoholism and debts, resulting in the breakdown of his marriage. He committed suicide by jumping from the 10th floor of his home in Madrid.

During his period as a boxer (1968–1977) he took part in 68 fights, of which we won 53 (41 by knock-out), lost 11 and 4 draws.

== Filmography ==
- Urtain, el rey de la selva... o así (1969)
