= Bakartxo Tejeria =

Spanish politician

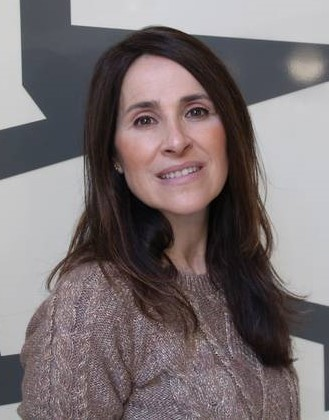
- Tejeria in 2017

President of the Basque Parliament
- Incumbent
- Assumed office 20 November 2012
- Preceded by: Arantza Quiroga

Member of the Basque Parliament
- Incumbent
- Assumed office 12 June 2001
- Constituency: Gipuzkoa

Mayor of Villabona
- In office 14 June 2003 – 16 June 2007
- Preceded by: Maixabel Arrieta
- Succeeded by: Maixabel Arrieta

Member of the Villabona City Council
- In office 4 July 1999 – 11 June 2011

Personal details
- Born: Bakartxo Tejeria Otermin; 28 March 1971 (age 55) San Sebastián, Basque Country, Spain
- Party: Basque National Party
- Spouse: Joanes Labaien (m. 2001)
- Children: 4
- Education: University of the Basque Country
- Occupation: Lawyer • Politician

Bakartxo Tejeria Otermin (born 28 March 1971) is a Basque politician serving as speaker or President of the Basque Parliament since 2012. She is the third woman to hold the position, as well as the longest serving speaker. Tejeria has been a Member of the Basque Parliament for Gipuzkoa since 2001. She is affiliated with the Basque National Party.

== Life and career ==
Bakartxo Tejeria Otermin was born in San Sebastian (Gipuzkoa) and spent a brief time in Larraul but moved while still a child to Villabona (Gipuzkoa).

A law graduate of the University of the Basque Country, Tejeria worked as a solicitor in Tolosa. She also worked as justice of the peace in Villabona from 1997 to 1999. She joined the Basque National Party in the 1990s, and was elected town councillor for Villabona in the 1999 election. She led her party to victory in the 2003 election, and served as mayor of Villabona from 2003 to 2007. She failed to secure a majority after the 2007 election, and continued as a councillor from the opposition until 2011.

Tejeria became a prominent member of the Basque National Party in the Basque Parliament upon being elected in the 2001 election. As a member of the Women and Youth parliamentary committee, she was one of the promotors of the 2005 Equality Law. She was re-elected in the 2005 election. She became a high-ranking member of her party in 2008, as a member of the party's Executive Branch of Gipuzkoa (GBB). After the 2009 election, which sent the Basque National Party to the opposition, she was tasked with coordinating the party's parliamentary group in the Basque Parliament.

The Basque National Party chose Tejeria as the party's candidate for the presidency of the Basque parliament before the 2012 election. After her party's victory, she was elected as the seventh speaker (President) of the Basque Parliament on 20 November 2012. She was re-elected after the 2016 election and the 2020 election, which made Tejeria the first speaker to serve for three terms. She was re-elected after the 2024 election to serve for a fourth term. Tejeria is also the longest serving member of parliament during the current parliamentary term.

Tejeria belongs to the social democrat and the pro-independence section of her party. She supports a new constitutional arrangement for the Basque Country and has participated in demonstrations defending the Basque Country's right to choose its own future. She has also opposed the incarceration of pro-independence Catalan politicians amid the 2017 constitutional crisis.

== Personal life ==
Tejeria is married to Joanes Labaien, a former state attorney who is the son of the late Ramon Labaien, Minister of Culture of the Basque Government and mayor of San Sebastian in the 1980s. The couple has two daughters (born in 2005 and 2009) and two sons (twins, born in 2016). They live in San Sebastian.
