= 2019 European Parliament election in Spain =

- 26 May 2019

All 59 (Note: Note that, once Brexit came into effect on 31 January 2020, Spain's MEP delegation was increased from 54 to 59 and applied retroactively.) Spanish seats in the European Parliament
- Opinion polls
- Registered: 37,248,888 ▲2.0%
- Turnout: 22,619,984 (60.7%) ▲16.9 pp
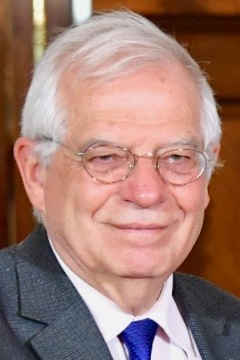

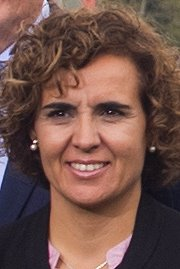

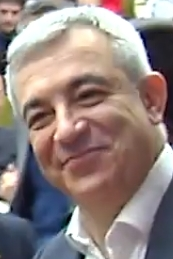

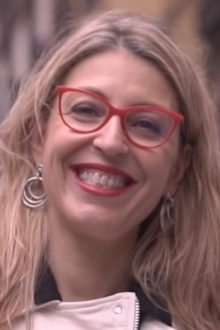

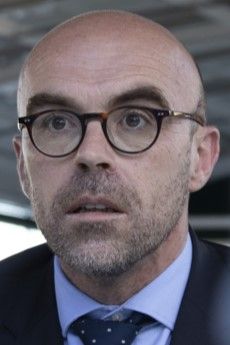

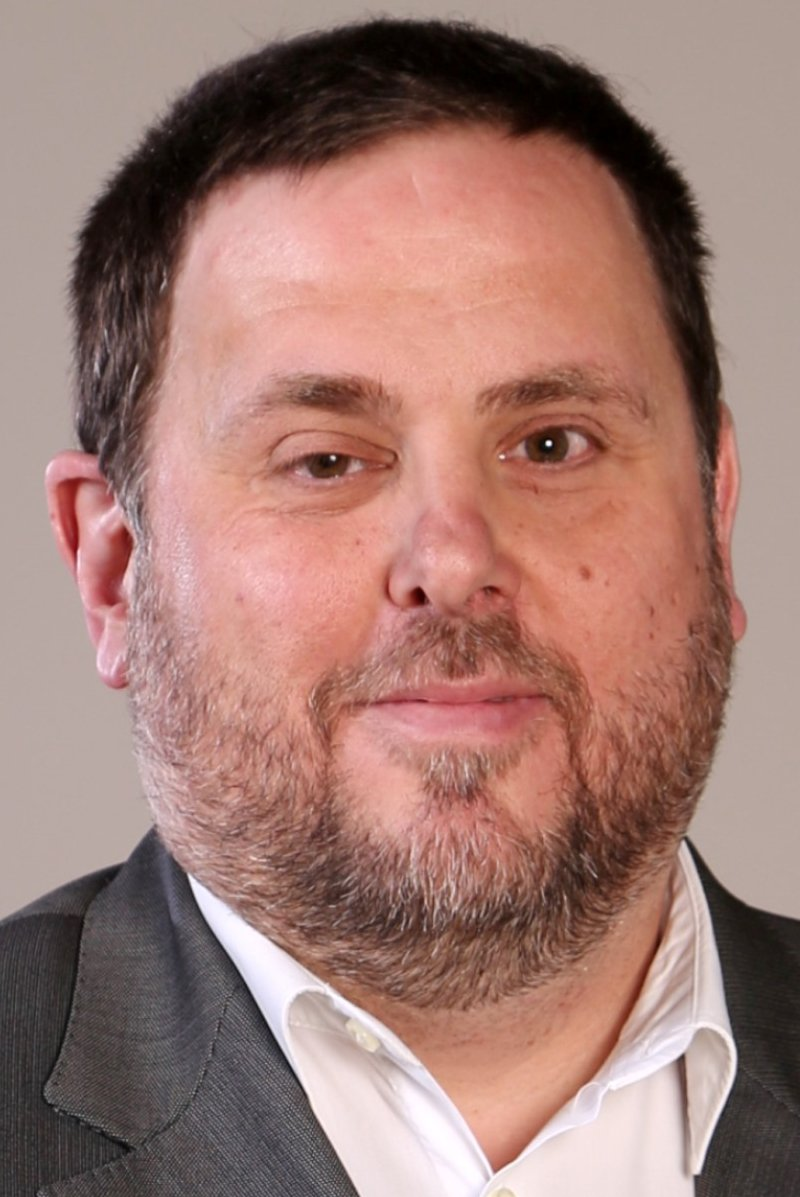
	First party	Second party	Third party
Leader	Josep Borrell	Dolors Montserrat	Luis Garicano
Party	PSOE	PP	Cs
Alliance	S&D	EPP	ALDE (RE)
Leader since	26 February 2019	1 April 2019	29 December 2018
Last election	14 seats, 23.0%	16 seats, 26.1%	6 seats, 9.7% (Note: Results for UPyD (6.5%, 4 seats) and C's (3.2%, 2 seats) in the 2014 election.)
Seats won	21	13	8
Seat change	▲7	▼3	▲2
Popular vote	7,369,789	4,519,205	2,731,825
Percentage	32.9%	20.2%	12.2%
Swing	▲9.9 pp	▼5.9 pp	▲2.5 pp
	Fourth party	Fifth party	Sixth party
Leader	María Eugenia Rodríguez Palop	Jorge Buxadé	Oriol Junqueras (Note: At the time in preventive detention in Soto del Real (Madrid).)
Party	Podemos–IU	Vox	Ahora Repúblicas
Alliance	GUE/NGL; Greens/EFA	ECR	Greens/EFA; GUE/NGL
Leader since	21 March 2019	21 April 2019	29 September 2018
Last election	11 seats, 18.0% (Note: Results for IP (10.0%, 6 seats) and Podemos (8.0%, 5 seats) in the 2014 election.)	0 seats, 1.6%	3 seats, 6.1% (Note: Results for EPDD (4.0%, 2 seats) and LPD (2.1%, 1 seat) in the 2014 election.)
Seats won	6	4	3
Seat change	▼5	▲4	0
Popular vote	2,258,857	1,393,684	1,252,139
Percentage	10.1%	6.2%	5.6%
Swing	▼7.9 pp	▲4.6 pp	▼0.5 pp

An election was held in Spain on 26 May 2019 as part of the concurrent EU-wide election to the 9th European Parliament. All 54 seats allocated to the Spanish constituency as per the Treaty of Lisbon—59 after Brexit was formalized on 31 January 2020—were up for election. It was held concurrently with regional elections in twelve autonomous communities and local elections all across Spain.

Held one month after the 28 April 2019 general election, the Spanish Socialist Workers' Party (PSOE) of Prime Minister Pedro Sánchez scored a landslide victory—as well as the first win for the party in a European Parliament election in 15 years, also with Josep Borrell as its main candidate—by achieving 32.9% of the share and 20 seats, a result which allowed it to become the largest national delegation within the Progressive Alliance of Socialists and Democrats. Concurrently, the opposition People's Party (PP) suffered a severe setback and scored its worst result ever in a European Parliament election, but slightly improved on its general election results by achieving 20.2% of the vote and 12 seats. Citizens (Cs), which had integrated Union, Progress and Democracy (UPyD) within its lists ahead of the election, became the third most-voted party of the country, but at 12.2% and 7 seats it only slightly improved on the combined Cs–UPyD results in 2014. Unidas Podemos Cambiar Europa (English: "United We Can Change Europe"), the alliance of Podemos and United Left (IU) suffered a considerable drop from both parties' past results, being reduced to 10.1% and 6 seats. Far-right Vox performed well below expectations after disappointing results for the party in the 2019 general election, scoring 6.2% of the share and 3 seats.

Afterwards, and as a result of the United Kingdom's withdrawal from the European Union coming into effect on 31 January 2020, five additional seats were allocated to Spain's MEP delegation, which were re-distributed by granting one each to PSOE, PP, Cs, Vox and Junts according to their May 2019 election results.

== Overview ==
=== Electoral system ===
Voting for the European Parliament in Spain was based on universal suffrage, which comprised all Spanish nationals and resident non-national European citizens over 18 years of age with full political rights, provided that they had not been deprived of the right to vote by a final sentence. (Note: Amendments in 2018 granted the right to vote to those legally incapacitated.) Additionally, non-resident citizens were required to apply for voting, a system known as "begged" voting (Spanish: Voto rogado).

54 European Parliament seats were allocated to Spain as per the Treaty of Lisbon. All were elected in a single multi-member constituency—comprising the entire national territory—using the D'Hondt method and closed-list proportional voting, with no electoral threshold. The use of this electoral method resulted in an effective threshold depending on district magnitude and vote distribution.

The law did not provide for by-elections to fill vacant seats; instead, any vacancies arising after the proclamation of candidates and during the legislative term were filled by the next candidates on the party lists or, when required, by designated substitutes.

=== Outgoing delegation ===
The table below shows the composition of the Spanish delegation in the chamber at the time of the election call.

Delegation composition in April 2019
Groups	Parties	MEPs	
Groups	Parties	Seats	Total
European People's Party	PP	16	17
European People's Party	INDEP	1 (Note: Francesc Gambús, former UDC MEP.)	17
Progressive Alliance of Socialists and Democrats	PSOE	14	14
European United Left–Nordic Green Left	Podemos	5	10
European United Left–Nordic Green Left	IU	4	10
European United Left–Nordic Green Left	Anova	1	10
Alliance of Liberals and Democrats for Europe	Cs	4	8
Alliance of Liberals and Democrats for Europe	UPyD	1	8
Alliance of Liberals and Democrats for Europe	PDeCAT	1	8
Alliance of Liberals and Democrats for Europe	EAJ/PNV	1	8
Alliance of Liberals and Democrats for Europe	INDEP	1 (Note: Beatriz Becerra, former UPyD MEP.)	8
Greens–European Free Alliance	ERC	2	5
Greens–European Free Alliance	ICV	1	5
Greens–European Free Alliance	BNG	1	5
Greens–European Free Alliance	Equo	1	5

== Parties and candidates ==
The electoral law allowed for parties and federations registered in the interior ministry, alliances and groupings of electors to present lists of candidates. Parties and federations intending to form an alliance were required to inform the relevant electoral commission within 10 days of the election call. In order to be entitled to run, parties, federations, alliances and groupings of electors needed to secure the signature of at least 15,000 registered electors; this requirement could be lifted and replaced through the signature of at least 50 elected officials—deputies, senators, MEPs or members from the legislative assemblies of autonomous communities or from local city councils. Electors and elected officials were disallowed from signing for more than one list. Additionally, a balanced composition of men and women was required in the electoral lists, so that candidates of either sex made up at least 40 percent of the total composition.

Below is a list of the main parties and alliances which contested the election:

Candidacy	Parties and alliances	Leading candidate	Ideology	Previous result		Ref.
Candidacy	Parties and alliances	Leading candidate	Ideology	Vote %	Seats	Ref.
PP	List: People's Party (PP)	Dolors Montserrat	Conservatism; Christian democracy	26.1%	16	
PSOE	List: Spanish Socialist Workers' Party (PSOE); Socialists' Party of Catalonia (PSC)	Josep Borrell	Social democracy	23.0%	14	
Podemos–IU	List: Podemos (Podemos); United Left (IU) – Communist Party of Spain (PCE) – The Dawn Marxist Organization (La Aurora (OM)) – Republican Left (IR) – Feminist Party of Spain (PFE) – Unitarian Candidacy of Workers (CUT); Catalonia in Common (CatComú); Barcelona in Common (BComú)	María Eugenia Rodríguez Palop	Left-wing populism Democratic socialism	18.0%	11	
Cs	List: Citizens–Party of the Citizenry (Cs); Union, Progress and Democracy (UPyD)	Luis Garicano	Liberalism	9.7%	6	
Ahora; Repúblicas	List: Republican Left of Catalonia (ERC); Basque Country Gather (EH Bildu); Galician Nationalist Bloc (BNG); Andecha Astur (AA); Puyalón de Cuchas (Puyalón); Canarian Nationalist Alternative (ANC); National Congress of the Canaries (CNC); Unity of the People (UP)	Oriol Junqueras	Secessionism; Left-wing nationalism	6.1%	3	
Junts	List: Catalan European Democratic Party (PDeCAT); Democratic Convergence of Catalonia (CDC) (Note: CDC was registered as an independent member within the alliance in order to allow its successor party, the PDeCAT, to be guaranteed CDC's public funding and electoral rights for the campaign.); Together for Catalonia (JxCat) – National Call for the Republic (CNxR)	Carles Puigdemont	Catalan independence Liberalism	5.4% (Note: Results for CEU in the 2014 election.)	3	
CEUS	List: Basque Nationalist Party (EAJ/PNV); Canarian Coalition–Canarian Nationalist Party (CCa–PNC); Commitment to Galicia (CxG); Proposal for the Isles (El Pi); Valencian Democrats (DV); Yes to Navarre (GBai)	Izaskun Bilbao	Peripheral nationalism	5.4%	3	
CpE	List: Commitment Coalition (Compromís); More for Majorca (Més); It is Time (En Marea); Aragonese Union (CHA); New Canaries (NCa); Castilian Party (PCAS); Caballas Coalition (Caballas); Coalition for Melilla (CpM); Andalusian People's Initiative (iniciativa); Andalusian Left (IzA); The Greens of Europe (LVdeE)	Jordi Sebastià	Left-wing nationalism Eco-socialism	1.9% (Note: Results for PE in the 2014 election.)	1	
Vox	List: Vox (Vox)	Jorge Buxadé	Right-wing populism Ultranationalism; National conservatism	1.6%	0	

== Campaign ==
=== Party slogans ===
Party or alliance	Original slogan	English translation	Ref.
PP	« Centrados en tu futuro »	"Centered on your future"	
PSOE	« Siempre hacia delante »	"Always forward"	
Podemos–IU	« Verdades en Europa »	"Truths in Europe"	
Cs	« Vamos Europa »	"Let's go Europe"	
Ahora Repúblicas	« Impuls republicà »	"Republican impulse"	
Vox	« En Europa, por España »	"In Europe, for Spain"	

=== Debates ===
2019 European Parliament election debates in Spain
Date	Organizer(s)	Moderator(s)	P Present (Note: Denotes a main invitee attending the event.) S Surrogate (Note: Denotes a main invitee not attending the event, sending a surrogate in their place.) NI Not invited I Invited A Absent invitee										
Date	Organizer(s)	Moderator(s)	PP	PSOE	UPCE	Cs	AR	Junts	CEUS	CpE	Vox	Audience	Refs
12 May	laSexta (El Objetivo)	Ana Pastor	P Montserrat	P Borrell	P Palop	P Garicano	NI	NI	NI	NI	P Buxadé	6.9% (1,147,000)	
22 May	RTVE	Xabier Fortes	P Montserrat	P Borrell	P Palop	P Garicano	S Solé	S Knörr	P Bilbao	P Sebastià	P Buxadé	5.2% (817,000)	

== Opinion polls ==
The tables below list opinion polling results in reverse chronological order, showing the most recent first and using the dates when the survey fieldwork was done, as opposed to the date of publication. Where the fieldwork dates are unknown, the date of publication is given instead. The highest percentage figure in each polling survey is displayed with its background shaded in the leading party's colour. If a tie ensues, this is applied to the figures with the highest percentages. The "Lead" column on the right shows the percentage-point difference between the parties with the highest percentages in a poll.

=== Voting intention estimates ===
The table below lists weighted voting intention estimates. Refusals are generally excluded from the party vote percentages, while question wording and the treatment of "don't know" responses and those not intending to vote may vary between polling organisations. When available, seat projections determined by the polling organisations are displayed below (or in place of) the percentages in a smaller font.

Color key:

Poll conducted after legal ban on opinion polls

Polling firm/Commissioner	Fieldwork date	Sample size	Turnout	PP	PSOE	IU	Podemos	UPyD	AR	CEUS	Cs	CpE	Vox	PACMA	Unidas Podemos Cambiar Europa	Junts	Lead
2019 EP election	26 May 2019	—N/a	60.7	20.2; 12	32.9; 20	(Note: Within Unidas Podemos Cambiar Europa.)		(Note: Within Cs.)	5.6; 3	2.8; 1	12.2; 7	1.3; 0	6.2; 3	1.3; 0	10.1; 6	4.5; 2	12.7
Celeste-Tel/eldiario.es	26 May 2019	1,100	?	17.3; 11	28.4; 18				6.0; 3	3.1; 1	16.0; 9	1.5; 0	6.5; 4	1.5; 0	12.4; 7	2.8; 1	11.1
GAD3/ABC	22–24 May 2019	2,100	?	19.5; 11/12	30.3; 18				3.5; 2	? 0/1	14.2; 8	–	8.2; 4/5	–	11.8; 7	4.8; 2/3	10.8
ElectoPanel/Electomanía	29 Apr–23 May 2019	7,700	?	16.8; 10	28.4; 17				5.2; 3	1.5; 0	17.1; 10	1.4; 0	8.4; 5	1.5; 0	12.3; 7	4.4; 2	11.3
ElectoPanel/Electomanía	29 Apr–22 May 2019	7,700	?	16.9; 10	28.3; 17				5.2; 3	1.5; 0	17.0; 10	1.3; 0	8.3; 5	1.5; 0	12.4; 7	4.1; 2	11.3
ElectoPanel/Electomanía	29 Apr–21 May 2019	7,700	?	16.7; 10	28.4; 16				5.0; 3	1.4; 0	17.1; 10	1.2; 0	8.1; 5	1.6; 1	12.2; 7	4.2; 2	11.3
ElectoPanel/Electomanía	29 Apr–20 May 2019	7,700	?	16.8; 10	28.4; 16				5.1; 3	1.4; 0	16.7; 10	1.2; 0	8.4; 5	1.7; 1	12.4; 7	4.0; 2	11.6
Sigma Dos/El Mundo	20 May 2019	?	?	16.8; 9/10	32.1; 18/20				5.2; 3	2.3; 1	15.8; 9/10	–	8.5; 5	–	10.2; 6	2.4; 1	15.3
GAD3/ABC	17–20 May 2019	1,000	?	19.7; 11/12	32.9; 19/20				3.5; 1/2	1.8; 0/1	13.5; 8/9	–	6.8; 3/4	–	10.6; 6/7	4.8; 2/3	13.2
GIPEyOP	7–20 May 2019	2,757	?	14.9– 17.6; 8/11	26.3– 29.1; 14/19				4.0– 5.0; 2/3	1.4– 2.7; 0/1	15.8– 19.2; 8/12	1.4– 2.3; 0/1	8.7– 11.0; 4/7	0.4– 2.0; 0/1	13.4– 16.3; 7/10	2.4– 3.5; 1/2	9.9– 10.5
NC Report/La Razón	19 May 2019	?	?	19.3; 11	30.1; 18				? 3	? 1	15.9; 9	–	7.2; 4	–	13.3; 7	? 1	10.8
ElectoPanel/Electomanía	29 Apr–19 May 2019	7,700	?	16.7; 10	28.2; 17				4.9; 2	1.5; 0	16.8; 10	1.2; 0	8.2; 5	1.8; 1	12.8; 7	4.1; 2	11.4
ElectoPanel/Electomanía	29 Apr–18 May 2019	5,000	?	16.8; 10	26.8; 16				5.0; 3	1.5; 0	16.9; 10	1.3; 0	8.3; 4	2.0; 1	14.0; 8	4.0; 2	9.9
KeyData/Público	16 May 2019	?	64.0	17.5; 10	28.8; 17				5.0; 2	1.8; 1	15.8; 9	1.5; 0	9.7; 6	1.3; 0	13.8; 8	2.9; 1	11.3
ElectoPanel/Electomanía	29 Apr–16 May 2019	5,000	?	16.3; 10	25.7; 15				5.4; 3	1.5; 0	16.9; 10	1.5; 0	8.7; 5	2.5; 1	14.1; 8	3.5; 2	8.8
Celeste-Tel/eldiario.es	13–16 May 2019	1,100	?	17.9; 10	28.9; 17				5.8; 3	2.3; 1	16.5; 9	1.8; 1	7.2; 4	2.0; 1	12.8; 7	2.0; 1	11.0
DYM/El Independiente	10–15 May 2019	1,003	?	20.0; 12/13	30.0; 19/20				6.0; 3	–	16.0; 9/10	–	8.0; 5	–	14.0; 8	3.0; 1	10.0
Metroscopia/Henneo	9–14 May 2019	1,700	66–67	19.6; 11	30.8; 18				3.8; 2	–	15.6; 9	–	7.7; 4	–	14.4; 8	3.3; 2	11.2
ElectoPanel/Electomanía	29 Apr–14 May 2019	5,000	?	15.6; 9	24.7; 15				5.5; 3	1.6; 0	17.7; 11	1.4; 0	9.5; 5	2.8; 1	14.2; 8	3.3; 2	7.0
ElectoPanel/Electomanía	29 Apr–12 May 2019	5,000	?	15.2; 9	24.6; 15				5.5; 3	1.5; 0	17.7; 10	1.4; 0	10.0; 6	2.7; 1	13.9; 8	3.3; 2	6.9
40dB/El País	6–10 May 2019	1,501	?	18.9; 11	28.9; 17				5.5; 3	–	16.1; 9	–	8.4; 4/5	–	14.8; 8/9	2.5; 1	10.0
ElectoPanel/Electomanía	29 Apr–10 May 2019	5,000	?	15.0; 9	23.7; 14				5.4; 3	1.5; 0	18.2; 11	1.5; 0	10.2; 6	2.7; 1	14.2; 8	3.7; 2	5.5
ElectoPanel/Electomanía	29 Apr–8 May 2019	5,000	?	14.9; 9	22.9; 13				5.8; 3	1.6; 0	18.3; 11	1.6; 1	10.3; 6	2.6; 1	14.1; 8	3.5; 2	4.6
GAD3/ABC	3–6 May 2019	830	?	18.5; 12	30.3; 20				5.0; 3	1.6; 1	16.6; 10	–	7.8; 5	–	11.4; 7	3.0; 1	11.8
ElectoPanel/Electomanía	29 Apr–6 May 2019	5,000	?	14.7; 8	23.0; 14				6.0; 3	1.5; 0	18.5; 11	1.7; 1	10.3; 6	2.6; 1	14.1; 8	3.4; 2	4.5
ElectoPanel/Electomanía	29 Apr–4 May 2019	5,000	?	16.0; 9	22.5; 13				6.0; 3	1.5; 0	18.1; 11	1.7; 1	9.8; 6	2.5; 1	13.9; 8	3.3; 2	4.4
2019 general election	28 Apr 2019	—N/a	71.8	16.7 (9)	28.7 (17)				5.3 (3)	2.1 (1)	15.9 (9)	1.0 (0)	10.3 (6)	1.3 (0)	14.3 (8)	1.9 (1)	12.0
CIS	21 Mar–23 Apr 2019	17,641	63	18.0– 20.0; 11/12	29.0– 31.0; 17/18				5.0– 7.0; 3	1.0– 3.0; 1	14.0– 16.0; 8/9	–	7.0– 9.0; 4/5	1.0– 2.0; 0	13.0– 15.0; 8	1.0– 3.0; 1	11.0
ElectoPanel/Electomanía	22 Feb–7 Apr 2019	9,600	?	20.0; 12/13	23.1; 13/15				5.0; 2/3	1.5 (Note: PNV only.); 0	16.8; 10	2.4; 1	11.7; 7	3.5; 2	11.2; 6/7	1.9; 1	3.1
ElectoPanel/Electomanía	22 Feb–31 Mar 2019	8,850	?	18.6; 11/12	23.2; 13/14				5.0; 2/3	1.5; 0	18.9; 11/12	2.6; 1	11.9; 7	3.4; 2	10.9; 6/7	1.7; 1	4.3
Sigma Dos/El Mundo	20–25 Mar 2019	?	?	21.8; 13/14	29.6; 18/19				4.7; 2/3	1.4; 0	13.8; 9	–	9.6; 6	1.0; 0	12.7; 7/8	1.0; 0	7.8
ElectoPanel/Electomanía	22 Feb–24 Mar 2019	8,200	?	19.0; 11/12	24.0; 14/15				5.0; 3	3.1; 1/2	18.6; 11	2.5; 1	11.3; 6/7	3.3; 1/2	10.4; 6	(Note: Within CEU.)	5.0
ElectoPanel/Electomanía	22 Feb–17 Mar 2019	7,400	?	19.6; 11/12	22.3; 13/14				5.1; 3	3.1; 1/2	17.6; 10/11	2.3; 1	13.4; 8	3.1; 1/2	10.6; 6		2.7
ElectoPanel/Electomanía	22 Feb–10 Mar 2019	6,800	?	19.0; 12	21.8; 14				5.3; 3	3.1; 2	18.3; 11	2.3; 1	13.3; 8	3.0; 1	10.9; 7		2.8
ElectoPanel/Electomanía	22 Feb–3 Mar 2019	5,200	?	19.1; 12	21.3; 13				5.1; 3	3.0; 1	18.8; 12	2.4; 1	13.4; 8	3.1; 2	11.1; 7		2.2
Sigma Dos/El Mundo	25–28 Feb 2019	1,000	?	20.3; 13	28.8; 19				4.6; 3	1.4; 0	15.1; 9	–	8.4; 5	1.3; 0	15.6; 10	1.0; 0	8.5
ElectoPanel/Electomanía	26 Jan–30 Jan 2019	2,890	?	16.0; 10	21.3; 13			–	6.3; 4	3.1; 2	21.0; 13	1.8; 1	13.0; 8	1.8; 1	11.3; 7		0.3
SocioMétrica/El Español	22 Dec–5 Jan 2019	2,200	?	18.5; 11	22.1; 14			–	5.2; 3	3.0; 1	18.2; 11	2.2; 1	13.0; 8	–	15.6; 10		3.6
ElectoPanel/Electomanía	26 May–2 Jun 2018	2,043	?	17.2; 11	21.6; 14			0.2; 0	3.3; 2	4.1; 2	22.7; 14	2.8; 1	4.6; 3	4.2; 2	16.8; 10		1.1
Desk Research/PSOE	21 May 2018	?	63	23.6; 15/16	26.4; 17/19	4.0; 2	7.7; 5	–	–	–	18.2; 12/13	–	–	–	–	–	2.8
PP	10 Apr 2018	?	?	22.0; 14	22.0; 14	6.0; 4	11.4; 7	1.8; 1	2.8; 1	2.4; 1	16.2; 10	2.6; 1	4.2; 2	2.3; 1	–	4.6; 3	Tie
Desk Research/PSOE	9 Apr 2018	10,000	63	24.0; 16/17	26.0; 17/19	4.0; 2	8.0; 5	–	–	–	17.0; 11/12	–	–	–	–	–	2.0
2015 general election	26 Jun 2016	—N/a	66.5	33.0 (20)	22.6 (14)			0.2 (0)	3.6 (2)	3.6 (2)	13.1 (8)		0.2 (0)	1.2 (0)	21.2 (13)	–	10.4
2015 general election	20 Dec 2015	—N/a	69.7	28.7 (18)	22.0 (14)	3.7 (2)	20.7 (13)	0.6 (0)	3.6 (2)	3.9 (2)	13.9 (8)	(Note: Within Podemos)	0.2 (0)	0.9 (0)	–	–	6.7
2014 EP election	25 May 2014	—N/a	43.8	26.1; 16	23.0; 14	10.0; 6	8.0; 5	6.5; 4	6.1; 3	5.4; 3	3.2; 2	1.9; 1	1.6; 0	1.1; 0	–	–	3.1

=== Voting preferences ===
The table below lists raw, unweighted voting preferences.

Polling firm/Commissioner	Fieldwork date	Sample size	PP	PSOE	IU	Podemos	UPyD	AR	CEUS	Cs	CpE	Vox	PACMA	Unidas Podemos Cambiar Europa	Junts	Question	X mark	Lead
2019 EP election (Note: Does not include non-resident citizens.)	26 May 2019	—N/a	12.8	20.9				3.6	1.8	7.8	0.8	4.0	0.8	6.4	2.9	—N/a	35.8	8.1
40dB/El País	6–10 May 2019	1,501	6.5	18.1				4.0	1.0	9.9	0.9	4.9	1.8	14.5	3.7	27.0	3.9	3.6
CIS	21 Mar–23 Apr 2019	17,641	9.6	18.7				3.6	0.8	5.5	–	2.6	0.7	7.0	0.9	38.2	10.4	9.1
2014 EP election	25 May 2014	—N/a	11.7	10.4	4.5	3.6	2.9	2.6	2.4	1.4	0.9	0.7	0.5	–	–	—N/a	54.2	1.3

== Results ==
=== Overall ===
← Summary of the 26 May 2019 European Parliament election results in Spain →
Parties and alliances	Popular vote			Seats	
Parties and alliances	Votes	%	±pp	Total	+/−
Spanish Socialist Workers' Party (PSOE)^{1}	7,369,789	32.86	+9.85	21	+7
People's Party (PP)^{1}	4,519,205	20.15	−5.94	13	−3
Citizens–Party of the Citizenry (Cs)^{1} ^{2}	2,731,825	12.18	+2.51	8	+2
United We Can Change Europe (Podemos–IU)^{3}	2,258,857	10.07	−7.94	6	−5
Vox (Vox)^{1}	1,393,684	6.21	+4.64	4	+4
Republics Now (Ahora Repúblicas)^{4}	1,252,139	5.58	−0.51	3	±0
Free for Europe (Junts)^{1} ^{5}	1,018,435	4.54	+1.04	3	+1
Coalition for a Solidary Europe (CEUS)^{6}	633,090	2.82	+0.89	1	±0
Commitment to Europe (CpE)^{7}	296,491	1.32	−0.60	0	−1
Animalist Party Against Mistreatment of Animals (PACMA)	295,546	1.32	+0.19	0	±0
Green Coalition–Citizen Europe (CV–EC)	65,504	0.29	New	0	±0
Zero Cuts–The Greens–European Green Group (Recortes Cero–LV–GVE)	50,002	0.22	+0.02	0	±0
Volt Europa (Volt)	32,432	0.14	New	0	±0
Feminist Initiative (IFem)	29,276	0.13	−0.02	0	±0
Communists (PCPE–PCPC–PCPA)	28,508	0.13	−0.06	0	±0
Act (PACT)	25,528	0.11	New	0	±0
Andalusia by Herself (AxSí)^{8}	23,995	0.11	−0.21	0	±0
For a Fairer World (PUM+J)	21,584	0.10	New	0	±0
Communist Party of the Workers of Spain (PCTE)	19,080	0.09	New	0	±0
Pirates of Catalonia–European Pirates (pirates.cat/ep)	16,755	0.07	−0.18	0	±0
Centrists for Europe (CCD–Lliures–UIJ–centrados)	15,615	0.07	New	0	±0
Forum of Citizens (FAC)	14,175	0.06	−0.15	0	±0
Positive Left (IZQP)	12,939	0.06	New	0	±0
With You, We Are Democracy (Contigo)	12,430	0.06	New	0	±0
Extremadurans (CEx–CREx–PREx)	11,894	0.05	+0.01	0	±0
FE de las JONS–Spanish Alternative–La Falange–National Democracy (ADÑ)^{9}	11,699	0.05	−0.39	0	±0
Republican Alternative (ALTER)	11,076	0.05	±0.00	0	±0
Actual Equality (IGRE)	9,076	0.04	New	0	±0
Red Current Movement (MCR)	8,402	0.04	+0.01	0	±0
Humanist Party (PH)	7,947	0.04	−0.05	0	±0
Euro Latino Independent Movement (MIEL)	6,809	0.03	New	0	±0
Internationalist Solidarity and Self-Management (SAIn)	5,543	0.02	−0.02	0	±0
Blank ballots	216,736	0.97	−1.33		
Total^{1}	22,426,066			59	+5
Valid votes	22,426,066	99.14	+0.94		
Invalid votes	193,918	0.86	−0.94		
Votes cast / turnout	22,619,984	60.73	+16.92		
Abstentions	14,628,904	39.27	−16.92		
Registered voters	37,248,888				
Sources
Footnotes: ^{1} Initially, Spain was allocated 54 seats, which were distributed as follows: PSOE (20), PP (12), Cs (7), Podemos–IU (6), Vox (3), Ahora Repúblicas (3), Junts (2) and CEUS (1). However, as a result of Brexit, Spain's MEP delegation grew to 59, with the additional 5 seats being allocated to PSOE (1), PP (1), Cs (1), Vox (1) and Junts (1).; ^{2} Citizens–Party of the Citizenry results are compared to the combined totals of Union, Progress and Democracy and Citizens–Party of the Citizenry in the 2014 election.; ^{3} United We Can Change Europe results are compared to the combined totals of Plural Left and We Can in the 2014 election.; ^{4} Republics Now results are compared to the combined totals of The Left for the Right to Decide and The Peoples Decide in the 2014 election.; ^{5} Free for Europe results are compared to Coalition for Europe totals in Catalonia in the 2014 election.; ^{6} Coalition for a Solidary Europe results are compared to Coalition for Europe totals in the 2014 election, not including results in Catalonia.; ^{7} Commitment to Europe results are compared to European Spring totals in the 2014 election.; ^{8} Andalusia by Herself results are compared to Andalusian Party totals in the 2014 election.; ^{9} FE de las JONS–Spanish Alternative–La Falange–National Democracy results are compared to the combined totals of Spanish Phalanx of the CNSO, Social Impulse, Spain on the Move and National Democracy in the 2014 election.

Popular vote
PSOE	32.86%
PP	20.15%
Cs	12.18%
Podemos–IU	10.07%
Vox	6.21%
Ahora Repúblicas	5.58%
Junts	4.54%
CEUS	2.82%
CpE	1.32%
PACMA	1.32%
Others	1.96%
Blank ballots	0.97%

Seats
PSOE	35.59%
PP	22.03%
Cs	13.56%
Podemos–IU	10.17%
Vox	6.78%
Ahora Repúblicas	5.08%
Junts	5.08%
CEUS	1.69%

=== Maps ===
Vote winner strength by province.

Vote winner strength by autonomous community.

=== Distribution by European group ===
Summary of political group distribution in the 9th European Parliament (2019–2024)
Groups	Parties	Seats	Total	%
Progressive Alliance of Socialists and Democrats (S&D)	Spanish Socialist Workers' Party (PSOE)	21	21	35.59
European People's Party (EPP)	People's Party (PP)	13	13	22.03
Renew Europe (RE)	Citizens–Party of the Citizenry (Cs); Basque Nationalist Party (EAJ/PNV)	8; 1	9	15.25
European United Left–Nordic Green Left (GUE/NGL)	We Can (Podemos); United Left (IU); Basque Country Gather (EH Bildu)	3; 2; 1	6	10.17
European Conservatives and Reformists (ECR)	Vox (Vox)	4	4	6.78
Greens–European Free Alliance (Greens/EFA)	Republican Left of Catalonia (ERC); Catalonia in Common (CatComú)	2; 1	3	5.08
Non-Inscrits (NI)	Together for Catalonia (JxCat)	2	2	3.39
Total		59	59	100.00

=== Elected legislators ===
The following table lists the elected legislators:

Elected legislators
#	Name	List
1	Josep Borrell Fontelles	PSOE
2	Dolors Montserrat Montserrat	PP
3	Iratxe García Pérez	PSOE
4	Luis Garicano Gabilondo	Cs
5	Lina Gálvez Muñoz	PSOE
6	Esteban González Pons	PP
7	María Eugenia Rodríguez Palop	Podemos–IU
8	Javier López Fernández	PSOE
9	Antonio Javier López-Istúriz White	PP
10	Inmaculada Rodríguez-Piñero Fernández	PSOE
11	Jorge Buxadé Villalba	Vox
12	María Teresa Pagazaurtundúa Ruiz	Cs
13	Oriol Junqueras i Vies	Ahora Repúblicas
14	Iban García del Blanco	PSOE
15	Juan Ignacio Zoido Álvarez	PP
16	Sira Abed Rego	Podemos–IU
17	Eider Gardiazabal Rubial	PSOE
18	Carles Puigdemont i Casamajó	Junts
19	Nicolás González Casares	PSOE
20	María Soraya Rodríguez Ramos	Cs
21	Pilar del Castillo Vera	PP
22	Cristina Maestre Martín de Almagro	PSOE
23	Francisco Javier Zarzalejos Nieto	PP
24	Ernest Urtasun Domenech	Podemos–IU
25	César Luena López	PSOE
26	Mazaly Aguilar	Vox
27	Javier Nart Peñalver	Cs
28	Clara Eugenia Aguilera García	PSOE
29	José Manuel García-Margallo y Marfil	PP
30	Izaskun Bilbao Barandica	CEUS
31	Pernando Barrena Arza	Ahora Repúblicas
32	Ignacio Sánchez Amor	PSOE
33	Mónica Silvana González González	PSOE
34	Francisco José Ricardo Millán Mon	PP
35	Idoia Villanueva Ruiz	Podemos–IU
36	José Ramón Bauzá Díaz	Cs
37	Juan Fernando López Aguilar	PSOE
38	Antoni Comín i Oliveres	Junts
39	María Rosa Estarás Ferragut	PP
40	Adriana Maldonado López	PSOE
41	Hermann Leopold Tertsch del Valle-Lersundi	Vox
42	Jonás Fernández Álvarez	PSOE
43	Jordi Cañas Pérez	Cs
44	Isabel Benjumea Benjumea	PP
45	Miguel Urbán Crespo	Podemos–IU
46	Alícia Homs Ginel	PSOE
47	Diana Riba i Giner	Ahora Repúblicas
48	Pablo Arias Echeverría	PP
49	Javier Moreno Sánchez	PSOE
50	Susana Solís Pérez	Cs
51	Isabel García Muñoz	PSOE
52	Leopoldo López Gil	PP
53	Manuel Pineda Marín	Podemos–IU
54	Domènec Miguel Ruiz Devesa	PSOE
55	Estrella Durá Ferrandis	PSOE
56	Gabriel Mato Adrover	PP
57	Margarita de la Pisa Carrión	Vox
58	Clara Ponsatí i Obiols	Junts
59	Adrián Vázquez Lázara	Cs

== Bibliography ==
- Ley Orgánica 5/1985, de 19 de junio, del Régimen Electoral General (Organic Law 5/1985). Official State Gazette (in Spanish). 19 June 1985 [version as of 30 January 2019]. BOE-A-1985-11672.
- Treaty of Lisbon amending the Treaty on European Union and the Treaty establishing the European Community (2007/C 306/01). Official Journal of the European Union. 17 December 2007. 12007L/TXT.
- European Council Decision (EU) establishing the composition of the European Parliament (European Council Decision (EU) 2018/937). Official Journal of the European Union. 28 June 2018. 32018D0937.
