= Ferrandis =

Ferrandis is a Spanish surname. It is of West Gothic etymology and is a variant of the surname Fernando.

Notable people with the surname include:

- Antonio Ferrandis (1921–2000), Spanish actor
- Dylan Ferrandis (born 1994), French motorcycle racer
- Estrella Durá Ferrandis (born 1963), professor of psychology at the University of Valencia and politician

== See also ==
- Ferrandi, surname
