= Ferrandi =

Ferrandi is a surname. Notable people with the surname include:

- George Ferrandi (born 1967), American artist
- John Ferrandi (1930–2019), South African cricketer
- Roland Ferrandi (born 1958), Corsican composer-ceterist, lutenist and theorbist

== See also ==
- Ferrandis, surname
