= Xabier Zumalde =

Spanish-Basque ETA's militant (1938–2023)

- Zumalde in 1968

Military Chief of ETA
- In office 1965–1976

Personal details
- Born: 27 August 1938 Amorebieta-Etxano, Spain
- Died: 5 November 2023 (aged 85) Ascain, France
- Party: ETA
- Occupation: Militant

Xabier Zumalde Romero (27 August 1938 – 5 November 2023) was a Spanish-Basque militant of ETA. He was ETA's military chief from 1965 to 1976.

== Biography ==
Born in Amorebieta-Etxano on 27 August 1938, Zumalde was the son of Republican parents who fought in the Spanish Civil War. He started working at the age of 12 under the regime of Francisco Franco. He started out as an apprentice metalworker and passed time in the factory by building a Winchester rifle, which was later confiscated by the Civil Guard. At the age of 18, he volunteered with the Chasseurs Alpins, where he learned about the use of weapons.

Zumalde had his first contact with ETA while in detention at a police station. He then met with a priest in Amorebieta-Etxano, who made an appointment with ETA on his behalf. During his time as a liaison, he delivered a Sten submachine gun, a Luger pistol, a Star Bonifacio Echeverria handgun, and two hand bombs which he concealed near a church in Amorebieta-Etxano. In June 1965, he attended the 4th ETA assembly, where he was named military chief of the group despite barely knowing them. He took the alias El Cabra, meaning "The Goat". He became an instructor of psychological guerrilla warfare and recruited many who recognized him as an elite military leader, particularly those within the French Basque Country. On 7 June 1968, Spanish Civil Guard José Pardines was shot dead in Amasa-Villabona, but Zumalde claimed to not be involved. In his 11 years of leadership, he changed from El Cabra to El Brujo (The Sorcerer).

After the death of Franco, Zumalde ceased his activities with ETA in 1976. On 15 October 1977, ETA made contact with him again, but he refused. He later denounced the organization in an interview, claiming that "ETA has no doctrine, only hatred". Later in life, he was honored for his patent on a device that aided those with limited mobility with getting in and out of the bathtub.

Zumalde married his wife, Sabine, on 4 July 1966 at the Sanctuary of Arantzazu, who was also active in militancy.

Xabier Zumalde died in Ascain on 5 November 2023, at the age of 85.

== Works ==
- Mi Lucha Clandestina En ETA: Memorias del primer jefe del Frente Militar (1965-1968) (in Spanish). Status Ediciones. 2004. ISBN 978-84-932293-2-0. OCLC 54881505. OL 10294584W.
- Las Botas de La Guerrilla: Memorias del jefe de los grupos autónomos de ETA (1969-1977) (in Spanish). Status Ediciones. 2004. ISBN 978-84-932293-4-4. OCLC 57572871. OL 10294583W.
