= Iban García del Blanco =

Spanish politician

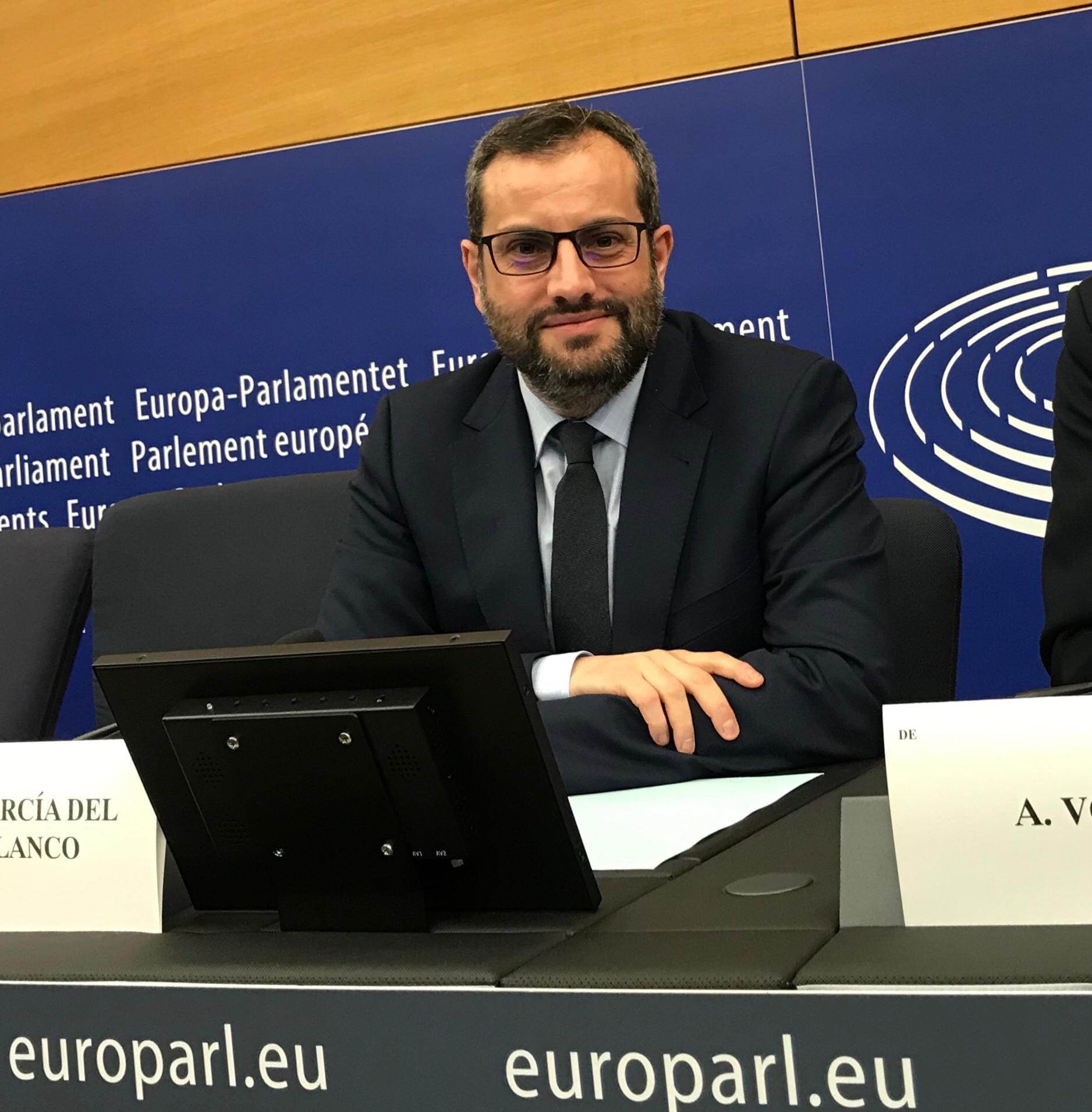

Member of the European Parliament
- In office 2 July 2019 – 16 July 2024
- Constituency: Spain

Personal details
- Born: 8 February 1977 (age 49) León, Spain
- Party: Spanish Socialist Workers' Party
- Education: University of León

Iban García del Blanco (Spanish pronunciation: [iˈβaŋ gaɾˈθi.a ðel ˈβlaŋko]; born 1977) is a Spanish politician, who was elected as a Member of the European Parliament in 2019.

== Early life and education ==
Born on 8 February 1977 in León, García del Blanco earned a licentiate degree in Law from the University of León.

== Political career ==
=== Career in local politics ===
García del Blanco served as León municipal councillor, provincial deputy in León and Senator. He was appointed to the post of chairman of Acción Cultural Española in 2018.

=== Member of the European Parliament, 2019–present ===
García del Blanco stood as candidate for the 2019 European election in Spain, included sixth in the PSOE list. Elected as member of the European Parliament, he joined the Committee on Legal Affairs.

In addition to his committee assignments, García del Blanco is part of the Spinelli Group and the European Parliament Intergroup on Artificial Intelligence and Digital.
