= Alícia Homs Ginel =

Spanish politician

Alícia Homs Ginel MEP
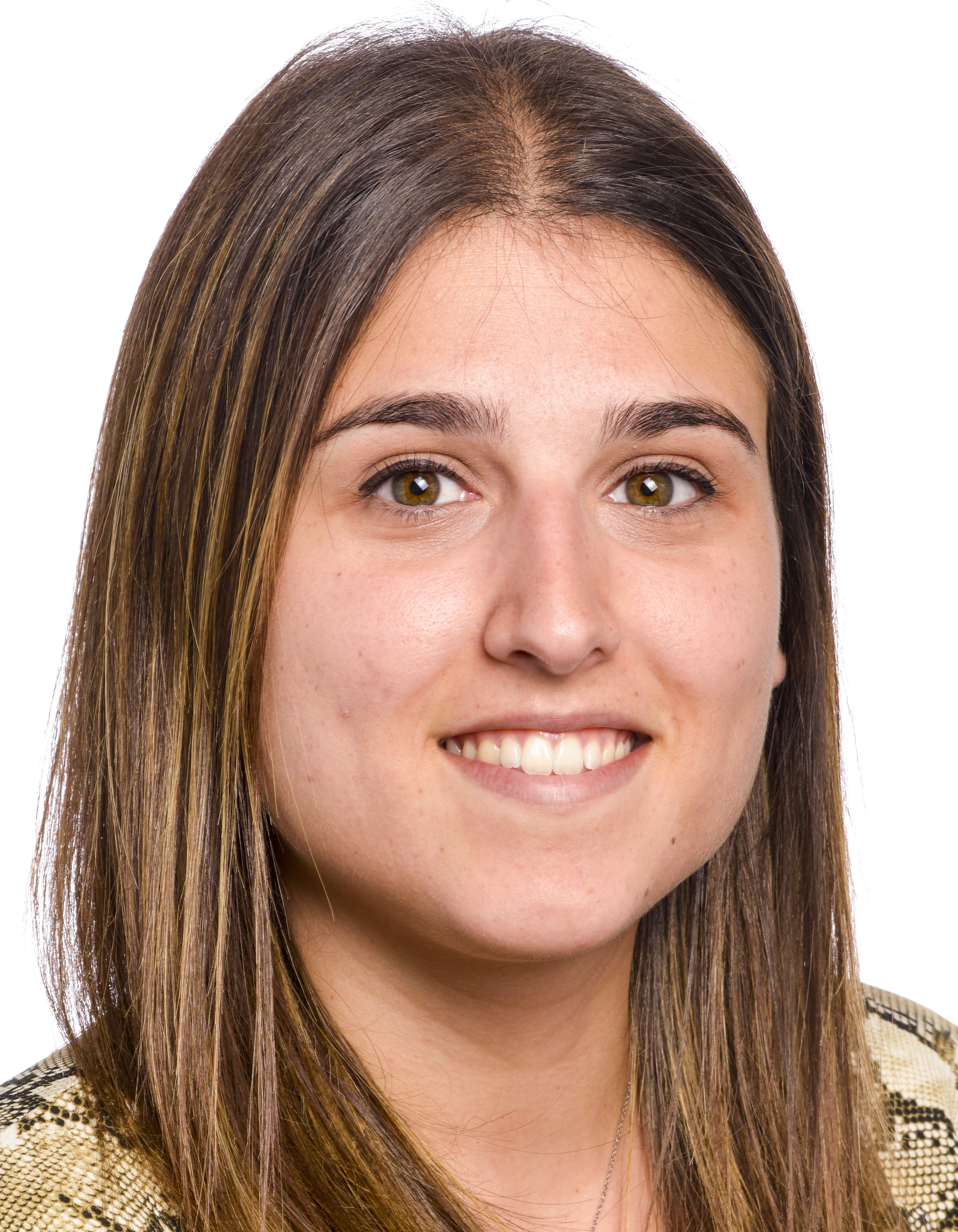

Member of the European Parliament for Spain
- Incumbent
- Assumed office 2 July 2019

Personal details
- Born: 15 October 1993 (age 32) Palma de Mallorca, Spain
- Party: Spanish Socialist Workers' Party

Alícia Homs Ginel (Catalan pronunciation: [əˈɫisiə ˈɔms]; born 15 October 1993) is a Spanish politician who served as a Member of the European Parliament from 2019.

== Education and early career ==
Born on 15 October 1993 in Palma de Mallorca, she obtained a degree in Political Science and Public Management at the Autonomous University of Barcelona.

Homs subsequently worked as technical advisor to the Regional Ministry of Labor of the Balearic Islands.

== Political career ==
Homs, who ran 17th in the Spanish Socialist Workers' Party list for the 2019 European Parliament election in Spain, was elected MEP. In parliament, she served on the Committee on Employment and Social Affairs.

In addition to her committee assignments, Homs was part of the European Parliament Intergroup on Disability, the European Parliament Intergroup on Seas, Rivers, Islands and Coastal Areas and the Spinelli Group.
