= Cristina Maestre =

Spanish politician

Cristina Maestre MEP
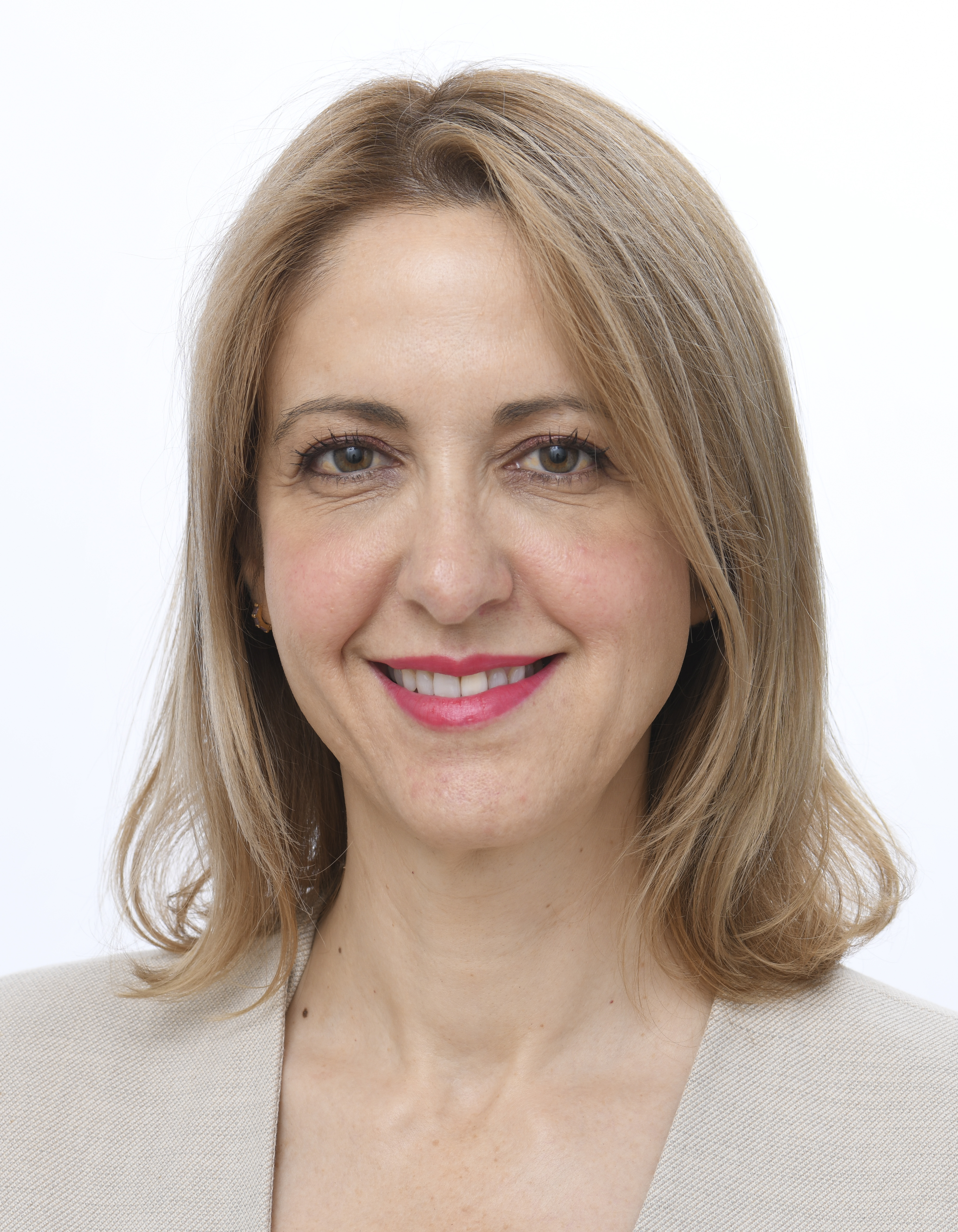

Member of the European Parliament for Spain
- Incumbent
- Assumed office 2 July 2019

Personal details
- Party: Spanish Socialist Workers' Party

Cristina Maestre Martín de Almagro (pronounced [kɾisˈtina maˈestɾe]) is a Spanish politician of the Spanish Socialist Workers' Party (PSOE) who has been serving as a Member of the European Parliament since 2019.

== Political career ==
Maestre served as municipal councillor in Daimiel from 2003 to 2015 to and as member of the Senate from 2004 to 2011.

In the European Parliament, Maestre has been serving on the Committee on Petitions and the Committee on Regional Development. In addition to her committee assignments, she is part of the Parliament's delegation for relations with China. She is also a member of the European Parliament Intergroup on Small and Medium-Sized Enterprises (SMEs).
