= Mazaly Aguilar =

Spanish politician

Mazaly Aguilar MEP
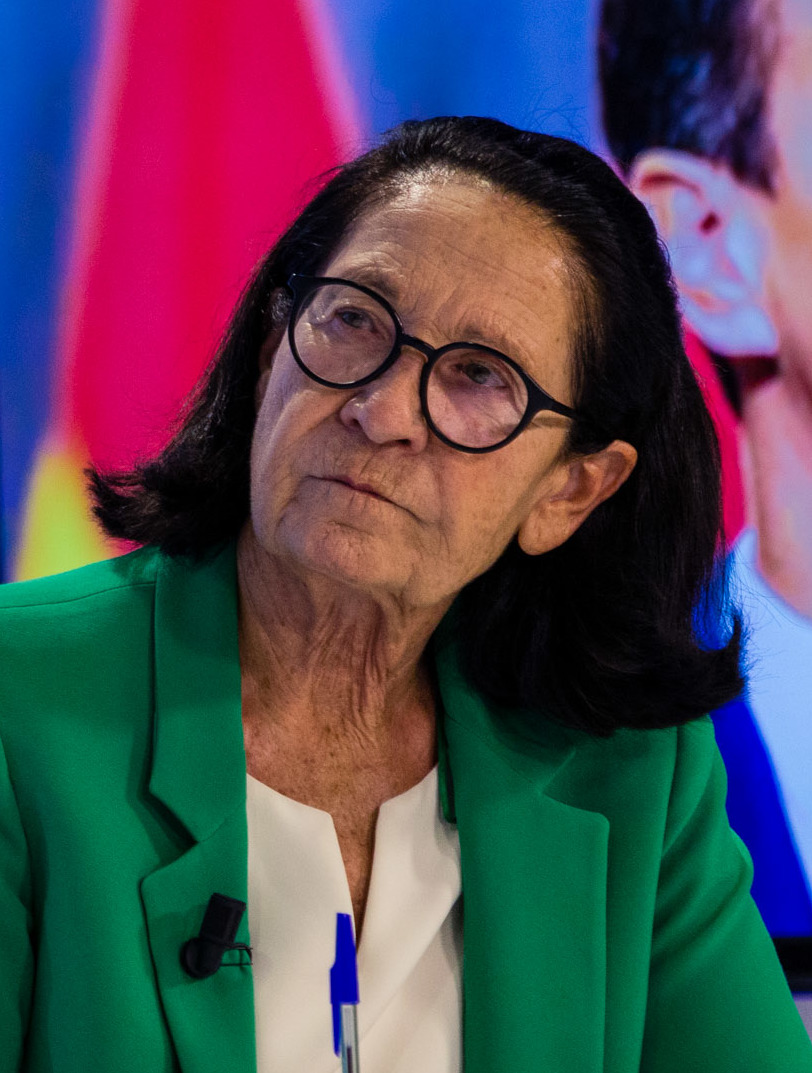

Member of the European Parliament for Spain
- Incumbent
- Assumed office 2 July 2019

Personal details
- Born: 20 September 1949 (age 77) Cuenca, Spain
- Party: Vox

Mazaly Aguilar Pinar (pronounced [maˈθali aɣiˈlaɾ]; born 20 September 1949) is a Spanish politician of the political party Vox, who was elected as a Member of the European Parliament in 2019.

Mazaly Aguilar has a degree in Economics from the Complutense University of Madrid. She has worked for twenty-five years in various companies (Bank of America, BBVA, Banesto, Trasmediterrànea, Airtel-Vodafone).

Mazaly Aguilar is Vice President of Vox, responsible for relations with private bodies and public institutions.

On 26 May 2019, she was elected Member of the European Parliament. As Vice-Chairwoman of the Agriculture Committee, despite her inexperience in this field, she has committed herself to defending the Community aid paid to Spanish farmers under the Common Agricultural Policy and to being vigilant about the Free Trade Agreement between Mercosur and the European Union, without opposing it.
