= María Eugenia Rodríguez Palop =

Spanish jurist

María Eugenia R. Palop
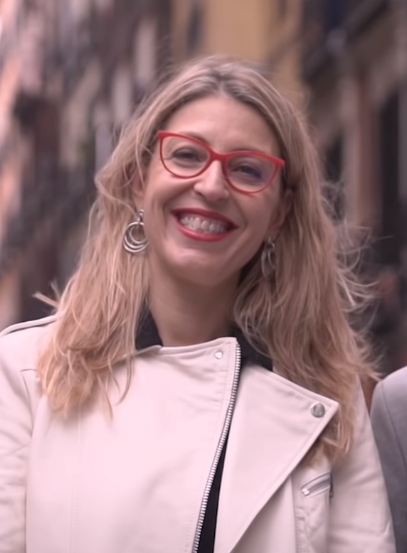

Member of European Parliament
- In office 2 July 2019 – 16 July 2024
- Constituency: Spain

Personal details
- Born: 9 March 1970 (age 56) Llerena, Spain
- Citizenship: Spanish
- Party: Movimiento Sumar (since 2023)
- Other political affiliations: Independent (linked to Podemos from 2019 to 2023)
- Occupation: Jurist, professor, columnist

María Eugenia Rodríguez Palop (Spanish pronunciation: [maɾja.ewˈxenja roˈðɾiɣeθ paˈlop]; born 1970) is a Spanish jurist, professor of Philosophy of Law at the Charles III University of Madrid (UC3M), specializing in human rights.

== Biography ==
Born on 9 March 1970 in Llerena, a town in the province of Badajoz, she obtained a degree in Law at the Comillas Pontifical University in 1993, later obtaining a PhD in the same field at the UC3M in 2000.

A professor of Philosophy of Law at the Charles III University of Madrid (UC3M), specialized in human rights, she has also worked a researcher at the Institute of Genre Studies and the Institute of Human Rights "Bartolomé de las Casas" in the UC3M. Self-described as "feminist" and "ecologist", she was one of the 60 scholars signatories of a manifesto claiming for a reform of the Spanish Constitution aiming to promote a "federal political project" in June 2018.

In March, following the announcement of the resignation of Pablo Bustinduy to run as leader of the Unidas Podemos candidacy to the 2019 European Parliament election in Spain, Podemos and Bustinduy presented Rodríguez Palop as his replacement. Rodríguez Palop, described then by Bustinduy as a "political and moral mainstay", had previously provided advisory services to the Podemos parliamentary group in the Congress of Deputies.

== Works ==
- Rodríguez Palop, María Eugenia (2002). La nueva generación de derechos humanos. Origen y justificación. Madrid: Dykinson.
- Rodríguez Palop, María Eugenia (2011). Claves para entender los nuevos derechos humanos. Madrid: Catarata.
- Rodríguez Palop, María Eugenia (2019). Revolución feminista y políticas de lo común frente a la extrema derecha. Icaria.

== Bibliography ==
- Barranco Avilés, María del Carmen (2003). "Rodríguez Palop, María Eugenia: La nueva generación de derechos humanos. Origen y justificación". Anuario de Filosofía del Derecho. Madrid: Ministry of Justice & Boletín Oficial del Estado & Sociedad Española de Filosofía Jurídica y Política: 399–402. ISSN 0518-0872.
- Haro García, Diego (2013). "María Eugenia Rodríguez Palop. Claves para entender los nuevos derechos humanos". Revista Derechos y Libertades (28). Getafe: 219–226.
- Rey Pérez, José Luis (2002). "María Eugenia Rodríguez Palop la nueva generación de derechos humanos. Origen y justificación". Revista Derechos y Libertades. 7 (11): 681–687.
