= Amasa-Villabona =

- Municipality
- Coat of arms

- Location of Amasa-Villabona within the Basque Autonomous Community Location of Amasa-Villabona within Spain
- Coordinates: 43°11′17″N 02°03′09″W
- Country: Spain
- Autonomous community: Basque Country
- Province: Gipuzkoa
- Comarca: Tolosaldea
- Established: 1490

Government
  - Mayor: Beatriz Unzue Esnaola (Bildu)

Area
  - Total: 17.74 km^{2} (6.85 sq mi)
- Elevation: 62 m (203 ft)

Population (2025-01-01)
  - Total: 5,900
  - Density: 330/km^{2} (860/sq mi)
- Time zone: UTC+1 (CET)
  - Summer (DST): UTC+2 (CEST)
- Postal code: 20150
- Website: villabona.eus

Amasa-Villabona is a village of over 5500 inhabitants in the comarca of Tolosaldea, Gipuzkoa province, Basque Country, Spain. It has an urban area, Villabona, close to the Oria River, and a rural area, Amasa, around which the village originally formed. Amasa-Villabona is located in the Oria Valley, in the foothills of Mount Gazume and Mount Uzturre. It is about 20 kilometres (12 mi) from the provincial capital, San Sebastián.

The village originally grew around the Amasa Quarter, in Amasa-Villabona's highest area. In 1619, both settlements set up a joint town council. The Parish Church of San Martín de Tours stands in Amasa. This church, built between the 16th and 18th centuries, has an interesting high altarpiece. Close by is the Hermitage of Santa Cruz, the first parish of the area.

There are a great number of agrotourism lodgings offering endless activities. The main tourist appeal is in its rural and mountain setting. There are two competitions of rebote, celebrated in July and September. Rebote is a style of the Basque sport pelota that is only played in Amasa-Villabona and Zubieta. During the San Martín Festivities in November, Amasa celebrates the traditional Oilasko Jokua. Boys, with their eyes covered, move forward to the sound of a music that tries to mislead them. They have to find a chicken, hit it with a sickle, and cut its head off.

Between 2003 and 2007 the Mayor of the town was Bakartxo Tejeria who went on to be President of the Basque Parliament in 2012.
