= Francesc Gambús =

Spanish politician (1974–2019)

Francesc Gambús MEP
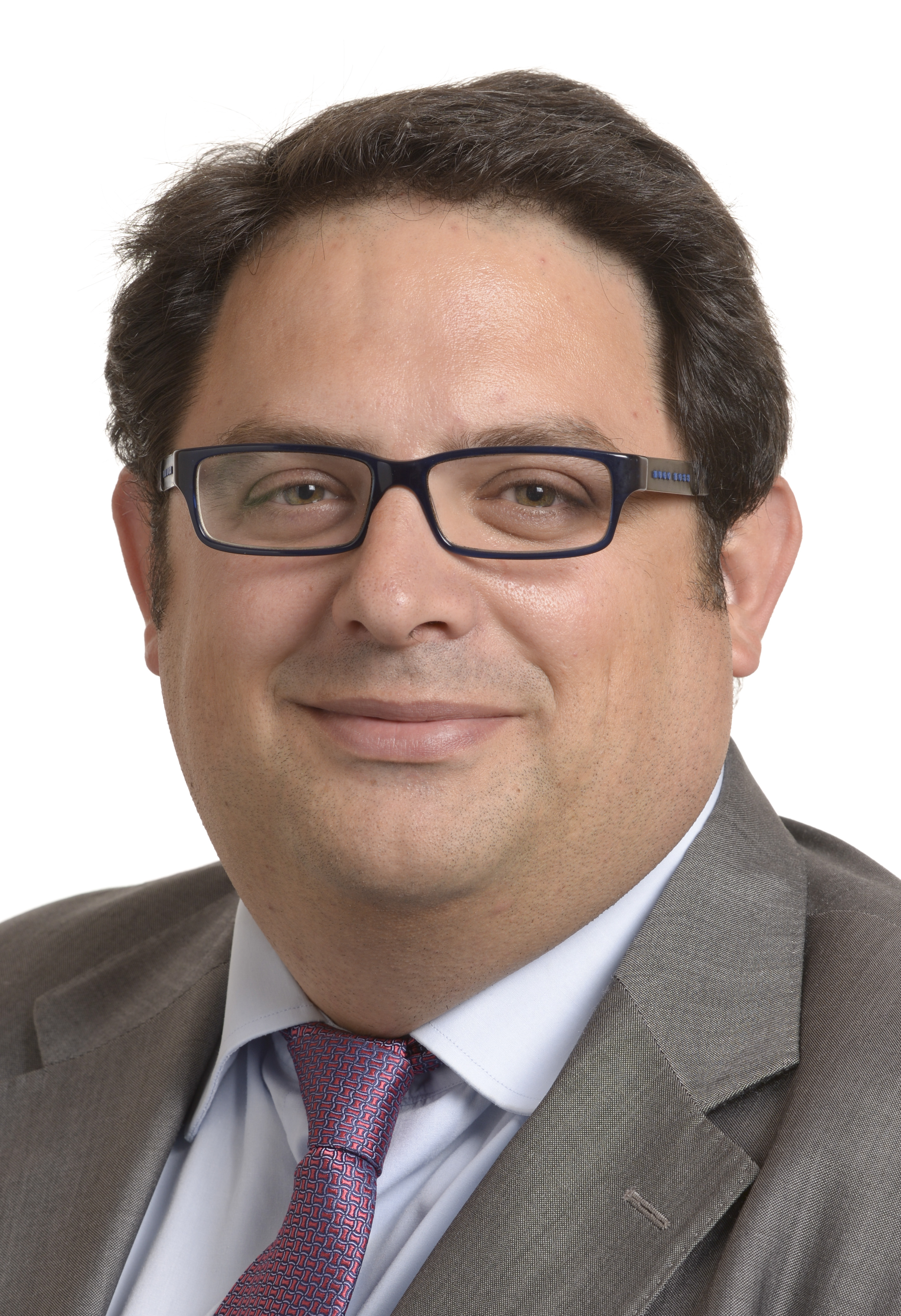
- Official portrait, 2014

Member of European Parliament representing Spain
- In office 1 July 2014 – 29 May 2019

Personal details
- Born: Francesc de Paula Gambús i Millet; 21 May 1974 Barcelona, Spain
- Died: 23 November 2019 (aged 45) Brussels, Belgium
- Party: UDC

Francesc de Paula Gambús i Millet (21 May 1974 – 23 November 2019) was a Spanish politician who served as a Member of the European Parliament.

== Political career ==
In 1995 Gambús joined the youth movement of the Democratic Union of Catalonia party or UDC. He was advisor to the UDC member of European Parliament of MED Concepció Ferrer in the European Parliament from 1998 to 2004. Subsequently he was part of the CiU advisory team in the Congress of Deputies from 2005 to 2007 and then was Councillor for Commerce and Consumption in Barcelona (in a municipal coalition team between PSC, CiU and ERC) between 2010 and 2011.

He was a representative of the UDC in the commission of preparation of the electoral program of CiU in the autonomous regions of 2010, after which he was appointed chief of staff of the vice president of the Catalan government Joana Ortega, and later general director of Foreign Affairs. Since 2012 he was part of the UDC governing committee.

In 2014 he was elected as the UDC candidate to the European Parliament. The UDC leadership had initially chosen Salvador Sedó as head of the party's list with Gambús in the number two spot, but Sedó than resigned to run as a candidate, bumping up Gambús to the number one spot in the party's list. Various sources pointed out that due to the bad relations with Ramon Tremosa, the MEP and number one of Convergència Democràtica de Catalunya (CDC), as well as the pressures of the latter party, not considering him sufficiently in favor of the sovereignty process. UDC denied pressuring candidates. As number three of the Coalition for Europe candidacy (after the CDC and PNV candidates), he was elected deputy in the European Parliament (he got 851 971 votes, 5.42% in all of Spain, 4 what it resulted in three seats), which will be integrated into the Group of the European People's Party.

After his departure from the European Parliament after not being able to be re-elected in the 2019 elections, he was appointed advisor to the MEP of the Popular Party María Rosa Estarás Ferragut, attached to the Parliamentary Group of the European People's Party.

On the morning of 24 November 2019, Gambús was discovered unresponsive in his hotel room in Brussels. He was transported to the hospital where he was pronounced dead shortly after.
