= Joseba Leizaola =

Spanish politician (1931–2017)

3rd President of the Basque Parliament
- In office 18 December 1990 – 1 September 1998
- Preceded by: Jesús Eguiguren Imaz
- Succeeded by: Juan María Atutxa

Member of the Basque Parliament
- In office 31 March 1980 – 1 September 1998

Second Vice President of the Basque Parliament
- In office 8 January 1987 – 18 December 1990
- Preceded by: José Antonio Maturana
- Succeeded by: Francisco José Ormazabal

First Secretary of the Basque Parliament
- In office 30 November 1983 – 8 January 1987
- Preceded by: José Antonio Zaldua Arbiza
- Succeeded by: Koro Garmendia Galbete

Personal details
- Born: 3 January 1931 San Sebastián, Gipuzkoa, Spain
- Died: 6 January 2017 (aged 86) San Sebastián, Gipuzkoa, Basque Country, Spain
- Party: PNV-EAJ

Joseba Andoni Leizaola Azpiazu (3 January 1931 – 6 January 2017) was a Spanish politician, Basque nationalist and member of the Basque Nationalist Party (PNV-EAJ). He was a member of the Basque Parliament for eighteen years from 1980 to 1998, including a tenure as the third President of the Basque Parliament from 18 December 1990 to 1 September 1998.

Leizaola was born in San Sebastián. He moved Venezuela in the early 1940s to escape the Francoist Spain government of Francisco Franco. His father, Ricardo Leizaola, was the founder of the El Día newspaper and the weekly newspaper. His uncle, Jesús María Leizaola was Lehendakari, or President, of the Basque-government-in-exile, from 1960 to 1978. Joseba Leizaola and his family lived in Venezuelan until the transition to democracy. He became active in the Basque exile and Basque-Venezuelan communities. Leizaola served as the President of PNV of Caracas and a member of the Basque Center of Caracas.

Leizaola became the leader of the Basque Nationalist Party's (PNV) Gipuzkoa provincial chapter during the Spanish transition to democracy. He then served as a member of both the Gipuzkoa Buru Batzar and the Euskadi Buru Batzar from 1968 to 1977.

In 1980, Leizaola was elected to the newly created Basque Parliament, where he served as an MP from 1980 to 1998. He served as the third President of the Basque Parliament from 18 December 1990 until 1 September 1998, when he was succeeded by Juan María Atutxa.

Joseba Leizaola died following a long illness on 6 January 2017, at the 86.
