= Isabel García Muñoz =

Spanish politician (born 1977)

Isabel García Muñoz MEP

Member of the European Parliament for Spain
- Incumbent
- Assumed office 2 July 2019

Personal details
- Born: 3 March 1977 (age 49) Zaragoza, Spain
- Party: Spanish Socialist Workers' Party

Isabel García Muñoz (pronounced [isaˈβel ɣaɾˈθi.a muˈɲoθ]; born 1977) is a Spanish politician who was elected as a Member of the European Parliament in 2019.

== Early life and career ==
Born on 3 March 1977 in Zaragoza, she completed studies in Telecommunications Engineering at the University of Zaragoza and also worked for the Institute for Engineering Research of Aragon's Department of Biomechanics.

== Political career ==
García became a municipal councillor of Muel in 2007 and a Member of the Cortes of Aragon in the 2015 national elections.

García, who ran 19th in the Spanish Socialist Workers' Party list for the 2019 European Parliament election in Spain, was elected MEP. She has been serving as vice-chair of the Committee on Budgetary Control and as member of the Committee on Transport and Tourism. Within the Committee on Transport and Tourism, she has been part of the Tourism Task Force (TTF).

In addition to her committee assignments, García is a member of the European Parliament Intergroup on Disability and the Spinelli Group.
