= Isabel Benjumea =

Spanish politician

Isabel Benjumea MEP
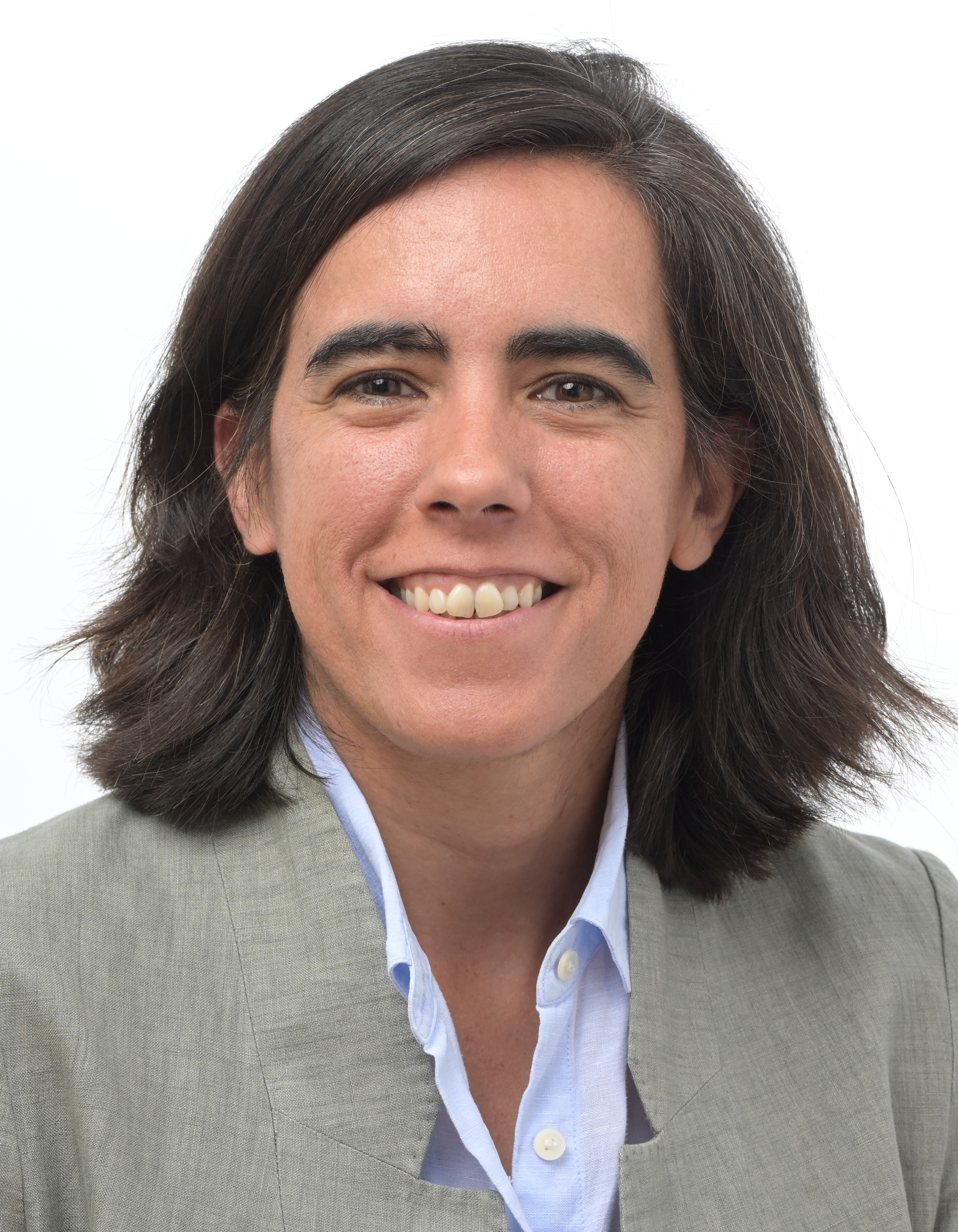

Member of the European Parliament for Spain
- Incumbent
- Assumed office 2 July 2019

Personal details
- Born: 5 September 1982 (age 43) Madrid, Spain
- Party: Spanish; People's Party; EU; European People's Party
- Occupation: businesswoman politician
- Profession: businesswoman politician

Isabel Benjumea Benjumea (pronounced [isaˈβel βeŋxuˈme.a]; born 5 September 1982) is a Spanish politician of the Popular Party (PP) who has been serving as Member of the European Parliament since 2019.

== Early life and career ==
Born on September 5, 1982, in Madrid, Benjumea graduated in law and international relations at Universidad Comillas (ICADE).

Benjumea spent her first year of professional career in Washington DC, where she worked at the World Bank implementing transparency and accountability programs for local governments in Latin America. Afterwards, she worked in the international relations department of FAES. It was in 2011 when she decided to undertake her first business project in the tourism sector, Greatness, which she directed until 2017.

In 2018 Benjumea joined as a partner of the strategic consulting firm IANUS Group. Currently, she teaches in the Entrepreneurship degree at Universidad Francisco Marroquín in Madrid.

== Political career ==
In 2019, Benjumea became part of the cabinet of President Pablo Casado as deputy head.

=== Member of the European Parliament, 2019–present ===
Since July 2019, Benjumea has been MEP after having been included as a candidate in number 10 of the PP list for the elections in the European Parliament of May 2019 in Spain. In parliament, she is vice president of the Committee on Regional Development, a member of the Committee on Economic and Monetary Affairs and a member of the delegations to the EU-Ukraine Parliamentary Association Committee and to the Euronest Parliamentary Assembly.

In addition to her committee assignments, Benjumea is also a member of the European Parliament Intergroup on Small and Medium-Sized Enterprises (SMEs) and the URBAN Intergroup.

== Other activities ==
Benjumea is co-founder of the Red Floridablanca, a liberal-conservative think-tank from which she published numerous articles in the Spanish press.
