= Juan María Atutxa =

President of the Basque Parliament

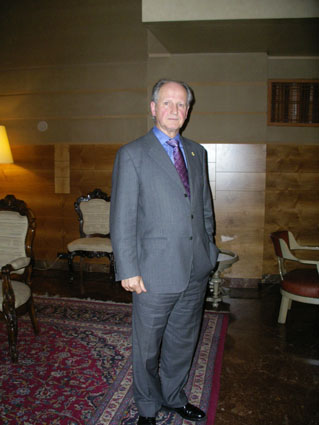

4th President of the Basque Parliament
- In office November 25, 1998 – May 16, 2005
- Preceded by: Joseba Leizaola
- Succeeded by: Izaskun Bilbao Barandica

Interior Minister of Basque Country
- In office March 31, 1980 – September 1, 1998
- President: José Antonio Ardanza
- Preceded by: Juan Lasa Jauregi
- Succeeded by: José Manuel Martiarena Lizarazu

Member of the Basque Parliament
- In office November 25, 1998 – October 4, 2005

Personal details
- Born: Juan María Atutxa Mendiola; May 18, 1941 (age 85) Areatza, Biscay, Spain
- Party: PNV-EAJ

Juan María Atutxa Mendiola (born May 18, 1941, in Areatza) is a politician from the Basque Country (an autonomous community in Spain) with a nationalist ideology. A member of the Basque Nationalist Party, he was Head of the Department of Interior (1991–98) and President of the Basque Parliament (1998–2005). He heads the Sabino Arana foundation.

== Head of the Department of Interior (1991-1998) ==
During his term as a regional minister, he was tasked with implementing the recently passed Basque Country Police Act which the regional police body (Ertzaintza) and mandated its extension to the whole autonomous community. Since then, the criminality rates in the Basque Country have consistently ranked among the lowest in Spain according to the data published each year by the office of the Spanish Attorney General. He also implemented the Emergency Response Act, a law unifying the protocols for emergency assistance in the Basque Country, and the Spectacles Act, which mandated periodic safety inspections on buildings authorized to hold public events.

Electoral regulations were also under his responsibility. In this area, he drafted the reform of the electoral law establishing the possibility of a future use of electronic voting and leaving the actual date of implementation to the Parliament. Furthermore, the Department of Interior introduced many technological advances during his tenure, greatly increasing the pace of the scrutiny and offering election night-data over the Internet, a first in Spain.

== President of the Basque Parliament (1998–2005) ==
In the 1998 election the Basque Nationalist Party renewed its ranks, dropping incumbent Lehendakari José Antonio Ardanza in favour of the younger, more nationalist-oriented Juan José Ibarretxe. The Presidency of the Parliament was also affected by this renovation, and incumbent President Joseba Andoni Leizaola handed over the chair to Mr. Atutxa. He stayed in office for two terms, but his third run for the head of the legislature after the 2005 election was blocked by the junior coalition partners of his party. After nine rounds of voting in a tie with the Socialist candidate Miguel Buen, he withdrew his candidacy and was replaced by his party colleague Izaskun Bilbao who won the vote.

== Overturned conviction ==
His tenure as president saw the enactment of the Spanish Political Parties Act, which sought to outlaw any party that did not condemn the violence of ETA; under this law, Batasuna was declared illegal by the Spanish Supreme Court, which considered that it had tangible links to ETA.

The reporting magistrate in the lawsuit was Manuel Marchena. Consequently, the court ordered the Parliament to disband the parliamentary group of the former party, Sozialista Abertzaleak, which, even though they would still be members of the Parliament, would have denied them the public money allotted to groups. Given that the standing rules of the Parliament did not contemplate the disbanding of parliamentary groups, the Basque nationalist majority in the Bureau considered that the Supreme Court's decision would require rules to be altered in order to meet it.

This started a chain of lawsuits in both the High Court of the Basque Country and the Spanish Supreme Court in which the three Bureau members were charged with an offence of contempt of court for their disobedience to a final ruling of the Supreme Court, which ignored its own Botín doctrine in order to prosecute the Basque MPs. After being initially acquitted on parliamentary immunity by the Basque High Court and an appeal by the far-right union Manos Limpias in 2007, founded by Miguel Bernard Remón, the Supreme Court sentenced him to a €18,000 fine and 18 months of disqualification for the exercise of any public office in early 2008.

In June 2017, the Strasbourg Tribunal of Human Rights condemned Spain for its irregular conviction of the Bureau members Juan Maria Atutxa, Conchi Bilbao and Gorka Knörr. Finally, eleven years on after his conviction by the Supreme Court, the same tribunal overturned it, clearing him and the MPs condemned in the same case of all offences, besides stating that the binding character of the Strasbourg tribunal's sentences for Spanish justice is "out of question".

== Criticism ==
In the political field he sternly confronted the violence of ETA, a decision that would make him a target for the group. He was criticized by some Spanish and Basque forces for refusing to break up the parliamentary group, despite not being qualified to make that decision. He said:

La manipulación y el engaño de determinadas formaciones políticas y algunos medios de comunicación llega al extremo de considerarme connivente con aquellos que precisamente tratan de segar mi vida. Se hace muy difícil llegar a la noche a mi casa llevando bajo el brazo un periódico que afirma cuanto antecede, y al mismo tiempo estar con mi servicio de seguridad planificando el horario y la ruta que hemos de seguir la mañana siguiente para llegar con vida al Parlamento Vasco.

Translation:

The manipulation and deception from certain political formations and mass media comes to the point of considering me an accomplice of those trying to reap my life. It is very hard for me to arrive at home at night carrying a newspaper asserting all of that, and at the same time have my security service plan the times and routes we shall take the next morning in order to arrive at the Basque Parliament alive.

== See also ==
- Arnaldo Otegi
- Altsasu incident (2016)
- Trial of Catalonia independence leaders

Political offices
| Preceded by Juan Lasa Jauregui | Basque Government; Head of the Department of Interior; 1991 - 1998 | Succeeded by Javier Balza |
| Preceded by Joseba Leizaola | President of the Basque Parliament; November 25, 1998 - May 16, 2005 | Succeeded by Izaskun Bilbao |
