= Rafaela Romero =

Spanish politician (born 1972)

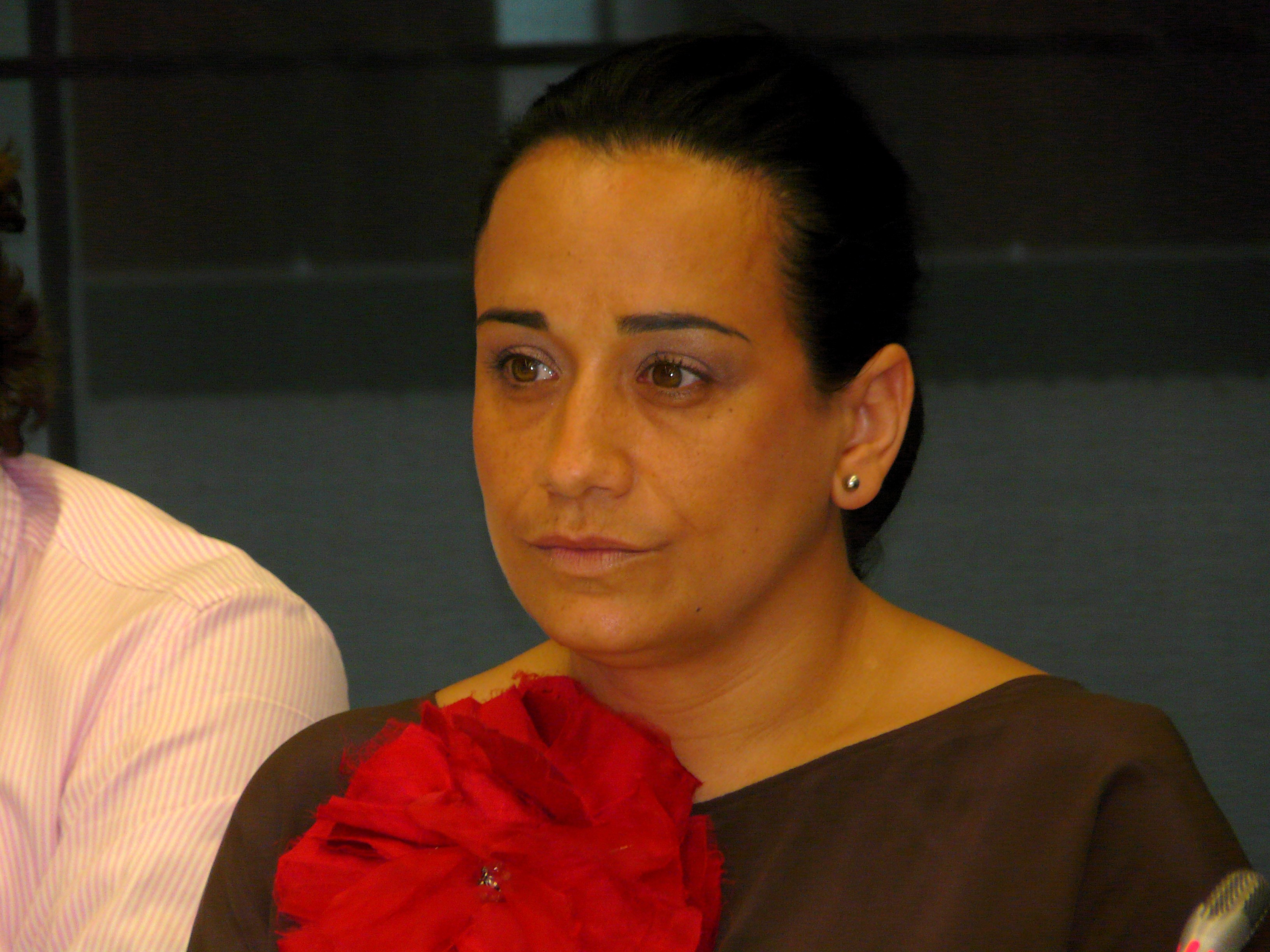
- Romero in 2011

Member of the Congress of Deputies
- Incumbent
- Assumed office 17 August 2023
- Constituency: Gipuzkoa

Personal details
- Born: 1 February 1972 (age 54)
- Party: Socialist Party of the Basque Country–Basque Country Left
- Spouse: Jesús Eguiguren

Rafaela Romero Pozo (born 1 February 1972) is a Spanish politician serving as a member of the Congress of Deputies since 2023. From 2007 to 2011, she served as president of the General Assembly of Gipuzkoa.
