= Wayfarers Gallery =

Former art gallery in New York City, USA

Coordinates: 40.6939629°N 73.930809°W

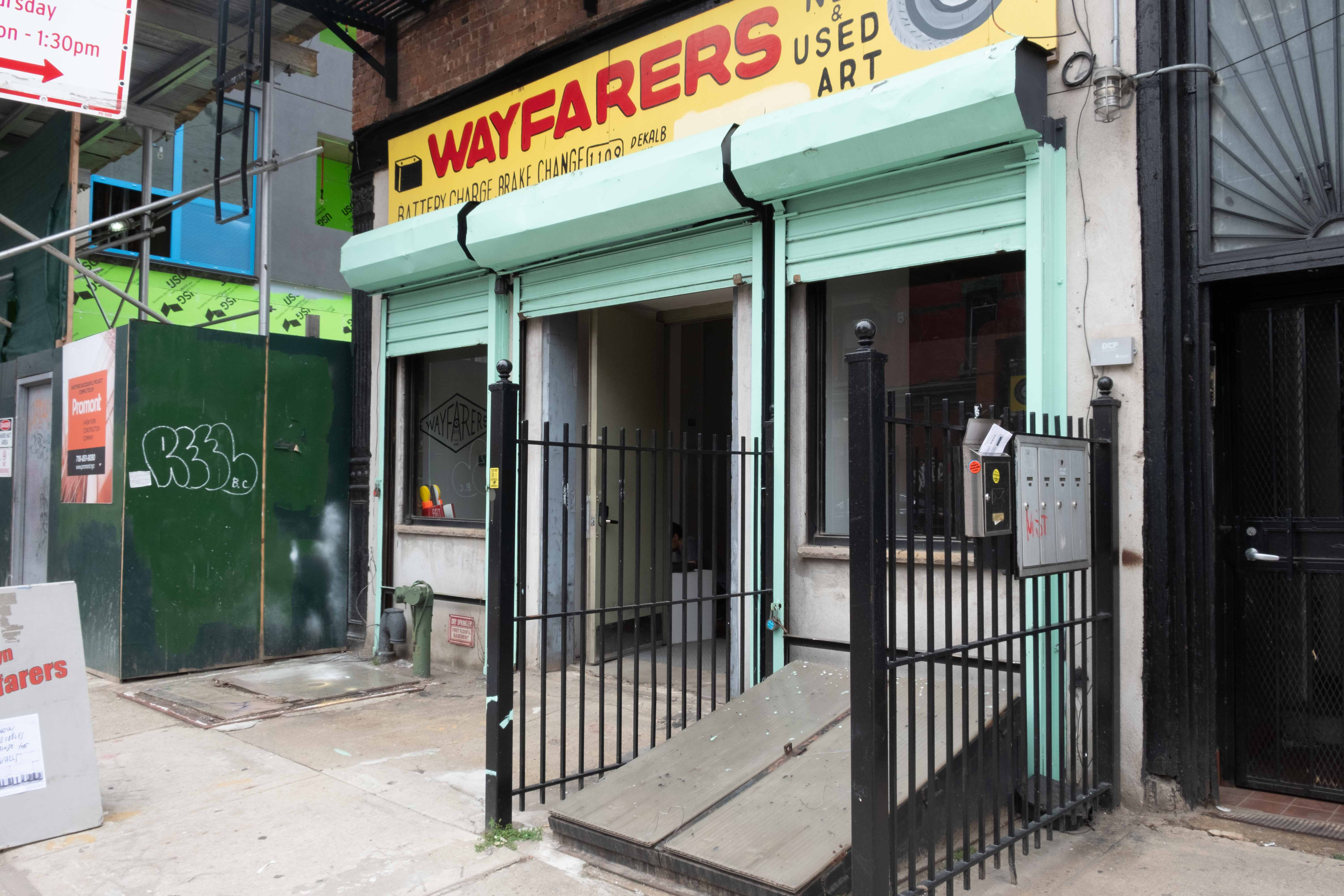
Wayfarers gallery and studio space on DeKalb Street, Brooklyn, New York (2018)

Exhibition ephemera. Announcement card (both sides) for 'havens.hangars,' a pop up exhibition at Wayfarers gallery in 2016.

Wayfarers was a non-profit studio program and art gallery in Bushwick, Brooklyn, New York founded by American artist George Ferrandi. The venue existed between 2011 and 2020 with a front gallery that faced DeKalb street that had rotating exhibitions, as well as studios for member artists, a commons area and additional exhibition space in the back. Wayfarers featured a wide range of programming including regular exhibitions by member and guest artists, pop-up exhibitions, performances, readings, editions, a summer artist-in-residence program, and an international exhibition exchange program.

== Exhibitions ==
Year	Title	Artists	Type of event	curator (if iapplicable)	Venue for exhibition (if part of artist exchange program)
2020	Ransom 2	417 artists	Exhibition		
2020	What we create may save us	Kate Alboreo, Yael Azoulay, Patty Barth, Claire Blanchette, Elisabeth Condon, George Ferrandi, Dave Frye, Tom Keating, Cynthia Mason, David McQueen, Maureen O'Leary, Kimberly Reinhardt, Cynthia Reynolds, Samantha Robinson, Jillian Rose, Jonathan Sims, Meredith Starr, and Elise Wunderlich	Exchange Program Exhibition	Cynthia Reynolds	Ejecta Projects, Carlisle, Pennsylvania
2019	Anthropocene Blues	Kate Alboreo, Yael Azoulay, Brian Davis, George Ferrandi, Cynthia Mason, Kharis Kennedy, Kate Kosek, David McQueen, Cynthia Reynolds, Maureen O’Leary, Meredith Starr and Elise Wunderlich.	Exhibition	Jane Ursula Harris	
2019	American Wilderness	Kate Alboreo, Patty Barth, Kharis Kennedy, Cynthia Mason, Maureen O'Leary, Meredith Starr	Exchange Program Exhibition		Art Lab Tokyo and Art Lab Akiba, Tokyo, Japan
2018	Transfer Queen	Patty Barth and A. W. Strouse	Exhibition		
2018	Blow Against the Walls	Antonello Ghezzi	Exhibitition		
2018	Lasciare la Terra	Kate Kosek, Maureen O'Leary, Macon Reed, and Samantha Robinson	Exchange Program Exhibition		Palazzina Liberty, Bologna, Italy
2016	havens.hangars	David Shaughnessy and Maureen O'Leary	Pop up exhibition	James Brittingham	
2015	Eulogy for the Dyke Bar	Macon Reed	Artist in Residence		

=== 2015 Eulogy for the Dyke Bar ===
In 2015, Chicago-based artist Macon Reed featured her installation art "Eulogy for the Dyke Bar" at Wayfarers. Composed of cardboard, plaster, and wood, it was a life-size depiction of a gay bar representing the declining phenomenon of the LGBT community. In March 2016, the exhibition was again featured in the Pulse Contemporary Art Fair.

== Exhibited Artists ==
Wayfarers has exhibited local and national artists including John Orth, Macon Reed, Christy Gast, David (Scout) McQueen, Hiroki Otsuka, Serra Victoria Bothwell Fels, Ryan Crowley, Charlotte Evans, and many more.
