= Juan José Pujana =

Spanish politician (1943–2022)

Juan José Pujana Arza (1943-2022) was a Spanish politician. He was the first President of the Basque Parliament, serving from 1980 to 1987. Pujana subsequently represented the Basque Autonomous Community in the Spanish Senate.
