= Estrella Durá =

Spanish psychologist and politician

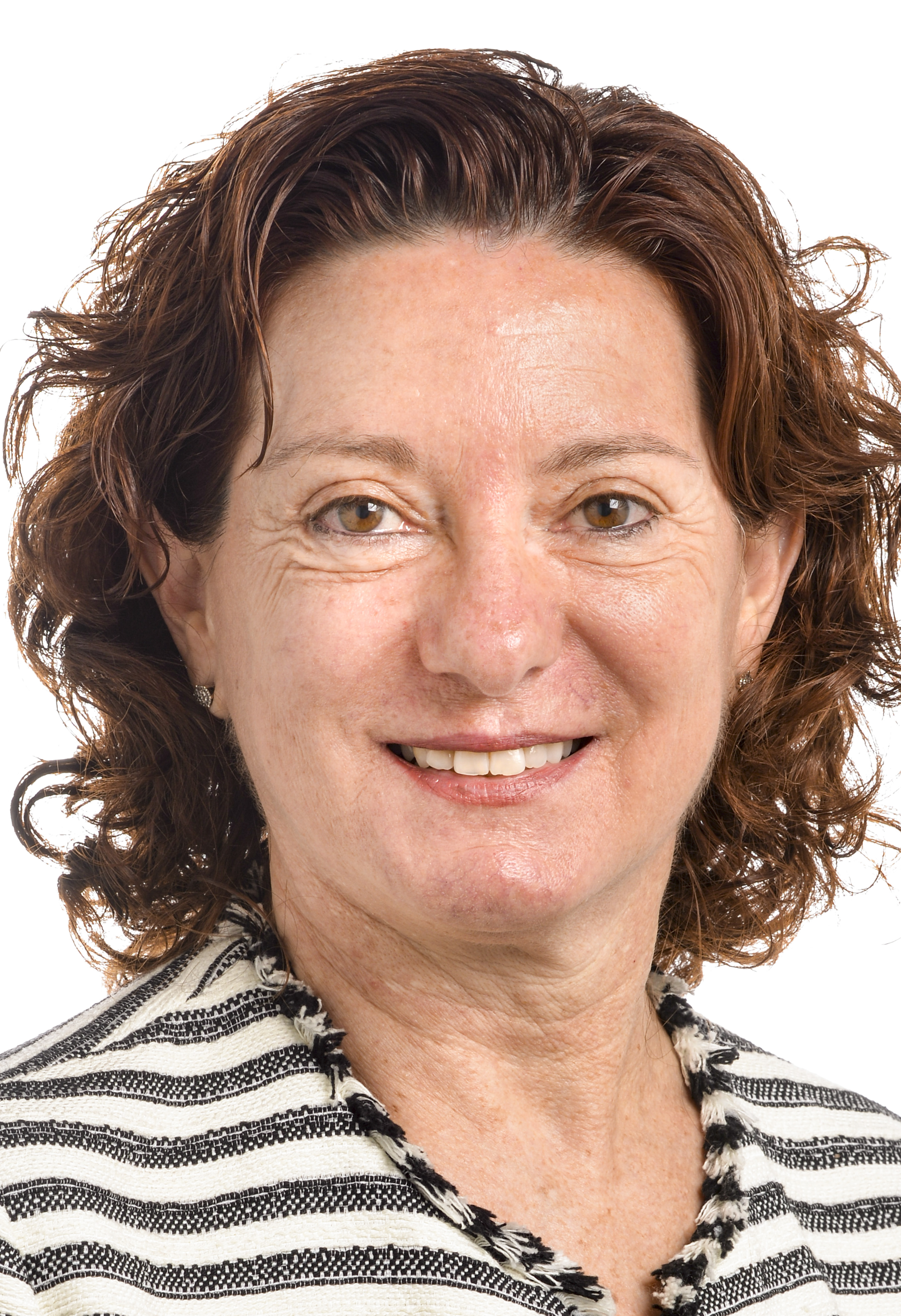

Member of the European Parliament
- Incumbent
- Assumed office 2 July 2019
- Constituency: Spain

Personal details
- Born: 22 September 1963 (age 63) Puçol, Spain
- Education: University of Valencia
- Occupation: Professor, researcher, politician

Estrella Durá Ferrandis (born 22 September 1963) is a Spanish Professor of Psychology at the University of Valencia and became a Member of the European Parliament in 2019 (9th legislature). She belongs to the Progressive Alliance of Socialists and Democrats (S&D) in the European Parliament and represents the Spanish Socialist Workers' Party (PSOE).

== Biography ==
=== Training and professional activity ===
Born in Puçol (Valencia) in 1963, she graduated in Psychology in 1986 from the University of Valencia, where she also obtained her doctorate in 1989. In 2004 she received her official title of Psychology Specialist in Clinical Psychology.

She has been a researcher at the Polibienestar Research Institute at the University of Valencia since 2006 and in 2017 became a full professor at the University of Valencia in the Department of Personality, Evaluation and Psychological Treatments.

As a visiting scientist she has collaborated with centres, institutes and universities in the USA, UK, Austria and the Netherlands. Her extensive list of scientific publications has earned her four times recognition by the National Commission for the Evaluation of Research Activity (sexenios).

Estrella Durá is an expert in social policy programmes with the main objective to increase the quality of life and social welfare of vulnerable groups. Some of the topics she has worked on include: unemployment in young people and people over 55, women and health, persons with functional diversity and persons with chronic illnesses, dependent elderly persons and migrants.

=== Networks and associations ===
Estrella Durá was a founding member of the non-profit organisation SEAS (Spanish Association of Social and Health Care) and was a member of the Board from 2003 until 2018. She was also a founding partner of GEOMETT (Geopolitics for the Development of Public Policies in the Mediterranean) and was the Secretary and member of the Board of the Spanish Society of Psycho-Oncology (SEPO) (2002–2007). She is currently a member of ENSA (European Network of Social Authorities) and ELISAN (European Local Inclusion & Social Action Network).

== Election and activity in the European Parliament ==
Estrella Durá ran 21st in the Spanish Socialist Workers' Party list for the 2019 European Parliament election. As the PSOE obtained 20 seats in the election, she was not among the 54 electees, but she became MEP at the beginning of the 9th legislative term, following the renouncement of the PSOE's head of list, Josep Borrell, to assume office, with the latter continuing as Foreign Minister instead. She joined the Progressive Alliance of Socialists and Democrats political group and became a member of the Committee on Employment and Social Affairs (EMPL).

POLITICAL PARTY: MEP of the Group of the Progressive Alliance of Socialists and Democrats in the European Parliament representing the Spanish Socialist Workers' Party (Spain)

COMMISSIONS: Member of the Committee on Employment and Social Affairs (EMPL) and Substitute of the Committee on Agriculture and Rural Development (AGRI)

DELEGATIONS: Member of the Delegation to the ACP-EU Joint Parliamentary Assembly (Africa Caribbean Pacific – European Union) and Substitute of the Delegation for relations with the countries of Southeast Asia (DASE) and the Association of Southeast Asian Nations (ASEAN)
