= George Ferrandi =

American artist

George Ferrandi (born June 17, 1967 in Baltimore, MD) is an American artist primarily known for her performance, installation and participatory projects that address issues of vulnerability, impermanence, fallibility and spectacle, often through experimental approaches to narrative. Her work is known for employing a unique humor and deep sense of humanity.

In 2011, Ferrandi founded the studio program and art gallery Wayfarers in Bushwick, Brooklyn, New York.

Ferrandi’s works operate at the intersections of performance, sculpture, and theater. She uses staged and improvised interventions to explore her interests in how gestures alter perception of space and how narrative is used as a tool to sculpt time.

== Art ==
=== Documenta 15 (2022) ===
Ferrandi's Jump!Star: Simmering, a Vienna-based Constellate that moved online at the beginning of the pandemic, was featured in Documenta 15 in a presentation by Brunnenpassage at Instituto Internacional de Artivismo "Hannah Arendt." A rope woven by Constellate participants from different parts of the world during lockdown served as the setting for the workshop as well as a materialized example of collaborative approaches in the arts.

=== George’s Lovely Variety (2021) ===
Since January 2021, Ferrandi has been publishing George’s Lovely Variety, a subscription-based monthly project usually in the form of newspaper of drawings and writings delivered to readers through the USPS.

=== Jump!Star (2015) ===
Since 2015, Ferrandi has been developing Jump!Star, an initiative that unites communities, scientists, artists and arts organizations in researching and ritualizing how future generations might celebrate the end of Polaris’ reign as Earth’s North Star. The project takes the form of a series of socially engaged, science-centered projects called “Constellates” that use cultural imagination as raw material. Ferrandi works with a core team of collaborators including artist Alan Calpe, musicians Mirah, Jee Young Sim and Jherek Bischoff, scientists Jana Grcevich and Sonali McDermid, and ethnomusicologist Dina Bennet.

Constellates have been developed with communities around the US through Harvester Arts, Wichita State University, University of Mary Washington, Penn State, and Wheaton College and in Europe through Brunnenpassage and the Weltmuseum Wien.

Jump!Star is named in honor of astronomer Annie Jump Cannon, the American scientist credited with establishing the contemporary star classification system.

=== Synchronized Sound Plays ===
Ferrandi’s “Synchronized Sound Plays” are an ongoing series of live mediations performed around a table for and with small audiences. Participants wear headsets and are each hearing different but carefully synchronized stories and instructions, so that they become actors in the play, as well as audience members. Throughout, Ferrandi places and removes objects on the table in front of them that shape each listener’s narrative differently, depending on which story they are hearing. The experience is performed with rotating audiences many times over the course of the exhibition.

“OK. don’t look at the stranger…” premiered in 2012 at Wayfarers in Brooklyn for rotating audiences of two. “let me get this out of your way….” was developed and premiered at Harvester Arts in Wichita, Kansas, in 2014 for rotating audiences of two. Star!Star!Star!Circle premiered in 2015 on the roof of the International House of Japan in Tokyo and was performed in Japanese and English for rotating audiences of eight.

=== The Prosthetics of Joy (2014) ===
First developed at the Laupahoehoe Cultural Residency Program, "The Prosthetics of Joy" was performed at University of Alabama Abroms-Engel Institute for the Visual Art and archived on Blackbird online journal of literature and the arts. The artist recreated a photograph with a live performance. The photo is of 30 children at a bar mitzvah dressed as adults. In the performance, adults are supported by sculptures in exact mid-jump locations, playing the parts of the children. The sculptural prosthetics fit the player's bodies, being custom made in the weeks leading up to the event.

=== It Felt Like I Knew You (2012) ===
Ferrandi would ride the New York City Subway in the evening. When someone sat next to her, she embarked on a mental experiment of "resculpting" the space between herself and her fellow passenger, attempting to change what she considered stiff and guarded space into soft yielding space, then resting her head on the passenger's shoulder.

=== Wherever There Is Water (2010) ===
Developed in conjunction with Fleisher Art Memorial, Philadelphia, wherever There Is Water was an experimental narrative told in the form of a procession. Ferrandi wrote a fictional story about Huberta, an elderly Coney Island woman trying to walk back to her old life. During the event, several hundred people walked through South Philly carrying illuminated sculptures and paper lanterns created at workshops hosted at Fleisher, while a chorus sang songs Ferrandi had composed to narrate Huberta's travels.

=== In Lieu of Flowers (2005) ===
An installation at Cinders Gallery in Brooklyn and Covivant Gallery in Tampa, described by Holland Cotter of the New York Times as "an odd, moving show, in which a single piece, a larger-than-life-size sculpture of a man, stands out." The figure is a portrait of George's father, who was recently deceased.

=== Cloud Seeding Circus of the Performative Object (2002-1999) ===
Cloud Seeding Circus was a touring performance project produced collaboratively by ten visual artists. A mobile installation, exhibition space and vehicle for performance, the compact caravan arrived in towns and art venues to give live performances out of their mobile stage. Cloud Seeding referenced the traditional circus but operated within the traditions of sculpture, video, installation, and performance art as a contemporary circus project. The project toured from 1999-2002. It was profiled in Freaks and Fire: The Underground Reinvention of Circus by J. Dee Hill.
