= List of presidents of the Basque Parliament =

Presidents of parliament in Basque country in Northern Spain

President of the Basque Parliament
- Eusko Legebiltzarreko Lehendakaria
- Flag of the Basque Country

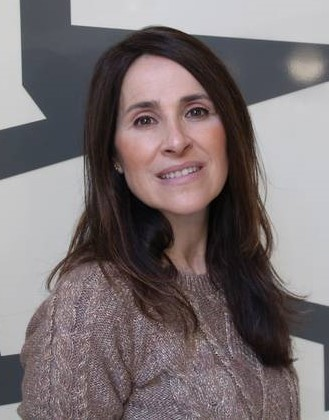
- Incumbent; Bakartxo Tejeria since 20 November 2012
- Member of: Basque Parliament
- Formation: 31 March 1980
- First holder: Juan José Pujana
- Website: legebiltzarra.eus

This article lists the presidents of the Basque Parliament, the presiding officers of the regional legislature of the Basque Country.

== List ==
No.	Name	Portrait	Party	Took office	Left office	^{Legs.}	^{Refs.}
1	Juan José Pujana		EAJ/PNV (Note: Pujana joined EA on 21 September 1986 and continued as a member of the Mixed Group for the rest of the parliamentary term.)	31 March 1980	22 March 1984	1st	
1	Juan José Pujana		EAJ/PNV	22 March 1984	8 January 1987	2nd	
2	Jesús Eguiguren		PSE–EE	8 January 1987	18 December 1990	3rd	
3	Joseba Leizaola		EAJ/PNV	18 December 1990	30 August 1994	4th	
3	Joseba Leizaola		EAJ/PNV	30 August 1994	25 November 1998	5th	
4	Juan María Atutxa		EAJ/PNV	25 November 1998	8 June 2001	6th	
4	Juan María Atutxa		EAJ/PNV	8 June 2001	16 May 2005	7th	
5	Izaskun Bilbao		EAJ/PNV	23 May 2005	3 April 2009	8th	
6	Arantza Quiroga Cía		PP	3 April 2009	19 November 2012	9th	
7	Bakartxo Tejeria		EAJ/PNV	20 November 2012	21 October 2016	10th	
7	Bakartxo Tejeria		EAJ/PNV	21 October 2016	3 August 2020	11th	
7	Bakartxo Tejeria		EAJ/PNV	3 August 2020	4 May 2024	12th	
7	Bakartxo Tejeria		EAJ/PNV	14 May 2024	Incumbent	13th	
