= Arantza Quiroga Cía =

Spanish politician (born 1973)

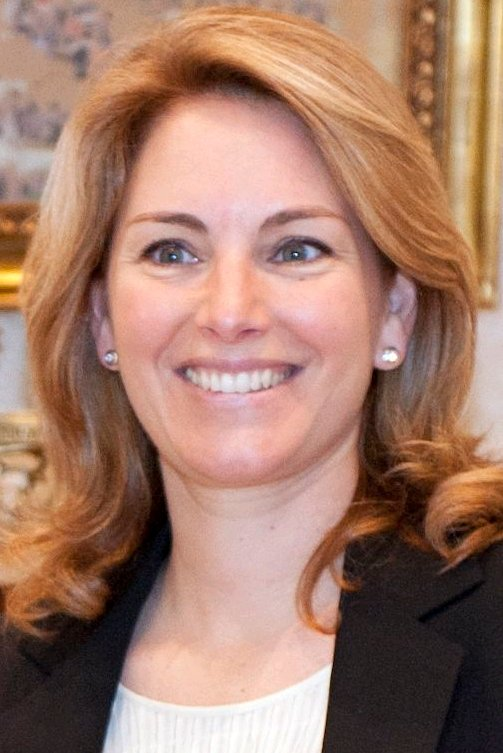

Arantza Quiroga Cía (Irún, 26 July 1973) is a Spanish politician. She was President of the Basque Parliament between 2009 and 2012, an office commonly known in the Anglophone world by the name of "Speaker of the Parliament". Mrs. Quiroga, who has a degree in Law, is a member of the conservative People's Party (PP) and was the leader of the Basque branch of the party until she resigned in 2015.

Born to a father from Valladolid and a Basque mother, she grew up in Irún. She became a member of the Spain-wide People's Party youth movement Nuevas Generaciones at 21 and was elected a local councillor for Irún on the party list. Her political career began to take off three years later, when she gave a speech at a party meeting in Madrid regarding the 20th anniversary of the first democratic elections.

Quiroga was first elected to the Basque Parliament in the 1998 election for the constituency of Gipuzkoa, and has since had a continuous presence in the chamber (she lost her seat in the 2001 election, but entered parliament because fellow PP MP María San Gil resigned her Gipuzkoa seat shortly after the election). On virtue of a deal between her party and the PSE-EE after the 2009 election, the conservatives announced that she would be their candidate for President of the Basque Parliament. She was elected as Speaker on 3 April 2009, and formally opened the new Parliament with a speech mixing Basque and Spanish.

Political offices
Preceded by Izaskun Bilbao	President of the Basque Parliament; April 3, 2009–November 20, 2012	Succeeded by Bakartxo Tejeria
Assembly seats
Preceded by Title jointly held	Member of the Basque Parliament for Guipúzcoa; November 25, 1998–March 20, 2001	Succeeded by Title jointly held
Preceded by Title jointly held	Member of the Basque Parliament for Guipúzcoa; November 31, 2001–Present	Incumbent
