= Izaskun Bilbao Barandica =

Basque politician

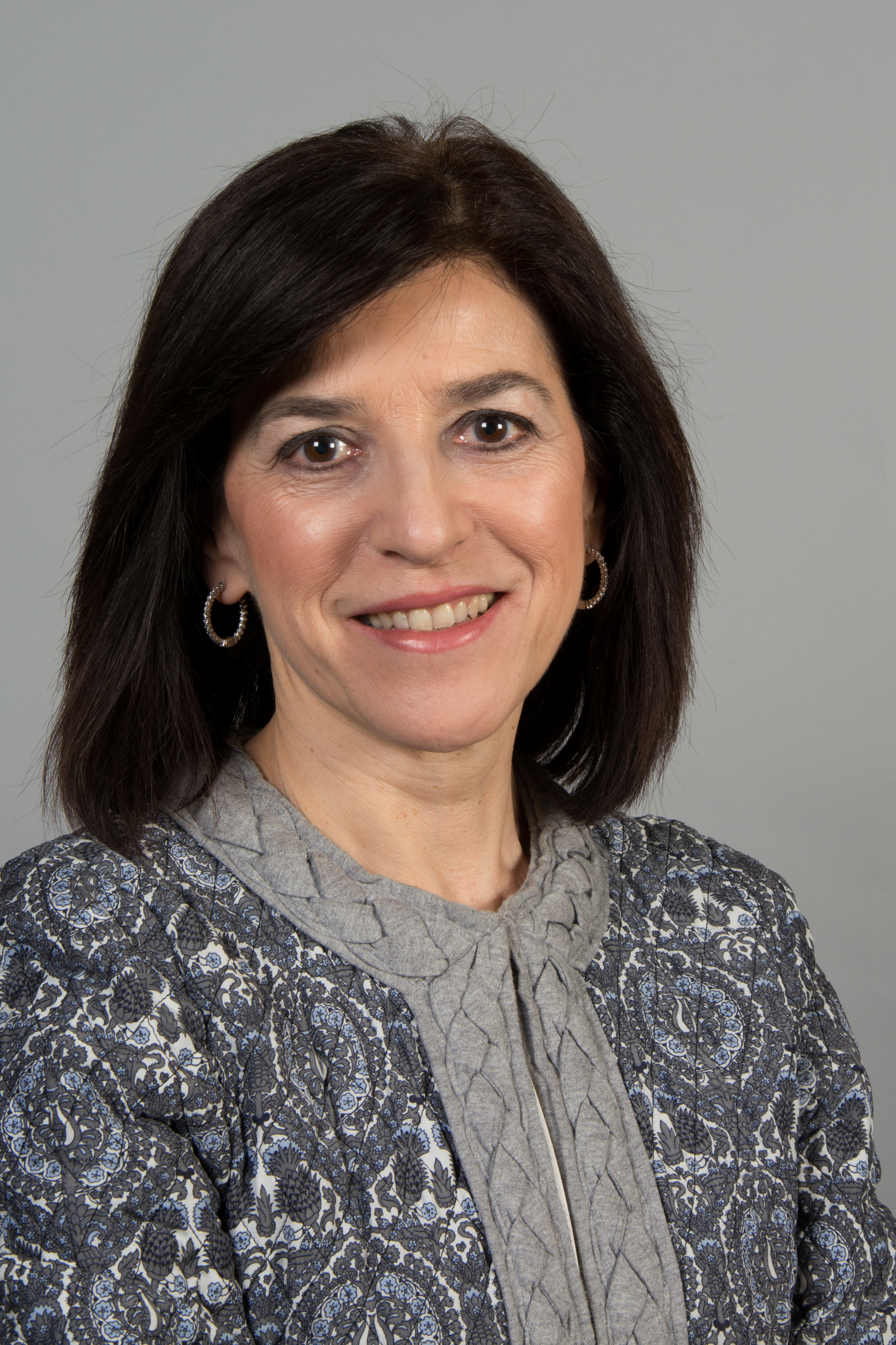
- I. Bilbao in 2014
- Born: 27 March 1961 (age 65); Bermeo
- Political party: Basque Nationalist Party

Izaskun Bilbao Barandica (born 27 March 1961 in Bermeo) is a politician from the Basque Country, a region in Spain. She was the President of the Basque Parliament from 2005 to 2009, being the first woman to hold the position. She has been a Member of the European Parliament since 2009. She is affiliated with the Basque National Party, which belongs to the European Democratic Party, and sits in the Renew Europe group in the European Parliament.

== Life and career ==
Izaskun Bilbao was born in the coastal town of Bermeo in the Basque region of north west Spain. She is a member of the Basque Nationalist Party.

=== President of the Basque Parliament, 2005–2009 ===
Izaskun Bilbao was the President of the Basque Parliament in the 2005–2009 term, being elected to the office as a "consensus candidate" among the nationalist majority in the legislature when the incumbent president and initial candidate of her party, Juan María Atutxa, failed to obtain the majority and the election deadlocked. She has a degree in law.

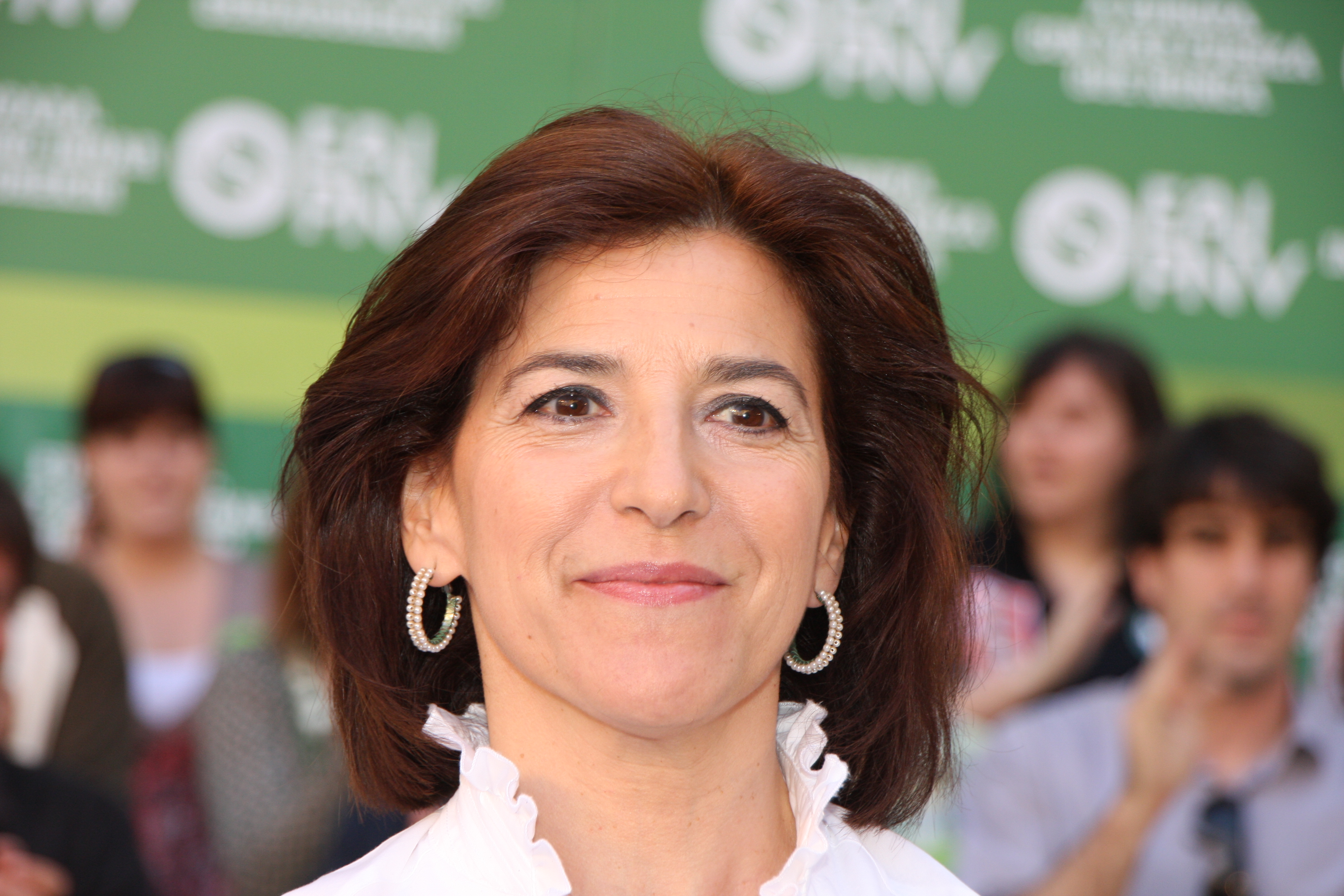
Izaskun Bilbao, the first woman to hold the Presidency of the Basque Parliament

In 2008, she was in the center of a controversy regarding the placement of the Spanish flag in the seat of the Basque Parliament: the Spanish Law on Flags requires that all public institutions place the Spanish flag on a prominent place wherever the regional or local flags fly. After years of not submitting to such law and flying only the Ikurriña (Basque flag), the Spanish Supreme Court ruled that the Basque Parliament would have to fly the Spanish flag too. In the Bureau meeting that studied the ruling, Izaskun Bilbao sided with the non-nationalist minority in the Parliament ruling body to actually place the flag against the official policy of her party. She defended this decision as simply obeying the final ruling of the Supreme Court, and thus having nothing to do with politics.

Bilbao contested the 2009 election as the leading candidate for Biscay in the Basque National Party's ticket, and was subsequently re-elected to parliament. She also sought re-election as speaker, but the election results allowed PSE and PP to form a majority, and Arantza Quiroga (PP) succeeded her in the post. Bilbao resigned as member of parliament during the summer of 2009, upon being elected by her party to contest the 2009 European Parliament election.

=== Member of the European Parliament, 2009–present ===
Izaskun Bilbao has been a Member of the European Parliament since the 2009 European elections. She served as vice-chairwoman of the Alliance of Liberals and Democrats for Europe Group under the leadership of chairman Guy Verhofstadt until 2019, when Luis Garicano was elected as vice-chairman. She is also a member of the Committee on Transport and Tourism. In this capacity, she has been the parliament's rapporteur on the interoperability of the rail system within the EU. She is also a member of the Democracy Support and Election Coordination Group (DEG), which oversees the Parliament's election observation missions.

In addition to her committee assignments, Izaskun Bilbao is a member of the European Parliament Intergroup on LGBT Rights and the MEPs Against Cancer group.

Izaskun Bilbao has given speeches in the European Parliament in support of freedom of expression in Vietnam and for female entrepreneurship. She has supported the criticism of Josu Jon Imaz, former EAJ-PNV president and current CEO of Spanish petrochemical company Repsol, against the EU focus on decarbonization and electrification.

Preceded by Juan María Atutxa	President of the Basque Parliament; 23 May 2005 - 3 April 2009	Succeeded by Arantza Quiroga
