= Aizarnazabal =

- Municipality
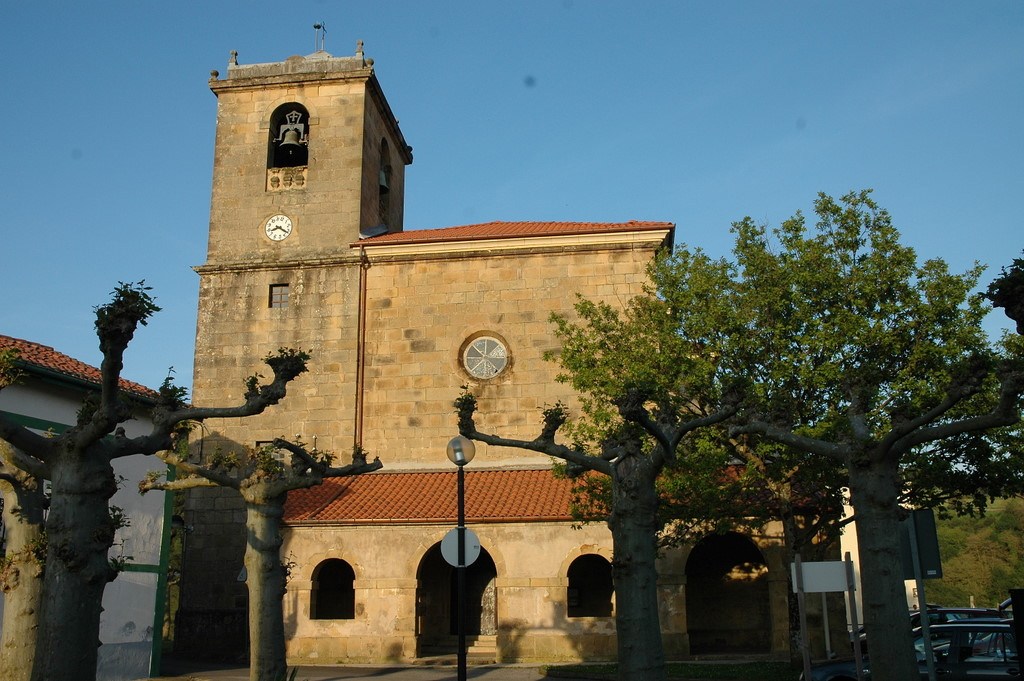

- Coat of arms

- Location of Aizarnazabal within the Basque Autonomous Community
- Coordinates: 43°15′21″N 2°14′11″W
- Country: Spain
- Autonomous community: Basque Country
- Province: Gipuzkoa
- Comarca: Urola Kosta
- Founded: 1845

Government
  - Mayor: María Carmen Arregi Agirre (EH Bildu)

Area
  - Total: 6.55 km^{2} (2.53 sq mi)
- Elevation: 58 m (190 ft)

Population (2025-01-01)
  - Total: 822
  - Density: 125/km^{2} (325/sq mi)
- Demonym: Basque: aizarnazabaldarra
- Time zone: UTC+1 (CET)
  - Summer (DST): UTC+2 (CEST)
- Postal code: 20280
- Website: Official website

Aizarnazabal is a town located in the province of Gipuzkoa, in the autonomous community of Basque Country, in the north of Spain. As of 2014 it had a total population of 775 inhabitants.
