= Bernat =

Bernat may refer to:

== People ==
=== Given name ===
- Bernat Calbó (c. 1180–1243), Catalan jurist, bureaucrat, monk, bishop, and soldier
- Bernat Fenollar (1438–1516), Valencia poet, cleric and chess player
- Bernat Francés y Caballero, Spanish Roman Catholic bishop
- Bernat Guillem d'Entença (died 1237), Spanish noble
- Bernat Joan i Marí (born 1960), Spanish politician
- Bernat Klein (1922–2014), Serbian textile designer and painter
- Bernat Manciet (1923–2005), French writer
- Bernat Martínez (1980–2015), Spanish motorcycle racer
- Bernat Martorell (died 1452), Catalan painter
- Bernat Metge (c. 1340–1413), Catalan writer
- Bernat de Palaol (fl. 1386), Catalan troubador and merchant
- Bernat Pomar (1932–2011), Mallorcan composer and violinist
- Bernat Quintana (born 1986), Spanish actor
- Bernat Rosner (born 1932), Hungarian-born American lawyer and concentration camp survivor
- Bernat Sanjuan (1915–1979), Spanish painter
- Bernat Solé (born 1975), Catalan politician
- Bernat Soria (born 1951), Spanish scientist

=== Surname ===
- Enric Bernat (businessman) (1923–2003), Spanish businessman
- Enric Bernat Lunar (born 1997), Spanish footballer
- Hans Christian Bernat (born 2000), Danish footballer
- Hugo Eyre Bernat (born 1994), Spanish footballer
- Ján Bernát (born 2001), Slovak footballer
- Jeff Bernat (born 1989), Filipino-American singer
- Juan Bernat (born 1993), Spanish footballer
- Martín Bernat (fl. 1450–1505), Aragonese painter
- Miguel Bernat (born 1957), Argentine chess master
- Robert Bernat (1931–1994), American composer
- Víctor Bernat (born 1987), Andorran footballer

== Places ==
- Bernat, Iran, in Mazandaran Province

== See also ==
- Bernard (disambiguation)
