= Barnard =

Barnard is a surname of Old English origin, derived from the Anglo-Saxon given name "Beornheard". It is composed of two elements: "Beorn," meaning "young warrior" or "bear," and "heard," meaning "hardy," "brave," or "strong." In some cases, Barnard is a version of the surname Bernard, which is a French and West Germanic masculine given name and surname. The surname means as tough as a bear, Bar(Bear)+nard/hard(hardy/tough)

== People ==
Some of the people bearing the surname Barnard in England are thought to have arrived after the time of the Norman Conquest (1066), Changing their surnames from Bernard to Barnard. Some of whom, it has been suggested, can be traced back to Hugo Bernard. Some of the Barnard family in England may have been Huguenots who fled from the Atlantic coast region of France circa 1685 (the time of the revocation of the edict of Nantes) or earlier than that date. By contrast, the Barnard family in Holland (the western provinces of the Netherlands) can be definitively traced back to circa 1751 (Izaak Barnard) of Scheveningen.The surname Barnard is also found in South Africa among the Afrikaner community. An example of this is Christiaan Barnard, A South African Cardiac Surgeon who performed the first Successful Heart Transplant.The surname is Also found in Australia and North America because of mostly UK and Huguenot immigration from Europe. Other families bearing or subsequently adopting the surname Barnard arrived as Jewish immigrants from continental Europe after 1656 and are well documented. Some of the latter branch are descendants of Rabbi Daniel Barnard of Canterbury, with recorded descendants around London, Chatham, Dartford, Kingston upon Hull, Stockton-on-Tees, Bournemouth, Ipswich, Norwich and in Australia.

=== Surname ===
In England the surname is most commonly found in Greater London and the South Eastern counties (most common occurrences are in Essex, East Sussex, Kent and Suffolk). And in the United States of America it is most commonly found in California, Texas, Florida, and New York. It is also found in France, Belgium, Canada, The Netherlands, South Africa, Australia, and occasionally in Germany. The first syllable of the name derives from bear; Bär or Baer in German. corresponding family names are BAER, BER, BERR, BEHR, BERNHARDT, BERNARD (in France).

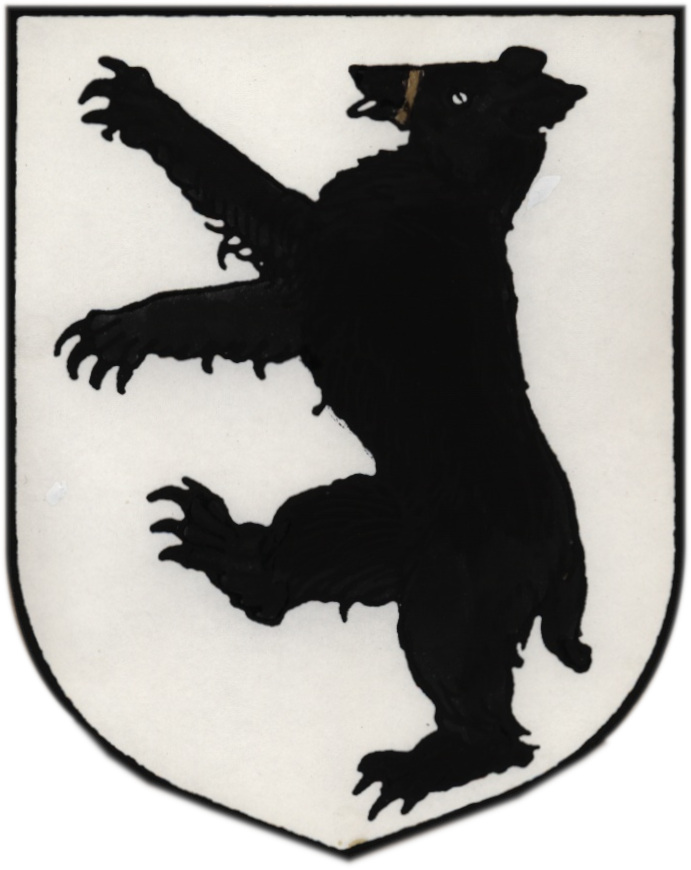
Barnard Coat of Arms Argent, bear rampant sable, muzzle or

== People with the surname ==
- Barnard (surname)

== Given name ==
- Bernard Courtois (also spelled Barnard Courtois), (1777–1838), French chemist
- Barnard E. Bee Sr. (1787–1853), early settler and political leader in the Republic of Texas
- Barnard Elliott Bee Jr. (1824–1861), Confederate Army general during the American Civil War
- Barnard Pananasky, a pseudonym of Gary Morgan (actor)
- M. Barnard Eldershaw, Australian literary pseudonym

== Schools ==
- Barnard Castle School
- Barnard College
- Barnard School South Hampton

== Places ==
- Barnard, Kansas
- Barnard, Michigan
- Barnard, Missouri
- Barnard, South Dakota
- Barnard, Vermont
- Barnard Castle, England
- Barnard River
- Barnardsville, North Carolina
- Mount Barnard

== See also ==
- Baron Barnard, English title
- Barnardo (surname list)
- Barnes (name)
- Barnett (name list)
- Barney (disambiguation)
- Barnhart (surname list)
- Barrett (clan)
- Bernard (disambiguation)
- Bernardakis (surname list)
- Bernhard (disambiguation)
