= 2004 European Parliament election in Spain =

- 13 June 2004

All 54 (Note: Note that while the Treaty of Nice initially allocated 50 seats to Spain, it provided for a total European Parliament size of 732 which—as a result of Bulgaria and Romania not accessing the European Union until 2007—allowed for Spain to be awarded four additional seats, which it maintained for the entire 2004–2009 term.) Spanish seats in the European Parliament
- Opinion polls
- Registered: 34,706,044 ▲2.6%
- Turnout: 15,666,491 (45.1%) ▼17.9 pp
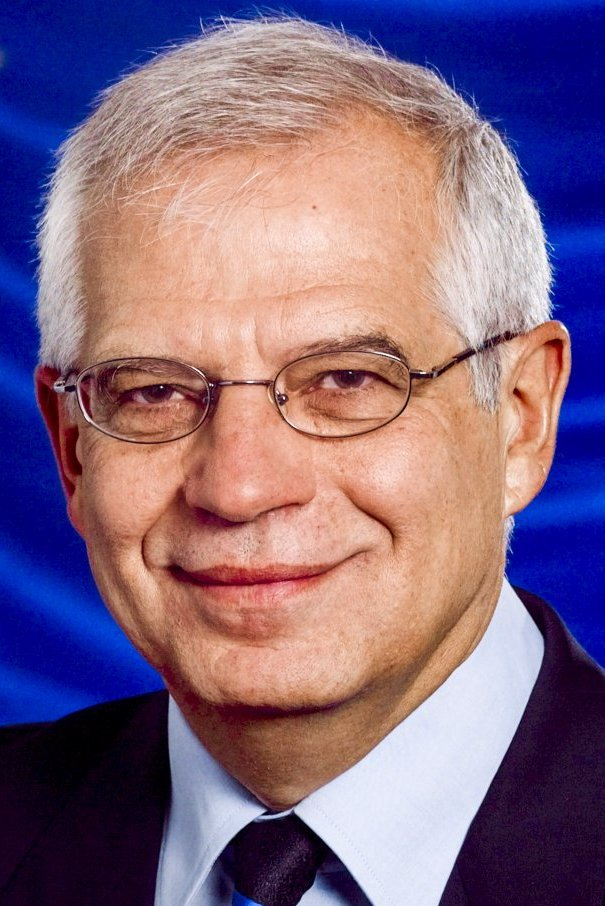

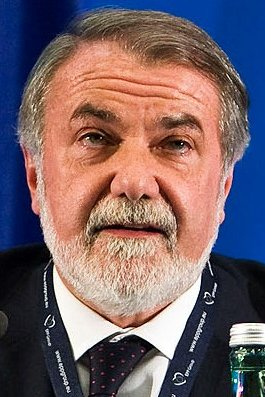

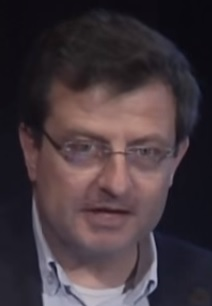

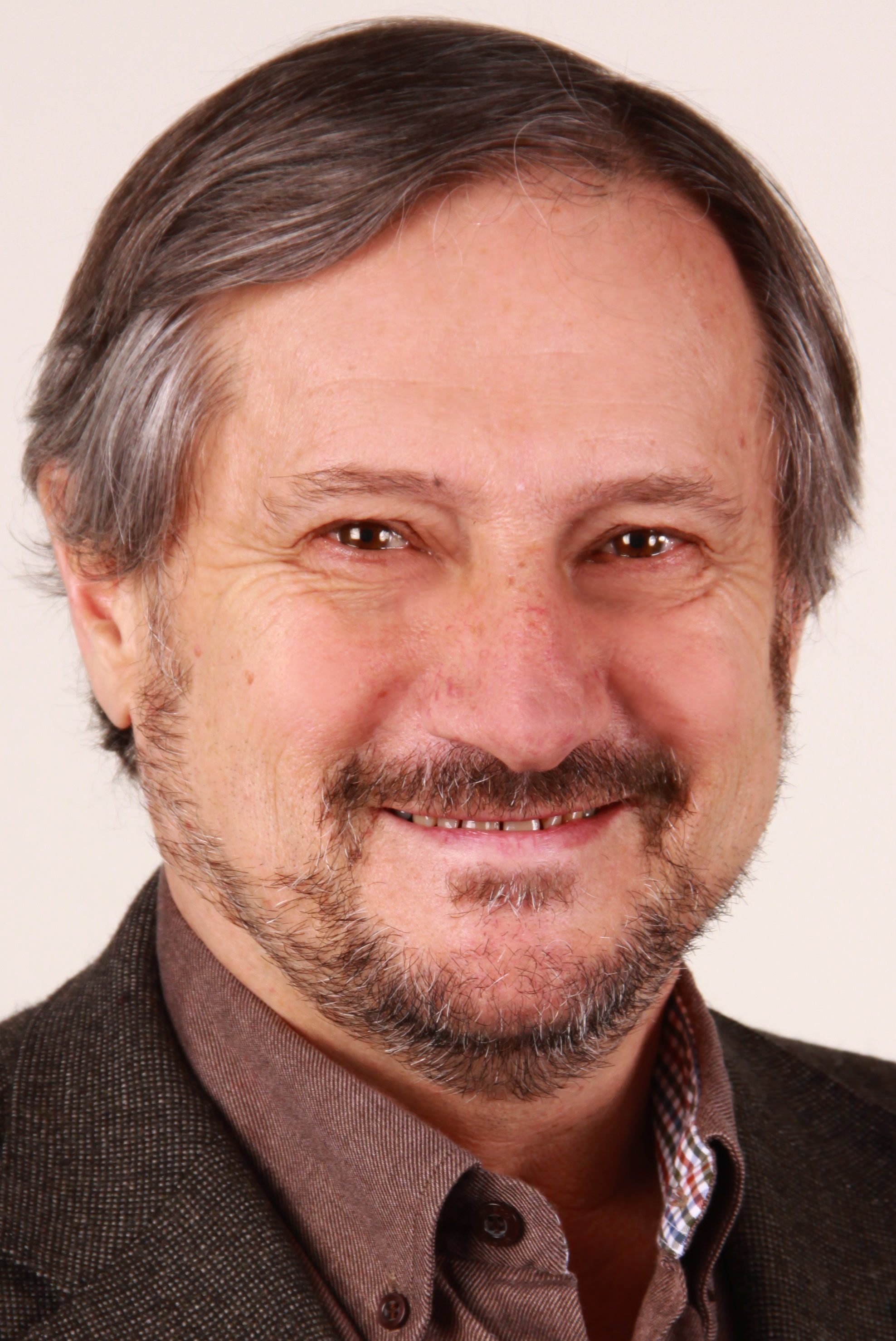

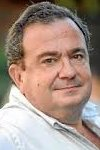

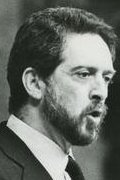
	First party	Second party	Third party
Leader	Josep Borrell	Jaime Mayor Oreja	Ignasi Guardans
Party	PSOE	PP	Galeusca
Alliance	PES	EPP–ED	ELDR (ALDE); EPP
Leader since	2 May 2004	22 April 2004	18 January 2004
Leader's seat	Spain	Spain	Spain
Last election	24 seats, 35.3%	27 seats, 39.7%	4 seats, 8.0% (Note: Results for CiU (4.4%, 3 seats), CN–EP in the Basque Country and Navarre (1.9%, 0 seats), and BNG (1.6%, 1 seat) in the 1999 election.)
Seats won	25	24	2
Seat change	▲1	▼3	▼2
Popular vote	6,741,112	6,393,192	798,816
Percentage	43.5%	41.2%	5.1%
Swing	▲8.2 pp	▲1.5 pp	▼2.9 pp
	Fourth party	Fifth party	Sixth party
Leader	Willy Meyer	Bernat Joan	Alejandro Rojas-Marcos
Party	IU–ICV–EUiA	Europe of the Peoples	CE
Alliance	GUE/NGL; Greens/EFA	Greens/EFA	ELDR (ALDE); Greens/EFA
Leader since	8 May 2004	17 April 1999	2004
Leader's seat	Spain	Spain	Spain
Last election	4 seats, 6.5% (Note: Results for IU–EUiA (5.8%, 4 seats) and LV–IP in Catalonia (0.7%, 0 seats) in the 1999 election.)	2 seats, 1.1% (Note: Results for CN–EP, not including the Balearic Islands, the Basque Country and Navarre (0.9%, 2 seats), LV–IP in Aragon (0.2%, 0 seats) and Andecha Astur (0.0%, 0 seats) in the 1999 election.)	2 seats, 3.4% (Note: Results for CE (3.2%, 2 seats), CN–EP in the Balearic Islands (0.1%, 0 seats), EU (0.1%, 0 seats) and PAS (0.1%, 0 seats) in the 1999 election.)
Seats won	2	1	0
Seat change	▼2	▼1	▼2
Popular vote	643,136	380,709	197,231
Percentage	4.1%	2.5%	1.3%
Swing	▼2.4 pp	▲1.4 pp	▼2.1 pp

An election was held in Spain on 13 June 2004 as part of the concurrent EU-wide election to the 6th European Parliament. All 54 seats allocated to the Spanish constituency as per the Treaty of Nice were up for election.

The election saw a close race between the centre-left Spanish Socialist Workers' Party (PSOE), which had accessed power earlier in April in the wake of the 11M train bombings leading up to the 14 March general election, and the centre-right People's Party (PP), still reeling from its election defeat. It marked the only time the PSOE emerged as the largest party in a European Parliament election in Spain between 1989 and 2019. It also saw a considerable drop in turnout down to 45.1%, the lowest up until that point—a figure that would be outmatched by the turnout in the two subsequent European Parliament elections, 2009 (44.9%) and 2014 (43.8%).

== Overview ==
=== Electoral system ===
Voting for the European Parliament in Spain was based on universal suffrage, which comprised all Spanish nationals and resident non-national European citizens over 18 years of age with full political rights, provided that they had not been deprived of the right to vote by a final sentence, nor were legally incapacitated.

54 European Parliament seats were allocated to Spain as per the Treaty of Nice. All were elected in a single multi-member constituency—comprising the entire national territory—using the D'Hondt method and closed-list proportional voting, with no electoral threshold. The use of this electoral method resulted in an effective threshold depending on district magnitude and vote distribution.

The law did not provide for by-elections to fill vacant seats; instead, any vacancies arising after the proclamation of candidates and during the legislative term were filled by the next candidates on the party lists or, when required, by designated substitutes.

=== Outgoing delegation ===
The table below shows the composition of the Spanish delegation in the chamber at the time of the election call.

Delegation composition in May 2004
Groups	Parties	MEPs	
Groups	Parties	Seats	Total
European People's Party–European Democrats	PP	26	28
European People's Party–European Democrats	UPN	1	28
European People's Party–European Democrats	UDC	1	28
Party of European Socialists	PSOE	23	24
Party of European Socialists	LV	1	24
European United Left–Nordic Green Left	IU	4	4
Greens–European Free Alliance	BNG	1	4
Greens–European Free Alliance	ERC	1	4
Greens–European Free Alliance	PAR	1	4
Greens–European Free Alliance	BNV	1	4
European Liberal Democrat and Reform Party	CDC	1	3
European Liberal Democrat and Reform Party	EAJ/PNV	1	3
European Liberal Democrat and Reform Party	UV	1	3
Non-Inscrits	INDEP	1 (Note: Koldo Gorostiaga, former EH MEP.)	1

== Parties and candidates ==
The electoral law allowed for parties and federations registered in the interior ministry, alliances and groupings of electors to present lists of candidates. Parties and federations intending to form an alliance were required to inform the relevant electoral commission within 10 days of the election call. In order to be entitled to run, parties, federations, alliances and groupings of electors needed to secure the signature of at least 15,000 registered electors; this requirement could be lifted and replaced through the signature of at least 50 elected officials—deputies, senators, MEPs or members from the legislative assemblies of autonomous communities or from local city councils. Electors and elected officials were disallowed from signing for more than one list.

Below is a list of the main parties and alliances which contested the election:

Candidacy	Parties and alliances	Leading candidate	Ideology	Previous result		Ref.
Candidacy	Parties and alliances	Leading candidate	Ideology	Vote %	Seats	Ref.
PP	List: People's Party (PP); Navarrese People's Union (UPN)	Jaime Mayor Oreja	Conservatism; Christian democracy	39.7%	27	
PSOE	List: Spanish Socialist Workers' Party (PSOE); Socialists' Party of Catalonia (PSC); The Greens (LV)	Josep Borrell	Social democracy	35.3%	24	
Galeusca	List: Convergence and Union (CiU); Basque Nationalist Party (EAJ/PNV); Galician Nationalist Bloc (BNG); Valencian Nationalist Bloc (BNV); PSM–Nationalist Agreement (PSM–EN)	Ignasi Guardans	Peripheral nationalism	8.0%	4	
IU–ICV–EUiA	List: United Left (IU); Initiative for Catalonia Greens–United and Alternative Left (ICV–EUiA); Republican Left (IR); Independent Socialists of Extremadura (SIEx); Bloc for Asturias (BA); The Greens of the Balearic Islands (EVIB)	Willy Meyer	Socialism; Communism	6.5%	4	
CE	List: Andalusian Party (PA); Canarian Coalition (CC); Valencian Union (UV); Aragonese Party (PAR); Majorcan Union (UM); Convergence of Democrats of Navarre (CDN); United Extremadura (EU); Asturianist Party (PAS)	Alejandro Rojas-Marcos	Regionalism	3.4%	2	
EdP	List: Republican Left of Catalonia (ERC); Basque Solidarity (EA); Aragonese Union (CHA); Socialist Party of Andalusia (PSA); Left Assembly–Initiative for Andalusia (A–IZ); Andecha Astur (AA); Cantabrian Nationalist Council (CNC); Citizen Initiative of La Rioja (ICLR)	Bernat Joan	Peripheral nationalism	1.1%	2	

The abertzale left tried to run under the umbrella of the Herritarren Zerrenda list (Basque for "Citizens' List"). However, the Spanish Supreme Court annulled HZ lists and banned them from running on 22 May 2004, as it considered that the candidacy's promoters and half of its candidates had links with the outlawed Batasuna and with the ETA environment.

== Opinion polls ==
The tables below list opinion polling results in reverse chronological order, showing the most recent first and using the dates when the survey fieldwork was done, as opposed to the date of publication. Where the fieldwork dates are unknown, the date of publication is given instead. The highest percentage figure in each polling survey is displayed with its background shaded in the leading party's colour. If a tie ensues, this is applied to the figures with the highest percentages. The "Lead" column on the right shows the percentage-point difference between the parties with the highest percentages in a poll.

=== Voting intention estimates ===
The table below lists weighted voting intention estimates. Refusals are generally excluded from the party vote percentages, while question wording and the treatment of "don't know" responses and those not intending to vote may vary between polling organisations. When available, seat projections determined by the polling organisations are displayed below (or in place of) the percentages in a smaller font.

Color key:

Exit poll

Polling firm/Commissioner	Fieldwork date	Sample size	Turnout	PP	PSOE	GEC	IU	CE	EP	Lead
2004 EP election	13 Jun 2004	—N/a	45.1	41.2; 24	43.5; 25	5.1; 2	4.1; 2	1.3; 0	2.5; 1	2.3
Sigma Dos/Antena 3	13 Jun 2004	?	?	39.5– 41.5; 22/24	42.0– 44.0; 23/25	6.0; 3	5.0; 2/3	1.6; 0/1	2.4; 1	2.5
Ipsos–Eco/RTVE	13 Jun 2004	?	?	39.9; 21/24	43.4; 23/26	5.5; 2/3	4.4; 1/2	1.7; 0/1	2.6; 1/2	3.5
Celeste-Tel/La Razón	6 Jun 2004	1,202	?	37.2; 21/22	46.1; 26/27	5.2; 2/3	4.6; 2	1.3; 0	3.0; 1	8.9
Noxa/La Vanguardia	31 May–3 Jun 2004	1,200	?	37.4; 22	46.1; 27	4.9; 2	4.8; 2	1.5; 0	2.4; 1	8.7
Sigma Dos/El Mundo	1–2 Jun 2004	1,000	?	37.9; 21/23	42.6; 24/26	5.2; 2/3	5.2; 2/3	1.7; 0/1	3.1; 1	4.7
TNS Demoscopia/ABC	31 May–2 Jun 2004	2,005	55–60	38.4; 22	46.7; 27	4.6; 2	3.7; 2	1.1; 0	2.2; 1	8.3
CIS	19–26 May 2004	4,781	76.7	36.7; 22	46.3; 27	5.0; 2	4.4; 2	1.5; 0	3.1; 1	9.6
Opina/El País	24 May 2004	1,000	?	37.0	43.0	6.0	5.0	1.5	2.5	6.0
Opina/Cadena SER	13 May 2004	1,000	?	37.0	45.0	6.0	5.0	1.5	2.5	8.0
Sigma Dos/El Mundo	26 Apr 2004	?	?	39.2	45.1	2.1	3.6	–	–	5.9
Vox Pública/El Periódico	13–15 Apr 2004	1,501	?	36.5; 21/22	42.2; 25	5.7; 3	5.8; 3	? 0/1	2.3; 1	5.7
Burson-Marsteller	13 Apr 2004	?	?	38.6; 23	35.5; 22	–	–	–	–	3.1
Opina/El País	30 Mar 2004	1,000	?	38.8	45.9	4.2	5.3	–	–	7.1
Celeste-Tel	14 Feb 2001	1,156	?	38.4; 27	37.9; 27	4.5; 3	4.1; 2	3.3; 2	–	0.5
1999 EP election	13 Jun 1999	—N/a	63.0	39.7; 27	35.3; 24	8.0; 4	6.5; 4	3.4; 2	1.1; 2	4.4

=== Voting preferences ===
The table below lists raw, unweighted voting preferences.

Polling firm/Commissioner	Fieldwork date	Sample size	PP	PSOE	GEC	IU	CE	EP	Question	X mark	Lead
2004 EP election (Note: Does not include non-resident citizens.)	13 Jun 2004	—N/a	18.8	19.7	2.4	1.9	0.6	1.1	—N/a	54.1	0.9
TNS Demoscopia/ABC	31 May–2 Jun 2004	2,005	22.0	27.5	2.4	2.1	0.6	1.2	39.1	2.6	5.5
CIS	19–26 May 2004	4,781	20.7	39.8	2.6	2.8	0.5	1.4	22.8	8.2	19.1
Vox Pública/El Periódico	13–15 Apr 2004	1,501	22.3	28.2	–	–	–	–	–	–	5.9
1999 EP election	13 Jun 1999	—N/a	25.4	22.5	5.1	4.2	2.1	0.6	—N/a	35.7	2.9

=== Victory preferences ===
The table below lists opinion polling on the victory preferences for each party in the event of a European Parliament election taking place.

Polling firm/Commissioner	Fieldwork date	Sample size	PP	PSOE	GEC	IU	CE	EP	Other/ None	Question	Lead
Noxa/La Vanguardia	31 May–3 Jun 2004	1,200	31.0	50.0	2.0	3.0	–	2.0	5.0	7.0	19.0
CIS	19–26 May 2004	4,781	24.4	49.1	2.0	2.7	0.1	1.1	5.0	15.5	24.7
Opina/El País	24 May 2004	1,000	27.8	47.3	–	–	–	–	2.7	22.2	19.5
Opina/Cadena SER	13 May 2004	1,000	28.5	47.8	–	–	–	–	3.2	20.5	19.3

=== Victory likelihood ===
The table below lists opinion polling on the perceived likelihood of victory for each party in the event of a European Parliament election taking place.

Polling firm/Commissioner	Fieldwork date	Sample size	PP	PSOE	Other/ None	Question	Lead
Noxa/La Vanguardia	31 May–3 Jun 2004	1,200	22.0	59.0	1.0	18.0	37.0
CIS	19–26 May 2004	4,781	12.3	57.2	0.8	29.7	44.9
Opina/El País	24 May 2004	1,000	16.0	48.3	0.3	35.4	32.3
Opina/Cadena SER	13 May 2004	1,000	18.0	49.2	1.9	30.9	31.2

== Results ==
=== Overall ===
← Summary of the 13 June 2004 European Parliament election results in Spain →
Parties and alliances	Popular vote			Seats	
Parties and alliances	Votes	%	±pp	Total	+/−
Spanish Socialist Workers' Party (PSOE)	6,741,112	43.46	+8.13	25	+1
People's Party (PP)	6,393,192	41.21	+1.47	24	−3
Galeusca–Peoples of Europe (Galeusca)^{1}	798,816	5.15	−2.87	2	−2
United Left–Initiative for Catalonia Greens–EUiA (IU–ICV–EUiA)^{2}	643,136	4.15	−2.36	2	−2
Europe of the Peoples (EdP)^{3}	380,709	2.45	+1.34	1	−1
European Coalition (CE)^{4}	197,231	1.27	−2.17	0	−2
The Greens–European Green Group (LV–GVE)^{5}	68,536	0.44	−0.22	0	±0
Cannabis Party for Legalisation and Normalisation (PCLyN)	54,460	0.35	New	0	±0
Aralar (Aralar)	19,993	0.13	New	0	±0
Socialist Action Party (PASOC)	13,810	0.09	New	0	±0
Democratic and Social Centre (CDS)	11,820	0.08	−0.10	0	±0
For a Fairer World (PUM+J)	9,202	0.06	New	0	±0
Popular Unity Candidacy (CUP)	8,180	0.05	New	0	±0
Internationalist Socialist Workers' Party (POSI)^{6}	7,976	0.05	+0.02	0	±0
Family and Life Party (PFyV)	7,958	0.05	New	0	±0
New Green Left (NIV)	6,876	0.04	New	0	±0
National Democracy (DN)	6,314	0.04	±0.00	0	±0
The Phalanx (FE)	5,935	0.04	−0.01	0	±0
The Unemployed (Los Parados)	5,314	0.03	New	0	±0
Commoners' Land–Castilian Nationalist Party (TC–PNC)	5,267	0.03	−0.03	0	±0
Spanish Phalanx of the CNSO (FE de las JONS)	4,484	0.03	New	0	±0
Communist Party of the Peoples of Spain–Internationalist Struggle (PCPE–LI)	4,281	0.03	−0.09	0	±0
Humanist Party (PH)	3,923	0.03	−0.03	0	±0
Spanish Democratic Party (PADE)	3,454	0.02	−0.06	0	±0
Regionalist Party of the Leonese Country (PREPAL)	3,308	0.02	−0.01	0	±0
Catalan State (EC)	2,594	0.02	New	0	±0
We–People's Unity (Nós–UP)	2,516	0.02	New	0	±0
Authentic Phalanx (FA)	2,008	0.01	New	0	±0
Liberal Coalition (CL)	1,719	0.01	New	0	±0
Carlist Party (PC)	1,600	0.01	New	0	±0
Liberal Centrist Union (UCL)	1,544	0.01	New	0	±0
Basque Citizens (EH)	n/a	n/a	−1.45	0	−1
Blank ballots	95,014	0.61	−1.08		
Total	15,512,282			54	−10
Valid votes	15,512,282	99.02	−0.19		
Invalid votes	154,209	0.98	+0.19		
Votes cast / turnout	15,666,491	45.14	−17.91		
Abstentions	19,039,553	54.86	+17.91		
Registered voters	34,706,044				
Sources
Footnotes: ^{1} Galeusca–Peoples of Europe results are compared to the combined totals of Convergence and Union, Nationalist Coalition–Europe of the Peoples in the Basque Country and Navarre and Galician Nationalist Bloc in the 1999 election.; ^{2} United Left–Initiative for Catalonia Greens–EUiA results are compared to the combined totals of United Left–United and Alternative Left and The Greens–Left of the Peoples in Catalonia in the 1999 election.; ^{3} Europe of the Peoples results are compared to the combined totals of Nationalist Coalition–Europe of the Peoples—not including results in the Balearic Islands, the Basque Country and Navarre—, The Greens–Left of the Peoples in Aragon and Andecha Astur in the 1999 election.; ^{4} European Coalition (2004) results are compared to the combined totals of European Coalition (1999), Nationalist Coalition–Europe of the Peoples in the Balearic Islands, United Extremadura and Asturianist Party in the 1999 election.; ^{5} The Greens–European Green Group results are compared to The Greens–Green Group totals in the 1999 election.; ^{6} Internationalist Socialist Workers' Party results are compared to Coalition for the Repeal of the Maastricht Treaty totals in the 1999 election.

Popular vote
PSOE	43.46%
PP	41.21%
Galeusca	5.15%
IU–ICV–EUiA	4.15%
EdP	2.45%
CE	1.27%
Others	1.70%
Blank ballots	0.61%

Seats
PSOE	46.30%
PP	44.44%
Galeusca	3.70%
IU–ICV–EUiA	3.70%
EdP	1.85%

=== Maps ===
Vote winner strength by province.

Vote winner strength by autonomous community.

=== Distribution by European group ===
Summary of political group distribution in the 6th European Parliament (2004–2009)
Groups	Parties	Seats	Total	%
Party of European Socialists (PES)	Spanish Socialist Workers' Party (PSOE)	24	24	44.44
European People's Party–European Democrats (EPP–ED)	People's Party (PP); Navarrese People's Union (UPN)	23; 1	24	44.44
Greens–European Free Alliance (Greens/EFA)	Confederation of the Greens (LV); Initiative for Catalonia Greens (ICV); Republican Left of Catalonia (ERC)	1; 1; 1	3	5.56
Alliance of Liberals and Democrats for Europe (ALDE)	Democratic Convergence of Catalonia (CDC); Basque Nationalist Party (EAJ/PNV)	1; 1	2	3.70
European United Left–Nordic Green Left (GUE/NGL)	United Left (IU)	1	1	1.85
Total		54	54	100.00

=== Elected legislators ===
The following table lists the elected legislators:

Elected legislators
#	Name	List
1	Josep Borrell Fontelles	PSOE
2	Jaime María Mayor Oreja	PP
3	Rosa María Díez González	PSOE
4	Luisa Fernanda Rudi Úbeda	PP
5	Enrique Barón Crespo	PSOE
6	José Gerardo Galeote Quecedo	PP
7	Raimon Obiols i Germá	PSOE
8	Alejo Vidal-Quadras Roca	PP
9	María Elena Valenciano Martínez-Orozco	PSOE
10	Ana Mato Adrover	PP
11	Luis Yáñez-Barnuevo García	PSOE
12	Cristóbal Ricardo Montoro Romero	PP
13	Bárbara Dührkop Dührkop	PSOE
14	José Manuel García-Margallo Marfil	PP
15	Carlos Carnero González	PSOE
16	María del Carmen Fraga Estévez	PP
17	Ignasi Guardans Cambó	Galeusca
18	Manuel Medina Ortega	PSOE
19	José Javier Pomes Ruiz	PP
20	Inés Ayala Sender	PSOE
21	Willy Meyer Pleite	IU–ICV–EUiA
22	Pilar del Castillo Vera	PP
23	Emilio Menéndez del Valle	PSOE
24	Luis de Grandes Pascual	PP
25	Antolín Sánchez Presedo	PSOE
26	Luis Herrero-Tejedor Algar	PP
27	Iratxe García Pérez	PSOE
28	Agustín Díaz de Mera García Consuegra	PP
29	Joan Calabuig Rull	PSOE
30	Fernando Manuel Fernández Martín	PP
31	Francisca Pleguezuelos Aguilar	PSOE
32	Carlos José Iturgaiz Angulo	PP
33	Alejandro Cercas Alonso	PSOE
34	Antonio López-Istúriz White	PP
35	Josu Ortuondo Larrea	Galeusca
36	Antonio Masip Hidalgo	PSOE
37	Bernat Joan i Marí	EdP
38	Francisco José Millán Mon	PP
39	María Badía i Cutxet	PSOE
40	Íñigo Méndez de Vigo Montojo	PP
41	Miguel Ángel Martínez Martínez	PSOE
42	David Hammerstein Mintz	PSOE
43	María del Pilar Ayuso González	PP
44	Raül Romeva Rueda	IU–ICV–EUiA
45	Rosa Miguélez Ramos	PSOE
46	José Ignacio Salafranca Sánchez-Neyra	PP
47	Javier Moreno Sánchez	PSOE
48	Cristina Gutiérrez-Cortines Corral	PP
49	Teresa Riera Madurell	PSOE
50	Salvador Garriga Polledo	PP
51	María Isabel Salinas García	PSOE
52	Daniel Luis Varela Suanzes-Carpegna	PP
53	María Sornosa Martínez	PSOE
54	María Esther Herranz García	PP

== Bibliography ==
- Ley Orgánica 5/1985, de 19 de junio, del Régimen Electoral General (Organic Law 5/1985). Official State Gazette (in Spanish). 19 June 1985 [version as of 29 November 2003]. BOE-A-1985-11672.
- Treaty of Nice amending the Treaty on European Union, the Treaties establishing the European Communities and certain related acts (2001/C 80/01). Official Journal of the European Communities. 10 March 2001. 12001C/TXT.
