= Barnard (disambiguation) =

Barnard is a given name and family name.

Barnard may also refer to:

== Places ==
=== Australia ===
- Barnard Island Group National Park, a national park in Queensland

=== Canada ===
- Mount Barnard (Alsek Ranges), a.k.a. Boundary Peak 160, a mountain on the British Columbia-Alaska border
- Mount Barnard (Canada), a mountain on the British Columbia-Alberta border/Continental Divide in the Canadian Rockies
- Barnard Island, an island in the Estevan Group on the North Coast of British Columbia

=== United Kingdom ===
- Barnard Castle, a castle and its surrounding town in Teesdale, County Durham, England
- Barnards Green, a popular district centre in Great Malvern, Worcestershire, England

=== United States ===
- Barnard, Indiana, an unincorporated community
- Barnard, Kansas, a city
- Barnard, Michigan, an unincorporated community
- Barnard, Missouri, a city
- Barnard, South Dakota, an unincorporated community
- Barnard, Vermont, a town
- Mount Barnard (Alsek Ranges), a.k.a. Boundary Peak 160, a mountain on the Alaska-British Columbia border
- Mount Barnard (California), a mountain in California

== Astronomy ==
- Barnard Catalogue, a list of dark nebulae compiled by Edward Emerson Barnard
- Barnard's Loop, an emission nebula in the constellation of Orion
- Barnard's Galaxy (NGC 6822), a barred irregular galaxy
- Barnard's Star, a red dwarf
- Comet Barnard, name of 17 comets discovered by Edward Emerson Barnard

== Other uses ==
- Barnard (cyclecar)
- Barnard (lunar crater)
- Barnard (Martian crater)
- Barnard College, of Columbia University, an American independent college of liberal arts and sciences for women
- Barnard's Express, or B.X. Express, a pioneer freight and stagecoach firm in British Columbia
- Barnard's Inn, the current home of Gresham College in Holborn, London, England
- HMS Barnard Castle (renamed Empire Shelter), a Castle-class corvette of the Royal Navy (1944 – 1955)

== See also ==
- Bernard (disambiguation)
- Bernhard (disambiguation)
