= Pilar Ayuso González =

Spanish politician (born 1942)

María del Pilar Ayuso González (born 16 June 1942 in Badajoz) who served as a Spanish politician and Member of the European Parliament with the People's Party, part of the European People's Party

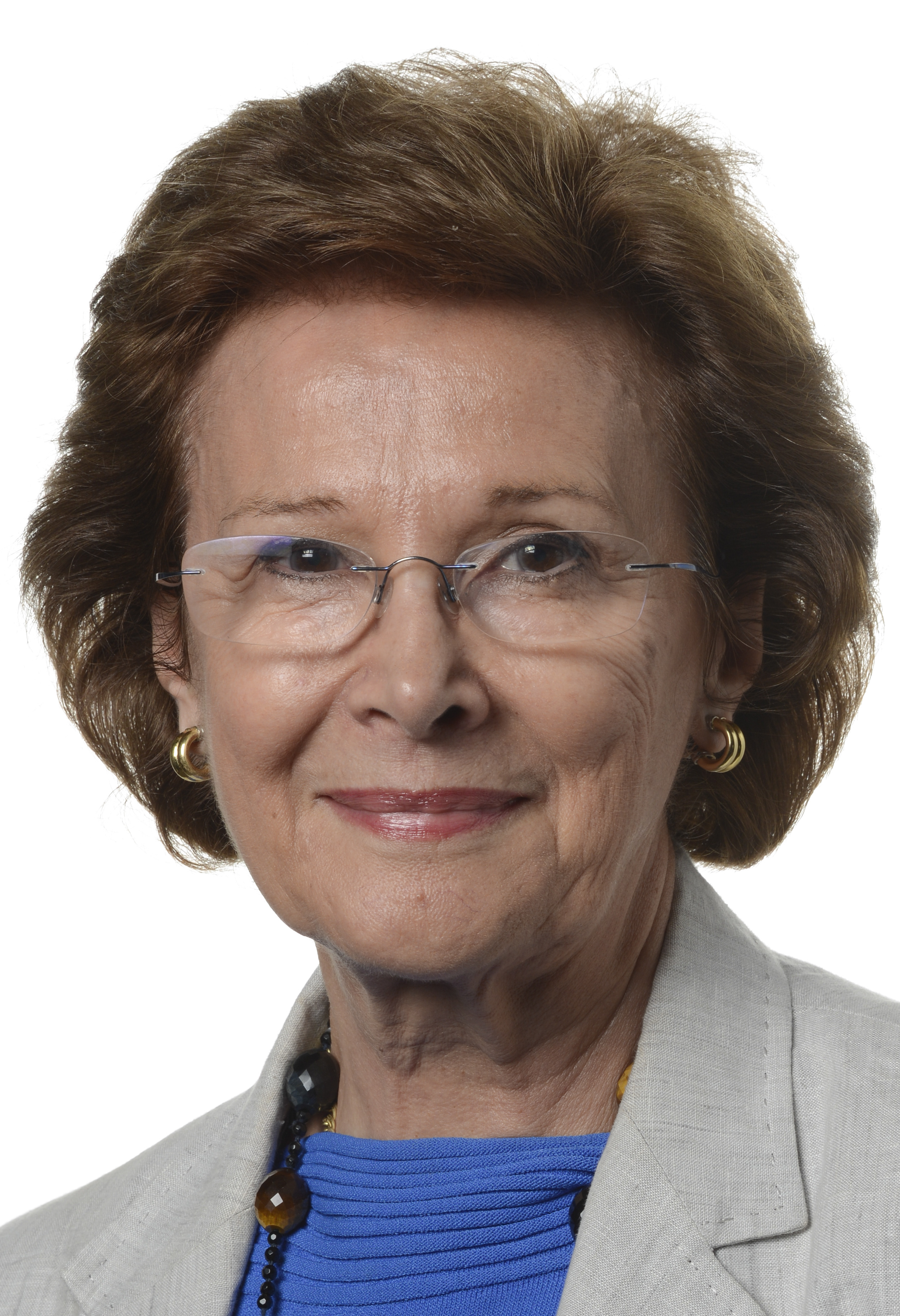

== Education ==
- 1965: Agricultural engineer
- 1970: PhD in Agricultural Engineering
- Diploma in European Community studies

== Early career ==
- Researcher, Director of agrarian research projects at the National Agrarian Research Institute in Madrid
- 1996-1999: Director-General for Food Policy and Agri-food Industries, Ministry of Agriculture

== Political career ==
=== Career in national politics ===
- 1981-1984: Secretary of the PP National Committee on Agricultural Studies
- 1991-1996: Member of the Castile-La Mancha Regional Parliament for Ciudad Real
- Member of the National Executive Committee of the People's Party
- Member of the Executive Committee of the PP for Castile-La Mancha
- Member of the Ciudad Real Provincial Executive Committee of the PP
- Member of the European Union of Women and Vice-Chairwoman of the Association of Women for Democracy

=== Member of the European Parliament, 1999–2019 ===
Ayuso joined the European Parliament in the 1999 European elections. Throughout her time in parliament, she served on the Committee on the Environment, Public Health and Food Safety. In this capacity, she was her parliamentary group's rapporteur on the fuel quality directive (FQD) in 2007. She was also a substitute for the Committee on Agriculture and Rural Development and the Committee on Industry, Research and Energy. In 2018, she joined the temporary Special Committee on the Union's authorisation procedure for pesticides.

In addition to her committee assignments, Ayuso was a member of the Delegation for relations with Mercosur and of the European Parliament Intergroup on Children's Rights.

== Political positions ==
In September 2018 Gonzalez voted against the European Union triggering article 7 procedure against Hungary, due to the country's government posing a “systematic threat” to democracy and the rule of law.

== Recognition ==
- Civil Order of Agricultural Merit

== See also ==
- 2004 European Parliament election in Spain
