= Francisco José Millán Mon =

Spanish politician (born 1955)

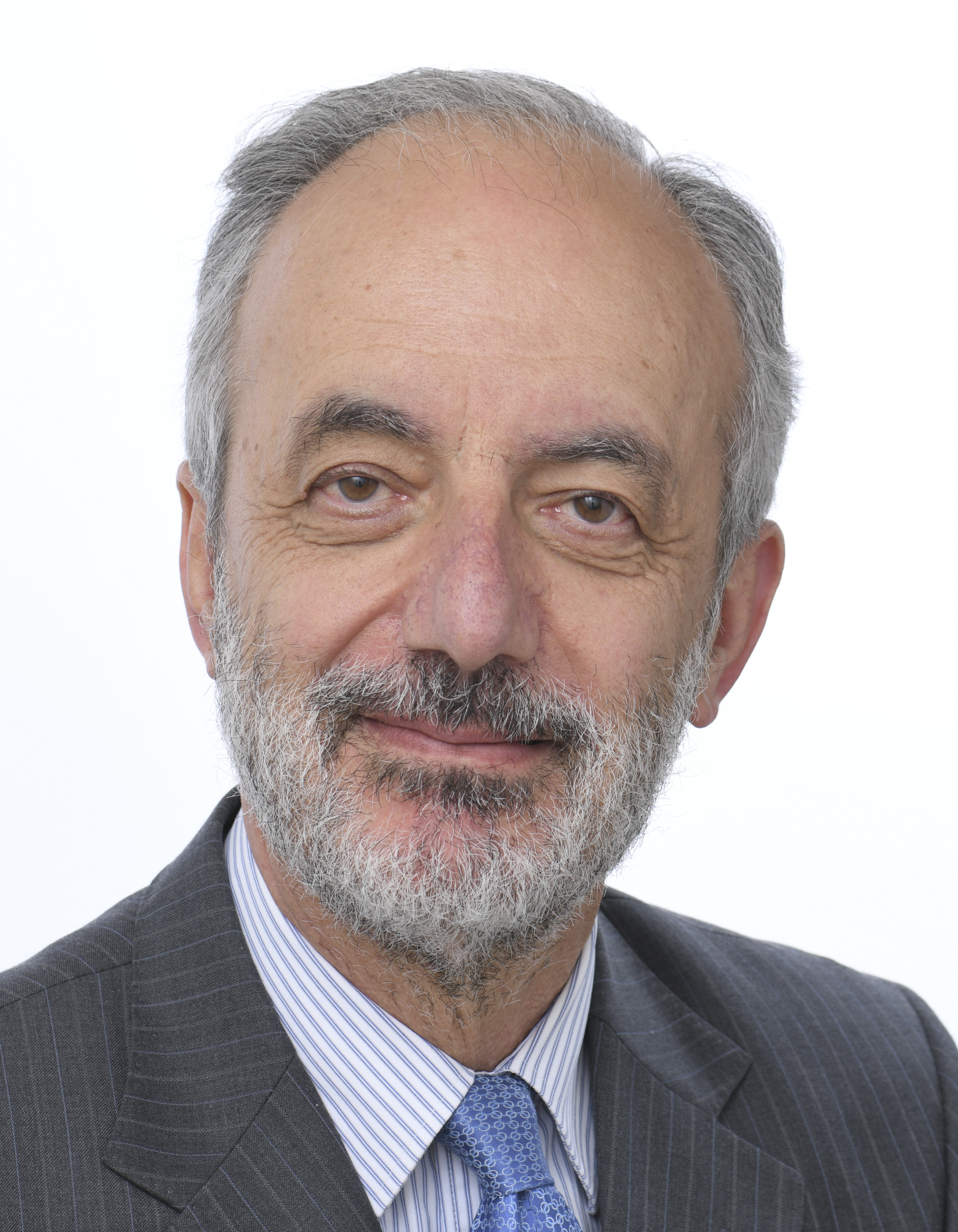
Francisco Millán Mon

Francisco José Millán Mon (pronounced [fɾanˈθisko xoˈse miˈʎam ˈmon]; born 8 March 1955) is a Spanish politician and Member of the European Parliament with the People's Party, part of the European People's Party. Mon was born in Pontevedra. He sits on the European Parliament's Committee on Foreign Affairs, and is a substitute for the Committee on Development and a member of the Delegation to the Euro-Mediterranean Parliamentary Assembly.

== Education ==
- 1977: Graduate in law (Santiago de Compostela)
- 1979: Diploma in International Studies (School of Diplomacy, Madrid)
- 1980: Start of diplomatic career

== Career ==
- 1980-1982: Directorate-general of Consular Affairs, Ministry of Foreign Affairs
- 1982-1984: International legal adviser, Ministry of Foreign Affairs
- 1984-1987: First Secretary of the Spanish Embassy in Bonn
- 1987-1991: Cabinet of the Secretary-General for Foreign Policy, Ministry of Foreign Affairs
- 1991-1993: Director of the cabinet of the Secretary-General for Relations with the European Communities
- 1993-1996: First consul at the Spanish Embassy in Rabat
- 1996-1998: Director of the Cabinet of the Secretary-General for Foreign Policy and the European Union
- 1998-2000: Director-General for Europe, Ministry of Foreign Affairs
- 2000-2003: Adviser to the First Deputy Prime Minister of the Spanish Government
- Holder of several Spanish and foreign decorations

== See also ==
- 2004 European Parliament election in Spain
