= María Sornosa Martinez =

Spanish politician

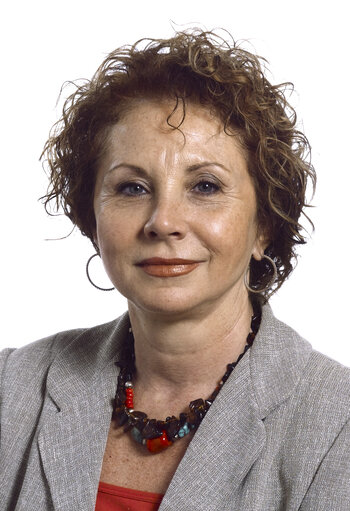

María Sornosa Martínez (born 15 June 1949 in Manises, Valencia) is a Spanish politician and Member of the European Parliament with the Spanish Socialist Workers' Party (PSOE), part of the Socialist Group. She sits on the European Parliament's Committee on the Environment, Public Health and Food Safety.

Sornosa Martinez is a substitute for the Committee on Employment and Social Affairs, a member of the Delegation to the ACP-European Union Joint Parliamentary Assembly and a substitute for the Delegation for relations with the countries of Central America.

== Education ==
- 1991: Graduate in geography and history, University of Valencia.
- 1992: Environment and regional planning adviser to the Valencian regional government.
- 1994: Diploma in neurolinguistic programming.

== Career ==
- 1979-1994: Member of the Manises Municipal Council, with responsibility for health.
- since 1994: Member of the European Parliament.

She is the author of the book Viajes, memoria parlamentaria.

== See also ==
- 2004 European Parliament election in Spain
