= Luis Herrero-Tejedor Algar =

Spanish politician (born 1955)

Luis Francisco Herrero-Tejedor Algar (born 4 October 1955 in Castelló de la Plana) is a Spanish politician and former Member of the European Parliament with the People's Party, part of the European People's Party. He sat on the European Parliament's Committee on Culture and Education.

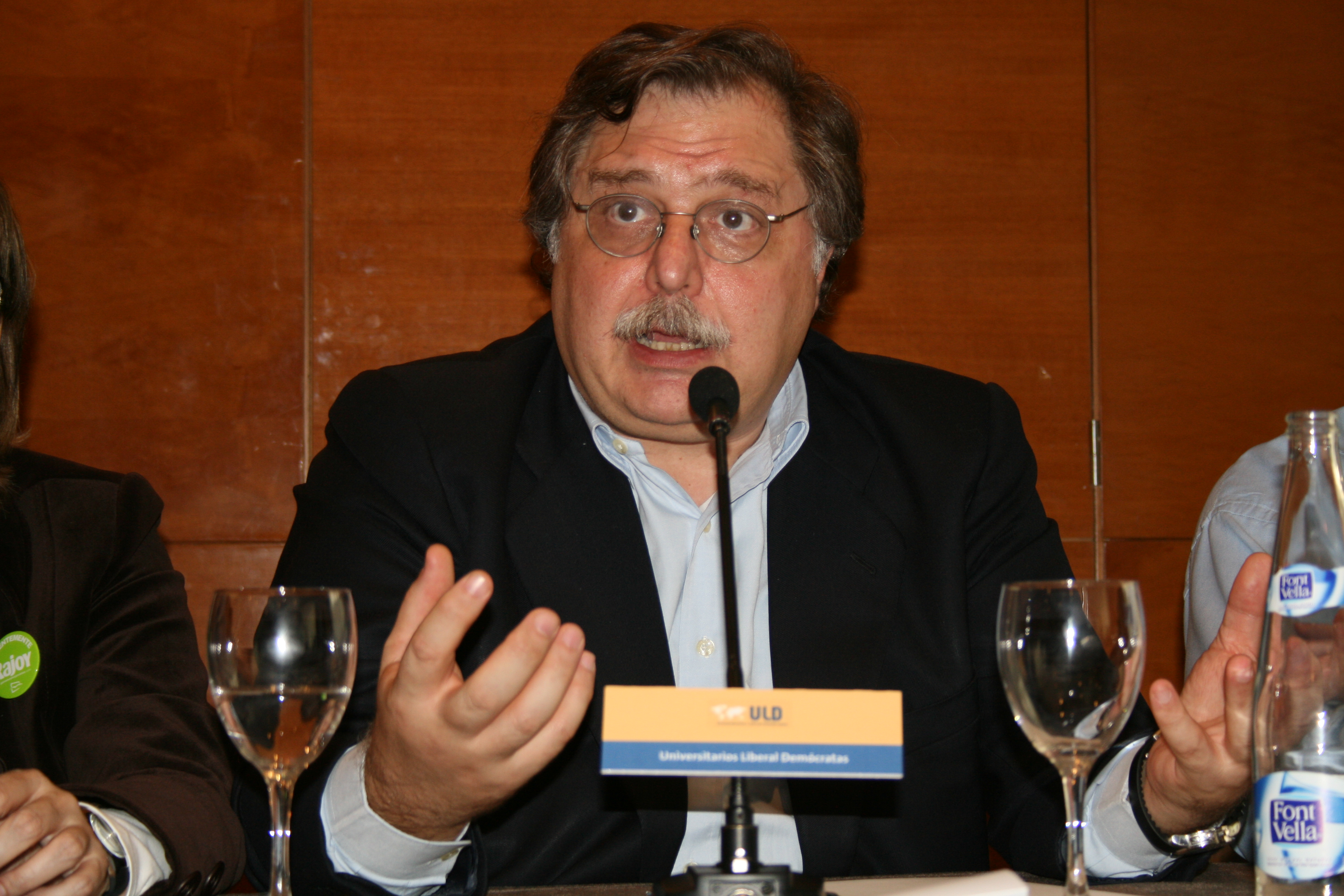
In 2008

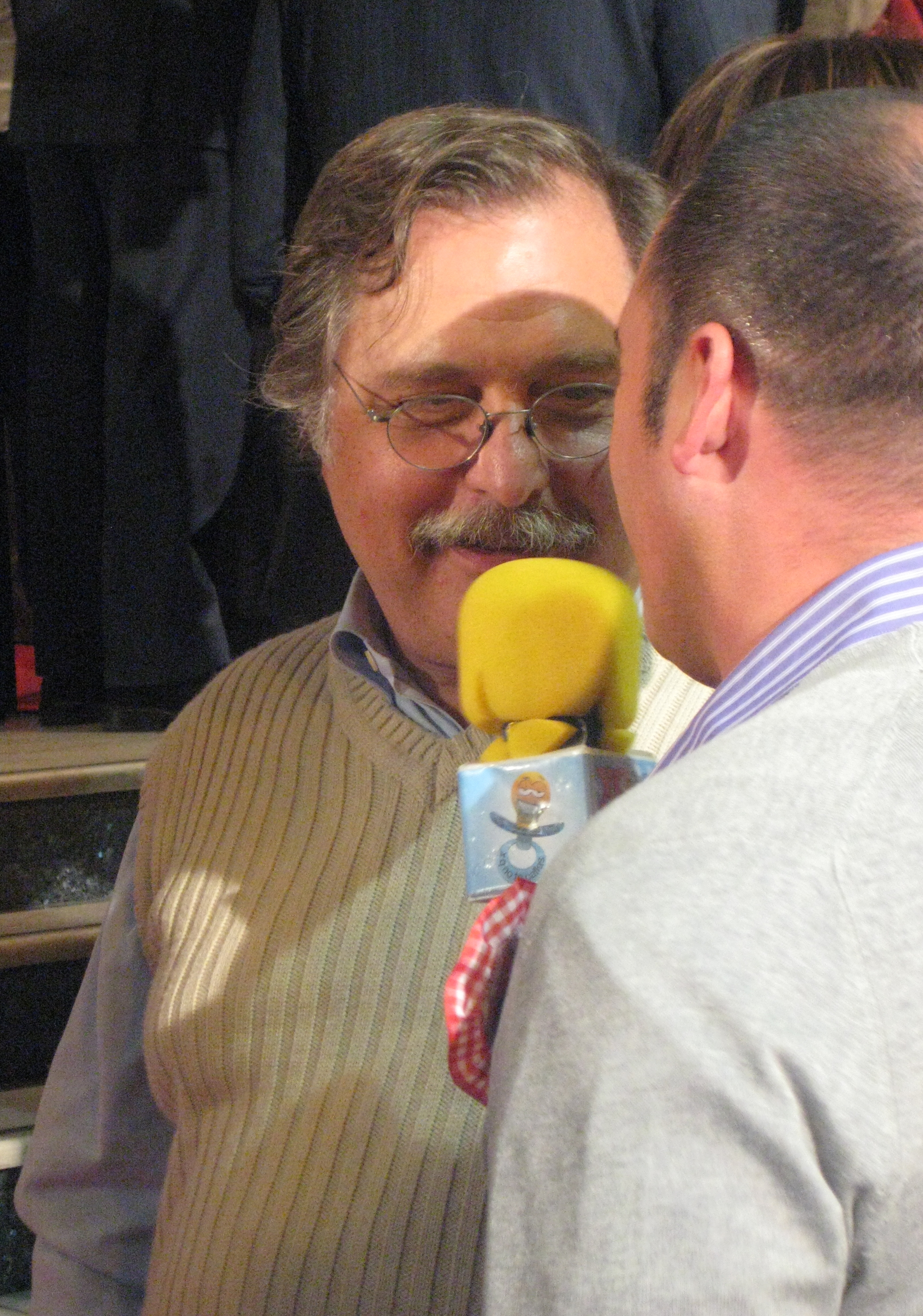
In 2008

He is a substitute for the Committee on Civil Liberties, Justice and Home Affairs, a member of the Delegation for relations with the countries of Central America and a substitute for the Delegation to the EU-Mexico Joint Parliamentary Committee.

== Career ==
- B.A. in Journalism and Information Sciences (University of Navarre)
- Director of Diario Mediterráneo
- Deputy director for news at the Antena 3 radio station
- Editor-in-chief of Época magazine
- Political correspondent for the Antena 3 television channel
- Director of the midday news programme and the evening news on the Antena 3 television channel
- Director of the La Linterna news programme on the COPE channel
- Director of the programme 'La Mañana' on the COPE channel

== See also ==
- 2004 European Parliament election in Spain
