= Antonio Masip Hidalgo =

Spanish politician

Member of the European Parliament
- Constituency: Spain

Mayor
- In office 1983–1991

Congress of Deputies
- In office 1983–1987

Personal details
- Born: 3 May 1946 (age 80) Oviedo, Spain
- Party: Spanish Socialist Workers' Party
- Occupation: Politician

Antonio Masip Hidalgo (born May 3, 1946) is a Spanish politician, lawyer and a Member of the European Parliament for the Spanish Socialist Workers' Party, part of the Socialist Group. He sits on the European Parliament's Committee on Legal Affairs.

He is also a substitute for the Committee on Civil Liberties, Justice and Home Affairs, a member of the Delegation for relations with the Palestinian Legislative Council and a substitute for the Delegation for relations with the countries of the Andean Community.

He was mayor of his hometown from 1983 to 1991, and regional congressman in Asturias from 1983 to 1987. Masip was first involved in Spanish politics during Franco's Spanish State (being a member of the opposition Frente de Liberación Popular—"Felipe"), and then being a member of the Spanish Socialist Workers' Party since 1979.

He was one of the first lawyers in Asturias to defend workers outside the Francoist vertical trade unions in the early 1970s. In 1979 he defended the accused of the Holy Chamber's Jewels theft (during which traditional 10th century Asturian symbols like the Victory Cross, Angel's Cross and Agates' Box were stolen).

== Education ==
- 1971: graduate in law

== Career ==
- since 1972: Practicing lawyer
- 1997-2003: Secretary-General of the Spanish Socialist Workers' Party in Oviedo
- 2000-2004: Member of the Spanish Socialist Workers' Party Federal Committee
- 1983-1991: Mayor of Oviedo
- 1982-1983: Minister for Culture and Sport in the Regional Government of Asturias
- 1983: Chairman of the Institute of Asturian Studies
- Vice-president of the Prince of Asturias Foundation
- 1982-1987: Member of the Asturian Regional Parliament
- Author of several books (including Oviedo al fondo, Desde mi ventana, De Oviedo a Salinas por el Eo and La sirenita y otros coletazos) and other works (including Indalecio Prieto y Oviedo, Apunte para un estudio de la Guerra Civil en Asturias, La última reunión del Consejo Soberano de Asturias y León, La autodeterminación del Sáhara Occidental, Alegaciones al Estatuto de Autonomía de Asturias, Asturias en las ediciones de 'Voyage au bout de la nuit' de Céline and El pintor Luis Fernández)

== See also ==
- 2004 European Parliament election in Spain

== External links and references ==
- MEP's website
- MEP's information at the European Parliament
- MEP information at the FFII
