= Agustín Díaz de Mera García Consuegra =

Spanish politician

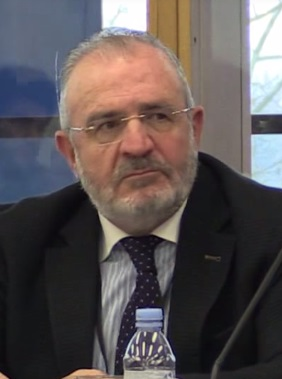
- Díaz de Mera in 2015

Member of the European Parliament
- In office 2004–2019
- Constituency: Spain

Senate
- In office 1996–2004

Personal details
- Born: 27 September 1947 (age 78) Daimiel, Ciudad Real
- Party: People's Party
- Occupation: Politician

Agustín Díaz De Mera García Consuegra (born 27 September 1947 in Daimiel (Ciudad Real)) is a Spanish politician who served as a Member of the European Parliament with the People's Party, part of the European People's Party, from 2004 until 2019.

Díaz de Mera was elected to the Spanish Senate in 1989 and served there from 1996 to 2004 and to the Spanish Congress of Deputies in 1993 representing Avila.

In Parliament, De Mera was a member of the Committee on Civil Liberties, Justice and Home Affairs. On the committee, he served as the Parliament's rapporteur on the reform of Europol and visa requirements for non-EU nationals. He was also a substitute for the Committee on Agriculture and Rural Development and a member of the Delegation for relations with Iran.

== Education ==
- Graduate in modern and contemporary history
- Diploma in European Community studies

== Career ==
- Director of the 'San Juan Evangelista' school (Madrid)
- Secretary-General of the PP (Ávila)
- Member of the PP National Executive Committee and of the PP Standing Committee in Castile and Leon
- 1996-2000: Chairman of the PP in Ávila
- Deputy Mayor (Ávila)
- 1999-2002: Mayor of Ávila
- Chairman of the Committee on Defence
- 2002-2004: Director-General of the Police
- Member of the Parliamentary Assembly of the Council of Europe
- Member of the WEU Assembly
- 1997-2001: Chairman of the Council of Europe Committee on Migration, Refugees and Demography
- 2000-2002: Chairman of the Spanish Delegation to the Parliamentary Assembly of the WEU

== Decorations ==
- Grand Cross of the Military Order of Merit with White Distinction
- Knight Commander of the Order of St Gregory the Great, awarded by the Holy See
- Gold medal of the ICPO-Interpol Secretariat-General

== See also ==
- 2004 European Parliament election in Spain
