= Maria Badia i Cutchet =

Spanish politician (1947–2026)

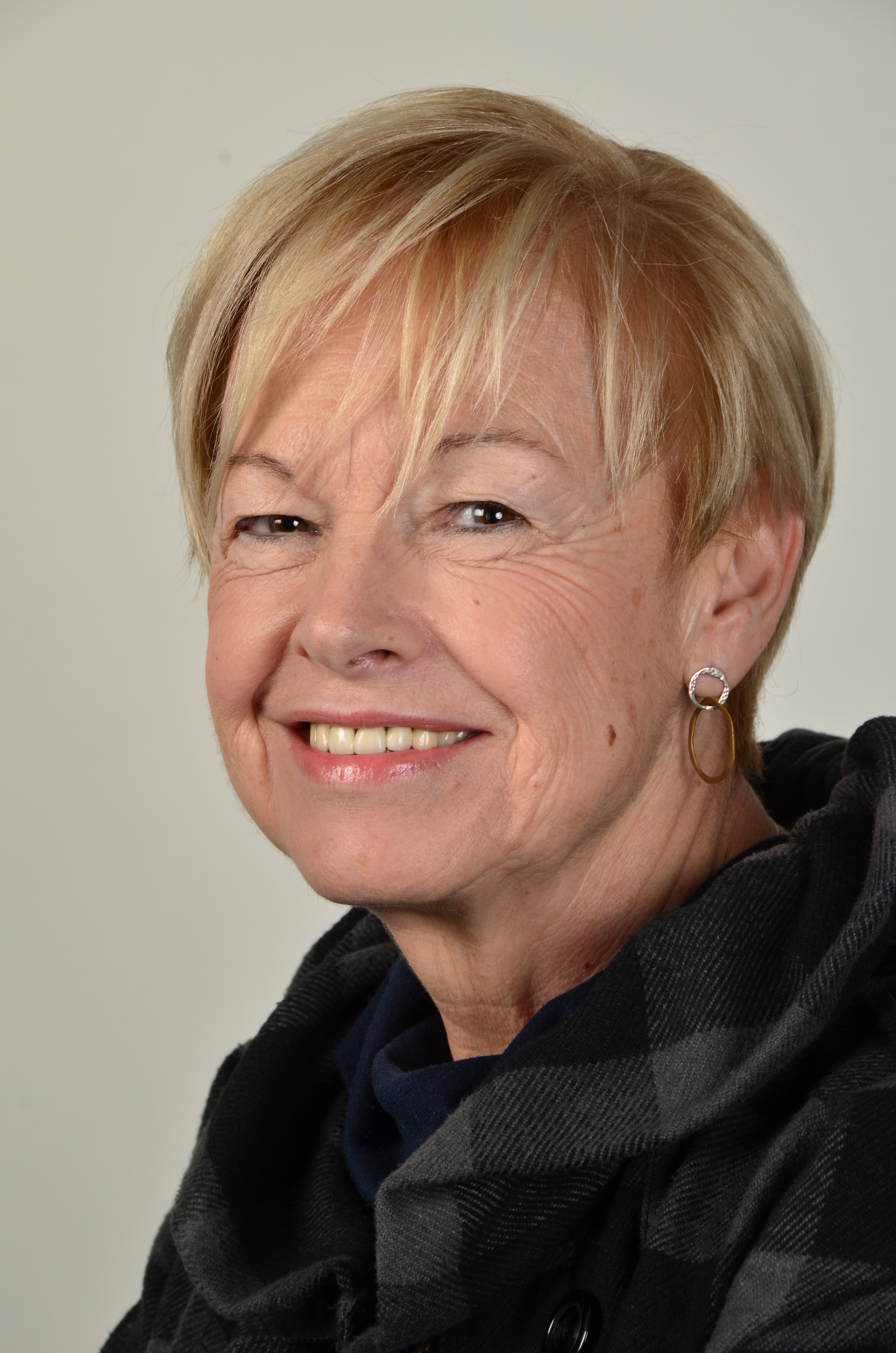
Badia i Cutchet in 2014

Maria Badia i Cutchet (13 May 1947 – 28 March 2026) was a Spanish politician from Catalonia who served as a Member of the European Parliament from 2004 until 2014. She was a member of the Spanish Socialist Workers' Party (PSOE), part of the Socialist Group.

In parliament, Badia served on the European Parliament's Committee on Culture and Education and the Committee on International Trade.

In addition to her committee assignments, Badia was a member of the Delegation for relations with the United States and a substitute for the Delegation to the EU-Russia Parliamentary Cooperation Committee, and the Industry, Research, and Energy committee. She was also a member of the European Alliance Group at the European Committee of the Regions.

== Early life and education ==
Cutchet was born in Sant Quirze del Vallès, Province of Barcelona on 13 May 1947. She studied English Philology at the Autonomous University of Barcelona.

== Career ==
Cutchet taught English at primary schools in Sabadell until 1984.

From 1985 until 1994, she served as the coordinator for the First Socialists' Party of Catalonia (PSC)-PSOE Secretariat. After that, she became the international relations coordinator for the PSOE, and then in 1996 became the Secretariat of the President of the Catalan Parliament. In 2000, she was elected to the board of the PSC, where she served as secretary for European and international policy - a role she was re-elected to in 2004 and 2008.

In 2004, she was elected to the parliament of the European Union, and was re-elected in 2009. In 2009, she was the top candidate for the PSC and was also elected vice president of the Group of Alliance of Socialist & Democrats.

== Death ==
Cutchet died on 28 March 2026, at the age of 78.

== See also ==
- 2004 European Parliament election in Spain
- 2009 European Parliament election in Spain
