= Barnardo =

Barnardo is an Irish surname, and may refer to:

- Freeman Barnardo (1918–1942), British cricket player
- Gwendoline Maud Syrie Barnardo (1879–1955)
- Thomas John Barnardo (1845–1905), an Irish/British philanthropist, founder of the Barnardo's charity for destitute children.
