= Salvador Garriga Polledo =

Spanish politician (born 1957)

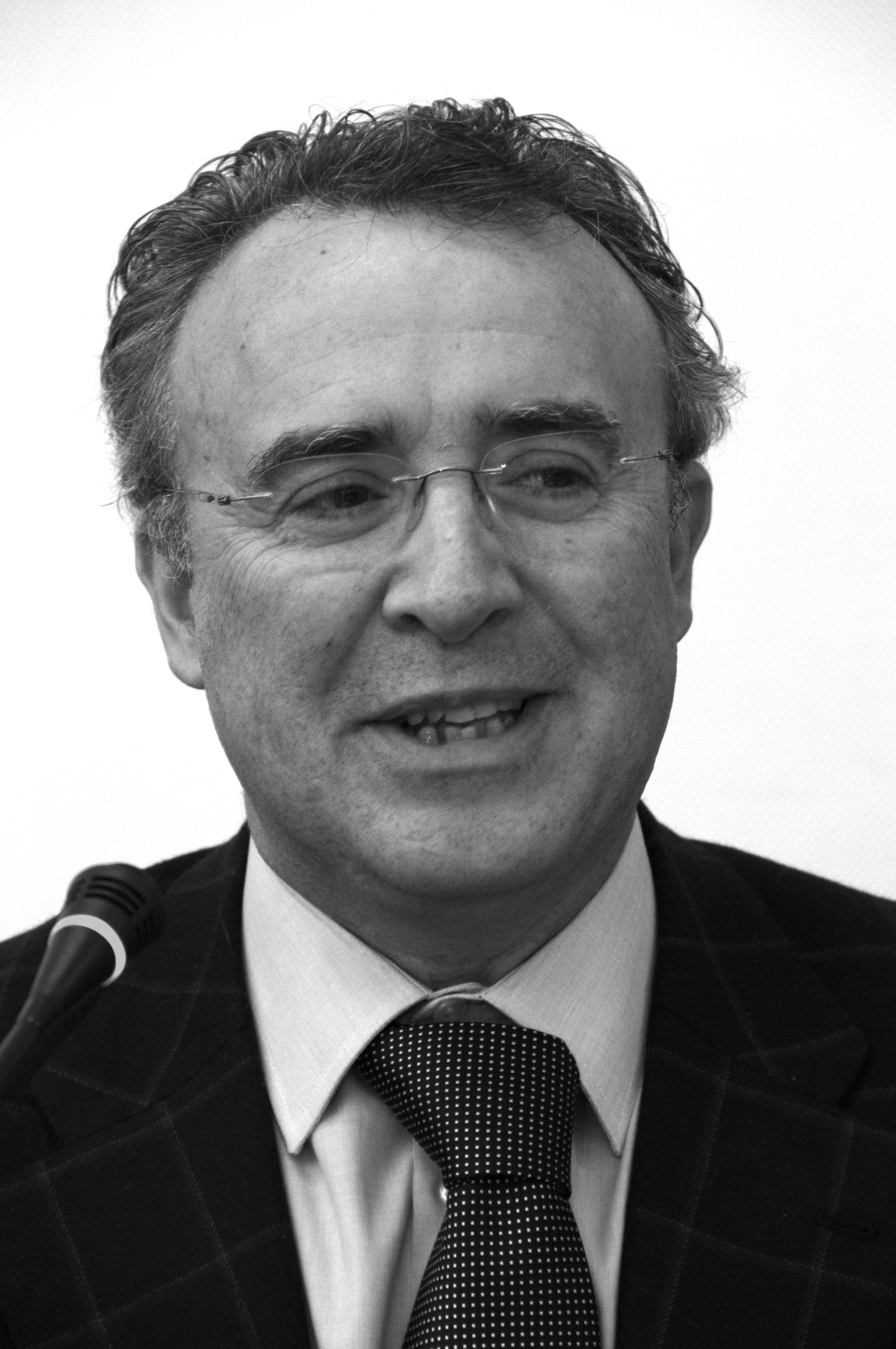
Salvador Garriga, 2013.

Salvador Garriga Polledo (born 6 August 1957 in Gijón) is a Spanish politician. He is a member of the European Parliament with the People's Party (PP), which is part of the European People's Party. He also sits on the European Parliament's Committee on Budgets.

He is a substitute for the Committee on Budgetary Control and the Committee on Economic and Monetary Affairs. Garriga joined the Spanish Congress of deputies as a substitute member in 1990 for Madrid, and served until 1993.

== Career ==
- 1981-1994: Businessman specialising in external trade
- 1982-1987: Responsible for external relations of Nuevas Generaciones del PP (PP youth section)
- 1984-1989: Economic adviser
- 1987-1989 and since 1994: Member of the European Parliament
- 1987-1989: Deputy Chairman of the DEMYC (Democrat Youth Community of Europe)
- 1987-1993: Secretary for Sectoral Relations in the PP

== See also ==
- 2004 European Parliament election in Spain
