= David Hammerstein Mintz =

American-Spanish politician (born 1955)

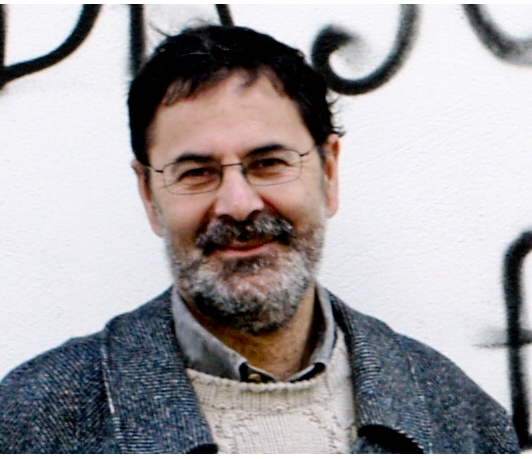

Member of the European Parliament
- In office 20 July 2004 – 13 July 2009

Personal details
- Born: 23 September 1955 (age 70) Los Angeles, California, U.S.
- Citizenship: United States; Spain (from 1986)
- Education: University of California, Los Angeles (UC)
- Occupation: Politician; Sociology
- Known for: Los Verdes; European Greens

David Hammerstein Mintz (born 23 September 1955) is an American and Spanish politician and former Member of the European Parliament for Los Verdes, part of the European Greens. He used to sit on the European Parliament's Committee on Industry, Research and Energy and its Committee on Petitions. He also worked for an international consumer advocacy group, the Trans-Atlantic Consumer Dialogue (TACD), but is now working for the commons network.

Hammerstein was born in Los Angeles, and graduated in sociology from the University of California in 1978. From 1991 to 1999, he worked as a Natural economy and geography teacher at secondary level (in Godella).

== Early life and education ==
Born in Los Angeles, California to a Canadian mother and Polish and Belarusian grandparents, he completed his studies in Sociology at the University of California (1973-1978) in 1978, leaving for Spain that same year and obtaining Spanish nationality in 1986. In the 1980s and 1990s, he stood out as a neighborhood leader in defense of the historic center of Valencia, as well as in numerous campaigns in defense of the urban environment and agricultural land. Between 1991 and 1999, he was a secondary school teacher of natural economics and geography at an international cooperative school in Godella (Valencia), and then until 2003 as an environmental consultant.

== Early career ==
From 1998 to 2003, he was spokesperson for Els Verds del País Valencià, and in 1999 he began working for Los Verdes, being appointed international spokesperson and Spanish delegate to the European Federation of Green Parties from 2000 to 2004. These positions allowed him to work closely with European green leaders such as Daniel Cohn-Bendit, Monica Frassoni, Alexander de Roo, Patricia McKenna, and Reinhard Buetikofer, a political career that would culminate in his becoming a Member of the European Parliament during the Sixth European Parliament (2004-2009).

He works for an international NGO on intellectual property issues in the field of access to knowledge, medicines for the poorest, and digital freedoms. He also continues to participate in environmental activities and initiatives for peace in the Middle East.

== Political career ==
=== The 2004 general election ===
As a result of the electoral agreement between the PSOE and the Confederation of Greens (supported by José María Mendiluce, among others, although not unanimously within the Confederation), Hammerstein was the coordinator of Els Verds in the joint campaign in the Valencian Community, participating in press conferences alongside Leire Pajín in Alicante and other leaders of the PSPV in Valencia.

=== Member of the European Parliament (2004-2009) ===
That same year, as a result of the same political association agreement, Hammerstein was elected MEP as number 20 on the PSOE list. He joined the Greens/EFA parliamentary group, which consisted of 42 MEPs out of a total of 785. In Parliament, he was a full member of the Committee on Petitions (which promotes direct citizen participation) and the Committee on Industry, Research, and Energy, where he specialized in issues such as the internet, telecommunications, intellectual property, scientific research, renewable energies, and toxic substances.

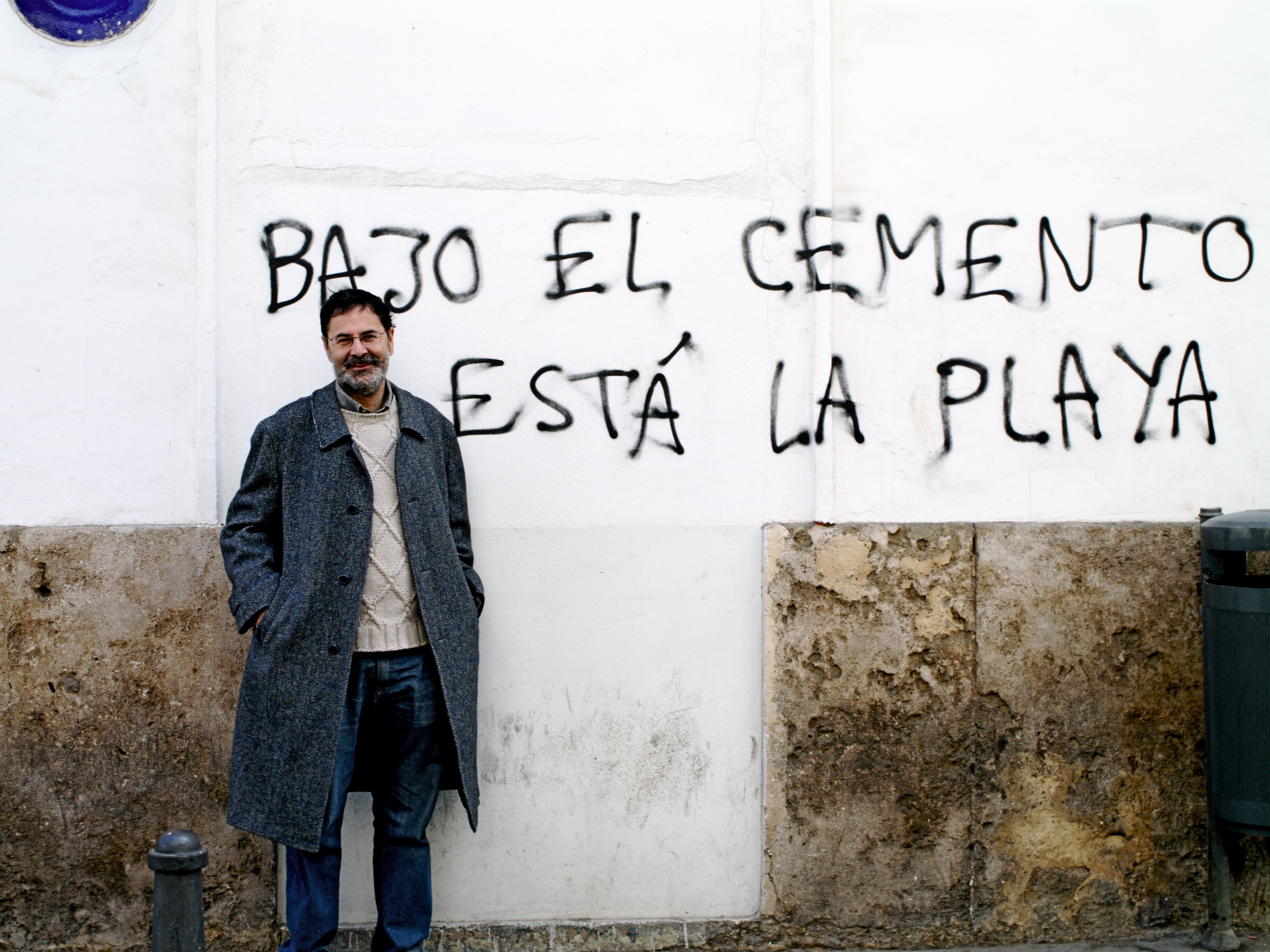
Photo denouncing massive urban development on the Spanish coast.

He was also a substitute member of the Foreign Affairs Committee and specialized in the Middle East conflict, participating in various official and unofficial delegations to Israel, the Palestinian Territories, Lebanon, and Syria. He also participated in the Euro-Mediterranean Assembly and the Delegations for Israel and Palestine, and was vice-chair of the Parliament's Animal Welfare Intergroup.

In Hammerstein's own words during the legislative session: I try to cover the whole of Spain when there is no other political representative willing to represent environmental or neighborhood concerns, which happens very often. It is not easy, given the enormous number of citizen demands that I try to channel to the European institutions [...] I have submitted many and varied parliamentary questions on these issues.

== Career ==
- 1999-2003: Environmental adviser
- 1998-2003: Spokesman for Els Verds del País Valencià (Valencian Greens)
- 2000-2004: International spokesman for Los Verdes (Spanish Greens)
- 2000-2004: Spanish delegate to the European Federation of Green Parties/European Greens

== See also ==
- 2004 European Parliament election in Spain
