= José Javier Pomés Ruiz =

Spanish politician (born 1952)

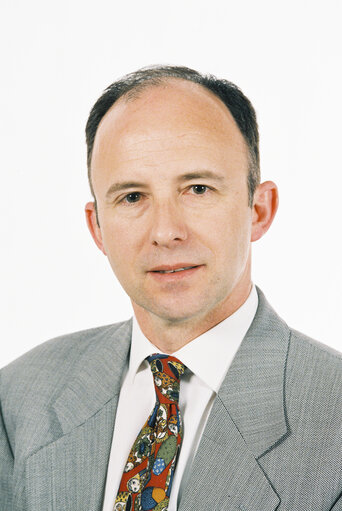
Pomés Ruiz in 2003

José Javier Pomés Ruiz (born 12 March 1952 in Pamplona, Navarra) was a Spanish politician and Member of the European Parliament with the People's Party, Member of the Bureau of the European People's Party and sat on the European Parliament's Committee on Budgetary Control and its Committee on Development.

He was a substitute for the Committee on Budgets, substitute for the Delegation to the EU-Chile Joint Parliamentary Committee.

== Education ==
- Graduate in law, University of Navarre
- Master's degree in economics and business administration, IESE Business School, Barcelona
- Seventeen years' experience in the private financial and business sector
- Former Secretary of UPN, member of the Parliament of Navarre
- held the portfolio for economics and finance in the Government of Navarre

== Career ==
- 1977-1979 Compañía Navarra de Autobuses. Director General. Pamplona.
- 1979-1982 Confederación Española de Sociedades de Garantía Reciproca. Director General, Madrid.
- 1982-1991 Lawyer. Pamplona.
- 1991-1993 Regional Minister of Economics, Budget an taxes. Gobierno de Navarra, Pamplona.
- 1993-1994 and 1996-2009: Member of the European Parliament

See alsoer: 2004 European Parliament election in Spain

- 2009-2011 : General Adviser, Core Team of European Parliament President. Brussels
- 2012-2014 : Lawyer and Public Affaires Consultor. London
- 2015-today: Lawyer and Public Affaires Consultor. Lisboa.
