= Luis de Grandes Pascual =

Spanish politician (born 1945)

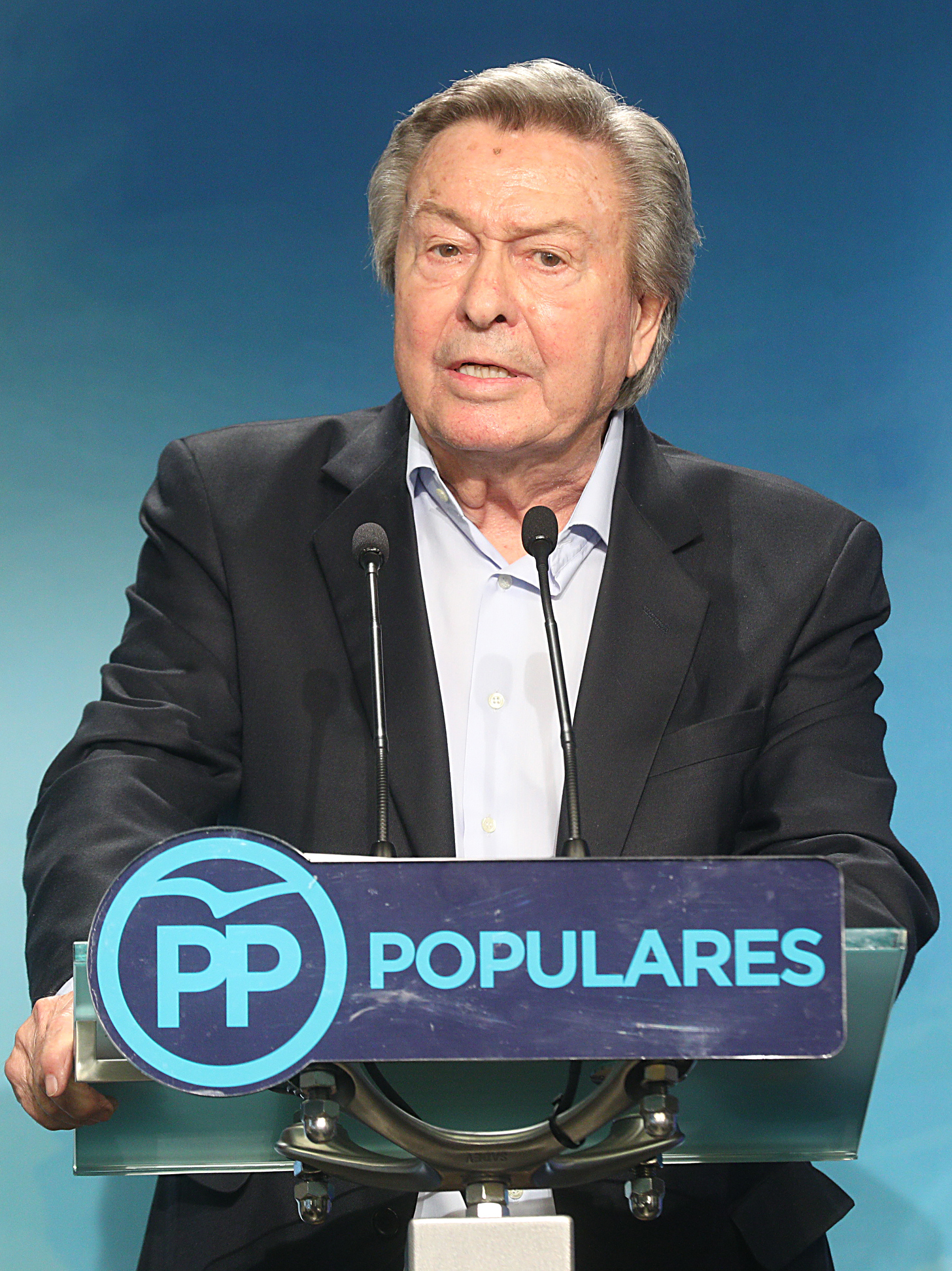
Luis de Grandes (2018).

Luis de Grandes Pascual (born 27 January 1945 in Guadalajara) is a Spanish politician and Member of the European Parliament with the People's Party (PP), part of the European People's Party and sits on the European Parliament's Committee on Transport and Tourism.

He is a substitute for the Committee on Legal Affairs, a member of the Delegation to the EU-Chile Joint Parliamentary Committee and a substitute for the Delegation for relations with the countries of Central America.

Grandes entered politics in 1977 when he was elected as a UCD deputy for Guadalajara in the Spanish General Election. He was re-elected in 1979 but lost his seat at the 1982 election. When the UCD disbanded in February 1983, he joined the Democratic Popular Party (PDP) and returned to Congress at the 1986 election. The PDP merged with other parties in 1989 to form the current PP, for whom he was re-elected at the 1989, 1993, 1996, 2000 and 2004 General Elections.

== Education ==
- Graduate in law
- Law degree and doctoral studies (Law Faculty, Complutense University, Madrid)
- Practising lawyer and member of the bar associations of Guadalajara and Alcalá de Henares (Madrid)
- Secretary-General for Youth in the National Executive of the UCD party
- UCD National Organisation Secretary
- National Secretary-General of the Christian Democrats (PDP)
- Member of the PP National Executive Committee
- Chairman of the PP Provincial and Regional Electoral Committee

== Career ==
- 1983-1987 and 1991-1995: Member of the Regional Parliament of Castile-La Mancha and spokesman of the PP parliamentary group
- 1996-2000 and 2000-2004: Member of the Spanish Congress of Deputies (1977–1979, 1979–1982, 1986–1989, 1993–1996
- 1996-2004: Spokesman for the PP parliamentary group in the Spanish Congress of Deputies
- 1977-1979: Third Secretary of the Bureau of the Chamber of Deputies and member of the Constitutional Committee in the Constituent Assembly
- Patron of the Foundation for Analysis and Social Studies and of the Foundation for Humanism and Democracy

== Decorations ==
- Order of Constitutional Merit (Spain)
- Order of Bernardo O'Higgins (Chile)

== See also ==
- 2004 European Parliament election in Spain
