= Inés Ayala =

Spanish politician (1957–2024)

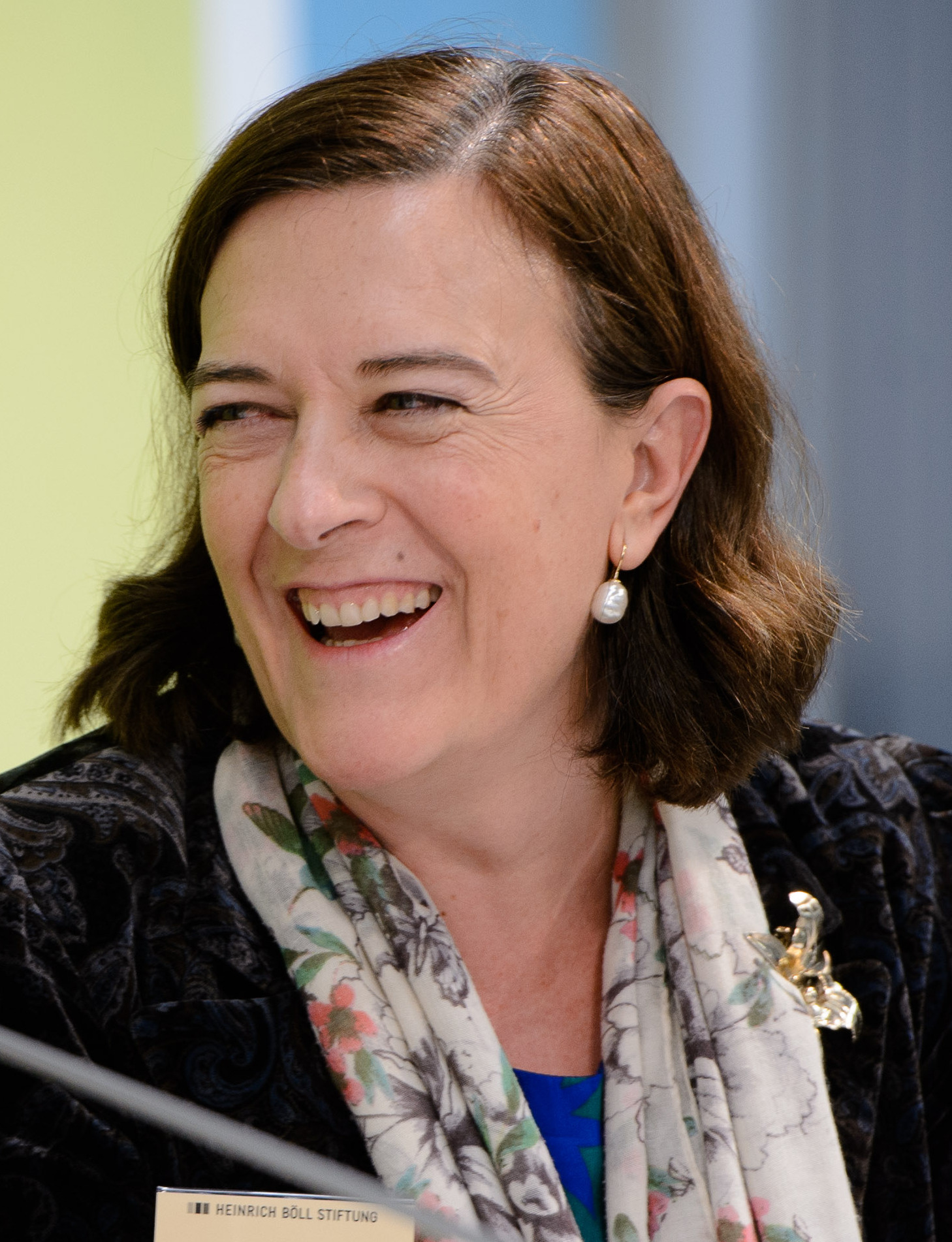
- Ayala Sender in March 2014

Member of the European Parliament
- In office 2004–2019

Personal details
- Born: Inés Ayala Sender; 28 March 1957 Zaragoza, Spain
- Died: 25 July 2024 (aged 67)
- Party: Spanish Socialist Workers' Party

Inés Ayala Sender (28 March 1957 – 25 July 2024) was a Spanish politician who served as a Member of the European Parliament (MEP) from 2004 until 2019 for the Spanish Socialist Workers' Party, which is affiliated to the Party of European Socialists. She was first elected to the European Parliament in 2004, and was re-elected in 2009 and 2014.

She was also member of the City Council of Zaragoza between 2019 and 2023. From January 2021 Mrs Ayala Sender held the position as the European Coordinator for the TEN-T Rhine–Danube corridor.

== Early career ==
Ayala Sender served as national expert in the Directorate-General for the Environment of the European Commission from 1995 to 1997. Between 1997 and 2004, she worked as policy adviser to the PES Group for various committees and delegations of the European Parliament, including the Committee on Transport and Tourism.

== Member of the European Parliament (2004–2019) ==
Ayala Sender first became a Member of the European Parliament in the 2004 European elections. Throughout her time in parliament, she served on the Committee on Budgetary Control and on the Committee on Transport and Tourism. On the Committee on Budgetary Control, she was the coordinator of the Progressive Alliance of Socialists and Democrats. In 2007, she joined the parliament's delegation for relations with the countries of Central America. Between 2005 and 2009, she was a member of the Committee on Petitions.

On the Committee on Budgetary Control, Ayala Sender served as her parliamentary group's coordinator from 2014 until 2019. She was also a member of the Democracy Support and Election Coordination Group (DEG), which oversees the Parliament's election observation missions.

In addition to her committee assignments, Ayala Sender was also a member of the European Parliament Intergroup on Integrity (Transparency, Anti-Corruption and Organized Crime).

== Other activities ==
- European Transport Safety Council, Observer
- Globe EU, Member
- Rail Forum Europe, Member
- SmartMove High Level Group (HLG), Member

== Death ==
Ayala died on 25 July 2024, at the age of 67.
