= Bernard (disambiguation) =

Bernard is a given name and a family name.

Bernard may also refer to:

== Places ==
- Bernard, Iowa, United States, a city
- Bernard (crater), on Mars

== Other uses ==
- Bernard Brewery, a Czech family brewery
- Société des Avions Bernard, a French aircraft manufacturer
- Bernard Terminal, a bus terminal in Richmond Hill, Ontario, Canada
- Bernard School, a school for Black students in McMinnville, Tennessee, United States, from 1922 to 1966
- Bernard (TV series), a short animated TV series
- Bernard's Watch, a British children's TV series later known as Bernard
- "Bernard", a song from the album Kilowatt by Kazumi Watanabe

== See also ==
- Barnard (disambiguation)
- Bernat (disambiguation)
- Bernhard (disambiguation)
- San Bernardino (disambiguation)
- São Bernardo (disambiguation)
- Saint Bernard (disambiguation)
