= Bernat Sanjuan =

Bernat Sanjuan (1915 in Barcelona – 1979 in Deià) was a Catalan painter and sculptor.

Skilled in the depiction of Mediterranean landscapes, he is also the author of many excellent portraits and still lifes. In the fifties he traveled to France where he met Picasso. A French art critic called Sanjuan "le peintre des rouges", because of his use of red colour.

Many exhibitions were made of Sanjuan's work during the sixties and seventies, and up to present. His paintings and sculptures can be seen in many points of Catalonia, Mallorca, and Spain. A fair amount of his work belongs to private collections in Spain and the United States.

Sanjuan developed his own techniques in the field of "photography without camera" (based in the direct manipulation of photographic film), a few of which remain unknown due to his death. He also made contributions to religious art with paintings, sculptures and ceramics, and to book illustration: for instance, he illustrated a Spanish edition of Ayn Rand's The Fountainhead.
