= Bernat Pomar =

- Born: 1932 Palma, Majorca
- Died: 2011 (aged 78–79)
- Occupation(s): Violinist, composer
- Instrument: Violin

Bernat Pomar (Palma, 1932-2011) was a Mallorcan composer and violinist. His best known work is the Suite de danses de Mallorca.
