= Bernardakis =

Bernardakis Greek: Βερναρδάκης or Μπερναρδάκης) is a Greek surname. It is transliterated Bernardakes, but depending on the original Greek spelling, it sometimes transcribes as Vernardakis given the phonetic values of Modern Greek; nevertheless, given the prominence of many of its bearers outside Greece as well as within, before and after the development of more modern transcription systems, it is often Latinised using a hybrid system. At least one bearer of the name has it spelled in Greek with both the Β and Μπ variants, which can give two different orthographic transcriptions regardless of the system used. Notable bearers of the surname include:

- Christophoros Vernardakis, Greek political scientist, Alternate Minister of Administrative Reform in the Second Cabinet of Alexis Tsipras
- Demetrios Bernardakis, Greek playwright, brother of Gregorios
- Dimitrios Bernardakis (Vernardakis), Greek merchant and philanthropist; benefactor of the National and Kapodistrian University of Athens
- Gregorios Bernardakis (1848–1925), classical philologist, brother of Demetrios
- Demetrios Bernardakis (philologist), classical philologist, son of Gregorios
- Panagiotis Bernardakis, classical philologist; son of Demetrios (philologist), grandson of Gregorios
