= Bernard (crater) =

Crater on Mars

- Bernard crater based on day-time THEMIS image
- Planet: Mars
- Coordinates: 23.4°S 154.2°W
- Quadrangle: Memnonia
- Diameter: 128 km
- Eponym: P. Bernard, a French atmospheric scientist

Bernard is a large crater in the Memnonia quadrangle of Mars, located at 23.4° south latitude and 154.2° west longitude. It is 128 km in diameter and was named after P. Bernard, a French atmospheric scientist. The floor of the crater contains large cracks, which may be due to erosion.

== Appearance ==
Impact craters generally have a rim with ejecta around them, in contrast volcanic craters usually do not have a rim or ejecta deposits. As craters get larger (greater than 10 km in diameter) they usually have a central peak. The peak is caused by a rebound of the crater floor following the impact. If one measures the diameter of a crater, the original depth can be estimated with various ratios.

Because of this relationship, researchers have found that many Martian craters contain a great deal of material; much of it is believed to be ice deposited when the climate was different. Sometimes craters expose layers that were buried. Rocks from deep underground are tossed onto the surface. Hence, craters can show us what lies deep under the surface.

== Gallery ==
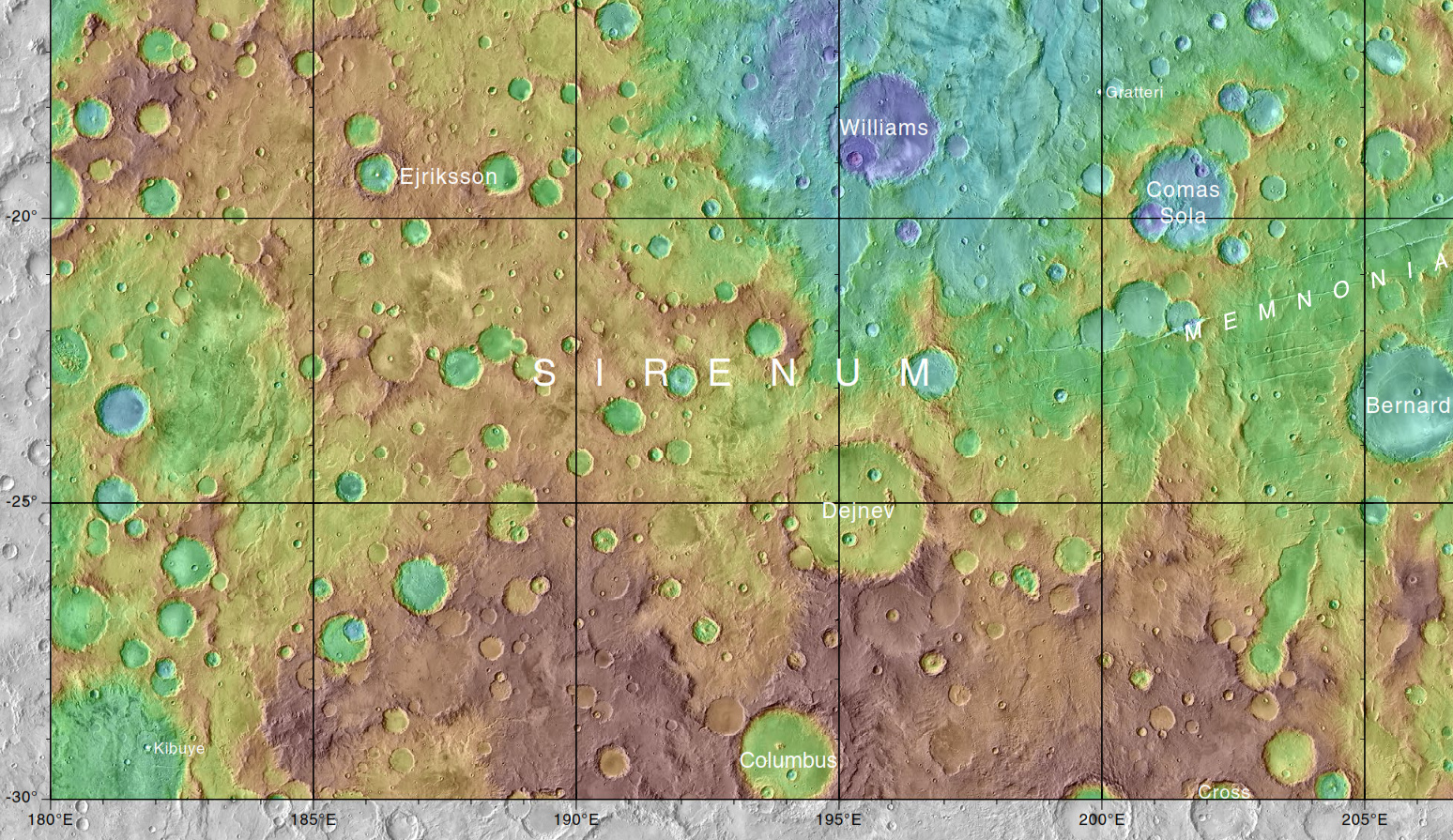
Map showing the relative positions of Bernard Crater and other nearby craters in Memnonia quadrangle

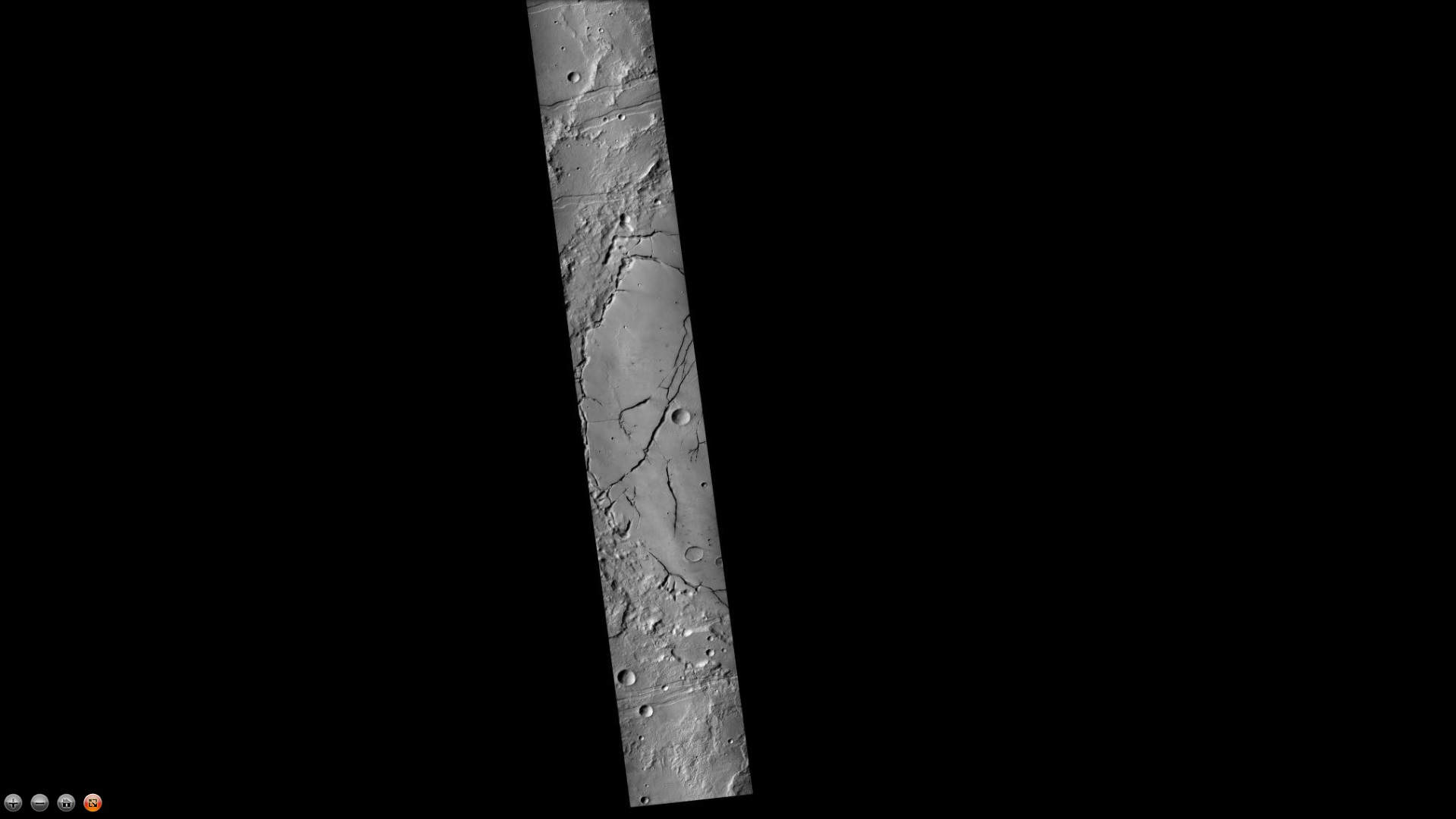
West side of Bernard Crater, as seen by CTX camera (on Mars Reconnaissance Orbiter).

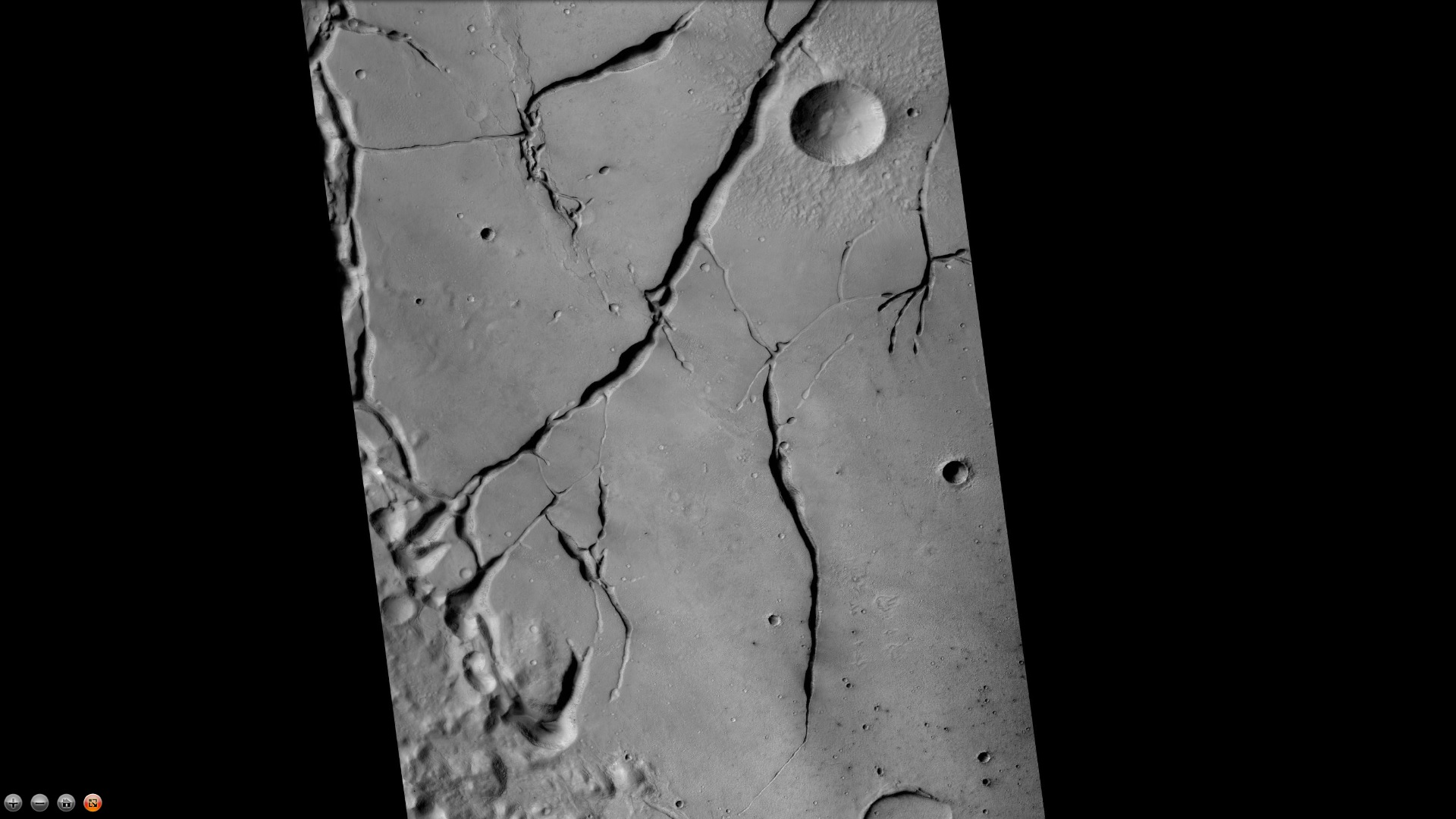
Close-up of part of floor of Bernard Crater, as seen by CTX camera (on Mars Reconnaissance Orbiter).

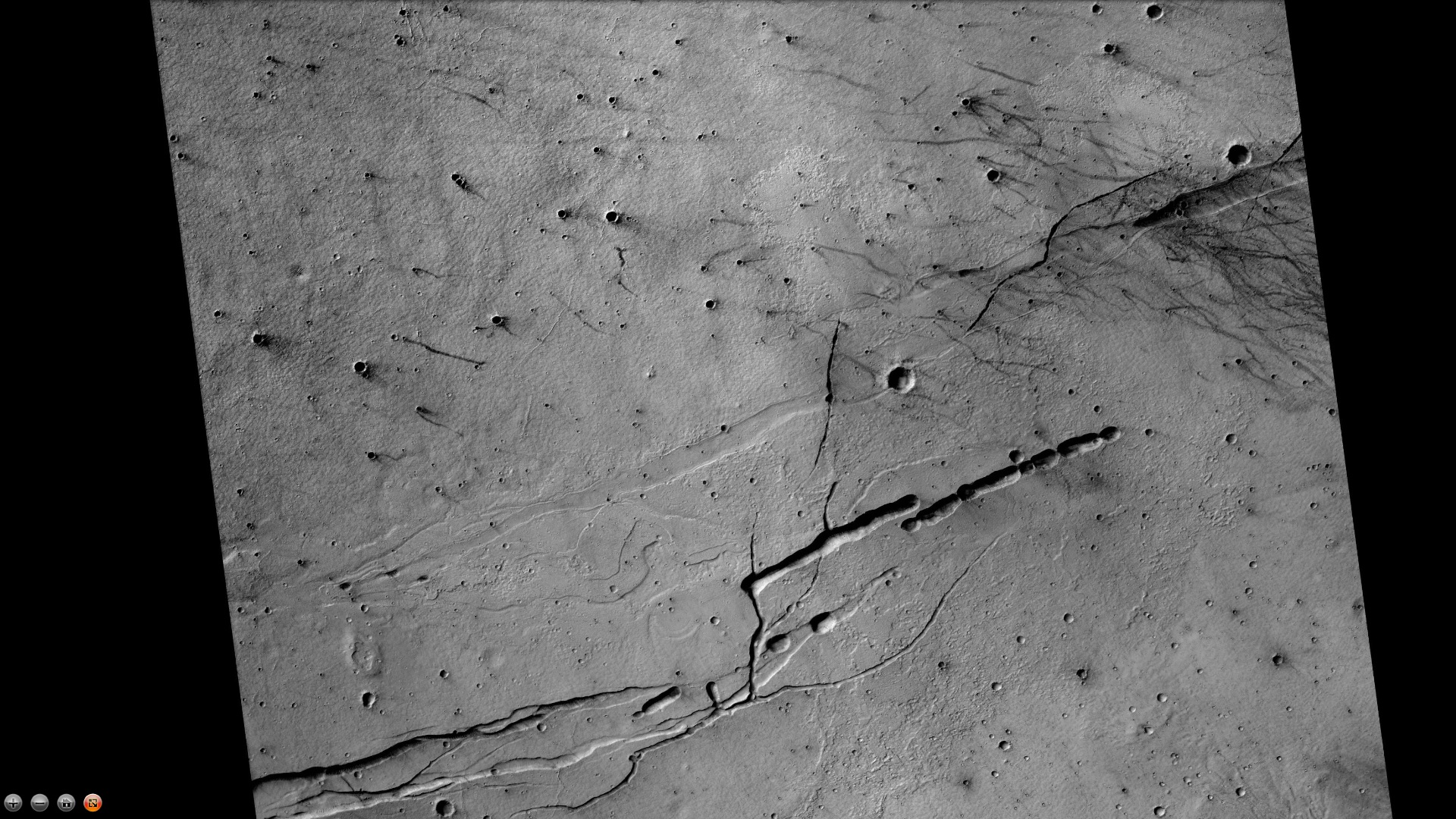
Close-up of part of floor of Bernard Crater showing troughs and dust devil tracks, as seen by CTX camera (on Mars Reconnaissance Orbiter).

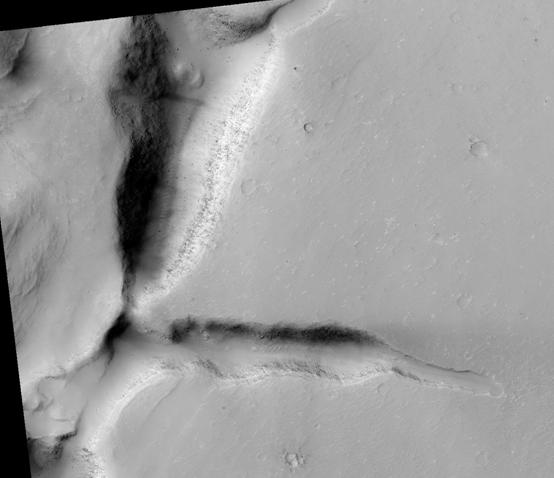
Bernard Crater Floor, as seen by HiRISE. Large cracks are visible on floor.

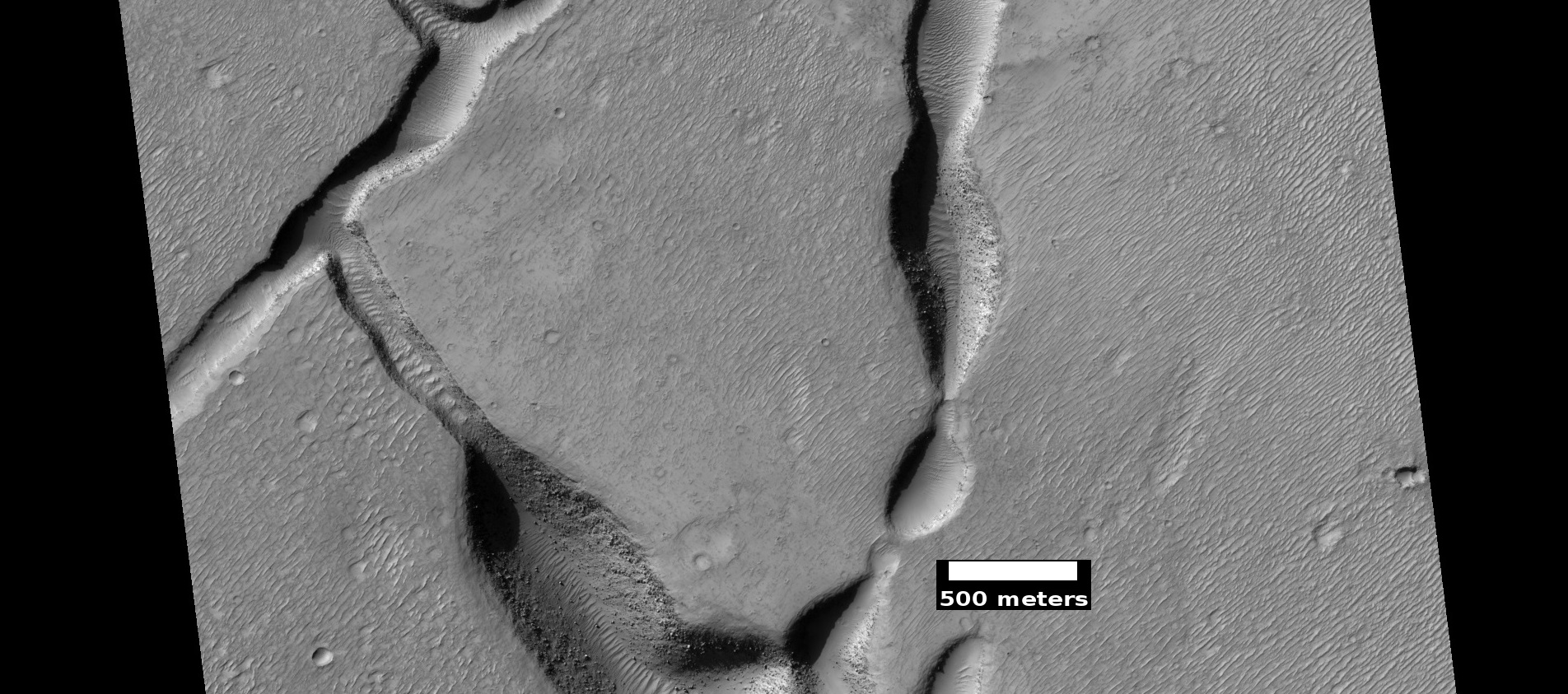
Troughs on the floor of Bernard Crater showing many boulders, as seen by HiRISE under HiWish program

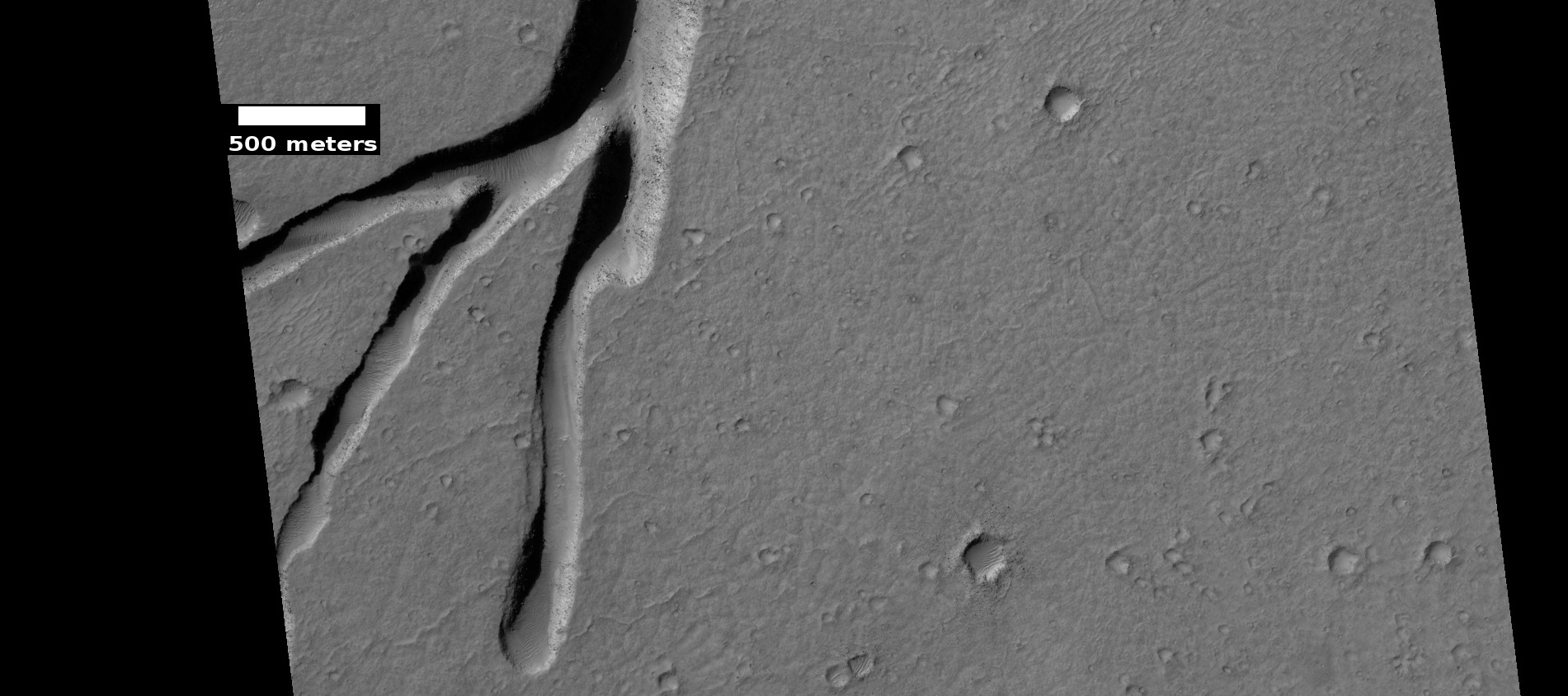
Troughs on the floor of Bernard Crater, as seen by HiRISE under HiWish program

== See also ==
- List of craters on Mars
