= Bernhard (disambiguation) =

Bernhard is a given name.

Bernhard may also refer to:

- Bernhard (surname)

== Places ==
- Sankt Bernhard-Frauenhofen, Austria; a town
- Sankt Bernhard, Thuringia, Germany; a municipality in Thuringia
- Sànkt Bernhàrd, Alsace, France

== Other ==
- Bernhard-Theater Zürich, a theater in Zürich, Switzerland
- Operation Bernhard, a German World War II plot to destabilise the British economy by flooding the country with forged money
- Regiment Stoottroepen Prins Bernhard, an infantry regiment of the Royal Netherlands Army

== See also ==
- Saint Bernard (disambiguation)
- Barnard (disambiguation)
- Bernard (disambiguation)
