= Ignasi Guardans =

Spanish politician (born 1964)

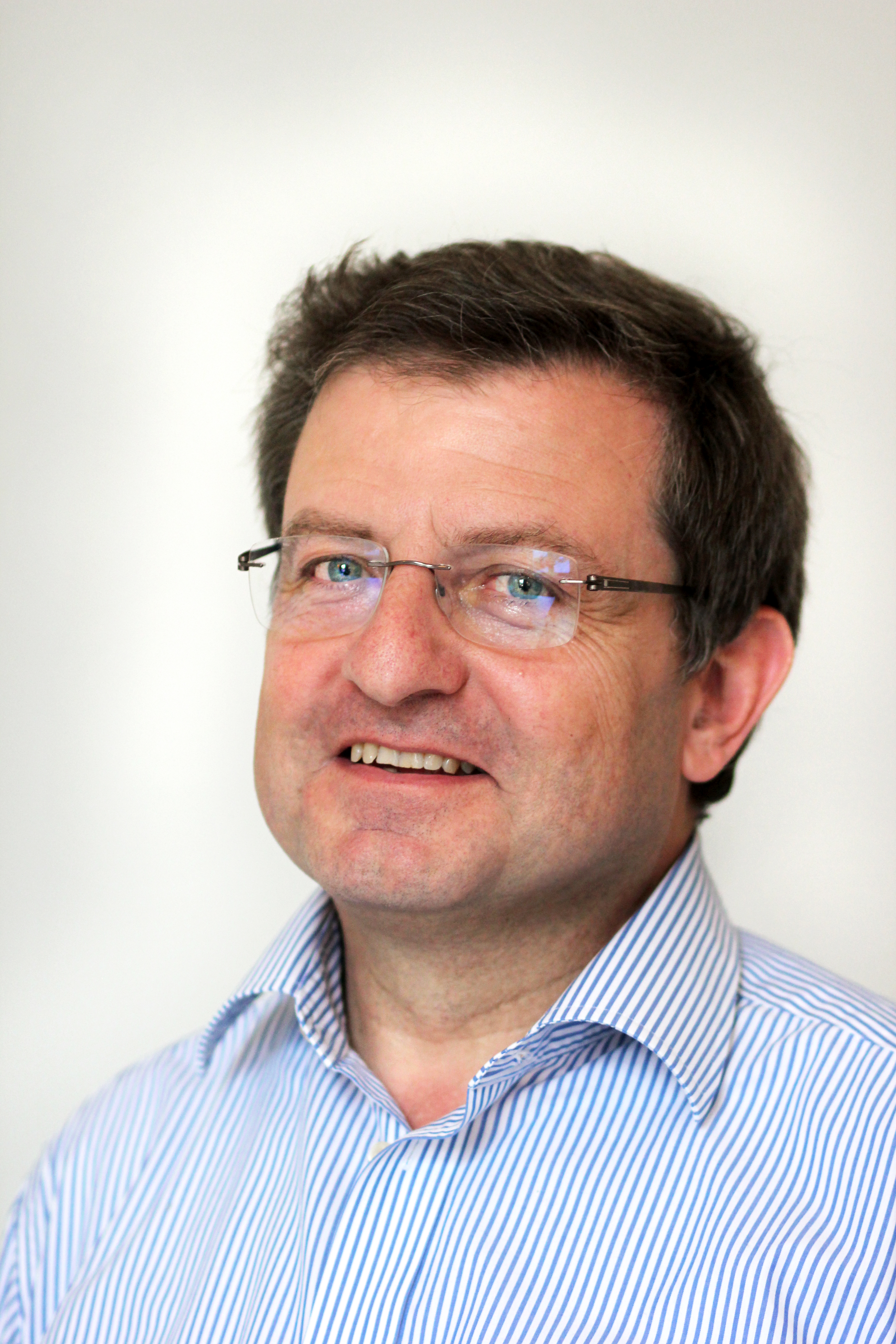

Member of the European Parliament
- In office 2004–2009
- Constituency: Spain

Member of the Congress of Deputies
- In office 1996–2004
- Constituency: Barcelona

Member of the Parliament of Catalonia
- In office 1995–1996
- Constituency: Barcelona

Personal details
- Born: Ignasi Guardans i Cambó; 18 May 1964 (age 62) Barcelona, Catalonia, Spain
- Party: Democratic Convergence of Catalonia (until 2010)
- Parent(s): Ramon Guardans i Vallès; Helena Cambó i Mallol
- Education: University of Navarre

Ignasi Guardans i Cambó (Catalan pronunciation: [iŋˈnazi ɣwəɾˈðans i kəmˈbo]; born on 18 May 1964 in Barcelona, Catalonia) is a Spanish former politician, currently an independent figure still present in the Spanish media and public opinion. He is one of the 14 grandsons of Francesc Cambó.

== Life ==
He started his professional career in the academic and legal research at the University of Navarra, specialising in private international law. In 1992 he moved back to Barcelona and started teaching at its then main law school (Facultat de Dret, Universitat de Barcelona). A few years later he joined a law firm as senior associate lawyer, and for some years he mixed his legal practice with the first steps in a political career. In 1995 he was elected to the Catalan Parliament. But after a few months, in March 2004 he run as candidate for the Spanish Parliament, or Congreso delos Diputados, where he would seat for two consecutive terms, 1996-2000 and 2000-2004. He assumed different responsibilities, mostly in the areas of Foreign Affairs, Culture, and Justice & Legal Affairs. During the same period he joined the Parliamentary Assembly of the Council of Europe and its Committee for Legal Affairs and Human Rights. His tasks included the screening of candidates to Judges of the European Court of Human Rights. In 2004 he ran as candidate for the European Parliament, heading a joined candidacy of the main parties from Catalonia, the Basque Country and Galicia called GALEUSCA. As a Member of the European Parliament he joined the Alliance of Liberals and Democrats for Europe (ALDE), and he assumed different activities and responsibilities in particular in the areas of Culture and Media (CULT), Justice & Home Affairs (LIBE), and International Trade (INTA), where he was the Committee's Vice Chair. He was an active member of the Transatlantic Legislators Dialogue as well of the Delegation for the South Eastern Balkans. He took part as Observer in several international Elections’ Observation missions, including Russia, Palestine, Serbia & Montenegro, and East Timor. Anecdotically, Ignasi Guardans was in Mumbai during the 26 November 2008 Mumbai terror attacks, as the head of a 36-strong European Parliament Delegation. He was not injured.

In 2009, following a strong disagreement with the leadership of his party on the status of Catalonia within Spain, and rejecting to assume Catalonia's full independence as a political goal, he lost the confidence of his party to be promoted again as candidate to the EP. In a surprising decision, a few weeks before the end of the Parliament's Term, he was designated by the Spanish Government as Director General of Spain’s Instituto de la Cinematografía y de las Artes Audiovisuales (ICAA), the Spanish Film Agency. This indirectly included other national and international responsibilities, such as the Presidency of the finance company Audiovisual SGR (today CREA SGR); or the active Membership of the EFADs in Europe, or the Conference of Latin American Film Authorities or CAACI in Latin America. Following discrepancies with the then Minister of Culture, Ángeles González-Sinde his mandate was called to an end in early December 2010.

In 2011 he was appointed the first Director for Public Affairs & Member Relations at the European Broadcasting Union (EBU-UER). Among his tasks he was charged with the management of a Solidarity Program in support of Mediterranean Broadcasters during the Arab Spring. Guardans later moved to Brussels as an independent consultant. Between 2014 and 2014 he channeled his consulting activities in European Public Affairs (mostly in the areas of trade and digital regulation and policy) as a Partner of a global law firm, K&L Gates LLP in its Brussels Office. Among other tasks, he acted as Director in Europe for the TransAtlantic Business Council (TABC), as the European counterpart to his then colleague former Congressman Bart Gordon. In parallel, through CUMEDIAE, a non-profit organization specialized in advice and project management in the field of media and the creative sector he co-founded, he has been involved in a number of projects and consulting activities for the arts and for culture and development in different areas such as Film Literacy, gender equality in the media in the South Mediterranean or the best identification of cultural indicators.

Politically, Guardans terminated any party membership in 2010 when he left Convergència Democràtica de Catalunya (CDC), a party he had joined in 1992. Ignasi Guardans has remained a politically independent figure afterwards, but has attracted some controversy among part of his former political constituency as he opposes the claim for Catalan independence and many of his former political colleagues have moved towards direct opposition to the current status.

In the media, Guardans has had a regular presence for many years: for 12 years he was a weekly analyst at the radio talkshow La Ventana; for several years he contributed to the public broadcaster morning show Los desayunos de TVE; and since 2017 he comments live on a weekly basis at El Gabinete (Onda Cero) and at Hora 25 (Cadena Ser). He has been a regular Op-Ed contributor to newspapers such as La Vanguardia, El País and El Periódico de Catalunya.

== Education ==
- Degree in law (University of Navarre)
- Doctorate in law. His PhD research ("tesis doctoral") was a comparative case law study in the impact of so-called third countries mandatory laws, such as embargoes or other compulsory laws on the validity and enforceability of international trade contracts. It was subsequently published in 1992 under the title "Contrato internacional y derecho imperativo extranjero" (Pamplona, Editorial Aranzadi, ISBN 9788470167713)

== Career ==
- 1987-1992: Deputy Director of the European Documentation Centre (Pamplona)
- 1988-1992: Lecturer in private international law, University of Navarre
- 1992-1996: Professor at the University of Barcelona and Abat Oliba Study Centre)
- 1993-2004: Practising Lawyer (Barcelona)
- 1995: Elected Member of the Catalan Regional Parliament Parliament's Official Journal
- 1996-2004: Elected Member of the Spanish Parliament or Congreso delos Diputados for Barcelona. Spokesman on various committees, including the Joint Committee on the European Union (1996–2004), the Committee on Foreign Affairs (1996–2004) and the Committee on Education and Culture (200-2004)
- 1996-2004: Member of COSAC
- 1997-2004: Member of the Parliamentary Assembly of the Council of Europe
- 1998-2004: Member of the Assembly of the Western European Union
- 2004-2009: Member of the European Parliament
- 2009-2010: Director general Instituto de la Cinematografía y de las Artes Audiovisuales, ICAA, Ministerio de Cultura
- 2011: Director for public affairs and member relations, EBU/UER
- 2012 - ... Independent consultant
- 2017-2019: co-director, Trans Atlantic Business Council

== Decorations ==
- Orden del Mérito Civil, or Order of the Civil Merit, Ministry of Foreign Affairs, Spain
- Chevalier de l'Ordre des Ordre des Arts et des Lettres, Ministry of Culture, France.
