= Freeman Barnardo =

English cricketer

Freeman Frederick Thomas Barnardo (16 May 1918 – 25 October 1942) was an English first-class cricketer who was born in Bombay, British India, and educated at Eton and Magdalene College, Cambridge. He played in one first-class match for Middlesex and also one first-class match for Cambridge as a right-handed batsman in 1939. In his three innings, he had one score of 75 and two of nought.

He died on active service with the Queen's Bays 2nd Dragoon Guards during the Second World War, ten miles west of El Alamein in Egypt, aged 24. At the time of his death he held the rank of Lieutenant and rests in the care of the Commonwealth War Graves Commission at the El Alamein War Cemetery.
