= Hugo Eyre =

Spanish footballer

Personal information
- Full name: Hugo Eyre Bernat
- Date of birth: 7 May 1994 (age 32)
- Place of birth: Barcelona, Spain
- Height: 1.84 m (6 ft 0 in)
- Position: Goalkeeper

Team information
- Current team: Santa Croce

Youth career
- 2005–2010: Damm
- 2010–2012: Badalona
- 2012–2013: Damm

Senior career*
| Years | Team | Apps | (Gls) |
| 2013–2014 | Santboià | 17 | (0) |
| 2014–2017 | Albacete B | 81 | (0) |
| 2015–2017 | Albacete | 2 | (0) |
| 2018–2019 | Guadalajara | 7 | (0) |
| 2020 | Formentera | 5 | (0) |
| 2021–2022 | Virtus Ispica | | |
| 2022–2023 | Pro Favara | | |
| 2023– | Santa Croce | | |
- * Club domestic league appearances and goals as of 26 October 2023

Hugo Eyre Bernat (born 7 May 1994) is a Spanish footballer who plays as a goalkeeper for Italian club UPD Santa Croce.

== Club career ==
Born in Barcelona, Catalonia, Eyre finished his graduation with CF Damm. In August 2013 he moved to FC Santboià, and made his debuts as a senior with the side during the campaign, in Tercera División.

In the 2014 summer, Eyre moved to Albacete Balompié, being initially assigned to the reserves also in the fourth tier. On 19 September 2015 he made his first team debut, coming on as a first-half substitute for field player Mario Ortiz in a 1–1 away draw against CD Mirandés, after Héctor Pizana was sent off; he also saved a penalty during the match.

On 28 December 2017, Eyre terminated his contract with Alba. In September 2018, he signed for CD Guadalajara also in the fourth tier.

On 21 December 2019, after nearly six months without a club, Eyre agreed to a contract with fellow fourth tier side SD Formentera. He then spent a year unemployed before joining Italian Eccellenza side USD Virtus Ispica in September 2021.

On 6 September 2022, Eyre signed for SSD Pro Favara 1984 also in the Italian regional leagues.
