= Bernat Joan i Marí =

Spanish politician

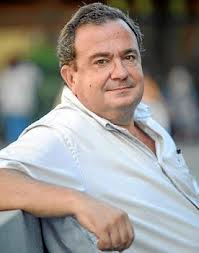
Bernat Joan i Marí

Bernat Joan i Marí (born 22 February 1960 in Ibiza, Balearic Islands, Spain) was a Member of the European Parliament with the Esquerra Republicana de Catalunya, part of the European Free Alliance and sat on the European Parliament's Committee on Culture and Education.

He was a substitute for the Committee on Development, a vice-chair of the Delegation to the ACP-EU Joint Parliamentary Assembly and a substitute for the Delegation for relations with the Maghreb countries and the Arab Maghreb Union (including Libya).

== Education ==
- Graduate in Catalan Philology
- Doctor in Catalan Philology

== Career ==
- 1993-1996: Vice-president of the ERC National Council
- President of the ERC in the Balearic Islands
- Professor of Catalan Language and Literature
- Lecturer in the field of retraining at the Institute of Educational Science, University of the Balearic Islands
- Lecturer at the Universitat Catalana d'Estiu (Catalan Summer University)
- Member of the Social Council for the Catalan Language (Balearic Islands)
- Researcher in the field of sociolinguistics
- Author of essays including Normalitat lingüística i llibertat nacional (Linguistic normalcy and national liberty), Integració nacional i evolució electoral (National integration and electoral evolution), and Una altra Europa és possible (Another Europe is possible), as well as novels and theatrical works.

== Trivia ==
In December 2006, he contributed to the Flemish Secession hoax, by giving an interview in which he congratulated Flemings for their purported independence.

He is a supporter of the Campaign for the Establishment of a United Nations Parliamentary Assembly, an organisation which campaigns for democratic reform in the United Nations.
