= Results of the 1999 European Parliament election in Spain =

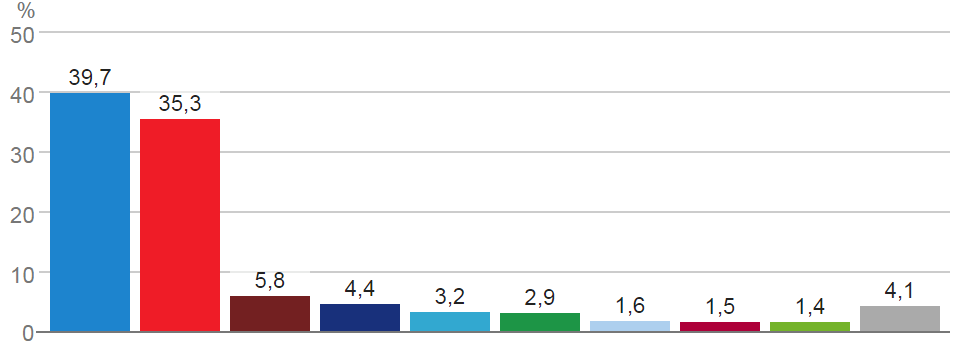
| (Spain) | Main: 1999 European Parliament election in Spain |
← 1994 13 June 1999 2004 →
| Party | | Votes | % | Seats |
| | PP | 8,410,993 | 39.7% | 27 |
| | PSOE–p | 7,477,823 | 35.3% | 24 |
| | IU–EUiA | 1,221,566 | 5.8% | 4 |
| | CiU | 937,687 | 4.4% | 3 |
| | CE | 677,094 | 3.2% | 2 |
| | CN–EP | 613,968 | 2.9% | 2 |
| | BNG | 349,079 | 1.6% | 1 |
| | EH | 306,923 | 1.5% | 1 |
| | LV–IP | 300,874 | 1.4% | 0 |
| | Others | 870,257 | 4.1% | 0 |
| Total | | 21,166,264 | 100.0% | 64 |

This article presents the results breakdown of the election to the European Parliament held in Spain on 13 June 1999. The following tables show detailed results in each of the country's 17 autonomous communities and in the autonomous cities of Ceuta and Melilla.

== Nationwide ==
← Summary of the 13 June 1999 European Parliament election results in Spain →
| Parties and alliances | Popular vote | | | Seats | |
| Parties and alliances | Votes | % | ±pp | Total | +/− |
|---|---|---|---|---|---|
| People's Party (PP) | 8,410,993 | 39.74 | −0.38 | 27 | −1 |
| Spanish Socialist Workers' Party–Progressives (PSOE–p) | 7,477,823 | 35.33 | +4.54 | 24 | +2 |
| United Left–United and Alternative Left (IU–EUiA)^{1} | 1,221,566 | 5.77 | −6.15 | 4 | −5 |
| Convergence and Union (CiU) | 937,687 | 4.43 | −0.23 | 3 | ±0 |
| European Coalition (CE)^{2} | 677,094 | 3.20 | +1.03 | 2 | +2 |
| Nationalist Coalition–Europe of the Peoples (CN–EP)^{3} | 613,968 | 2.90 | +0.06 | 2 | ±0 |
| Galician Nationalist Bloc (BNG) | 349,079 | 1.65 | +0.90 | 1 | +1 |
| Basque Citizens (EH)^{4} | 306,923 | 1.45 | +0.48 | 1 | +1 |
| The Greens–Left of the Peoples (LV–IP)^{5} | 300,874 | 1.42 | −0.11 | 0 | ±0 |
| The Greens–Green Group (LV–GV) | 138,835 | 0.66 | +0.07 | 0 | ±0 |
| Centrist Union–Democratic and Social Centre (UC–CDS) | 38,911 | 0.18 | −0.81 | 0 | ±0 |
| Leonese People's Union (UPL) | 33,604 | 0.16 | New | 0 | ±0 |
| Confederation of Feminist Organizations (COFEM/FEMEK) | 28,901 | 0.14 | New | 0 | ±0 |
| Communist Party of the Peoples of Spain (PCPE) | 26,189 | 0.12 | −0.04 | 0 | ±0 |
| Asturian Renewal Union (URAS) | 22,400 | 0.11 | New | 0 | ±0 |
| Party for Independence (PI) | 17,544 | 0.08 | New | 0 | ±0 |
| Spanish Democratic Party (PADE) | 16,001 | 0.08 | New | 0 | ±0 |
| United Extremadura (EU) | 15,716 | 0.07 | ±0.00 | 0 | ±0 |
| Asturianist Party (PAS) | 15,299 | 0.07 | −0.01 | 0 | ±0 |
| Independent Spanish Phalanx (FEI) | 13,940 | 0.07 | +0.04 | 0 | ±0 |
| Commoners' Land–Castilian Nationalist Party (TC–PNC)^{6} | 13,267 | 0.06 | +0.04 | 0 | ±0 |
| Alliance for National Unity (AUN) | 12,486 | 0.06 | New | 0 | ±0 |
| Humanist Party (PH) | 12,415 | 0.06 | +0.02 | 0 | ±0 |
| The Phalanx (FE) | 10,792 | 0.05 | New | 0 | ±0 |
| Independent Socialists of Extremadura (SIEx) | 10,040 | 0.05 | New | 0 | ±0 |
| Regionalist Unity of Castile and León (URCL) | 9,950 | 0.05 | ±0.00 | 0 | ±0 |
| Andalusia Assembly (A) | 8,750 | 0.04 | New | 0 | ±0 |
| Natural Law Party (PLN) | 8,671 | 0.04 | New | 0 | ±0 |
| Party of Self-employed of Spain and Spanish Independent Groups (PAE–I) | 8,394 | 0.04 | New | 0 | ±0 |
| Valencian Community Alternative (ACV) | 8,073 | 0.04 | New | 0 | ±0 |
| National Democracy (DN) | 8,053 | 0.04 | New | 0 | ±0 |
| Andecha Astur (AA) | 7,321 | 0.03 | New | 0 | ±0 |
| Union of Regions (UDR) | 7,251 | 0.03 | New | 0 | ±0 |
| Extremaduran Coalition (PREx–CREx)^{7} | 7,230 | 0.03 | ±0.00 | 0 | ±0 |
| Regionalist Party of the Leonese Country (PREPAL) | 6,977 | 0.03 | ±0.00 | 0 | ±0 |
| Coalition for the Repeal of the Maastricht Treaty (DM)^{8} | 5,664 | 0.03 | −0.01 | 0 | ±0 |
| Blank ballots | 357,583 | 1.69 | +0.54 | | |
| Total | 21,166,264 | | | 64 | ±0 |
| Valid votes | 21,166,264 | 99.21 | −0.33 | | |
| Invalid votes | 168,684 | 0.79 | +0.33 | | |
| Votes cast / turnout | 21,334,948 | 63.05 | +3.91 | | |
| Abstentions | 12,505,484 | 36.95 | −3.91 | | |
| Registered voters | 33,840,432 | | | | |
Sources
Footnotes: ^{1} United Left–United and Alternative Left results are compared to United Left totals in the 1994 election, not including Catalonia.; ^{2} European Coalition results are compared to the combined totals of Nationalist Coalition in Aragon, the Canary Islands and the Valencian Community and Andalusian Coalition–Andalusian Power in the 1994 election.; ^{3} Nationalist Coalition–Europe of the Peoples results are compared to the combined totals of Nationalist Coalition—not including results in Aragon, the Canary Islands, Galicia and the Valencian Community—, For the Europe of the Peoples—not including results in Cantabria, Castile and León, Castilla–La Mancha, La Rioja and Madrid—and The Greens–Ecologist Confederation of Catalonia in the 1994 election.; ^{4} Basque Citizens results are compared to Popular Unity totals in the 1994 election.; ^{5} The Greens–Left of the Peoples results are compared to United Left totals in Catalonia in the 1994 election.; ^{6} Commoners' Land–Castilian Nationalist Party results are compared to For the Europe of the Peoples totals in Cantabria, Castile and León, Castilla–La Mancha, La Rioja and Madrid in the 1994 election.; ^{7} Extremaduran Coalition results are compared to Extremaduran Regionalist Party totals in the 1994 election.; ^{8} Coalition for the Repeal of the Maastricht Treaty results are compared to Coalition for a New Socialist Party totals in the 1994 election.

== Autonomous communities ==
=== Andalusia ===
← Summary of the 13 June 1999 European Parliament election results in Andalusia →
| Parties and alliances | Popular vote | | |
| Parties and alliances | Votes | % | ±pp |
|---|---|---|---|
| Spanish Socialist Workers' Party–Progressives (PSOE–p) | 1,609,861 | 43.29 | +2.22 |
| People's Party (PP) | 1,338,683 | 36.00 | +1.16 |
| United Left/The Greens–Assembly for Andalusia (IULV–CA) | 397,991 | 10.70 | −6.35 |
| Andalusian Party (European Coalition) (PA)^{1} | 246,847 | 6.64 | +2.86 |
| The Greens–Green Group (LV–GV) | 17,067 | 0.46 | +0.09 |
| The Greens–Andalusian Left (Left of the Peoples) (LV–IA) | 14,977 | 0.40 | New |
| Confederation of Feminist Organizations (COFEM/FEMEK) | 4,700 | 0.13 | New |
| Communist Party of the Peoples of Spain (PCPE) | 4,573 | 0.12 | −0.05 |
| Andalusia Assembly (A) | 4,266 | 0.11 | New |
| Centrist Union–Democratic and Social Centre (UC–CDS) | 3,852 | 0.10 | −0.35 |
| Basque Citizens (EH)^{2} | 2,159 | 0.06 | +0.01 |
| Independent Spanish Phalanx (FEI) | 2,129 | 0.06 | +0.03 |
| Humanist Party (PH) | 1,599 | 0.04 | ±0.00 |
| The Phalanx (FE) | 1,537 | 0.04 | New |
| Nationalist Coalition–Europe of the Peoples (CN–EP)^{3} | 1,474 | 0.04 | −0.02 |
| Alliance for National Unity (AUN) | 1,308 | 0.04 | New |
| Galician Nationalist Bloc (BNG) | 1,293 | 0.03 | +0.01 |
| National Democracy (DN) | 1,247 | 0.03 | New |
| Spanish Democratic Party (PADE) | 1,240 | 0.03 | New |
| Party for Independence (PI) | 1,203 | 0.03 | New |
| Convergence and Union (CiU) | 1,182 | 0.03 | ±0.00 |
| Union of Regions (UDR) | 1,154 | 0.03 | New |
| Party of Self-employed of Spain and Spanish Independent Groups (PAE–I) | 1,145 | 0.03 | New |
| Natural Law Party (PLN) | 1,063 | 0.03 | New |
| Independent Socialists of Extremadura (SIEx) | 1,027 | 0.03 | New |
| Andecha Astur (AA) | 962 | 0.03 | New |
| United Extremadura (EU) | 891 | 0.02 | −0.01 |
| Asturianist Party (PAS) | 823 | 0.02 | −0.01 |
| Coalition for the Repeal of the Maastricht Treaty (DM)^{4} | 784 | 0.02 | −0.03 |
| Leonese People's Union (UPL) | 682 | 0.02 | New |
| Regionalist Party of the Leonese Country (PREPAL) | 658 | 0.02 | −0.01 |
| Extremaduran Coalition (PREx–CREx)^{5} | 597 | 0.02 | ±0.00 |
| Asturian Renewal Union (URAS) | 595 | 0.02 | New |
| Regionalist Unity of Castile and León (URCL) | 588 | 0.02 | −0.01 |
| Commoners' Land–Castilian Nationalist Party (TC–PNC) | 556 | 0.01 | New |
| Valencian Community Alternative (ACV) | 549 | 0.01 | New |
| Blank ballots | 47,322 | 1.27 | +0.44 |
| Total | 3,718,584 | | |
| Valid votes | 3,718,584 | 99.16 | −0.24 |
| Invalid votes | 31,454 | 0.84 | +0.24 |
| Votes cast / turnout | 3,750,038 | 63.62 | +3.61 |
| Abstentions | 2,144,339 | 36.38 | −3.61 |
| Registered voters | 5,894,377 | | |
Sources
Footnotes: ^{1} Andalusian Party results are compared to Andalusian Coalition–Andalusian Power totals in the 1994 election.; ^{2} Basque Citizens results are compared to Popular Unity totals in the 1994 election.; ^{3} Nationalist Coalition–Europe of the Peoples results are compared to the combined totals of Nationalist Coalition and For the Europe of the Peoples in the 1994 election.; ^{4} Coalition for the Repeal of the Maastricht Treaty results are compared to Coalition for a New Socialist Party totals in the 1994 election.; ^{5} Extremaduran Coalition results are compared to Extremaduran Regionalist Party totals in the 1994 election.

=== Aragon ===
← Summary of the 13 June 1999 European Parliament election results in Aragon →
| Parties and alliances | Popular vote | | |
| Parties and alliances | Votes | % | ±pp |
|---|---|---|---|
| People's Party (PP) | 275,844 | 42.48 | −2.42 |
| Spanish Socialist Workers' Party–Progressives (PSOE–p) | 218,710 | 33.68 | +4.97 |
| Aragonese Party (European Coalition) (PAR) | 60,186 | 9.27 | +1.58 |
| Aragonese Union–The Greens (Left of the Peoples) (CHA–LV) | 44,494 | 6.85 | New |
| United Left of Aragon (IU) | 25,732 | 3.96 | −9.75 |
| The Greens–Green Group (LV–GV) | 3,176 | 0.49 | −0.06 |
| Convergence and Union (CiU) | 795 | 0.12 | ±0.00 |
| Basque Citizens (EH)^{1} | 695 | 0.11 | +0.01 |
| Centrist Union–Democratic and Social Centre (UC–CDS) | 690 | 0.11 | −0.97 |
| Confederation of Feminist Organizations (COFEM/FEMEK) | 680 | 0.10 | New |
| Independent Spanish Phalanx (FEI) | 466 | 0.07 | +0.04 |
| Communist Party of the Peoples of Spain (PCPE) | 432 | 0.07 | −0.03 |
| Alliance for National Unity (AUN) | 431 | 0.07 | New |
| National Democracy (DN) | 335 | 0.05 | New |
| Humanist Party (PH) | 316 | 0.05 | +0.02 |
| The Phalanx (FE) | 300 | 0.05 | New |
| Party of Self-employed of Spain and Spanish Independent Groups (PAE–I) | 245 | 0.04 | New |
| Natural Law Party (PLN) | 221 | 0.03 | New |
| Nationalist Coalition–Europe of the Peoples (CN–EP) | 191 | 0.03 | New |
| Spanish Democratic Party (PADE) | 188 | 0.03 | New |
| Coalition for the Repeal of the Maastricht Treaty (DM)^{2} | 156 | 0.02 | −0.01 |
| Independent Socialists of Extremadura (SIEx) | 155 | 0.02 | New |
| Galician Nationalist Bloc (BNG) | 154 | 0.02 | ±0.00 |
| United Extremadura (EU) | 152 | 0.02 | −0.02 |
| Leonese People's Union (UPL) | 148 | 0.02 | New |
| Party for Independence (PI) | 123 | 0.02 | New |
| Asturianist Party (PAS) | 117 | 0.02 | −0.01 |
| Regionalist Unity of Castile and León (URCL) | 114 | 0.02 | ±0.00 |
| Valencian Community Alternative (ACV) | 113 | 0.02 | New |
| Union of Regions (UDR) | 113 | 0.02 | New |
| Regionalist Party of the Leonese Country (PREPAL) | 111 | 0.02 | ±0.00 |
| Commoners' Land–Castilian Nationalist Party (TC–PNC) | 99 | 0.02 | New |
| Andalusia Assembly (A) | 84 | 0.01 | New |
| Extremaduran Coalition (PREx–CREx)^{3} | 75 | 0.01 | −0.01 |
| Andecha Astur (AA) | 73 | 0.01 | New |
| Asturian Renewal Union (URAS) | 51 | 0.01 | New |
| Blank ballots | 13,449 | 2.07 | +0.51 |
| Total | 649,414 | | |
| Valid votes | 649,414 | 99.22 | −0.37 |
| Invalid votes | 5,073 | 0.78 | +0.37 |
| Votes cast / turnout | 654,487 | 64.27 | +5.83 |
| Abstentions | 363,878 | 35.73 | −5.83 |
| Registered voters | 1,018,365 | | |
Sources
Footnotes: ^{1} Basque Citizens results are compared to Popular Unity totals in the 1994 election.; ^{2} Coalition for the Repeal of the Maastricht Treaty results are compared to Coalition for a New Socialist Party totals in the 1994 election.; ^{3} Extremaduran Coalition results are compared to Extremaduran Regionalist Party totals in the 1994 election.

=== Asturias ===
← Summary of the 13 June 1999 European Parliament election results in Asturias →
| Parties and alliances | Popular vote | | |
| Parties and alliances | Votes | % | ±pp |
|---|---|---|---|
| Spanish Socialist Workers' Party–Progressives (PSOE–p) | 256,497 | 41.52 | +9.45 |
| People's Party (PP) | 243,576 | 39.43 | −3.17 |
| United Left of Asturias (IU) | 63,912 | 10.35 | −9.14 |
| Asturian Renewal Union (URAS) | 18,579 | 3.01 | New |
| Asturianist Party (PAS) | 10,693 | 1.73 | −0.05 |
| The Greens (The Greens–Left of the Peoples) (LV) | 3,339 | 0.54 | New |
| The Greens–Green Group (LV–GV) | 2,866 | 0.46 | −0.01 |
| Andecha Astur (AA) | 1,467 | 0.24 | New |
| Communist Party of the Peoples of Spain (PCPE) | 814 | 0.13 | −0.05 |
| Basque Citizens (EH)^{1} | 790 | 0.13 | +0.01 |
| Confederation of Feminist Organizations (COFEM/FEMEK) | 714 | 0.12 | New |
| Centrist Union–Democratic and Social Centre (UC–CDS) | 700 | 0.11 | −1.40 |
| Galician Nationalist Bloc (BNG) | 519 | 0.08 | +0.05 |
| The Phalanx (FE) | 276 | 0.04 | New |
| Independent Spanish Phalanx (FEI) | 206 | 0.03 | +0.01 |
| National Democracy (DN) | 201 | 0.03 | New |
| Alliance for National Unity (AUN) | 188 | 0.03 | New |
| Party of Self-employed of Spain and Spanish Independent Groups (PAE–I) | 158 | 0.03 | New |
| Humanist Party (PH) | 155 | 0.03 | ±0.00 |
| Leonese People's Union (UPL) | 153 | 0.02 | New |
| Nationalist Coalition–Europe of the Peoples (CN–EP)^{2} | 142 | 0.02 | −0.02 |
| Convergence and Union (CiU) | 120 | 0.02 | −0.01 |
| Natural Law Party (PLN) | 111 | 0.02 | New |
| Union of Regions (UDR) | 96 | 0.02 | New |
| Spanish Democratic Party (PADE) | 88 | 0.01 | New |
| Coalition for the Repeal of the Maastricht Treaty (DM)^{3} | 87 | 0.01 | −0.02 |
| Regionalist Unity of Castile and León (URCL) | 87 | 0.01 | −0.01 |
| Regionalist Party of the Leonese Country (PREPAL) | 82 | 0.01 | −0.01 |
| Party for Independence (PI) | 80 | 0.01 | New |
| European Coalition (CE) | 78 | 0.01 | New |
| Independent Socialists of Extremadura (SIEx) | 77 | 0.01 | New |
| United Extremadura (EU) | 63 | 0.01 | −0.01 |
| Commoners' Land–Castilian Nationalist Party (TC–PNC) | 62 | 0.01 | New |
| Valencian Community Alternative (ACV) | 57 | 0.01 | New |
| Andalusia Assembly (A) | 55 | 0.01 | New |
| Extremaduran Coalition (PREx–CREx)^{4} | 47 | 0.01 | ±0.00 |
| Blank ballots | 10,635 | 1.72 | +0.77 |
| Total | 617,770 | | |
| Valid votes | 617,770 | 99.47 | −0.16 |
| Invalid votes | 3,305 | 0.53 | +0.16 |
| Votes cast / turnout | 621,075 | 63.35 | +5.15 |
| Abstentions | 359,300 | 36.65 | −5.15 |
| Registered voters | 980,375 | | |
Sources
Footnotes: ^{1} Basque Citizens results are compared to Popular Unity totals in the 1994 election.; ^{2} Nationalist Coalition–Europe of the Peoples results are compared to the combined totals of Nationalist Coalition and For the Europe of the Peoples in the 1994 election.; ^{3} Coalition for the Repeal of the Maastricht Treaty results are compared to Coalition for a New Socialist Party totals in the 1994 election.; ^{4} Extremaduran Coalition results are compared to Extremaduran Regionalist Party totals in the 1994 election.

=== Balearic Islands ===
← Summary of the 13 June 1999 European Parliament election results in the Balearic Islands →
| Parties and alliances | Popular vote | | |
| Parties and alliances | Votes | % | ±pp |
|---|---|---|---|
| People's Party (PP) | 170,083 | 47.10 | −3.46 |
| Spanish Socialist Workers' Party–Progressives (PSOE–p) | 100,023 | 27.70 | +2.85 |
| PSM–Nationalist Agreement of Majorca (CiU–BNV) (PSM–ENM) | 33,295 | 9.22 | +3.25 |
| Majorcan Union (Nationalist Coalition–Europe of the Peoples) (UM) | 20,155 | 5.58 | +2.95 |
| United Left of the Balearic Islands (EU) | 13,538 | 3.75 | −6.12 |
| The Greens (The Greens–Left of the Peoples) (LV) | 5,750 | 1.59 | New |
| The Greens–Green Group (LV–GV) | 4,445 | 1.23 | +0.35 |
| Basque Citizens (EH)^{1} | 989 | 0.27 | +0.16 |
| Centrist Union–Democratic and Social Centre (UC–CDS) | 401 | 0.11 | −0.71 |
| Confederation of Feminist Organizations (COFEM/FEMEK) | 389 | 0.11 | New |
| National Democracy (DN) | 385 | 0.11 | New |
| Communist Party of the Peoples of Spain (PCPE) | 372 | 0.10 | −0.08 |
| Party for Independence (PI) | 354 | 0.10 | New |
| Union of Regions (UDR) | 309 | 0.09 | New |
| Galician Nationalist Bloc (BNG) | 283 | 0.08 | +0.04 |
| Independent Spanish Phalanx (FEI) | 202 | 0.06 | +0.01 |
| Natural Law Party (PLN) | 186 | 0.05 | New |
| The Phalanx (FE) | 179 | 0.05 | New |
| United Extremadura (EU) | 157 | 0.04 | −0.02 |
| Humanist Party (PH) | 156 | 0.04 | ±0.00 |
| European Coalition (CE) | 144 | 0.04 | New |
| Andalusia Assembly (A) | 143 | 0.04 | New |
| Coalition for the Repeal of the Maastricht Treaty (DM)^{2} | 137 | 0.04 | −0.02 |
| Alliance for National Unity (AUN) | 124 | 0.03 | New |
| Regionalist Unity of Castile and León (URCL) | 114 | 0.03 | −0.01 |
| Party of Self-employed of Spain and Spanish Independent Groups (PAE–I) | 113 | 0.03 | New |
| Spanish Democratic Party (PADE) | 112 | 0.03 | New |
| Leonese People's Union (UPL) | 95 | 0.03 | New |
| Regionalist Party of the Leonese Country (PREPAL) | 93 | 0.03 | −0.01 |
| Commoners' Land–Castilian Nationalist Party (TC–PNC) | 89 | 0.02 | New |
| Independent Socialists of Extremadura (SIEx) | 88 | 0.02 | New |
| Andecha Astur (AA) | 87 | 0.02 | New |
| Asturianist Party (PAS) | 86 | 0.02 | −0.05 |
| Extremaduran Coalition (PREx–CREx)^{3} | 77 | 0.02 | ±0.00 |
| Valencian Community Alternative (ACV) | 74 | 0.02 | New |
| Asturian Renewal Union (URAS) | 50 | 0.01 | New |
| Blank ballots | 7,849 | 2.17 | +0.92 |
| Total | 361,126 | | |
| Valid votes | 361,126 | 98.14 | −1.47 |
| Invalid votes | 6,831 | 1.86 | +1.47 |
| Votes cast / turnout | 367,957 | 56.99 | +7.21 |
| Abstentions | 277,745 | 43.01 | −7.21 |
| Registered voters | 645,702 | | |
Sources
Footnotes: ^{1} Basque Citizens results are compared to Popular Unity totals in the 1994 election.; ^{2} Coalition for the Repeal of the Maastricht Treaty results are compared to Coalition for a New Socialist Party totals in the 1994 election.; ^{3} Extremaduran Coalition results are compared to Extremaduran Regionalist Party totals in the 1994 election.

=== Basque Country ===
← Summary of the 13 June 1999 European Parliament election results in the Basque Country →
| Parties and alliances | Popular vote | | |
| Parties and alliances | Votes | % | ±pp |
|---|---|---|---|
| Basque Nationalist Party–Basque Solidarity (CN–EP) (PNV–EA)^{1} | 392,800 | 33.93 | −0.60 |
| People's Party (PP) | 228,688 | 19.76 | +2.28 |
| Socialist Party of the Basque Country–Basque Country Left (PSE–EE (PSOE)) | 226,187 | 19.54 | +1.28 |
| Basque Citizens (EH)^{2} | 225,796 | 19.51 | +3.92 |
| United Left (IU–EB) | 45,617 | 3.94 | −5.62 |
| The Greens (The Greens–Left of the Peoples) (LV) | 4,358 | 0.38 | New |
| Confederation of Feminist Organizations (COFEM/FEMEK) | 2,720 | 0.23 | New |
| The Greens–Green Group (B–GV) | 2,681 | 0.23 | −0.56 |
| Galician Nationalist Bloc (BNG) | 847 | 0.07 | −0.01 |
| Communist Party of the Peoples of Spain (PCPE) | 817 | 0.07 | −0.06 |
| Humanist Party (PH) | 702 | 0.06 | +0.01 |
| Natural Law Party (PLN) | 529 | 0.05 | New |
| Centrist Union–Democratic and Social Centre (UC–CDS) | 487 | 0.04 | −0.39 |
| United Extremadura (EU) | 458 | 0.04 | −0.02 |
| Andecha Astur (AA) | 359 | 0.03 | New |
| Alliance for National Unity (AUN) | 339 | 0.03 | New |
| Convergence and Union (CiU) | 325 | 0.03 | ±0.00 |
| Independent Spanish Phalanx (FEI) | 264 | 0.02 | ±0.00 |
| Party of Self-employed of Spain and Spanish Independent Groups (PAE–I) | 262 | 0.03 | New |
| Leonese People's Union (UPL) | 259 | 0.02 | New |
| Coalition for the Repeal of the Maastricht Treaty (DM)^{3} | 248 | 0.02 | −0.01 |
| Commoners' Land–Castilian Nationalist Party (TC–PNC) | 239 | 0.02 | New |
| Regionalist Party of the Leonese Country (PREPAL) | 232 | 0.02 | −0.02 |
| Union of Regions (UDR) | 220 | 0.02 | New |
| European Coalition (CE) | 212 | 0.02 | New |
| Party for Independence (PI) | 209 | 0.02 | New |
| Spanish Democratic Party (PADE) | 200 | 0.02 | New |
| Extremaduran Coalition (PREx–CREx)^{4} | 193 | 0.02 | ±0.00 |
| National Democracy (DN) | 176 | 0.02 | New |
| Regionalist Unity of Castile and León (URCL) | 170 | 0.01 | −0.02 |
| Asturianist Party (PAS) | 165 | 0.01 | −0.03 |
| Asturian Renewal Union (URAS) | 162 | 0.01 | New |
| Independent Socialists of Extremadura (SIEx) | 153 | 0.01 | New |
| Valencian Community Alternative (ACV) | 148 | 0.01 | New |
| Andalusia Assembly (A) | 142 | 0.01 | New |
| The Phalanx (FE) | 133 | 0.01 | New |
| Blank ballots | 20,098 | 1.74 | −0.18 |
| Total | 1,157,595 | | |
| Valid votes | 1,157,595 | 99.12 | −0.18 |
| Invalid votes | 10,272 | 0.88 | +0.18 |
| Votes cast / turnout | 1,167,867 | 64.55 | +12.27 |
| Abstentions | 641,458 | 35.45 | −12.27 |
| Registered voters | 1,809,325 | | |
Sources
Footnotes: ^{1} Basque Nationalist Party–Basque Solidarity results are compared to the combined totals of Basque Nationalist Party and Basque Solidarity in the 1994 election.; ^{2} Basque Citizens results are compared to Popular Unity totals in the 1994 election.; ^{3} Coalition for the Repeal of the Maastricht Treaty results are compared to Coalition for a New Socialist Party totals in the 1994 election.; ^{4} Extremaduran Coalition results are compared to Extremaduran Regionalist Party totals in the 1994 election.

=== Canary Islands ===
← Summary of the 13 June 1999 European Parliament election results in the Canary Islands →
| Parties and alliances | Popular vote | | |
| Parties and alliances | Votes | % | ±pp |
|---|---|---|---|
| Canarian Coalition (European Coalition) (CC) | 276,186 | 33.78 | +14.93 |
| People's Party (PP) | 273,296 | 33.43 | −10.48 |
| Spanish Socialist Workers' Party–Progressives (PSOE–p) | 200,628 | 24.54 | −0.27 |
| Canarian United Left (IUC) | 23,634 | 2.89 | −5.44 |
| The Greens (The Greens–Left of the Peoples) (LV) | 8,285 | 1.01 | New |
| The Greens–Green Group (LV–GV) | 6,198 | 0.76 | +0.12 |
| Centrist Union–Democratic and Social Centre (UC–CDS) | 3,574 | 0.44 | −0.27 |
| Union of Regions (UDR) | 1,833 | 0.22 | New |
| Basque Citizens (EH)^{1} | 1,104 | 0.14 | +0.03 |
| Confederation of Feminist Organizations (COFEM/FEMEK) | 972 | 0.12 | New |
| Communist Party of the Peoples of Spain (PCPE) | 950 | 0.12 | −0.11 |
| Galician Nationalist Bloc (BNG) | 811 | 0.10 | +0.04 |
| Nationalist Coalition–Europe of the Peoples (CN–EP)^{2} | 809 | 0.10 | +0.06 |
| Humanist Party (PH) | 714 | 0.09 | +0.03 |
| Commoners' Land–Castilian Nationalist Party (TC–PNC) | 706 | 0.09 | New |
| Independent Spanish Phalanx (FEI) | 472 | 0.06 | +0.01 |
| Convergence and Union (CiU) | 369 | 0.05 | ±0.00 |
| Party for Independence (PI) | 357 | 0.04 | New |
| Natural Law Party (PLN) | 324 | 0.04 | New |
| Coalition for the Repeal of the Maastricht Treaty (DM)^{3} | 306 | 0.04 | −0.03 |
| Spanish Democratic Party (PADE) | 302 | 0.04 | New |
| Party of Self-employed of Spain and Spanish Independent Groups (PAE–I) | 301 | 0.04 | New |
| Alliance for National Unity (AUN) | 290 | 0.04 | New |
| Andalusia Assembly (A) | 269 | 0.03 | New |
| Asturianist Party (PAS) | 258 | 0.03 | −0.02 |
| United Extremadura (EU) | 232 | 0.03 | −0.05 |
| The Phalanx (FE) | 232 | 0.03 | New |
| Regionalist Party of the Leonese Country (PREPAL) | 231 | 0.03 | ±0.00 |
| Independent Socialists of Extremadura (SIEx) | 222 | 0.03 | New |
| National Democracy (DN) | 216 | 0.03 | New |
| Leonese People's Union (UPL) | 204 | 0.02 | New |
| Valencian Community Alternative (ACV) | 201 | 0.02 | New |
| Regionalist Unity of Castile and León (URCL) | 201 | 0.02 | −0.03 |
| Extremaduran Coalition (PREx–CREx)^{4} | 201 | 0.02 | −0.01 |
| Andecha Astur (AA) | 173 | 0.02 | New |
| Asturian Renewal Union (URAS) | 152 | 0.02 | New |
| Blank ballots | 12,379 | 1.51 | +0.68 |
| Total | 817,592 | | |
| Valid votes | 817,592 | 98.98 | −0.66 |
| Invalid votes | 8,420 | 1.02 | +0.66 |
| Votes cast / turnout | 826,012 | 60.13 | +10.26 |
| Abstentions | 547,585 | 39.87 | −10.26 |
| Registered voters | 1,373,597 | | |
Sources
Footnotes: ^{1} Basque Citizens results are compared to Popular Unity totals in the 1994 election.; ^{2} Nationalist Coalition–Europe of the Peoples results are compared to For the Europe of the Peoples totals in the 1994 election.; ^{3} Coalition for the Repeal of the Maastricht Treaty results are compared to Coalition for a New Socialist Party totals in the 1994 election.; ^{4} Extremaduran Coalition results are compared to Extremaduran Regionalist Party totals in the 1994 election.

=== Cantabria ===
← Summary of the 13 June 1999 European Parliament election results in Cantabria →
| Parties and alliances | Popular vote | | |
| Parties and alliances | Votes | % | ±pp |
|---|---|---|---|
| People's Party (PP) | 170,152 | 54.37 | +4.83 |
| Spanish Socialist Workers' Party–Progressives (PSOE–p) | 107,218 | 34.26 | +2.07 |
| United Left of Cantabria (IU) | 15,660 | 5.00 | −7.26 |
| The Greens–Green Group (LV–GV) | 1,746 | 0.56 | −0.12 |
| The Greens (The Greens–Left of the Peoples) (LV) | 1,352 | 0.43 | New |
| Centrist Union–Democratic and Social Centre (UC–CDS) | 960 | 0.31 | −1.26 |
| Basque Citizens (EH)^{1} | 708 | 0.23 | +0.05 |
| Communist Party of the Peoples of Spain (PCPE) | 577 | 0.18 | ±0.00 |
| Spanish Democratic Party (PADE) | 458 | 0.15 | New |
| Independent Spanish Phalanx (FEI) | 453 | 0.14 | +0.11 |
| Nationalist Coalition–Europe of the Peoples (CN–EP)^{2} | 410 | 0.13 | +0.05 |
| Confederation of Feminist Organizations (COFEM/FEMEK) | 326 | 0.10 | New |
| The Phalanx (FE) | 245 | 0.08 | New |
| Alliance for National Unity (AUN) | 194 | 0.06 | New |
| Humanist Party (PH) | 189 | 0.06 | +0.02 |
| Party of Self-employed of Spain and Spanish Independent Groups (PAE–I) | 180 | 0.06 | New |
| Regionalist Unity of Castile and León (URCL) | 173 | 0.06 | +0.02 |
| Natural Law Party (PLN) | 159 | 0.05 | New |
| Galician Nationalist Bloc (BNG) | 146 | 0.05 | +0.02 |
| Convergence and Union (CiU) | 132 | 0.04 | −0.01 |
| Commoners' Land–Castilian Nationalist Party (TC–PNC) | 118 | 0.04 | New |
| Coalition for the Repeal of the Maastricht Treaty (DM)^{3} | 114 | 0.04 | ±0.00 |
| National Democracy (DN) | 113 | 0.04 | New |
| Leonese People's Union (UPL) | 109 | 0.03 | New |
| Union of Regions (UDR) | 102 | 0.03 | New |
| Independent Socialists of Extremadura (SIEx) | 96 | 0.03 | New |
| United Extremadura (EU) | 94 | 0.03 | −0.01 |
| Andalusia Assembly (A) | 90 | 0.03 | New |
| European Coalition (CE) | 90 | 0.03 | New |
| Party for Independence (PI) | 90 | 0.03 | New |
| Asturian Renewal Union (URAS) | 88 | 0.03 | New |
| Asturianist Party (PAS) | 85 | 0.03 | +0.01 |
| Andecha Astur (AA) | 82 | 0.03 | New |
| Regionalist Party of the Leonese Country (PREPAL) | 69 | 0.02 | ±0.00 |
| Extremaduran Coalition (PREx–CREx)^{4} | 63 | 0.02 | ±0.00 |
| Valencian Community Alternative (ACV) | 53 | 0.02 | New |
| Blank ballots | 10,047 | 3.21 | +1.41 |
| Total | 312,941 | | |
| Valid votes | 312,941 | 99.04 | −0.43 |
| Invalid votes | 3,038 | 0.96 | +0.43 |
| Votes cast / turnout | 315,979 | 67.88 | +5.96 |
| Abstentions | 149,496 | 32.12 | −5.96 |
| Registered voters | 465,475 | | |
Sources
Footnotes: ^{1} Basque Citizens results are compared to Popular Unity totals in the 1994 election.; ^{2} Nationalist Coalition–Europe of the Peoples results are compared to Nationalist Coalition totals in the 1994 election.; ^{3} Coalition for the Repeal of the Maastricht Treaty results are compared to Coalition for a New Socialist Party totals in the 1994 election.; ^{4} Extremaduran Coalition results are compared to Extremaduran Regionalist Party totals in the 1994 election.

=== Castile and León ===
← Summary of the 13 June 1999 European Parliament election results in Castile and León →
| Parties and alliances | Popular vote | | |
| Parties and alliances | Votes | % | ±pp |
|---|---|---|---|
| People's Party (PP) | 768,504 | 52.83 | −0.90 |
| Spanish Socialist Workers' Party–Progressives (PSOE–p) | 491,327 | 33.78 | +4.94 |
| United Left of Castile and León (IUCL) | 73,080 | 5.02 | −5.96 |
| Leonese People's Union (UPL) | 28,671 | 1.97 | New |
| The Greens–Green Group (LV–GV) | 8,103 | 0.56 | −0.09 |
| Commoners' Land–Castilian Nationalist Party (TC–PNC) | 7,104 | 0.49 | +0.26 |
| The Greens (The Greens–Left of the Peoples) (LV) | 6,650 | 0.46 | New |
| Centrist Union–Democratic and Social Centre (UC–CDS) | 6,145 | 0.42 | −1.39 |
| Regionalist Unity of Castile and León (URCL) | 5,141 | 0.35 | +0.01 |
| Spanish Democratic Party (PADE) | 2,679 | 0.18 | New |
| Regionalist Party of the Leonese Country (PREPAL) | 2,292 | 0.16 | −0.01 |
| Communist Party of the Peoples of Spain (PCPE) | 1,636 | 0.11 | −0.04 |
| Basque Citizens (EH)^{1} | 1,630 | 0.11 | +0.02 |
| Confederation of Feminist Organizations (COFEM/FEMEK) | 1,578 | 0.11 | New |
| Galician Nationalist Bloc (BNG) | 1,425 | 0.10 | +0.06 |
| Independent Spanish Phalanx (FEI) | 1,247 | 0.09 | +0.06 |
| Alliance for National Unity (AUN) | 973 | 0.07 | New |
| The Phalanx (FE) | 950 | 0.07 | New |
| Party of Self-employed of Spain and Spanish Independent Groups (PAE–I) | 928 | 0.06 | New |
| Humanist Party (PH) | 858 | 0.06 | +0.02 |
| Nationalist Coalition–Europe of the Peoples (CN–EP)^{2} | 794 | 0.05 | +0.01 |
| Andecha Astur (AA) | 762 | 0.05 | New |
| National Democracy (DN) | 732 | 0.05 | New |
| Natural Law Party (PLN) | 680 | 0.05 | New |
| Party for Independence (PI) | 595 | 0.04 | New |
| Convergence and Union (CiU) | 555 | 0.04 | ±0.00 |
| Union of Regions (UDR) | 550 | 0.04 | New |
| Coalition for the Repeal of the Maastricht Treaty (DM)^{3} | 504 | 0.03 | −0.01 |
| United Extremadura (EU) | 481 | 0.03 | ±0.00 |
| Asturianist Party (PAS) | 480 | 0.03 | ±0.00 |
| Independent Socialists of Extremadura (SIEx) | 444 | 0.03 | New |
| European Coalition (CE) | 411 | 0.03 | New |
| Andalusia Assembly (A) | 358 | 0.02 | New |
| Valencian Community Alternative (ACV) | 351 | 0.02 | New |
| Asturian Renewal Union (URAS) | 330 | 0.02 | New |
| Extremaduran Coalition (PREx–CREx)^{4} | 312 | 0.02 | ±0.00 |
| Blank ballots | 35,356 | 2.43 | +0.83 |
| Total | 1,454,616 | | |
| Valid votes | 1,454,616 | 99.07 | −0.41 |
| Invalid votes | 13,629 | 0.93 | +0.41 |
| Votes cast / turnout | 1,468,245 | 67.06 | +5.08 |
| Abstentions | 721,148 | 32.94 | −5.08 |
| Registered voters | 2,189,393 | | |
Sources
Footnotes: ^{1} Basque Citizens results are compared to Popular Unity totals in the 1994 election.; ^{2} Nationalist Coalition–Europe of the Peoples results are compared to Nationalist Coalition totals in the 1994 election.; ^{3} Coalition for the Repeal of the Maastricht Treaty results are compared to Coalition for a New Socialist Party totals in the 1994 election.; ^{4} Extremaduran Coalition results are compared to Extremaduran Regionalist Party totals in the 1994 election.

=== Castilla–La Mancha ===
← Summary of the 13 June 1999 European Parliament election results in Castilla–La Mancha →
| Parties and alliances | Popular vote | | |
| Parties and alliances | Votes | % | ±pp |
|---|---|---|---|
| People's Party (PP) | 496,274 | 47.36 | −0.57 |
| Spanish Socialist Workers' Party–Progressives (PSOE–p) | 476,280 | 45.45 | +7.56 |
| United Left–Left of Castilla–La Mancha (IU–ICAM) | 42,651 | 4.07 | −6.40 |
| The Greens–Green Group (LV–GV) | 3,163 | 0.30 | −0.20 |
| The Greens (The Greens–Left of the Peoples) (LV) | 2,733 | 0.26 | New |
| Centrist Union–Democratic and Social Centre (UC–CDS) | 2,022 | 0.19 | −0.84 |
| Commoners' Land–Castilian Nationalist Party (TC–PNC) | 896 | 0.09 | +0.03 |
| Spanish Democratic Party (PADE) | 869 | 0.08 | New |
| Communist Party of the Peoples of Spain (PCPE) | 713 | 0.07 | −0.04 |
| Independent Spanish Phalanx (FEI) | 605 | 0.06 | +0.03 |
| The Phalanx (FE) | 595 | 0.06 | New |
| Confederation of Feminist Organizations (COFEM/FEMEK) | 553 | 0.05 | New |
| Humanist Party (PH) | 441 | 0.04 | +0.01 |
| Party of Self-employed of Spain and Spanish Independent Groups (PAE–I) | 398 | 0.04 | New |
| Basque Citizens (EH)^{1} | 386 | 0.04 | +0.01 |
| Union of Regions (UDR) | 358 | 0.03 | New |
| National Democracy (DN) | 355 | 0.03 | New |
| Alliance for National Unity (AUN) | 355 | 0.03 | New |
| United Extremadura (EU) | 254 | 0.02 | ±0.00 |
| Galician Nationalist Bloc (BNG) | 236 | 0.02 | ±0.00 |
| Convergence and Union (CiU) | 228 | 0.02 | −0.01 |
| Natural Law Party (PLN) | 225 | 0.02 | New |
| Regionalist Unity of Castile and León (URCL) | 187 | 0.02 | −0.01 |
| Coalition for the Repeal of the Maastricht Treaty (DM)^{2} | 182 | 0.02 | ±0.00 |
| European Coalition (CE) | 175 | 0.02 | New |
| Party for Independence (PI) | 155 | 0.01 | New |
| Nationalist Coalition–Europe of the Peoples (CN–EP)^{3} | 142 | 0.01 | −0.01 |
| Asturianist Party (PAS) | 130 | 0.01 | −0.01 |
| Leonese People's Union (UPL) | 129 | 0.01 | New |
| Andalusia Assembly (A) | 129 | 0.01 | New |
| Regionalist Party of the Leonese Country (PREPAL) | 127 | 0.01 | −0.01 |
| Independent Socialists of Extremadura (SIEx) | 127 | 0.01 | New |
| Valencian Community Alternative (ACV) | 114 | 0.01 | New |
| Andecha Astur (AA) | 100 | 0.01 | New |
| Extremaduran Coalition (PREx–CREx)^{4} | 94 | 0.01 | ±0.00 |
| Asturian Renewal Union (URAS) | 94 | 0.01 | New |
| Blank ballots | 15,385 | 1.47 | +0.44 |
| Total | 1,047,860 | | |
| Valid votes | 1,047,860 | 99.27 | −0.25 |
| Invalid votes | 7,739 | 0.73 | +0.25 |
| Votes cast / turnout | 1,055,599 | 74.64 | +9.18 |
| Abstentions | 358,599 | 25.36 | −9.18 |
| Registered voters | 1,414,198 | | |
Sources
Footnotes: ^{1} Basque Citizens results are compared to Popular Unity totals in the 1994 election.; ^{2} Coalition for the Repeal of the Maastricht Treaty results are compared to Coalition for a New Socialist Party totals in the 1994 election.; ^{3} Nationalist Coalition–Europe of the Peoples results are compared to Nationalist Coalition totals in the 1994 election.; ^{4} Extremaduran Coalition results are compared to Extremaduran Regionalist Party totals in the 1994 election.

=== Catalonia ===
← Summary of the 13 June 1999 European Parliament election results in Catalonia →
| Parties and alliances | Popular vote | | |
| Parties and alliances | Votes | % | ±pp |
|---|---|---|---|
| Socialists' Party of Catalonia (PSC–PSOE) | 997,311 | 34.64 | +6.47 |
| Convergence and Union (CiU) | 843,021 | 29.28 | −2.22 |
| People's Party (PP) | 486,471 | 16.90 | −1.60 |
| Republican Left of Catalonia–The Greens (CN–EP) (ERC–EV)^{1} | 174,374 | 6.06 | −0.45 |
| Initiative for Catalonia–Greens (Left of the Peoples) (IC–V) | 156,471 | 5.43 | −5.65 |
| United and Alternative Left (EUiA) | 58,977 | 2.05 | New |
| The Greens–Green Group (EV–GV) | 36,540 | 1.27 | +0.70 |
| Basque Citizens (EH)^{2} | 17,607 | 0.61 | +0.44 |
| Party for Independence (PI) | 11,754 | 0.41 | New |
| Communist Party of the Peoples of Spain (PCPE) | 6,316 | 0.22 | −0.04 |
| Centrist Union–Democratic and Social Centre (UC–CDS) | 4,386 | 0.15 | −0.53 |
| Confederation of Feminist Organizations (COFEM/FEMEK) | 4,380 | 0.15 | New |
| Galician Nationalist Bloc (BNG) | 3,530 | 0.12 | +0.05 |
| Independent Spanish Phalanx (FEI) | 1,916 | 0.07 | +0.04 |
| United Extremadura (EU) | 1,886 | 0.07 | +0.01 |
| Natural Law Party (PLN) | 1,868 | 0.06 | New |
| Humanist Party (PH) | 1,858 | 0.06 | +0.02 |
| The Phalanx (FE) | 1,745 | 0.06 | New |
| Alliance for National Unity (AUN) | 1,540 | 0.05 | New |
| National Democracy (DN) | 1,307 | 0.05 | New |
| Party of Self-employed of Spain and Spanish Independent Groups (PAE–I) | 1,290 | 0.04 | New |
| Andalusia Assembly (A) | 1,265 | 0.04 | New |
| Spanish Democratic Party (PADE) | 1,222 | 0.04 | New |
| Andecha Astur (AA) | 1,169 | 0.04 | New |
| European Coalition (CE) | 1,167 | 0.04 | New |
| Regionalist Party of the Leonese Country (PREPAL) | 1,112 | 0.04 | +0.01 |
| Leonese People's Union (UPL) | 1,064 | 0.04 | New |
| Regionalist Unity of Castile and León (URCL) | 1,008 | 0.04 | +0.01 |
| Coalition for the Repeal of the Maastricht Treaty (DM)^{3} | 1,004 | 0.03 | −0.01 |
| Independent Socialists of Extremadura (SIEx) | 958 | 0.03 | New |
| Extremaduran Coalition (PREx–CREx)^{4} | 896 | 0.03 | +0.01 |
| Union of Regions (UDR) | 859 | 0.03 | New |
| Commoners' Land–Castilian Nationalist Party (TC–PNC) | 839 | 0.03 | New |
| Asturianist Party (PAS) | 835 | 0.03 | ±0.00 |
| Valencian Community Alternative (ACV) | 756 | 0.03 | New |
| Asturian Renewal Union (URAS) | 686 | 0.02 | New |
| Blank ballots | 49,875 | 1.73 | +0.54 |
| Total | 2,879,263 | | |
| Valid votes | 2,879,263 | 99.33 | −0.26 |
| Invalid votes | 19,544 | 0.67 | +0.26 |
| Votes cast / turnout | 2,898,807 | 54.83 | +2.94 |
| Abstentions | 2,388,558 | 45.17 | −2.94 |
| Registered voters | 5,287,365 | | |
Sources
Footnotes: ^{1} Republican Left of Catalonia–The Greens results are compared to the combined totals of Republican Left of Catalonia–Catalan Action and The Greens–Ecologist Confederation of Catalonia in the 1994 election.; ^{2} Basque Citizens results are compared to Popular Unity totals in the 1994 election.; ^{3} Coalition for the Repeal of the Maastricht Treaty results are compared to Coalition for a New Socialist Party totals in the 1994 election.; ^{4} Extremaduran Coalition results are compared to Extremaduran Regionalist Party totals in the 1994 election.

=== Extremadura ===
← Summary of the 13 June 1999 European Parliament election results in Extremadura →
| Parties and alliances | Popular vote | | |
| Parties and alliances | Votes | % | ±pp |
|---|---|---|---|
| Spanish Socialist Workers' Party–Progressives (PSOE–p) | 299,768 | 46.51 | +1.49 |
| People's Party (PP) | 274,196 | 42.54 | +2.32 |
| United Left–Commitment for Extremadura (IU–CE) | 39,301 | 6.10 | −4.60 |
| United Extremadura (EU) | 7,275 | 1.13 | +0.14 |
| Independent Socialists of Extremadura (SIEx) | 5,131 | 0.80 | New |
| Extremaduran Coalition (PREx–CREx)^{1} | 3,017 | 0.47 | +0.24 |
| The Greens–Green Group (LV–GV) | 1,859 | 0.29 | −0.08 |
| The Greens (The Greens–Left of the Peoples) (LV) | 1,649 | 0.26 | New |
| Communist Party of the Peoples of Spain (PCPE) | 538 | 0.08 | −0.08 |
| Centrist Union–Democratic and Social Centre (UC–CDS) | 470 | 0.07 | −0.61 |
| Independent Spanish Phalanx (FEI) | 386 | 0.06 | +0.03 |
| Confederation of Feminist Organizations (COFEM/FEMEK) | 342 | 0.05 | New |
| The Phalanx (FE) | 252 | 0.04 | New |
| Basque Citizens (EH) | 208 | 0.03 | New |
| Humanist Party (PH) | 191 | 0.03 | +0.01 |
| Alliance for National Unity (AUN) | 189 | 0.03 | New |
| Spanish Democratic Party (PADE) | 172 | 0.03 | New |
| Natural Law Party (PLN) | 159 | 0.02 | New |
| Party of Self-employed of Spain and Spanish Independent Groups (PAE–I) | 158 | 0.02 | New |
| Convergence and Union (CiU) | 139 | 0.02 | −0.01 |
| Party for Independence (PI) | 135 | 0.02 | New |
| Galician Nationalist Bloc (BNG) | 127 | 0.02 | ±0.00 |
| Nationalist Coalition–Europe of the Peoples (CN–EP)^{2} | 126 | 0.02 | −0.03 |
| National Democracy (DN) | 122 | 0.02 | New |
| Coalition for the Repeal of the Maastricht Treaty (DM)^{3} | 112 | 0.02 | −0.02 |
| European Coalition (CE) | 109 | 0.02 | New |
| Regionalist Party of the Leonese Country (PREPAL) | 107 | 0.02 | +0.01 |
| Union of Regions (UDR) | 106 | 0.02 | New |
| Regionalist Unity of Castile and León (URCL) | 92 | 0.01 | −0.02 |
| Andecha Astur (AA) | 91 | 0.01 | New |
| Andalusia Assembly (A) | 89 | 0.01 | New |
| Asturianist Party (PAS) | 87 | 0.01 | −0.01 |
| Commoners' Land–Castilian Nationalist Party (TC–PNC) | 87 | 0.01 | New |
| Leonese People's Union (UPL) | 86 | 0.01 | New |
| Asturian Renewal Union (URAS) | 86 | 0.01 | New |
| Valencian Community Alternative (ACV) | 70 | 0.01 | New |
| Blank ballots | 7,490 | 1.16 | +0.38 |
| Total | 644,522 | | |
| Valid votes | 644,522 | 99.28 | −0.32 |
| Invalid votes | 4,666 | 0.72 | +0.32 |
| Votes cast / turnout | 649,188 | 74.19 | +8.00 |
| Abstentions | 225,852 | 25.81 | −8.00 |
| Registered voters | 875,040 | | |
Sources
Footnotes: ^{1} Extremaduran Coalition results are compared to Extremaduran Regionalist Party totals in the 1994 election.; ^{2} Nationalist Coalition–Europe of the Peoples results are compared to the combined totals of Nationalist Coalition and For the Europe of the Peoples in the 1994 election.; ^{3} Coalition for the Repeal of the Maastricht Treaty results are compared to Coalition for a New Socialist Party totals in the 1994 election.

=== Galicia ===
← Summary of the 13 June 1999 European Parliament election results in Galicia →
| Parties and alliances | Popular vote | | |
| Parties and alliances | Votes | % | ±pp |
|---|---|---|---|
| People's Party (PP) | 760,863 | 49.89 | −4.67 |
| Socialists' Party of Galicia–Progressives (PSdeG–PSOE–p) | 360,235 | 23.62 | −1.18 |
| Galician Nationalist Bloc (BNG) | 335,193 | 21.98 | +10.58 |
| United Left (EU–IU) | 17,333 | 1.14 | −3.93 |
| The Greens–Green Group (OV–GV) | 5,574 | 0.37 | +0.06 |
| Left of Galicia–The Greens (Left of the Peoples) (EG–OV) | 3,920 | 0.26 | New |
| Centrist Union–Democratic and Social Centre (UC–CDS) | 2,225 | 0.15 | −0.44 |
| Confederation of Feminist Organizations (COFEM/FEMEK) | 1,796 | 0.12 | New |
| Communist Party of the Peoples of Spain (PCPE) | 1,598 | 0.10 | −0.04 |
| Basque Citizens (EH)^{1} | 1,598 | 0.10 | ±0.00 |
| Spanish Democratic Party (PADE) | 1,059 | 0.07 | New |
| Humanist Party (PH) | 1,028 | 0.07 | +0.03 |
| Independent Spanish Phalanx (FEI) | 882 | 0.06 | +0.02 |
| Party for Independence (PI) | 681 | 0.04 | New |
| National Democracy (DN) | 667 | 0.04 | New |
| Party of Self-employed of Spain and Spanish Independent Groups (PAE–I) | 651 | 0.04 | New |
| Alliance for National Unity (AUN) | 631 | 0.04 | New |
| Convergence and Union (CiU) | 590 | 0.04 | ±0.00 |
| Asturian Renewal Union (URAS) | 575 | 0.04 | New |
| Andecha Astur (AA) | 575 | 0.04 | New |
| Natural Law Party (PLN) | 547 | 0.04 | New |
| Nationalist Coalition–Europe of the Peoples (CN–EP)^{2} | 528 | 0.03 | ±0.00 |
| European Coalition (CE) | 496 | 0.03 | New |
| The Phalanx (FE) | 463 | 0.03 | New |
| Commoners' Land–Castilian Nationalist Party (TC–PNC) | 439 | 0.03 | New |
| Independent Socialists of Extremadura (SIEx) | 431 | 0.03 | New |
| Regionalist Unity of Castile and León (URCL) | 425 | 0.03 | −0.01 |
| Coalition for the Repeal of the Maastricht Treaty (DM)^{3} | 424 | 0.03 | −0.03 |
| Regionalist Party of the Leonese Country (PREPAL) | 409 | 0.03 | +0.01 |
| Leonese People's Union (UPL) | 395 | 0.03 | New |
| Asturianist Party (PAS) | 390 | 0.03 | ±0.00 |
| United Extremadura (EU) | 368 | 0.02 | −0.02 |
| Union of Regions (UDR) | 363 | 0.02 | New |
| Valencian Community Alternative (ACV) | 361 | 0.02 | New |
| Andalusia Assembly (A) | 325 | 0.02 | New |
| Extremaduran Coalition (PREx–CREx)^{4} | 324 | 0.02 | ±0.00 |
| Blank ballots | 20,740 | 1.36 | +0.15 |
| Total | 1,525,102 | | |
| Valid votes | 1,525,102 | 99.07 | −0.43 |
| Invalid votes | 14,268 | 0.93 | +0.43 |
| Votes cast / turnout | 1,539,370 | 60.82 | +10.57 |
| Abstentions | 991,744 | 39.18 | −10.57 |
| Registered voters | 2,531,114 | | |
Sources
Footnotes: ^{1} Basque Citizens results are compared to Popular Unity totals in the 1994 election.; ^{2} Nationalist Coalition–Europe of the Peoples results are compared to For the Europe of the Peoples totals in the 1994 election.; ^{3} Coalition for the Repeal of the Maastricht Treaty results are compared to Coalition for a New Socialist Party totals in the 1994 election.; ^{4} Extremaduran Coalition results are compared to Extremaduran Regionalist Party totals in the 1994 election.

=== La Rioja ===
← Summary of the 13 June 1999 European Parliament election results in La Rioja →
| Parties and alliances | Popular vote | | |
| Parties and alliances | Votes | % | ±pp |
|---|---|---|---|
| People's Party (PP) | 83,196 | 53.55 | +0.43 |
| Spanish Socialist Workers' Party–Progressives (PSOE–p) | 57,192 | 36.81 | +6.68 |
| United Left–La Rioja (IU) | 6,172 | 3.97 | −6.87 |
| The Greens (The Greens–Left of the Peoples) (LV) | 1,343 | 0.86 | New |
| The Greens–Green Group (LV–GV) | 1,126 | 0.72 | +0.01 |
| Confederation of Feminist Organizations (COFEM/FEMEK) | 369 | 0.24 | New |
| Basque Citizens (EH)^{1} | 364 | 0.23 | +0.04 |
| Centrist Union–Democratic and Social Centre (UC–CDS) | 271 | 0.17 | −1.23 |
| Nationalist Coalition–Europe of the Peoples (CN–EP)^{2} | 202 | 0.13 | +0.01 |
| Communist Party of the Peoples of Spain (PCPE) | 149 | 0.10 | −0.01 |
| Party of Self-employed of Spain and Spanish Independent Groups (PAE–I) | 95 | 0.06 | New |
| Alliance for National Unity (AUN) | 89 | 0.06 | New |
| Independent Spanish Phalanx (FEI) | 84 | 0.05 | +0.01 |
| Natural Law Party (PLN) | 71 | 0.05 | New |
| Humanist Party (PH) | 70 | 0.05 | +0.01 |
| Spanish Democratic Party (PADE) | 67 | 0.04 | New |
| Galician Nationalist Bloc (BNG) | 67 | 0.04 | +0.02 |
| Convergence and Union (CiU) | 67 | 0.04 | ±0.00 |
| National Democracy (DN) | 64 | 0.04 | New |
| The Phalanx (FE) | 56 | 0.04 | New |
| Regionalist Unity of Castile and León (URCL) | 47 | 0.03 | −0.01 |
| Union of Regions (UDR) | 47 | 0.03 | New |
| European Coalition (CE) | 45 | 0.03 | New |
| Commoners' Land–Castilian Nationalist Party (TC–PNC) | 44 | 0.03 | ±0.00 |
| United Extremadura (EU) | 44 | 0.03 | +0.01 |
| Regionalist Party of the Leonese Country (PREPAL) | 42 | 0.03 | +0.01 |
| Party for Independence (PI) | 38 | 0.02 | New |
| Valencian Community Alternative (ACV) | 36 | 0.02 | New |
| Coalition for the Repeal of the Maastricht Treaty (DM)^{3} | 35 | 0.02 | −0.02 |
| Independent Socialists of Extremadura (SIEx) | 35 | 0.02 | New |
| Extremaduran Coalition (PREx–CREx)^{4} | 33 | 0.02 | ±0.00 |
| Andalusia Assembly (A) | 32 | 0.02 | New |
| Asturianist Party (PAS) | 31 | 0.02 | ±0.00 |
| Andecha Astur (AA) | 23 | 0.01 | New |
| Asturian Renewal Union (URAS) | 21 | 0.01 | New |
| Leonese People's Union (UPL) | 20 | 0.01 | New |
| Blank ballots | 3,679 | 2.37 | +0.56 |
| Total | 155,366 | | |
| Valid votes | 155,366 | 99.16 | −0.42 |
| Invalid votes | 1,317 | 0.84 | +0.42 |
| Votes cast / turnout | 156,683 | 68.05 | +7.25 |
| Abstentions | 73,548 | 31.95 | −7.25 |
| Registered voters | 230,231 | | |
Sources
Footnotes: ^{1} Basque Citizens results are compared to Popular Unity totals in the 1994 election.; ^{2} Nationalist Coalition–Europe of the Peoples results are compared to Nationalist Coalition totals in the 1994 election.; ^{3} Coalition for the Repeal of the Maastricht Treaty results are compared to Coalition for a New Socialist Party totals in the 1994 election.; ^{4} Extremaduran Coalition results are compared to Extremaduran Regionalist Party totals in the 1994 election.

=== Madrid ===
← Summary of the 13 June 1999 European Parliament election results in Madrid →
| Parties and alliances | Popular vote | | |
| Parties and alliances | Votes | % | ±pp |
|---|---|---|---|
| People's Party (PP) | 1,278,583 | 49.34 | −0.93 |
| Spanish Socialist Workers' Party–Progressives (PSOE–p) | 954,721 | 36.84 | +12.84 |
| United Left of the Community of Madrid (IUCM) | 208,377 | 8.04 | −11.51 |
| The Greens (The Greens–Left of the Peoples) (LV) | 22,723 | 0.88 | New |
| The Greens–Green Group (LV–GV) | 21,141 | 0.82 | −0.12 |
| Centrist Union–Democratic and Social Centre (UC–CDS) | 7,861 | 0.30 | −1.72 |
| Alliance for National Unity (AUN) | 4,310 | 0.17 | New |
| Confederation of Feminist Organizations (COFEM/FEMEK) | 4,199 | 0.16 | New |
| Basque Citizens (EH)^{1} | 3,569 | 0.14 | +0.06 |
| Galician Nationalist Bloc (BNG) | 3,274 | 0.13 | +0.08 |
| Communist Party of the Peoples of Spain (PCPE) | 3,102 | 0.12 | +0.04 |
| Independent Spanish Phalanx (FEI) | 2,610 | 0.10 | +0.07 |
| Humanist Party (PH) | 2,596 | 0.10 | +0.05 |
| United Extremadura (EU) | 2,544 | 0.10 | +0.03 |
| Spanish Democratic Party (PADE) | 2,404 | 0.09 | New |
| The Phalanx (FE) | 2,028 | 0.08 | New |
| Nationalist Coalition–Europe of the Peoples (CN–EP)^{2} | 1,506 | 0.06 | −0.04 |
| Party of Self-employed of Spain and Spanish Independent Groups (PAE–I) | 1,398 | 0.05 | New |
| Commoners' Land–Castilian Nationalist Party (TC–PNC) | 1,291 | 0.05 | +0.02 |
| Natural Law Party (PLN) | 1,288 | 0.05 | New |
| Convergence and Union (CiU) | 1,261 | 0.05 | −0.01 |
| Leonese People's Union (UPL) | 930 | 0.04 | New |
| Regionalist Unity of Castile and León (URCL) | 926 | 0.04 | +0.01 |
| National Democracy (DN) | 846 | 0.03 | New |
| European Coalition (CE) | 814 | 0.03 | New |
| Andecha Astur (AA) | 808 | 0.03 | New |
| Andalusia Assembly (A) | 790 | 0.03 | New |
| Regionalist Party of the Leonese Country (PREPAL) | 780 | 0.03 | +0.01 |
| Coalition for the Repeal of the Maastricht Treaty (DM)^{3} | 722 | 0.03 | ±0.00 |
| Extremaduran Coalition (PREx–CREx)^{4} | 694 | 0.03 | +0.01 |
| Asturianist Party (PAS) | 564 | 0.02 | −0.01 |
| Union of Regions (UDR) | 542 | 0.02 | New |
| Independent Socialists of Extremadura (SIEx) | 537 | 0.02 | New |
| Party for Independence (PI) | 465 | 0.02 | New |
| Asturian Renewal Union (URAS) | 427 | 0.02 | New |
| Valencian Community Alternative (ACV) | 425 | 0.02 | New |
| Blank ballots | 50,367 | 1.94 | +0.65 |
| Total | 2,591,423 | | |
| Valid votes | 2,591,423 | 99.47 | −0.23 |
| Invalid votes | 13,895 | 0.53 | +0.23 |
| Votes cast / turnout | 2,605,318 | 60.77 | +1.35 |
| Abstentions | 1,682,179 | 39.23 | −1.35 |
| Registered voters | 4,287,497 | | |
Sources
Footnotes: ^{1} Basque Citizens results are compared to Popular Unity totals in the 1994 election.; ^{2} Nationalist Coalition–Europe of the Peoples results are compared to Nationalist Coalition totals in the 1994 election.; ^{3} Coalition for the Repeal of the Maastricht Treaty results are compared to Coalition for a New Socialist Party totals in the 1994 election.; ^{4} Extremaduran Coalition results are compared to Extremaduran Regionalist Party totals in the 1994 election.

=== Murcia ===
← Summary of the 13 June 1999 European Parliament election results in Murcia →
| Parties and alliances | Popular vote | | |
| Parties and alliances | Votes | % | ±pp |
|---|---|---|---|
| People's Party (PP) | 325,602 | 53.17 | +0.96 |
| Spanish Socialist Workers' Party–Progressives (PSOE–p) | 222,743 | 36.37 | +5.40 |
| United Left of the Region of Murcia (IURM) | 40,441 | 6.60 | −6.48 |
| Spanish Democratic Party (PADE) | 3,588 | 0.59 | New |
| The Greens–Green Group (LV–GV) | 2,867 | 0.47 | −0.08 |
| The Greens (The Greens–Left of the Peoples) (LV) | 2,680 | 0.44 | New |
| Centrist Union–Democratic and Social Centre (UC–CDS) | 1,178 | 0.19 | −0.97 |
| Confederation of Feminist Organizations (COFEM/FEMEK) | 611 | 0.10 | New |
| Convergence and Union (CiU) | 446 | 0.07 | ±0.00 |
| Communist Party of the Peoples of Spain (PCPE) | 435 | 0.07 | −0.06 |
| Independent Spanish Phalanx (FEI) | 307 | 0.05 | +0.02 |
| Basque Citizens (EH)^{1} | 289 | 0.05 | +0.01 |
| The Phalanx (FE) | 287 | 0.05 | New |
| Alliance for National Unity (AUN) | 268 | 0.04 | New |
| Natural Law Party (PLN) | 193 | 0.03 | New |
| Party for Independence (PI) | 189 | 0.03 | New |
| Party of Self-employed of Spain and Spanish Independent Groups (PAE–I) | 183 | 0.03 | New |
| Nationalist Coalition–Europe of the Peoples (CN–EP)^{2} | 178 | 0.03 | −0.01 |
| Humanist Party (PH) | 158 | 0.03 | ±0.00 |
| Galician Nationalist Bloc (BNG) | 151 | 0.02 | ±0.00 |
| Union of Regions (UDR) | 145 | 0.02 | New |
| National Democracy (DN) | 143 | 0.02 | New |
| Coalition for the Repeal of the Maastricht Treaty (DM)^{3} | 133 | 0.02 | −0.01 |
| European Coalition (CE) | 130 | 0.02 | New |
| Andalusia Assembly (A) | 115 | 0.02 | New |
| United Extremadura (EU) | 110 | 0.02 | +0.01 |
| Regionalist Unity of Castile and León (URCL) | 106 | 0.02 | −0.01 |
| Commoners' Land–Castilian Nationalist Party (TC–PNC) | 105 | 0.02 | New |
| Asturianist Party (PAS) | 103 | 0.02 | ±0.00 |
| Asturian Renewal Union (URAS) | 98 | 0.02 | New |
| Independent Socialists of Extremadura (SIEx) | 93 | 0.02 | New |
| Leonese People's Union (UPL) | 92 | 0.02 | New |
| Extremaduran Coalition (PREx–CREx)^{4} | 89 | 0.01 | ±0.00 |
| Valencian Community Alternative (ACV) | 86 | 0.01 | New |
| Regionalist Party of the Leonese Country (PREPAL) | 86 | 0.01 | ±0.00 |
| Andecha Astur (AA) | 81 | 0.01 | New |
| Blank ballots | 7,906 | 1.29 | +0.52 |
| Total | 612,415 | | |
| Valid votes | 612,415 | 99.37 | −0.28 |
| Invalid votes | 3,911 | 0.63 | +0.28 |
| Votes cast / turnout | 616,326 | 67.58 | +1.03 |
| Abstentions | 295,649 | 32.42 | −1.03 |
| Registered voters | 911,975 | | |
Sources
Footnotes: ^{1} Basque Citizens results are compared to Popular Unity totals in the 1994 election.; ^{2} Nationalist Coalition–Europe of the Peoples results are compared to the combined totals of Nationalist Coalition and For the Europe of the Peoples in the 1994 election.; ^{3} Coalition for the Repeal of the Maastricht Treaty results are compared to Coalition for a New Socialist Party totals in the 1994 election.; ^{4} Extremaduran Coalition results are compared to Extremaduran Regionalist Party totals in the 1994 election.

=== Navarre ===
← Summary of the 13 June 1999 European Parliament election results in Navarre →
| Parties and alliances | Popular vote | | |
| Parties and alliances | Votes | % | ±pp |
|---|---|---|---|
| People's Party (PP) | 125,688 | 42.09 | +1.26 |
| Spanish Socialist Workers' Party–Progressives (PSOE–p) | 74,004 | 24.78 | −0.02 |
| Basque Citizens (EH)^{1} | 45,146 | 15.12 | +4.69 |
| Basque Solidarity–Basque Nationalist Party (CN–EP) (EA–PNV)^{2} | 17,030 | 5.70 | +0.73 |
| United Left of Navarre (IUN/NEB) | 16,132 | 5.40 | −7.37 |
| The Greens–Green Group (LV–GV) | 2,667 | 0.89 | +0.02 |
| The Greens (The Greens–Left of the Peoples) (LV) | 2,200 | 0.74 | New |
| Confederation of Feminist Organizations (COFEM/FEMEK) | 1,781 | 0.60 | New |
| Centrist Union–Democratic and Social Centre (UC–CDS) | 956 | 0.32 | −0.55 |
| Convergence and Union (CiU) | 487 | 0.16 | +0.10 |
| Communist Party of the Peoples of Spain (PCPE) | 345 | 0.12 | −0.01 |
| Humanist Party (PH) | 280 | 0.09 | +0.05 |
| Alliance for National Unity (AUN) | 276 | 0.09 | New |
| National Democracy (DN) | 241 | 0.08 | New |
| Galician Nationalist Bloc (BNG) | 225 | 0.08 | +0.05 |
| Natural Law Party (PLN) | 201 | 0.07 | New |
| Party of Self-employed of Spain and Spanish Independent Groups (PAE–I) | 151 | 0.05 | New |
| Spanish Democratic Party (PADE) | 139 | 0.05 | New |
| Andecha Astur (AA) | 133 | 0.04 | New |
| Party for Independence (PI) | 117 | 0.04 | New |
| European Coalition (CE) | 111 | 0.04 | New |
| Leonese People's Union (UPL) | 110 | 0.04 | New |
| Independent Spanish Phalanx (FEI) | 106 | 0.04 | +0.03 |
| Coalition for the Repeal of the Maastricht Treaty (DM)^{3} | 103 | 0.03 | ±0.00 |
| United Extremadura (EU) | 100 | 0.03 | −0.01 |
| Commoners' Land–Castilian Nationalist Party (TC–PNC) | 93 | 0.03 | New |
| Independent Socialists of Extremadura (SIEx) | 90 | 0.03 | New |
| Regionalist Party of the Leonese Country (PREPAL) | 79 | 0.03 | +0.02 |
| The Phalanx (FE) | 72 | 0.02 | New |
| Extremaduran Coalition (PREx–CREx)^{4} | 72 | 0.02 | ±0.00 |
| Regionalist Unity of Castile and León (URCL) | 70 | 0.02 | ±0.00 |
| Valencian Community Alternative (ACV) | 66 | 0.02 | New |
| Union of Regions (UDR) | 66 | 0.02 | New |
| Asturian Renewal Union (URAS) | 59 | 0.02 | New |
| Andalusia Assembly (A) | 52 | 0.02 | New |
| Asturianist Party (PAS) | 44 | 0.01 | −0.02 |
| Blank ballots | 9,130 | 3.06 | +1.29 |
| Total | 298,622 | | |
| Valid votes | 298,622 | 99.08 | −0.34 |
| Invalid votes | 2,761 | 0.92 | +0.34 |
| Votes cast / turnout | 301,383 | 65.21 | +11.60 |
| Abstentions | 160,788 | 34.79 | −11.60 |
| Registered voters | 462,171 | | |
Sources
Footnotes: ^{1} Basque Citizens results are compared to Popular Unity totals in the 1994 election.; ^{2} Basque Solidarity–Basque Nationalist Party results are compared to the combined totals of Basque Solidarity and Basque Nationalist Party in the 1994 election.; ^{3} Coalition for the Repeal of the Maastricht Treaty results are compared to Coalition for a New Socialist Party totals in the 1994 election.; ^{4} Extremaduran Coalition results are compared to Extremaduran Regionalist Party totals in the 1994 election.

=== Valencian Community ===
← Summary of the 13 June 1999 European Parliament election results in the Valencian Community →
| Parties and alliances | Popular vote | | |
| Parties and alliances | Votes | % | ±pp |
|---|---|---|---|
| People's Party (PP) | 1,080,472 | 47.66 | +3.47 |
| Spanish Socialist Workers' Party–Progressives (PSOE–p) | 807,299 | 35.61 | +5.12 |
| United Left of the Valencian Country (EUPV) | 130,788 | 5.77 | −8.15 |
| Valencian Union (European Coalition) (UV) | 89,785 | 3.96 | −1.32 |
| Valencian Nationalist Bloc (Convergence and Union) (BNV)^{1} | 54,589 | 2.41 | +0.62 |
| The Greens (The Greens–Left of the Peoples) (EV) | 17,611 | 0.78 | New |
| The Greens–Green Group (LV–GV) | 17,118 | 0.76 | +0.09 |
| Valencian Community Alternative (ACV) | 4,588 | 0.20 | New |
| Basque Citizens (EH)^{2} | 3,850 | 0.17 | +0.09 |
| Republican Left of Catalonia–The Greens (CN–EP) (ERC–EV) | 3,057 | 0.13 | +0.01 |
| Communist Party of the Peoples of Spain (PCPE) | 2,739 | 0.12 | −0.05 |
| Centrist Union–Democratic and Social Centre (UC–CDS) | 2,593 | 0.11 | −0.82 |
| Confederation of Feminist Organizations (COFEM/FEMEK) | 2,565 | 0.11 | New |
| Independent Spanish Phalanx (FEI) | 1,477 | 0.07 | +0.04 |
| The Phalanx (FE) | 1,353 | 0.06 | New |
| Spanish Democratic Party (PADE) | 1,154 | 0.05 | New |
| Humanist Party (PH) | 1,034 | 0.05 | +0.02 |
| Party for Independence (PI) | 937 | 0.04 | New |
| Alliance for National Unity (AUN) | 886 | 0.04 | New |
| National Democracy (DN) | 869 | 0.04 | New |
| Natural Law Party (PLN) | 801 | 0.04 | New |
| Galician Nationalist Bloc (BNG) | 730 | 0.03 | +0.01 |
| Party of Self-employed of Spain and Spanish Independent Groups (PAE–I) | 685 | 0.03 | New |
| Coalition for the Repeal of the Maastricht Treaty (DM)^{3} | 570 | 0.03 | ±0.00 |
| United Extremadura (EU) | 562 | 0.02 | −0.02 |
| Commoners' Land–Castilian Nationalist Party (TC–PNC) | 471 | 0.02 | New |
| Regionalist Unity of Castile and León (URCL) | 466 | 0.02 | −0.01 |
| Regionalist Party of the Leonese Country (PREPAL) | 436 | 0.02 | +0.01 |
| Leonese People's Union (UPL) | 421 | 0.02 | New |
| Andalusia Assembly (A) | 415 | 0.02 | New |
| Extremaduran Coalition (PREx–CREx)^{4} | 408 | 0.02 | ±0.00 |
| Asturianist Party (PAS) | 367 | 0.02 | ±0.00 |
| Union of Regions (UDR) | 361 | 0.02 | New |
| Andecha Astur (AA) | 358 | 0.02 | New |
| Independent Socialists of Extremadura (SIEx) | 357 | 0.02 | New |
| Asturian Renewal Union (URAS) | 299 | 0.01 | New |
| Blank ballots | 34,653 | 1.53 | +0.63 |
| Total | 2,267,124 | | |
| Valid votes | 2,267,124 | 99.22 | −0.41 |
| Invalid votes | 17,858 | 0.78 | +0.41 |
| Votes cast / turnout | 2,284,982 | 67.96 | +2.98 |
| Abstentions | 1,077,244 | 32.04 | −2.98 |
| Registered voters | 3,362,226 | | |
Sources
Footnotes: ^{1} Valencian Nationalist Bloc results are compared to Valencian People's Union totals in the 1994 election.; ^{2} Basque Citizens results are compared to Popular Unity totals in the 1994 election.; ^{3} Coalition for the Repeal of the Maastricht Treaty results are compared to Coalition for a New Socialist Party totals in the 1994 election.; ^{4} Extremaduran Coalition results are compared to Extremaduran Regionalist Party totals in the 1994 election.

== Autonomous cities ==
=== Ceuta ===
← Summary of the 13 June 1999 European Parliament election results in Ceuta →
| Parties and alliances | Popular vote | | |
| Parties and alliances | Votes | % | ±pp |
|---|---|---|---|
| People's Party (PP) | 18,727 | 60.81 | +0.54 |
| Spanish Socialist Workers' Party–Progressives (PSOE–p) | 8,765 | 28.46 | −2.35 |
| United Left–Ceuta (IU) | 1,144 | 3.71 | −0.56 |
| The Greens–Green Group (LV–GV) | 255 | 0.83 | +0.20 |
| The Greens (The Greens–Left of the Peoples) (LV) | 207 | 0.67 | New |
| Confederation of Feminist Organizations (COFEM/FEMEK) | 190 | 0.62 | New |
| Centrist Union–Democratic and Social Centre (UC–CDS) | 75 | 0.24 | −0.48 |
| Independent Spanish Phalanx (FEI) | 74 | 0.24 | +0.18 |
| Andalusia Assembly (A) | 67 | 0.22 | New |
| Alliance for National Unity (AUN) | 55 | 0.18 | New |
| European Coalition (CE) | 45 | 0.15 | New |
| Communist Party of the Peoples of Spain (PCPE) | 42 | 0.14 | +0.04 |
| The Phalanx (FE) | 41 | 0.13 | New |
| Humanist Party (PH) | 41 | 0.13 | +0.07 |
| Galician Nationalist Bloc (BNG) | 35 | 0.11 | +0.08 |
| Asturian Renewal Union (URAS) | 33 | 0.11 | New |
| Party for Independence (PI) | 33 | 0.11 | New |
| Natural Law Party (PLN) | 29 | 0.09 | New |
| Spanish Democratic Party (PADE) | 28 | 0.09 | New |
| United Extremadura (EU) | 28 | 0.09 | +0.07 |
| Party of Self-employed of Spain and Spanish Independent Groups (PAE–I) | 27 | 0.09 | New |
| Convergence and Union (CiU) | 26 | 0.08 | ±0.00 |
| Nationalist Coalition–Europe of the Peoples (CN–EP)^{1} | 23 | 0.07 | +0.03 |
| Basque Citizens (EH) | 22 | 0.07 | New |
| Regionalist Unity of Castile and León (URCL) | 21 | 0.07 | +0.05 |
| National Democracy (DN) | 20 | 0.06 | New |
| Commoners' Land–Castilian Nationalist Party (TC–PNC) | 19 | 0.06 | New |
| Coalition for the Repeal of the Maastricht Treaty (DM)^{2} | 17 | 0.06 | −0.03 |
| Extremaduran Coalition (PREx–CREx)^{3} | 15 | 0.05 | ±0.00 |
| Leonese People's Union (UPL) | 14 | 0.05 | New |
| Asturianist Party (PAS) | 14 | 0.05 | ±0.00 |
| Valencian Community Alternative (ACV) | 13 | 0.04 | New |
| Union of Regions (UDR) | 12 | 0.04 | New |
| Regionalist Party of the Leonese Country (PREPAL) | 10 | 0.03 | −0.03 |
| Andecha Astur (AA) | 9 | 0.03 | New |
| Independent Socialists of Extremadura (SIEx) | 8 | 0.03 | New |
| Blank ballots | 611 | 1.98 | +0.72 |
| Total | 30,795 | | |
| Valid votes | 30,795 | 98.48 | −0.40 |
| Invalid votes | 474 | 1.52 | +0.40 |
| Votes cast / turnout | 31,269 | 57.26 | +16.82 |
| Abstentions | 23,340 | 42.74 | −16.82 |
| Registered voters | 54,609 | | |
Sources
Footnotes: ^{1} Nationalist Coalition–Europe of the Peoples results are compared to the combined totals of Nationalist Coalition and For the Europe of the Peoples in the 1994 election.; ^{2} Coalition for the Repeal of the Maastricht Treaty results are compared to Coalition for a New Socialist Party totals in the 1994 election.; ^{3} Extremaduran Coalition results are compared to Extremaduran Regionalist Party totals in the 1994 election.

=== Melilla ===
← Summary of the 13 June 1999 European Parliament election results in Melilla →
| Parties and alliances | Popular vote | | |
| Parties and alliances | Votes | % | ±pp |
|---|---|---|---|
| People's Party (PP) | 12,095 | 50.12 | +1.10 |
| Spanish Socialist Workers' Party–Progressives (PSOE–p) | 9,054 | 37.52 | −3.92 |
| United Left of Melilla (IU) | 1,086 | 4.50 | −0.33 |
| The Greens–Green Group (LV–GV) | 243 | 1.01 | +0.49 |
| The Greens (The Greens–Left of the Peoples) (LV) | 132 | 0.55 | New |
| Centrist Union–Democratic and Social Centre (UC–CDS) | 65 | 0.27 | −0.72 |
| Andalusia Assembly (A) | 64 | 0.27 | New |
| European Coalition (CE) | 63 | 0.26 | New |
| Convergence and Union (CiU) | 60 | 0.25 | +0.21 |
| Independent Spanish Phalanx (FEI) | 54 | 0.22 | +0.16 |
| The Phalanx (FE) | 48 | 0.20 | New |
| Communist Party of the Peoples of Spain (PCPE) | 41 | 0.17 | +0.06 |
| Alliance for National Unity (AUN) | 40 | 0.17 | New |
| Confederation of Feminist Organizations (COFEM/FEMEK) | 36 | 0.15 | New |
| Galician Nationalist Bloc (BNG) | 33 | 0.14 | +0.06 |
| Spanish Democratic Party (PADE) | 32 | 0.13 | New |
| Party for Independence (PI) | 29 | 0.12 | New |
| Humanist Party (PH) | 29 | 0.12 | +0.04 |
| Asturianist Party (PAS) | 27 | 0.11 | +0.06 |
| Nationalist Coalition–Europe of the Peoples (CN–EP)^{1} | 27 | 0.11 | +0.04 |
| Party of Self-employed of Spain and Spanish Independent Groups (PAE–I) | 26 | 0.11 | New |
| Coalition for the Repeal of the Maastricht Treaty (DM)^{2} | 26 | 0.11 | +0.07 |
| Extremaduran Coalition (PREx–CREx)^{3} | 23 | 0.10 | +0.07 |
| Leonese People's Union (UPL) | 22 | 0.09 | New |
| Regionalist Party of the Leonese Country (PREPAL) | 21 | 0.09 | +0.05 |
| United Extremadura (EU) | 17 | 0.07 | −0.02 |
| Natural Law Party (PLN) | 16 | 0.07 | New |
| Union of Regions (UDR) | 15 | 0.06 | New |
| Asturian Renewal Union (URAS) | 15 | 0.06 | New |
| National Democracy (DN) | 14 | 0.06 | New |
| Regionalist Unity of Castile and León (URCL) | 14 | 0.06 | +0.03 |
| Basque Citizens (EH) | 13 | 0.05 | New |
| Valencian Community Alternative (ACV) | 12 | 0.05 | New |
| Independent Socialists of Extremadura (SIEx) | 11 | 0.05 | New |
| Commoners' Land–Castilian Nationalist Party (TC–PNC) | 10 | 0.04 | New |
| Andecha Astur (AA) | 9 | 0.04 | New |
| Blank ballots | 612 | 2.54 | +1.26 |
| Total | 24,134 | | |
| Valid votes | 24,134 | 99.06 | −0.56 |
| Invalid votes | 229 | 0.94 | +0.56 |
| Votes cast / turnout | 24,363 | 51.40 | +6.28 |
| Abstentions | 23,034 | 48.60 | −6.28 |
| Registered voters | 47,397 | | |
Sources
Footnotes: ^{1} Nationalist Coalition–Europe of the Peoples results are compared to the combined totals of Nationalist Coalition and For the Europe of the Peoples in the 1994 election.; ^{2} Coalition for the Repeal of the Maastricht Treaty results are compared to Coalition for a New Socialist Party totals in the 1994 election.; ^{3} Extremaduran Coalition results are compared to Extremaduran Regionalist Party totals in the 1994 election.

== Congress of Deputies projection ==
A projection of European Parliament election results using electoral rules for the Congress of Deputies would have given the following seat allocation, as distributed per constituencies and regions: (Note: Note that results are compared with party totals in the preceding general election—held in March 1996—for consistency.)

Summary of the 13 June 1999 Congress of Deputies projected election results
| Parties and alliances | Popular vote | | | Seats | |
| Parties and alliances | Votes | % | ±pp | Total | +/− |
|---|---|---|---|---|---|
| People's Party (PP) | 8,410,993 | 39.74 | +0.95 | 162 | +6 |
| Spanish Socialist Workers' Party–Progressives (PSOE–p) | 7,477,823 | 35.33 | −2.30 | 135 | −6 |
| United Left–United and Alternative Left (IU–EUiA)^{1} | 1,221,566 | 5.77 | −3.58 | 9 | −10 |
| Convergence and Union (CiU) | 843,021 | 3.98 | −0.62 | 17 | +1 |
| Basque Nationalist Party–Basque Solidarity (PNV–EA)^{2} | 409,830 | 1.94 | +0.21 | 7 | +1 |
| Galician Nationalist Bloc (BNG) | 335,193 | 1.58 | +0.70 | 5 | +3 |
| Canarian Coalition (CC) | 276,186 | 1.30 | +0.42 | 5 | +1 |
| Basque Citizens (EH)^{3} | 270,942 | 1.28 | +0.56 | 4 | +2 |
| Andalusian Party (PA) | 246,847 | 1.17 | +0.63 | 2 | +2 |
| Republican Left of Catalonia–The Greens (ERC–EV) | 177,431 | 0.84 | +0.17 | 1 | ±0 |
| Initiative for Catalonia–Greens (IC–V)^{4} | 156,471 | 0.74 | −0.45 | 2 | ±0 |
| Valencian Union (UV) | 89,785 | 0.42 | +0.05 | 1 | ±0 |
| Others | 892,593 | 4.22 | — | 0 | ±0 |
| Blank ballots | 357,583 | 1.69 | +0.72 | | |
| Total | 21,166,264 | | | 350 | ±0 |
Sources
Footnotes: ^{1} United Left–United and Alternative Left does not include Initiative for Catalonia results in Catalonia.; ^{2} Basque Nationalist Party–Basque Solidarity results are compared to the combined totals of the Basque Nationalist Party and Basque Solidarity in the 1996 election.; ^{3} Basque Citizens results are compared to Popular Unity totals in the 1996 election.; ^{4} Initiative for Catalonia–Greens results are compared to Initiative for Catalonia totals in the 1996 election, only in Catalonia.

=== Constituencies ===

Summary of constituency results in the 13 June 1999 European Parliament election in Spain
| Constituency | PP | | PSOE–p | | IU–EUiA | | CiU | | PNV–EA | | BNG | | CC | | EH | | PA | | ERC–EV | | IC–V | | UV | |
| Constituency | % | S | % | S | % | S | % | S | % | S | % | S | % | S | % | S | % | S | % | S | % | S | % | S |
|---|---|---|---|---|---|---|---|---|---|---|---|---|---|---|---|---|---|---|---|---|---|---|---|---|
| A Coruña | 46.5 | 5 | 25.3 | 2 | 1.3 | − | | | | | 23.2 | 2 | | | | | | | | | | | | |
| Álava | 31.6 | 2 | 20.4 | 1 | 4.2 | − | | | 26.4 | 1 | | | | | 13.5 | − | | | | | | | | |
| Albacete | 44.4 | 2 | 47.5 | 2 | 4.7 | − | | | | | | | | | | | | | | | | | | |
| Alicante | 48.8 | 6 | 37.4 | 5 | 5.6 | − | | | | | | | | | | | | | 0.1 | − | | | 1.3 | − |
| Almería | 42.4 | 2 | 45.4 | 3 | 5.8 | − | | | | | | | | | | | 3.5 | − | | | | | | |
| Asturias | 39.4 | 4 | 41.5 | 4 | 10.3 | 1 | | | | | | | | | | | | | | | | | | |
| Ávila | 61.2 | 2 | 28.0 | 1 | 5.5 | − | | | | | | | | | | | | | | | | | | |
| Badajoz | 41.9 | 3 | 46.8 | 3 | 7.2 | − | | | | | | | | | | | | | | | | | | |
| Balearic Islands | 47.1 | 5 | 27.7 | 2 | 3.7 | − | | | | | | | | | | | | | | | | | | |
| Barcelona | 17.2 | 6 | 37.3 | 13 | 2.4 | − | 26.0 | 9 | | | | | | | | | | | 5.3 | 1 | 6.2 | 2 | | |
| Biscay | 19.7 | 2 | 20.2 | 2 | 4.4 | − | | | 36.1 | 4 | | | | | 16.2 | 1 | | | | | | | | |
| Burgos | 52.1 | 3 | 32.0 | 1 | 6.1 | − | | | | | | | | | | | | | | | | | | |
| Cáceres | 43.5 | 2 | 46.0 | 3 | 4.4 | − | | | | | | | | | | | | | | | | | | |
| Cádiz | 36.1 | 3 | 38.6 | 4 | 9.1 | 1 | | | | | | | | | | | 11.9 | 1 | | | | | | |
| Cantabria | 54.4 | 3 | 34.3 | 2 | 5.0 | − | | | | | | | | | | | | | | | | | | |
| Castellón | 49.6 | 3 | 35.7 | 2 | 3.8 | − | | | | | | | | | | | | | 0.3 | − | | | 3.4 | − |
| Ceuta | 60.8 | 1 | 28.5 | − | 3.7 | − | | | | | | | | | | | | | | | | | | |
| Ciudad Real | 46.6 | 2 | 47.0 | 3 | 3.7 | − | | | | | | | | | | | | | | | | | | |
| Córdoba | 34.4 | 3 | 39.5 | 3 | 17.0 | 1 | | | | | | | | | | | 6.2 | − | | | | | | |
| Cuenca | 49.2 | 2 | 44.7 | 1 | 3.1 | − | | | | | | | | | | | | | | | | | | |
| Gipuzkoa | 15.1 | 1 | 18.0 | 1 | 3.0 | − | | | 33.4 | 2 | | | | | 27.4 | 2 | | | | | | | | |
| Girona | 12.1 | − | 26.1 | 2 | 1.2 | − | 42.3 | 3 | | | | | | | | | | | 8.5 | − | 3.4 | − | | |
| Granada | 38.2 | 3 | 45.0 | 4 | 8.8 | − | | | | | | | | | | | 4.7 | − | | | | | | |
| Guadalajara | 50.4 | 2 | 40.1 | 1 | 4.8 | − | | | | | | | | | | | | | | | | | | |
| Huelva | 36.3 | 2 | 44.2 | 3 | 10.9 | − | | | | | | | | | | | 6.2 | − | | | | | | |
| Huesca | 40.0 | 2 | 36.8 | 1 | 3.4 | − | | | | | | | | | | | | | | | | | | |
| Jaén | 35.6 | 2 | 47.9 | 4 | 10.2 | − | | | | | | | | | | | 4.0 | − | | | | | | |
| La Rioja | 53.5 | 2 | 36.8 | 2 | 4.0 | − | | | | | | | | | | | | | | | | | | |
| Las Palmas | 42.7 | 4 | 19.4 | 1 | 2.9 | − | | | | | | | 29.5 | 2 | | | | | | | | | | |
| León | 48.6 | 3 | 33.6 | 2 | 4.1 | − | | | | | | | | | | | | | | | | | | |
| Lleida | 16.9 | 1 | 26.3 | 1 | 0.7 | − | 39.3 | 2 | | | | | | | | | | | 8.4 | − | 2.6 | − | | |
| Lugo | 56.1 | 2 | 21.4 | 1 | 0.8 | − | | | | | 19.0 | 1 | | | | | | | | | | | | |
| Madrid | 49.3 | 18 | 36.8 | 13 | 8.0 | 3 | | | | | | | | | | | | | | | | | | |
| Málaga | 41.4 | 5 | 38.5 | 4 | 10.3 | 1 | | | | | | | | | | | 5.5 | − | | | | | | |
| Melilla | 50.1 | 1 | 37.5 | − | 4.5 | − | | | | | | | | | | | | | | | | | | |
| Murcia | 53.2 | 5 | 36.4 | 4 | 6.6 | − | | | | | | | | | | | | | | | | | | |
| Navarre | 42.1 | 3 | 24.8 | 1 | 5.4 | − | | | 5.7 | − | | | | | 15.1 | 1 | | | | | | | | |
| Ourense | 55.6 | 3 | 22.8 | 1 | 0.6 | − | | | | | 18.3 | − | | | | | | | | | | | | |
| Palencia | 51.9 | 2 | 37.6 | 1 | 4.9 | − | | | | | | | | | | | | | | | | | | |
| Pontevedra | 48.6 | 4 | 22.9 | 2 | 1.3 | − | | | | | 23.4 | 2 | | | | | | | | | | | | |
| Salamanca | 56.3 | 3 | 33.3 | 1 | 4.0 | − | | | | | | | | | | | | | | | | | | |
| Santa Cruz de Tenerife | 23.6 | 2 | 30.0 | 2 | 2.9 | − | | | | | | | 38.4 | 3 | | | | | | | | | | |
| Segovia | 55.5 | 2 | 31.6 | 1 | 5.4 | − | | | | | | | | | | | | | | | | | | |
| Seville | 30.0 | 4 | 47.5 | 7 | 11.4 | 1 | | | | | | | | | | | 7.7 | 1 | | | | | | |
| Soria | 56.5 | 2 | 32.4 | 1 | 4.5 | − | | | | | | | | | | | | | | | | | | |
| Tarragona | 19.3 | 1 | 29.4 | 2 | 1.2 | − | 33.8 | 3 | | | | | | | | | | | 7.5 | − | 3.5 | − | | |
| Teruel | 44.1 | 2 | 33.8 | 1 | 3.2 | − | | | | | | | | | | | | | | | | | | |
| Toledo | 48.3 | 3 | 44.7 | 2 | 4.1 | − | | | | | | | | | | | | | | | | | | |
| Valencia | 46.6 | 8 | 34.5 | 6 | 6.3 | 1 | | | | | | | | | | | | | 0.1 | − | | | 5.6 | 1 |
| Valladolid | 50.1 | 3 | 36.8 | 2 | 6.4 | − | | | | | | | | | | | | | | | | | | |
| Zamora | 55.1 | 2 | 34.4 | 1 | 3.6 | − | | | | | | | | | | | | | | | | | | |
| Zaragoza | 42.8 | 4 | 32.8 | 3 | 4.2 | − | | | | | | | | | | | | | | | | | | |
| Total | 39.7 | 162 | 35.3 | 135 | 5.8 | 9 | 4.0 | 17 | 1.9 | 7 | 1.6 | 5 | 1.3 | 5 | 1.3 | 4 | 1.2 | 2 | 0.8 | 1 | 0.7 | 2 | 0.4 | 1 |

=== Regions ===

Summary of regional results in the 13 June 1999 European Parliament election in Spain
| Region | PP | | PSOE–p | | IU–EUiA | | CiU | | PNV–EA | | BNG | | CC | | EH | | PA | | ERC–EV | | IC–V | | UV | |
| Region | % | S | % | S | % | S | % | S | % | S | % | S | % | S | % | S | % | S | % | S | % | S | % | S |
|---|---|---|---|---|---|---|---|---|---|---|---|---|---|---|---|---|---|---|---|---|---|---|---|---|
| Andalusia | 36.0 | 24 | 43.3 | 32 | 10.7 | 4 | | | | | | | | | | | 6.6 | 2 | | | | | | |
| Aragon | 42.5 | 8 | 33.7 | 5 | 4.0 | − | | | | | | | | | | | | | | | | | | |
| Asturias | 39.4 | 4 | 41.5 | 4 | 10.3 | 1 | | | | | | | | | | | | | | | | | | |
| Balearic Islands | 47.1 | 5 | 27.7 | 2 | 3.7 | − | | | | | | | | | | | | | | | | | | |
| Basque Country | 19.8 | 5 | 19.5 | 4 | 3.9 | − | | | 33.9 | 7 | | | | | 19.5 | 3 | | | | | | | | |
| Canary Islands | 33.4 | 6 | 24.5 | 3 | 2.9 | − | | | | | | | 33.8 | 5 | | | | | | | | | | |
| Cantabria | 54.4 | 3 | 34.3 | 2 | 5.0 | − | | | | | | | | | | | | | | | | | | |
| Castile and León | 52.8 | 22 | 33.8 | 11 | 5.0 | − | | | | | | | | | | | | | | | | | | |
| Castilla–La Mancha | 47.4 | 11 | 45.5 | 9 | 4.1 | − | | | | | | | | | | | | | | | | | | |
| Catalonia | 16.9 | 8 | 34.6 | 18 | 2.0 | − | 29.3 | 17 | | | | | | | | | | | 6.1 | 1 | 5.4 | 2 | | |
| Ceuta | 60.8 | 1 | 28.5 | − | 3.7 | − | | | | | | | | | | | | | | | | | | |
| Extremadura | 42.5 | 5 | 46.5 | 6 | 6.1 | − | | | | | | | | | | | | | | | | | | |
| Galicia | 49.9 | 14 | 23.6 | 6 | 1.1 | − | | | | | 22.0 | 5 | | | | | | | | | | | | |
| La Rioja | 53.5 | 2 | 36.8 | 2 | 4.0 | − | | | | | | | | | | | | | | | | | | |
| Madrid | 49.3 | 18 | 36.8 | 13 | 8.0 | 3 | | | | | | | | | | | | | | | | | | |
| Melilla | 50.1 | 1 | 37.5 | − | 4.5 | − | | | | | | | | | | | | | | | | | | |
| Murcia | 53.2 | 5 | 36.4 | 4 | 6.6 | − | | | | | | | | | | | | | | | | | | |
| Navarre | 42.1 | 3 | 24.8 | 1 | 5.4 | − | | | 5.7 | − | | | | | 15.1 | 1 | | | | | | | | |
| Valencian Community | 47.7 | 17 | 35.6 | 13 | 5.8 | 1 | | | | | | | | | | | | | 0.1 | − | | | 4.0 | 1 |
| Total | 39.7 | 162 | 35.3 | 135 | 5.8 | 9 | 4.0 | 17 | 1.9 | 7 | 1.6 | 5 | 1.3 | 5 | 1.3 | 4 | 1.2 | 2 | 0.8 | 1 | 0.7 | 2 | 0.4 | 1 |
