= European Coalition =

European Coalition was the name adopted by various electoral coalitions formed in Spain for elections to the European Parliament. The coalitions were headed by Canarian Coalition. In 2019 the European Coalition was formed in Poland for elections to the European Parliament in 2019 by liberals and post-communists associated with PO and SLD.

- European Coalition (1999), in the 1999 election.
- European Coalition (2004), in the 2004 election.
- European Coalition (Poland), in the 2019 election.
