= Zabell =

Zabell is a surname. Notable people with the surname include:

- Simon Zabell (born 1970), British artist
- Theresa Zabell (born 1965), Spanish sailor

== See also ==
- Zabel (disambiguation)
