= 1999 European Parliament election in Spain =

- 13 June 1999

All 64 Spanish seats in the European Parliament
- Opinion polls
- Registered: 33,840,432 ▲7.2%
- Turnout: 21,334,948 (63.0%) ▲3.9 pp
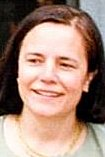

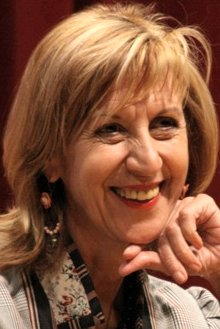

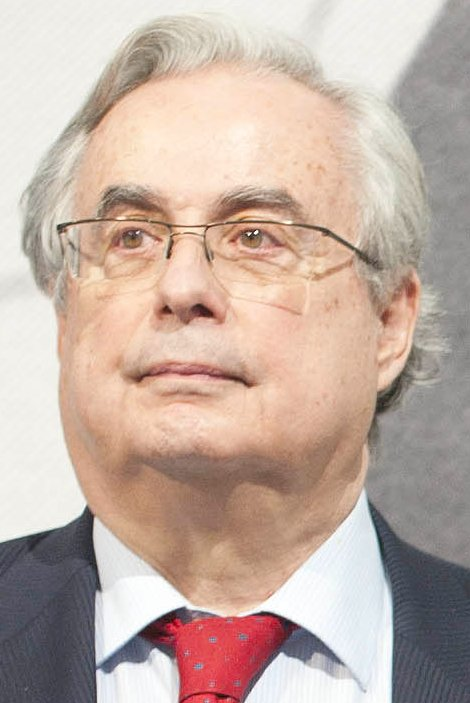

	First party	Second party	Third party
Leader	Loyola de Palacio	Rosa Díez	Alonso Puerta
Party	PP	PSOE–p	IU–EUiA
Alliance	EPP (EPP–ED)	PES	GUE/NGL
Leader since	22 April 1999	22 March 1999	2 March 1994
Leader's seat	Spain	Spain	Spain
Last election	28 seats, 40.1%	22 seats, 30.8%	9 seats, 11.9% (Note: Results for IU in the 1994 election, not including Catalonia.)
Seats won	27	24	4
Seat change	▼1	▲2	▼5
Popular vote	8,410,993	7,477,823	1,221,566
Percentage	39.7%	35.3%	5.8%
Swing	▼0.4 pp	▲4.5 pp	▼6.1 pp
	Fourth party	Fifth party	Sixth party
Leader	Pere Esteve	Isidoro Sánchez	Josu Ortuondo
Party	CiU	CE	CN–EP
Alliance	ELDR; EPP (EPP–ED)	ELDR; ERA (Greens/EFA)	Greens/EFA
Leader since	16 November 1998	1999	17 April 1999
Leader's seat	Spain	Spain	Spain
Last election	3 seats, 4.7%	0 seats, 2.2% (Note: Results for CN in Aragon, the Canary Islands and the Valencian Community (1.4%, 0 seats) and PA–PAP (0.8%, 0 seats) in the 1994 election.)	2 seats, 2.8% (Note: Results for CN, not including Aragon, the Canary Islands, Galicia and the Valencian Community (1.4%, 2 seats), PEP, not including Cantabria, Castile and León, Castilla–La Mancha, La Rioja and Madrid (1.3%, 0 seats) and EV–CEC (0.2%, 0 seats) in the 1994 election.)
Seats won	3	2	2
Seat change	0	▲2	0
Popular vote	937,687	677,094	613,968
Percentage	4.4%	3.2%	2.9%
Swing	▼0.3 pp	▲1.0 pp	▲0.1 pp

An election was held in Spain on 13 June 1999 as part of the concurrent EU-wide election to the 5th European Parliament. All 64 seats allocated to the Spanish constituency as per the Treaty of Amsterdam were up for election. It was held concurrently with regional elections in thirteen autonomous communities and local elections all across Spain.

The ruling People's Party (PP)—which for the first time contested a nationwide election in Spain while in government—emerged as the largest political force in the country, albeit with a diminished victory margin than in the previous election held in 1994. The Spanish Socialist Workers' Party (PSOE), in opposition for the first time since 1982, recovered some ground from its previous result. Overall, the PP lead decreased from 9.3 to 4.4 percentage points, though this was an increase from the 1.2 points between both parties in the 1996 general election. United Left (IU) lost half of its votes and parliamentary representation amid internal divisions—Initiative for Catalonia (IC) and the New Left (NI) had split from the larger alliance in 1997—policy differences over their relationship with the PSOE and the deteriorating health condition of IU's maverick leader, Julio Anguita.

== Overview ==
=== Electoral system ===
Voting for the European Parliament in Spain was based on universal suffrage, which comprised all Spanish nationals and resident non-national European citizens over 18 years of age with full political rights, provided that they had not been deprived of the right to vote by a final sentence, nor were legally incapacitated.

64 European Parliament seats were allocated to Spain as per the Treaty of Amsterdam. All were elected in a single multi-member constituency—comprising the entire national territory—using the D'Hondt method and closed-list proportional voting, with no electoral threshold. The use of this electoral method resulted in an effective threshold depending on district magnitude and vote distribution.

The law did not provide for by-elections to fill vacant seats; instead, any vacancies arising after the proclamation of candidates and during the legislative term were filled by the next candidates on the party lists or, when required, by designated substitutes.

=== Outgoing delegation ===
The table below shows the composition of the Spanish delegation in the chamber at the time of the election call.

Delegation composition in May 1999
Groups	Parties	MEPs	
Groups	Parties	Seats	Total
European People's Party	PP	26	29
European People's Party	UPN	2	29
European People's Party	UDC	1	29
Party of European Socialists	PSOE	21	21
European United Left–Nordic Green Left	IU	8	9
European United Left–Nordic Green Left	IC–V	1	9
European Radical Alliance	PAR	1	3
European Radical Alliance	CG	1	3
European Radical Alliance	INDEP	1 (Note: Antonio González Triviño, former PSOE MEP.)	3
European Liberal Democrat and Reform Party	CDC	2	2

== Parties and candidates ==
The electoral law allowed for parties and federations registered in the interior ministry, alliances and groupings of electors to present lists of candidates. Parties and federations intending to form an alliance were required to inform the relevant electoral commission within 10 days of the election call. In order to be entitled to run, parties, federations, alliances and groupings of electors needed to secure the signature of at least 15,000 registered electors; this requirement could be lifted and replaced through the signature of at least 50 elected officials—deputies, senators, MEPs or members from the legislative assemblies of autonomous communities or from local city councils. Electors and elected officials were disallowed from signing for more than one list.

Below is a list of the main parties and alliances which contested the election:

Candidacy	Parties and alliances	Leading candidate	Ideology	Previous result		Ref.
Candidacy	Parties and alliances	Leading candidate	Ideology	Vote %	Seats	Ref.
PP	List: People's Party (PP); Navarrese People's Union (UPN)	Loyola de Palacio	Conservatism; Christian democracy	40.1%	28	
PSOE–p	List: Spanish Socialist Workers' Party (PSOE); Socialists' Party of Catalonia (PSC); Democratic Party of the New Left (PDNI)	Rosa Díez	Social democracy	30.8%	22	
IU–EUiA	List: United Left (IU) – Communist Party of Spain (PCE) – Socialist Action Party (PASOC) – Republican Left (IR) – Collective for the Unity of Workers–Andalusian Left Bloc (CUT–BAI) – Revolutionary Workers' Party (POR) – Workers' Revolutionary Party (PRT); United and Alternative Left (EUiA) – Living Unified Socialist Party of Catalonia (PSUCviu) – Party of the Communists of Catalonia (PCC)	Alonso Puerta	Socialism; Communism	11.9%	9	
CiU	List: Convergence and Union (CiU) – Democratic Convergence of Catalonia (CDC) – Democratic Union of Catalonia (UDC); Valencian Nationalist Bloc (BNV); PSM–Nationalist Agreement (PSM–EN)	Pere Esteve	Catalan nationalism Centrism	4.7%	3	
CN–EP	List: Basque Nationalist Party (EAJ/PNV); Basque Solidarity (EA); Republican Left of Catalonia (ERC); Majorcan Union (UM); The Greens–Ecologist Confederation of Catalonia (EV–CEC)	Josu Ortuondo	Peripheral nationalism	2.8%	2	
CE	List: Canarian Coalition (CC); Andalusian Party (PA); Valencian Union (UV); Aragonese Party (PAR)	Isidoro Sánchez	Regionalism	2.2%	0	
LV–IP	List: Initiative for Catalonia–Greens (IC–V); The Greens (LV); Aragonese Union (CHA); Left of Galicia (EdeG); Andalusian Left (IA)	Antoni Gutiérrez	Green politics Eco-socialism; Left-wing nationalism	1.5% (Note: Results for IU in Catalonia in the 1994 election.)	0	
EH	List: Popular Unity (HB) – Basque Nationalist Action (EAE/ANV); Assembly (Batzarre); Stand Up (Zutik)	Koldo Gorostiaga	Basque independence Left-wing nationalism Revolutionary socialism	1.0% (Note: Results for HB in the 1994 election.)	0	
BNG	List: Galician Nationalist Bloc (BNG) – Galician People's Union (UPG) – Socialist Collective (CS) – Galician Nationalist Party–Galicianist Party (PNG–PG) – Nationalist Left (EN) – Inzar (Inzar) – Galician Unity (UG)	Camilo Nogueira	Galician nationalism Left-wing nationalism Socialism	0.7%	0	

== Opinion polls ==
The table below lists voting intention estimates in reverse chronological order, showing the most recent first and using the dates when the survey fieldwork was done, as opposed to the date of publication. Where the fieldwork dates are unknown, the date of publication is given instead. The highest percentage figure in each polling survey is displayed with its background shaded in the leading party's colour. If a tie ensues, this is applied to the figures with the highest percentages. The "Lead" column on the right shows the percentage-point difference between the parties with the highest percentages in a given poll. When available, seat projections are also displayed below the voting estimates in a smaller font.

Polling firm/Commissioner	Fieldwork date	Sample size	Turnout	PP	PSOE	IU	CiU	CN–EP	EH	BNG	CE	LV–IP	Lead
1999 EP election	13 Jun 1999	—N/a	63.0	39.7; 27	35.3; 24	5.8; 4	4.4; 3	2.9; 2	1.5; 1	1.6; 1	3.2; 2	1.4; 0	4.4
Ipsos–Eco Consulting/ABC	24 May–2 Jun 1999	2,000	?	40.9; 28	35.2; 24	10.4; 7	4.5; 3	2.4; 1	0.5; 0	0.5; 0	1.8; 1	–	5.7
Demoscopia/El País	26 May–1 Jun 1999	17,500	67	41.1; 28	35.6; 24	8.8; 5/6	5.2; 3	2.9; 1	–	1.8; 1	1.6; 1	1.4; 0/1	5.5
Sigma Dos/El Mundo	28–31 May 1999	2,600	?	41.8; 28/30	36.2; 24/26	7.9; 5	4.4; 3	2.4; 1	–	–	1.9; 1	1.2; 0	5.6
CIS	3–26 May 1999	4,797	?	41.5; 28/29	35.5; 24/25	8.1; 5/6	4.2; 2/3	2.3; 1	1.0; 0	1.0; 0	2.3; 1	2.4; 1	6.0
Metra Seis/Colpisa	14–20 May 1999	1,200	?	40.2; 27/29	36.8; 24/26	8.8; 5/7	4.7; 3	2.8; 1/2	0.9; 0	0.9; 0	2.8; 1/2	–	3.4
Gallup/El Correo	5–30 Mar 1999	2,031	?	41.0; 28	38.0; 26	9.0; 6	4.0; 2	? 1	–	–	? 1	–	3.0
Sigma Dos/El Mundo	26–27 Dec 1998	1,000	?	43.4; 30/31	35.1; 24/25	8.2; 5/6	4.1; 2/3	2.3; 1	–	–	–	–	8.3
1994 EP election	12 Jun 1994	—N/a	59.1	40.1; 28	30.8; 22	13.4; 9	4.7; 3	4.1; 2	1.0; 0	0.7; 0	–	–	9.3

== Results ==
=== Overall ===
← Summary of the 13 June 1999 European Parliament election results in Spain →
Parties and alliances	Popular vote			Seats	
Parties and alliances	Votes	%	±pp	Total	+/−
People's Party (PP)	8,410,993	39.74	−0.38	27	−1
Spanish Socialist Workers' Party–Progressives (PSOE–p)	7,477,823	35.33	+4.54	24	+2
United Left–United and Alternative Left (IU–EUiA)^{1}	1,221,566	5.77	−6.15	4	−5
Convergence and Union (CiU)	937,687	4.43	−0.23	3	±0
European Coalition (CE)^{2}	677,094	3.20	+1.03	2	+2
Nationalist Coalition–Europe of the Peoples (CN–EP)^{3}	613,968	2.90	+0.06	2	±0
Galician Nationalist Bloc (BNG)	349,079	1.65	+0.90	1	+1
Basque Citizens (EH)^{4}	306,923	1.45	+0.48	1	+1
The Greens–Left of the Peoples (LV–IP)^{5}	300,874	1.42	−0.11	0	±0
The Greens–Green Group (LV–GV)	138,835	0.66	+0.07	0	±0
Centrist Union–Democratic and Social Centre (UC–CDS)	38,911	0.18	−0.81	0	±0
Leonese People's Union (UPL)	33,604	0.16	New	0	±0
Confederation of Feminist Organizations (COFEM/FEMEK)	28,901	0.14	New	0	±0
Communist Party of the Peoples of Spain (PCPE)	26,189	0.12	−0.04	0	±0
Asturian Renewal Union (URAS)	22,400	0.11	New	0	±0
Party for Independence (PI)	17,544	0.08	New	0	±0
Spanish Democratic Party (PADE)	16,001	0.08	New	0	±0
United Extremadura (EU)	15,716	0.07	±0.00	0	±0
Asturianist Party (PAS)	15,299	0.07	−0.01	0	±0
Independent Spanish Phalanx (FEI)	13,940	0.07	+0.04	0	±0
Commoners' Land–Castilian Nationalist Party (TC–PNC)^{6}	13,267	0.06	+0.04	0	±0
Alliance for National Unity (AUN)	12,486	0.06	New	0	±0
Humanist Party (PH)	12,415	0.06	+0.02	0	±0
The Phalanx (FE)	10,792	0.05	New	0	±0
Independent Socialists of Extremadura (SIEx)	10,040	0.05	New	0	±0
Regionalist Unity of Castile and León (URCL)	9,950	0.05	±0.00	0	±0
Andalusia Assembly (A)	8,750	0.04	New	0	±0
Natural Law Party (PLN)	8,671	0.04	New	0	±0
Party of Self-employed of Spain and Spanish Independent Groups (PAE–I)	8,394	0.04	New	0	±0
Valencian Community Alternative (ACV)	8,073	0.04	New	0	±0
National Democracy (DN)	8,053	0.04	New	0	±0
Andecha Astur (AA)	7,321	0.03	New	0	±0
Union of Regions (UDR)	7,251	0.03	New	0	±0
Extremaduran Coalition (PREx–CREx)^{7}	7,230	0.03	±0.00	0	±0
Regionalist Party of the Leonese Country (PREPAL)	6,977	0.03	±0.00	0	±0
Coalition for the Repeal of the Maastricht Treaty (DM)^{8}	5,664	0.03	−0.01	0	±0
Blank ballots	357,583	1.69	+0.54		
Total	21,166,264			64	±0
Valid votes	21,166,264	99.21	−0.33		
Invalid votes	168,684	0.79	+0.33		
Votes cast / turnout	21,334,948	63.05	+3.91		
Abstentions	12,505,484	36.95	−3.91		
Registered voters	33,840,432				
Sources
Footnotes: ^{1} United Left–United and Alternative Left results are compared to United Left totals in the 1994 election, not including Catalonia.; ^{2} European Coalition results are compared to the combined totals of Nationalist Coalition in Aragon, the Canary Islands and the Valencian Community and Andalusian Coalition–Andalusian Power in the 1994 election.; ^{3} Nationalist Coalition–Europe of the Peoples results are compared to the combined totals of Nationalist Coalition—not including results in Aragon, the Canary Islands, Galicia and the Valencian Community—, For the Europe of the Peoples—not including results in Cantabria, Castile and León, Castilla–La Mancha, La Rioja and Madrid—and The Greens–Ecologist Confederation of Catalonia in the 1994 election.; ^{4} Basque Citizens results are compared to Popular Unity totals in the 1994 election.; ^{5} The Greens–Left of the Peoples results are compared to United Left totals in Catalonia in the 1994 election.; ^{6} Commoners' Land–Castilian Nationalist Party results are compared to For the Europe of the Peoples totals in Cantabria, Castile and León, Castilla–La Mancha, La Rioja and Madrid in the 1994 election.; ^{7} Extremaduran Coalition results are compared to Extremaduran Regionalist Party totals in the 1994 election.; ^{8} Coalition for the Repeal of the Maastricht Treaty results are compared to Coalition for a New Socialist Party totals in the 1994 election.

Popular vote
PP	39.74%
PSOE–p	35.33%
IU–EUiA	5.77%
CiU	4.43%
CE	3.20%
CN–EP	2.90%
BNG	1.65%
EH	1.45%
LV–IP	1.42%
Others	2.42%
Blank ballots	1.69%

Seats
PP	42.19%
PSOE–p	37.50%
IU–EUiA	6.25%
CiU	4.69%
CE	3.13%
CN–EP	3.13%
BNG	1.56%
EH	1.56%

=== Maps ===
Vote winner strength by province.

Vote winner strength by autonomous community.

=== Distribution by European group ===
Summary of political group distribution in the 5th European Parliament (1999–2004)
Groups	Parties	Seats	Total	%
European People's Party–European Democrats (EPP–ED)	People's Party (PP); Navarrese People's Union (UPN); Democratic Union of Catalonia (UDC)	26; 1; 1	28	43.75
Party of European Socialists (PES)	Spanish Socialist Workers' Party (PSOE); Democratic Party of the New Left (PDNI)	22; 2	24	37.50
Greens–European Free Alliance (Greens/EFA)	Basque Nationalist Party (EAJ/PNV); Basque Solidarity (EA); Andalusian Party (PA); Galician Nationalist Bloc (BNG)	1; 1; 1; 1	4	6.25
European United Left–Nordic Green Left (GUE/NGL)	United Left (IU)	4	4	6.25
European Liberal Democrat and Reform Party (ELDR)	Democratic Convergence of Catalonia (CDC); Canarian Coalition (CC)	2; 1	3	4.69
Non-Inscrits (NI)	Basque Citizens (EH)	1	1	1.56
Total		64	64	100.00

=== Elected legislators ===
The following table lists the elected legislators:

Elected legislators
#	Name	List
1	Loyola Palacio Valle-Lersundi	PP
2	Rosa María Díez González	PSOE–p
3	José María Gil-Robles Gil-Delgado	PP
4	José María Obiols i Germa (Raimon)	PSOE–p
5	José Gerardo Galeote Quecedo	PP
6	Francisca Sauquillo Pérez del Arco	PSOE–p
7	Alejo Vidal-Quadras Roca	PP
8	Enrique Barón Crespo	PSOE–p
9	María del Carmen Fraga Estévez	PP
10	María del Carmen Cerdeira Morterero	PSOE–p
11	Mónica María Ridruejo Ostrowska	PP
12	Carlos Westendorp y Cabeza	PSOE–p
13	Alonso José Puerta Gutiérrez	IU–EUiA
14	Theresa María Zabell Lucas	PP
15	Manuel Medina Ortega	PSOE–p
16	José Manuel García-Margallo Marfil	PP
17	Pere Esteve i Abad	CiU
18	José María Mendiluce Pereiro	PSOE–p
19	José Javier Pomes Ruiz	PP
20	Ana Isabel Palacio del Valle-del Lersundi	PP
21	Bárbara Dührkop Dührkop	PSOE–p
22	Alejandro Agag Longo	PP
23	Pedro Aparicio Sánchez	PSOE–p
24	Encarnación Redondo Jiménez	PP
25	Luis Francisco Berenguer Fuster	PSOE–p
26	Salvador Jove Peres	IU–EUiA
27	Isidoro Sánchez García	CE
28	Juan Ojeda Sanz	PP
29	Juan de Dios Izquierdo Collado	PSOE–p
30	Josu Ortuondo Larrea	CN–EP
31	Laura de la Paz Mercedes González Álvarez	IU–EUiA
32	Fernando Manuel Fernández Martín	PP
33	María Elena Valenciano Martínez-Orozco	PSOE–p
34	Jaime Valdivielso de-Cue	PP
35	Carlos Carnero González	PSOE–p
36	Juan Manuel Fabra Valles	PP
37	María Izquierdo Rojo	PSOE–p
38	María del Pilar Ayuso González	PP
39	Concepció Ferrer i Casals	CiU
40	Alejandro Cercas Alonso	PSOE–p
41	Íñigo Méndez de Vigo Montojo	PP
42	José Ignacio Salafranca Sánchez-Neyra	PP
43	Joan Colom i Naval	PSOE–p
44	Manuel Pérez Álvarez	PP
45	María Rodríguez Ramos	PSOE–p
46	Pedro Marset Campos	IU–EUiA
47	Cristina García-Orcoyen Tormo	PP
48	Miguel Ángel Martínez Martínez	PSOE–p
49	Daniel Luis Varela Suanzes-Carpegna	PP
50	María Sornosa Martínez	PSOE–p
51	María Antonia Avilés Perea	PP
52	Fernando Pérez Royo	PSOE–p
53	Salvador Garriga Polledo	PP
54	Camilo Nogueira Román	BNG
55	Ana Terrón Cusi	PSOE–p
56	Carlos Bautista Ojeda	CE
57	Carlos Bartolomé Ripoll i Martínez de Bedoya	PP
58	Emilio Menéndez del Valle	PSOE–p
59	Jorge Salvador Hernández Mollar	PP
60	Carles Alfred Gasòliba i Böhm	CiU
61	Rosa María Miguélez Ramos	PSOE–p
62	Cristina Gutiérrez-Cortines Corral	PP
63	Gorka Knörr Borras	CN–EP
64	Koldo Gorostiaga Atxalandabaso	EH

== Bibliography ==
- Ley Orgánica 5/1985, de 19 de junio, del Régimen Electoral General (Organic Law 5/1985). Official State Gazette (in Spanish). 19 June 1985 [version as of 22 April 1999]. BOE-A-1985-11672.
- Treaty of Amsterdam amending the Treaty on European Union, the Treaties establishing the European Communities and certain related acts (97/C 340/01). Official Journal of the European Communities. 10 November 1997. 11997D/TXT.
- Consolidated version of the Treaty establishing the European Community (97/C 340/03). Official Journal of the European Communities. 10 November 1997. 11997E/TXT.
