= Zabel =

Zabel may refer to:

- Zabel (engine), a German two-stroke motocross engine
- Lord Raptor (Zabel Zarock), a character from the Darkstalkers video game series
- Maja Zabel, a mountain peak in northern Albania and south-eastern Montenegro
- Zabel Point, Antarctica

== People ==
- Zabel of Armenia (1217–1252), queen regnant of Armenian Cilicia
- Zabel (given name)
- Zabel (surname)

== See also ==
- Zabell, a surname
