= Koldo Gorostiaga =

Spanish Basque lecturer and politician

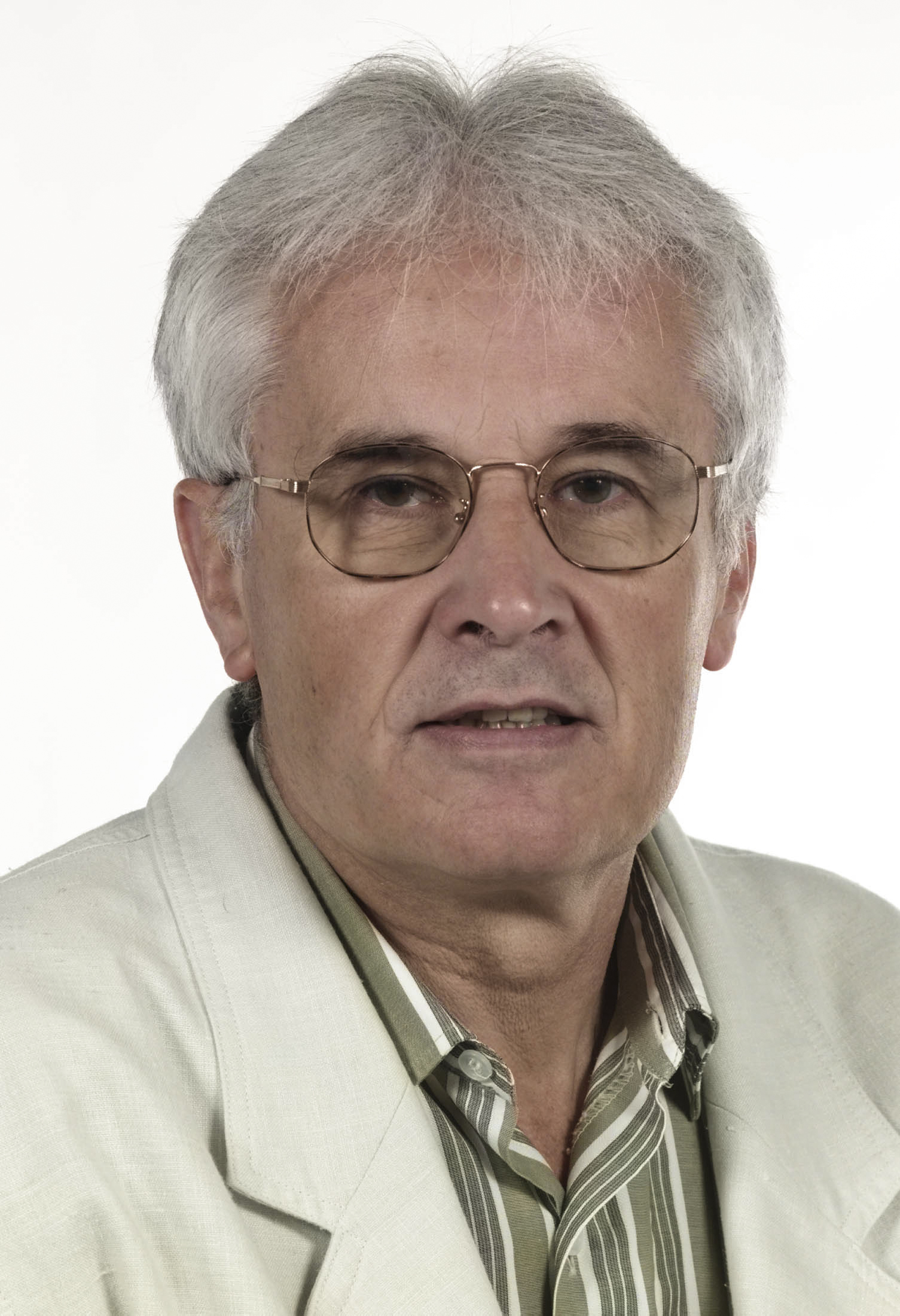
- Official portrait, 1999

Member of the European Parliament for Spain
- In office 1999–2004

Personal details
- Born: Koldo Gorostiaga Atxalandabaso; 30 May 1940 (age 86) Bilbao, Spain
- Party: Euskal Herritarrok
- Other political affiliations: Batasuna
- Education: University of Valladolid; University of Deusto; University of Barcelona; University of Cambridge

Koldo Gorostiaga Atxalandabaso (born 30 May 1940) is a Spanish Basque university lecturer in law and economics, and politician. He served one term in the European Parliament from 1999 to 2004 as a representative of Batasuna, a Basque nationalist party.

== Law lecturer ==
Gorostiaga was born in Bilbao and educated at the University of Valladolid and the University of Deusto, earning a law degree in 1963. He obtained a Doctor of Laws from the University of Barcelona in 1966, and later obtained a certificate of proficiency in English from Cambridge University. He has worked as a lecturer at the University of Barcelona and the University of Pau. He is also a Professor of the Basque Summer University, and a Professor and founding Director of the Cooperative Institute for Law and Social Economy at the University of the Basque Country.

== Politics ==
Living mostly in the French Basque Country, Gorostiaga began working for the European Bureau for Lesser-used Languages in 1995, and also became a member of the Basque Country's Economic and Social Council. At the 1999 European Parliament election, Gorostiaga was nominated as Euskal Herritarrok candidate. He was elected to the last seat.
