= The Greens–Left of the Peoples =

The Greens–Left of the Peoples Los Verdes–Las Izquierdas de los Pueblos
- Founded: 1999
- Dissolved: 2004
- Succeeded by: Europe of the Peoples (2004)
- Ideology: Green politics Left-wing nationalism
- Political position: Left-wing

The Greens–Left of the Peoples (Spanish: Los Verdes–Las Izquierdas de los Pueblos, LV–IP) was a Spanish electoral list in the European Parliament election in 1999 made up from green and left-wing peripheral nationalist parties.

== Composition ==
Party	Scope
Initiative for Catalonia–Greens (IC–V)	Catalonia
The Greens (LV)	Nationwide
Aragonese Union (CHA)	Aragon
Left of Galicia (EdeG)	Galicia
Andalusian Left (IA)	Andalusia

== Electoral performance ==
=== European Parliament ===
European Parliament
Election	Votes	%	#	Seats	+/–	Leading candidate
1999	300,874	1.4%	9th	0 / 64	0	Antoni Gutiérrez Díaz
