= Democratic Party of the New Left =

Political party in Spain

Democratic Party of the New Left Partido Democrático de la Nueva Izquierda
- President: Cristina Almeida
- Secretary-General: Diego López Garrido
- Founded: 1996
- Dissolved: 2001
- Split from: United Left
- Merged into: Spanish Socialist Workers' Party (PSOE)
- Ideology: Social democracy Ecologism; Progressivism
- Political position: Centre-left
- National affiliation: PSOE (1999-2001)
- Union affiliation: Comisiones Obreras (CCOO)
- Congress of Deputies (1997-2000): 3 / 350
- Congress of Deputies (2000-2001): 3 / 350 Within the PSOE
- European Parliament (1999-2001): 2 / 64 Within the PSOE

Democratic Party of the New Left (in Spanish: Partido Democrático de la Nueva Izquierda; PDNI) was a social democratic and ecologist political party in Spain. It was created in 1996 by a group that split from the United Left (IU) led by Cristina Almeida and Diego López Garrido.

== History ==
PDNI was founded after the "Nueva Izquierda" (New Left, NI) internal current of IU that was critical with the leadership of Julio Anguita and his confrontational attitude with the Spanish Socialist Workers' Party (PSOE) were expelled from the governing bodies of the coalition. This happened after the MPs linked with this current distanced themselves from the rest of the parliamentary group and refused to reject a labor reform that created a new type of contract, with a cheaper dismissal than the ordinary ones. The MPs of NI left IU and remained in Congress as part of the Mixed Group. In September of the same year the party was officially founded.

In 1999, PDNI sealed an electoral agreement with the PSOE to participate jointly in the next elections. Thanks to this agreement PDNI elected three MPs in Congress, about twenty in the autonomic parliaments, two in the European Parliament, and about 300 town councilors PDNI in socialist lists.

In October 2000, the party integrated itself organically into the structures of the PSOE. This decision was ratified at the Second Federal Congress of the organization, in March 2001 (65% of the vote in favour). With this decision, the party disappeared and fully integrated itself into the PSOE. However, small sectors did not accept this decision and formed two small independent ecologist parties, Green Network in Madrid and Green Left - Initiative for the Valencian Country.
