= Zabel (surname) =

Zabel is the surname of the following people:

- Bryce Zabel (born 1954), American television producer, director, writer and actor
- Carl Zabel (1837–?), American merchant and manufacturer
- David Zabel, American television producer and writer
- Erik Zabel (born 1970), German road bicycle racer, father of Rick
- Grey Zabel (born 2002), American football player
- Hermann Zabel (1832–1912), German botanist
- Igor Zabel (1958–2005), Slovene art historian, curator, writer and essayist
- Jim Zabel (1921–2013), American sports broadcaster
- Joe Zabel (born 1953), American comic book artist
- Mark Zabel (born 1973), German sprint canoer and surfski competitor
- Morton Dauwen Zabel (1901–1964), American literary critic and editor
- Nellie Zabel Willhite (1892–1991), American aviator
- Rick Zabel (born 1993), German road bicycle racer, son of Erik
- Sarah E. Zabel (born 1965), American government official
- Steve Zabel (born 1948), American football player
- Zip Zabel (1891–1970), American baseball pitcher
