= Carmen Cerdeira =

Spanish politician (1958–2007)

Member of the European Parliament
- In office 1999–2004

Government Delegate of Ceuta
- In office 1994–1996

Member of the Senate of Spain
- In office 1986–1989

Personal details
- Born: 27 September 1958 Ceuta, Spain
- Died: 2 August 2007 (aged 48) Ceuta, Spain
- Party: Spanish Socialist Workers' Party
- Other political affiliations: Party of European Socialists
- Occupation: Lawyer

María del Carmen Cerdeira Morterero (27 September 1958 – 2 August 2007) was a Spanish politician. She was a member of the European Parliament from 1999 to 2004 as a member of the Spanish Socialist Workers' Party.

The daughter of Clemente Cerdeira Garcia de la Torre, she was born in Ceuta. She earned a law degree and worked as a lawyer before entering politics. She was elected to the Senate of Spain in 1986. In 1993, she was named executive advisor to the Spanish Ministry of Justice and, from 1994 to 1996, was a delegate of the Spanish government in the city of Ceuta.

She had been president of the Sociedad Estatal para la Acción Cultural Exterior since 2004.

In 2003, she was awarded the Premio María de Eza.

Cerdeira died in a Ceuta hospital at the age of 48 after a seven-year battle with cancer.

An annual award, the Premio Carmen Cerdeira, was established in her honour.
