= Simon Zabell =

British-Spanish artist

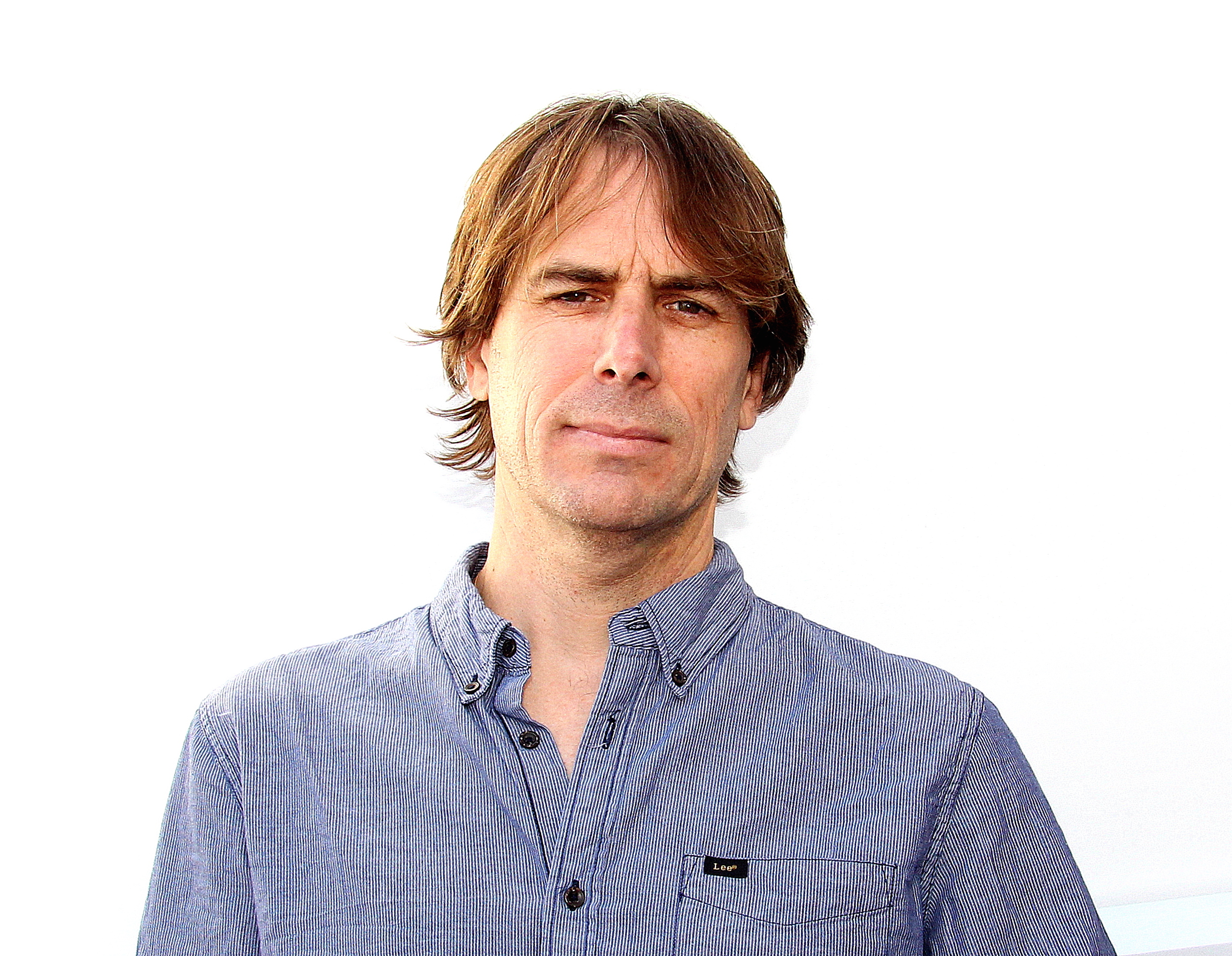
- Zabell in 2015
- Born: 1970 (age 55–56); Málaga, Spain
- Education: Slade School of Fine Art
- Occupation: Artist
- Years active: 1995 - present
- Known for: Painting, sculpture, installation art
- Spouse: Elena Carcedo González

Simon Zabell (born 1970) is a British artist living and working in Spain.

== Biography ==
Zabell was born in Málaga to an English family that had recently emigrated to Spain. After growing up in Málaga and London he studied painting and sculpture at the University of Granada, and then went on to study theatre design at the Slade School of Fine Art. He currently lives in Granada where he teaches contemporary sculpture at the city's university. Simon Zabell is a brother of double olympic gold-medalist Theresa Zabell.

== Work ==
After being initially enthusiastic about more formalist art forms, his interest in literature and music led him to become increasingly attracted to the narrative possibilities of painting, sculpture and installation art. This lead him to enroll on a theatre design MFA course at the Slade School of Fine Art in London under the teachings of Philip Prowse.

Since then he has typically produced art projects that are constructed around research into previous creations or events such as a novel, film or musical composition. He has produced projects based on novels by French author Alain Robbe-Grillet (Jealousy, The Voyeur and The House of Assignation), Yasujirō Ozu's film Late Autumn, music by Olivier Messiaen and the Hawaiian Royal Family.

In recent years most of Zabell's projects and research has revolved around issues related to Polynesian culture, such as historical aspects of Hawaiian music and the South Sea writings of Robert Louis Stevenson. In 2017 Zabell released a short documentary film directed by Gonzalo Posada León - Our Man in Tahiti - which covers his search for the true meaning of Stevenson's late novel, The Ebb-Tide.
