= Nationalist Coalition–Europe of the Peoples =

Nationalist Coalition–Europe of the Peoples Coalición Nacionalista–Europa de los Pueblos
- Abbreviation: CN–EP
- Founded: 1999
- Dissolved: 2004
- Preceded by: Nationalist Coalition (1994); For the Europe of the Peoples (1994)
- Succeeded by: Europe of the Peoples (2004); Galeusca–Peoples of Europe
- Ideology: Peripheral nationalism
- European Parliament group: The Greens–European Free Alliance

Nationalist Coalition–Europe of the Peoples (Spanish: Coalición Nacionalista–Europa de los Pueblos, CN–EP) was a Spanish electoral list in the European Parliament election in 1999 made up from regionalist and peripheral nationalist parties. It was the successor of the 1994 Nationalist Coalition and For the Europe of the Peoples.

== Composition ==
| Party | Scope |
|---|---|
| Basque Nationalist Party (EAJ/PNV) | Basque Country, Navarre |
| Basque Solidarity (EA) | Basque Country, Navarre |
| Republican Left of Catalonia (ERC) | Catalonia, Valencian Community |
| Majorcan Union (UM) | Balearic Islands |
| The Greens–Ecologist Confederation of Catalonia (EV–CEC) | Catalonia |

== Electoral performance ==
=== European Parliament ===
European Parliament
| Election | Vote | % | Score | Seats | +/– |
| 1999 | 613,968 | 2.9 | 6th | 2 / 64 | 0 |
