= Nationalist Coalition (1994) =

Nationalist Coalition Coalición Nacionalista
- Abbreviation: CN
- Founded: 1994
- Dissolved: 1999
- Preceded by: Nationalist Coalition (1989); Federation of Regional Parties
- Succeeded by: Nationalist Coalition–Europe of the Peoples; European Coalition (1999)
- Ideology: Peripheral nationalism Regionalism
- European Parliament group: European People's Party; European Radical Alliance

The Nationalist Coalition (Spanish: Coalición Nacionalista, CN) was a Spanish electoral list in the European Parliament election in 1994, made up from regionalist parties. It was the successor of the 1989 coalition of the same name.

== Composition ==
Party	Scope
Basque Nationalist Party (EAJ/PNV)	Basque Country, Navarre
Canarian Coalition (CC)	Canary Islands
Valencian Union (UV)	Valencian Community
Aragonese Party (PAR)	Aragon
Galician Coalition (CG)	Galicia
Majorcan Union (UM)	Balearic Islands

== Electoral performance ==
European Parliament
Election	Vote	%	Score	Seats	+/–
1994	518,532	2.8	5th	2 / 64	1
