= European Coalition (1999) =

European Coalition Coalición Europea
- Abbreviation: CE
- Founded: 1999
- Dissolved: 2004
- Preceded by: Nationalist Coalition (1994)
- Succeeded by: European Coalition (2004)
- Ideology: Regionalism; Moderate nationalism
- Political position: Centre-right

European Coalition (Spanish: Coalición Europea, CE) was a Spanish electoral list in the European Parliament election in 1999 made up from centre-right, regionalist and moderate nationalist parties.

== Composition ==
Party	Scope
Canarian Coalition (CC)	Canary Islands
Andalusian Party (PA)	Andalusia
Valencian Union (UV)	Valencian Community
Aragonese Party (PAR)	Aragon

== Electoral performance ==
=== European Parliament ===
European Parliament
Election	Vote	%	Seats
1999	677,094 (#5)	3.20	2 / 64
