= Theresa Zabell =

Spanish sailor

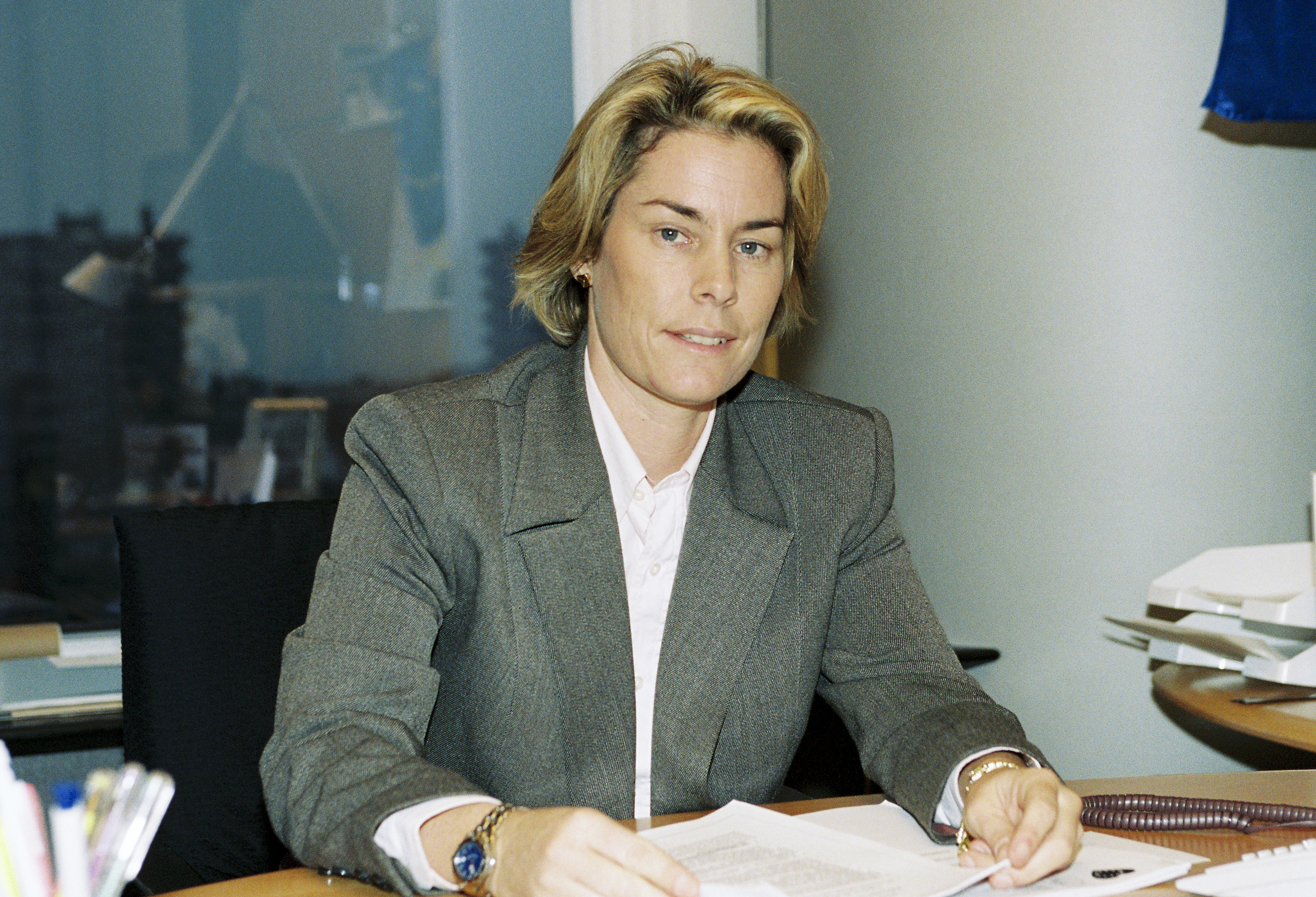
- Theresa Zabell in December 1999 at the European parliament.

Personal information
- Full name: Theresa Zabell Lucas
- Born: 22 May 1965 (age 61) Ipswich, Suffolk (GBR)
Medal record
Women's sailing
Representing Spain
Olympic Games
| Gold medal – first place | 1992 Barcelona | 470 class |
| Gold medal – first place | 1996 Atlanta | 470 class |

Theresa Zabell Lucas (Note: In this Spanish name, the first or paternal surname is Zabell and the second or maternal family name is Lucas.) (born 22 May 1965 in Ipswich, Suffolk) is a Spanish sailor who won gold medal both in the 1992 Summer Olympics in Barcelona, and in the 1996 Summer Olympics in Atlanta, Georgia. A member of Real Club de Mediterráneo Málaga she competes in the 470 class.

She is elected member of the European parliament at the 1999 European Parliament election for one term and sits with the European People's Party group.

Theresa Zabell is a sister of artist Simon Zabell.
