= National Alliance (Spain) =

National Alliance Alianza Nacional
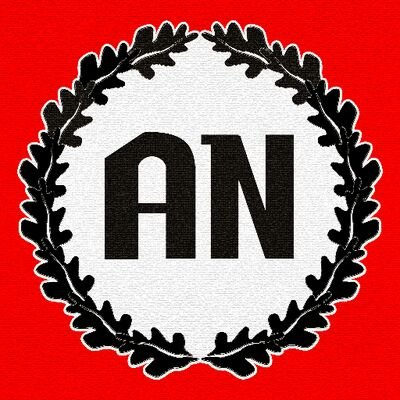
- Leader: Pedro Pablo Peña
- Founded: 2005
- Youth wing: Frente de Juventudes
- Ideology: Neo-Nazism; Neo-fascism; Spanish nationalism Anti-immigration; Spanish unionism Anti-Americanism; Right-wing antiglobalism
- Political position: Far-right

Website
- Official website

National Alliance (AN) (Spanish: Alianza Nacional) is a Neo-Nazi political party in Spain. The party was founded in 2005 after the formation of the Alliance for National Unity and the King Sisebut Cultural Association. Its first congress was held on April 30, 2006 in Valencia, although they had held public appearances since the previous year.

== Ideology and policies ==
AN declares itself the ideological heir of European fascism and argues that the "jus sanguinis" (Right of Blood) should be used to determine the national origin of an individual. As well as these racial criteria, they are committed to a socialist economic policy, hence the theme of the training slogan: "Nation, Race, Socialism". Displays often incorporate party symbols adopted from other nationalist and extreme right organizations. They also promote the expulsion of immigrants from Spain and are against same-sex marriage. AN acknowledges as a major ideological and political influence nationalist Ramiro Ledesma Ramos and JONS and his calls for direct action.

Party leader Pedro Pablo Peña, known for his irritable, argumentative demeanor and his outbursts justifying "bloodbaths" in Catalonia, has displayed an inconsistent worldview, at times holding back his hostility towards Israeli Jews or ETA on account of their ability to defend themselves ("I admire whoever fights") to the point of even confronting other far-right activists in seemingly spontaneous episodes, and yet, most often, ridiculing Israel's alleged military incompetence and bridging the gap between anti-Zionism and anti-Semitism with claims about the Holo-hoax (holocuento).

=== National Alliance manifesto ===
The National Alliance manifesto includes:

- Defending the indivisibility of the Spanish state, particularly as regards its territorial integrity and as an administrative unit; opposing any form of separatism.
- The tightening of immigration control and the immediate expulsion of all undocumented immigrants within the country, and the reversal of regularization measures implemented by PP and PSOE governments.
- Preferential treatment of the ethnically Spanish in access to public services and public sector employment at the expense of foreign nationals.
- A Clause of the State, recognizing the contribution of Catholicism in the historical construction of Spain.
- Tighter state regulation of the means of production and banking, limiting what they term "interest slavery".
- Opposition to the privatization of the public sector.
- Suppression of institutions or groups that, according to AN, "threaten the unity of Spain."
- Claiming Greek, Latin and Visigoth heritage as the "original roots of the Spanish ethnicity". AN argue that the "coexistence of three cultures" is just a historical distortion. They reject the theories which they designate "cultural homogenization" or "globalization" and argue that these are imposed by the United States.

=== National Action Alliance policy ===
AN is based on his political agitation and advertising. Opting for performing acts such as those in Valencia on May 1 of 2006 and in Malaga on October 12 of that year in April or in Segovia on May 1, 2007. These calls have followed many different points Spain. Their first date was in electoral Spanish municipal elections of 2007, when it presented list in several municipalities of Valencia and Catalonia as Chiva, Canals and Tarragona, and in Malaga and other municipalities in small Castilla y León, without obtain representation. The list presented in Chiva was particularly controversial locally because one candidate served time for the murder in 1993 of the young Guillem Agulló activist Valencian group independence Maulets. 10 Subsequently, AN has attended under the acronym for the first time to the Spanish general elections of 2008 in a total of 25 provinces, getting 2780 votes to the Congress of Deputies. 11 and a total of 14,680 candidates in the Senate, being Madrid constituency with the most votes, 11 628. 12 o en Segovia el 1 de mayo de 2007. These have been followed by many other calls in different parts of Spain.

== History ==
=== Assassination of Guillem Agulló ===
Guillem Agulló i Salvador (Burjassot, 1975 – Montanejos, April 11, 1993) was a young Valencian leftist, who was killed on the morning of April 11, 1993 in Montanejos, Alto Mijares region (Castellón province). He was stabbed by a group of young fascists. During the trial of the case in Castellón de la Plana in 1995, the judge sentenced one defendant who confessed to the stabbing, Pedro Cuevas, to 14 years in prison for murder and acquitted the rest of the accused. A few days later, one of the defendants, Juan Manuel Sánchez, participated in another knife attack in the Carmen district of Valencia. Cuevas Pedro was released after serving only 4 years of his 14-year sentence. Following his release, he ran in the municipal elections of 27 May 2007 for the far-right National Alliance party. Another of those involved, Manuel Canduela, currently chairs the far-right political party National Democracy.

=== Catalonia Day attack ===
A group of National Alliance members attacked the Catalonia Day ceremony at the Blanquerna cultural centre of Generalitat de Catalunya in Madrid on 11 September 2013. The perpetrators shouted slogans, physically attacked participants and desecrated Catalan flags, dropping tear gas canisters prior to fleeing the compound. Twelve suspects were detained the following day.
