= 2009 European Parliament election in Spain =

- 7 June 2009

All 54 (Note: Note that, once the Treaty of Lisbon came into force on 1 December 2011, Spain's MEP delegation was increased from 50 to 54 and applied retroactively.) Spanish seats in the European Parliament
- Opinion polls
- Registered: 35,492,567 ▲2.3%
- Turnout: 15,935,147 (44.9%) ▼0.2 pp
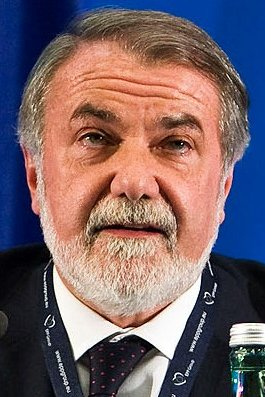

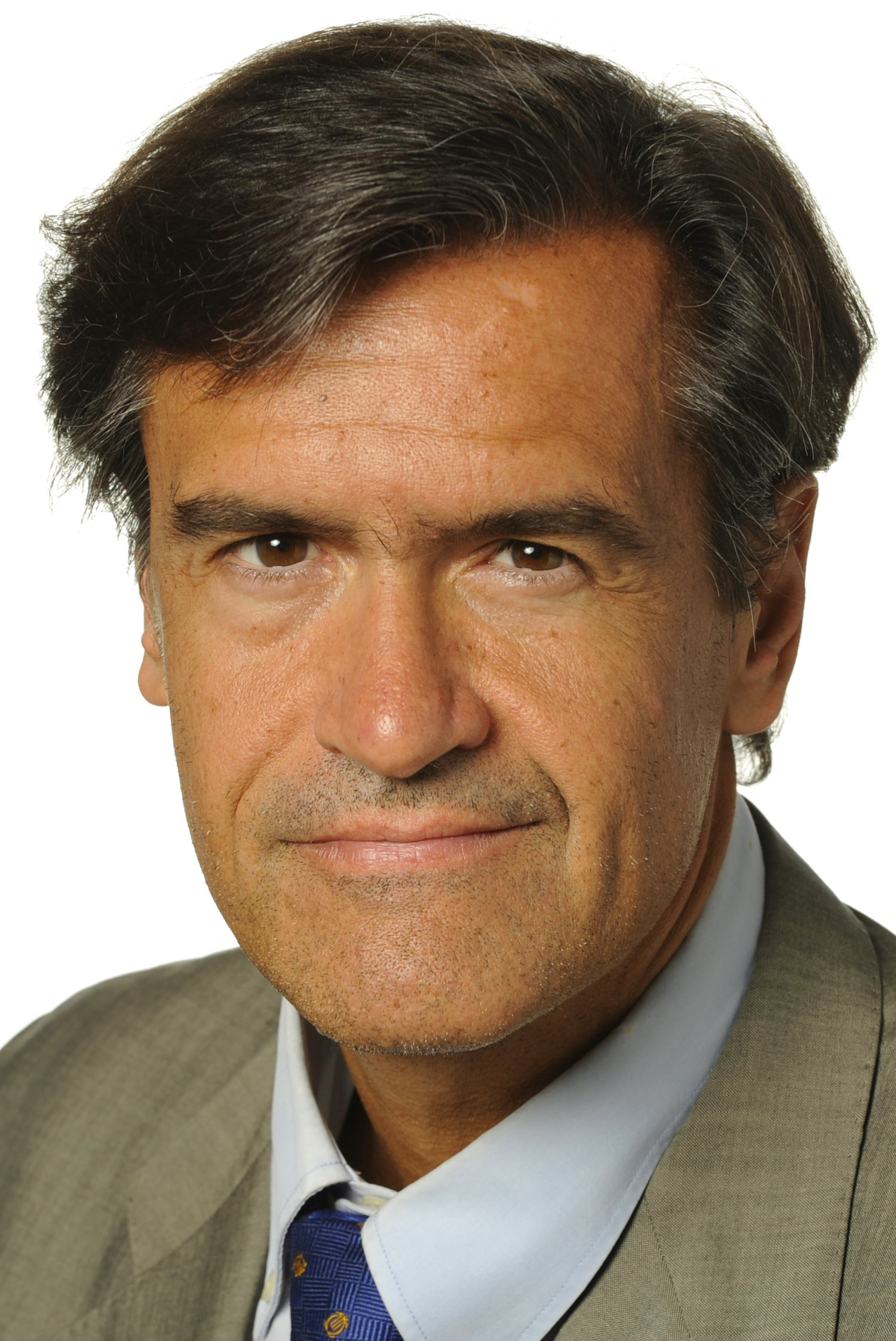

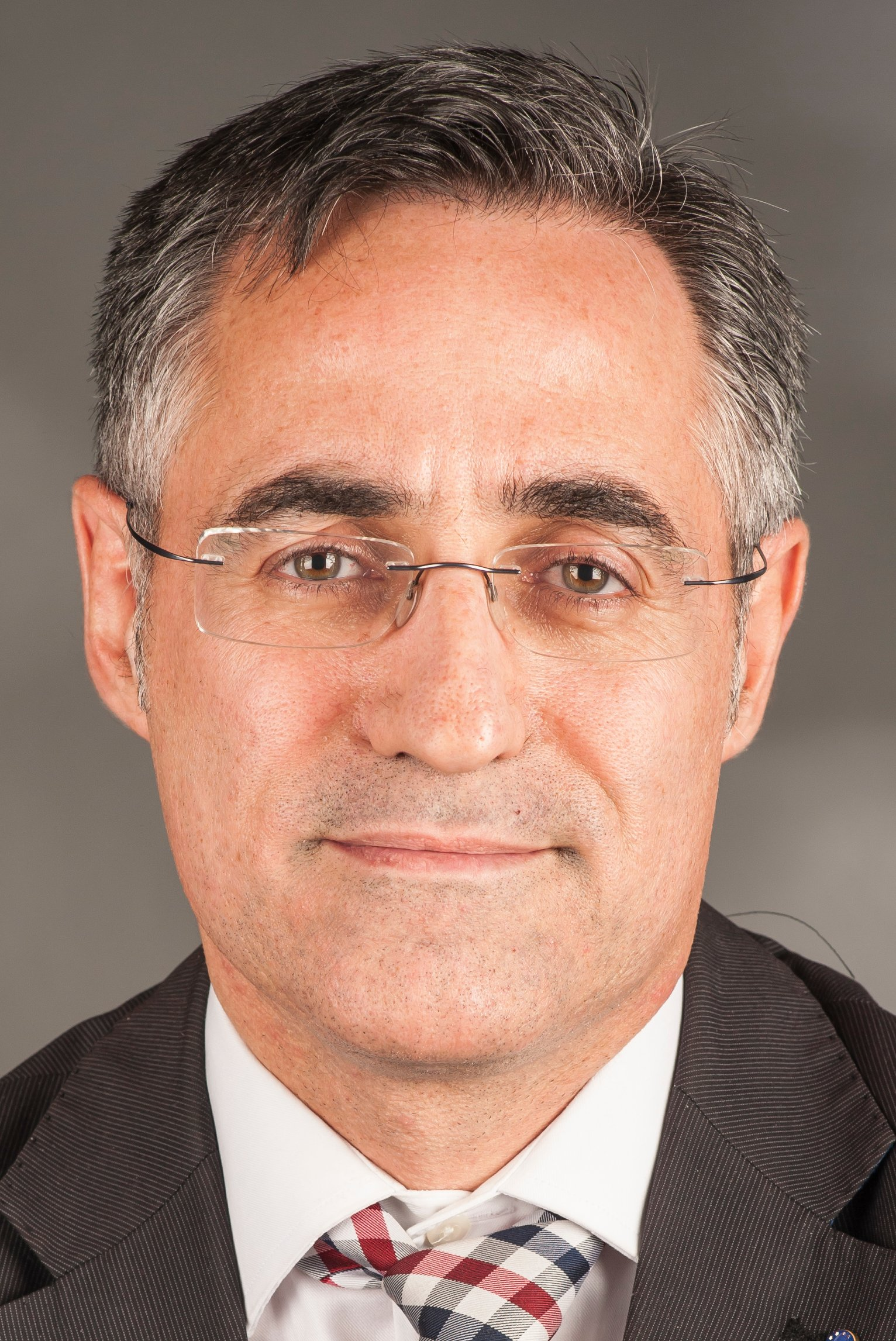

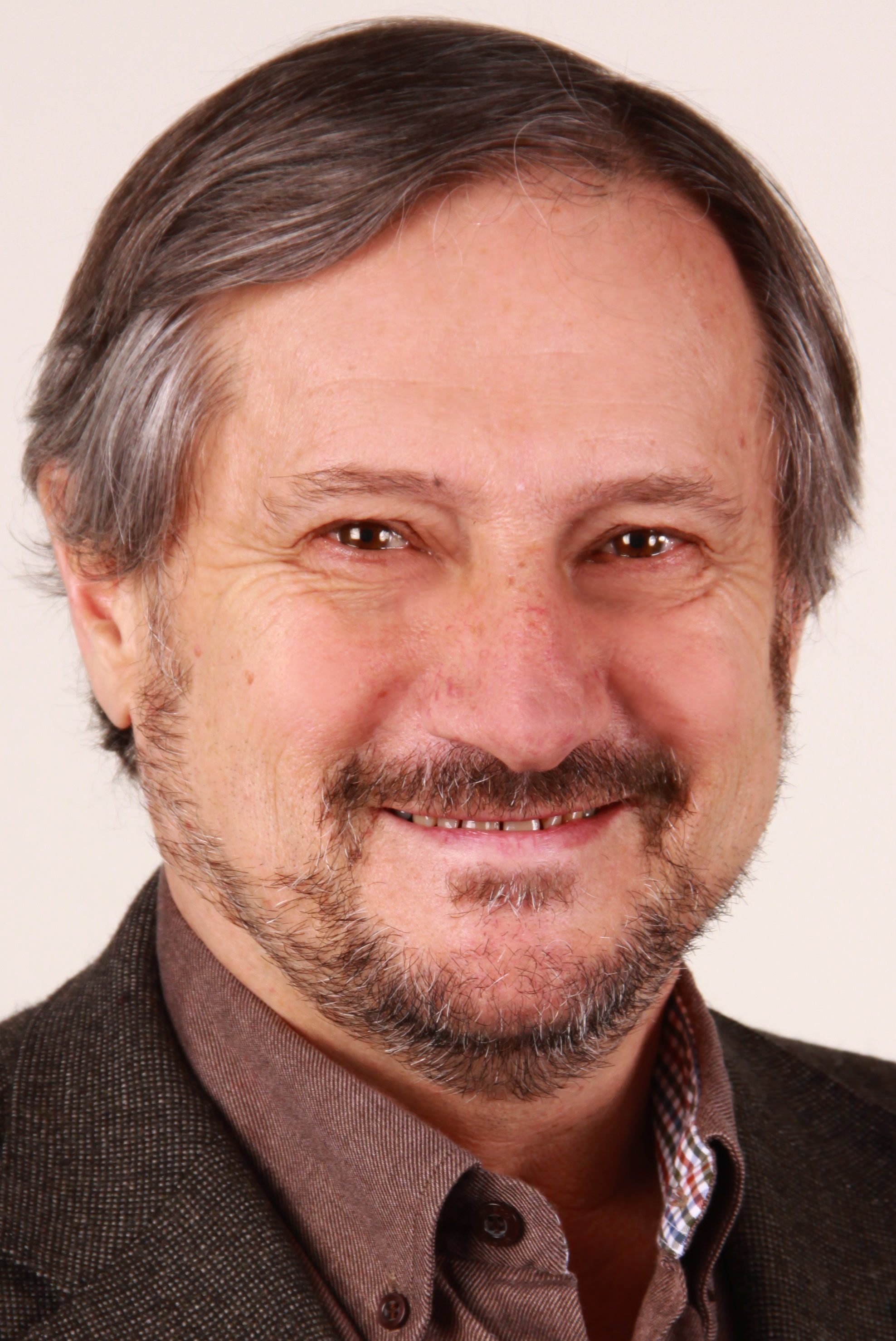

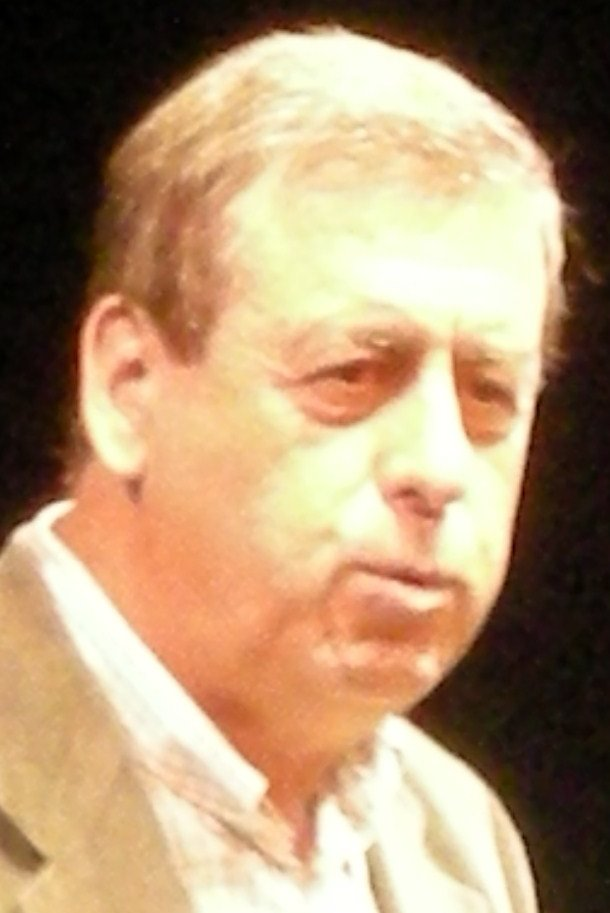

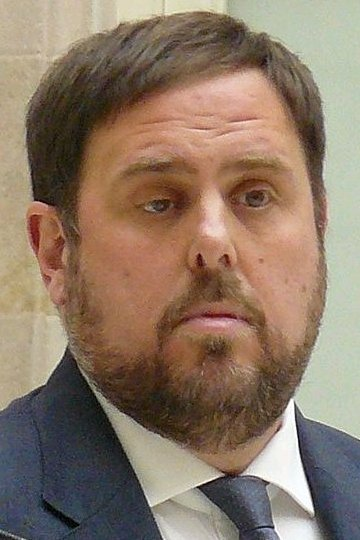
	First party	Second party	Third party
Leader	Jaime Mayor Oreja	Juan Fernando López Aguilar	Ramon Tremosa
Party	PP	PSOE	CEU
Alliance	EPP	PES	ALDE; EPP
Leader since	22 April 2004	22 November 2008	24 January 2009
Leader's seat	Spain	Spain	Spain
Last election	24 seats, 41.2%	25 seats, 43.5%	2 seats, 5.2% (Note: Results for Galeusca, not including the Balearic Islands and Galicia (4.2%, 2 seats), and CE in Andalusia, Balearic Islands and the Canary Islands (1.0%, 0 seats) in the 2004 election.)
Seats won	24	23	3
Seat change	0	▼2	▲1
Popular vote	6,670,377	6,141,784	808,246
Percentage	42.1%	38.8%	5.1%
Swing	▲0.9 pp	▼4.7 pp	▼0.1 pp
	Fourth party	Fifth party	Sixth party
Leader	Willy Meyer	Francisco Sosa Wagner	Oriol Junqueras
Party	IU	UPyD	Europe of the Peoples–Greens
Alliance	GUE/NGL; Greens/EFA	NI	Greens/EFA
Leader since	8 May 2004	3 September 2008	21 February 2009
Leader's seat	Spain	Spain	Spain
Last election	2 seats, 4.1%	Did not contest	1 seat, 3.4% (Note: Results for EdP, not including Andalusia and Asturias (2.4%, 1 seat), Galeusca in Galicia (0.9%, 0 seats) and Aralar (0.1%, 0 seats) in the 2004 election.)
Seats won	2	1	1
Seat change	0	▲1	0
Popular vote	588,248	451,866	394,938
Percentage	3.7%	2.9%	2.5%
Swing	▼0.4 pp	New party	▼0.9 pp

An election was held in Spain on 7 June 2009 as part of the concurrent EU-wide election to the 7th European Parliament. All 50 seats allocated to the Spanish constituency as per the Treaty of Nice—54 after the Treaty of Lisbon came into force on 1 December 2011—were up for election.

The election saw the first national victory for the People's Party (PP) since the 2000 Spanish general election, scoring 42.1% of the share in its best showing in a European Parliament election to date, as well as its third best in a national election overall. The ruling Spanish Socialist Workers' Party (PSOE), on the other hand, fell to second place with 38.8% of the votes after a cycle of electoral victories starting in 2004. As in the previous election, the result was close, as both parties came within three percentage points of each other. The Coalition for Europe (CEU), the alliance of regionalist and peripheral nationalist parties that came to succeed the late Galeusca–Peoples of Europe coalition, remained in third place with 5.1% of the votes, whereas United Left (IU)—which ran under The Left banner—saw its worst showing in a nationwide election up to that point, barely surpassing 3.7% of the share. On the other hand, the new Union, Progress and Democracy (UPyD) party had a strong performance by comfortably doubling its result from the 2008 Spanish general election, being the only national party that saw a net gain of votes compared to that electoral contest. The abertzale left-supported Internationalist Initiative–Solidarity among Peoples (II–SP) candidacy, which had been initially banned from running by the Supreme Court of Spain but later allowed by the Constitutional Court on the grounds that there was not enough evidence of its ties to the ETA terrorist group, scored 1.1% of the votes nationwide but failed to secure any parliamentary representation.

As the 2009 election was held under the provisions of the Treaty of Nice, Spain was allocated 50 MEP seats which, come Election Day, were distributed as follows: PP 23, PSOE 21, CEU 2, IU–ICV 2, UPyD 1 and EdP–V 1. After the Treaty of Lisbon came into force on 1 December 2011, Spain's delegation was increased to 54, granting additional seats to the PSOE (two) and to PP and CEU (one each) according to their June 2009 election results.

== Overview ==
=== Electoral system ===
Voting for the European Parliament in Spain was based on universal suffrage, which comprised all Spanish nationals and resident non-national European citizens over 18 years of age with full political rights, provided that they had not been deprived of the right to vote by a final sentence, nor were legally incapacitated.

50 European Parliament seats were allocated to Spain as per the Treaty of Nice. All were elected in a single multi-member constituency—comprising the entire national territory—using the D'Hondt method and closed-list proportional voting, with no electoral threshold. The use of this electoral method resulted in an effective threshold depending on district magnitude and vote distribution.

The law did not provide for by-elections to fill vacant seats; instead, any vacancies arising after the proclamation of candidates and during the legislative term were filled by the next candidates on the party lists or, when required, by designated substitutes.

=== Outgoing delegation ===
The table below shows the composition of the Spanish delegation in the chamber at the time of the election call.

Delegation composition in May 2009
Groups	Parties	MEPs	
Groups	Parties	Seats	Total
Party of European Socialists	PSOE	24	24
European People's Party	PP	23	24
European People's Party	UPN	1	24
Greens–European Free Alliance	ICV	1	3
Greens–European Free Alliance	EA	1	3
Greens–European Free Alliance	LVdE	1	3
Alliance of Liberals and Democrats for Europe	CDC	1	2
Alliance of Liberals and Democrats for Europe	EAJ/PNV	1	2
European United Left–Nordic Green Left	IU	1	1

== Parties and candidates ==
The electoral law allowed for parties and federations registered in the interior ministry, alliances and groupings of electors to present lists of candidates. Parties and federations intending to form an alliance were required to inform the relevant electoral commission within 10 days of the election call. In order to be entitled to run, parties, federations, alliances and groupings of electors needed to secure the signature of at least 15,000 registered electors; this requirement could be lifted and replaced through the signature of at least 50 elected officials—deputies, senators, MEPs or members from the legislative assemblies of autonomous communities or from local city councils. Electors and elected officials were disallowed from signing for more than one list. Amendments in 2007 required a balanced composition of men and women in the electoral lists, so that candidates of either sex made up at least 40 percent of the total composition.

Below is a list of the main parties and alliances which contested the election:

Candidacy	Parties and alliances	Leading candidate	Ideology	Previous result		Ref.
Candidacy	Parties and alliances	Leading candidate	Ideology	Vote %	Seats	Ref.
PSOE	List: Spanish Socialist Workers' Party (PSOE); Socialists' Party of Catalonia (PSC)	Juan Fernando López Aguilar	Social democracy	43.5%	25	
PP	List: People's Party (PP)	Jaime Mayor Oreja	Conservatism; Christian democracy	41.2%	24	
CEU	List: Convergence and Union (CiU); Basque Nationalist Party (EAJ/PNV); Canarian Coalition (CC); Valencian Nationalist Bloc (Bloc); Majorcan Union (UM); Andalusian Party (PA); Menorcan Union (UMe); Democratic Convergence of La Franja (CDF)	Ramon Tremosa	Peripheral nationalism	5.2%	2	
IU–ICV	List: United Left (IU); Initiative for Catalonia Greens–United and Alternative Left (ICV–EUiA); Galician Left Alternative (AGE); Left (I–E); The Greens (LV); Building the Left–Socialist Alternative (CLI–AS); Left Initiative–Awake (EKI–Iratzarri)	Willy Meyer	Socialism; Communism	4.1%	2	
EdP–V	List: Republican Left of Catalonia (ERC); Galician Nationalist Bloc (BNG); Aralar (Aralar); The Greens (LV); Basque Solidarity (EA); Aragonese Union (CHA); Agreement for Majorca (ExM); Party of El Bierzo (PB)	Oriol Junqueras	Peripheral nationalism	3.4%	1	
UPyD	List: Union, Progress and Democracy (UPyD)	Francisco Sosa Wagner	Social liberalism Radical centrism	Did not contest		

== Campaign ==
=== Party slogans ===
Party or alliance	Original slogan	English translation	Ref.
PSOE	« Este partido se juega en Europa »	"This match plays out in Europe"	
PP	« Ahora soluciones. Ahora PP »	"Now, solutions. Now, PP"	
CEU: CiU; EAJ/PNV	CiU: « Ara » EAJ/PNV: « Europara, inoiz baino indar gehiagorekin » / « A Europa, con más fuerza que nunca »	CiU: "Now"; EAJ/PNV: "To Europe, with more strength than ever"	
IU–ICV	« Izquierda Unida, tu voz en Europa »	"United Left, your voice in Europe"	
EdP–V: ERC; BNG; Aralar–EA	ERC: « Pròxima estació, Europa » BNG: « Imos a Europa, ves? » Aralar–EA: « Langileen Europa » / « La Europa de los trabajadores »	ERC: "Next stop, Europe"; BNG: "We are going to Europe, are you coming?" Aralar–EA: "The Europe of workers"	
UPyD	« Una España fuerte en una Europa unida »	"A strong Spain within a united Europe"	

=== Debates ===
2009 European Parliament election debates in Spain
Date	Organizer(s)	Moderator(s)	P Present (Note: Denotes a main invitee attending the event.) S Surrogate (Note: Denotes a main invitee not attending the event, sending a surrogate in their place.) NI Not invited I Invited A Absent invitee						
Date	Organizer(s)	Moderator(s)	PSOE	PP	CEU	IU–ICV	EdP–V	Audience	Refs
25 May	RTVE	Ana Blanco	P L. Aguilar	P M. Oreja	NI	NI	NI	13.9% (2,653,000)	
1 June	Antena 3	Gloria Lomana	P L. Aguilar	P M. Oreja	NI	NI	NI	10.9% (1,864,000)	
3 June	RTVE	Pepa Bueno	S Jáuregui	S De Grandes	P Tremosa	P Meyer	P Junqueras	8.3% (1,461,000)	

== Opinion polls ==
The tables below list opinion polling results in reverse chronological order, showing the most recent first and using the dates when the survey fieldwork was done, as opposed to the date of publication. Where the fieldwork dates are unknown, the date of publication is given instead. The highest percentage figure in each polling survey is displayed with its background shaded in the leading party's colour. If a tie ensues, this is applied to the figures with the highest percentages. The "Lead" column on the right shows the percentage-point difference between the parties with the highest percentages in a poll.

=== Voting intention estimates ===
The table below lists weighted voting intention estimates. Refusals are generally excluded from the party vote percentages, while question wording and the treatment of "don't know" responses and those not intending to vote may vary between polling organisations. When available, seat projections determined by the polling organisations are displayed below (or in place of) the percentages in a smaller font.

Polling firm/Commissioner	Fieldwork date	Sample size	Turnout	PSOE	PP	CEU	IU	EdPV	UPyD	II–SP	Lead
2009 EP election	7 Jun 2009	—N/a	44.9	38.8; 21	42.1; 23	5.1; 2	3.7; 2	2.5; 1	2.9; 1	1.1; 0	3.3
PSOE	5 Jun 2009	?	45–50	42.4; 23	42.7; 23	–	3.6; 1	–	–	–	0.3
TNS Demoscopia/Antena 3 (Note: "El PP aventaja a los socialistas en las elecciones europeas". Antena 3 (in Spanish). 28 May 2009.)	28 May 2009	?	?	39.7; 21/22	42.4; 22/23	4.8; 2	3.9; 2	2.4; 1	3.1; 1	0.8; 0	2.7
Metroscopia/El País	27–28 May 2009	1,000	45	39.3; 21	43.0; 22	5.0; 2	4.1; 2	3.9; 2	3.0; 1	–	3.7
NC Report/La Razón	26–28 May 2009	1,000	?	40.2; 21	43.2; 23	4.7; 2	3.9; 2	2.3; 1	3.0; 1	–	3.0
Sigma Dos/El Mundo	26–28 May 2009	1,000	39–44	40.6; 21/22	42.8; 23/24	4.0; 2	3.4; 1	2.7; 1	2.6; 1	–	2.2
DYM/ABC	25–28 May 2009	1,040	?	38.7; 21	40.9; 23	5.4; 2	3.3; 1	1.8; 1	2.2; 1	–	2.2
Noxa/La Vanguardia	25–28 May 2009	1,000	?	42.5; 23	40.9; 22	4.9; 2	3.2; 1	2.2; 1	3.3; 1	–	1.6
Obradoiro de Socioloxía/Público	11–27 May 2009	2,402	?	40.0; 21	42.6; 23	3.8; 2	4.0; 2	2.7; 1	2.8; 1	0.9; 0	2.6
PSOE	25 May 2009	2,500	45–48	42.7; 23	42.5; 23	–	? 1/2	–	? 0	–	0.2
NC Report/La Razón	18–21 May 2009	1,000	40.1	41.0; 21/22	43.7; 23	4.5; 2	3.7; 1/2	2.0; 1	2.9; 1	–	2.7
CIS	29 Apr–17 May 2009	4,692	?	42.8; 23	42.2; 23	5.1; 2	3.1; 1	3.6; 1	1.3; 0	–	0.6
GESOP/El Periódico	11–15 May 2009	1,500	?	39.0; 21	43.0; 23	4.2; 2	4.7; 2	3.6; 1	2.6; 1	–	4.0
INVESOP/COPE	8 May 2009	1,700	58	40.7; 22	44.0; 23	? 2	? 1	? 1	? 1	–	3.3
INVESOP/COPE	8 May 2009	1,700	40	41.1; 22	45.1; 24	? 2	? 1	? 0	? 1	–	4.0
NC Report/La Razón	4–8 May 2009	1,000	42.9	40.0; 21	42.8; 22/23	4.6; 2	5.1; 2	2.2; 1	3.4; 1/2	–	2.8
Obradoiro de Socioloxía/Público	14 Apr–8 May 2009	?	?	40.0; 21/22	44.0; 23/24	4.0; 2	3.5; 1	1.7; 0	3.7; 1/2	–	4.0
NC Report/La Razón	20 Apr 2009	?	42.5	39.0; 21	43.3; 23	4.8; 2	5.3; 2	2.2; 1	3.2; 1	–	4.3
Sigma Dos/El Mundo	3–8 Apr 2009	900	?	37.9; 20/21	42.3; 22/23	4.3; 2	5.0; 2	2.2; 1	4.4; 2	–	4.4
Obradoiro de Socioloxía/Público	10 Mar–2 Apr 2009	3,204	?	39.0; 21	43.5; 23	4.8; 2	4.9; 2	1.9; 1	3.2; 1	–	4.5
2004 EP election	13 Jun 2004	—N/a	45.1	43.5; 25	41.2; 24	5.1; 2	4.1; 2	2.5; 1	–	–	2.3

=== Voting preferences ===
The table below lists raw, unweighted voting preferences.

Polling firm/Commissioner	Fieldwork date	Sample size	PSOE	PP	CEU	IU	EdPV	UPyD	Question	X mark	Lead
2009 EP election (Note: Does not include non-resident citizens.)	7 Jun 2009	—N/a	17.6	19.3	2.3	1.7	1.1	1.3	—N/a	54.0	1.7
Obradoiro de Socioloxía/Público	25–27 May 2009	?	21.8	18.8	–	–	–	–	–	–	3.0
Obradoiro de Socioloxía/Público	18–20 May 2009	?	21.6	18.9	–	–	–	–	–	–	2.7
CIS	29 Apr–17 May 2009	4,692	30.7	23.7	2.6	2.1	1.6	0.9	22.3	13.8	7.0
Obradoiro de Socioloxía/Público	11–13 May 2009	?	20.3	20.5	–	–	–	–	–	–	0.2
Obradoiro de Socioloxía/Público	14 Apr–8 May 2009	?	21.4	19.3	1.6	1.9	0.5	2.0	36.6	15.7	2.1
Obradoiro de Socioloxía/Público	10 Mar–2 Apr 2009	3,204	21.6	20.6	2.3	2.7	0.8	1.7	33.3	16.3	1.0
2004 EP election	13 Jun 2004	—N/a	19.7	18.8	2.4	1.9	1.1	–	—N/a	54.1	0.9

=== Victory preferences ===
The table below lists opinion polling on the victory preferences for each party in the event of a European Parliament election taking place.

Polling firm/Commissioner	Fieldwork date	Sample size	PSOE	PP	CEU	IU	EdPV	UPyD	Other/ None	Question	Lead
Metroscopia/El País	27–28 May 2009	1,000	45.0	32.0	–	–	–	–	23.0		13.0
Noxa/La Vanguardia	25–28 May 2009	1,000	42.0	33.0	–	–	–	–	25.0		9.0
PSOE	25 May 2009	2,500	34.8	34.7	–	–	–	–	30.5		0.1
CIS	29 Apr–17 May 2009	4,692	37.8	27.4	2.7	2.5	1.7	1.0	8.4	18.5	10.4

=== Victory likelihood ===
The table below lists opinion polling on the perceived likelihood of victory for each party in the event of a European Parliament election taking place.

Polling firm/Commissioner	Fieldwork date	Sample size	PSOE	PP	Other/ None	Question	Lead
Metroscopia/El País	27–28 May 2009	1,000	35.0	36.0	29.0		1.0
Noxa/La Vanguardia	25–28 May 2009	1,000	39.0	38.0	23.0		1.0
PSOE	25 May 2009	2,500	33.5	33.3	33.2		0.2
CIS	29 Apr–17 May 2009	4,692	30.9	31.5	2.2	35.4	0.6
Obradoiro de Socioloxía/Público	14 Apr–8 May 2009	?	18.3	29.5	0.1	52.4	11.2
Obradoiro de Socioloxía/Público	10 Mar–2 Apr 2009	3,204	21.3	22.0	0.3	56.4	0.7

== Results ==
=== Overall ===
← Summary of the 7 June 2009 European Parliament election results in Spain →
Parties and alliances	Popular vote			Seats	
Parties and alliances	Votes	%	±pp	Total	+/−
People's Party (PP)^{1}	6,670,377	42.12	+0.91	24	±0
Spanish Socialist Workers' Party (PSOE)^{1}	6,141,784	38.78	−4.68	23	−2
Coalition for Europe (CEU)^{1} ^{2}	808,246	5.10	−0.12	3	+1
United Left–Initiative for Catalonia Greens: The Left (IU–ICV)	588,248	3.71	−0.44	2	±0
Union, Progress and Democracy (UPyD)	451,866	2.85	New	1	+1
Europe of the Peoples–Greens (EdP–V)^{3}	394,938	2.49	−0.95	1	±0
Internationalist Initiative–Solidarity among Peoples (II–SP)	178,121	1.12	New	0	±0
The Greens–European Green Group (LV–GVE)	89,147	0.56	+0.12	0	±0
Anti-Bullfighting Party Against Mistreatment of Animals (PACMA)	41,913	0.26	New	0	±0
For a Fairer World (PUM+J)	24,507	0.15	+0.09	0	±0
Libertas–Citizens of Spain (Libertas)	22,903	0.14	New	0	±0
Anti-capitalist Left–Global Revolt (IzAn–RG)	19,735	0.12	New	0	±0
Spanish Alternative (AES)	19,583	0.12	New	0	±0
Communist Party of the Peoples of Spain (PCPE)	15,221	0.10	+0.07	0	±0
Socialist Party of Andalusia (PSA)^{4}	13,993	0.09	+0.05	0	±0
Internationalist Socialist Workers' Party (POSI)	12,344	0.08	+0.03	0	±0
Family and Life Party (PFyV)	10,456	0.07	+0.02	0	±0
Democratic and Social Centre (CDS)	10,144	0.06	−0.02	0	±0
Spanish Phalanx of the CNSO (FE de las JONS)	10,031	0.06	+0.03	0	±0
National Democracy (DN)	9,950	0.06	+0.02	0	±0
Feminist Initiative (IFem)	9,721	0.06	New	0	±0
National Front (FrN)	7,970	0.05	New	0	±0
Catalan Republican Party (RC)	7,547	0.05	New	0	±0
Humanist Party (PH)	7,009	0.04	+0.01	0	±0
Valencian Union (UV)^{5}	6,072	0.04	−0.01	0	±0
Republican Social Movement (MSR)	6,009	0.04	New	0	±0
Internationalist Solidarity and Self-Management (SAIn)	5,877	0.04	New	0	±0
Liberal Democratic Centre (CDL)	5,733	0.04	New	0	±0
Authentic Phalanx (FA)	5,165	0.03	+0.02	0	±0
United Extremadura (EU)^{6}	5,007	0.03	+0.02	0	±0
Regionalist Party of the Leonese Country (PREPAL)	4,767	0.03	+0.01	0	±0
Communist Unification of Spain (UCE)	3,483	0.02	New	0	±0
Asturian Nationalist Unity (UNA)	3,183	0.02	New	0	±0
Andecha Astur (AA)	2,255	0.01	New	0	±0
Liberal Centrist Union (UCL)	1,991	0.01	±0.00	0	±0
Blank ballots	220,471	1.39	+0.78		
Total^{1}	15,835,767			54	±0
Valid votes	15,835,767	99.38	+0.36		
Invalid votes	99,380	0.62	−0.36		
Votes cast / turnout	15,935,147	44.90	−0.24		
Abstentions	19,557,420	55.10	+0.24		
Registered voters	35,492,567				
Sources
Footnotes: ^{1} Initially, Spain was allocated 50 seats, which were distributed as follows: PP (23), PSOE (21), CEU (2), IU–ICV (2), UPyD (1) and EdP–V (1). However, as a result of the Treaty of Lisbon, Spain's MEP delegation grew to 54, with the additional 4 seats being allocated to PP (1), PSOE (2) and CEU (1).; ^{2} Coalition for Europe results are compared to the combined totals of Galeusca–Peoples of Europe—not including results in the Balearic Islands and Galicia—and European Coalition in Andalusia, Balearic Islands and the Canary Islands in the 2004 election.; ^{3} Europe of the Peoples–Greens results are compared to the combined totals of Europe of the Peoples—not including results in Andalusia and Asturias—, Galeusca–Peoples of Europe in Galicia and Aralar in the 2004 election.; ^{4} Socialist Party of Andalusia results are compared to Europe of the Peoples totals in Andalusia in the 2004 election.; ^{5} Valencian Union results are compared to European Coalition totals in the Valencian Community in the 2004 election.; ^{6} United Extremadura results are compared to European Coalition totals in Extremadura in the 2004 election.

Popular vote
PP	42.12%
PSOE	38.78%
CEU	5.10%
IU–ICV	3.71%
UPyD	2.85%
EdP–V	2.49%
II–SP	1.12%
Others	2.41%
Blank ballots	1.39%

Seats
PP	44.44%
PSOE	42.59%
CEU	5.56%
IU–ICV	3.70%
UPyD	1.85%
EdP–V	1.85%

=== Maps ===
Vote winner strength by province.

Vote winner strength by autonomous community.

=== Distribution by European group ===
Summary of political group distribution in the 7th European Parliament (2009–2014)
Groups	Parties	Seats	Total	%
European People's Party (EPP)	People's Party (PP); Democratic Union of Catalonia (UDC)	24; 1	25	46.30
Party of European Socialists (PES)	Spanish Socialist Workers' Party (PSOE)	23	23	42.59
Greens–European Free Alliance (Greens/EFA)	Initiative for Catalonia Greens (ICV); Republican Left of Catalonia (ERC)	1; 1	2	3.70
Alliance of Liberals and Democrats for Europe (ALDE)	Democratic Convergence of Catalonia (CDC); Basque Nationalist Party (EAJ/PNV)	1; 1	2	3.70
European United Left–Nordic Green Left (GUE/NGL)	United Left (IU)	1	1	1.85
Non-Inscrits (NI)	Union, Progress and Democracy (UPyD)	1	1	1.85
Total		54	54	100.00

== Bibliography ==
- Ley Orgánica 5/1985, de 19 de junio, del Régimen Electoral General (Organic Law 5/1985). Official State Gazette (in Spanish). 19 June 1985 [version as of 22 January 2009]. BOE-A-1985-11672.
- Treaty of Nice amending the Treaty on European Union, the Treaties establishing the European Communities and certain related acts (2001/C 80/01). Official Journal of the European Communities. 10 March 2001. 12001C/TXT.
- Treaty of Lisbon amending the Treaty on European Union and the Treaty establishing the European Community (2007/C 306/01). Official Journal of the European Union. 17 December 2007. 12007L/TXT.
- European Council Decision (EU) establishing the composition of the European Parliament (European Council Decision (EU) 2013/312). Official Journal of the European Union. 28 June 2013. 32013D0312.
