= Results of the 2004 European Parliament election in Spain =

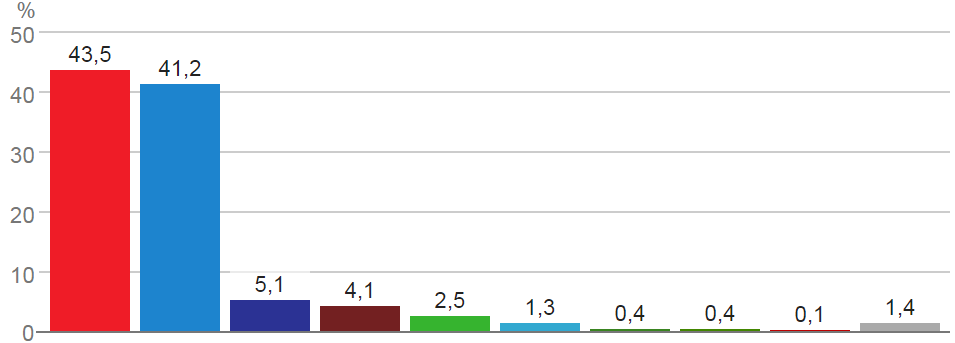
(Spain)	Main: 2004 European Parliament election in Spain
← 1999 13 June 2004 2009 →
Party		Votes	%	Seats
	PSOE	6,741,112	43.5%	25
	PP	6,393,192	41.2%	24
	Galeusca	798,816	5.1%	2
	IU–ICV–EUiA	643,136	4.1%	2
	EdP	380,709	2.5%	1
	CE	197,231	1.3%	0
	LV–GVE	68,536	0.4%	0
	PCLyN	54,460	0.4%	0
	Aralar	19,993	0.1%	0
	Others	215,097	1.4%	0
Total		15,512,282	100.0%	54

This article presents the results breakdown of the election to the European Parliament held in Spain on 13 June 2004. The following tables show detailed results in each of the country's 17 autonomous communities and in the autonomous cities of Ceuta and Melilla.

== Nationwide ==
← Summary of the 13 June 2004 European Parliament election results in Spain →
Parties and alliances	Popular vote			Seats	
Parties and alliances	Votes	%	±pp	Total	+/−
Spanish Socialist Workers' Party (PSOE)	6,741,112	43.46	+8.13	25	+1
People's Party (PP)	6,393,192	41.21	+1.47	24	−3
Galeusca–Peoples of Europe (Galeusca)^{1}	798,816	5.15	−2.87	2	−2
United Left–Initiative for Catalonia Greens–EUiA (IU–ICV–EUiA)^{2}	643,136	4.15	−2.36	2	−2
Europe of the Peoples (EdP)^{3}	380,709	2.45	+1.34	1	−1
European Coalition (CE)^{4}	197,231	1.27	−2.17	0	−2
The Greens–European Green Group (LV–GVE)^{5}	68,536	0.44	−0.22	0	±0
Cannabis Party for Legalisation and Normalisation (PCLyN)	54,460	0.35	New	0	±0
Aralar (Aralar)	19,993	0.13	New	0	±0
Socialist Action Party (PASOC)	13,810	0.09	New	0	±0
Democratic and Social Centre (CDS)	11,820	0.08	−0.10	0	±0
For a Fairer World (PUM+J)	9,202	0.06	New	0	±0
Popular Unity Candidacy (CUP)	8,180	0.05	New	0	±0
Internationalist Socialist Workers' Party (POSI)^{6}	7,976	0.05	+0.02	0	±0
Family and Life Party (PFyV)	7,958	0.05	New	0	±0
New Green Left (NIV)	6,876	0.04	New	0	±0
National Democracy (DN)	6,314	0.04	±0.00	0	±0
The Phalanx (FE)	5,935	0.04	−0.01	0	±0
The Unemployed (Los Parados)	5,314	0.03	New	0	±0
Commoners' Land–Castilian Nationalist Party (TC–PNC)	5,267	0.03	−0.03	0	±0
Spanish Phalanx of the CNSO (FE de las JONS)	4,484	0.03	New	0	±0
Communist Party of the Peoples of Spain–Internationalist Struggle (PCPE–LI)	4,281	0.03	−0.09	0	±0
Humanist Party (PH)	3,923	0.03	−0.03	0	±0
Spanish Democratic Party (PADE)	3,454	0.02	−0.06	0	±0
Regionalist Party of the Leonese Country (PREPAL)	3,308	0.02	−0.01	0	±0
Catalan State (EC)	2,594	0.02	New	0	±0
We–People's Unity (Nós–UP)	2,516	0.02	New	0	±0
Authentic Phalanx (FA)	2,008	0.01	New	0	±0
Liberal Coalition (CL)	1,719	0.01	New	0	±0
Carlist Party (PC)	1,600	0.01	New	0	±0
Liberal Centrist Union (UCL)	1,544	0.01	New	0	±0
Basque Citizens (EH)	n/a	n/a	−1.45	0	−1
Blank ballots	95,014	0.61	−1.08		
Total	15,512,282			54	−10
Valid votes	15,512,282	99.02	−0.19		
Invalid votes	154,209	0.98	+0.19		
Votes cast / turnout	15,666,491	45.14	−17.91		
Abstentions	19,039,553	54.86	+17.91		
Registered voters	34,706,044				
Sources
Footnotes: ^{1} Galeusca–Peoples of Europe results are compared to the combined totals of Convergence and Union, Nationalist Coalition–Europe of the Peoples in the Basque Country and Navarre and Galician Nationalist Bloc in the 1999 election.; ^{2} United Left–Initiative for Catalonia Greens–EUiA results are compared to the combined totals of United Left–United and Alternative Left and The Greens–Left of the Peoples in Catalonia in the 1999 election.; ^{3} Europe of the Peoples results are compared to the combined totals of Nationalist Coalition–Europe of the Peoples—not including results in the Balearic Islands, the Basque Country and Navarre—, The Greens–Left of the Peoples in Aragon and Andecha Astur in the 1999 election.; ^{4} European Coalition (2004) results are compared to the combined totals of European Coalition (1999), Nationalist Coalition–Europe of the Peoples in the Balearic Islands, United Extremadura and Asturianist Party in the 1999 election.; ^{5} The Greens–European Green Group results are compared to The Greens–Green Group totals in the 1999 election.; ^{6} Internationalist Socialist Workers' Party results are compared to Coalition for the Repeal of the Maastricht Treaty totals in the 1999 election.

== Autonomous communities ==
=== Andalusia ===
← Summary of the 13 June 2004 European Parliament election results in Andalusia →
Parties and alliances	Popular vote		
Parties and alliances	Votes	%	±pp
Spanish Socialist Workers' Party (PSOE)	1,349,475	54.38	+11.09
People's Party (PP)	896,401	36.12	+0.12
United Left/The Greens–Assembly for Andalusia (IULV–CA)	125,303	5.05	−5.65
Andalusian Party (European Coalition) (PA)	63,783	2.57	−4.07
Left Assembly–Socialist Party of Andalusia (EdP) (A–IZ–PSA)	6,536	0.26	New
The Greens–European Green Group (LV–GVE)^{1}	6,183	0.25	−0.21
Cannabis Party for Legalisation and Normalisation (PCLyN)	6,094	0.25	New
Socialist Action Party (PASOC)	2,531	0.10	New
New Green Left (NIV)	1,966	0.08	New
For a Fairer World (PUM+J)	1,359	0.05	New
Internationalist Socialist Workers' Party (POSI)^{2}	1,094	0.04	+0.02
The Phalanx (FE)	894	0.04	±0.00
The Unemployed (Los Parados)	809	0.03	New
Family and Life Party (PFyV)	749	0.03	New
Galeusca–Peoples of Europe (Galeusca)^{3}	705	0.03	−0.03
Democratic and Social Centre (CDS)	684	0.03	−0.07
Spanish Phalanx of the CNSO (FE de las JONS)	576	0.02	New
Spanish Democratic Party (PADE)	568	0.02	−0.01
Communist Party of the Peoples of Spain–Internationalist Struggle (PCPE–LI)	518	0.02	−0.10
Humanist Party (PH)	506	0.02	−0.02
National Democracy (DN)	477	0.02	−0.01
Regionalist Party of the Leonese Country (PREPAL)	325	0.01	−0.01
Aralar (Aralar)	273	0.01	New
Authentic Phalanx (FA)	271	0.01	New
Liberal Centrist Union (UCL)	265	0.01	New
Popular Unity Candidacy (CUP)	259	0.01	New
Liberal Coalition (CL)	219	0.01	New
Commoners' Land–Castilian Nationalist Party (TC–PNC)	203	0.01	±0.00
Carlist Party (PC)	178	0.01	New
Catalan State (EC)	163	0.01	New
We–People's Unity (Nós–UP)	133	0.01	New
Blank ballots	12,103	0.49	−0.78
Total	2,481,603		
Valid votes	2,481,603	99.79	+0.63
Invalid votes	5,273	0.21	−0.63
Votes cast / turnout	2,486,876	40.88	−22.74
Abstentions	3,596,856	59.12	+22.74
Registered voters	6,083,732		
Sources
Footnotes: ^{1} The Greens–European Green Group results are compared to The Greens–Green Group totals in the 1999 election.; ^{2} Internationalist Socialist Workers' Party results are compared to Coalition for the Repeal of the Maastricht Treaty totals in the 1999 election.; ^{3} Galeusca–Peoples of Europe results are compared to the combined totals of Convergence and Union and Galician Nationalist Bloc in the 1999 election.

=== Aragon ===
← Summary of the 13 June 2004 European Parliament election results in Aragon →
Parties and alliances	Popular vote		
Parties and alliances	Votes	%	±pp
Spanish Socialist Workers' Party (PSOE)	220,719	45.84	+12.16
People's Party (PP)	192,406	39.96	−2.52
Aragonese Union (Europe of the Peoples) (CHA)	29,520	6.13	−0.72
United Left–The Greens (IU–LV)	14,740	3.06	−0.90
Aragonese Party (European Coalition) (PAR)	14,157	2.94	−6.33
Cannabis Party for Legalisation and Normalisation (PCLyN)	1,803	0.37	New
The Greens–European Green Group (LV–GVE)^{1}	1,276	0.26	−0.23
Family and Life Party (PFyV)	346	0.07	New
Galeusca–Peoples of Europe (Galeusca)^{2}	278	0.06	−0.04
Internationalist Socialist Workers' Party (POSI)^{3}	273	0.06	+0.04
National Democracy (DN)	256	0.05	±0.00
Socialist Action Party (PASOC)	252	0.05	New
For a Fairer World (PUM+J)	210	0.04	New
Democratic and Social Centre (CDS)	199	0.04	−0.07
Spanish Phalanx of the CNSO (FE de las JONS)	151	0.03	New
The Unemployed (Los Parados)	127	0.03	New
New Green Left (NIV)	123	0.03	New
The Phalanx (FE)	116	0.02	−0.03
Spanish Democratic Party (PADE)	86	0.02	−0.01
Humanist Party (PH)	77	0.02	−0.03
Communist Party of the Peoples of Spain–Internationalist Struggle (PCPE–LI)	69	0.01	−0.06
Authentic Phalanx (FA)	65	0.01	New
Liberal Coalition (CL)	62	0.01	New
Aralar (Aralar)	59	0.01	New
Catalan State (EC)	57	0.01	New
Carlist Party (PC)	51	0.01	New
Commoners' Land–Castilian Nationalist Party (TC–PNC)	48	0.01	−0.01
Regionalist Party of the Leonese Country (PREPAL)	47	0.01	−0.01
We–People's Unity (Nós–UP)	35	0.01	New
Popular Unity Candidacy (CUP)	34	0.01	New
Liberal Centrist Union (UCL)	25	0.01	New
Blank ballots	3,852	0.80	−1.27
Total	481,519		
Valid votes	481,519	99.70	+0.48
Invalid votes	1,472	0.30	−0.48
Votes cast / turnout	482,991	47.34	−16.93
Abstentions	537,205	52.66	+16.93
Registered voters	1,020,196		
Sources
Footnotes: ^{1} The Greens–European Green Group results are compared to The Greens–Green Group totals in the 1999 election.; ^{2} Galeusca–Peoples of Europe results are compared to the combined totals of Convergence and Union and Galician Nationalist Bloc in the 1999 election.; ^{3} Internationalist Socialist Workers' Party results are compared to Coalition for the Repeal of the Maastricht Treaty totals in the 1999 election.

=== Asturias ===
← Summary of the 13 June 2004 European Parliament election results in Asturias →
Parties and alliances	Popular vote		
Parties and alliances	Votes	%	±pp
Spanish Socialist Workers' Party (PSOE)	204,889	46.39	+4.87
People's Party (PP)	195,972	44.37	+4.94
United Left–Bloc for Asturias (IU–BA)	27,834	6.30	−4.05
The Greens–European Green Group (LV–GVE)^{1}	2,108	0.48	+0.02
Asturianist Party (European Coalition) (PAS)	2,098	0.48	−1.25
Europe of the Peoples (EdP)^{2}	1,677	0.38	+0.36
Cannabis Party for Legalisation and Normalisation (PCLyN)	1,198	0.27	New
For a Fairer World (PUM+J)	266	0.06	New
Socialist Action Party (PASOC)	266	0.06	New
Galeusca–Peoples of Europe (Galeusca)^{3}	257	0.06	−0.04
Internationalist Socialist Workers' Party (POSI)^{4}	249	0.06	+0.05
Democratic and Social Centre (CDS)	210	0.05	−0.06
New Green Left (NIV)	209	0.05	New
Communist Party of the Peoples of Spain–Internationalist Struggle (PCPE–LI)	185	0.04	−0.09
The Unemployed (Los Parados)	142	0.03	New
Spanish Phalanx of the CNSO (FE de las JONS)	98	0.02	New
National Democracy (DN)	94	0.02	−0.01
Humanist Party (PH)	84	0.02	−0.01
Spanish Democratic Party (PADE)	82	0.02	+0.01
Family and Life Party (PFyV)	80	0.02	New
The Phalanx (FE)	70	0.02	−0.02
Authentic Phalanx (FA)	60	0.01	New
Regionalist Party of the Leonese Country (PREPAL)	49	0.01	±0.00
Liberal Coalition (CL)	42	0.01	New
Aralar (Aralar)	39	0.01	New
Liberal Centrist Union (UCL)	29	0.01	New
Commoners' Land–Castilian Nationalist Party (TC–PNC)	25	0.01	±0.00
Popular Unity Candidacy (CUP)	24	0.01	New
We–People's Unity (Nós–UP)	23	0.01	New
Catalan State (EC)	22	0.00	New
Carlist Party (PC)	22	0.00	New
Blank ballots	3,244	0.73	−0.99
Total	441,647		
Valid votes	441,647	99.75	+0.28
Invalid votes	1,124	0.25	−0.28
Votes cast / turnout	442,771	44.90	−18.45
Abstentions	543,447	55.10	+18.45
Registered voters	986,218		
Sources
Footnotes: ^{1} The Greens–European Green Group results are compared to The Greens–Green Group totals in the 1999 election.; ^{2} Europe of the Peoples results are compared to Nationalist Coalition–Europe of the Peoples totals in the 1999 election.; ^{3} Galeusca–Peoples of Europe results are compared to the combined totals of Convergence and Union and Galician Nationalist Bloc in the 1999 election.; ^{4} Internationalist Socialist Workers' Party results are compared to Coalition for the Repeal of the Maastricht Treaty totals in the 1999 election.

=== Balearic Islands ===
← Summary of the 13 June 2004 European Parliament election results in the Balearic Islands →
Parties and alliances	Popular vote		
Parties and alliances	Votes	%	±pp
People's Party (PP)	121,587	46.57	−0.53
Spanish Socialist Workers' Party (PSOE)	101,212	38.76	+11.06
PSM–Nationalist Agreement (Peoples of Europe) (PSM–EN)	9,394	3.60	−5.62
Majorcan Union (European Coalition) (UM)	8,120	3.11	−2.47
Republican Left of Catalonia (Europe of the Peoples) (ERC)	7,498	2.87	New
United Left of the Balearic Islands (EUIB)	6,167	2.36	−1.39
The Greens–European Green Group (LV–GVE)^{1}	2,340	0.90	−0.33
Cannabis Party for Legalisation and Normalisation (PCLyN)	1,183	0.45	New
Internationalist Socialist Workers' Party (POSI)^{2}	225	0.09	+0.05
Socialist Action Party (PASOC)	186	0.07	New
Democratic and Social Centre (CDS)	185	0.07	−0.04
For a Fairer World (PUM+J)	131	0.05	New
National Democracy (DN)	125	0.05	−0.06
New Green Left (NIV)	115	0.04	New
Spanish Phalanx of the CNSO (FE de las JONS)	115	0.04	New
Popular Unity Candidacy (CUP)	103	0.04	New
The Unemployed (Los Parados)	83	0.03	New
Family and Life Party (PFyV)	79	0.03	New
Aralar (Aralar)	68	0.03	New
Spanish Democratic Party (PADE)	65	0.02	−0.01
Humanist Party (PH)	64	0.02	−0.02
Communist Party of the Peoples of Spain–Internationalist Struggle (PCPE–LI)	48	0.02	−0.08
Catalan State (EC)	48	0.02	New
Authentic Phalanx (FA)	46	0.02	New
The Phalanx (FE)	45	0.02	−0.03
Liberal Coalition (CL)	38	0.01	New
Regionalist Party of the Leonese Country (PREPAL)	33	0.01	−0.02
Commoners' Land–Castilian Nationalist Party (TC–PNC)	29	0.01	−0.01
Carlist Party (PC)	27	0.01	New
We–People's Unity (Nós–UP)	26	0.01	New
Liberal Centrist Union (UCL)	23	0.01	New
Blank ballots	1,701	0.65	−1.52
Total	261,109		
Valid votes	261,109	99.71	+1.57
Invalid votes	766	0.29	−1.57
Votes cast / turnout	261,875	37.61	−19.38
Abstentions	434,339	62.39	+19.38
Registered voters	696,214		
Sources
Footnotes: ^{1} The Greens–European Green Group results are compared to The Greens–Green Group totals in the 1999 election.; ^{2} Internationalist Socialist Workers' Party results are compared to Coalition for the Repeal of the Maastricht Treaty totals in the 1999 election.

=== Basque Country ===
← Summary of the 13 June 2004 European Parliament election results in the Basque Country →
Parties and alliances	Popular vote		
Parties and alliances	Votes	%	±pp
Basque Nationalist Party (Galeusca–Peoples of Europe) (EAJ/PNV)^{1}	249,143	35.28	n/a
Socialist Party of the Basque Country–Basque Country Left (PSE–EE (PSOE))	199,341	28.23	+8.69
People's Party (PP)	148,617	21.05	+1.29
Basque Solidarity (Europe of the Peoples) (EA)^{1}	54,825	7.76	n/a
United Left (EB–IU)	29,461	4.17	+0.23
Aralar (Aralar)	8,891	1.26	New
Cannabis Party for Legalisation and Normalisation (PCLyN)	3,001	0.42	New
The Greens–European Green Group (B–GVE)^{2}	2,484	0.35	+0.12
For a Fairer World (PUM+J)	722	0.10	New
New Green Left (NIV)	650	0.09	New
Internationalist Socialist Workers' Party (POSI)^{3}	585	0.08	+0.06
Communist Party of the Peoples of Spain–Internationalist Struggle (PCPE–LI)	517	0.07	±0.00
The Unemployed (Los Parados)	448	0.06	New
Family and Life Party (PFyV)	399	0.06	New
Socialist Action Party (PASOC)	395	0.06	New
Democratic and Social Centre (CDS)	369	0.05	+0.01
European Coalition (CE)^{4}	343	0.05	+0.03
Humanist Party (PH)	273	0.04	−0.02
National Democracy (DN)	194	0.03	+0.01
Commoners' Land–Castilian Nationalist Party (TC–PNC)	176	0.02	±0.00
Carlist Party (PC)	162	0.02	New
We–People's Unity (Nós–UP)	161	0.02	New
Regionalist Party of the Leonese Country (PREPAL)	126	0.02	±0.00
Spanish Democratic Party (PADE)	110	0.02	±0.00
Catalan State (EC)	100	0.01	New
Spanish Phalanx of the CNSO (FE de las JONS)	97	0.01	New
Popular Unity Candidacy (CUP)	95	0.01	New
Liberal Coalition (CL)	95	0.01	New
The Phalanx (FE)	83	0.01	±0.00
Authentic Phalanx (FA)	73	0.01	New
Liberal Centrist Union (UCL)	43	0.01	New
Blank ballots	4,146	0.59	−1.15
Total	706,125		
Valid votes	706,125	87.79	−11.33
Invalid votes	98,250	12.21	+11.33
Votes cast / turnout	804,375	44.59	−19.96
Abstentions	999,606	55.41	+19.96
Registered voters	1,803,981		
Sources
Footnotes: ^{1} Within the Basque Nationalist Party–Basque Solidarity alliance in the 1999 election.; ^{2} The Greens–European Green Group results are compared to The Greens–Green Group totals in the 1999 election.; ^{3} Internationalist Socialist Workers' Party results are compared to Coalition for the Repeal of the Maastricht Treaty totals in the 1999 election.; ^{4} European Coalition (2004) results are compared to European Coalition (1999) totals in the 1999 election.

=== Canary Islands ===
← Summary of the 13 June 2004 European Parliament election results in the Canary Islands →
Parties and alliances	Popular vote		
Parties and alliances	Votes	%	±pp
People's Party (PP)	214,160	39.99	+6.56
Spanish Socialist Workers' Party (PSOE)	206,168	38.50	+13.96
Canarian Coalition (European Coalition) (CC)	90,619	16.92	−16.86
Canarian United Left–Green Alternative (IUC)	9,863	1.84	−1.05
The Greens–European Green Group (LV–GVE)^{1}	4,370	0.82	+0.06
Cannabis Party for Legalisation and Normalisation (PCLyN)	1,679	0.31	New
Europe of the Peoples (EdP)^{2}	741	0.14	+0.04
Socialist Action Party (PASOC)	701	0.13	New
Galeusca–Peoples of Europe (Galeusca)^{3}	637	0.12	−0.03
Democratic and Social Centre (CDS)	391	0.07	−0.37
New Green Left (NIV)	353	0.07	New
Internationalist Socialist Workers' Party (POSI)^{4}	338	0.06	+0.02
Aralar (Aralar)	296	0.06	New
For a Fairer World (PUM+J)	294	0.05	New
The Unemployed (Los Parados)	238	0.04	New
Communist Party of the Peoples of Spain–Internationalist Struggle (PCPE–LI)	229	0.04	−0.08
National Democracy (DN)	207	0.04	+0.01
The Phalanx (FE)	178	0.03	±0.00
Humanist Party (PH)	161	0.03	−0.06
Spanish Democratic Party (PADE)	153	0.03	−0.01
Spanish Phalanx of the CNSO (FE de las JONS)	144	0.03	New
Regionalist Party of the Leonese Country (PREPAL)	141	0.03	±0.00
Family and Life Party (PFyV)	136	0.03	New
Liberal Coalition (CL)	125	0.02	New
Popular Unity Candidacy (CUP)	114	0.02	New
Commoners' Land–Castilian Nationalist Party (TC–PNC)	101	0.02	−0.07
We–People's Unity (Nós–UP)	78	0.01	New
Authentic Phalanx (FA)	76	0.01	New
Carlist Party (PC)	71	0.01	New
Catalan State (EC)	60	0.01	New
Liberal Centrist Union (UCL)	56	0.01	New
Blank ballots	2,672	0.50	−1.01
Total	535,550		
Valid votes	535,550	99.70	+0.72
Invalid votes	1,619	0.30	−0.72
Votes cast / turnout	537,169	36.48	−23.65
Abstentions	935,451	63.52	+23.65
Registered voters	1,472,620		
Sources
Footnotes: ^{1} The Greens–European Green Group results are compared to The Greens–Green Group totals in the 1999 election.; ^{2} Europe of the Peoples results are compared to Nationalist Coalition–Europe of the Peoples totals in the 1999 election.; ^{3} Galeusca–Peoples of Europe results are compared to the combined totals of Convergence and Union and Galician Nationalist Bloc in the 1999 election.; ^{4} Internationalist Socialist Workers' Party results are compared to Coalition for the Repeal of the Maastricht Treaty totals in the 1999 election.

=== Cantabria ===
← Summary of the 13 June 2004 European Parliament election results in Cantabria →
Parties and alliances	Popular vote		
Parties and alliances	Votes	%	±pp
People's Party (PP)	129,811	52.46	−1.91
Spanish Socialist Workers' Party (PSOE)	104,564	42.26	+8.00
United Left (IU)	6,291	2.54	−2.46
The Greens–European Green Group (LV–GVE)^{1}	864	0.35	−0.21
Cannabis Party for Legalisation and Normalisation (PCLyN)	825	0.33	New
Cantabrian Nationalist Council (Europe of the Peoples) (CNC)	555	0.22	New
Galeusca–Peoples of Europe (Galeusca)^{2}	496	0.20	+0.11
Democratic and Social Centre (CDS)	227	0.09	−0.22
European Coalition (CE)^{3}	209	0.08	+0.05
Socialist Action Party (PASOC)	187	0.08	New
Commoners' Cantabria–Castilians for Europe (CC–CpE)	161	0.07	+0.03
Spanish Phalanx of the CNSO (FE de las JONS)	154	0.06	New
Internationalist Socialist Workers' Party (POSI)^{4}	135	0.05	+0.01
For a Fairer World (PUM+J)	125	0.05	New
The Unemployed (Los Parados)	91	0.04	New
New Green Left (NIV)	90	0.04	New
Humanist Party (PH)	76	0.03	−0.03
National Democracy (DN)	72	0.03	−0.01
Communist Party of the Peoples of Spain–Internationalist Struggle (PCPE–LI)	70	0.03	−0.15
Family and Life Party (PFyV)	61	0.02	New
Aralar (Aralar)	54	0.02	New
Spanish Democratic Party (PADE)	46	0.02	−0.13
The Phalanx (FE)	44	0.02	−0.06
Authentic Phalanx (FA)	33	0.01	New
Carlist Party (PC)	31	0.01	New
Liberal Coalition (CL)	31	0.01	New
Popular Unity Candidacy (CUP)	22	0.01	New
We–People's Unity (Nós–UP)	21	0.01	New
Regionalist Party of the Leonese Country (PREPAL)	20	0.01	−0.01
Liberal Centrist Union (UCL)	19	0.01	New
Catalan State (EC)	17	0.01	New
Blank ballots	2,044	0.83	−2.38
Total	247,446		
Valid votes	247,446	99.50	+0.46
Invalid votes	1,238	0.50	−0.46
Votes cast / turnout	248,684	51.84	−16.04
Abstentions	231,043	48.16	+16.04
Registered voters	479,727		
Sources
Footnotes: ^{1} The Greens–European Green Group results are compared to The Greens–Green Group totals in the 1999 election.; ^{2} Galeusca–Peoples of Europe results are compared to the combined totals of Convergence and Union and Galician Nationalist Bloc in the 1999 election.; ^{3} European Coalition (2004) results are compared to European Coalition (1999) totals in the 1999 election.; ^{4} Internationalist Socialist Workers' Party results are compared to Coalition for the Repeal of the Maastricht Treaty totals in the 1999 election.

=== Castile and León ===
← Summary of the 13 June 2004 European Parliament election results in Castile and León →
Parties and alliances	Popular vote		
Parties and alliances	Votes	%	±pp
People's Party (PP)	602,736	53.11	+0.28
Spanish Socialist Workers' Party (PSOE)	472,289	41.61	+7.83
United Left (IU)	27,311	2.41	−2.61
The Greens–European Green Group (LV–GVE)^{1}	4,384	0.39	−0.17
Cannabis Party for Legalisation and Normalisation (PCLyN)	4,295	0.38	New
Commoners' Land–Castilian Nationalist Party (TC–PNC)	2,418	0.21	−0.28
Regionalist Party of the Leonese Country (PREPAL)	1,473	0.13	−0.03
The Phalanx (FE)	1,413	0.12	+0.05
Democratic and Social Centre (CDS)	1,177	0.10	−0.32
Socialist Action Party (PASOC)	978	0.09	New
Internationalist Socialist Workers' Party (POSI)^{2}	820	0.07	+0.04
For a Fairer World (PUM+J)	618	0.05	New
Galeusca–Peoples of Europe (Galeusca)^{3}	552	0.05	−0.09
European Coalition (CE)^{4}	515	0.05	+0.02
Europe of the Peoples (EdP)^{5}	490	0.04	−0.01
Spanish Phalanx of the CNSO (FE de las JONS)	484	0.04	New
Liberal Centrist Union–Nationalist Party of Castile and León (UCL–PANCAL)	465	0.04	New
New Green Left (NIV)	437	0.04	New
The Unemployed (Los Parados)	404	0.04	New
Family and Life Party (PFyV)	403	0.04	New
National Democracy (DN)	350	0.03	−0.02
Spanish Democratic Party (PADE)	290	0.03	−0.15
Humanist Party (PH)	282	0.02	−0.04
Communist Party of the Peoples of Spain–Internationalist Struggle (PCPE–LI)	255	0.02	−0.09
Authentic Phalanx (FA)	184	0.02	New
We–People's Unity (Nós–UP)	163	0.01	New
Popular Unity Candidacy (CUP)	151	0.01	New
Aralar (Aralar)	135	0.01	New
Liberal Coalition (CL)	129	0.01	New
Carlist Party (PC)	91	0.01	New
Catalan State (EC)	81	0.01	New
Blank ballots	9,198	0.81	−1.62
Total	1,134,971		
Valid votes	1,134,971	99.65	+0.58
Invalid votes	4,014	0.35	−0.58
Votes cast / turnout	1,138,985	52.25	−14.81
Abstentions	1,040,816	47.75	+14.81
Registered voters	2,179,801		
Sources
Footnotes: ^{1} The Greens–European Green Group results are compared to The Greens–Green Group totals in the 1999 election.; ^{2} Internationalist Socialist Workers' Party results are compared to Coalition for the Repeal of the Maastricht Treaty totals in the 1999 election.; ^{3} Galeusca–Peoples of Europe results are compared to the combined totals of Convergence and Union and Galician Nationalist Bloc in the 1999 election.; ^{4} European Coalition (2004) results are compared to European Coalition (1999) totals in the 1999 election.; ^{5} Europe of the Peoples results are compared to Nationalist Coalition–Europe of the Peoples totals in the 1999 election.

=== Castilla–La Mancha ===
← Summary of the 13 June 2004 European Parliament election results in Castilla–La Mancha →
Parties and alliances	Popular vote		
Parties and alliances	Votes	%	±pp
People's Party (PP)	372,889	49.67	+2.31
Spanish Socialist Workers' Party (PSOE)	343,937	45.81	+0.36
United Left (IU)	19,922	2.65	−1.42
The Greens–European Green Group (LV–GVE)^{1}	2,231	0.30	±0.00
Cannabis Party for Legalisation and Normalisation (PCLyN)	2,096	0.28	New
Democratic and Social Centre (CDS)	567	0.08	−0.11
Socialist Action Party (PASOC)	511	0.07	New
Family and Life Party (PFyV)	475	0.06	New
The Phalanx (FE)	446	0.06	±0.00
Europe of the Peoples (EdP)^{2}	332	0.04	+0.03
Commoners' Land–Castilian Nationalist Party (TC–PNC)	327	0.04	−0.05
For a Fairer World (PUM+J)	304	0.04	New
Spanish Phalanx of the CNSO (FE de las JONS)	271	0.04	New
National Democracy (DN)	243	0.03	±0.00
Internationalist Socialist Workers' Party (POSI)^{3}	236	0.03	+0.01
New Green Left (NIV)	217	0.03	New
European Coalition (CE)^{4}	199	0.03	+0.01
The Unemployed (Los Parados)	184	0.02	New
Galeusca–Peoples of Europe (Galeusca)^{5}	167	0.02	−0.02
Spanish Democratic Party (PADE)	130	0.02	−0.06
Communist Party of the Peoples of Spain–Internationalist Struggle (PCPE–LI)	128	0.02	−0.05
Humanist Party (PH)	121	0.02	−0.02
Authentic Phalanx (FA)	99	0.01	New
Popular Unity Candidacy (CUP)	63	0.01	New
Liberal Coalition (CL)	54	0.01	New
Carlist Party (PC)	48	0.01	New
Regionalist Party of the Leonese Country (PREPAL)	43	0.01	±0.00
We–People's Unity (Nós–UP)	42	0.01	New
Liberal Centrist Union (UCL)	41	0.01	New
Aralar (Aralar)	40	0.01	New
Catalan State (EC)	27	0.00	New
Blank ballots	4,404	0.59	−0.88
Total	750,794		
Valid votes	750,794	99.64	+0.37
Invalid votes	2,745	0.36	−0.37
Votes cast / turnout	753,539	51.54	−23.10
Abstentions	708,610	48.46	+23.10
Registered voters	1,462,149		
Sources
Footnotes: ^{1} The Greens–European Green Group results are compared to The Greens–Green Group totals in the 1999 election.; ^{2} Europe of the Peoples results are compared to Nationalist Coalition–Europe of the Peoples totals in the 1999 election.; ^{3} Internationalist Socialist Workers' Party results are compared to Coalition for the Repeal of the Maastricht Treaty totals in the 1999 election.; ^{4} European Coalition (2004) results are compared to European Coalition (1999) totals in the 1999 election.; ^{5} Galeusca–Peoples of Europe results are compared to the combined totals of Convergence and Union and Galician Nationalist Bloc in the 1999 election.

=== Catalonia ===
← Summary of the 13 June 2004 European Parliament election results in Catalonia →
Parties and alliances	Popular vote		
Parties and alliances	Votes	%	±pp
Socialists' Party of Catalonia (PSC–PSOE)	907,121	42.85	+8.21
People's Party (PP)	377,104	17.81	+0.91
Convergence and Union (Galeusca–Peoples of Europe) (CiU)	369,103	17.44	−11.84
Republican Left of Catalonia (Europe of the Peoples) (ERC)	249,757	11.80	+5.74
Initiative for Catalonia Greens–United and Alternative Left (ICV–EUiA)^{1}	151,871	7.17	−0.31
The Greens–European Green Group (EV–GVE)^{2}	12,793	0.60	−0.67
Cannabis Party for Legalisation and Normalisation (PCLyN)	9,205	0.43	New
Popular Unity Candidacy (CUP)	6,185	0.29	New
Socialist Action Party (PASOC)	4,071	0.19	New
Democratic and Social Centre (CDS)	2,406	0.11	−0.04
European Coalition (CE)^{3}	2,130	0.10	+0.06
Family and Life Party (PFiV)	1,886	0.09	New
Catalan State (EC)	1,540	0.07	New
Internationalist Socialist Workers' Party (POSI)^{4}	1,325	0.06	+0.03
For a Fairer World (PUM+J)	1,270	0.06	New
National Democracy (DN)	895	0.04	−0.01
New Green Left (NIV)	756	0.04	New
Communist Party of the Peoples of Spain–Internationalist Struggle (PCPE–LI)	729	0.03	−0.19
The Phalanx (FE)	683	0.03	−0.03
The Unemployed (Los Parados)	625	0.03	New
Commoners' Land–Castilian Nationalist Party (TC–PNC)	621	0.03	±0.00
Spanish Phalanx of the CNSO (FE de las JONS)	532	0.03	New
Aralar (Aralar)	483	0.02	New
Spanish Democratic Party (PADE)	467	0.02	−0.02
Humanist Party (PH)	455	0.02	−0.04
Regionalist Party of the Leonese Country (PREPAL)	326	0.02	−0.02
Authentic Phalanx (FA)	233	0.01	New
Carlist Party (PC)	218	0.01	New
Liberal Coalition (CL)	209	0.01	New
We–People's Unity (Nós–UP)	156	0.01	New
Liberal Centrist Union (UCL)	150	0.01	New
Blank ballots	11,657	0.55	−1.18
Total	2,116,962		
Valid votes	2,116,962	99.79	+0.46
Invalid votes	4,418	0.21	−0.46
Votes cast / turnout	2,121,380	39.80	−15.03
Abstentions	3,208,407	60.20	+15.03
Registered voters	5,329,787		
Sources
Footnotes: ^{1} Initiative for Catalonia Greens–United and Alternative Left results are compared to the combined totals of Initiative for Catalonia–Greens and United and Alternative Left in the 1999 election.; ^{2} The Greens–European Green Group results are compared to The Greens–Green Group totals in the 1999 election.; ^{3} European Coalition (2004) results are compared to European Coalition (1999) totals in the 1999 election.; ^{4} Internationalist Socialist Workers' Party results are compared to Coalition for the Repeal of the Maastricht Treaty totals in the 1999 election.

=== Extremadura ===
← Summary of the 13 June 2004 European Parliament election results in Extremadura →
Parties and alliances	Popular vote		
Parties and alliances	Votes	%	±pp
Spanish Socialist Workers' Party (PSOE)	228,083	52.24	+5.73
People's Party (PP)	188,834	43.25	+0.71
United Left–Independent Socialists of Extremadura (IU–SIEX)^{1}	11,136	2.55	−4.35
United Extremadura (European Coalition) (EU)	1,688	0.39	−0.74
The Greens–European Green Group (LV–GVE)^{2}	1,093	0.25	−0.04
Cannabis Party for Legalisation and Normalisation (PCLyN)	1,025	0.23	New
Socialist Action Party (PASOC)	375	0.09	New
Democratic and Social Centre (CDS)	296	0.07	±0.00
The Phalanx (FE)	213	0.05	+0.01
Internationalist Socialist Workers' Party (POSI)^{3}	179	0.04	+0.02
For a Fairer World (PUM+J)	172	0.04	New
New Green Left (NIV)	139	0.03	New
The Unemployed (Los Parados)	131	0.03	New
Family and Life Party (PFyV)	121	0.03	New
Spanish Phalanx of the CNSO (FE de las JONS)	113	0.02	New
Popular Unity Candidacy (CUP)	97	0.02	New
National Democracy (DN)	95	0.02	±0.00
Spanish Democratic Party (PADE)	89	0.02	−0.01
Galeusca–Peoples of Europe (Galeusca)^{4}	86	0.02	−0.02
Europe of the Peoples (EdP)^{5}	85	0.02	±0.00
Communist Party of the Peoples of Spain–Internationalist Struggle (PCPE–LI)	73	0.02	−0.06
Authentic Phalanx (FA)	56	0.01	New
Humanist Party (PH)	50	0.01	−0.02
Regionalist Party of the Leonese Country (PREPAL)	47	0.01	−0.01
Aralar (Aralar)	33	0.01	New
Liberal Coalition (CL)	33	0.01	New
We–People's Unity (Nós–UP)	30	0.01	New
Commoners' Land–Castilian Nationalist Party (TC–PNC)	28	0.01	±0.00
Liberal Centrist Union (UCL)	25	0.01	New
Catalan State (EC)	22	0.01	New
Carlist Party (PC)	19	0.00	New
Blank ballots	2,148	0.49	−0.67
Total	436,614		
Valid votes	436,614	99.61	+0.33
Invalid votes	1,691	0.39	−0.33
Votes cast / turnout	438,305	49.50	−24.69
Abstentions	447,209	50.50	+24.69
Registered voters	885,514		
Sources
Footnotes: ^{1} United Left–Independent Socialists of Extremadura results are compared to the combined totals of United Left and Independent Socialists of Extremadura in the 1999 election.; ^{2} The Greens–European Green Group results are compared to The Greens–Green Group totals in the 1999 election.; ^{3} Internationalist Socialist Workers' Party results are compared to Coalition for the Repeal of the Maastricht Treaty totals in the 1999 election.; ^{4} Galeusca–Peoples of Europe results are compared to the combined totals of Convergence and Union and Galician Nationalist Bloc in the 1999 election.; ^{5} Europe of the Peoples results are compared to Nationalist Coalition–Europe of the Peoples totals in the 1999 election.

=== Galicia ===
← Summary of the 13 June 2004 European Parliament election results in Galicia →
Parties and alliances	Popular vote		
Parties and alliances	Votes	%	±pp
People's Party (PP)	549,073	47.72	−2.17
Socialists' Party of Galicia (PSdeG–PSOE)	416,573	36.20	+12.58
Galician Nationalist Bloc (Galeusca–Peoples of Europe) (BNG)	141,756	12.32	−9.66
United Left (EU–IU)	17.626	1.53	+0.39
Cannabis Party for Legalisation and Normalisation (PCLyN)	3,398	0.30	New
The Greens–European Green Group (OV–GVE)^{1}	2,677	0.23	−0.14
European Coalition (CE)^{2}	1,545	0.13	+0.10
We–People's Unity (Nós–UP)	1,331	0.12	New
Socialist Action Party (PASOC)	1,270	0.11	New
Democratic and Social Centre (CDS)	1,099	0.10	−0.05
Europe of the Peoples (EdP)^{3}	851	0.07	+0.04
Internationalist Socialist Workers' Party (POSI)^{4}	823	0.07	+0.04
For a Fairer World (PUM+J)	713	0.06	New
The Unemployed (Los Parados)	454	0.04	New
Humanist Party (PH)	414	0.04	−0.03
Family and Life Party (PFyV)	364	0.03	New
Spanish Democratic Party (PADE)	360	0.03	−0.04
National Democracy (DN)	358	0.03	−0.01
New Green Left (NIV)	321	0.03	New
Spanish Phalanx of the CNSO (FE de las JONS)	281	0.02	New
Communist Party of the Peoples of Spain–Internationalist Struggle (PCPE–LI)	262	0.02	−0.08
The Phalanx (FE)	259	0.02	−0.01
Popular Unity Candidacy (CUP)	172	0.01	New
Liberal Coalition (CL)	167	0.01	New
Regionalist Party of the Leonese Country (PREPAL)	165	0.01	−0.02
Aralar (Aralar)	140	0.01	New
Authentic Phalanx (FA)	123	0.01	New
Commoners' Land–Castilian Nationalist Party (TC–PNC)	122	0.01	−0.02
Liberal Centrist Union (UCL)	118	0.01	New
Carlist Party (PC)	96	0.01	New
Catalan State (EC)	91	0.01	New
Blank ballots	7,674	0.67	−0.69
Total	1,150,676		
Valid votes	1,150,676	99.61	+0.54
Invalid votes	4,517	0.39	−0.54
Votes cast / turnout	1,155,193	44.30	−16.52
Abstentions	1,452,198	55.70	+16.52
Registered voters	2,607,391		
Sources
Footnotes: ^{1} The Greens–European Green Group results are compared to The Greens–Green Group totals in the 1999 election.; ^{2} European Coalition (2004) results are compared to European Coalition (1999) totals in the 1999 election.; ^{3} Europe of the Peoples results are compared to Nationalist Coalition–Europe of the Peoples totals in the 1999 election.; ^{4} Internationalist Socialist Workers' Party results are compared to Coalition for the Repeal of the Maastricht Treaty totals in the 1999 election.

=== La Rioja ===
← Summary of the 13 June 2004 European Parliament election results in La Rioja →
Parties and alliances	Popular vote		
Parties and alliances	Votes	%	±pp
People's Party (PP)	64,795	51.27	−2.28
Spanish Socialist Workers' Party (PSOE)	55,410	43.85	+7.04
United Left (IU)	2,612	2.07	−1.90
The Greens–European Green Group (LV–GVE)^{1}	644	0.51	−0.21
Cannabis Party for Legalisation and Normalisation (PCLyN)	536	0.42	New
Citizen Initiative of La Rioja (Europe of the Peoples) (ICLR)	313	0.25	New
Galeusca–Peoples of Europe (Galeusca)^{2}	207	0.16	+0.08
For a Fairer World (PUM+J)	95	0.08	New
Socialist Action Party (PASOC)	92	0.07	New
Commoners' La Rioja–Castilians for Europe (CLR–CpE)	90	0.07	+0.04
Family and Life Party (PFyV)	81	0.06	New
National Democracy (DN)	68	0.05	+0.01
Democratic and Social Centre (CDS)	63	0.05	−0.12
Internationalist Socialist Workers' Party (POSI)^{3}	51	0.04	+0.02
European Coalition (CE)^{4}	48	0.04	+0.01
New Green Left (NIV)	42	0.03	New
The Unemployed (Los Parados)	40	0.03	New
Humanist Party (PH)	30	0.02	−0.03
The Phalanx (FE)	28	0.02	−0.02
Spanish Democratic Party (PADE)	26	0.02	−0.02
Aralar (Aralar)	25	0.02	New
Communist Party of the Peoples of Spain–Internationalist Struggle (PCPE–LI)	23	0.02	−0.08
Spanish Phalanx of the CNSO (FE de las JONS)	20	0.02	New
Carlist Party (PC)	20	0.02	New
Regionalist Party of the Leonese Country (PREPAL)	18	0.01	−0.02
Authentic Phalanx (FA)	14	0.01	New
We–People's Unity (Nós–UP)	13	0.01	New
Popular Unity Candidacy (CUP)	13	0.01	New
Liberal Coalition (CL)	11	0.01	New
Catalan State (EC)	9	0.01	New
Liberal Centrist Union (UCL)	4	0.00	New
Blank ballots	932	0.74	−1.63
Total	126,373		
Valid votes	126,373	99.65	+0.49
Invalid votes	446	0.35	−0.49
Votes cast / turnout	126,819	53.89	−14.16
Abstentions	108,492	46.11	+14.16
Registered voters	235,311		
Sources
Footnotes: ^{1} The Greens–European Green Group results are compared to The Greens–Green Group totals in the 1999 election.; ^{2} Galeusca–Peoples of Europe results are compared to the combined totals of Convergence and Union and Galician Nationalist Bloc in the 1999 election.; ^{3} Internationalist Socialist Workers' Party results are compared to Coalition for the Repeal of the Maastricht Treaty totals in the 1999 election.; ^{4} European Coalition (2004) results are compared to European Coalition (1999) totals in the 1999 election.

=== Madrid ===
← Summary of the 13 June 2004 European Parliament election results in Madrid →
Parties and alliances	Popular vote		
Parties and alliances	Votes	%	±pp
People's Party (PP)	1,088,712	49.54	+0.20
Spanish Socialist Workers' Party (PSOE)	941,954	42.86	+6.02
United Left of the Community of Madrid (IUCM)	112,780	5.13	−2.91
The Greens–European Green Group (LV–GVE)^{1}	12,234	0.56	−0.26
Cannabis Party for Legalisation and Normalisation (PCLyN)	6,467	0.29	New
Galeusca–Peoples of Europe (Galeusca)^{2}	2,102	0.10	−0.08
Democratic and Social Centre (CDS)	2,014	0.09	−0.21
Europe of the Peoples (EdP)^{3}	1,976	0.09	+0.03
National Democracy (DN)	1,679	0.08	+0.05
For a Fairer World (PUM+J)	1,646	0.07	New
European Coalition (CE)^{4}	1,353	0.06	+0.03
Family and Life Party (PFyV)	1,271	0.06	New
The Phalanx (FE)	922	0.04	−0.04
Socialist Action Party (PASOC)	807	0.04	New
Spanish Phalanx of the CNSO (FE de las JONS)	769	0.03	New
Commoners' Land–Castilian Nationalist Party (TC–PNC)	689	0.03	−0.02
Humanist Party (PH)	664	0.03	−0.07
The Unemployed (Los Parados)	621	0.03	New
New Green Left (NIV)	603	0.03	New
Internationalist Socialist Workers' Party (POSI)^{5}	532	0.02	−0.01
Spanish Democratic Party (PADE)	488	0.02	−0.07
Communist Party of the Peoples of Spain–Internationalist Struggle (PCPE–LI)	463	0.02	−0.10
Regionalist Party of the Leonese Country (PREPAL)	301	0.01	−0.02
Authentic Phalanx (FA)	275	0.01	New
Aralar (Aralar)	242	0.01	New
Liberal Coalition (CL)	221	0.01	New
Liberal Centrist Union (UCL)	125	0.01	New
We–People's Unity (Nós–UP)	121	0.01	New
Carlist Party (PC)	116	0.01	New
Catalan State (EC)	111	0.01	New
Popular Unity Candidacy (CUP)	93	0.00	New
Blank ballots	15,512	0.71	−1.23
Total	2,197,863		
Valid votes	2,197,863	99.81	+0.34
Invalid votes	4,199	0.19	−0.34
Votes cast / turnout	2,202,062	49.25	−11.52
Abstentions	2,269,554	50.75	+11.52
Registered voters	4,471,616		
Sources
Footnotes: ^{1} The Greens–European Green Group results are compared to The Greens–Green Group totals in the 1999 election.; ^{2} Galeusca–Peoples of Europe results are compared to the combined totals of Convergence and Union and Galician Nationalist Bloc in the 1999 election.; ^{3} Europe of the Peoples results are compared to Nationalist Coalition–Europe of the Peoples totals in the 1999 election.; ^{4} European Coalition (2004) results are compared to European Coalition (1999) totals in the 1999 election.; ^{5} Internationalist Socialist Workers' Party results are compared to Coalition for the Repeal of the Maastricht Treaty totals in the 1999 election.

=== Murcia ===
← Summary of the 13 June 2004 European Parliament election results in Murcia →
Parties and alliances	Popular vote		
Parties and alliances	Votes	%	±pp
People's Party (PP)	272,400	58.94	+5.77
Spanish Socialist Workers' Party (PSOE)	168,050	36.36	−0.01
United Left (IU)	13,164	2.85	−3.75
The Greens–European Green Group (LV–GVE)^{1}	2,113	0.46	−0.01
Cannabis Party for Legalisation and Normalisation (PCLyN)	1,295	0.28	New
Democratic and Social Centre (CDS)	351	0.08	−0.11
Socialist Action Party (PASOC)	269	0.06	New
For a Fairer World (PUM+J)	200	0.04	New
Family and Life Party (PFyV)	194	0.04	New
New Green Left (NIV)	190	0.04	New
Europe of the Peoples (EdP)^{2}	148	0.03	±0.00
Internationalist Socialist Workers' Party (POSI)^{3}	143	0.03	+0.01
Spanish Phalanx of the CNSO (FE de las JONS)	137	0.03	New
The Unemployed (Los Parados)	132	0.03	New
Spanish Democratic Party (PADE)	118	0.03	−0.56
European Coalition (CE)^{4}	112	0.02	±0.00
National Democracy (DN)	105	0.02	±0.00
Authentic Phalanx (FA)	102	0.02	New
Galeusca–Peoples of Europe (Galeusca)^{5}	101	0.02	−0.07
Humanist Party (PH)	90	0.02	−0.01
The Phalanx (FE)	81	0.02	−0.03
Communist Party of the Peoples of Spain–Internationalist Struggle (PCPE–LI)	64	0.01	−0.06
Commoners' Land–Castilian Nationalist Party (TC–PNC)	38	0.01	−0.01
Carlist Party (PC)	32	0.01	New
Popular Unity Candidacy (CUP)	32	0.01	New
Liberal Coalition (CL)	30	0.01	New
Aralar (Aralar)	29	0.01	New
Catalan State (EC)	29	0.01	New
Regionalist Party of the Leonese Country (PREPAL)	27	0.01	±0.00
We–People's Unity (Nós–UP)	19	0.00	New
Liberal Centrist Union (UCL)	19	0.00	New
Blank ballots	2,370	0.51	−0.78
Total	462,184		
Valid votes	462,184	99.75	+0.38
Invalid votes	1,153	0.25	−0.38
Votes cast / turnout	463,337	49.06	−18.52
Abstentions	481,060	50.94	+18.52
Registered voters	944,397		
Sources
Footnotes: ^{1} The Greens–European Green Group results are compared to The Greens–Green Group totals in the 1999 election.; ^{2} Europe of the Peoples results are compared to Nationalist Coalition–Europe of the Peoples totals in the 1999 election.; ^{3} Internationalist Socialist Workers' Party results are compared to Coalition for the Repeal of the Maastricht Treaty totals in the 1999 election.; ^{4} European Coalition (2004) results are compared to European Coalition (1999) totals in the 1999 election.; ^{5} Galeusca–Peoples of Europe results are compared to the combined totals of Convergence and Union and Galician Nationalist Bloc in the 1999 election.

=== Navarre ===
← Summary of the 13 June 2004 European Parliament election results in Navarre →
Parties and alliances	Popular vote		
Parties and alliances	Votes	%	±pp
People's Party (PP)	90,336	45.19	+3.10
Spanish Socialist Workers' Party (PSOE)	69,833	34.94	+10.16
Basque Solidarity (Europe of the Peoples) (EA)^{1}	9,684	4.84	n/a
Aralar (Aralar)	8,848	4.43	New
United Left of Navarre (IUN/NEB)	8,539	4.27	−1.13
Basque Nationalist Party (Galeusca–Peoples of Europe) (EAJ/PNV)^{1}	4,188	2.10	n/a
Convergence of Democrats of Navarre (European Coalition) (CDN)	1,729	0.86	New
Cannabis Party for Legalisation and Normalisation (PCLyN)	1,318	0.66	New
The Greens–European Green Group (LV–GVE)^{2}	1,253	0.63	−0.26
For a Fairer World (PUM+J)	279	0.14	New
Democratic and Social Centre (CDS)	273	0.14	−0.18
Carlist Party (PC)	264	0.13	New
Family and Life Party (PFyV)	202	0.10	New
Internationalist Socialist Workers' Party (POSI)^{3}	185	0.09	+0.06
Socialist Action Party (PASOC)	181	0.09	New
New Green Left (NIV)	167	0.08	New
Communist Party of the Peoples of Spain–Internationalist Struggle (PCPE–LI)	141	0.07	−0.05
Humanist Party (PH)	113	0.06	−0.03
National Democracy (DN)	107	0.05	−0.03
The Unemployed (Los Parados)	106	0.05	New
The Phalanx (FE)	100	0.05	+0.03
We–People's Unity (Nós–UP)	52	0.03	New
Spanish Phalanx of the CNSO (FE de las JONS)	46	0.02	New
Regionalist Party of the Leonese Country (PREPAL)	39	0.02	−0.01
Spanish Democratic Party (PADE)	38	0.02	−0.03
Commoners' Land–Castilian Nationalist Party (TC–PNC)	29	0.01	−0.02
Catalan State (EC)	28	0.01	New
Liberal Coalition (CL)	28	0.01	New
Authentic Phalanx (FA)	25	0.01	New
Popular Unity Candidacy (CUP)	23	0.01	New
Liberal Centrist Union (UCL)	20	0.01	New
Blank ballots	1,714	0.86	−2.20
Total	199,888		
Valid votes	199,888	92.72	−6.36
Invalid votes	15,683	7.28	+6.36
Votes cast / turnout	215,571	46.16	−19.05
Abstentions	251,447	53.84	+19.05
Registered voters	467,018		
Sources
Footnotes: ^{1} Within the Basque Solidarity–Basque Nationalist Party alliance in the 1999 election.; ^{2} The Greens–European Green Group results are compared to The Greens–Green Group totals in the 1999 election.; ^{3} Internationalist Socialist Workers' Party results are compared to Coalition for the Repeal of the Maastricht Treaty totals in the 1999 election.

=== Valencian Community ===
← Summary of the 13 June 2004 European Parliament election results in the Valencian Community →
Parties and alliances	Popular vote		
Parties and alliances	Votes	%	±pp
People's Party (PP)	868,948	49.72	+2.06
Spanish Socialist Workers' Party (PSOE)	737,669	42.21	+6.60
United Left of the Valencian Country: Agreement (EUPV–Entesa)	58,253	3.33	−2.44
Valencian Nationalist Bloc (Galeusca–Peoples of Europe) (Bloc)	19,627	1.12	−1.29
Republican Left of the Valencian Country (Europe of the Peoples) (ERPV)	15,703	0.90	+0.77
The Greens–European Green Group (EV–GVE)^{1}	9,426	0.54	−0.22
Cannabis Party for Legalisation and Normalisation (PCLyN)	8,984	0.51	New
Valencian Union (European Coalition) (UV)	8,527	0.49	−3.47
Democratic and Social Centre (CDS)	1,271	0.07	−0.04
Family and Life Party (PFyV)	1,102	0.06	New
National Democracy (DN)	977	0.06	+0.02
For a Fairer World (PUM+J)	787	0.05	New
Internationalist Socialist Workers' Party (POSI)^{2}	768	0.04	+0.01
Socialist Action Party (PASOC)	699	0.04	New
Popular Unity Candidacy (CUP)	697	0.04	New
The Unemployed (Los Parados)	671	0.04	New
Communist Party of the Peoples of Spain–Internationalist Struggle (PCPE–LI)	496	0.03	−0.09
New Green Left (NIV)	489	0.03	New
Spanish Phalanx of the CNSO (FE de las JONS)	473	0.03	New
Humanist Party (PH)	461	0.03	−0.02
Aralar (Aralar)	333	0.02	New
Spanish Democratic Party (PADE)	329	0.02	−0.03
The Phalanx (FE)	326	0.02	−0.04
Authentic Phalanx (FA)	266	0.02	New
Liberal Coalition (CL)	220	0.01	New
Catalan State (EC)	186	0.01	New
Commoners' Land–Castilian Nationalist Party (TC–PNC)	155	0.01	−0.01
Carlist Party (PC)	147	0.01	New
Regionalist Party of the Leonese Country (PREPAL)	124	0.01	−0.01
Liberal Centrist Union (UCL)	114	0.01	New
We–People's Unity (Nós–UP)	108	0.01	New
Blank ballots	9,450	0.54	−0.99
Total	1,747,786		
Valid votes	1,747,786	99.69	+0.47
Invalid votes	5,460	0.31	−0.47
Votes cast / turnout	1,753,246	50.46	−17.50
Abstentions	1,721,334	49.54	+17.50
Registered voters	3,474,580		
Sources
Footnotes: ^{1} The Greens–European Green Group results are compared to The Greens–Green Group totals in the 1999 election.; ^{2} Internationalist Socialist Workers' Party results are compared to Coalition for the Repeal of the Maastricht Treaty totals in the 1999 election.

== Autonomous cities ==
=== Ceuta ===
← Summary of the 13 June 2004 European Parliament election results in Ceuta →
Parties and alliances	Popular vote		
Parties and alliances	Votes	%	±pp
People's Party (PP)	10,388	58.12	−2.69
Spanish Socialist Workers' Party (PSOE)	7,010	39.22	+10.76
United Left (IU)	110	0.62	−3.09
The Greens–European Green Group (LV–GVE)^{1}	35	0.20	−0.63
European Coalition (CE)	26	0.15	±0.00
Cannabis Party for Legalisation and Normalisation (PCLyN)	26	0.15	New
The Phalanx (FE)	23	0.13	±0.00
Socialist Action Party (PASOC)	20	0.11	New
Spanish Phalanx of the CNSO (FE de las JONS)	18	0.10	New
Democratic and Social Centre (CDS)	11	0.06	−0.18
Communist Party of the Peoples of Spain–Internationalist Struggle (PCPE–LI)	10	0.06	−0.08
Galeusca–Peoples of Europe (Galeusca)^{2}	9	0.05	−0.14
For a Fairer World (PUM+J)	8	0.04	New
National Democracy (DN)	7	0.04	−0.02
Internationalist Socialist Workers' Party (POSI)^{3}	7	0.04	−0.02
New Green Left (NIV)	7	0.04	New
Spanish Democratic Party (PADE)	7	0.04	−0.05
Europe of the Peoples (EdP)^{4}	5	0.03	−0.04
Family and Life Party (PFyV)	4	0.02	New
The Unemployed (Los Parados)	4	0.02	New
Carlist Party (PC)	3	0.02	New
We–People's Unity (Nós–UP)	3	0.02	New
Popular Unity Candidacy (CUP)	3	0.02	New
Aralar (Aralar)	3	0.02	New
Liberal Coalition (CL)	3	0.02	New
Regionalist Party of the Leonese Country (PREPAL)	2	0.01	−0.02
Humanist Party (PH)	2	0.01	−0.12
Commoners' Land–Castilian Nationalist Party (TC–PNC)	2	0.01	−0.05
Authentic Phalanx (FA)	2	0.02	New
Catalan State (EC)	1	0.01	New
Liberal Centrist Union (UCL)	1	0.01	New
Blank ballots	114	0.64	−1.34
Total	17,874		
Valid votes	17,874	99.49	+1.01
Invalid votes	92	0.51	−1.01
Votes cast / turnout	17,966	31.67	−25.59
Abstentions	38,766	68.33	+25.59
Registered voters	56,732		
Sources
Footnotes: ^{1} The Greens–European Green Group results are compared to The Greens–Green Group totals in the 1999 election.; ^{2} Galeusca–Peoples of Europe results are compared to the combined totals of Convergence and Union and Galician Nationalist Bloc in the 1999 election.; ^{3} Internationalist Socialist Workers' Party results are compared to Coalition for the Repeal of the Maastricht Treaty totals in the 1999 election.; ^{4} Europe of the Peoples results are compared to Nationalist Coalition–Europe of the Peoples totals in the 1999 election.

=== Melilla ===
← Summary of the 13 June 2004 European Parliament election results in Melilla →
Parties and alliances	Popular vote		
Parties and alliances	Votes	%	±pp
People's Party (PP)	8,023	52.44	+2.32
Spanish Socialist Workers' Party (PSOE)	6,815	44.55	+7.03
United Left (IU)	153	1.00	−3.50
Cannabis Party for Legalisation and Normalisation (PCLyN)	32	0.21	New
European Coalition (CE)	30	0.20	−0.06
The Greens–European Green Group (LV–GVE)^{1}	28	0.18	−0.83
Democratic and Social Centre (CDS)	27	0.18	−0.09
Socialist Action Party (PASOC)	19	0.12	New
Europe of the Peoples (EdP)^{2}	13	0.08	−0.03
The Phalanx (FE)	11	0.07	−0.13
Internationalist Socialist Workers' Party (POSI)^{3}	8	0.05	−0.06
Galeusca–Peoples of Europe (Galeusca)^{4}	8	0.05	−0.34
National Democracy (DN)	5	0.03	−0.03
Family and Life Party (PFyV)	5	0.03	New
Authentic Phalanx (FA)	5	0.03	New
Commoners' Land–Castilian Nationalist Party (TC–PNC)	5	0.03	−0.01
Communist Party of the Peoples of Spain–Internationalist Struggle (PCPE–LI)	4	0.03	−0.14
Carlist Party (PC)	4	0.03	New
The Unemployed (Los Parados)	4	0.03	New
For a Fairer World (PUM+J)	3	0.02	New
Catalan State (EC)	2	0.01	New
Regionalist Party of the Leonese Country (PREPAL)	2	0.01	−0.08
Aralar (Aralar)	2	0.01	New
New Green Left (NIV)	2	0.01	New
Liberal Centrist Union (UCL)	2	0.01	New
Liberal Coalition (CL)	2	0.01	New
Spanish Phalanx of the CNSO (FE de las JONS)	2	0.01	New
Spanish Democratic Party (PADE)	2	0.01	−0.05
We–People's Unity (Nós–UP)	1	0.01	New
Humanist Party (PH)	0	0.00	−0.12
Popular Unity Candidacy (CUP)	0	0.00	New
Blank ballots	79	0.52	−2.02
Total	15,298		
Valid votes	15,298	99.68	+0.62
Invalid votes	49	0.32	−0.62
Votes cast / turnout	15,347	31.28	−20.12
Abstentions	33,713	68.72	+20.12
Registered voters	49,060		
Sources
Footnotes: ^{1} The Greens–European Green Group results are compared to The Greens–Green Group totals in the 1999 election.; ^{2} Europe of the Peoples results are compared to Nationalist Coalition–Europe of the Peoples totals in the 1999 election.; ^{3} Internationalist Socialist Workers' Party results are compared to Coalition for the Repeal of the Maastricht Treaty totals in the 1999 election.; ^{4} Galeusca–Peoples of Europe results are compared to the combined totals of Convergence and Union and Galician Nationalist Bloc in the 1999 election.

== Congress of Deputies projection ==
A projection of European Parliament election results using electoral rules for the Congress of Deputies would have given the following seat allocation, as distributed per constituencies and regions: (Note: Note that results are compared with party totals in the preceding general election—held in March 2004—for consistency.)

Summary of the 13 June 2004 Congress of Deputies projected election results
Parties and alliances	Popular vote			Seats	
Parties and alliances	Votes	%	±pp	Total	+/−
Spanish Socialist Workers' Party (PSOE)	6,741,112	43.46	+0.87	163	−1
People's Party (PP)	6,393,192	41.21	+3.50	157	+9
United Left–Initiative for Catalonia Greens–EUiA (IU–ICV–EUiA)	643,136	4.15	−0.81	3	−2
Convergence and Union (CiU)	369,103	2.38	−0.85	9	−1
Republican Left of Catalonia (ERC)	272,958	1.76	−0.76	5	−3
Basque Nationalist Party (EAJ/PNV)	253,331	1.63	±0.00	7	±0
Galician Nationalist Bloc (BNG)	141,756	0.91	+0.10	2	±0
Canarian Coalition (CC)	90,619	0.58	−0.33	3	±0
Basque Solidarity (EA)	64,509	0.42	+0.11	1	±0
Aragonese Union (CHA)	29,520	0.19	−0.17	0	−1
Navarre Yes (NaBai)	n/a	n/a	−0.24	0	−1
Others	418,032	2.69	—	0	±0
Blank ballots	95,014	0.61	−0.97		
Total	15,512,282			350	±0

=== Constituencies ===

Summary of constituency results in the 13 June 2004 European Parliament election in Spain
Constituency	PSOE		PP		IU–ICV		CiU		ERC		PNV		BNG		CC		EA	
Constituency	%	S	%	S	%	S	%	S	%	S	%	S	%	S	%	S	%	S
A Coruña	37.2	4	45.3	4	1.8	−							13.4	1				
Álava	31.8	2	31.0	1	3.8	−					23.8	1					5.8	−
Albacete	46.7	2	48.1	2	3.1	−												
Alicante	42.6	5	51.1	6	2.7	−			0.6	−								
Almería	48.9	3	45.3	2	2.4	−												
Asturias	46.4	4	44.4	4	6.3	−												
Ávila	34.1	1	61.3	2	2.3	−												
Badajoz	52.7	3	42.7	3	2.9	−												
Balearic Islands	38.8	4	46.6	4	2.4	−			2.9	−								
Barcelona	44.6	15	18.4	6	7.9	2	15.8	5	10.4	3								
Biscay	27.3	3	20.3	2	4.3	−					39.7	4					5.5	−
Burgos	38.4	2	55.2	2	2.5	−												
Cáceres	51.6	2	44.1	2	2.1	−												
Cádiz	53.1	5	36.8	4	4.5	−												
Cantabria	42.3	2	52.5	3	2.5	−												
Castellón	43.8	2	49.0	3	2.2	−			1.1	−								
Ceuta	39.2	−	58.1	1	0.6	−												
Ciudad Real	47.9	2	48.2	3	2.2	−												
Córdoba	53.0	4	35.6	3	7.1	−												
Cuenca	44.5	1	51.7	2	2.0	−												
Gipuzkoa	28.3	2	17.6	1	4.0	−					32.0	2					13.2	1
Girona	35.6	2	12.6	1	5.7	−	24.9	2	17.9	1								
Granada	52.9	4	39.1	3	4.7	−												
Guadalajara	42.5	1	51.2	2	3.6	−												
Huelva	58.3	3	32.6	2	4.3	−												
Huesca	47.2	2	40.4	1	2.5	−												
Jaén	56.6	4	35.3	2	4.6	−												
La Rioja	43.8	2	51.3	2	2.1	−												
Las Palmas	37.7	3	46.9	4	1.8	−									10.9	1		
León	48.2	3	47.3	2	2.0	−												
Lleida	35.6	2	17.1	1	4.2	−	25.2	1	15.0	−								
Lugo	36.2	2	50.6	2	0.9	−							10.3	−				
Madrid	42.9	16	49.5	18	5.1	1												
Málaga	52.0	6	38.4	4	5.1	−												
Melilla	44.5	−	52.4	1	1.0	−												
Murcia	36.4	3	58.9	6	2.8	−												
Navarre	34.9	2	45.2	3	4.3	−					2.1	−					4.8	−
Ourense	31.9	1	55.9	3	0.8	−							9.6	−				
Palencia	41.7	1	53.0	2	2.5	−												
Pontevedra	36.9	3	45.8	3	1.9	−							13.0	1				
Salamanca	39.4	2	56.2	2	1.8	−												
Santa Cruz de Tenerife	39.3	3	33.1	2	1.9	−									22.9	2		
Segovia	38.9	1	55.2	2	2.7	−												
Seville	58.0	8	31.2	4	5.6	−												
Soria	38.9	1	56.1	2	1.9	−												
Tarragona	40.3	3	18.2	1	4.8	−	18.6	1	15.1	1								
Teruel	43.7	1	43.7	2	2.2	−												
Toledo	45.1	2	50.5	3	2.7	−												
Valencia	41.7	7	49.0	9	4.0	−			1.0	−								
Valladolid	43.6	2	50.2	3	3.4	−												
Zamora	40.3	1	55.3	2	1.7	−												
Zaragoza	45.9	4	39.2	3	3.3	−												
Total	43.5	163	41.2	157	4.1	3	2.4	9	1.8	5	1.6	7	0.9	2	0.6	3	0.4	1

=== Regions ===

Summary of regional results in the 13 June 2004 European Parliament election in Spain
Region	PSOE		PP		IU–ICV		CiU		ERC		PNV		BNG		CC		EA	
Region	%	S	%	S	%	S	%	S	%	S	%	S	%	S	%	S	%	S
Andalusia	54.4	37	36.1	24	5.0	−												
Aragon	45.8	7	40.0	6	3.1	−												
Asturias	46.4	4	44.4	4	6.3	−												
Balearic Islands	38.8	4	46.6	4	2.4	−			2.9	−								
Basque Country	28.2	7	21.0	4	4.2	−					35.3	7					7.8	1
Canary Islands	38.5	6	40.0	6	1.8	−									16.9	3		
Cantabria	42.3	2	52.5	3	2.5	−												
Castile and León	41.6	14	53.1	19	2.4	−												
Castilla–La Mancha	45.8	8	49.7	12	2.7	−												
Catalonia	42.9	22	17.8	9	7.2	2	17.4	9	11.8	5								
Ceuta	39.2	−	58.1	1	0.6	−												
Extremadura	52.2	5	43.2	5	2.6	−												
Galicia	36.2	10	47.7	12	1.5	−							12.3	2				
La Rioja	43.8	2	51.3	2	2.1	−												
Madrid	42.9	16	49.5	18	5.1	1												
Melilla	44.5	−	52.4	1	1.0	−												
Murcia	36.4	3	58.9	6	2.8	−												
Navarre	34.9	2	45.2	3	4.3	−					2.1	−					4.8	−
Valencian Community	42.2	14	49.7	18	3.3	−			0.9	−								
Total	43.5	163	41.2	157	4.1	3	2.4	9	1.8	5	1.6	7	0.9	2	0.6	3	0.4	1
