= Coalition for Europe (2009) =

Coalition for Europe Coalición por Europa
- Abbreviation: CEU
- Leader: Ramon Tremosa
- Founded: 2009
- Dissolved: 2014
- Preceded by: Galeusca–Peoples of Europe; European Coalition (2004)
- Succeeded by: Coalition for Europe (2014)
- Ideology: Regionalism; Europeanism
- Political position: Centre
- European Parliament group: ALDE (CDC, EAJ-PNV); EPP (UDC)

Coalition for Europe (Spanish: Coalición por Europa, CEU) was a Spanish electoral list in the European Parliament election in 2009 made up from regionalist parties. It was the successor to the 2004 list Galeusca–Peoples of Europe, but in 2009 did not include the Galician Nationalist Bloc. The list won two seats in the 2009 election, obtaining 5.1% of the vote.

== Composition ==
Party	Scope
Convergence and Union (CiU)	Catalonia
Basque Nationalist Party (EAJ/PNV)	Basque Country, Navarre
Canarian Coalition (CC)	Canary Islands
Valencian Nationalist Bloc (Bloc)	Valencian Community
Majorcan Union (UM)	Balearic Islands
Andalusian Party (PA)	Andalusia
Menorcan Union (UMe)	Balearic Islands
Democratic Convergence of La Franja (CDF)	Aragon

== Electoral performance ==
=== European Parliament ===
European Parliament
Election	Vote	%	Score	Seats	+/–
2009	808,246	5.1	3rd	3 / 54	1
