= Sub-national opinion polling for the 2008 Spanish general election =

In the run up to the 2008 Spanish general election, various organisations carried out opinion polling to gauge voting intention in autonomous communities and constituencies in Spain during the term of the 8th Cortes Generales. Results of such polls are displayed in this article. The date range for these opinion polls is from the previous general election, held on 14 March 2004, to the day the next election was held, on 9 March 2008.

Voting intention estimates refer mainly to a hypothetical Congress of Deputies election. Polls are listed in reverse chronological order, showing the most recent first and using the dates when the survey fieldwork was done, as opposed to the date of publication. Where the fieldwork dates are unknown, the date of publication is given instead. The highest percentage figure in each polling survey is displayed with its background shaded in the leading party's colour. If a tie ensues, this is applied to the figures with the highest percentages. The "Lead" columns on the right shows the percentage-point difference between the parties with the highest percentages in a given poll.

Refusals are generally excluded from the party vote percentages, while question wording and the treatment of "don't know" responses and those not intending to vote may vary between polling organisations. When available, seat projections are displayed below the percentages in a smaller font.

== Autonomous communities ==
=== Andalusia ===
Polling firm/Commissioner	Fieldwork date	Sample size	Turnout	PSOE	PP	IULV	PA	Lead
2008 general election	9 Mar 2008	—N/a	72.8	51.9; 36	38.2; 25	5.1; 0	1.5; 0	13.7
Sigma Dos/El Mundo	20 Feb–1 Mar 2008	?	?	50.0– 51.0; 34/35	39.0– 40.0; 26/27	–	–	11.0
Metroscopia/El País	8–27 Feb 2008	?	?	? 37	? 24	–	–	?
Celeste-Tel/Terra	22–28 Jan 2008	1,816	?	51.0– 52.0; 35/36	36.0– 37.0; 25	6.0– 7.0; 0/1	–	15.0
Obradoiro de Socioloxía/Público	20 Nov–21 Dec 2007	?	?	? 34	? 26	? 1	–	?
Opina/El País	13–15 Feb 2006	1,500	?	48.5; 34/36	35.0; 24/26	–	–	13.5
Opina/El País	28 Feb 2005	1,500	?	54.0	34.0	–	–	20.0
2004 EP election	13 Jun 2004	—N/a	40.9	54.4 (37)	36.1 (24)	5.0 (0)	2.6 (0)	18.3
2004 general election	14 Mar 2004	—N/a	74.8	52.9; 38	33.7; 23	6.4; 0	4.0; 0	19.2

=== Aragon ===
Polling firm/Commissioner	Fieldwork date	Sample size	Turnout	PSOE	PP	CHA	PAR	IU	Lead
2008 general election	9 Mar 2008	—N/a	75.9	46.4; 8	37.0; 5	5.0; 0	5.2; 0	2.8; 0	9.4
Sigma Dos/El Mundo	20 Feb–1 Mar 2008	?	?	47.0– 48.0; 8	36.0– 37.0; 5	–	–	–	11.0
Metroscopia/El País	8–27 Feb 2008	?	?	? 7/8	? 5/6	? 0	–	–	?
Celeste-Tel/Terra	22–28 Jan 2008	1,816	?	45.0– 46.0; 7/8	38.0– 40.0; 5	5.0– 6.0; 0/1	5.0– 6.0; 0	3.0– 4.0; 0	6.0– 7.0
Obradoiro de Socioloxía/Público	20 Nov–21 Dec 2007	?	?	? 8	? 5	–	–	–	?
2004 EP election	13 Jun 2004	—N/a	47.3	45.8 (7)	40.0 (6)	6.1 (0)	2.9 (0)	3.1 (0)	5.8
2004 general election	14 Mar 2004	—N/a	77.0	41.3; 7	36.5; 5	12.1; 1	4.7; 0	2.8; 0	4.8

=== Asturias ===
Polling firm/Commissioner	Fieldwork date	Sample size	Turnout	PP	PSOE	IU	Lead
2008 general election	9 Mar 2008	—N/a	71.3	41.6; 4	46.9; 4	7.2; 0	5.3
Ipsos/La Nueva España	29 Feb–2 Mar 2008	400	?	39.3; 4	46.4; 4	9.3; 0	7.1
Sigma Dos/El Mundo	20 Feb–1 Mar 2008	?	?	45.0– 46.0; 4	43.0– 44.0; 4	–	2.0
Metroscopia/El País	8–27 Feb 2008	?	?	? 4	? 4	–	Tie
Celeste-Tel/Terra	22–28 Jan 2008	1,816	?	42.0– 43.0; 4	45.0– 46.0; 4	9.0– 10.0; 0	3.0
Obradoiro de Socioloxía/Público	20 Nov–21 Dec 2007	?	?	? 4	? 4	–	Tie
2004 EP election	13 Jun 2004	—N/a	44.9	44.4 (4)	46.4 (4)	6.3 (0)	2.0
2004 general election	14 Mar 2004	—N/a	71.7	43.8; 4	43.4; 4	8.4; 0	0.4

=== Balearic Islands ===
Polling firm/Commissioner	Fieldwork date	Sample size	Turnout	PP	PSOE	PIB	UM	IU	UIB	Lead
2008 general election	9 Mar 2008	—N/a	67.6	44.0; 4	44.2; 4	–	–	2.8; 0	5.4; 0	0.2
Sigma Dos/El Mundo	20 Feb–1 Mar 2008	?	?	45.0– 46.0; 4	43.0– 44.0; 4	–	–	–	–	2.0
Metroscopia/El País	8–27 Feb 2008	?	?	? 3	? 5	–	–	–	–	?
Celeste-Tel/Terra	22–28 Jan 2008	764	?	42.0– 43.0; 3/4	43.0– 44.0; 4	–	–	3.0– 4.0; 0	7.0– 8.0; 0/1	1.0
Obradoiro de Socioloxía/Público	20 Nov–21 Dec 2007	?	?	? 4	? 4	–	–	–	–	Tie
2004 EP election	13 Jun 2004	—N/a	37.6	46.6 (4)	38.8 (4)	–	3.1 (0)	2.4 (0)	6.5 (0)	7.8
2004 general election	14 Mar 2004	—N/a	68.8	45.9; 4	39.5; 4	8.6; 0	2.2; 0	(Note: Within PIB.)	–	6.4

=== Basque Country ===
Polling firm/Commissioner	Fieldwork date	Sample size	Turnout	PNV	PSE–EE	PP	IU	EA	Aralar	UPyD	Lead
2008 general election	9 Mar 2008	—N/a	64.0	27.1; 6	38.1; 9	18.5; 3	4.5; 0	4.5; 0	2.7; 0	0.9; 0	11.0
Sigma Dos/El Mundo	20 Feb–1 Mar 2008	?	?	30.0– 31.0; 7	32.0– 33.0; 7/8	18.0– 19.0; 3	–	6.0– 7.0; 0/1	–	–	2.0
Metroscopia/El País	8–27 Feb 2008	?	?	? 7	? 7	? 3	–	? 1	–	–	Tie
Ikertalde/GPS	15–29 Jan 2008	2,864	69	32.6; 7	27.6; 6	19.2; 4	7.3; 0	6.2; 1	3.5; 0	1.3; 0	6.0
Celeste-Tel/Terra	22–28 Jan 2008	845	?	29.0– 30.0; 6/7	36.0– 37.0; 8/9	17.0– 18.0; 3	5.0– 6.0; 0	5.0– 6.0; 0	3.0– 4.0; 0	–	7.0
Obradoiro de Socioloxía/Público	20 Nov–21 Dec 2007	?	?	? 7	? 7	? 4	–	–	–	–	Tie
2004 EP election	13 Jun 2004	—N/a	44.6	35.3 (7)	28.2 (7)	21.0 (4)	4.2 (0)	7.8 (1)	1.3 (0)	–	7.1
2004 general election	14 Mar 2004	—N/a	75.0	33.7; 7	27.2; 7	18.9; 4	8.2; 0	6.5; 1	3.1; 0	–	6.5

=== Canary Islands ===
Polling firm/Commissioner	Fieldwork date	Sample size	Turnout	PP	PSOE	CC	IU	NCa	Lead
2008 general election	9 Mar 2008	—N/a	65.9	35.0; 6	39.6; 7	17.5; 2	1.2; 0	3.8; 0	4.6
Sigma Dos/El Mundo	20 Feb–1 Mar 2008	?	?	36.0– 37.0; 5/7	41.0– 42.0; 6/8	15.0– 16.0; 2	–	–	5.0
Metroscopia/El País	8–27 Feb 2008	?	?	? 6	? 7	? 2	–	–	?
Celeste-Tel/Terra	22–28 Jan 2008	449	?	35.0– 36.0; 6	37.0– 38.0; 7	18.0– 19.0; 2/3	1.0– 2.0; 0	5.0– 6.0; 0/1	2.0
Obradoiro de Socioloxía/Público	20 Nov–21 Dec 2007	?	?	? 6	? 7	? 2	–	–	?
2004 EP election	13 Jun 2004	—N/a	36.5	40.0 (6)	38.5 (6)	16.9 (3)	1.8 (0)	–	1.5
2004 general election	14 Mar 2004	—N/a	66.7	35.4; 6	34.5; 6	24.3; 3	1.9; 0	–	0.9

=== Cantabria ===
Polling firm/Commissioner	Fieldwork date	Sample size	Turnout	PP	PSOE	IU	Lead
2008 general election	9 Mar 2008	—N/a	76.4	50.0; 3	43.6; 2	2.3; 0	6.4
Sigma Dos/El Mundo	20 Feb–1 Mar 2008	?	?	52.0– 53.0; 3	41.0– 42.0; 2	–	11.0
Metroscopia/El País	8–27 Feb 2008	?	?	? 3	? 2	–	?
Celeste-Tel/Terra	22–28 Jan 2008	182	?	51.0– 52.0; 3	42.0– 43.0; 2	3.0– 4.0; 0	9.0
Obradoiro de Socioloxía/Público	20 Nov–21 Dec 2007	?	?	? 3	? 2	–	?
2004 EP election	13 Jun 2004	—N/a	51.8	52.5 (3)	42.3 (2)	2.5 (0)	10.2
2004 general election	14 Mar 2004	—N/a	77.2	51.9; 3	40.9; 2	3.3; 0	11.0

=== Castile and León ===
Polling firm/Commissioner	Fieldwork date	Sample size	Turnout	PP	PSOE	IU	Lead
2008 general election	9 Mar 2008	—N/a	77.7	50.0; 18	42.8; 14	2.5; 0	7.2
Sigma Dos/El Mundo	20 Feb–1 Mar 2008	?	?	49.0– 50.0; 17/19	43.0– 44.0; 13/15	–	6.0
Metroscopia/El País	8–27 Feb 2008	?	?	? 16/18	? 14/16	–	?
Celeste-Tel/Terra	22–28 Jan 2008	1,285	?	51.0– 52.0; 18/19	41.0– 42.0; 13/14	3.0– 4.0; 0	10.0
Obradoiro de Socioloxía/Público	20 Nov–21 Dec 2007	?	?	? 18	? 14	–	?
2004 EP election	13 Jun 2004	—N/a	52.3	53.1 (19)	41.6 (14)	2.4 (0)	11.5
2004 general election	14 Mar 2004	—N/a	77.8	50.3; 19	41.9; 14	2.8; 0	8.4

=== Castilla–La Mancha ===
Polling firm/Commissioner	Fieldwork date	Sample size	Turnout	PP	PSOE	IU	Lead
2008 general election	9 Mar 2008	—N/a	80.0	49.4; 12	44.5; 9	2.9; 0	4.9
Sigma Dos/El Mundo	20 Feb–1 Mar 2008	?	?	46.0– 47.0; 11/12	46.0– 47.0; 9/10	–	Tie
Metroscopia/El País	8–27 Feb 2008	?	?	? 11/12	? 9/10	–	?
Celeste-Tel/Terra	22–28 Jan 2008	764	?	49.0– 50.0; 11/12	45.0– 46.0; 9/10	2.0– 3.0; 0	4.0
Obradoiro de Socioloxía/Público	20 Nov–21 Dec 2007	?	?	? 11	? 10	–	?
2004 EP election	13 Jun 2004	—N/a	51.5	49.7 (12)	45.8 (8)	2.7 (0)	3.9
2004 general election	14 Mar 2004	—N/a	79.9	47.4; 11	46.5; 9	3.4; 0	0.9

=== Catalonia ===
Color key:

Exit poll

Polling firm/Commissioner	Fieldwork date	Sample size	Turnout	PSC	CiU	ERC	PP	ICV–EUiA	Lead
2008 general election	9 Mar 2008	—N/a	70.3	45.4; 25	20.9; 10	7.8; 3	16.4; 8	4.9; 1	24.5
Ipsos/RTVE–FORTA	9 Mar 2008	?	?	45.7; 24/27	20.9; 9/11	8.4; 3/4	16.3; 7/8	3.9; 1	24.8
Sigma Dos/El Mundo	20 Feb–1 Mar 2008	?	?	42.0– 43.0; 20/24	19.0– 20.0; 9/11	11.0– 12.0; 5/6	16.0– 17.0; 6/9	5.0– 6.0; 2	23.0
Obradoiro de Socioloxía/Público	18 Feb–1 Mar 2008	?	?	? 23/24	? 8/9	? 4	? 9	? 2	?
Metroscopia/El País	8–27 Feb 2008	?	?	? 22	? 9	? 5/6	? 8/9	? 2	?
Noxa/La Vanguardia	8–14 Feb 2008	800	?	42.7; 23	20.0; 10	10.2; 5	17.6; 7	6.6; 2	22.7
Obradoiro de Socioloxía/Público	7 Jan–12 Feb 2008	?	?	? 22/24	? 8/10	? 4	? 9/11	? 2	?
Celeste-Tel/Terra	22–28 Jan 2008	1,156	?	44.0– 45.0; 24/25	20.0– 21.0; 10	13.0– 14.0; 3	16.0– 17.0; 8/9	5.0– 6.0; 1	24.0
Obradoiro de Socioloxía/Público	20 Nov–21 Dec 2007	?	?	? 24	? 9	? 5	? 7	? 2	?
Noxa/La Vanguardia	22–25 Oct 2007	800	?	43.3; 23	19.8; 10	11.8; 6	15.3; 6	6.8; 2	23.5
GESOP/El Periódico	14 Oct 2007	?	?	38.7; 20	18.3; 9/10	14.2; 7/8	17.3; 8/9	? 2	20.4
GESOP/El Periódico	25–27 Jun 2007	?	?	41.5	20.6	11.8	16.1	6.0	20.9
GESOP/El Periódico	15–17 Apr 2007	800	?	42.2	20.0	11.8	15.7	6.1	22.2
Noxa/La Vanguardia	30 Jan–2 Feb 2006	400	?	44.0; 24	20.0; 10	13.5; 6	14.5; 5	? 2	24.0
Noxa/La Vanguardia	7–11 Nov 2005	400	?	43.5; 22	20.0; 10	12.5; 6	? 7	? 2	23.5
2004 EP election	13 Jun 2004	—N/a	39.8	42.9 (22)	17.4 (9)	11.8 (5)	17.8 (9)	7.2 (2)	25.1
2004 general election	14 Mar 2004	—N/a	76.0	39.5; 21	20.8; 10	15.9; 8	15.6; 6	5.8; 2	18.7

=== Extremadura ===
Polling firm/Commissioner	Fieldwork date	Sample size	Turnout	PSOE	PP	IU	Lead
2008 general election	9 Mar 2008	—N/a	78.5	52.3; 5	41.8; 5	2.9; 0	10.5
Sigma Dos/El Mundo	20 Feb–1 Mar 2008	?	?	49.0– 50.0; 5	44.0– 45.0; 5	–	5.0
Metroscopia/El País	8–27 Feb 2008	?	?	? 5	? 5	–	Tie
Celeste-Tel/Terra	22–28 Jan 2008	351	?	50.0– 51.0; 5	42.0– 43.0; 5	3.0– 4.0; 0	8.0
Obradoiro de Socioloxía/Público	20 Nov–21 Dec 2007	?	?	? 5	? 5	–	Tie
Opina/PSOE	25–29 Nov 2006	1,200	?	49.5; 5	43.2; 5	–	6.3
2004 EP election	13 Jun 2004	—N/a	49.5	52.2 (5)	43.2 (5)	2.6 (0)	9.0
2004 general election	14 Mar 2004	—N/a	79.3	51.2; 5	42.4; 5	3.5; 0	8.8

=== Galicia ===
Polling firm/Commissioner	Fieldwork date	Sample size	Turnout	PP	PSOE	BNG	IU	Lead
2008 general election	9 Mar 2008	—N/a	70.5	43.9; 11	40.6; 10	11.5; 2	1.4; 0	3.3
Sigma Dos/El Mundo	20 Feb–1 Mar 2008	?	?	45.0– 46.0; 11/13	38.0– 39.0; 9/10	9.0– 10.0; 0/2	–	7.0
Metroscopia/El País	8–27 Feb 2008	?	?	? 12	? 9	? 2	–	?
Celeste-Tel/Terra	22–28 Jan 2008	934	?	45.0– 46.0; 11	39.0– 40.0; 10	13.0– 14.0; 2	1.0– 2.0; 0	6.0
Obradoiro de Socioloxía/Público	20 Nov–21 Dec 2007	?	?	? 12	? 9	? 2	–	?
2004 EP election	13 Jun 2004	—N/a	44.3	47.7 (12)	36.2 (10)	12.3 (2)	1.5 (0)	11.5
2004 general election	14 Mar 2004	—N/a	71.0	47.1; 12	37.2; 10	11.4; 2	1.7; 0	9.9

=== La Rioja ===
Polling firm/Commissioner	Fieldwork date	Sample size	Turnout	PP	PSOE	IU	Lead
2008 general election	9 Mar 2008	—N/a	79.3	49.5; 2	43.6; 2	1.9; 0	5.9
Sigma Dos/El Mundo	20 Feb–1 Mar 2008	?	?	48.0– 49.0; 2	43.0– 44.0; 2	–	5.0
Metroscopia/El País	8–27 Feb 2008	?	?	? 2	? 2	–	Tie
Celeste-Tel/Terra	22–28 Jan 2008	142	?	51.0– 52.0; 2	42.0– 43.0; 2	3.0– 4.0; 0	9.0
Obradoiro de Socioloxía/Público	20 Nov–21 Dec 2007	?	?	? 2	? 2	–	Tie
2004 EP election	13 Jun 2004	—N/a	53.9	51.3 (2)	43.8 (2)	2.1 (0)	7.5
2004 general election	14 Mar 2004	—N/a	79.5	49.9; 2	44.0; 2	2.8; 0	5.9

=== Madrid ===
Polling firm/Commissioner	Fieldwork date	Sample size	Turnout	PP	PSOE	IU	UPyD	Lead
2008 general election	9 Mar 2008	—N/a	79.1	49.2; 18	39.7; 15	4.7; 1	3.7; 1	9.5
Sigma Dos/El Mundo	20 Feb–1 Mar 2008	?	?	47.0– 48.0; 17/18	42.0– 43.0; 15/16	6.0– 7.0; 2	2.0– 3.0; 0/1	5.0
Metroscopia/El País	8–27 Feb 2008	?	?	? 17/18	? 15	? 2	? 0/1	?
Celeste-Tel/Terra	22–28 Jan 2008	509	?	47.0– 48.0; 18	41.0– 42.0; 15/16	5.0– 6.0; 1/2	? 1	6.0
Obradoiro de Socioloxía/Público	20 Nov–21 Dec 2007	?	?	? 18	? 15	? 2	–	?
Synovate/PSOE	15 May 2005	1,012	?	43.9; 16	48.1; 17	6.7; 2	–	4.2
2004 EP election	13 Jun 2004	—N/a	49.2	49.5 (18)	42.9 (16)	5.1 (1)	–	6.6
2004 general election	14 Mar 2004	—N/a	78.9	45.0; 17	44.1; 16	6.4; 2	–	0.9

=== Murcia ===
Polling firm/Commissioner	Fieldwork date	Sample size	Turnout	PP	PSOE	IU	Lead
2008 general election	9 Mar 2008	—N/a	79.6	61.2; 7	32.9; 3	2.9; 0	28.3
Sigma Dos/El Mundo	20 Feb–1 Mar 2008	?	?	55.0– 56.0; 6	38.0– 39.0; 4	–	17.0
Metroscopia/El País	8–27 Feb 2008	?	?	? 6	? 4	–	?
Celeste-Tel/Terra	22–28 Jan 2008	257	?	59.0– 60.0; 6/7	33.0– 34.0; 3/4	4.0– 5.0; 0	26.0
Obradoiro de Socioloxía/Público	20 Nov–21 Dec 2007	?	?	? 6	? 4	–	?
2004 EP election	13 Jun 2004	—N/a	49.1	58.9 (6)	36.4 (3)	2.8 (0)	22.5
2004 general election	14 Mar 2004	—N/a	77.1	57.4; 6	35.0; 3	4.3; 0	22.4

=== Navarre ===
Polling firm/Commissioner	Fieldwork date	Sample size	Turnout	PP	PSOE	NaBai	IU	EA	Aralar	PNV	Lead
2008 general election	9 Mar 2008	—N/a	72.1	39.2; 2	34.8; 2	18.4; 1	3.3; 0	(Note: Within NaBai.)			4.4
Sigma Dos/El Mundo	20 Feb–1 Mar 2008	?	?	37.0– 38.0; 2	31.0– 32.0; 2	20.0– 21.0; 1	–				6.0
Metroscopia/El País	8–27 Feb 2008	?	?	? 2	? 2	? 1	–				Tie
Celeste-Tel/Terra	22–28 Jan 2008	229	?	37.0– 38.0; 2	33.0– 34.0; 2	20.0– 21.0; 1	5.0– 6.0; 1				4.0
Obradoiro de Socioloxía/Público	20 Nov–21 Dec 2007	?	?	? 2	? 2	? 1	–				Tie
2004 EP election	13 Jun 2004	—N/a	46.2	45.2 (3)	34.9 (2)	–	4.3 (0)	4.8 (0)	4.4 (0)	2.1 (0)	10.3
2004 general election	14 Mar 2004	—N/a	76.2	37.6; 2	33.6; 2	18.0; 1	5.9; 0				4.0

=== Valencian Community ===
Polling firm/Commissioner	Fieldwork date	Sample size	Turnout	PP	PSOE	IU	Bloc–EV	Lead
2008 general election	9 Mar 2008	—N/a	78.8	51.6; 19	41.0; 14	2.7; 0	1.1; 0	10.6
Sigma Dos/El Mundo	20 Feb–1 Mar 2008	?	?	49.0– 50.0; 18/19	43.0– 44.0; 14/15	3.0– 4.0; 0	–	6.0
Metroscopia/El País	8–27 Feb 2008	?	?	? 19	? 14	? 0	–	?
Celeste-Tel/Terra	22–28 Jan 2008	764	?	49.0– 50.0; 18/19	41.0– 42.0; 14/15	3.0– 4.0; 0/1	–	8.0
Obradoiro de Socioloxía/Público	20 Nov–21 Dec 2007	?	?	? 16	? 16	?1	–	Tie
Opina/El País	2–3 Oct 2006	1,200	?	47.0	41.5	5.3	1.7	5.5
Opina/El País	9 Oct 2005	?	?	46.8	42.4	4.8	0.9	4.4
2004 EP election	13 Jun 2004	—N/a	50.5	49.7 (18)	42.2 (14)	3.3 (0)	1.1 (0)	7.5
2004 general election	14 Mar 2004	—N/a	77.7	46.8; 17	42.4; 14	4.7; 1	1.5; 0	4.4
