= Europe of the Peoples–Greens =

Europe of the Peoples–Greens Europa de los Pueblos–Verdes
- Abbreviation: EdP–V
- Founded: 2009
- Dissolved: 2014
- Preceded by: Europe of the Peoples (2004); Galeusca–Peoples of Europe
- Succeeded by: The Left for the Right to Decide; The Peoples Decide
- Ideology: Peripheral nationalism

Europe of the Peoples–The Greens (Spanish: Europa de los Pueblos–Verdes, EdP–V) was a Spanish electoral alliance formed for the 2009 European Parliament election in Spain.

The alliance consisted of eleven parties, nine leftwing nationalist and two green. All member parties were allied with either the European Free Alliance or the European Greens. The program of the alliance emphasized multiculturalism, environmentalism, democratic reform, peace and a commitment to a social Europe.

The electoral support was enough to give the alliance one seat in the European Parliament: this was taken by Oriol Junqueras from the Catalan ERC. The MEP was expected to sit in the European Greens–European Free Alliance group in the European Parliament.

Junqueras stood down in 2012 and was replaced by Ana Miranda Paz of the Galician Nationalist Bloc.

== Composition ==
Party	Scope
Republican Left of Catalonia (ERC)	Catalonia, Balearic Islands, Valencian Community
Galician Nationalist Bloc (BNG)	Galicia
Aralar (Aralar)	Basque Country, Navarre
The Greens (LV)	—
Eusko Alkartasuna (EA)	Basque Country, Navarre
Aragonese Union (CHA)	Aragon
Agreement for Majorca (ExM)	Balearic Islands
Party of El Bierzo (PB)	Castile and León

== Electoral performance ==
=== European Parliament ===
European Parliament
Election	Vote	%	Seats
2009	394,938 (#6)	2.49	1 / 54
