= Democratic Convergence of La Franja =

Political party in Spain

Democratic Convergence of La Franja Convergència Democràtica de la Franja
- Secretary-General: Marta Canales
- Founded: February 2009, 09; 16 years ago
- Ideology: Liberalism; Catalan nationalism Franjolí Regionalism
- Political position: Centre-right
- National affiliation: Catalan European Democratic Party

Website
- www.cdfranja.cat

Democratic Convergence of La Franja (in Catalan: Convergència Democràtica de la Franja; CDF) is a catalanist and liberal political party active in the Catalan-speaking area of Aragon, known as La Franja.

== Objectives ==
CDF has two main objectives:

- Defence of the Catalan language and culture in La Franja.
- Improving the infraestrucure, social services and economy of La Franja.

== History ==
CDF was founded in 2009 by splitters of Alternativa Cívica, a local party in the municipality of Fraga. In the European elections of the same year the secretary-general of the party participated in the list of Democratic Convergence of Catalonia (CDC).

In the local elections of 2011 CDF gained 4 town councillors and 1 mayor, in Pont de Montanyana/Puente de Montañana. In the same elections, CDF gained the 7.8% of the vote in Arén, 16% in Sopeira, 2.29% in Benabarri/Benabarre and 3.28% in Fraga.

The party opposed the new Aragonese languages law of 2013, which they considered anti-Catalan.

CDF did not participate in the local elections of 2015.
