= Galeusca–Peoples of Europe =

Galeusca–Peoples of Europe Galeusca–Pueblos de Europa
- Abbreviation: GalEusCa
- Leader: Ignasi Guardans
- Founded: 2004
- Dissolved: 2009
- Preceded by: Nationalist Coalition–Europe of the Peoples
- Succeeded by: Coalition for Europe (2009); Europe of the Peoples–Greens
- Ideology: Peripheral nationalism
- European Parliament group: ALDE Group

Galeusca–Peoples of Europe (Spanish: Galeusca–Pueblos de Europa, GalEusCa) was a Spanish electoral list in the European Parliament election in 2004 made up from peripheral nationalism parties mainly from Galicia, the Basque Country and Catalonia, the coalition's name being a composite acronym of the three regions' names (Galicia, Euskadi and Catalonia).

== Composition ==
Party	Scope
Convergence and Union (CiU)	Catalonia
Basque Nationalist Party (EAJ/PNV)	Basque Country, Navarre
Galician Nationalist Bloc (BNG)	Galicia
Valencian Nationalist Bloc (BNV)	Valencian Community
PSM–Nationalist Agreement (PSM–EN)	Balearic Islands

== Electoral performance ==
=== European Parliament ===
European Parliament
Election	Vote	%	Score	Seats	+/–
2004	798,816	5.1	3rd	2 / 54	2
