= Europe of the Peoples (2004) =

Europe of the Peoples Europa de los Pueblos
- Founded: 2004
- Dissolved: 2009
- Preceded by: Nationalist Coalition–Europe of the Peoples
- Succeeded by: Europe of the Peoples–Greens
- Ideology: Peripheral nationalism

Europe of the Peoples (Spanish: Europa de los Pueblos, EdP) was a Spanish electoral list in the European Parliament election in 2004 made up from regionalist parties.

== Composition ==
Party	Scope
Republican Left of Catalonia (ERC)	Catalonia, Balearic Islands, Valencian Community
Basque Solidarity (EA)	Basque Country, Navarre
Aragonese Union (CHA)	Aragon
Socialist Party of Andalusia (PSA)	Andalusia
Left Assembly–Initiative for Andalusia (A–IZ)	Andalusia
Andecha Astur (AA)	Asturias
Cantabrian Nationalist Council (CNC)	Cantabria
Citizen Initiative of La Rioja (ICLR)	La Rioja

== Electoral performance ==
=== European Parliament ===
European Parliament
Election	Vote	%	Seats
2004	380,709 (#5)	2.45	1 / 54
