= The Greens–European Green Group =

The Greens–European Green Group Los Verdes–Grupo Verde Europeo
- Leader: Kristien Lesage
- Founded: 2009
- Ideology: Green politics

The Greens–European Green Group (Spanish: Los Verdes–Grupo Verde Europeo, LV–GVE) was a Spanish party alliance in the European Parliament election in 2009.

== Member parties ==
- The Greens–Green Group (LV–GV)
- The Greens–Ecologist Alternative (EV–AE)
- European Green Group (GVE)
- Greens of the Mediterranean (VM)
