= European Coalition (2004) =

European Coalition Coalición Europea
- Founded: 2004
- Preceded by: European Coalition (1999)
- Succeeded by: Coalition for Europe (2009)
- Ideology: Regionalism; Moderate nationalism
- Political position: Centre-left to centre-right

European Coalition (Spanish: Coalición Europea, CE) was a Spanish electoral list in the European Parliament election in 2004 made up from various regionalist and moderate nationalist parties. The coalition failed to gain any representation in the European Parliament.

== Composition ==
Party	Scope
Andalusian Party (PA)	Andalusia
Canarian Coalition (CC)	Canary Islands
Valencian Union (UV)	Valencian Community
Aragonese Party (PAR)	Aragon
Majorcan Union (UM)	Balearic Islands
Convergence of Democrats of Navarre (CDN)	Navarre
United Extremadura (EU)	Extremadura
Asturianist Party (PAS)	Asturias

== Electoral performance ==
=== European Parliament ===
European Parliament
Election	Vote	%	Seats
2004	197,231 (#6)	1.27	0 / 54
