= Peripheral nationalism =

Peripheral nationalism refers to the nationalist sentiments of some regions or territorial entities within a sovereign state, in occasions in conflict with the larger concept of the nation-state in which they reside, and trying to construct a minority social space. Peripheral nationalism is so called because the regions in which it exists are at the "periphery" as opposed to the "center" of the territory of the State.

Peripheral nationalism occurs in a culturally or linguistically distinctive territory — and oftentimes with a different socioeconomic degree of development — that resists incorporation or assimilation into an expanding State, or resists the larger Statewide nationalist construction. Existing theories of peripheral nationalism explain that the emergence of peripheral nationalism occurs in regions with a larger or greater degree of economic development in relation to the rest of the State, overlapping spatially delimited ethnic communities, as it is the case in the Basque Country or Catalonia in Spain, or Xinjiang in China. Peripheral nationalism may also emerge in opposition to the State seeking legitimacy through hegemony or domination by imposing a nationalistic sentiment which is then resisted by the smaller peripheral nationalisms, which defend their "cultural nation."

Even if the aim of peripheral nationalists is emancipation, their solution may not be the creation of a nation-state for themselves, in which case a federal solution is preferred, according with the concept of "regional pluralism" in opposition to monism or imperialism. Peripheral nationalisms may demand a recognition of the national identity of their own regions (i.e. their own existence as a "nation"). The existence of such nations may coexist within the State they belong to (e.g. by proposing the concept of a "nation composed of several nations" or a "nation of nations"), or they may defend their right to self-determination, secession, and the ability to create their own independent State.

== See also ==
- Local ethnic nationalism (China)
- Nationalities and regions of Spain
