= Results of the 2014 European Parliament election in Spain =

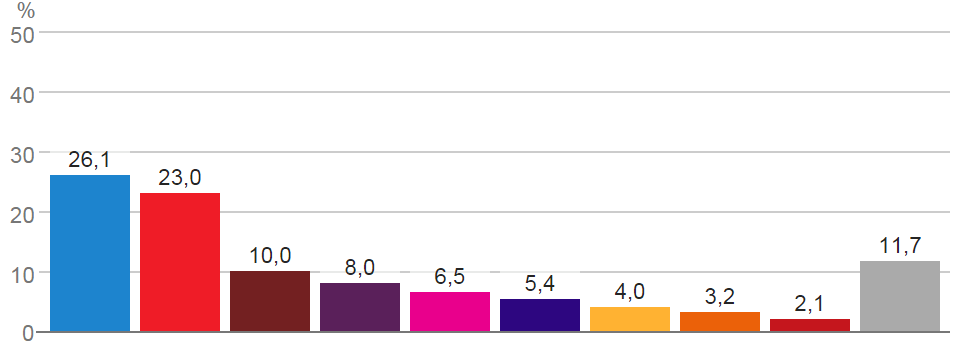
(Spain)	Main: 2014 European Parliament election in Spain
← 2009 25 May 2014 2019 →
Party		Votes	%	Seats
	PP	4,098,339	26.1%	16
	PSOE	3,614,232	23.0%	14
	IP	1,575,308	10.0%	6
	Podemos	1,253,837	8.0%	5
	UPyD	1,022,232	6.5%	4
	CEU	851,971	5.4%	3
	EPDD	630,072	4.0%	2
	C's	497,146	3.2%	2
	LPD	326,464	2.1%	1
	Others	1,840,615	11.7%	1
Total		15,710,216	100.0%	54

This article presents the results breakdown of the election to the European Parliament held in Spain on 25 May 2014. The following tables show detailed results in each of the country's 17 autonomous communities and in the autonomous cities of Ceuta and Melilla.

== Nationwide ==
← Summary of the 25 May 2014 European Parliament election results in Spain →
Parties and alliances	Popular vote			Seats	
Parties and alliances	Votes	%	±pp	Total	+/−
People's Party (PP)	4,098,339	26.09	−16.03	16	−8
Spanish Socialist Workers' Party (PSOE)	3,614,232	23.01	−15.77	14	−9
Plural Left (IP)^{1}	1,575,308	10.03	+6.32	6	+4
We Can (Podemos)	1,253,837	7.98	New	5	+5
Union, Progress and Democracy (UPyD)	1,022,232	6.51	+3.66	4	+3
Coalition for Europe (CEU)^{2}	851,971	5.42	+0.60	3	±0
The Left for the Right to Decide (EPDD)^{3}	630,072	4.01	+2.60	2	+1
Citizens–Party of the Citizenry (C's)^{4}	497,146	3.16	+3.02	2	+2
The Peoples Decide (LPD)^{5}	326,464	2.08	−0.06	1	+1
European Spring (PE)^{6}	302,266	1.92	+1.56	1	+1
Vox (Vox)	246,833	1.57	New	0	±0
Animalist Party Against Mistreatment of Animals (PACMA)	177,499	1.13	+0.87	0	±0
Blank Seats (EB)	115,682	0.74	New	0	±0
Citizens' Democratic Renewal Movement (RED)	105,666	0.67	New	0	±0
X Party, Party of the Future (Partido X)	100,561	0.64	New	0	±0
Andalusian Party (PA)^{7}	49,523	0.32	+0.15	0	±0
Pirate Confederation–European Pirates (Piratas)	38,690	0.25	New	0	±0
Asturias Forum (FAC)	32,962	0.21	New	0	±0
Electors' Group for the Disabled and Rare Diseases (DER)	32,833	0.21	New	0	±0
Zero Cuts (Recortes Cero)	30,827	0.20	New	0	±0
Communist Party of the Peoples of Spain (PCPE)	29,324	0.19	+0.09	0	±0
Feminist Initiative (IFem)	23,140	0.15	+0.09	0	±0
Spanish Phalanx of the CNSO (FE de las JONS)	21,687	0.14	+0.08	0	±0
United Free Citizens (CILUS)	18,287	0.12	New	0	±0
Social Impulse (Impulso Social)^{8}	17,879	0.11	−0.08	0	±0
Spain on the Move (LEM)	17,035	0.11	New	0	±0
Humanist Party (PH)	14,896	0.09	+0.05	0	±0
National Democracy (DN)	13,079	0.08	+0.02	0	±0
Europe Project (ACNV–BAR–PRAO–REPO–UNIO)	11,502	0.07	New	0	±0
Land Party (PT)	9,940	0.06	New	0	±0
Individual Freedom Party (P–LIB)	9,670	0.06	New	0	±0
Republican Social Movement (MSR)	8,909	0.06	+0.02	0	±0
United Extremadura (EU)	8,821	0.06	+0.03	0	±0
Republican Alternative (ALTER)	8,593	0.05	New	0	±0
For the Republic, for the Rupture with the European Union (RRUE)^{9}	8,309	0.05	−0.03	0	±0
Internationalist Solidarity and Self-Management (SAIn)	6,929	0.04	±0.00	0	±0
Regionalist Party of the Leonese Country (PREPAL)	6,759	0.04	+0.01	0	±0
Extremadurans for Europe (IPEx–PREx–CREx)	5,967	0.04	New	0	±0
Red Current Movement (MCR)	4,980	0.03	New	0	±0
Blank ballots	361,567	2.30	+0.91		
Total	15,710,216			54	±0
Valid votes	15,710,216	98.20	−1.18		
Invalid votes	287,925	1.80	+1.18		
Votes cast / turnout	15,998,141	43.81	−1.09		
Abstentions	20,515,943	56.19	+1.09		
Registered voters	36,514,084				
Sources
Footnotes: ^{1} Plural Left results are compared to United Left–Initiative for Catalonia Greens: The Left totals in the 2009 election.; ^{2} Coalition for Europe (2014) results are compared to Coalition for Europe (2009) totals in the 2009 election, not including results in Andalusia and the Valencian Community.; ^{3} The Left for the Right to Decide results are compared to Europe of the Peoples–Greens totals in the 2009 election, not including results in Aragon, the Basque Country, Galicia and Navarre.; ^{4} Citizens–Party of the Citizenry results are compared to Libertas–Citizens of Spain totals in the 2009 election.; ^{5} The Peoples Decide results are compared to the combined totals of Internationalist Initiative–Solidarity among Peoples, Europe of the Peoples–Greens in the Basque Country, Galicia and Navarre and Andecha Astur in the 2009 election.; ^{6} European Spring results are compared to the combined totals of Coalition for Europe in the Valencian Community, Europe of the Peoples–Greens in Aragon, and For a Fairer World in the 2009 election.; ^{7} Andalusian Party results are compared to Coalition for Europe totals in Andalusia in the 2009 election.; ^{8} Social Impulse results are compared to the combined totals of Spanish Alternative and Family and Life Party in the 2009 election.; ^{9} For the Republic, for the Rupture with the European Union results are compared to Internationalist Socialist Workers' Party totals in the 2009 election.

== Autonomous communities ==
=== Andalusia ===
← Summary of the 25 May 2014 European Parliament election results in Andalusia →
Parties and alliances	Popular vote		
Parties and alliances	Votes	%	±pp
Spanish Socialist Workers' Party (PSOE)	940,501	35.13	−13.03
People's Party (PP)	693,322	25.89	−13.76
United Left/The Greens–Assembly for Andalusia: Plural Left (IULV–CA)	311,201	11.62	+6.41
Union, Progress and Democracy (UPyD)	191,111	7.14	+4.60
We Can (Podemos)	190,465	7.11	New
Citizens–Party of the Citizenry (C's)^{1}	46,470	1.74	+1.64
Andalusian Party (PA)^{2}	45,462	1.70	+0.32
Vox (Vox)	32,407	1.21	New
European Spring (Equo–PUM+J–Participa)^{3}	25,556	0.95	+0.82
Animalist Party Against Mistreatment of Animals (PACMA)	25,025	0.93	+0.70
X Party, Party of the Future (Partido X)	18,482	0.69	New
Citizens' Democratic Renewal Movement (RED)	16,748	0.63	New
Blank Seats (EB)	15,008	0.56	New
Electors' Group for the Disabled and Rare Diseases (DER)	5,271	0.20	New
Communist Party of the Peoples of Spain (PCPE)	4,561	0.17	+0.07
Zero Cuts (Recortes Cero)	4,277	0.16	New
Pirate Confederation–European Pirates (Piratas)	4,065	0.15	New
Spanish Phalanx of the CNSO (FE de las JONS)	3,289	0.12	+0.07
Feminist Initiative (IFem)	3,138	0.12	+0.07
Asturias Forum (FAC)	2,687	0.10	New
United Free Citizens (CILUS)	2,552	0.10	New
Social Impulse (Impulso Social)^{4}	2,379	0.09	−0.03
The Peoples Decide (LPD)^{5}	2,184	0.08	−0.01
Humanist Party (PH)	2,072	0.08	+0.04
Spain on the Move (LEM)	2,042	0.08	New
National Democracy (DN)	1,677	0.06	+0.02
Regionalist Party for Eastern Andalusia–Europe Project (PRAO)	1,401	0.05	New
Republican Alternative (ALTER)	1,400	0.05	New
Individual Freedom Party (P–LIB)	1,380	0.05	New
For the Republic, for the Rupture with the European Union (RRUE)^{6}	1,333	0.05	−0.02
Republican Social Movement (MSR)	1,302	0.05	±0.00
Internationalist Solidarity and Self-Management (SAIn)	1,237	0.05	±0.00
Coalition for Europe (CEU)	1,111	0.04	New
Red Current Movement (MCR)	885	0.03	New
Republican Left–The Left for the Right to Decide (EPDD)	881	0.03	New
Land Party (PT)	802	0.03	New
Regionalist Party of the Leonese Country (PREPAL)	642	0.02	+0.01
United Extremadura (EU)	573	0.02	±0.00
Extremadurans for Europe (IPEx–PREx–CREx)	502	0.02	New
Blank ballots	72,046	2.69	+1.63
Total	2,677,447		
Valid votes	2,677,447	98.18	−1.34
Invalid votes	49,648	1.82	+1.34
Votes cast / turnout	2,727,095	41.85	+0.11
Abstentions	3,789,081	58.15	−0.11
Registered voters	6,516,176		
Sources
Footnotes: ^{1} Citizens–Party of the Citizenry results are compared to Libertas–Citizens of Spain totals in the 2009 election.; ^{2} Andalusian Party results are compared to the combined totals of Andalusian Party and Socialist Party of Andalusia in the 2009 election.; ^{3} European Spring results are compared to For a Fairer World totals in the 2009 election.; ^{4} Social Impulse results are compared to the combined totals of Spanish Alternative and Family and Life Party in the 2009 election.; ^{5} The Peoples Decide results are compared to the combined totals of Internationalist Initiative–Solidarity among Peoples and Andecha Astur in the 2009 election.; ^{6} For the Republic, for the Rupture with the European Union results are compared to Internationalist Socialist Workers' Party totals in the 2009 election.

=== Aragon ===
← Summary of the 25 May 2014 European Parliament election results in Aragon →
Parties and alliances	Popular vote		
Parties and alliances	Votes	%	±pp
People's Party (PP)	128,252	27.87	−13.82
Spanish Socialist Workers' Party (PSOE)	111,976	24.33	−19.63
We Can (Podemos)	43,896	9.54	New
United Left of Aragon: Plural Left (IUA)	43,326	9.41	+5.89
Union, Progress and Democracy (UPyD)	39,308	8.54	+5.36
Aragonese Union–Equo (European Spring) (CHA–eQuo)	20,703	4.50	+1.66
Citizens–Party of the Citizenry (C's)^{1}	13,431	2.92	+2.78
Vox (Vox)	10,749	2.34	New
Blank Seats (EB)	8,413	1.83	New
Animalist Party Against Mistreatment of Animals (PACMA)	5,567	1.21	+0.96
X Party, Party of the Future (Partido X)	5,058	1.10	New
Citizens' Democratic Renewal Movement (RED)	3,313	0.72	New
Puyalón de Cuchas (The Peoples Decide) (Puyalón)	1,241	0.27	New
Pirate Confederation–European Pirates (Piratas)	1,174	0.26	New
Zero Cuts (Recortes Cero)	1,012	0.22	New
Electors' Group for the Disabled and Rare Diseases (DER)	928	0.20	New
Spanish Phalanx of the CNSO (FE de las JONS)	889	0.19	+0.10
Communist Party of the Peoples of Spain (PCPE)	639	0.14	+0.05
Spain on the Move (LEM)	602	0.13	New
Aragonese Bloc–Europe Project (BAR)	517	0.11	New
Feminist Initiative (IFem)	498	0.11	+0.05
National Democracy (DN)	488	0.11	+0.02
Social Impulse (Impulso Social)^{2}	460	0.10	−0.12
Republican Left–The Left for the Right to Decide (EPDD)	457	0.10	New
Republican Social Movement (MSR)	440	0.10	+0.06
United Free Citizens (CILUS)	427	0.09	New
Asturias Forum (FAC)	419	0.09	New
Humanist Party (PH)	345	0.07	+0.03
Coalition for Europe (CEU)	321	0.07	−0.03
Individual Freedom Party (P–LIB)	279	0.06	New
For the Republic, for the Rupture with the European Union (RRUE)^{3}	217	0.05	−0.04
Republican Alternative (ALTER)	179	0.04	New
Regionalist Party of the Leonese Country (PREPAL)	143	0.03	+0.02
Land Party (PT)	140	0.03	New
Internationalist Solidarity and Self-Management (SAIn)	137	0.03	±0.00
United Extremadura (EU)	117	0.03	+0.01
Red Current Movement (MCR)	87	0.02	New
Andalusian Party (PA)	79	0.02	New
Extremadurans for Europe (IPEx–PREx–CREx)	72	0.02	New
Blank ballots	13,952	3.03	+1.06
Total	460,251		
Valid votes	460,251	98.24	−1.10
Invalid votes	8,260	1.76	+1.10
Votes cast / turnout	468,511	45.73	−0.71
Abstentions	555,991	54.27	+0.71
Registered voters	1,024,502		
Sources
Footnotes: ^{1} Citizens–Party of the Citizenry results are compared to Libertas–Citizens of Spain totals in the 2009 election.; ^{2} Social Impulse results are compared to the combined totals of Spanish Alternative and Family and Life Party in the 2009 election.; ^{3} For the Republic, for the Rupture with the European Union results are compared to Internationalist Socialist Workers' Party totals in the 2009 election.

=== Asturias ===
← Summary of the 25 May 2014 European Parliament election results in Asturias →
Parties and alliances	Popular vote		
Parties and alliances	Votes	%	±pp
Spanish Socialist Workers' Party (PSOE)	99,000	26.08	−17.97
People's Party (PP)	91,909	24.21	−17.79
We Can (Podemos)	51,778	13.64	New
United Left of Asturias: Plural Left (IU/IX)	48,985	12.90	+7.25
Union, Progress and Democracy (UPyD)	22,854	6.02	+1.91
Asturias Forum (FAC)	16,064	4.23	New
Citizens–Party of the Citizenry (C's)^{1}	9,444	2.49	+2.42
Blank Seats (EB)	5,302	1.40	New
Vox (Vox)	4,923	1.30	New
Animalist Party Against Mistreatment of Animals (PACMA)	3,831	1.01	+0.77
European Spring (Equo–PUM+J)^{2}	3,639	0.96	+0.85
Citizens' Democratic Renewal Movement (RED)	2,171	0.57	New
X Party, Party of the Future (Partido X)	1,653	0.44	New
Andecha Astur (The Peoples Decide) (Andecha Astur)	1,392	0.37	+0.18
Communist Party of the Peoples of Spain (PCPE)	879	0.23	+0.04
Zero Cuts (Recortes Cero)	690	0.18	New
Electors' Group for the Disabled and Rare Diseases (DER)	565	0.15	New
Pirate Confederation–European Pirates (Piratas)	535	0.14	New
United Free Citizens (CILUS)	442	0.12	New
Feminist Initiative (IFem)	402	0.11	+0.06
Spanish Phalanx of the CNSO (FE de las JONS)	370	0.10	+0.05
For the Republic, for the Rupture with the European Union (RRUE)^{3}	364	0.10	+0.04
National Democracy (DN)	307	0.08	−0.04
Humanist Party (PH)	267	0.07	+0.04
Social Impulse (Impulso Social)^{4}	262	0.07	−0.03
Spain on the Move (LEM)	240	0.06	New
Republican Alternative (ALTER)	240	0.06	New
Republican Social Movement (MSR)	217	0.06	+0.04
Regionalist Party of the Leonese Country (PREPAL)	196	0.05	+0.03
Individual Freedom Party (P–LIB)	194	0.05	New
Internationalist Solidarity and Self-Management (SAIn)	185	0.05	+0.01
Republican Left–The Left for the Right to Decide (EPDD)^{5}	146	0.04	−0.13
Land Party (PT)	145	0.04	New
Coalition for Europe (CEU)	133	0.04	+0.01
Red Current Movement (MCR)	94	0.02	New
Europe Project (ACNV–BAR–PRAO–REPO–UNIO)	80	0.02	New
United Extremadura (EU)	63	0.02	+0.01
Extremadurans for Europe (IPEx–PREx–CREx)	44	0.01	New
Andalusian Party (PA)	42	0.01	New
Blank ballots	9,609	2.53	+1.12
Total	379,656		
Valid votes	379,656	98.47	−0.90
Invalid votes	5,905	1.53	+0.90
Votes cast / turnout	385,561	38.97	−5.17
Abstentions	603,729	61.03	+5.17
Registered voters	989,290		
Sources
Footnotes: ^{1} Citizens–Party of the Citizenry results are compared to Libertas–Citizens of Spain totals in the 2009 election.; ^{2} European Spring results are compared to For a Fairer World totals in the 2009 election.; ^{3} For the Republic, for the Rupture with the European Union results are compared to Internationalist Socialist Workers' Party totals in the 2009 election.; ^{4} Social Impulse results are compared to the combined totals of Spanish Alternative and Family and Life Party in the 2009 election.; ^{5} Republican Left–The Left for the Right to Decide results are compared to Europe of the Peoples–Greens totals in the 2009 election.

=== Balearic Islands ===
← Summary of the 25 May 2014 European Parliament election results in the Balearic Islands →
Parties and alliances	Popular vote		
Parties and alliances	Votes	%	±pp
People's Party (PP)	74,223	27.48	−16.26
Spanish Socialist Workers' Party (PSOE)	59,518	22.03	−16.63
We Can (Podemos/Podem)	27,922	10.34	New
United Left of the Balearic Islands: Plural Left (EUIB)	23,928	8.86	+6.24
Republican Left–The Left for the Right to Decide (EPDD)^{1}	19,602	7.26	+4.29
Union, Progress and Democracy (UPyD)	18,076	6.69	+3.92
Citizens–Party of the Citizenry (C's)^{2}	6,198	2.29	+2.17
European Spring (Equo–Compromís–PUM+J)^{3}	5,576	2.06	+1.88
X Party, Party of the Future (Partido X)	4,974	1.84	New
Animalist Party Against Mistreatment of Animals (PACMA)	4,398	1.63	+1.28
Vox (Vox)	4,125	1.53	New
Blank Seats (EB)	2,963	1.10	New
Citizens' Democratic Renewal Movement (RED)	2,098	0.78	New
Coalition for Europe (CEU)^{4}	1,288	0.48	−3.33
The Peoples Decide (LPD)^{5}	924	0.34	−0.29
Pirate Confederation–European Pirates (Piratas)	790	0.29	New
Electors' Group for the Disabled and Rare Diseases (DER)	746	0.28	New
Feminist Initiative (IFem)	646	0.24	+0.17
Zero Cuts (Recortes Cero)	639	0.24	New
Communist Party of the Peoples of Spain (PCPE)	515	0.19	+0.09
Spanish Phalanx of the CNSO (FE de las JONS)	459	0.17	+0.08
Social Impulse (Impulso Social)^{6}	443	0.16	−0.09
Humanist Party (PH)	428	0.16	+0.10
United Free Citizens (CILUS)	402	0.15	New
Land Party (PT)	350	0.13	New
Asturias Forum (FAC)	345	0.13	New
Individual Freedom Party (P–LIB)	318	0.12	New
Spain on the Move (LEM)	261	0.10	New
United Extremadura (EU)	221	0.08	+0.06
National Democracy (DN)	220	0.08	+0.01
Republican Alternative (ALTER)	205	0.08	New
Andalusian Party (PA)	197	0.07	New
For the Republic, for the Rupture with the European Union (RRUE)^{7}	194	0.07	−0.03
Republican Social Movement (MSR)	166	0.06	+0.04
Europe Project (ACNV–BAR–PRAO–REPO–UNIO)	153	0.06	New
Regionalist Party of the Leonese Country (PREPAL)	107	0.04	+0.01
Red Current Movement (MCR)	94	0.03	New
Internationalist Solidarity and Self-Management (SAIn)	84	0.03	+0.01
Extremadurans for Europe (IPEx–PREx–CREx)	75	0.03	New
Blank ballots	6,269	2.32	+0.47
Total	270,140		
Valid votes	270,140	98.30	−0.88
Invalid votes	4,675	1.70	+0.88
Votes cast / turnout	274,815	35.60	−0.05
Abstentions	497,088	64.40	+0.05
Registered voters	771,903		
Sources
Footnotes: ^{1} Republican Left–The Left for the Right to Decide results are compared to Republican Left–Agreement (Europe of the Peoples–Greens) totals in the 2009 election.; ^{2} Citizens–Party of the Citizenry results are compared to Libertas–Citizens of Spain totals in the 2009 election.; ^{3} European Spring results are compared to For a Fairer World totals in the 2009 election.; ^{4} Coalition for Europe results are compared to Majorcan Union–Menorcan Union (Coalition for Europe) totals in the 2009 election.; ^{5} The Peoples Decide results are compared to the combined totals of Internationalist Initiative–Solidarity among Peoples and Andecha Astur in the 2009 election.; ^{6} Social Impulse results are compared to the combined totals of Family and Life Party and Spanish Alternative in the 2009 election.; ^{7} For the Republic, for the Rupture with the European Union results are compared to Internationalist Socialist Workers' Party totals in the 2009 election.

=== Basque Country ===
← Summary of the 25 May 2014 European Parliament election results in the Basque Country →
Parties and alliances	Popular vote		
Parties and alliances	Votes	%	±pp
Basque Nationalist Party (Coalition for Europe) (EAJ/PNV)	208,987	27.48	−1.06
Basque Country Gather (The Peoples Decide) (EH Bildu)^{1}	177,694	23.36	+1.73
Socialist Party of the Basque Country–Basque Country Left (PSE–EE (PSOE))	105,043	13.81	−13.97
People's Party (PP)	77,583	10.20	−5.83
We Can (Podemos/Ahal Dugu)	52,655	6.92	New
United Left–Awake: Plural Left (IU–EKI)	42,182	5.55	+3.74
Union, Progress and Democracy (UPyD)	25,064	3.30	+1.80
European Spring (Equo–PUM+J)^{2}	11,752	1.55	+1.34
Blank Seats (AZ/EB)	7,074	0.93	New
Animalist Party Against Mistreatment of Animals (PACMA/ATTKAA)	6,580	0.87	+0.65
Citizens–Party of the Citizenry (C's)^{3}	6,262	0.82	+0.75
Vox (Vox)	4,217	0.55	New
Citizens' Democratic Renewal Movement (RED)	4,068	0.53	New
X Party, Party of the Future (Partido X)	3,139	0.41	New
Zero Cuts (Recortes Cero)	2,065	0.27	New
Electors' Group for the Disabled and Rare Diseases (DER)	1,597	0.21	New
Pirate Confederation–European Pirates (Piratas)	1,485	0.20	New
Communist Party of the Peoples of Spain (PCPE)	1,144	0.15	+0.08
Feminist Initiative (IFem)	1,103	0.15	+0.06
Land Party (PT)	808	0.11	New
Asturias Forum (FAC)	791	0.10	New
Republican Left–The Left for the Right to Decide (EPDD)	785	0.10	New
United Free Citizens (CILUS)	657	0.09	New
Humanist Party (PH)	632	0.08	+0.05
Social Impulse (Impulso Social)^{4}	577	0.08	−0.05
For the Republic, for the Rupture with the European Union (RRUE)^{5}	473	0.06	−0.02
Republican Alternative (ALTER)	356	0.05	New
United Extremadura (EU)	355	0.05	+0.03
Individual Freedom Party (P–LIB)	331	0.04	New
Republican Social Movement (MSR)	317	0.04	+0.01
National Democracy (DN)	262	0.03	±0.00
Europe Project (ACNV–BAR–PRAO–REPO–UNIO)	249	0.03	New
Regionalist Party of the Leonese Country (PREPAL)	222	0.03	+0.01
Spanish Phalanx of the CNSO (FE de las JONS)	213	0.03	±0.00
Internationalist Solidarity and Self-Management (SAIn)	184	0.02	−0.02
Spain on the Move (LEM)	179	0.02	New
Red Current Movement (MCR)	179	0.02	New
Extremadurans for Europe (IPEx–PREx–CREx)	164	0.02	New
Andalusian Party (PA)	109	0.01	New
Blank ballots	13,014	1.71	+0.97
Total	760,551		
Valid votes	760,551	98.94	−0.68
Invalid votes	8,162	1.06	+0.68
Votes cast / turnout	768,713	43.10	+1.87
Abstentions	1,014,911	56.90	−1.87
Registered voters	1,783,624		
Sources
Footnotes: ^{1} Basque Country Gather (The Peoples Decide) results are compared to the combined totals of Internationalist Initiative–Solidarity among Peoples and Independentists and Leftists (Europe of the Peoples–Greens) in the 2009 election.; ^{2} European Spring results are compared to For a Fairer World totals in the 2009 election.; ^{3} Citizens–Party of the Citizenry results are compared to Libertas–Citizens of Spain totals in the 2009 election.; ^{4} Social Impulse results are compared to the combined totals of Family and Life Party and Spanish Alternative in the 2009 election.; ^{5} For the Republic, for the Rupture with the European Union results are compared to Internationalist Socialist Workers' Party totals in the 2009 election.

=== Canary Islands ===
← Summary of the 25 May 2014 European Parliament election results in the Canary Islands →
Parties and alliances	Popular vote		
Parties and alliances	Votes	%	±pp
People's Party (PP)	133,896	23.43	−17.35
Spanish Socialist Workers' Party (PSOE)	126,980	22.22	−13.80
Canarian Coalition–Canarian Nationalist Party (CEU) (CCa–PNC)	69,601	12.18	−3.66
We Can (Podemos)	62,795	10.99	New
Canarian United Left–The Greens: Plural Left (IUC–LV)	59,756	10.46	+8.87
Union, Progress and Democracy (UPyD)	39,485	6.91	+5.72
Animalist Party Against Mistreatment of Animals (PACMA)	10,599	1.85	+1.61
Citizens–Party of the Citizenry (C's)^{1}	8,042	1.41	+1.32
European Spring (Equo–PUM+J)^{2}	5,692	1.00	+0.83
Citizens' Democratic Renewal Movement (RED)	5,151	0.90	New
Blank Seats (EB)	4,837	0.85	New
Vox (Vox)	4,793	0.84	New
X Party, Party of the Future (Partido X)	4,655	0.81	New
Canarian Nationalist Alternative–Unity of the People (LPD) (ANC–UP)	3,424	0.60	New
Communist Party of the Peoples of Spain (PCPE)	1,848	0.32	+0.18
Zero Cuts (Recortes Cero)	1,727	0.30	New
Electors' Group for the Disabled and Rare Diseases (DER)	1,621	0.28	New
Feminist Initiative (IFem)	1,568	0.27	+0.17
Humanist Party (PH)	1,212	0.21	+0.14
Pirate Confederation–European Pirates (Piratas)	1,118	0.20	New
United Free Citizens (CILUS)	1.023	0.18	New
Asturias Forum (FAC)	934	0.16	New
Republican Left–The Left for the Right to Decide (EPDD)	663	0.12	New
Social Impulse (Impulso Social)^{3}	649	0.11	−0.06
Spanish Phalanx of the CNSO (FE de las JONS)	603	0.11	+0.07
Republican Alternative (ALTER)	591	0.10	New
Individual Freedom Party (P–LIB)	561	0.10	New
Spain on the Move (LEM)	509	0.09	New
National Democracy (DN)	508	0.09	+0.04
Land Party (PT)	499	0.09	New
Europe Project (ACNV–BAR–PRAO–REPO–UNIO)	441	0.08	New
For the Republic, for the Rupture with the European Union (RRUE)^{4}	430	0.08	−0.01
Internationalist Solidarity and Self-Management (SAIn)	424	0.07	+0.01
Regionalist Party of the Leonese Country (PREPAL)	420	0.07	+0.05
Red Current Movement (MCR)	344	0.06	New
Republican Social Movement (MSR)	339	0.06	+0.01
United Extremadura (EU)	211	0.04	+0.02
Andalusian Party (PA)	203	0.04	New
Extremadurans for Europe (IPEx–PREx–CREx)	185	0.03	New
Blank ballots	13,049	2.28	+0.98
Total	571,386		
Valid votes	571,386	97.84	−1.47
Invalid votes	12,594	2.16	+1.47
Votes cast / turnout	583,980	34.96	−4.27
Abstentions	1,086,213	65.04	+4.27
Registered voters	1,670,193		
Sources
Footnotes: ^{1} Citizens–Party of the Citizenry results are compared to Libertas–Citizens of Spain totals in the 2009 election.; ^{2} European Spring results are compared to For a Fairer World totals in the 2009 election.; ^{3} Social Impulse results are compared to the combined totals of Spanish Alternative and Family and Life Party in the 2009 election.; ^{4} For the Republic, for the Rupture with the European Union results are compared to Internationalist Socialist Workers' Party totals in the 2009 election.

=== Cantabria ===
← Summary of the 25 May 2014 European Parliament election results in Cantabria →
Parties and alliances	Popular vote		
Parties and alliances	Votes	%	±pp
People's Party (PP)	74,606	34.72	−16.00
Spanish Socialist Workers' Party (PSOE)	52,250	24.31	−15.60
We Can (Podemos)	19,785	9.21	New
United Left of Cantabria: Plural Left (IUC)	19,293	8.98	+6.99
Union, Progress and Democracy (UPyD)	17,577	8.18	+4.95
Citizens–Party of the Citizenry (C's)^{1}	6,442	3.00	+2.90
Vox (Vox)	3,861	1.80	New
European Spring (Equo–PUM+J)^{2}	2,800	1.30	+1.19
Animalist Party Against Mistreatment of Animals (PACMA)	2,393	1.11	+0.89
Citizens' Democratic Renewal Movement (RED)	1,603	0.75	New
Blank Seats (EB)	1,583	0.74	New
X Party, Party of the Future (Partido X)	1,187	0.55	New
Communist Party of the Peoples of Spain (PCPE)	485	0.23	+0.12
The Peoples Decide (LPD)^{3}	471	0.22	+0.01
Asturias Forum (FAC)	437	0.20	New
Electors' Group for the Disabled and Rare Diseases (DER)	415	0.19	New
Social Impulse (Impulso Social)^{4}	386	0.18	+0.03
Coalition for Europe (CEU)	370	0.17	+0.03
Spanish Phalanx of the CNSO (FE de las JONS)	361	0.17	+0.08
Zero Cuts (Recortes Cero)	357	0.17	New
Pirate Confederation–European Pirates (Piratas)	345	0.16	New
Feminist Initiative (IFem)	315	0.15	+0.07
United Free Citizens (CILUS)	268	0.12	New
Humanist Party (PH)	219	0.10	+0.06
Spain on the Move (LEM)	219	0.10	New
Internationalist Solidarity and Self-Management (SAIn)	209	0.10	+0.02
National Democracy (DN)	187	0.09	+0.05
Republican Alternative (ALTER)	150	0.07	New
For the Republic, for the Rupture with the European Union (RRUE)^{5}	143	0.07	+0.02
Individual Freedom Party (P–LIB)	141	0.07	New
Land Party (PT)	122	0.06	New
Republican Social Movement (MSR)	100	0.05	+0.02
Republican Left–The Left for the Right to Decide (EPDD)	99	0.05	New
Regionalist Party of the Leonese Country (PREPAL)	86	0.04	+0.02
Europe Project (ACNV–BAR–PRAO–REPO–UNIO)	82	0.04	New
United Extremadura (EU)	63	0.03	+0.01
Red Current Movement (MCR)	48	0.02	New
Extremadurans for Europe (IPEx–PREx–CREx)	36	0.02	New
Andalusian Party (PA)	32	0.01	New
Blank ballots	5,373	2.50	+1.08
Total	214,899		
Valid votes	214,899	97.32	−1.86
Invalid votes	5,910	2.68	+1.86
Votes cast / turnout	220,809	44.10	−6.69
Abstentions	279,900	55.90	+6.69
Registered voters	500,709		
Sources
Footnotes: ^{1} Citizens–Party of the Citizenry results are compared to Libertas–Citizens of Spain totals in the 2009 election.; ^{2} European Spring results are compared to For a Fairer World totals in the 2009 election.; ^{3} The Peoples Decide results are compared to the combined totals of Internationalist Initiative–Solidarity among Peoples and Andecha Astur in the 2009 election.; ^{4} Social Impulse results are compared to the combined totals of Spanish Alternative and Family and Life Party in the 2009 election.; ^{5} For the Republic, for the Rupture with the European Union results are compared to Internationalist Socialist Workers' Party totals in the 2009 election.

=== Castile and León ===
← Summary of the 25 May 2014 European Parliament election results in Castile and León →
Parties and alliances	Popular vote		
Parties and alliances	Votes	%	±pp
People's Party (PP)	362,223	37.51	−14.18
Spanish Socialist Workers' Party (PSOE)	225,615	23.37	−14.84
Union, Progress and Democracy (UPyD)	80,370	8.32	+4.66
United Left of Castile and León: Plural Left (IUCyL)	80,081	8.29	+5.95
We Can (Podemos)	78,673	8.15	New
Citizens–Party of the Citizenry (C's)^{1}	25,745	2.67	+2.52
Vox (Vox)	24,082	2.49	New
European Spring (Equo–PCAS–PUM+J)^{2}	8,721	0.90	+0.76
Animalist Party Against Mistreatment of Animals (PACMA)	7,007	0.73	+0.53
Citizens' Democratic Renewal Movement (RED)	5,907	0.61	New
Blank Seats (EB)	5,697	0.59	New
X Party, Party of the Future (Partido X)	4,389	0.45	New
Regionalist Party of the Leonese Country (PREPAL)	2,294	0.24	+0.03
Asturias Forum (FAC)	2,285	0.24	New
Electors' Group for the Disabled and Rare Diseases (DER)	1,902	0.20	New
Spanish Phalanx of the CNSO (FE de las JONS)	1,680	0.17	+0.09
Pirate Confederation–European Pirates (Piratas)	1,552	0.16	New
Communist Party of the Peoples of Spain (PCPE)	1,454	0.15	+0.07
National Democracy (DN)	1,447	0.15	+0.04
Zero Cuts (Recortes Cero)	1,403	0.15	New
Feminist Initiative (IFem)	1,377	0.14	+0.08
The Peoples Decide (LPD)^{3}	1,358	0.14	−0.05
United Free Citizens (CILUS)	1,196	0.12	New
Spain on the Move (LEM)	1,111	0.12	New
Social Impulse (Impulso Social)^{4}	947	0.10	−0.04
Humanist Party (PH)	860	0.09	+0.05
Internationalist Solidarity and Self-Management (SAIn)	843	0.09	+0.02
Coalition for Europe (CEU)	825	0.09	+0.06
Republican Social Movement (MSR)	564	0.06	+0.03
Individual Freedom Party (P–LIB)	526	0.05	New
Republican Alternative (ALTER)	472	0.05	New
For the Republic, for the Rupture with the European Union (RRUE)^{5}	470	0.05	−0.02
Land Party (PT)	467	0.05	New
Republican Left–The Left for the Right to Decide (EPDD)	408	0.04	New
Europe Project (ACNV–BAR–PRAO–REPO–UNIO)	327	0.03	New
Red Current Movement (MCR)	259	0.03	New
Extremadurans for Europe (IPEx–PREx–CREx)	223	0.02	New
United Extremadura (EU)	222	0.02	±0.00
Andalusian Party (PA)	190	0.02	New
Blank ballots	30,383	3.15	+1.70
Total	965,555		
Valid votes	965,555	97.48	−1.74
Invalid votes	25,007	2.52	+1.74
Votes cast / turnout	990,562	45.92	−5.50
Abstentions	1,166,428	54.08	+5.50
Registered voters	2,156,990		
Sources
Footnotes: ^{1} Citizens–Party of the Citizenry results are compared to Libertas–Citizens of Spain totals in the 2009 election.; ^{2} European Spring results are compared to For a Fairer World totals in the 2009 election.; ^{3} The Peoples Decide results are compared to the combined totals of Internationalist Initiative–Solidarity among Peoples and Andecha Astur in the 2009 election.; ^{4} Social Impulse results are compared to the combined totals of Spanish Alternative and Family and Life Party in the 2009 election.; ^{5} For the Republic, for the Rupture with the European Union results are compared to Internationalist Socialist Workers' Party totals in the 2009 election.

=== Castilla–La Mancha ===
← Summary of the 25 May 2014 European Parliament election results in Castilla–La Mancha →
Parties and alliances	Popular vote		
Parties and alliances	Votes	%	±pp
People's Party (PP)	269,526	37.73	−13.72
Spanish Socialist Workers' Party (PSOE)	205,473	28.76	−11.17
United Left of Castilla–La Mancha–The Greens: Plural Left (IUCLM–LV)	61,961	8.67	+5.67
Union, Progress and Democracy (UPyD)	51,441	7.20	+4.58
We Can (Podemos)	45,401	6.35	New
Citizens–Party of the Citizenry (C's)^{1}	15,883	2.22	+2.14
Vox (Vox)	10,451	1.46	New
Animalist Party Against Mistreatment of Animals (PACMA)	6,635	0.93	+0.74
European Spring (Equo–PCAS–PUM+J)^{2}	5,722	0.80	+0.69
Citizens' Democratic Renewal Movement (RED)	3,760	0.53	New
X Party, Party of the Future (Partido X)	3,294	0.46	New
Blank Seats (EB)	3,222	0.45	New
Spanish Phalanx of the CNSO (FE de las JONS)	1,406	0.20	+0.12
Electors' Group for the Disabled and Rare Diseases (DER)	1,188	0.17	New
Communist Party of the Peoples of Spain (PCPE)	1,054	0.15	+0.08
Spain on the Move (LEM)	1,051	0.15	New
Zero Cuts (Recortes Cero)	992	0.14	New
Feminist Initiative (IFem)	916	0.13	+0.09
Pirate Confederation–European Pirates (Piratas)	857	0.12	New
Social Impulse (Impulso Social)^{3}	826	0.12	−0.04
National Democracy (DN)	781	0.11	+0.06
United Free Citizens (CILUS)	717	0.10	New
Asturias Forum (FAC)	617	0.09	New
Humanist Party (PH)	602	0.08	+0.05
The Peoples Decide (LPD)^{4}	529	0.07	±0.00
Coalition for Europe (CEU)	484	0.07	+0.05
Republican Social Movement (MSR)	432	0.06	+0.04
For the Republic, for the Rupture with the European Union (RRUE)^{5}	403	0.06	+0.01
Individual Freedom Party (P–LIB)	375	0.05	New
Republican Alternative (ALTER)	323	0.05	New
Land Party (PT)	274	0.04	New
United Extremadura (EU)	250	0.03	+0.01
Republican Left–The Left for the Right to Decide (EPDD)	241	0.03	New
Europe Project (ACNV–BAR–PRAO–REPO–UNIO)	195	0.03	New
Extremadurans for Europe (IPEx–PREx–CREx)	190	0.03	New
Regionalist Party of the Leonese Country (PREPAL)	182	0.03	+0.02
Andalusian Party (PA)	174	0.02	New
Internationalist Solidarity and Self-Management (SAIn)	166	0.02	+0.01
Red Current Movement (MCR)	139	0.02	New
Blank ballots	16,293	2.28	+1.14
Total	714,426		
Valid votes	714,426	97.38	−1.82
Invalid votes	19,222	2.62	+1.82
Votes cast / turnout	733,648	46.43	−5.28
Abstentions	846,445	53.57	+5.28
Registered voters	1,580,093		
Sources
Footnotes: ^{1} Citizens–Party of the Citizenry results are compared to Libertas–Citizens of Spain totals in the 2009 election.; ^{2} European Spring results are compared to For a Fairer World totals in the 2009 election.; ^{3} Social Impulse results are compared to the combined totals of Spanish Alternative and Family and Life Party in the 2009 election.; ^{4} The Peoples Decide results are compared to the combined totals of Internationalist Initiative–Solidarity among Peoples and Andecha Astur in the 2009 election.; ^{5} For the Republic, for the Rupture with the European Union results are compared to Internationalist Socialist Workers' Party totals in the 2009 election.

=== Catalonia ===
← Summary of the 25 May 2014 European Parliament election results in Catalonia →
Parties and alliances	Popular vote		
Parties and alliances	Votes	%	±pp
Republican Left–New Catalan Left–Catalonia Yes (EPDD) (ERC–NECat–CatSí)	595,493	23.69	+14.49
Convergence and Union (Coalition for Europe) (CiU)	549,096	21.84	−0.60
Socialists' Party of Catalonia (PSC–PSOE)	359,214	14.29	−21.71
Initiative for Catalonia Greens–United and Alternative Left: IP (ICV–EUiA)	259,152	10.31	+4.23
People's Party (PP)	246,698	9.81	−8.21
Citizens–Party of the Citizenry (C's)^{1}	157,948	6.28	+5.92
We Can (Podemos/Podem)	116,996	4.65	New
Union, Progress and Democracy (UPyD)	32,686	1.30	+0.50
Animalist Party Against Mistreatment of Animals (PACMA)	32,022	1.27	+0.72
Blank Seats (EB)	19,439	0.77	New
Citizens' Democratic Renewal Movement (RED)	13,674	0.54	New
X Party, Party of the Future (Partido X)	12,591	0.50	New
Pirates of Catalonia: European Pirates (Pirata.cat)	11,480	0.46	New
European Spring (Equo–Compromís–SIEx–PUM+J–Participa)^{2}	7,919	0.32	+0.17
Vox (Vox)	7,854	0.31	New
The Peoples Decide (LPD)^{3}	7,248	0.29	−0.57
Electors' Group for the Disabled and Rare Diseases (DER)	4,402	0.18	New
Communist Party of the Peoples of Spain (PCPE)	4,296	0.17	+0.03
Zero Cuts (Recortes Cero)	4,197	0.17	New
Feminist Initiative (IFem)	3,728	0.15	+0.06
United Free Citizens (CILUS)	3,160	0.13	New
Spanish Phalanx of the CNSO (FE de las JONS)	1,992	0.08	+0.01
Social Impulse (Impulso Social)^{4}	1,833	0.07	−0.08
Humanist Party (PH)	1,786	0.07	+0.02
Spain on the Move (LEM)	1,582	0.06	New
Asturias Forum (FAC)	1,549	0.06	New
National Democracy (DN)	1,321	0.05	−0.01
Land Party (PT)	1,148	0.05	New
Andalusian Party (PA)	1,129	0.04	New
United Extremadura (EU)	1,112	0.04	+0.01
Republican Alternative (ALTER)	1,084	0.04	New
For the Republic, for the Rupture with the European Union (RRUE)^{5}	1,052	0.04	−0.12
Individual Freedom Party (P–LIB)	1,049	0.04	New
Republican Social Movement (MSR)	1,025	0.04	+0.01
Red Current Movement (MCR)	773	0.03	New
Europe Project (ACNV–BAR–PRAO–REPO–UNIO)	657	0.03	New
Extremadurans for Europe (IPEx–PREx–CREx)	610	0.02	New
Regionalist Party of the Leonese Country (PREPAL)	596	0.02	±0.00
Internationalist Solidarity and Self-Management (SAIn)	483	0.02	−0.01
Blank ballots	43,554	1.73	−1.18
Total	2,513,628		
Valid votes	2,513,628	99.11	−0.13
Invalid votes	22,524	0.89	+0.13
Votes cast / turnout	2,536,152	46.18	+9.24
Abstentions	2,956,145	53.82	−9.24
Registered voters	5,492,297		
Sources
Footnotes: ^{1} Citizens–Party of the Citizenry results are compared to Libertas–Citizens of Spain totals in the 2009 election.; ^{2} European Spring results are compared to For a Fairer World totals in the 2009 election.; ^{3} The Peoples Decide results are compared to the combined totals of Internationalist Initiative–Solidarity among Peoples and Andecha Astur in the 2009 election.; ^{4} Social Impulse results are compared to the combined totals of Family and Life Party and Spanish Alternative in the 2009 election.; ^{5} For the Republic, for the Rupture with the European Union results are compared to Internationalist Socialist Workers' Party totals in the 2009 election.

=== Extremadura ===
← Summary of the 25 May 2014 European Parliament election results in Extremadura →
Parties and alliances	Popular vote		
Parties and alliances	Votes	%	±pp
Spanish Socialist Workers' Party (PSOE)	151,738	38.72	−9.87
People's Party (PP)	139,404	35.57	−8.56
United Left–Greens–Commitment to Extremadura: Plural Left (IU–V–CE)	24,682	6.30	+3.76
Union, Progress and Democracy (UPyD)	21,380	5.46	+3.60
We Can (Podemos)	18,828	4.80	New
Citizens–Party of the Citizenry (C's)^{1}	3,853	0.98	+0.89
Vox (Vox)	3,793	0.97	New
Animalist Party Against Mistreatment of Animals (PACMA)	2,555	0.65	+0.53
United Extremadura (EU)	2,464	0.63	+0.25
European Spring (Equo–SIEx–PUM+J)^{2}	2,295	0.59	+0.45
Extremadurans for Europe (IPEx–PREx–CREx)	2,114	0.54	New
X Party, Party of the Future (Partido X)	1,582	0.40	New
Blank Seats (EB)	1,557	0.40	New
Citizens' Democratic Renewal Movement (RED)	1,534	0.39	New
Pirate Confederation–European Pirates (Piratas)	568	0.14	New
Communist Party of the Peoples of Spain (PCPE)	518	0.13	+0.05
Electors' Group for the Disabled and Rare Diseases (DER)	481	0.12	New
Feminist Initiative (IFem)	453	0.12	+0.09
Spanish Phalanx of the CNSO (FE de las JONS)	401	0.10	+0.05
Zero Cuts (Recortes Cero)	383	0.10	New
Asturias Forum (FAC)	290	0.07	New
Humanist Party (PH)	270	0.07	+0.04
United Free Citizens (CILUS)	270	0.07	New
Spain on the Move (LEM)	241	0.06	New
The Peoples Decide (LPD)^{3}	229	0.06	±0.00
Social Impulse (Impulso Social)^{4}	201	0.05	−0.02
For the Republic, for the Rupture with the European Union (RRUE)^{5}	194	0.05	−0.02
Republican Social Movement (MSR)	187	0.05	+0.03
National Democracy (DN)	181	0.05	+0.01
Individual Freedom Party (P–LIB)	148	0.04	New
Republican Alternative (ALTER)	148	0.04	New
Red Current Movement (MCR)	122	0.03	New
Land Party (PT)	121	0.03	New
Coalition for Europe (CEU)	117	0.03	+0.01
Europe Project (ACNV–BAR–PRAO–REPO–UNIO)	109	0.03	New
Internationalist Solidarity and Self-Management (SAIn)	101	0.03	+0.02
Republican Left–The Left for the Right to Decide (EPDD)	101	0.03	New
Andalusian Party (PA)	68	0.02	New
Regionalist Party of the Leonese Country (PREPAL)	57	0.01	±0.00
Blank ballots	8,162	2.08	+1.09
Total	391,900		
Valid votes	391,900	97.50	−1.79
Invalid votes	10,039	2.50	+1.79
Votes cast / turnout	401,939	44.13	−6.44
Abstentions	508,783	55.87	+6.44
Registered voters	910,722		
Sources
Footnotes: ^{1} Citizens–Party of the Citizenry results are compared to Libertas–Citizens of Spain totals in the 2009 election.; ^{2} European Spring results are compared to For a Fairer World totals in the 2009 election.; ^{3} The Peoples Decide results are compared to the combined totals of Internationalist Initiative–Solidarity among Peoples and Andecha Astur in the 2009 election.; ^{4} Social Impulse results are compared to the combined totals of Spanish Alternative and Family and Life Party in the 2009 election.; ^{5} For the Republic, for the Rupture with the European Union results are compared to Internationalist Socialist Workers' Party totals in the 2009 election.

=== Galicia ===
← Summary of the 25 May 2014 European Parliament election results in Galicia →
Parties and alliances	Popular vote		
Parties and alliances	Votes	%	±pp
People's Party (PP)	359,068	35.19	−14.82
Socialists' Party of Galicia (PSdeG–PSOE)	222,195	21.78	−13.51
Galician Left Alternative in Europe: Plural Left (AGE)^{1}	107,095	10.50	+9.19
We Can (Podemos)	85,193	8.35	New
Galician Nationalist Bloc (The Peoples Decide) (BNG)^{2}	80,394	7.88	−1.50
Union, Progress and Democracy (UPyD)	35,445	3.47	+2.23
Citizens–Party of the Citizenry (C's)^{3}	16,484	1.62	+1.54
Animalist Party Against Mistreatment of Animals (PACMA)	11,125	1.09	+0.86
Commitment to Galicia (Coalition for Europe) (CxG)	9,812	0.96	New
Blank Seats (EB)	7,999	0.78	New
Vox (Vox)	7,898	0.77	New
Citizens' Democratic Renewal Movement (RED)	7,621	0.75	New
European Spring (Equo–PUM+J)^{4}	7,052	0.69	+0.55
X Party, Party of the Future (Partido X)	5,054	0.50	New
Pirate Confederation–European Pirates (Piratas)	3,349	0.33	New
Zero Cuts (Recortes Cero)	2,468	0.24	New
Communist Party of the Peoples of Spain (PCPE)	2,274	0.22	+0.17
Land Party (PT)	2,232	0.22	New
Electors' Group for the Disabled and Rare Diseases (DER)	2,063	0.20	New
Feminist Initiative (IFem)	1,768	0.17	+0.12
Asturias Forum (FAC)	1,379	0.14	New
United Free Citizens (CILUS)	1,317	0.13	New
Humanist Party (PH)	1,300	0.13	+0.07
Republican Left–The Left for the Right to Decide (EPDD)	1,068	0.10	New
Spanish Phalanx of the CNSO (FE de las JONS)	1,017	0.10	+0.05
Republican Alternative (ALTER)	874	0.09	New
Social Impulse (Impulso Social)^{5}	750	0.07	+0.01
National Democracy (DN)	732	0.07	+0.04
Individual Freedom Party (P–LIB)	687	0.07	New
Spain on the Move (LEM)	682	0.07	New
For the Republic, for the Rupture with the European Union (RRUE)^{6}	644	0.06	−0.02
Internationalist Solidarity and Self-Management (SAIn)	612	0.06	+0.03
Republican Social Movement (MSR)	559	0.05	+0.01
Europe Project (ACNV–BAR–PRAO–REPO–UNIO)	440	0.04	New
Red Current Movement (MCR)	418	0.04	New
United Extremadura (EU)	292	0.03	+0.02
Regionalist Party of the Leonese Country (PREPAL)	276	0.03	+0.02
Extremadurans for Europe (IPEx–PREx–CREx)	255	0.02	New
Andalusian Party (PA)	238	0.02	New
Blank ballots	30,126	2.95	+1.85
Total	1,020,255		
Valid votes	1,020,255	97.43	−1.91
Invalid votes	26,870	2.57	+1.91
Votes cast / turnout	1,047,125	38.67	−4.67
Abstentions	1,660,979	61.33	+4.67
Registered voters	2,708,104		
Sources
Footnotes: ^{1} Galician Left Alternative: Plural Left results are compared to United Left: The Left totals in the 2009 election.; ^{2} Galician Nationalist Bloc (The Peoples Decide) results are compared to the combined totals of Galician Nationalist Bloc and Internationalist Initiative–Solidarity among Peoples totals in the 2009 election.; ^{3} Citizens–Party of the Citizenry results are compared to Libertas–Citizens of Spain totals in the 2009 election.; ^{4} European Spring results are compared to For a Fairer World totals in the 2009 election.; ^{5} Social Impulse results are compared to the combined totals of Family and Life Party and Spanish Alternative in the 2009 election.; ^{6} For the Republic, for the Rupture with the European Union results are compared to Internationalist Socialist Workers' Party totals in the 2009 election.

=== La Rioja ===
← Summary of the 25 May 2014 European Parliament election results in La Rioja →
Parties and alliances	Popular vote		
Parties and alliances	Votes	%	±pp
People's Party (PP)	44,093	38.45	−12.22
Spanish Socialist Workers' Party (PSOE)	27,166	23.69	−16.87
Union, Progress and Democracy (UPyD)	10,321	9.00	+6.02
United Left–The Greens: Plural Left (IU–LV)	9,324	8.13	+6.26
We Can (Podemos)	8,598	7.50	New
Citizens–Party of the Citizenry (C's)^{1}	2,593	2.26	+2.17
Vox (Vox)	1,595	1.39	New
European Spring (Equo–PUM+J)^{2}	1,493	1.30	+1.16
Blank Seats (EB)	938	0.82	New
Animalist Party Against Mistreatment of Animals (PACMA)	867	0.76	+0.57
Citizens' Democratic Renewal Movement (RED)	866	0.76	New
X Party, Party of the Future (Partido X)	633	0.55	New
Communist Party of the Peoples of Spain (PCPE)	281	0.25	+0.12
Electors' Group for the Disabled and Rare Diseases (DER)	237	0.21	New
Pirate Confederation–European Pirates (Piratas)	235	0.20	New
The Peoples Decide (LPD)^{3}	212	0.18	−0.02
Social Impulse (Impulso Social)^{4}	209	0.18	+0.01
Zero Cuts (Recortes Cero)	188	0.16	New
United Free Citizens (CILUS)	165	0.14	New
Feminist Initiative (IFem)	165	0.14	+0.10
Spanish Phalanx of the CNSO (FE de las JONS)	150	0.13	+0.07
Coalition for Europe (CEU)	135	0.12	+0.02
Asturias Forum (FAC)	112	0.10	New
Spain on the Move (LEM)	103	0.09	New
National Democracy (DN)	81	0.07	±0.00
Republican Left–The Left for the Right to Decide (EPDD)	81	0.07	New
Republican Social Movement (MSR)	71	0.06	+0.03
Individual Freedom Party (P–LIB)	64	0.06	New
Humanist Party (PH)	64	0.06	+0.03
For the Republic, for the Rupture with the European Union (RRUE)^{5}	54	0.05	−0.10
Red Current Movement (MCR)	47	0.04	New
Republican Alternative (ALTER)	46	0.04	New
Europe Project (ACNV–BAR–PRAO–REPO–UNIO)	43	0.04	New
Land Party (PT)	42	0.04	New
United Extremadura (EU)	37	0.03	+0.01
Regionalist Party of the Leonese Country (PREPAL)	35	0.03	+0.01
Internationalist Solidarity and Self-Management (SAIn)	27	0.02	+0.01
Andalusian Party (PA)	25	0.02	New
Extremadurans for Europe (IPEx–PREx–CREx)	22	0.02	New
Blank ballots	3,263	2.85	+1.43
Total	114,681		
Valid votes	114,681	97.32	−1.93
Invalid votes	3,158	2.68	+1.93
Votes cast / turnout	117,839	47.54	−2.83
Abstentions	130,019	52.46	+2.83
Registered voters	247,858		
Sources
Footnotes: ^{1} Citizens–Party of the Citizenry results are compared to Libertas–Citizens of Spain totals in the 2009 election.; ^{2} European Spring results are compared to For a Fairer World totals in the 2009 election.; ^{3} The Peoples Decide results are compared to the combined totals of Internationalist Initiative–Solidarity among Peoples and Andecha Astur in the 2009 election.; ^{4} Social Impulse results are compared to the combined totals of Spanish Alternative and Family and Life Party in the 2009 election.; ^{5} For the Republic, for the Rupture with the European Union results are compared to Internationalist Socialist Workers' Party totals in the 2009 election.

=== Madrid ===
← Summary of the 25 May 2014 European Parliament election results in Madrid →
Parties and alliances	Popular vote		
Parties and alliances	Votes	%	±pp
People's Party (PP)	665,244	29.98	−18.60
Spanish Socialist Workers' Party (PSOE)	420,594	18.95	−16.66
We Can (Podemos)	252,529	11.38	New
Union, Progress and Democracy (UPyD)	235,114	10.59	+3.74
United Left–The Greens: Plural Left (IU–LV)	234,667	10.57	+6.03
Citizens–Party of the Citizenry (C's)^{1}	106,807	4.81	+4.64
Vox (Vox)	81,405	3.67	New
European Spring (Equo–PUM+J–PCAS)^{2}	44,477	2.00	+1.76
Animalist Party Against Mistreatment of Animals (PACMA)	28,247	1.27	+1.03
Citizens' Democratic Renewal Movement (RED)	17,161	0.77	New
X Party, Party of the Future (Partido X)	16,569	0.75	New
Blank Seats (EB)	13,225	0.60	New
Electors' Group for the Disabled and Rare Diseases (DER)	5,150	0.23	New
Pirate Confederation–European Pirates (Piratas)	5,113	0.23	New
Spain on the Move (LEM)	4,288	0.19	New
Spanish Phalanx of the CNSO (FE de las JONS)	4,225	0.19	+0.12
Social Impulse (Impulso Social)^{3}	4,155	0.19	−0.29
Zero Cuts (Recortes Cero)	3,653	0.16	New
Communist Party of the Peoples of Spain (PCPE)	3,468	0.16	+0.08
Feminist Initiative (IFem)	2,928	0.13	+0.06
The Peoples Decide (LPD)^{4}	2,570	0.12	−0.07
National Democracy (DN)	2,423	0.11	+0.01
Humanist Party (PH)	2,185	0.10	+0.06
United Free Citizens (CILUS)	2,178	0.10	New
Asturias Forum (FAC)	2,118	0.10	New
United Extremadura (EU)	2,049	0.09	+0.05
Individual Freedom Party (P–LIB)	1,625	0.07	New
Republican Social Movement (MSR)	1,537	0.07	+0.02
Coalition for Europe (CEU)	1,531	0.07	+0.02
Republican Left–The Left for the Right to Decide (EPDD)	1,291	0.06	New
Extremadurans for Europe (IPEx–PREx–CREx)	979	0.04	New
Land Party (PT)	921	0.04	New
Internationalist Solidarity and Self-Management (SAIn)	906	0.04	+0.02
Red Current Movement (MCR)	874	0.04	New
For the Republic, for the Rupture with the European Union (RRUE)^{5}	870	0.04	−0.01
Regionalist Party of the Leonese Country (PREPAL)	838	0.04	+0.02
Republican Alternative (ALTER)	829	0.04	New
Andalusian Party (PA)	598	0.03	New
Europe Project (ACNV–BAR–PRAO–REPO–UNIO)	543	0.02	New
Blank ballots	43,333	1.95	+0.79
Total	2,219,217		
Valid votes	2,219,217	98.49	−1.06
Invalid votes	34,024	1.51	+1.06
Votes cast / turnout	2,253,241	46.45	−3.96
Abstentions	2,597,221	53.55	+3.96
Registered voters	4,850,462		
Sources
Footnotes: ^{1} Citizens–Party of the Citizenry results are compared to Libertas–Citizens of Spain totals in the 2009 election.; ^{2} European Spring results are compared to For a Fairer World totals in the 2009 election.; ^{3} Social Impulse results are compared to the combined totals of Spanish Alternative and Family and Life Party in the 2009 election.; ^{4} The Peoples Decide results are compared to the combined totals of Internationalist Initiative–Solidarity among Peoples and Andecha Astur in the 2009 election.; ^{5} For the Republic, for the Rupture with the European Union results are compared to Internationalist Socialist Workers' Party totals in the 2009 election.

=== Murcia ===
← Summary of the 25 May 2014 European Parliament election results in Murcia →
Parties and alliances	Popular vote		
Parties and alliances	Votes	%	±pp
People's Party (PP)	160,117	37.46	−24.05
Spanish Socialist Workers' Party (PSOE)	88,617	20.73	−9.10
United Left–Greens of the Region of Murcia: Plural Left (IU–V–RM)	41,860	9.79	+6.80
Union, Progress and Democracy (UPyD)	40,406	9.45	+6.58
We Can (Podemos)	32,428	7.59	New
Citizens–Party of the Citizenry (C's)^{1}	15,461	3.62	+3.51
Vox (Vox)	9,994	2.34	New
Animalist Party Against Mistreatment of Animals (PACMA)	5,362	1.25	+1.10
European Spring (Equo–PUM+J)^{2}	3,805	0.89	+0.78
Blank Seats (EB)	3,297	0.77	New
Citizens' Democratic Renewal Movement (RED)	2,893	0.68	New
X Party, Party of the Future (Partido X)	2,494	0.58	New
Zero Cuts (Recortes Cero)	1,405	0.33	New
Electors' Group for the Disabled and Rare Diseases (DER)	924	0.22	New
Social Impulse (Impulso Social)^{3}	806	0.19	+0.03
Communist Party of the Peoples of Spain (PCPE)	685	0.16	+0.10
Spanish Phalanx of the CNSO (FE de las JONS)	672	0.16	+0.10
Feminist Initiative (IFem)	636	0.15	+0.10
Pirate Confederation–European Pirates (Piratas)	614	0.14	New
United Free Citizens (CILUS)	602	0.14	New
Asturias Forum (FAC)	546	0.13	New
Spain on the Move (LEM)	494	0.12	New
National Democracy (DN)	469	0.11	+0.05
Individual Freedom Party (P–LIB)	418	0.10	New
The Peoples Decide (LPD)^{4}	355	0.08	+0.03
Humanist Party (PH)	336	0.08	+0.05
Coalition for Europe (CEU)	266	0.06	+0.04
Republican Social Movement (MSR)	264	0.06	+0.04
Land Party (PT)	251	0.06	New
Republican Alternative (ALTER)	231	0.05	New
For the Republic, for the Rupture with the European Union (RRUE)^{5}	212	0.05	+0.02
Republican Left–The Left for the Right to Decide (EPDD)	203	0.05	New
Internationalist Solidarity and Self-Management (SAIn)	186	0.04	+0.02
Europe Project (ACNV–BAR–PRAO–REPO–UNIO)	144	0.03	New
Andalusian Party (PA)	136	0.03	New
Red Current Movement (MCR)	123	0.03	New
United Extremadura (EU)	80	0.02	−0.01
Regionalist Party of the Leonese Country (PREPAL)	72	0.02	±0.00
Extremadurans for Europe (IPEx–PREx–CREx)	56	0.01	New
Blank ballots	9,544	2.23	+1.38
Total	427,464		
Valid votes	427,464	97.86	−1.44
Invalid votes	9,327	2.14	+1.44
Votes cast / turnout	436,791	42.50	−5.46
Abstentions	590,991	57.50	+5.46
Registered voters	1,027,782		
Sources
Footnotes: ^{1} Citizens–Party of the Citizenry results are compared to Libertas–Citizens of Spain totals in the 2009 election.; ^{2} European Spring results are compared to For a Fairer World totals in the 2009 election.; ^{3} Social Impulse results are compared to the combined totals of Spanish Alternative and Family and Life Party in the 2009 election.; ^{4} The Peoples Decide results are compared to the combined totals of Internationalist Initiative–Solidarity among Peoples and Andecha Astur in the 2009 election.; ^{5} For the Republic, for the Rupture with the European Union results are compared to Internationalist Socialist Workers' Party totals in the 2009 election.

=== Navarre ===
← Summary of the 25 May 2014 European Parliament election results in Navarre →
Parties and alliances	Popular vote		
Parties and alliances	Votes	%	±pp
People's Party (PP)	54,851	25.12	−12.67
Basque Country Gather (The Peoples Decide) (EH Bildu)^{1}	44,129	20.21	+1.86
Spanish Socialist Workers' Party (PSOE)	31,629	14.48	−17.00
Left: Plural Left (I–E)	20,704	9.48	+6.14
We Can (Podemos/Ahal Dugu)	20,327	9.31	New
Union, Progress and Democracy (UPyD)	9,976	4.57	+2.45
Basque Nationalist Party (Coalition for Europe) (EAJ/PNV)	5,552	2.54	+0.72
Citizens–Party of the Citizenry (C's)^{2}	3,889	1.78	+1.62
European Spring (Equo–PUM+J)^{3}	3,491	1.60	+1.25
Vox (Vox)	3,481	1.59	New
Blank Seats (EB)	2,467	1.13	New
Animalist Party Against Mistreatment of Animals (PACMA)	1,954	0.89	+0.65
Citizens' Democratic Renewal Movement (RED)	1,428	0.65	New
X Party, Party of the Future (Partido X)	1,171	0.54	New
Electors' Group for the Disabled and Rare Diseases (DER)	921	0.42	New
Pirate Confederation–European Pirates (Piratas)	781	0.36	New
Social Impulse (Impulso Social)^{4}	730	0.33	±0.00
Zero Cuts (Recortes Cero)	683	0.31	New
Internationalist Solidarity and Self-Management (SAIn)	672	0.31	+0.09
Feminist Initiative (IFem)	463	0.21	+0.11
Communist Party of the Peoples of Spain (PCPE)	441	0.20	+0.10
Republican Left–The Left for the Right to Decide (EPDD)	410	0.19	New
United Free Citizens (CILUS)	275	0.13	New
Humanist Party (PH)	241	0.11	+0.06
Asturias Forum (FAC)	238	0.11	New
Spanish Phalanx of the CNSO (FE de las JONS)	168	0.08	+0.02
Individual Freedom Party (P–LIB)	162	0.07	New
Republican Alternative (ALTER)	157	0.07	New
National Democracy (DN)	156	0.07	+0.01
Land Party (PT)	153	0.07	New
Republican Social Movement (MSR)	136	0.06	−0.09
Regionalist Party of the Leonese Country (PREPAL)	125	0.06	+0.03
For the Republic, for the Rupture with the European Union (RRUE)^{5}	114	0.05	−0.07
Spain on the Move (LEM)	112	0.05	New
Europe Project (ACNV–BAR–PRAO–REPO–UNIO)	81	0.04	New
United Extremadura (EU)	81	0.04	+0.02
Extremadurans for Europe (IPEx–PREx–CREx)	48	0.02	New
Andalusian Party (PA)	48	0.02	New
Red Current Movement (MCR)	45	0.02	New
Blank ballots	5,899	2.70	+1.15
Total	218,389		
Valid votes	218,389	98.38	−0.86
Invalid votes	3,591	1.62	+0.86
Votes cast / turnout	221,980	44.55	+1.86
Abstentions	276,333	55.45	−1.86
Registered voters	498,313		
Sources
Footnotes: ^{1} Basque Country Gather (The Peoples Decide) results are compared to the combined totals of Internationalist Initiative–Solidarity among Peoples and Independentists and Leftists (Europe of the Peoples–Greens) in the 2009 election.; ^{2} Citizens–Party of the Citizenry results are compared to Libertas–Citizens of Spain totals in the 2009 election.; ^{3} European Spring results are compared to For a Fairer World totals in the 2009 election.; ^{4} Social Impulse results are compared to the combined totals of Family and Life Party and Spanish Alternative in the 2009 election.; ^{5} For the Republic, for the Rupture with the European Union results are compared to Internationalist Socialist Workers' Party totals in the 2009 election.

=== Valencian Community ===
← Summary of the 25 May 2014 European Parliament election results in the Valencian Community →
Parties and alliances	Popular vote		
Parties and alliances	Votes	%	±pp
People's Party (PP)	510,586	29.01	−23.22
Spanish Socialist Workers' Party (PSOE)	379,541	21.56	−16.03
United Left of the Valencian Country–The Greens: Plural Left (EUPV–EV)	186,092	10.57	+7.77
Union, Progress and Democracy (UPyD)	149,529	8.50	+6.36
We Can (Podemos/Podem)	144,564	8.21	New
Commitment Coalition (European Spring) (Compromís)^{1}	139,863	7.95	+6.97
Citizens–Party of the Citizenry (C's)^{2}	51,550	2.93	+2.81
Vox (Vox)	30,071	1.71	New
Animalist Party Against Mistreatment of Animals (PACMA)	22,941	1.30	+1.07
Citizens' Democratic Renewal Movement (RED)	15,531	0.88	New
X Party, Party of the Future (Partido X)	13,505	0.77	New
Blank Seats (EB)	12,479	0.71	New
Republican Left–The Left for the Right to Decide (EPDD)^{3}	8,129	0.46	−0.06
Valencians for Europe–Europe Project (ACNV–REPO–UNIO)	6,033	0.34	New
Communist Party of the Peoples of Spain (PCPE)	4,732	0.27	+0.17
Zero Cuts (Recortes Cero)	4,614	0.26	New
Pirate Confederation–European Pirates (Piratas)	4,589	0.26	New
Electors' Group for the Disabled and Rare Diseases (DER)	4,373	0.25	New
Spanish Phalanx of the CNSO (FE de las JONS)	3,681	0.21	+0.14
Spain on the Move (LEM)	3,260	0.19	New
Feminist Initiative (IFem)	3,001	0.17	+0.12
United Free Citizens (CILUS)	2,608	0.15	New
Coalition for Europe (CEU)	2,316	0.13	New
Social Impulse (Impulso Social)^{4}	2,236	0.13	−0.01
Asturias Forum (FAC)	2,117	0.12	New
The Peoples Decide (LPD)^{5}	2,081	0.12	−0.08
Humanist Party (PH)	2,030	0.12	+0.07
National Democracy (DN)	1,801	0.10	+0.05
Land Party (PT)	1,451	0.08	New
Individual Freedom Party (P–LIB)	1,390	0.08	New
Republican Alternative (ALTER)	1,298	0.07	New
Republican Social Movement (MSR)	1,237	0.07	+0.03
For the Republic, for the Rupture with the European Union (RRUE)^{6}	1,110	0.06	±0.00
Andalusian Party (PA)	748	0.04	New
United Extremadura (EU)	626	0.04	+0.03
Internationalist Solidarity and Self-Management (SAIn)	462	0.03	+0.02
Regionalist Party of the Leonese Country (PREPAL)	460	0.03	+0.02
Red Current Movement (MCR)	439	0.02	New
Extremadurans for Europe (IPEx–PREx–CREx)	384	0.02	New
Blank ballots	36,636	2.08	+1.00
Total	1,760,094		
Valid votes	1,760,094	97.86	−1.48
Invalid votes	38,426	2.14	+1.48
Votes cast / turnout	1,798,520	49.06	−3.74
Abstentions	1,867,795	50.94	+3.74
Registered voters	3,666,315		
Sources
Footnotes: ^{1} Commitment Coalition (European Spring) results are compared to Valencian Nationalist Bloc–Coalition for Europe totals in the 2009 election.; ^{2} Citizens–Party of the Citizenry results are compared to Libertas–Citizens of Spain totals in the 2009 election.; ^{3} Republican Left–The Left for the Right to Decide results are compared to Republican Left of the Valencian Country (Europe of the Peoples–Greens) totals in the 2009 election.; ^{4} Social Impulse results are compared to the combined totals of Spanish Alternative and Family and Life Party in the 2009 election.; ^{5} The Peoples Decide results are compared to the combined totals of Internationalist Initiative–Solidarity among Peoples and Andecha Astur in the 2009 election.; ^{6} For the Republic, for the Rupture with the European Union results are compared to Internationalist Socialist Workers' Party totals in the 2009 election.

== Autonomous cities ==
=== Ceuta ===
← Summary of the 25 May 2014 European Parliament election results in Ceuta →
Parties and alliances	Popular vote		
Parties and alliances	Votes	%	±pp
People's Party (PP)	6,346	40.33	−19.19
Spanish Socialist Workers' Party (PSOE)	3,548	22.55	−10.13
Equo–Caballas Coalition (European Spring) (eQuo–Caballas)	1,409	8.95	New
Union, Progress and Democracy (UPyD)	1,072	6.81	+3.18
We Can (Podemos)	581	3.69	New
United Left–The Greens: Plural Left (IU–LV)	534	3.39	+2.89
Citizens–Party of the Citizenry (C's)^{1}	379	2.41	+2.27
Vox (Vox)	276	1.75	New
Animalist Party Against Mistreatment of Animals (PACMA)	227	1.44	+1.22
Blank Seats (EB)	119	0.76	New
X Party, Party of the Future (Partido X)	76	0.48	New
Spanish Phalanx of the CNSO (FE de las JONS)	70	0.44	+0.39
Citizens' Democratic Renewal Movement (RED)	66	0.42	New
Zero Cuts (Recortes Cero)	60	0.38	New
Electors' Group for the Disabled and Rare Diseases (DER)	34	0.22	New
Andalusian Party (PA)	34	0.22	New
Communist Party of the Peoples of Spain (PCPE)	28	0.18	−0.04
Spain on the Move (LEM)	27	0.17	New
For the Republic, for the Rupture with the European Union (RRUE)^{2}	25	0.16	+0.05
Pirate Confederation–European Pirates (Piratas)	25	0.16	New
Humanist Party (PH)	22	0.14	+0.11
Feminist Initiative (IFem)	22	0.14	+0.10
The Peoples Decide (LPD)^{3}	20	0.13	+0.03
Individual Freedom Party (P–LIB)	19	0.12	New
Social Impulse (Impulso Social)^{4}	19	0.12	−0.11
National Democracy (DN)	18	0.11	+0.05
United Free Citizens (CILUS)	16	0.10	New
Coalition for Europe (CEU)	15	0.10	+0.03
Asturias Forum (FAC)	11	0.07	New
The Left for the Right to Decide (EPDD)	10	0.06	New
Land Party (PT)	9	0.06	New
Republican Social Movement (MSR)	9	0.06	+0.04
Red Current Movement (MCR)	8	0.05	New
Republican Alternative (ALTER)	6	0.04	New
Internationalist Solidarity and Self-Management (SAIn)	5	0.03	+0.02
Regionalist Party of the Leonese Country (PREPAL)	5	0.03	+0.02
United Extremadura (EU)	5	0.03	+0.03
Europe Project (ACNV–BAR–PRAO–REPO–UNIO)	5	0.03	New
Extremadurans for Europe (IPEx–PREx–CREx)	3	0.02	New
Blank ballots	572	3.64	+2.62
Total	15,735		
Valid votes	15,735	98.15	−1.28
Invalid votes	297	1.85	+1.28
Votes cast / turnout	16,032	25.93	−5.72
Abstentions	45,807	74.07	+5.72
Registered voters	61,839		
Sources
Footnotes: ^{1} Citizens–Party of the Citizenry results are compared to Libertas–Citizens of Spain totals in the 2009 election.; ^{2} For the Republic, for the Rupture with the European Union results are compared to Internationalist Socialist Workers' Party totals in the 2009 election.; ^{3} The Peoples Decide results are compared to the combined totals of Internationalist Initiative–Solidarity among Peoples and Andecha Astur in the 2009 election.; ^{4} Social Impulse results are compared to the combined totals of Spanish Alternative and Family and Life Party in the 2009 election.

=== Melilla ===
← Summary of the 25 May 2014 European Parliament election results in Melilla →
Parties and alliances	Popular vote		
Parties and alliances	Votes	%	±pp
People's Party (PP)	6,392	43.96	−12.11
Spanish Socialist Workers' Party (PSOE)	3,634	24.99	−12.49
Union, Progress and Democracy (UPyD)	1,017	6.99	+3.71
Vox (Vox)	858	5.90	New
United Left–The Greens: Plural Left (IU–LV)	485	3.34	+2.82
We Can (Podemos)	423	2.91	New
European Spring (Equo–PUM+J)^{1}	301	2.07	+2.01
Citizens–Party of the Citizenry (C's)^{2}	265	1.82	+1.73
Animalist Party Against Mistreatment of Animals (PACMA)	164	1.13	+1.01
Citizens' Democratic Renewal Movement (RED)	73	0.50	New
Blank Seats (EB)	63	0.43	New
X Party, Party of the Future (Partido X)	55	0.38	New
Spanish Phalanx of the CNSO (FE de las JONS)	41	0.28	+0.22
Spain on the Move (LEM)	32	0.22	New
Humanist Party (PH)	25	0.17	+0.13
Asturias Forum (FAC)	23	0.16	New
Communist Party of the Peoples of Spain (PCPE)	22	0.15	+0.07
National Democracy (DN)	20	0.14	+0.09
Pirate Confederation–European Pirates (Piratas)	15	0.10	New
Electors' Group for the Disabled and Rare Diseases (DER)	15	0.10	New
Zero Cuts (Recortes Cero)	14	0.10	New
Feminist Initiative (IFem)	13	0.09	+0.05
United Free Citizens (CILUS)	12	0.08	New
Andalusian Party (PA)	11	0.08	New
Coalition for Europe (CEU)	11	0.08	+0.04
Social Impulse (Impulso Social)^{3}	11	0.08	−0.04
The Peoples Decide (LPD)^{4}	9	0.06	±0.00
For the Republic, for the Rupture with the European Union (RRUE)^{5}	7	0.05	−0.06
Republican Social Movement (MSR)	7	0.05	+0.04
Internationalist Solidarity and Self-Management (SAIn)	6	0.04	+0.03
Land Party (PT)	5	0.03	New
Extremadurans for Europe (IPEx–PREx–CREx)	5	0.03	New
Republican Alternative (ALTER)	4	0.03	New
The Left for the Right to Decide (EPDD)	4	0.03	New
Individual Freedom Party (P–LIB)	3	0.02	New
Regionalist Party of the Leonese Country (PREPAL)	3	0.02	+0.02
Red Current Movement (MCR)	2	0.01	New
Europe Project (ACNV–BAR–PRAO–REPO–UNIO)	2	0.01	New
United Extremadura (EU)	0	0.00	−0.02
Blank ballots	490	3.37	+2.34
Total	14,542		
Valid votes	14,542	98.07	−1.24
Invalid votes	286	1.93	+1.24
Votes cast / turnout	14,828	26.05	−6.98
Abstentions	42,084	73.95	+6.98
Registered voters	56,912		
Sources
Footnotes: ^{1} European Spring results are compared to For a Fairer World totals in the 2009 election.; ^{2} Citizens–Party of the Citizenry results are compared to Libertas–Citizens of Spain totals in the 2009 election.; ^{3} Social Impulse results are compared to the combined totals of Spanish Alternative and Family and Life Party in the 2009 election.; ^{4} The Peoples Decide results are compared to the combined totals of Internationalist Initiative–Solidarity among Peoples and Andecha Astur in the 2009 election.; ^{5} For the Republic, for the Rupture with the European Union results are compared to Internationalist Socialist Workers' Party totals in the 2009 election.

== Congress of Deputies projection ==
A projection of European Parliament election results using electoral rules for the Congress of Deputies would have given the following seat allocation, as distributed per constituencies and regions: (Note: Note that results are compared with party totals in the preceding general election—held in November 2011—for consistency.)

Summary of the 25 May 2014 Congress of Deputies projected election results
Parties and alliances	Popular vote			Seats	
Parties and alliances	Votes	%	±pp	Total	+/−
People's Party (PP)	4,098,339	26.09	−18.54	138	−48
Spanish Socialist Workers' Party (PSOE)	3,614,232	23.01	−5.75	106	−4
United Left–Plural Left (IU–IP)	1,575,308	10.03	+3.11	24	+13
We Can (Podemos)	1,253,837	7.98	New	19	+19
Union, Progress and Democracy (UPyD)	1,022,232	6.51	+1.81	10	+5
Republican Left–New Catalan Left–Catalonia Yes (ERC–NECat–CatSí)	623,224	3.97	+0.61	15	+12
Convergence and Union (CiU)	549,096	3.50	+1.52	14	−2
Citizens–Party of the Citizenry (C's)	497,146	3.16	New	4	+4
Vox (Vox)	246,833	1.57	New	1	+1
Basque Country Gather (EH Bildu)^{1}	221,823	1.41	+0.04	8	+1
Basque Nationalist Party (EAJ/PNV)	214,539	1.37	+0.04	7	+2
Commitment Coalition (Compromís)	139,863	0.89	+0.38	2	+1
Galician Nationalist Bloc (BNG)	80,394	0.51	−0.25	0	−2
Canarian Coalition–Canarian Nationalist Party (CCa–PNC)	69,601	0.44	−0.15	2	±0
Asturias Forum (FAC)	16,064	0.10	−0.31	0	−1
Yes to the Future (GBai)	n/a	n/a	−0.17	0	−1
Others	1,126,118	7.17	—	0	±0
Blank ballots	361,567	2.30	+0.93		
Total	15,710,216			350	±0
Sources
Footnotes: ^{1} Basque Country Gather results are compared to Amaiur totals in the 2011 election.

=== Constituencies ===

Summary of constituency results in the 25 May 2014 European Parliament election in Spain
Constituency	PP		PSOE		IU–IP		Podemos		UPyD		ERC		CiU		C's		Vox		EH Bildu		PNV		Compromís		CCa–PNC	
Constituency	%	S	%	S	%	S	%	S	%	S	%	S	%	S	%	S	%	S	%	S	%	S	%	S	%	S
A Coruña	32.3	4	21.2	2	11.6	1	9.3	1	3.8	−					1.9	−	1.1	−								
Álava	16.0	1	15.2	1	6.3	−	8.9	−	4.5	−					1.1	−	0.9	−	19.5	1	17.2	1				
Albacete	35.6	2	28.8	2	9.0	−	7.4	−	7.5	−					2.2	−	1.3	−								
Alicante	30.6	5	22.8	4	10.0	1	8.9	1	8.9	1	0.4	−			3.2	−	1.6	−					4.8	−		
Almería	35.1	3	32.9	3	7.6	−	5.6	−	6.6	−					2.4	−	1.0	−								
Asturias	24.2	3	26.1	3	12.9	1	13.6	1	6.0	−					2.5	−	1.3	−								
Ávila	45.4	2	19.2	1	7.0	−	5.1	−	8.0	−					2.2	−	2.2	−								
Badajoz	34.9	3	40.1	3	6.5	−	5.7	−	4.3	−					0.9	−	1.0	−								
Balearic Islands	27.5	3	22.0	3	8.9	1	10.3	1	6.7	−	7.3	−			2.3	−	1.5	−								
Barcelona	10.1	3	15.2	5	11.3	4	5.2	2	1.4	−	21.9	8	19.8	7	6.9	2	0.3	−								
Biscay	10.0	1	13.6	1	5.7	−	6.7	−	3.2	−					0.8	−	0.6	−	19.9	2	31.8	4				
Burgos	36.8	3	20.2	1	8.3	−	9.7	−	9.1	−					2.5	−	3.2	−								
Cáceres	36.6	2	36.5	2	6.0	−	5.6	−	5.1	−					1.1	−	0.9	−								
Cádiz	23.7	3	30.9	3	12.1	1	10.7	1	7.5	−					1.8	−	1.0	−								
Cantabria	34.7	3	24.3	2	9.0	−	9.2	−	8.2	−					3.0	−	1.8	−								
Castellón	32.0	3	22.9	2	8.7	−	7.8	−	7.2	−	0.8	−			3.1	−	1.2	−					6.3	−		
Ceuta	40.3	1	22.5	−	3.4	−	3.7	−	6.8	−					2.4	−	1.8	−								
Ciudad Real	37.8	3	31.5	2	8.6	−	5.0	−	7.2	−					1.9	−	1.0	−								
Córdoba	27.1	2	35.0	3	14.9	1	5.4	−	5.8	−					1.1	−	1.0	−								
Cuenca	43.1	2	31.0	1	7.0	−	5.2	−	5.2	−					1.3	−	1.1	−								
Gipuzkoa	7.9	−	13.7	1	5.0	−	6.4	−	3.0	−					0.7	−	0.4	−	31.1	3	24.5	2				
Girona	6.6	−	10.0	−	6.9	−	2.4	−	0.9	−	32.9	3	30.7	3	3.5	−	0.2	−								
Granada	28.3	3	35.3	3	10.7	1	6.1	−	6.8	−					1.9	−	1.8	−								
Guadalajara	33.7	2	22.3	1	9.5	−	8.8	−	9.5	−					3.9	−	2.9	−								
Huelva	25.3	2	41.3	3	9.6	−	6.3	−	5.6	−					1.1	−	0.6	−								
Huesca	30.2	2	26.8	1	8.4	−	9.0	−	7.4	−					2.5	−	1.4	−								
Jaén	28.9	2	42.8	4	9.6	−	4.3	−	5.3	−					0.9	−	0.7	−								
La Rioja	38.4	3	23.7	1	8.1	−	7.5	−	9.0	−					2.3	−	1.4	−								
Las Palmas	23.9	3	21.4	2	10.6	1	13.6	1	7.2	−					1.5	−	0.8	−							9.8	1
León	33.1	3	27.6	2	8.6	−	9.5	−	6.9	−					3.0	−	1.8	−								
Lleida	9.3	−	9.8	−	6.7	−	2.2	−	0.8	−	29.7	2	31.8	2	3.1	−	0.3	−								
Lugo	42.3	3	23.7	1	8.1	−	5.7	−	2.9	−					1.1	−	0.4	−								
Madrid	30.0	13	19.0	8	10.6	4	11.4	4	10.6	4					4.8	2	3.7	1								
Málaga	25.5	3	30.1	4	12.7	1	7.4	1	9.2	1					2.4	−	1.6	−								
Melilla	44.0	1	25.0	−	3.3	−	2.9	−	7.0	−					1.8	−	5.9	−								
Murcia	37.5	5	20.7	2	9.8	1	7.6	1	9.5	1					3.6	−	2.3	−								
Navarre	25.1	2	14.5	1	9.5	−	9.3	−	4.6	−					1.8	−	1.6	−	20.2	2	2.5	−				
Ourense	44.7	3	23.4	1	6.8	−	5.1	−	2.7	−					1.2	−	0.6	−								
Palencia	39.0	2	25.7	1	8.8	−	6.3	−	7.4	−					1.9	−	2.1	−								
Pontevedra	32.4	3	21.2	2	11.4	1	9.4	1	3.6	−					1.6	−	0.6	−								
Salamanca	41.7	3	22.9	1	6.9	−	5.8	−	8.5	−					2.8	−	2.6	−								
Santa Cruz de Tenerife	22.9	2	23.1	2	10.3	1	8.2	1	6.6	−					1.3	−	0.8	−							14.8	1
Segovia	39.5	2	21.4	1	7.4	−	9.1	−	9.7	−					2.1	−	2.0	−								
Seville	22.1	3	37.2	6	12.1	1	7.8	1	7.4	1					1.7	−	1.2	−								
Soria	41.3	1	21.9	1	5.9	−	12.3	−	6.3	−					2.4	−	1.5	−								
Tarragona	10.7	1	13.5	1	7.6	−	4.0	−	1.4	−	25.3	2	23.4	2	6.3	−	0.4	−								
Teruel	35.7	2	27.1	1	8.1	−	7.8	−	6.1	−					1.8	−	1.1	−								
Toledo	38.6	4	28.2	2	8.8	−	6.3	−	6.9	−					2.2	−	1.5	−								
Valencia	27.5	6	20.6	4	11.3	2	7.9	1	8.5	1	0.4	−			2.8	−	1.9	−					10.1	2		
Valladolid	33.6	3	23.1	2	10.2	−	7.6	−	9.8	−					3.3	−	3.4	−								
Zamora	41.7	2	24.5	1	7.2	−	9.5	−	6.6	−					1.9	−	1.4	−								
Zaragoza	26.2	2	23.4	2	9.8	1	9.9	1	9.1	1					3.2	−	2.7	−								
Total	26.1	138	23.0	106	10.0	24	8.0	19	6.5	10	4.0	15	3.5	14	3.2	4	1.6	1	1.4	8	1.4	7	0.9	2	0.4	2

=== Regions ===

Summary of regional results in the 25 May 2014 European Parliament election in Spain
Region	PP		PSOE		IU–IP		Podemos		UPyD		ERC		CiU		C's		Vox		EH Bildu		PNV		Compromís		CCa–PNC	
Region	%	S	%	S	%	S	%	S	%	S	%	S	%	S	%	S	%	S	%	S	%	S	%	S	%	S
Andalusia	25.9	21	35.1	29	11.6	5	7.1	3	7.1	2					1.7	−	1.2	−								
Aragon	27.9	6	24.3	4	9.4	1	9.5	1	8.5	1					2.9	−	2.3	−								
Asturias	24.2	3	26.1	3	12.9	1	13.6	1	6.0	−					2.5	−	1.3	−								
Balearic Islands	27.5	3	22.0	3	8.9	1	10.3	1	6.7	−	7.3	−			2.3	−	1.5	−								
Basque Country	10.2	2	13.8	3	5.5	−	6.9	−	3.3	−					0.8	−	0.6	−	23.4	6	27.5	7				
Canary Islands	23.4	5	22.2	4	10.5	2	11.0	2	6.9	−					1.4	−	0.8	−							12.2	2
Cantabria	34.7	3	24.3	2	9.0	−	9.2	−	8.2	−					3.0	−	1.8	−								
Castile and León	37.5	21	23.4	11	8.3	−	8.1	−	8.3	−					2.7	−	2.5	−								
Castilla–La Mancha	37.7	13	28.8	8	8.7	−	6.4	−	7.2	−					2.2	−	1.5	−								
Catalonia	9.8	4	14.3	6	10.3	4	4.7	2	1.3	−	23.7	15	21.8	14	6.3	2	0.3	−								
Ceuta	40.3	1	22.5	−	3.4	−	3.7	−	6.8	−					2.4	−	1.8	−								
Extremadura	35.6	5	38.7	5	6.3	−	4.8	−	5.5	−					1.0	−	1.0	−								
Galicia	35.2	13	21.8	6	10.5	2	8.4	2	3.5	−					1.6	−	0.8	−								
La Rioja	38.4	3	23.7	1	8.1	−	7.5	−	9.0	−					2.3	−	1.4	−								
Madrid	30.0	13	19.0	8	10.6	4	11.4	4	10.6	4					4.8	2	3.7	1								
Melilla	44.0	1	25.0	−	3.3	−	2.9	−	7.0	−					1.8	−	5.9	−								
Murcia	37.5	5	20.7	2	9.8	1	7.6	1	9.5	1					3.6	−	2.3	−								
Navarre	25.1	2	14.5	1	9.5	−	9.3	−	4.6	−					1.8	−	1.6	−	20.2	2	2.5	−				
Valencian Community	29.0	14	21.6	10	10.6	3	8.2	2	8.5	2	0.5	−			2.9	−	1.7	−					7.9	2		
Total	26.1	138	23.0	106	10.0	24	8.0	19	6.5	10	4.0	15	3.5	14	3.2	4	1.6	1	1.4	8	1.4	7	0.9	2	0.4	2
