= PSTU =

PSTU may refer to:

- Patuakhali Science and Technology University, a university in Bangladesh
- Partido Socialista dos Trabalhadores Unificado (United Socialist Workers' Party), a Brazilian political party
- Partido Socialista de los Trabajadores Unificado (United Socialist Workers' Party (Argentina)), an Argentine political party
- Perm State Technical University, a university in Perm, Russia
- Potti Sreeramulu Telugu University, a university in India
