= Workers' Revolutionary Party–Revolutionary Left =

Workers' Revolutionary Party–Revolutionary Left Partido Revolucionario de los Trabajadores–Izquierda Revolucionaria
- Founded: 2002
- Dissolved: 2011
- Merger of: Workers' Revolutionary Party; Revolutionary Left
- Headquarters: Madrid
- Newspaper: A luchar por el socialismo
- Ideology: Communism; Trotskyism
- Political position: Far-left
- National affiliation: United Left; Corriente Roja
- International: International Workers' League - Fourth International
- Colors: Red

The Workers' Revolutionary Party–Revolutionary Left (Spanish language: Partido Revolucionario de los Trabajadores–Izquierda Revolucionaria. PRT–IR) was a Spanish Trotskyist political organization, formed in the summer of 2002 as a result of the merger of the Workers' Revolutionary Party (PRT) and the Revolutionary Left (IR). Organizing the struggle for socialism was the main goal of the formation. It was the official section in Spain of the International Workers' League - Fourth International (IWL).

== History ==
In the spring of 2004, the PRT–IR left the United Left (IU) coalition, accusing IU of supporting the government of the Spanish Socialist Workers' Party (PSOE). Since then, the PRT-IR approached Corriente Roja, another split of IU.

=== Dissolution ===
In 2012 PRT-IR joined Corriente Roja.
