= Ana Miranda Paz =

Spanish politician (born 1971)

Ana Miranda Paz MEP
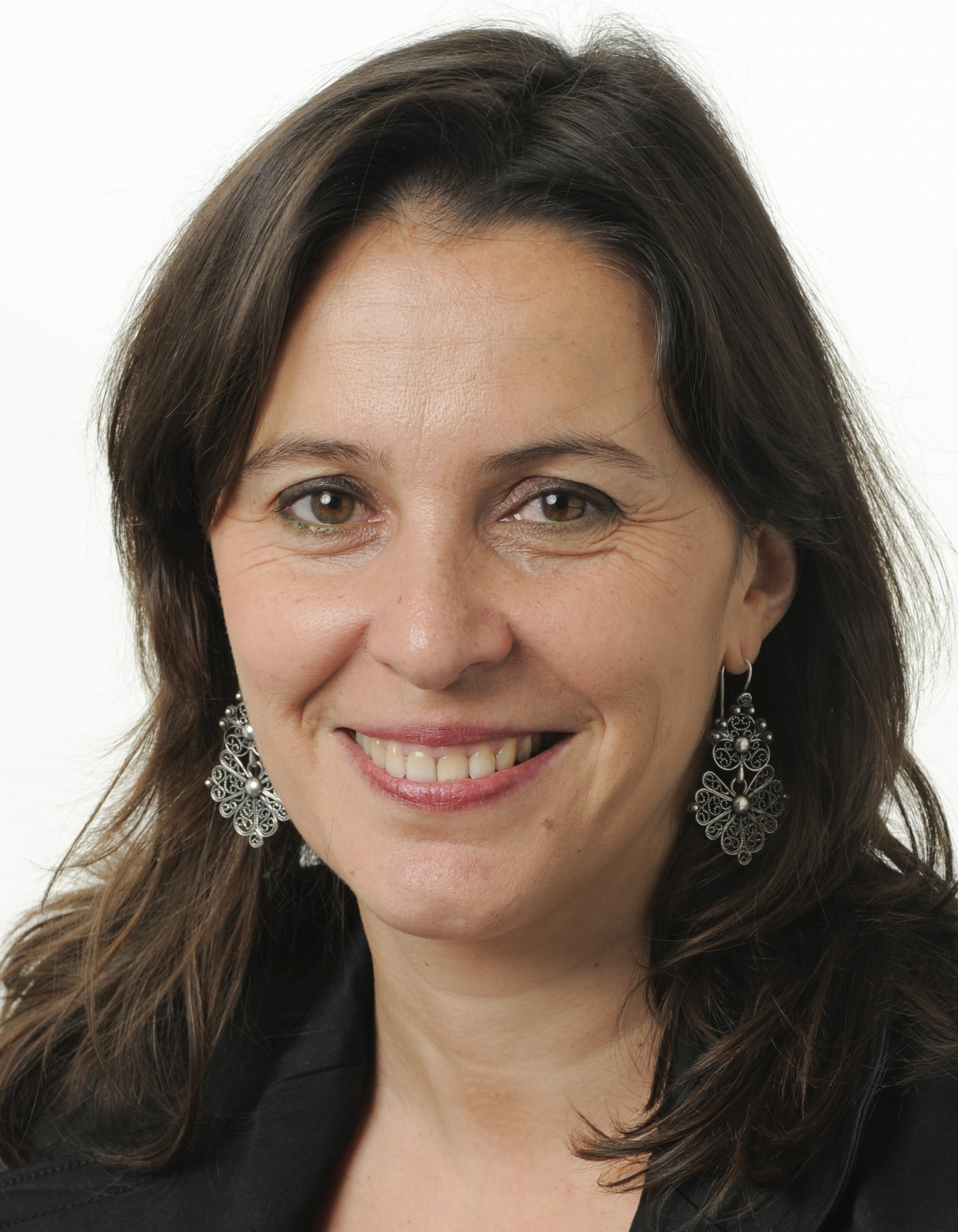

Member of the European Parliament for Spain
- Incumbent
- Assumed office 5 September 2022
- Preceded by: Pernando Barrena
- In office 28 February 2018 – 1 July 2019
- Preceded by: Josu Juaristi
- In office 1 January 2012 – 9 July 2013
- Preceded by: Oriol Junqueras
- Succeeded by: Iñaki Irazabalbeitia

Personal details
- Born: 2 May 1971 (age 55) Cuntis, Spain
- Party: Galician Nationalist Bloc
- Education: University of Santiago de Compostela
- Occupation: Lawyer • Politician

Ana Maria Miranda Paz (Galician pronunciation: [ˈana miˈɾanda]; born 2 May 1971) is a Spanish politician of the Galician Nationalist Bloc. She has served thrice in the European Parliament.

== Career in the European Parliament ==
=== 2009 European Parliament election ===
Miranda was on the list of the Europe of the Peoples–Greens electoral alliance in the 2009 European elections. The alliance won a single seat which was held first by Oriol Junqueras of ERC (Republican Left of Catalonia). Miranda joined the European Parliament in January 2012 after Junqueras stood down. She served until 2013.

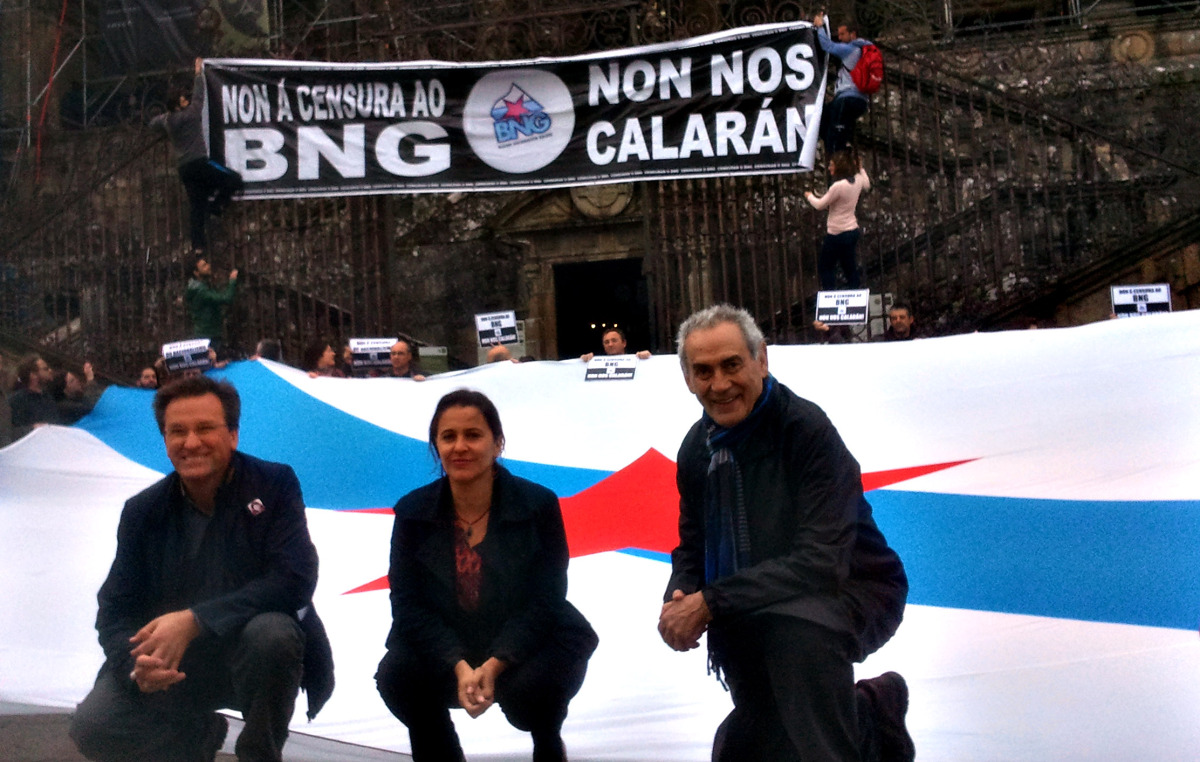
Ana Miranda with Camilo Nogueira and Xavier Vence in the 2014 European elections campaign.

=== 2014 European Parliament election ===
In the 2014 European elections, Miranda stood on the list of The Peoples Decide alliance. The alliance won a single seat which it was decided to allocate on a rotative basis to Ana Miranda and Josu Juaristi. The latter candidate, a member of EH Bildu, held the seat first. Miranda took over the seat in February 2018, joining the parliamentary group of the Greens/European Free Alliance in March.

=== 2019 European Parliament election ===
In the 2019 election the Galician nationalists were allied with the electoral coalition Ahora Repúblicas, which included ERC, EH Bildu and some other minor nationalist parties as well. The coalition obtained 3 seats to be held rotatively. Ana Miranda replaced Pernando Barrena in September 2022.
