= Alicia Hermida =

Spanish actress (1932–2022)

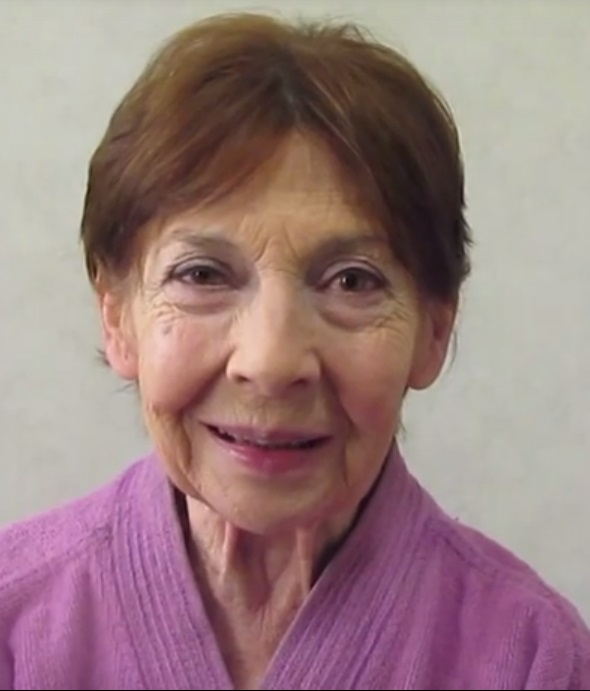
- Hermida in 2014
- Born: Alicia Pérez Herranz; 26 September 1932; Madrid, Spain
- Died: 9 February 2022 (aged 89); Villanueva de la Cañada, Community of Madrid, Spain
- Occupations: Actress; acting coach

Alicia Pérez Herranz, best known as Alicia Hermida (26 September 1932 – 9 February 2022) was a Spanish actress and acting teacher.

== Life and career ==
Alicia Pérez Herranz (her real name) was born in Madrid on 26 September 1932. She made her stage debut at the age of 13, and in the 1970s she formed her own theatrical company, La Barraca. In 1980 she founded an acting school, the Escuela Alicia Hermida ("Alicia Hermida School"). She was also active in cinema, where she debuted in 1960 and worked with prominent directors such as José Luis Cuerda, Emilio Martínez-Lázaro and Jaime Chávarri, and on television, where she was best known for her roles in the long-running series Cuéntame cómo pasó and in Las chicas de oro, the Spanish remake of The Golden Girls.

During her career Hermida was the recipient of several honors and accolades, including the 1998 Max Award for Best Supporting Actress for her role in Divinas palabras and a Lifetime Achievement Award by the Spanish Actors Union in 2017.

Beyond her career, she distinguished herself for strong left-leaning views and was a vocal supporter of the Cuban Revolution. She also ran as a candidate to the 2009 European Parliament election in Spain with the Iniciativa Internacionalista-La Solidaridad entre los Pueblos electoral list.

Hermida died on 9 February 2022, age 89, in the retirement home where she lived with her husband, the actor Jaime Losada.
