= Pirate Party of Galicia =

Pirates of Galicia Piratas de Galicia
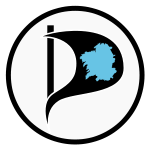
- Founded: 26 December 2011
- Headquarters: Santiago de Compostela
- Ideology: Pirate politics Freedom of Information; Privacy protection Intellectual property reform Transparency of government Direct democracy
- National affiliation: Pirate Party (Spain)
- International affiliation: Pirate Parties International

Website
- PiratasDeGalicia.org

Pirates of Galicia (Galician: Piratas de Galicia, PIRATA.GAL), is a political party in Galicia, Spain. It inherits the ideology from Pirate Party of Sweden, that seeks the reform of intellectual property and patent laws, the inclusion of direct democracy in the political system and the defense of Human Rights within and outside the Internet.

== History ==
The party was founded on December 26, 2011, and it is officially admitted in the Register of Political Parties of the Ministry of Interior of Spain on January 26, 2012.

They ran elections for the first time on October 21, 2012, to the Galician Parliament in the provinces of Ourense and Pontevedra. The results were 336 votes in Ourense (0,18% over participation) and 1215 in Pontevedra (0,24% over participation).
