= Coalition for Europe (2014) =

Coalition for Europe Coalición por Europa
- Abbreviation: CEU
- Leader: Ramon Tremosa
- Founded: 2014
- Dissolved: 2019
- Preceded by: Coalition for Europe (2009)
- Succeeded by: Coalition for a Solidary Europe
- Ideology: Regionalism; Europeanism
- Political position: Centre-left to centre-right
- European Parliament group: ALDE (CDC, EAJ-PNV); EPP (UDC)

Coalition for Europe (Spanish: Coalición por Europa, CEU) was a Spanish electoral list in the European Parliament election in 2014 made up from regionalist parties. It was the successor of the 2009 coalition of the same name. As in 2009, Ramon Tremosa was confirmed as the coalition's leading candidate.

== Composition ==
Party	Scope
Convergence and Union (CiU)	Catalonia
Basque Nationalist Party (EAJ/PNV)	Basque Country, Navarre
Canarian Coalition–Canarian Nationalist Party (CCa–PNC)	Canary Islands
Commitment to Galicia (CxG)	Galicia
Independence Rally (RI.cat)	Catalonia

== Electoral performance ==
=== European Parliament ===
European Parliament
Election	Vote	%	Score	Seats	+/–
2014	851,971	5.4	6th	3 / 54	0
