= Corriente Roja =

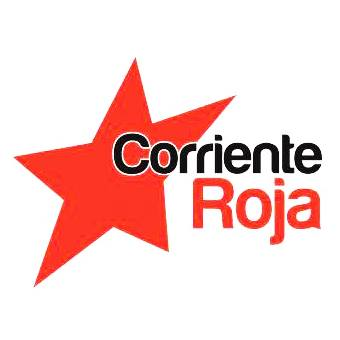
- Catalan name: Corrent Roig
- Galician name: Corrente Vermella
- Leader: Ángel Luis Parras
- Founded: 2002
- Headquarters: Madrid
- Ideology: Communism; Trotskyism; Internationalism; Feminism; Eco-socialism
- Political position: Far-left
- National affiliation: United Left (2002–2004)
- International: International Workers' League - Fourth International (since 2012)
- Colors: Red

Website
- corrienteroja.net

Corriente Roja (lit. 'Red Current' or 'Red Stream'; abbrev. CR) is a Spanish Trotskyist political organization, adhering to the International Workers League – Fourth International in 2012. CR defends and supports social struggles, class independence and political gains of the working class in order to establish a republic of workers. CR proposes the construction of a socialist economy, based on workers' democracy and the traditions of the alternative labor movement. According to its mission statement, current Red describes itself as follows:

Corriente Roja will put in place a strategy defined by its anticapitalist Marxist character, radically democratic, internationalist, ecologist and feminist

The organization is present in Madrid, Seville and Catalonia, and has some members in Galicia. In Catalonia Corriente Roja is called Corrent Roig, while in Galicia it is called Corrente Vermella.

== History ==
CR was formed as an internal current in the United Left (IU) in 2002, characterized by the defense of communist values they thought had been lost in the progressive deideologization of IU. In 2004 the organization left the coalition.

Initially, its members were free to belong to other political parties, part of its membership being until June 2005 affiliated to the Communist Party of Spain (PCE). The most representative figure during this period was the ex-MP Ángeles Maestro. Currently the organization is part of the International Workers' League - Fourth International (IWL). The majority of those members of the PCE were expelled from the party in 2005 for supporting the Communist Party of the Basque Homelands (PCTV-EHAK) in the Basque elections of that year, and not the Ezker Batua-Berdeak, the Basque affiliate of the PCE and the IU.

In May 2007 the organization suffered a split in Madrid, that formed Comunistas 3. Comunistas 3 accused the Revolutionary Workers Party - Revolutionary Left (PRT-IR) of trying to control Corriente Roja.

In the 2009 European elections CR supported and participated in Iniciativa Internacionalista (II-SP), a coalition of the Basque Abertzale Left, Izquierda Castellana, Galician People's Front and different anticapitalist parties and organizations of all Spain led by the writer and playwright Alfonso Sastre. II-SP obtained 178 121 votes (1.15% of the total vote) and no seats in the European Parliament.

In the Catalan elections of 2010 CR supported and joined Des de Baix (From Below in Catalan language). Des de Baix was also supported by Anticapitalist Left, In Struggle and Internationalist Struggle. The coalition gained 7 169 votes (0.23% of the total), failing to obtain any seats in the Parliament of Catalonia.

In the summer of 2011, the organization underwent a split, when one part of the original founders accused the PRT-IR, of deciding, in April of that year, to dissolve the party within Corriente Roja, of wanting to turn CR in the Spanish section of the trotskyist International Workers' League - Fourth International in Spain. Ángeles Maestro while the majority of the founders of the organization left CR and formed Red Roja. Corriente Roja officially joined the International Workers' League - Fourth International, adopting Trotskyism as the official ideology of the organization. Corriente Roja adopted, since 2012, some very controversial stances on international conflicts, for example, being one of the few left-wing parties in Spain to support the Syrian rebels or the struggle against Kadafi in Libya. According to them, this does not mean that the Red Current supported capitalist imperialism as the Stalinists and others of its detractors claim.

In the 2012 Catalan regional election, Corriente Roja gave critical support to the Popular Unity Candidacy (CUP). It left the CUP in February 2016 because of its opposition to the party allowing the formation of a government led by Democratic Convergence of Catalonia (CDC) and Republican Left of Catalonia (ERC).

In 2014 and 2019 Corriente Roja contested the European elections in Spain independently and gained 4,980 (0,03%) and 8,402 (0,04%) votes respectively.
