= United Socialist Workers' Party (Argentina) =

United Socialist Workers' Party Partido Socialista de los Trabajadores Unificado
- Abbreviation: PSTU
- Founded: 2011
- Ideology: Communism; Trotskyism; Morenism
- National affiliation: Workers' Left Front
- International affiliation: IWLfi

The United Socialist Workers' Party (Partido Socialista de los Trabajadores Unificado, PSTU) is the Argentine section of the International Workers' League (Fourth International) (LIT), a Trotskyist-Morenoist grouping.

It was formed in 2011 by the fusion of the FOS and the COI, two groups associated with the LIT.
