= Pirate Party (Spain) =

Pirate Party Partido Pirata (PIRATA)
- President: Daniel Alfredo Bonfils
- Secretary-General: Ricardo Senovilla
- Treasurer: Fergus Reig
- Founded: 6 December 2006
- Dissolved: 28 of June 2022
- Headquarters: Av. de los Reyes de España N° 38; E-30.612 Ulea (Murcia)
- Ideology: Pirate politics Freedom of information Direct democracy
- Political position: Left-wing
- International affiliation: Pirate Parties International
- European political alliance: European Pirate Party
- Local Government: 3 / 67,611

Website
- www.partidopirata.es

The Pirate Party (Spanish: Partido Pirata; short: PIRATA, "Pirate") was a political party in Spain based on the model of the Swedish Pirate Party. It was registered by the Ministry of Interior on 6 December 2006 and removed from the same registry on June 28, 2022.

The party pays attention to citizen's rights and freedom, proposes a reform of the Information Society Services Law of Spain (Spanish: Ley de Servicios de la Sociedad de Información de España - LSSI), and proposes the creation of appropriate legislation for RFID. Furthermore, the party requests the accessibility of culture, and the consideration of the Internet as a basic and neutral service. PIRATA opposes any kind of Internet censorship, as well as any charges on digital media and the Internet. The party favors a declination of private monopolies and software patents. The party also proposes the use of free software in the administration.

== Electoral history ==
=== General elections in Spain, 2011 ===
General elections were held n 20 November 2011; the winner of which was the conservative People's Party. The Pirate Party did not manage to obtain any electoral representation.

==== Congress of Deputies ====
District	Autonomous Community	Vote	Valid Percent	Seats
Navarra	Navarra	1.794	0.54%	0
Castellón	Valencia	999	0.33%	0
Teruel	Aragón	219	0.28%	0
Huesca	Aragón	397	0.33%	0
Total Submitted		000	0.00%	0
Total State		000	0.00%	0

==== Senate ====
District	Autonomous Community	Cand.1	% C1	Cand.2	% C2	Cand.3	% C3	Seats
Navarre	Navarre	2,273	0.71%	0	0%	000	0.00%	0
Castellon	Valencia	2,316	0.8%	0	0%	000	0.00%	0
Total submitted		000	0.00%	0, 00	0.00%	000	0.00%	0
Total State		000	0.00%	0.00	0.00%	000	0.00%	0

== See also ==
- Pirate Party (Sweden)
- Pirate Party of Catalonia
- Pirate Party of Galicia
