= The Peoples Decide =

The Peoples Decide: Los Pueblos Deciden (Spanish); Os Pobos Deciden (Galician); Herriek Erabaki (Basque); Os Pueblos Deciden (Aragonese); Los Pueblos Deciden (Asturian)
- Abbreviation: LPD
- Leader: Josu Juaristi; Ana Miranda Paz
- Founded: 2014
- Dissolved: 2019
- Preceded by: Europe of the Peoples–Greens; Internationalist Initiative–Solidarity among Peoples
- Succeeded by: Ahora Repúblicas
- Ideology: Independence movements Socialism; Euroscepticism; Left-wing nationalism
- Political position: Left-wing

The Peoples Decide (Spanish: Los Pueblos Deciden; Galician: Os Pobos Deciden; Basque: Herriek Erabaki; Aragonese: Os Pueblos Deciden; Asturian: Los Pueblos Deciden, LPD) was a Spanish electoral list in the European Parliament election in 2014 made up from left-wing pro-independence parties. It included Basque Country Gather (EH Bildu) together with Gorripidea, the Galician Nationalist Bloc (BNG), Andecha Astur (AA), Puyalón de Cuchas (Puyalón), Unity of the People (UP) and Canarian Nationalist Alternative (ANC).

The head of the list was Josu Juaristi (EH Bildu) followed by Ana Miranda Paz (BNG). The writer Suso de Toro was also present in the list, within the quota of the BNG. In the case LPD won a single seat, EH Bildu and the BNG agreed to divide the legislature based on the votes of the list in the Basque Country, Navarre and Galicia.

== Composition ==
Party	Scope
Basque Country Gather (EH Bildu)	Basque Country, Navarre
Galician Nationalist Bloc (BNG)	Galicia
Andecha Astur (AA)	Asturias
Puyalón de Cuchas (Puyalón)	Aragon
Unity of the People (UP)	Canary Islands
Canarian Nationalist Alternative (ANC)	Canary Islands

== Electoral performance ==
=== European Parliament ===
European Parliament
Election	Vote	%	Score	Seats	+/–
2014	326,464	2.08%	9th	1 / 54	1
