= Iniciativa Internacionalista =

Internationalist Initiative–Solidarity among Peoples Iniciativa Internacionalista-La Solidaridad entre los Pueblos
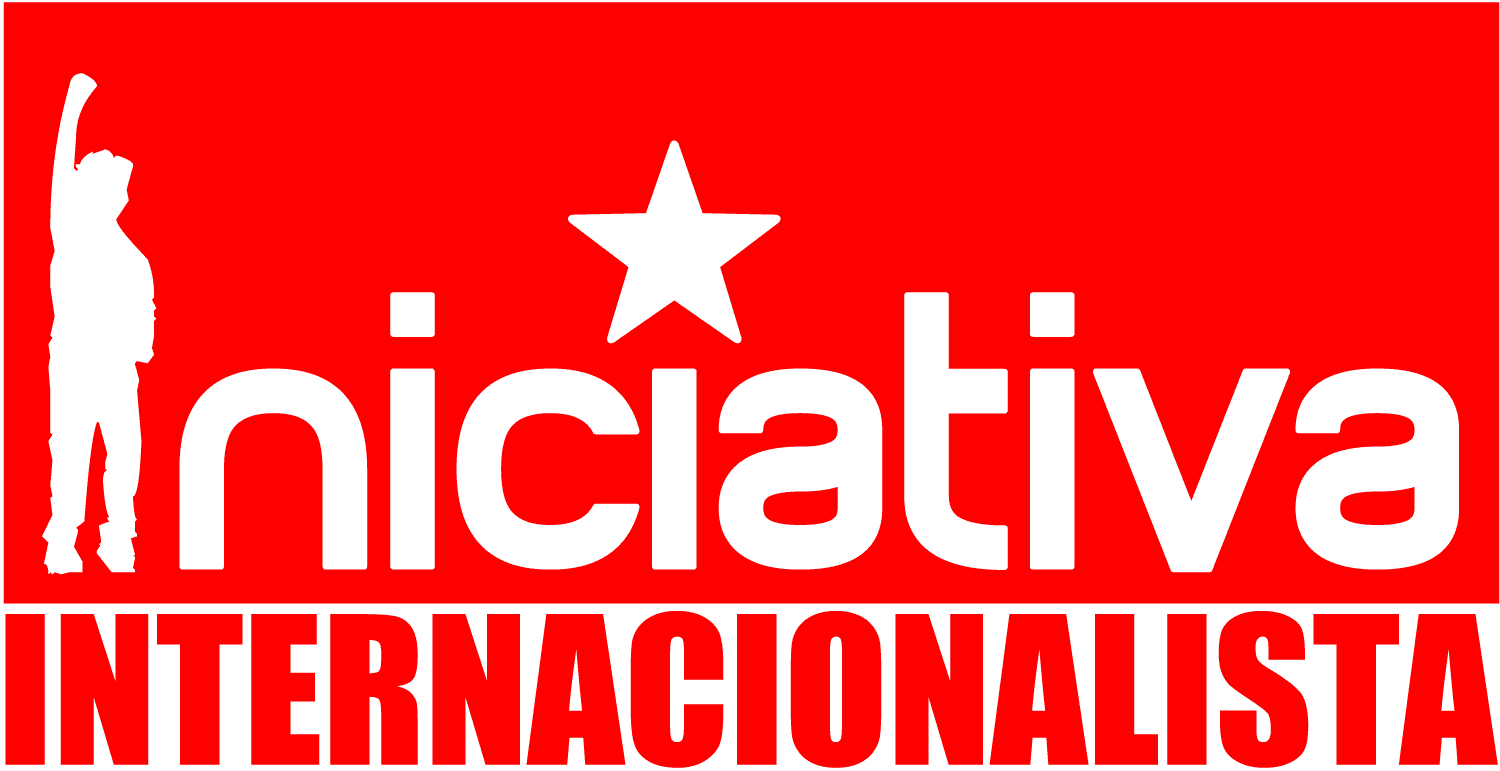
- Leader: Alfonso Sastre
- Founded: 2009
- Merger of: Izquierda Castellana; Comuner@s
- Succeeded by: The Peoples Decide
- Ideology: Revolutionary socialism Communism; Left-wing nationalism Feminism; Independentism; Anti-capitalism; Internationalism
- Colours: Red

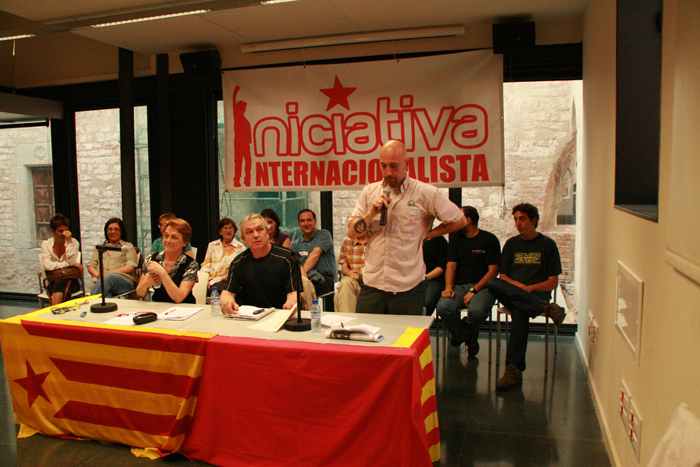
First act of Iniciativa Internacionlista in Barcelona

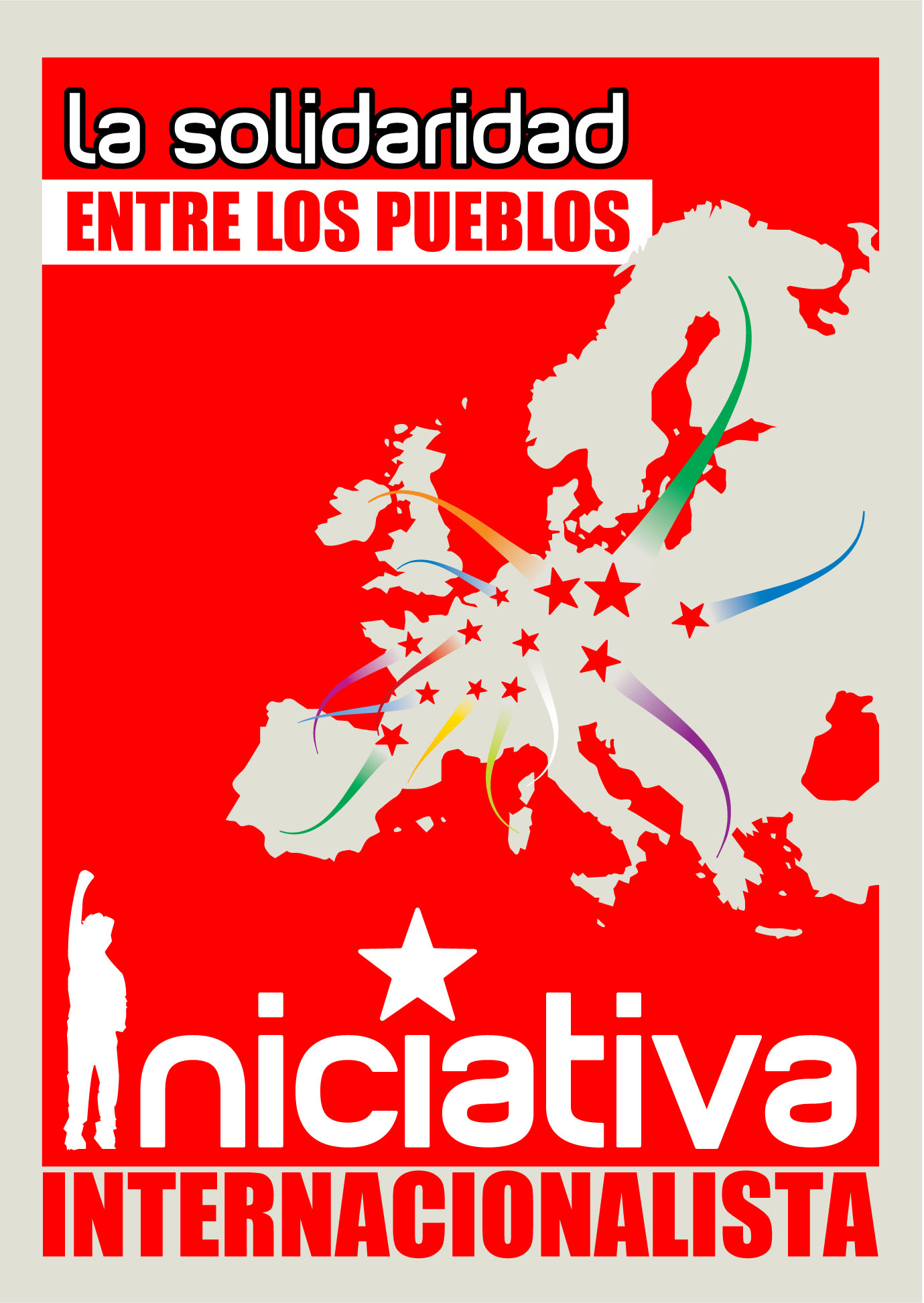
Propaganda poster

Internationalist Initiative–Solidarity among Peoples (II–SP) (Spanish: Iniciativa Internacionalista–La Solidaridad entre los Pueblos, Basque: Iniziatiba Internazionalista - Herrien Elkartasuna, Catalan: Iniciativa Internacionalista – La Solidaritat entre els Pobles, Galician: Iniciativa Internacionalista – A Solidariedade entre os Pobos) was a radical left political coalition from Spain.

== Members ==
Organisation	Ideology
Candidatura Unitaria de Trabajadores (CUT)	Libertarian-communism, Andalusian nationalism
Confederación Intersindical Galega (CIG)	Anti-capitalism, Galician nationalism
Corriente Roja (CR)	Trotskyism
Cucha Independentista Aragonesa (CIA)	Anti-capitalism, Aragonese nationalism
Democracia Tres Millones (D3M)	Abertzale left, Basque nationalism
Endavant	Anti-capitalism, Catalan nationalism
Frente Popular Galega (FPG)	Marxism-Leninism, Galician nationalism
Frente Sindical Obrero de Canarias (FSOC)	Anti-capitalism, Canarian nationalism
Izquierda Castellana (IzCa)	Socialism, Castilian nationalism
Lucha Internacionalista (LI)	Trotskyism
Movimiento Gallego al Socialismo (MGS)	Marxism-Leninism, Galician nationalism
Partido Comunista do Povo Galego (PCPG)	Marxism-Leninism, Galician nationalism
Unidad del Pueblo (UP)	Anti-capitalism, Canarian nationalism

== History ==
The coalition was banned by the Supreme Court 2009 May, after press reports linked some of its candidates with the banned Basque separatist party Batasuna. Days later, on 22 May, the Constitutional Court cancelled the previous decision.

The goals of the candidature were social justice, full democratic liberties, opposition to discrimination by reason of gender, and the right of self-determination of some of Spain's nationalities. The head of the European Parliament elections list was Alfonso Sastre, a well-known Spanish language playwright. The second candidate on the list was IzCa leader Doris Benegas Haddad and, at number 10, is Alicia Hermida, a well-known Spanish actress.

The coalition gained 178,121 votes (1,12%), but no seats in the European Parliament. The best results of the coalition were in the Basque Country (16%) and Navarre (11,4%). Almost eight in ten votes for II-SP were cast in those two regions.

After failing to win any seats, the II-SP disappeared. However the coalition of The Peoples Decide shares the II-SP membership of left-wing separatist and regionalist parties.

== Electoral performance ==
=== European Parliament ===
European Parliament
Election	Vote	%	Seats
2009	178,121 (#7)	1.12	0 / 54
