= International Workers League – Fourth International =

Morenist Trotskyist international organization

International Workers League (Fourth International)
- Liga Internacional de los Trabajadores (Cuarta Internacional)
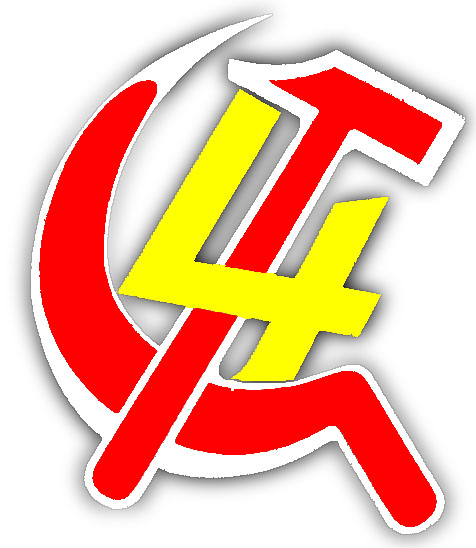
- Logo of the International Workers League (Fourth International)

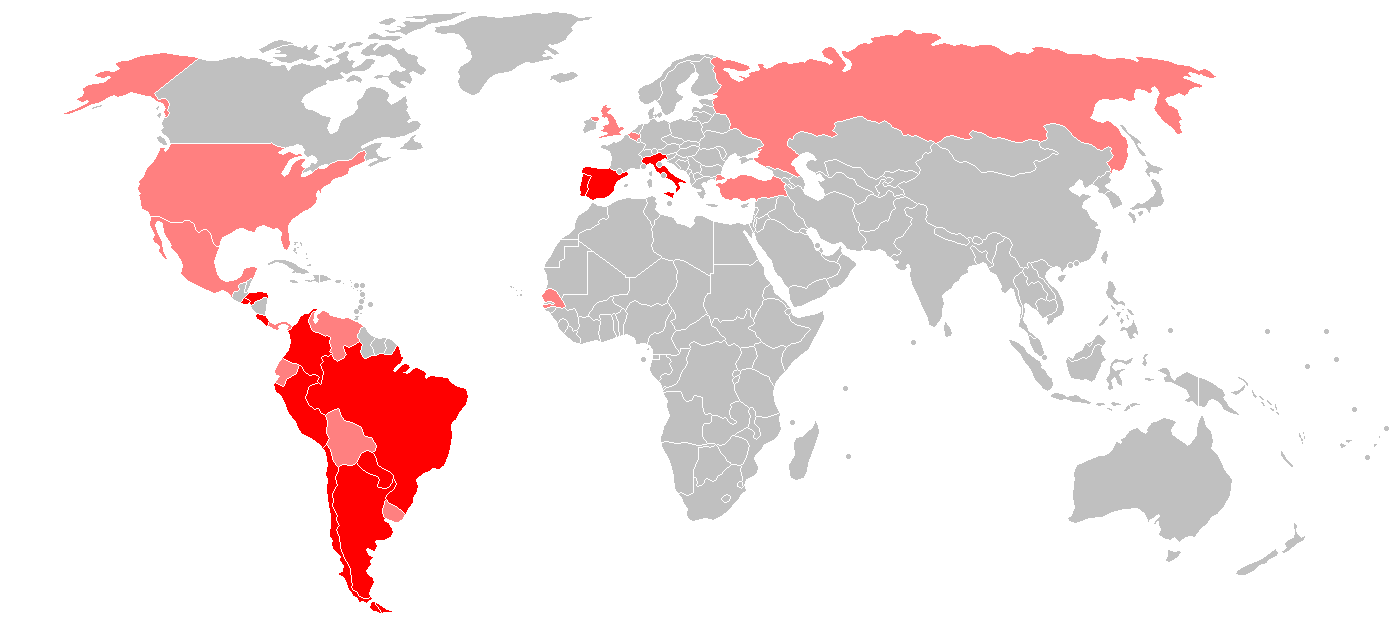
- Countries with Sections of the LITci (Red) or Sympathizing Sections of the LITci (Pink)
- Abbreviation: LITci
- Predecessor: International Committee of the Fourth International
- Established: 1982
- Type: Trotskyist International
- Headquarters: Buenos Aires
- Members: 15 affiliated groups
- Website: litci.org

The International Workers League (Fourth International) (Spanish: Liga Internacional de los Trabajadores (Cuarta Internacional), or LITci; Portuguese: Liga Internacional dos Trabalhadores - Quarta Internacional, or LIT-QI), also known as IWLfi, is a Morenist Trotskyist international organisation.

== Overview ==
The group's origins lie in the International Committee of the Fourth International (ICFI). Moreno's supporters followed the American Socialist Workers Party in leaving the ICFI in 1963 to form the reunified Fourth International (USFI). In 1969, the USFI voted to support guerrilla war in Latin America. Moreno's group opposed this.

While critical of the Sandinistas, Moreno's group sent a Simon Bolivar Brigade to Nicaragua to aid the Civil War, with the aim of building a revolutionary party there. This brigade was opposed by the reunified Fourth International because it operated outside the discipline of the FSLN; the only other Trotskyists to participate were Pierre Lamberts' Organising Committee for the Reconstruction of the Fourth International. Forty non-Nicaraguan members of the Brigade were expelled from the country by the FSLN. Almost immediately, Moreno's and Lambert's tendencies joined to form the Parity Committee for the Reconstruction of the Fourth International. However, Moreno's supporters withdrew in 1981 complaining that Lambert had links to trade union bureaucrats, and in 1982 formed the "International Workers League (Fourth International)". In addition to their former supporters, this also attracted groups in Peru and Venezuela which split from the Lambertist currents.

The group campaigned for the victory of Argentina in the Falklands War, for the non-payment of foreign debt, and for the "defeat of imperialism in the Gulf War." In the mid-1990s, it helped launch Workers' Aid to Bosnia and began working with the Workers International to Rebuild the Fourth International, although that group is now inactive.

Disagreements following the death of Moreno led several sections to leave the international, while others split. Those who left founded the International Centre of Orthodox Trotskyism (CITO in Spanish). The majority of this group rejoined the International Workers League in 2005, the minority forming the International Socialist League.

In 2021 the Chilean section of the IWLfi elected a member to the constitutional convention. María Rivera was elected in district 8 (Santiago West) as part of The List of the People.

The LITci publishes the bulletin International Courier (Correo Internacional) and the journal Marxism Alive (Marxismo Vivo or Le Marxisme Vivant), both in various languages, principally Spanish.

== The 16th International Congress ==
The 16th International Congress of the LIT-CI, in September 2025, resulted in two major splits. The departed sections have created two new international groupings: International Revolutionary Workers' Current – Fourth International (CORI-QI) and the International Committee for the Reconstruction of the LIT of Nahuel Moreno (CIR).

In addition, the sections that did not leave the LIT-CI also suffered splits, including a major split of the United Socialist Workers' Party (Brazil) which gave rise to the Movement for a Revolutionary Party (MPR). In December 2025 the LITci lost its Peruvian section.

== Sections ==
=== Official sections ===
Country	Section Name
Argentina	United Socialist Workers' Party (Argentina)
Brazil	United Socialist Workers' Party
Colombia	Socialist Workers Party (Colombia)
Honduras	Socialist Workers Party (Honduras)
Italy	Communist Alternative Party
Paraguay	Workers' Party (Paraguay)
Portugal	In Struggle (Portugal)
Spain	Corriente Roja

=== Sympathizing sections ===
Country	Section Name
Belgium	Communist Workers' League (Belgium)
Bolivia	Socialist Struggle (Bolivia)
Ecuador	Movement for Socialism (Ecuador)
Mexico	Workers Socialist Group
Panama	Workers For Socialism League
Senegal	Senegal Popular League
United Kingdom	International Socialist League (UK)
United States	Workers' Voice/La Voz de los Trabajadores (United States)
Uruguay	Socialist Left of the Workers (Uruguay)
Venezuela	Socialist Unity of Workers (Venezuela)

=== Former sections ===
Country	Section Name
Chile	International Workers' Movement (Chile)
Costa Rica	Workers' Party (Costa Rica)
El Salvador	Socialist Unity of Workers (El Salvador)
Peru	Socialist Workers Party (Peru)
United States	Corriente Obrera (United States)
