= Land Party (Spain) =

Land Party Partido da Terra
- Founded: 25 July 2011
- Headquarters: Galicia
- Newspaper: O Peteiro
- Ideology: Direct democracy Green politics Ruralism; Reintegrationism; Cooperativism; Horizontalidad
- Colours: Blue; Green

Website
- partidodaterra.net

The Land Party (Galician: Partido da Terra, pronounced [paɾˈtiðʊ ðɐ ˈtɛrɐ]) is a Galician political party that was established in 2011.

== Party platform ==
The party's platform encompasses eight types of sovereignty:

- citizen sovereignty, which calls for a political reform based on direct democracy, incorporating advanced proposals of participatory democracy;
- territorial sovereignty, where a localist administrative reform that builds upon communalism, libertarian municipalism and cellular democracy is proposed;
- environmental sovereignty, defending a self-sufficient sustainable living with the application of appropriate technology;
- food and energy sovereignty, calling for food sovereignty through local food consumption and sustainable agriculture;
- economic sovereignty, proposing community-based economics including some cooperativist elements of distributism and green economics;
- social sovereignty, introducing a communitarian ethics of care;
- cultural sovereignty, emphasizing Galicia's Atlantic connections and bioregionalism; and
- linguistic sovereignty, with an explicit support for linguistic reintegrationism and closer ties with the Lusophone or Portuguese-speaking world.

The party also has an advanced platform regarding peak oil policies and the Oil Depletion Protocol.

== History and elections ==
The party held its founding meeting in Santiago de Compostela on July 25, 2011, Dia Nacional de Galicia ("National Day of Galicia") and was registered by the Spanish Ministry of Interior the same week.

In March 2012, it ran for the Elections to the General Council of the Principality of Asturias, but only in the Western electoral district where the Galician-speaking Eo-Navia region is located, gaining no seats. In October 2012, it contested the Galizan Parliamentary Election obtaining 3,307 votes (0,22%) and ranking as seventh extraparliamentary party (second among the votes issued by Galician citizens abroad) out of a total of 26 groups running in the elections. In May 2014, it contested the European Parliament Election receiving 9,940 votes in the whole of Spain, although the highest proportion of votes was obtained in Galicia. In the local elections of 2015, the party gained a councillor in Lousame.

== See also ==
- Agrarianism
- Agroecology
- Back-to-the-land movement
- Communalism (political philosophy)
- Conservationism
- cooperativism
- Eco-communalism
- Environmentalism
- Green politics
- Inclusive Democracy
- Open-source governance
- Outline of green politics
- Participatory politics
- Permaculture
- Radical transparency
- Reintegrationism
- Self-sufficiency
- Social ecology
