= Results of the 2009 European Parliament election in Spain =

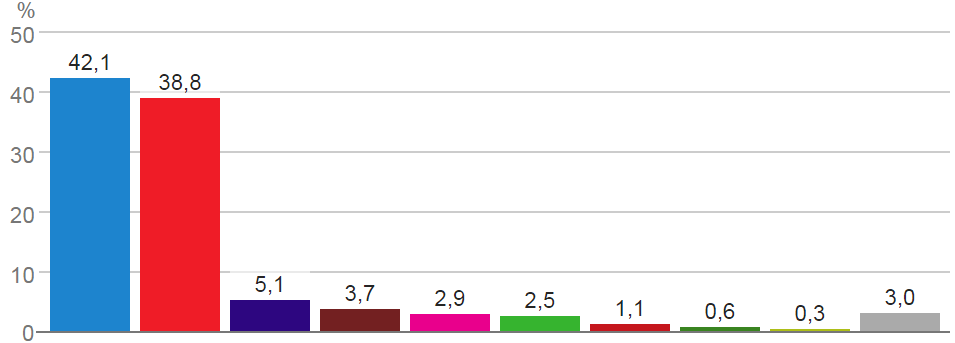
(Spain)	Main: 2009 European Parliament election in Spain
← 2004 7 June 2009 2014 →
Party		Votes	%	Seats
	PP	6,670,377	42.1%	24
	PSOE	6,141,784	38.8%	23
	CEU	808,246	5.1%	3
	IU–ICV	588,248	3.7%	2
	UPyD	451,866	2.9%	1
	EdP–V	394,938	2.5%	1
	II–SP	178,121	1.1%	0
	LV–GVE	89,147	0.6%	0
	PACMA	41,913	0.3%	0
	Others	471,127	3.0%	0
Total		15,835,767	100.0%	54

This article presents the results breakdown of the election to the European Parliament held in Spain on 7 June 2009. The following tables show detailed results in each of the country's 17 autonomous communities and in the autonomous cities of Ceuta and Melilla.

== Nationwide ==
← Summary of the 7 June 2009 European Parliament election results in Spain →
Parties and alliances	Popular vote			Seats	
Parties and alliances	Votes	%	±pp	Total	+/−
People's Party (PP)^{1}	6,670,377	42.12	+0.91	24	±0
Spanish Socialist Workers' Party (PSOE)^{1}	6,141,784	38.78	−4.68	23	−2
Coalition for Europe (CEU)^{1} ^{2}	808,246	5.10	−0.12	3	+1
United Left–Initiative for Catalonia Greens: The Left (IU–ICV)	588,248	3.71	−0.44	2	±0
Union, Progress and Democracy (UPyD)	451,866	2.85	New	1	+1
Europe of the Peoples–Greens (EdP–V)^{3}	394,938	2.49	−0.95	1	±0
Internationalist Initiative–Solidarity among Peoples (II–SP)	178,121	1.12	New	0	±0
The Greens–European Green Group (LV–GVE)	89,147	0.56	+0.12	0	±0
Anti-Bullfighting Party Against Mistreatment of Animals (PACMA)	41,913	0.26	New	0	±0
For a Fairer World (PUM+J)	24,507	0.15	+0.09	0	±0
Libertas–Citizens of Spain (Libertas)	22,903	0.14	New	0	±0
Anti-capitalist Left–Global Revolt (IzAn–RG)	19,735	0.12	New	0	±0
Spanish Alternative (AES)	19,583	0.12	New	0	±0
Communist Party of the Peoples of Spain (PCPE)	15,221	0.10	+0.07	0	±0
Socialist Party of Andalusia (PSA)^{4}	13,993	0.09	+0.05	0	±0
Internationalist Socialist Workers' Party (POSI)	12,344	0.08	+0.03	0	±0
Family and Life Party (PFyV)	10,456	0.07	+0.02	0	±0
Democratic and Social Centre (CDS)	10,144	0.06	−0.02	0	±0
Spanish Phalanx of the CNSO (FE de las JONS)	10,031	0.06	+0.03	0	±0
National Democracy (DN)	9,950	0.06	+0.02	0	±0
Feminist Initiative (IFem)	9,721	0.06	New	0	±0
National Front (FrN)	7,970	0.05	New	0	±0
Catalan Republican Party (RC)	7,547	0.05	New	0	±0
Humanist Party (PH)	7,009	0.04	+0.01	0	±0
Valencian Union (UV)^{5}	6,072	0.04	−0.01	0	±0
Republican Social Movement (MSR)	6,009	0.04	New	0	±0
Internationalist Solidarity and Self-Management (SAIn)	5,877	0.04	New	0	±0
Liberal Democratic Centre (CDL)	5,733	0.04	New	0	±0
Authentic Phalanx (FA)	5,165	0.03	+0.02	0	±0
United Extremadura (EU)^{6}	5,007	0.03	+0.02	0	±0
Regionalist Party of the Leonese Country (PREPAL)	4,767	0.03	+0.01	0	±0
Communist Unification of Spain (UCE)	3,483	0.02	New	0	±0
Asturian Nationalist Unity (UNA)	3,183	0.02	New	0	±0
Andecha Astur (AA)	2,255	0.01	New	0	±0
Liberal Centrist Union (UCL)	1,991	0.01	±0.00	0	±0
Blank ballots	220,471	1.39	+0.78		
Total^{1}	15,835,767			54	±0
Valid votes	15,835,767	99.38	+0.36		
Invalid votes	99,380	0.62	−0.36		
Votes cast / turnout	15,935,147	44.90	−0.24		
Abstentions	19,557,420	55.10	+0.24		
Registered voters	35,492,567				
Sources
Footnotes: ^{1} Initially, Spain was allocated 50 seats, which were distributed as follows: PP (23), PSOE (21), CEU (2), IU–ICV (2), UPyD (1) and EdP–V (1). However, as a result of the Treaty of Lisbon, Spain's MEP delegation grew to 54, with the additional 4 seats being allocated to PP (1), PSOE (2) and CEU (1).; ^{2} Coalition for Europe results are compared to the combined totals of Galeusca–Peoples of Europe—not including results in the Balearic Islands and Galicia—and European Coalition in Andalusia, Balearic Islands and the Canary Islands in the 2004 election.; ^{3} Europe of the Peoples–Greens results are compared to the combined totals of Europe of the Peoples—not including results in Andalusia and Asturias—, Galeusca–Peoples of Europe in Galicia and Aralar in the 2004 election.; ^{4} Socialist Party of Andalusia results are compared to Europe of the Peoples totals in Andalusia in the 2004 election.; ^{5} Valencian Union results are compared to European Coalition totals in the Valencian Community in the 2004 election.; ^{6} United Extremadura results are compared to European Coalition totals in Extremadura in the 2004 election.

== Autonomous communities ==
=== Andalusia ===
← Summary of the 7 June 2009 European Parliament election results in Andalusia →
Parties and alliances	Popular vote		
Parties and alliances	Votes	%	±pp
Spanish Socialist Workers' Party (PSOE)	1,265,633	48.16	−6.22
People's Party (PP)	1,042,114	39.65	+3.53
United Left/The Greens–Assembly for Andalusia: The Left (IULV–CA)	136,916	5.21	+0.16
Union, Progress and Democracy (UPyD)	66,676	2.54	New
Andalusian Party (Coalition for Europe) (PA)	26,556	1.01	−1.56
Socialist Party of Andalusia (PSA)	9,649	0.37	+0.11
The Greens–European Green Group (LV–GVE)	8,275	0.31	+0.06
Anti-Bullfighting Party Against Mistreatment of Animals (PACMA)	6,173	0.23	New
The Greens (Europe of the Peoples–Greens) (LV)	5,663	0.22	New
For a Fairer World (PUM+J)	3,538	0.13	+0.08
Anti-capitalist Left–Global Revolt (IzAn–RG)	2,681	0.10	New
Communist Party of the Peoples of Spain (PCPE)	2,592	0.10	+0.08
Libertas–Citizens of Spain (Libertas)	2,543	0.10	New
Internationalist Initiative–Solidarity among Peoples (II–SP)	2,201	0.08	New
Spanish Alternative (AES)	1,908	0.07	New
Internationalist Socialist Workers' Party (POSI)	1,751	0.07	+0.03
Internationalist Solidarity and Self-Management (SAIn)	1,381	0.05	New
Spanish Phalanx of the CNSO (FE de las JONS)	1,357	0.05	+0.03
Family and Life Party (PFyV)	1,307	0.05	+0.02
Feminist Initiative (IFem)	1,253	0.05	New
Republican Social Movement (MSR)	1,215	0.05	New
Democratic and Social Centre (CDS)	1,153	0.04	+0.01
Humanist Party (PH)	1,109	0.04	+0.02
National Front (FrN)	1,078	0.04	New
National Democracy (DN)	1,034	0.04	+0.02
Liberal Democratic Centre (CDL)	969	0.04	New
Authentic Phalanx (FA)	762	0.03	+0.02
Communist Unification of Spain (UCE)	466	0.02	New
United Extremadura (EU)	434	0.02	New
Catalan Republican Party (RC)	406	0.02	New
Regionalist Party of the Leonese Country (PREPAL)	309	0.01	±0.00
Asturian Nationalist Unity (UNA)	285	0.01	New
Liberal Centrist Union (UCL)	253	0.01	±0.00
Andecha Astur (AA)	207	0.01	New
Valencian Union (UV)	202	0.01	New
Blank ballots	27,937	1.06	+0.57
Total	2,627,986		
Valid votes	2,627,986	99.52	−0.27
Invalid votes	12,602	0.48	+0.27
Votes cast / turnout	2,640,588	41.74	+0.86
Abstentions	3,685,101	58.26	−0.86
Registered voters	6,325,689		

=== Aragon ===
← Summary of the 7 June 2009 European Parliament election results in Aragon →
Parties and alliances	Popular vote		
Parties and alliances	Votes	%	±pp
Spanish Socialist Workers' Party (PSOE)	206,713	43.96	−1.88
People's Party (PP)	196,056	41.69	+1.73
United Left of Aragon: The Left (IU)	16,573	3.52	+0.46
Union, Progress and Democracy (UPyD)	14,956	3.18	New
Aragonese Union (Europe of the Peoples–Greens) (CHA)	13,353	2.84	−3.29
The Greens–European Green Group (LV–GVE)	3,415	0.73	+0.47
Anti-Bullfighting Party Against Mistreatment of Animals (PACMA)	1,167	0.25	New
Internationalist Initiative–Solidarity among Peoples (II–SP)	957	0.20	New
For a Fairer World (PUM+J)	742	0.16	+0.12
Spanish Alternative (AES)	715	0.15	New
Libertas–Citizens of Spain (Libertas)	662	0.14	New
Anti-capitalist Left–Global Revolt (IzAn–RG)	614	0.13	New
Coalition for Europe (CEU)^{1}	465	0.10	+0.04
Spanish Phalanx of the CNSO (FE de las JONS)	441	0.09	+0.06
Internationalist Socialist Workers' Party (POSI)	427	0.09	+0.03
Democratic and Social Centre (CDS)	397	0.08	+0.04
National Democracy (DN)	394	0.08	+0.03
Communist Party of the Peoples of Spain (PCPE)	355	0.08	+0.07
National Front (FrN)	354	0.08	New
Family and Life Party (PFyV)	349	0.07	±0.00
Feminist Initiative (IFem)	274	0.06	New
Authentic Phalanx (FA)	233	0.05	+0.04
Liberal Democratic Centre (CDL)	191	0.04	New
Humanist Party (PH)	186	0.04	+0.02
Republican Social Movement (MSR)	186	0.04	New
Internationalist Solidarity and Self-Management (SAIn)	157	0.03	New
Socialist Party of Andalusia (PSA)	125	0.03	New
Communist Unification of Spain (UCE)	111	0.02	New
Catalan Republican Party (RC)	109	0.02	New
United Extremadura (EU)	80	0.02	New
Regionalist Party of the Leonese Country (PREPAL)	60	0.01	±0.00
Liberal Centrist Union (UCL)	54	0.01	±0.00
Asturian Nationalist Unity (UNA)	43	0.01	New
Andecha Astur (AA)	42	0.01	New
Valencian Union (UV)	37	0.01	New
Blank ballots	9,267	1.97	+1.17
Total	470,260		
Valid votes	470,260	99.34	−0.36
Invalid votes	3,106	0.66	+0.36
Votes cast / turnout	473,366	46.44	−0.90
Abstentions	545,917	53.56	+0.90
Registered voters	1,019,283		
Sources
Footnotes: ^{1} Coalition for Europe results are compared to Galeusca–Peoples of Europe totals in the 2004 election.

=== Asturias ===
← Summary of the 7 June 2009 European Parliament election results in Asturias →
Parties and alliances	Popular vote		
Parties and alliances	Votes	%	±pp
Spanish Socialist Workers' Party (PSOE)	189,783	44.05	−2.34
People's Party (PP)	180,936	42.00	−2.37
United Left of Asturias–Bloc for Asturias: The Left (IU–BA)	24,337	5.65	−0.65
Union, Progress and Democracy (UPyD)	17,721	4.11	New
The Greens–European Green Group (LV–GVE)	2,089	0.48	±0.00
Asturian Nationalist Unity (UNA)	1,155	0.27	New
Anti-Bullfighting Party Against Mistreatment of Animals (PACMA)	1,029	0.24	New
Internationalist Initiative–Solidarity among Peoples (II–SP)	843	0.20	New
Communist Party of the Peoples of Spain (PCPE)	816	0.19	+0.15
Andecha Astur (AA)	806	0.19	New
Europe of the Peoples–Greens (EdP–V)^{1}	718	0.17	−0.21
National Democracy (DN)	531	0.12	+0.10
For a Fairer World (PUM+J)	461	0.11	+0.05
Anti-capitalist Left–Global Revolt (IzAn–RG)	389	0.09	New
National Front (FrN)	331	0.08	New
Libertas–Citizens of Spain (Libertas)	294	0.07	New
Democratic and Social Centre (CDS)	264	0.06	+0.01
Spanish Alternative (AES)	252	0.06	New
Internationalist Socialist Workers' Party (POSI)	238	0.06	±0.00
Feminist Initiative (IFem)	226	0.05	New
Spanish Phalanx of the CNSO (FE de las JONS)	194	0.05	+0.03
Family and Life Party (PFyV)	179	0.04	+0.02
Internationalist Solidarity and Self-Management (SAIn)	178	0.04	New
Coalition for Europe (CEU)^{2}	120	0.03	−0.03
Socialist Party of Andalusia (PSA)	112	0.03	New
Humanist Party (PH)	108	0.03	+0.01
Regionalist Party of the Leonese Country (PREPAL)	106	0.02	+0.01
Republican Social Movement (MSR)	91	0.02	New
Authentic Phalanx (FA)	88	0.02	+0.01
Liberal Democratic Centre (CDL)	88	0.02	New
Catalan Republican Party (RC)	61	0.01	New
Communist Unification of Spain (UCE)	59	0.01	New
Liberal Centrist Union (UCL)	45	0.01	±0.00
United Extremadura (EU)	44	0.01	New
Valencian Union (UV)	14	0.00	New
Blank ballots	6,083	1.41	+0.68
Total	430,789		
Valid votes	430,789	99.37	−0.38
Invalid votes	2,724	0.63	+0.38
Votes cast / turnout	433,513	44.14	−0.76
Abstentions	548,616	55.86	+0.76
Registered voters	982,129		
Sources
Footnotes: ^{1} Europe of the Peoples–Greens results are compared to Europe of the Peoples totals in the 2004 election.; ^{2} Coalition for Europe results are compared to Galeusca–Peoples of Europe totals in the 2004 election.

=== Balearic Islands ===
← Summary of the 7 June 2009 European Parliament election results in the Balearic Islands →
Parties and alliances	Popular vote		
Parties and alliances	Votes	%	±pp
People's Party (PP)	112,666	43.74	−2.83
Spanish Socialist Workers' Party (PSOE)	99,574	38.66	−0.10
Majorcan Union–Menorcan Union (Coalition for Europe) (UM–UMe)	9,819	3.81	+0.70
Republican Left–Agreement (Europe of the Peoples–Greens) (esquerra–ExM)	7,651	2.97	+0.10
Union, Progress and Democracy (UPyD)	7,126	2.77	New
United Left of the Balearic Islands–The Greens: The Left (EU–EV)	6,756	2.62	+0.26
The Greens–European Green Group (LV–GVE)	2,657	1.03	+0.13
Internationalist Initiative–Solidarity among Peoples (II–SP)	1,561	0.61	New
Anti-Bullfighting Party Against Mistreatment of Animals (PACMA)	901	0.35	New
Family and Life Party (PFyV)	477	0.19	+0.16
For a Fairer World (PUM+J)	467	0.18	+0.13
Libertas–Citizens of Spain (Libertas)	311	0.12	New
Anti-capitalist Left–Global Revolt (IzAn–RG)	258	0.10	New
Internationalist Socialist Workers' Party (POSI)	250	0.10	+0.01
Communist Party of the Peoples of Spain (PCPE)	246	0.10	+0.08
Spanish Phalanx of the CNSO (FE de las JONS)	229	0.09	+0.05
Catalan Republican Party (RC)	191	0.07	New
Feminist Initiative (IFem)	185	0.07	New
National Democracy (DN)	170	0.07	+0.02
Democratic and Social Centre (CDS)	169	0.07	±0.00
Humanist Party (PH)	147	0.06	+0.04
Spanish Alternative (AES)	144	0.06	New
Authentic Phalanx (FA)	113	0.04	+0.02
Socialist Party of Andalusia (PSA)	96	0.04	New
Regionalist Party of the Leonese Country (PREPAL)	82	0.03	+0.02
Valencian Union (UV)	78	0.03	New
Communist Unification of Spain (UCE)	76	0.03	New
Liberal Democratic Centre (CDL)	75	0.03	New
National Front (FrN)	56	0.02	New
Asturian Nationalist Unity (UNA)	49	0.02	New
United Extremadura (EU)	47	0.02	New
Internationalist Solidarity and Self-Management (SAIn)	46	0.02	New
Republican Social Movement (MSR)	43	0.02	New
Liberal Centrist Union (UCL)	42	0.02	+0.01
Andecha Astur (AA)	40	0.02	New
Blank ballots	4,776	1.85	+1.20
Total	257,574		
Valid votes	257,574	99.18	−0.53
Invalid votes	2,120	0.82	+0.53
Votes cast / turnout	259,694	35.65	−1.96
Abstentions	468,807	64.35	+1.96
Registered voters	728,501		

=== Basque Country ===
← Summary of the 7 June 2009 European Parliament election results in the Basque Country →
Parties and alliances	Popular vote		
Parties and alliances	Votes	%	±pp
Basque Nationalist Party (Coalition for Europe) (EAJ/PNV)	208,432	28.54	−6.74
Socialist Party of the Basque Country–Basque Country Left (PSE–EE (PSOE))	202,885	27.78	−0.45
People's Party (PP)	117,057	16.03	−5.02
Internationalist Initiative–Solidarity among Peoples (II–SP)	116,827	16.00	New
Independentists and Leftists (Europe of the Peoples–Greens) (Aralar–EA)^{1}	41,140	5.63	−3.39
United Left–Greens: The Left (EB–B)	13,229	1.81	−2.36
Union, Progress and Democracy (UPyD)	10,963	1.50	New
The Greens–European Green Group (B–ETB/LV–GVE)	4,109	0.56	+0.21
Anti-Bullfighting Party Against Mistreatment of Animals (PACMA)	1,599	0.22	New
For a Fairer World (PUM+J)	1,551	0.21	+0.11
Anti-capitalist Left–Global Revolt (IzAn–RG)	1,094	0.15	New
Family and Life Party (PFyV)	757	0.10	+0.04
Feminist Initiative (IFem)	665	0.09	New
Internationalist Socialist Workers' Party (POSI)	549	0.08	±0.00
Communist Party of the Peoples of Spain–Basque Communists (PCPE–EK)	547	0.07	±0.00
Libertas–Citizens of Spain (Libertas)	491	0.07	New
Internationalist Solidarity and Self-Management (SAIn)	296	0.04	New
Democratic and Social Centre (CDS)	255	0.03	−0.02
Humanist Party (PH)	247	0.03	−0.01
National Democracy (DN)	246	0.03	±0.00
Spanish Alternative (AES)	242	0.03	New
Republican Social Movement (MSR)	227	0.03	New
Spanish Phalanx of the CNSO (FE de las JONS)	196	0.03	+0.02
Communist Unification of Spain (UCE)	190	0.03	New
Regionalist Party of the Leonese Country (PREPAL)	177	0.02	±0.00
Socialist Party of Andalusia (PSA)	177	0.02	New
United Extremadura (EU)	169	0.02	New
National Front (FrN)	118	0.02	New
Liberal Democratic Centre (CDL)	112	0.02	New
Catalan Republican Party (RC)	98	0.01	New
Asturian Nationalist Unity (UNA)	92	0.01	New
Authentic Phalanx (FA)	86	0.01	±0.00
Andecha Astur (AA)	69	0.01	New
Liberal Centrist Union (UCL)	64	0.01	±0.00
Valencian Union (UV)	45	0.01	New
Blank ballots	5,385	0.74	+0.15
Total	730,386		
Valid votes	730,386	99.62	+11.83
Invalid votes	2,782	0.38	−11.83
Votes cast / turnout	733,168	41.23	−3.36
Abstentions	1,045,021	58.77	+3.36
Registered voters	1,778,189		
Sources
Footnotes: ^{1} Independentists and Leftists–Europe of the Peoples–Greens results are compared to the combined totals of Basque Solidarity and Aralar in the 2004 election.

=== Canary Islands ===
← Summary of the 7 June 2009 European Parliament election results in the Canary Islands →
Parties and alliances	Popular vote		
Parties and alliances	Votes	%	±pp
People's Party (PP)	247,869	40.78	+0.79
Spanish Socialist Workers' Party (PSOE)	218,968	36.02	−1.48
Canarian Coalition (Coalition for Europe) (CC)	96,297	15.84	−1.08
Canarian United Left: The Left (IUC)	9,669	1.59	−0.25
Union, Progress and Democracy (UPyD)	7,256	1.19	New
The Greens–European Green Group (LV–GVE)	5,053	0.83	+0.01
The Greens (Europe of the Peoples–Greens) (LV)	2,991	0.49	New
Anti-Bullfighting Party Against Mistreatment of Animals (PACMA)	1,433	0.24	New
Internationalist Initiative–Solidarity among Peoples (II–SP)	1,111	0.18	New
For a Fairer World (PUM+J)	1,013	0.17	+0.12
Communist Party of the Peoples of Spain (PCPE)	858	0.14	+0.10
Spanish Alternative (AES)	713	0.12	New
Feminist Initiative (IFem)	595	0.10	New
Anti-capitalist Left–Global Revolt (IzAn–RG)	553	0.09	New
Libertas–Citizens of Spain (Libertas)	547	0.09	New
Internationalist Socialist Workers' Party (POSI)	520	0.09	+0.03
Democratic and Social Centre (CDS)	505	0.08	+0.01
Humanist Party (PH)	406	0.07	+0.04
Liberal Democratic Centre (CDL)	398	0.07	New
Internationalist Solidarity and Self-Management (SAIn)	374	0.06	New
Family and Life Party (PFyV)	312	0.05	+0.02
Republican Social Movement (MSR)	304	0.05	New
National Democracy (DN)	289	0.05	+0.01
National Front (FrN)	270	0.04	New
Spanish Phalanx of the CNSO (FE de las JONS)	260	0.04	+0.01
Socialist Party of Andalusia (PSA)	213	0.04	New
Authentic Phalanx (FA)	209	0.03	+0.02
Communist Unification of Spain (UCE)	149	0.02	New
Catalan Republican Party (RC)	148	0.02	New
United Extremadura (EU)	114	0.02	New
Regionalist Party of the Leonese Country (PREPAL)	108	0.02	−0.01
Liberal Centrist Union (UCL)	106	0.02	+0.01
Asturian Nationalist Unity (UNA)	104	0.02	New
Valencian Union (UV)	104	0.02	New
Andecha Astur (AA)	101	0.02	New
Blank ballots	7,914	1.30	+0.80
Total	607,834		
Valid votes	607,834	99.31	−0.39
Invalid votes	4,247	0.69	+0.39
Votes cast / turnout	612,081	39.23	+2.75
Abstentions	948,325	60.77	−2.75
Registered voters	1,560,406		

=== Cantabria ===
← Summary of the 7 June 2009 European Parliament election results in Cantabria →
Parties and alliances	Popular vote		
Parties and alliances	Votes	%	±pp
People's Party (PP)	125,691	50.72	−1.74
Spanish Socialist Workers' Party (PSOE)	98,907	39.91	−2.35
Union, Progress and Democracy (UPyD)	8,001	3.23	New
United Left: The Left (IU)	4,938	1.99	−0.55
The Greens–European Green Group (LV–GVE)	856	0.35	±0.00
The Greens (Europe of the Peoples–Greens) (LV)	668	0.27	New
National Front (FrN)	594	0.24	New
Anti-Bullfighting Party Against Mistreatment of Animals (PACMA)	541	0.22	New
Internationalist Initiative–Solidarity among Peoples (II–SP)	502	0.20	New
Coalition for Europe (CEU)^{1}	349	0.14	−0.06
For a Fairer World (PUM+J)	280	0.11	+0.06
Communist Party of the Peoples of Spain (PCPE)	278	0.11	+0.08
Spanish Alternative (AES)	269	0.11	New
Libertas–Citizens of Spain (Libertas)	250	0.10	New
Spanish Phalanx of the CNSO (FE de las JONS)	227	0.09	+0.03
Anti-capitalist Left–Global Revolt (IzAn–RG)	219	0.09	New
Internationalist Solidarity and Self-Management (SAIn)	205	0.08	New
Catalan Republican Party (RC)	203	0.08	New
Democratic and Social Centre (CDS)	190	0.08	−0.01
Feminist Initiative (IFem)	188	0.08	New
Internationalist Socialist Workers' Party (POSI)	132	0.05	±0.00
Family and Life Party (PFyV)	110	0.04	+0.02
National Democracy (DN)	100	0.04	+0.01
Humanist Party (PH)	94	0.04	+0.01
Authentic Phalanx (FA)	77	0.03	+0.02
Republican Social Movement (MSR)	63	0.03	New
United Extremadura (EU)	59	0.02	New
Socialist Party of Andalusia (PSA)	54	0.02	New
Liberal Democratic Centre (CDL)	52	0.02	New
Asturian Nationalist Unity (UNA)	52	0.02	New
Regionalist Party of the Leonese Country (PREPAL)	47	0.02	+0.01
Communist Unification of Spain (UCE)	34	0.01	New
Liberal Centrist Union (UCL)	32	0.01	±0.00
Andecha Astur (AA)	24	0.01	New
Valencian Union (UV)	21	0.01	New
Blank ballots	3,514	1.42	+0.59
Total	247,821		
Valid votes	247,821	99.18	−0.32
Invalid votes	2,046	0.82	+0.32
Votes cast / turnout	249,867	50.79	−1.05
Abstentions	242,129	49.21	+1.05
Registered voters	491,996		
Sources
Footnotes: ^{1} Coalition for Europe results are compared to Galeusca–Peoples of Europe totals in the 2004 election.

=== Castile and León ===
← Summary of the 7 June 2009 European Parliament election results in Castile and León →
Parties and alliances	Popular vote		
Parties and alliances	Votes	%	±pp
People's Party (PP)	571,252	51.69	−1.42
Spanish Socialist Workers' Party (PSOE)	422,272	38.21	−3.40
Union, Progress and Democracy (UPyD)	40,420	3.66	New
United Left: The Left (IU)	25,849	2.34	−0.07
The Greens–European Green Group (LV–GVE)	4,672	0.42	+0.03
The Greens (Europe of the Peoples–Greens) (LV)	2,441	0.22	New
Regionalist Party of the Leonese Country (PREPAL)	2,310	0.21	+0.08
Anti-Bullfighting Party Against Mistreatment of Animals (PACMA)	2,242	0.20	New
Internationalist Initiative–Solidarity among Peoples (II–SP)	1,981	0.18	New
Libertas–Citizens of Spain (Libertas)	1,662	0.15	New
For a Fairer World (PUM+J)	1,499	0.14	+0.09
Democratic and Social Centre (CDS)	1,215	0.11	+0.01
National Democracy (DN)	1,162	0.11	+0.08
Anti-capitalist Left–Global Revolt (IzAn–RG)	968	0.09	New
Spanish Alternative (AES)	906	0.08	New
Communist Party of the Peoples of Spain (PCPE)	901	0.08	+0.06
Spanish Phalanx of the CNSO (FE de las JONS)	848	0.08	+0.04
Internationalist Socialist Workers' Party (POSI)	821	0.07	±0.00
Internationalist Solidarity and Self-Management (SAIn)	775	0.07	New
Family and Life Party (PFyV)	671	0.06	+0.02
Feminist Initiative (IFem)	622	0.06	New
Humanist Party (PH)	464	0.04	+0.02
Authentic Phalanx (FA)	389	0.04	+0.02
Liberal Democratic Centre (CDL)	388	0.04	New
National Front (FrN)	363	0.03	New
Coalition for Europe (CEU)^{1}	353	0.03	−0.02
Republican Social Movement (MSR)	298	0.03	New
United Extremadura (EU)	241	0.02	New
Socialist Party of Andalusia (PSA)	218	0.02	New
Liberal Centrist Union (UCL)	206	0.02	−0.02
Communist Unification of Spain (UCE)	159	0.01	New
Catalan Republican Party (RC)	156	0.01	New
Asturian Nationalist Unity (UNA)	126	0.01	New
Andecha Astur (AA)	122	0.01	New
Valencian Union (UV)	88	0.01	New
Blank ballots	16,077	1.45	+0.64
Total	1,105,137		
Valid votes	1,105,137	99.22	−0.43
Invalid votes	8,644	0.78	+0.43
Votes cast / turnout	1,113,781	51.42	−0.83
Abstentions	1,052,268	48.58	+0.83
Registered voters	2,166,049		
Sources
Footnotes: ^{1} Coalition for Europe results are compared to Galeusca–Peoples of Europe totals in the 2004 election.

=== Castilla–La Mancha ===
← Summary of the 7 June 2009 European Parliament election results in Castilla–La Mancha →
Parties and alliances	Popular vote		
Parties and alliances	Votes	%	±pp
People's Party (PP)	407,851	51.45	+1.78
Spanish Socialist Workers' Party (PSOE)	316,538	39.93	−5.88
United Left: The Left (IU)	23,813	3.00	+0.35
Union, Progress and Democracy (UPyD)	20,748	2.62	New
The Greens–European Green Group (LV–GVE)	2,666	0.34	+0.04
The Greens (Europe of the Peoples–Greens) (LV)	1,613	0.20	New
Anti-Bullfighting Party Against Mistreatment of Animals (PACMA)	1,497	0.19	New
For a Fairer World (PUM+J)	910	0.11	+0.07
Spanish Alternative (AES)	880	0.11	New
Libertas–Citizens of Spain (Libertas)	668	0.08	New
Spanish Phalanx of the CNSO (FE de las JONS)	617	0.08	+0.04
Democratic and Social Centre (CDS)	569	0.07	−0.01
Communist Party of the Peoples of Spain (PCPE)	566	0.07	+0.05
Internationalist Initiative–Solidarity among Peoples (II–SP)	459	0.06	New
National Democracy (DN)	425	0.05	+0.02
Family and Life Party (PFyV)	401	0.05	−0.01
Internationalist Socialist Workers' Party (POSI)	399	0.05	+0.02
National Front (FrN)	379	0.05	New
Anti-capitalist Left–Global Revolt (IzAn–RG)	330	0.04	New
Liberal Democratic Centre (CDL)	281	0.04	New
Feminist Initiative (IFem)	280	0.04	New
Authentic Phalanx (FA)	264	0.03	+0.02
Humanist Party (PH)	256	0.03	+0.01
Republican Social Movement (MSR)	182	0.02	New
Coalition for Europe (CEU)^{1}	141	0.02	±0.00
Socialist Party of Andalusia (PSA)	135	0.02	New
United Extremadura (EU)	123	0.02	New
Communist Unification of Spain (UCE)	110	0.01	New
Liberal Centrist Union (UCL)	101	0.01	±0.00
Internationalist Solidarity and Self-Management (SAIn)	101	0.01	New
Catalan Republican Party (RC)	96	0.01	New
Regionalist Party of the Leonese Country (PREPAL)	85	0.01	±0.00
Asturian Nationalist Unity (UNA)	67	0.01	New
Andecha Astur (AA)	48	0.01	New
Valencian Union (UV)	37	0.00	New
Blank ballots	9,014	1.14	+0.55
Total	792,650		
Valid votes	792,650	99.20	−0.44
Invalid votes	6,415	0.80	+0.44
Votes cast / turnout	799,065	51.71	+0.17
Abstentions	746,155	48.29	−0.17
Registered voters	1,545,220		
Sources
Footnotes: ^{1} Coalition for Europe results are compared to Galeusca–Peoples of Europe totals in the 2004 election.

=== Catalonia ===
← Summary of the 7 June 2009 European Parliament election results in Catalonia →
Parties and alliances	Popular vote		
Parties and alliances	Votes	%	±pp
Socialists' Party of Catalonia (PSC–PSOE)	708,888	36.00	−6.85
Convergence and Union (Coalition for Europe) (CiU)	441,810	22.44	+5.00
People's Party (PP)	354,876	18.02	+0.21
Republican Left of Catalonia (Europe of the Peoples–Greens) (ERC)	181,213	9.20	−2.60
Initiative for Catalonia Greens–United and Alternative Left: The Left (ICV–EUiA)	119,755	6.08	−1.09
The Greens–European Green Group (LV–GVE)	19,381	0.98	+0.38
Internationalist Initiative–Solidarity among Peoples (II–SP)	16,792	0.85	New
Union, Progress and Democracy (UPyD)	15,720	0.80	New
Anti-Bullfighting Party Against Mistreatment of Animals (PACMA)	10,771	0.55	New
Libertas–Citizens of Spain (Libertas)	6,999	0.36	New
Catalan Republican Party (RC)	4,891	0.25	New
Anti-capitalist Left–Global Revolt (IzAn–RG)	4,524	0.23	New
Internationalist Socialist Workers' Party (POSI)	3,137	0.16	+0.10
For a Fairer World (PUM+J)	2,881	0.15	+0.09
Communist Party of the Peoples of Spain (PCPE)	2,755	0.14	+0.11
Family and Life Party (PFiV)	2,025	0.10	+0.01
Socialist Party of Andalusia (PSA)	1,853	0.09	New
Feminist Initiative (IFem)	1,707	0.09	New
Spanish Phalanx of the CNSO (FE de las JONS)	1,464	0.07	+0.04
National Democracy (DN)	1,263	0.06	+0.02
Humanist Party (PH)	1,026	0.05	+0.03
Spanish Alternative (AES)	911	0.05	New
Democratic and Social Centre (CDS)	752	0.04	−0.07
Valencian Union (UV)	706	0.04	New
Authentic Phalanx (FA)	705	0.04	+0.03
United Extremadura (EU)	681	0.03	New
Republican Social Movement (MSR)	670	0.03	New
Internationalist Solidarity and Self-Management (SAIn)	657	0.03	New
National Front (FrN)	647	0.03	New
Communist Unification of Spain (UCE)	540	0.03	New
Regionalist Party of the Leonese Country (PREPAL)	459	0.02	±0.00
Asturian Nationalist Unity (UNA)	453	0.02	New
Liberal Democratic Centre (CDL)	323	0.02	New
Liberal Centrist Union (UCL)	258	0.01	±0.00
Andecha Astur (AA)	253	0.01	New
Blank ballots	57,297	2.91	+2.36
Total	1,969,043		
Valid votes	1,969,043	99.24	−0.55
Invalid votes	15,023	0.76	+0.55
Votes cast / turnout	1,984,066	36.94	−2.86
Abstentions	3,386,540	63.06	+2.86
Registered voters	5,370,606		

=== Extremadura ===
← Summary of the 7 June 2009 European Parliament election results in Extremadura →
Parties and alliances	Popular vote		
Parties and alliances	Votes	%	±pp
Spanish Socialist Workers' Party (PSOE)	219,531	48.59	−3.65
People's Party (PP)	199,374	44.13	+0.88
United Left: The Left (IU)	11,498	2.54	−0.01
Union, Progress and Democracy (UPyD)	8,382	1.86	New
United Extremadura (EU)	1,720	0.38	−0.01
The Greens–European Green Group (LV–GVE)	1,182	0.26	+0.01
The Greens (Europe of the Peoples–Greens) (LV)	835	0.18	New
For a Fairer World (PUM+J)	627	0.14	+0.10
Anti-Bullfighting Party Against Mistreatment of Animals (PACMA)	563	0.12	New
Libertas–Citizens of Spain (Libertas)	415	0.09	New
Communist Party of the Peoples of Spain (PCPE)	367	0.08	+0.06
Internationalist Socialist Workers' Party (POSI)	313	0.07	+0.03
Democratic and Social Centre (CDS)	228	0.05	−0.02
Spanish Phalanx of the CNSO (FE de las JONS)	225	0.05	+0.03
Internationalist Initiative–Solidarity among Peoples (II–SP)	218	0.05	New
Spanish Alternative (AES)	169	0.04	New
National Democracy (DN)	165	0.04	+0.02
Anti-capitalist Left–Global Revolt (IzAn–RG)	160	0.04	New
Family and Life Party (PFyV)	144	0.03	±0.00
Feminist Initiative (IFem)	141	0.03	New
Humanist Party (PH)	133	0.03	+0.02
Authentic Phalanx (FA)	111	0.02	+0.01
Socialist Party of Andalusia (PSA)	102	0.02	New
Liberal Democratic Centre (CDL)	90	0.02	New
Coalition for Europe (CEU)^{1}	86	0.02	±0.00
Republican Social Movement (MSR)	86	0.02	New
National Front (FrN)	78	0.02	New
Catalan Republican Party (RC)	72	0.02	New
Internationalist Solidarity and Self-Management (SAIn)	60	0.01	New
Communist Unification of Spain (UCE)	56	0.01	New
Regionalist Party of the Leonese Country (PREPAL)	45	0.01	±0.00
Valencian Union (UV)	42	0.01	New
Liberal Centrist Union (UCL)	38	0.01	±0.00
Asturian Nationalist Unity (UNA)	37	0.01	New
Andecha Astur (AA)	29	0.01	New
Blank ballots	4,486	0.99	+0.50
Total	451,808		
Valid votes	451,808	99.29	−0.32
Invalid votes	3,214	0.71	+0.32
Votes cast / turnout	455,022	50.57	+1.07
Abstentions	444,748	49.43	−1.07
Registered voters	899,770		
Sources
Footnotes: ^{1} Coalition for Europe results are compared to Galeusca–Peoples of Europe totals in the 2004 election.

=== Galicia ===
← Summary of the 7 June 2009 European Parliament election results in Galicia →
Parties and alliances	Popular vote		
Parties and alliances	Votes	%	±pp
People's Party (PP)	571,320	50.01	+2.29
Socialists' Party of Galicia (PSdeG–PSOE)	403,141	35.29	−0.91
Galician Nationalist Bloc (Europe of the Peoples–Greens) (BNG)	103,724	9.08	−3.24
United Left: The Left (EU–IU)	14,956	1.31	−0.22
Union, Progress and Democracy (UPyD)	14,148	1.24	New
The Greens–European Green Group (LV–GVE)	4,780	0.42	+0.19
Internationalist Initiative–Solidarity among Peoples (II–SP)	3,460	0.30	New
Anti-Bullfighting Party Against Mistreatment of Animals (PACMA)	2,580	0.23	New
For a Fairer World (PUM+J)	1,613	0.14	+0.08
Anti-capitalist Left–Global Revolt (IzAn–RG)	1,072	0.09	New
Internationalist Socialist Workers' Party (POSI)	886	0.08	+0.01
Libertas–Citizens of Spain (Libertas)	862	0.08	New
Humanist Party (PH)	654	0.06	+0.02
Communist Party of the Peoples of Spain (PCPE)	616	0.05	+0.03
Spanish Phalanx of the CNSO (FE de las JONS)	559	0.05	+0.03
Feminist Initiative (IFem)	545	0.05	New
Republican Social Movement (MSR)	502	0.04	New
Democratic and Social Centre (CDS)	494	0.04	−0.06
Family and Life Party (PFyV)	396	0.03	±0.00
National Democracy (DN)	363	0.03	±0.00
Internationalist Solidarity and Self-Management (SAIn)	342	0.03	New
Socialist Party of Andalusia (PSA)	337	0.03	New
Spanish Alternative (AES)	325	0.03	New
National Front (FrN)	301	0.03	New
Coalition for Europe (CEU)	294	0.03	New
Authentic Phalanx (FA)	241	0.02	+0.01
Liberal Democratic Centre (CDL)	232	0.02	New
Communist Unification of Spain (UCE)	217	0.02	New
Regionalist Party of the Leonese Country (PREPAL)	143	0.01	±0.00
Asturian Nationalist Unity (UNA)	132	0.01	New
Catalan Republican Party (RC)	131	0.01	New
Liberal Centrist Union (UCL)	124	0.01	±0.00
Andecha Astur (AA)	114	0.01	New
United Extremadura (EU)	107	0.01	New
Valencian Union (UV)	95	0.01	New
Blank ballots	12,591	1.10	+0.43
Total	1,142,397		
Valid votes	1,142,397	99.34	−0.27
Invalid votes	7,576	0.66	+0.27
Votes cast / turnout	1,149,973	43.34	−0.96
Abstentions	1,503,436	56.66	+0.96
Registered voters	2,653,409		

=== La Rioja ===
← Summary of the 7 June 2009 European Parliament election results in La Rioja →
Parties and alliances	Popular vote		
Parties and alliances	Votes	%	±pp
People's Party (PP)	61,098	50.67	−0.60
Spanish Socialist Workers' Party (PSOE)	48,898	40.56	−3.29
Union, Progress and Democracy (UPyD)	3,593	2.98	New
United Left: The Left (IU)	2,251	1.87	−0.20
The Greens–European Green Group (LV–GVE)	560	0.46	−0.05
The Greens (Europe of the Peoples–Greens) (LV)	399	0.33	New
Internationalist Initiative–Solidarity among Peoples (II–SP)	228	0.19	New
Anti-Bullfighting Party Against Mistreatment of Animals (PACMA)	225	0.19	New
Internationalist Socialist Workers' Party (POSI)	182	0.15	+0.11
For a Fairer World (PUM+J)	163	0.14	+0.06
Communist Party of the Peoples of Spain (PCPE)	152	0.13	+0.11
Spanish Alternative (AES)	130	0.11	New
Coalition for Europe (CEU)^{1}	126	0.10	−0.06
Libertas–Citizens of Spain (Libertas)	104	0.09	New
Democratic and Social Centre (CDS)	99	0.08	+0.03
National Democracy (DN)	84	0.07	+0.02
Family and Life Party (PFyV)	73	0.06	±0.00
Spanish Phalanx of the CNSO (FE de las JONS)	71	0.06	+0.04
Feminist Initiative (IFem)	54	0.04	New
National Front (FrN)	44	0.04	New
Anti-capitalist Left–Global Revolt (IzAn–RG)	44	0.04	New
Authentic Phalanx (FA)	40	0.03	+0.02
Humanist Party (PH)	39	0.03	+0.01
Republican Social Movement (MSR)	34	0.03	New
Liberal Democratic Centre (CDL)	24	0.02	New
Regionalist Party of the Leonese Country (PREPAL)	22	0.02	+0.01
United Extremadura (EU)	20	0.02	New
Catalan Republican Party (RC)	18	0.01	New
Communist Unification of Spain (UCE)	17	0.01	New
Internationalist Solidarity and Self-Management (SAIn)	15	0.01	New
Socialist Party of Andalusia (PSA)	14	0.01	New
Andecha Astur (AA)	11	0.01	New
Liberal Centrist Union (UCL)	10	0.01	+0.01
Asturian Nationalist Unity (UNA)	10	0.01	New
Valencian Union (UV)	6	0.00	New
Blank ballots	1,711	1.42	+0.68
Total	120,569		
Valid votes	120,569	99.25	−0.40
Invalid votes	906	0.75	+0.40
Votes cast / turnout	121,475	50.37	−3.52
Abstentions	119,696	49.63	+3.52
Registered voters	241,171		
Sources
Footnotes: ^{1} Coalition for Europe results are compared to Galeusca–Peoples of Europe totals in the 2004 election.

=== Madrid ===
← Summary of the 7 June 2009 European Parliament election results in Madrid →
Parties and alliances	Popular vote		
Parties and alliances	Votes	%	±pp
People's Party (PP)	1,112,670	48.58	−0.96
Spanish Socialist Workers' Party (PSOE)	815,699	35.61	−7.25
Union, Progress and Democracy (UPyD)	156,839	6.85	New
United Left of the Community of Madrid: The Left (IUCM)	103,987	4.54	−0.59
The Greens–European Green Group (LV–GVE)	12,065	0.53	−0.03
Spanish Alternative (AES)	9,593	0.42	New
The Greens (Europe of the Peoples–Greens) (LV)	7,391	0.32	New
Anti-Bullfighting Party Against Mistreatment of Animals (PACMA)	5,568	0.24	New
For a Fairer World (PUM+J)	5,461	0.24	+0.17
Anti-capitalist Left–Global Revolt (IzAn–RG)	4,322	0.19	New
Internationalist Initiative–Solidarity among Peoples (II–SP)	4,031	0.18	New
Libertas–Citizens of Spain (Libertas)	3,929	0.17	New
National Front (FrN)	2,298	0.10	New
National Democracy (DN)	2,272	0.10	+0.02
Democratic and Social Centre (CDS)	2,025	0.09	±0.00
Communist Party of the Peoples of Spain (PCPE)	1,766	0.08	+0.06
Spanish Phalanx of the CNSO (FE de las JONS)	1,683	0.07	+0.04
Feminist Initiative (IFem)	1,493	0.07	New
Family and Life Party (PFyV)	1,426	0.06	±0.00
Internationalist Socialist Workers' Party (POSI)	1,180	0.05	+0.03
Coalition for Europe (CEU)^{1}	1,147	0.05	−0.05
Republican Social Movement (MSR)	1,041	0.05	New
Humanist Party (PH)	972	0.04	+0.01
United Extremadura (EU)	866	0.04	New
Authentic Phalanx (FA)	829	0.04	+0.03
Liberal Democratic Centre (CDL)	647	0.03	New
Internationalist Solidarity and Self-Management (SAIn)	477	0.02	New
Regionalist Party of the Leonese Country (PREPAL)	463	0.02	+0.01
Communist Unification of Spain (UCE)	416	0.02	New
Socialist Party of Andalusia (PSA)	363	0.02	New
Catalan Republican Party (RC)	267	0.01	New
Liberal Centrist Union (UCL)	263	0.01	±0.00
Asturian Nationalist Unity (UNA)	225	0.01	New
Andecha Astur (AA)	155	0.01	New
Valencian Union (UV)	123	0.01	New
Blank ballots	26,477	1.16	+0.45
Total	2,290,429		
Valid votes	2,290,429	99.55	−0.26
Invalid votes	10,434	0.45	+0.26
Votes cast / turnout	2,300,863	50.41	+1.16
Abstentions	2,263,771	49.59	−1.16
Registered voters	4,564,634		
Sources
Footnotes: ^{1} Coalition for Europe results are compared to Galeusca–Peoples of Europe totals in the 2004 election.

=== Murcia ===
← Summary of the 7 June 2009 European Parliament election results in Murcia →
Parties and alliances	Popular vote		
Parties and alliances	Votes	%	±pp
People's Party (PP)	288,460	61.51	+2.57
Spanish Socialist Workers' Party (PSOE)	139,897	29.83	−6.53
United Left of the Region of Murcia: The Left (IURM)	14,024	2.99	+0.14
Union, Progress and Democracy (UPyD)	13,447	2.87	New
The Greens–European Green Group (LV–GVE)	1,870	0.40	−0.06
The Greens (Europe of the Peoples–Greens) (LV)	1,197	0.26	New
Anti-Bullfighting Party Against Mistreatment of Animals (PACMA)	680	0.15	New
Spanish Alternative (AES)	532	0.11	New
For a Fairer World (PUM+J)	515	0.11	+0.07
Libertas–Citizens of Spain (Libertas)	502	0.11	New
Liberal Democratic Centre (CDL)	397	0.08	New
Communist Party of the Peoples of Spain (PCPE)	304	0.06	+0.05
National Democracy (DN)	291	0.06	+0.04
Spanish Phalanx of the CNSO (FE de las JONS)	285	0.06	+0.03
Democratic and Social Centre (CDS)	274	0.06	−0.02
Family and Life Party (PFyV)	257	0.05	+0.01
Feminist Initiative (IFem)	255	0.05	New
Anti-capitalist Left–Global Revolt (IzAn–RG)	217	0.05	New
Internationalist Initiative–Solidarity among Peoples (II–SP)	168	0.04	New
Authentic Phalanx (FA)	165	0.04	+0.02
Humanist Party (PH)	154	0.03	+0.01
Internationalist Socialist Workers' Party (POSI)	139	0.03	±0.00
National Front (FrN)	102	0.02	New
Internationalist Solidarity and Self-Management (SAIn)	102	0.02	New
Communist Unification of Spain (UCE)	100	0.02	New
Socialist Party of Andalusia (PSA)	98	0.02	New
Regionalist Party of the Leonese Country (PREPAL)	92	0.02	+0.01
Coalition for Europe (CEU)^{1}	84	0.02	±0.00
Republican Social Movement (MSR)	81	0.02	New
Liberal Centrist Union (UCL)	63	0.01	+0.01
Catalan Republican Party (RC)	58	0.01	New
Valencian Union (UV)	38	0.01	New
Asturian Nationalist Unity (UNA)	36	0.01	New
United Extremadura (EU)	30	0.01	New
Andecha Astur (AA)	29	0.01	New
Blank ballots	4,008	0.85	+0.34
Total	468,951		
Valid votes	468,951	99.30	−0.45
Invalid votes	3,310	0.70	+0.45
Votes cast / turnout	472,261	47.96	−1.10
Abstentions	512,518	52.04	+1.10
Registered voters	984,779		
Sources
Footnotes: ^{1} Coalition for Europe results are compared to Galeusca–Peoples of Europe totals in the 2004 election.

=== Navarre ===
← Summary of the 7 June 2009 European Parliament election results in Navarre →
Parties and alliances	Popular vote		
Parties and alliances	Votes	%	±pp
People's Party (PP)	76,629	37.79	−7.40
Spanish Socialist Workers' Party (PSOE)	63,848	31.48	−3.46
Internationalist Initiative–Solidarity among Peoples (II–SP)	23,154	11.42	New
Independentists and Leftists (Europe of the Peoples–Greens) (Aralar–EA)^{1}	14,060	6.93	−2.34
United Left of Navarre: The Left (IUN/NEB)	6,775	3.34	−0.93
Union, Progress and Democracy (UPyD)	4,302	2.12	New
Basque Nationalist Party (Coalition for Europe) (EAJ/PNV)	3,691	1.82	−0.28
The Greens–European Green Group (B–ETB/LV–GVE)	1,954	0.96	+0.33
For a Fairer World (PUM+J)	712	0.35	+0.21
Anti-Bullfighting Party Against Mistreatment of Animals (PACMA)	477	0.24	New
Internationalist Solidarity and Self-Management (SAIn)	455	0.22	New
Anti-capitalist Left–Global Revolt (IzAn–RG)	403	0.20	New
Family and Life Party (PFyV)	346	0.17	+0.07
Spanish Alternative (AES)	330	0.16	New
Libertas–Citizens of Spain (Libertas)	320	0.16	New
Republican Social Movement (MSR)	300	0.15	New
Internationalist Socialist Workers' Party (POSI)	242	0.12	+0.03
Democratic and Social Centre (CDS)	220	0.11	−0.03
Communist Party of the Peoples of Spain–Basque Communists (PCPE–EK)	211	0.10	+0.03
Feminist Initiative (IFem)	199	0.10	New
National Front (FrN)	134	0.07	New
Spanish Phalanx of the CNSO (FE de las JONS)	122	0.06	+0.04
National Democracy (DN)	113	0.06	+0.01
Asturian Nationalist Unity (UNA)	96	0.05	New
Humanist Party (PH)	92	0.05	−0.01
Socialist Party of Andalusia (PSA)	70	0.03	New
Regionalist Party of the Leonese Country (PREPAL)	61	0.03	+0.01
Catalan Republican Party (RC)	61	0.03	New
Communist Unification of Spain (UCE)	55	0.03	New
United Extremadura (EU)	49	0.02	New
Liberal Democratic Centre (CDL)	48	0.02	New
Authentic Phalanx (FA)	39	0.02	+0.01
Valencian Union (UV)	35	0.02	New
Andecha Astur (AA)	28	0.01	New
Liberal Centrist Union (UCL)	26	0.01	±0.00
Blank ballots	3,141	1.55	+0.69
Total	202,798		
Valid votes	202,798	99.24	+6.52
Invalid votes	1,547	0.76	−6.52
Votes cast / turnout	204,345	42.69	−3.47
Abstentions	274,355	57.31	+3.47
Registered voters	478,700		
Sources
Footnotes: ^{1} Independentists and Leftists–Europe of the Peoples–Greens results are compared to the combined totals of Basque Solidarity and Aralar in the 2004 election.

=== Valencian Community ===
← Summary of the 7 June 2009 European Parliament election results in the Valencian Community →
Parties and alliances	Popular vote		
Parties and alliances	Votes	%	±pp
People's Party (PP)	984,005	52.23	+2.51
Spanish Socialist Workers' Party (PSOE)	708,244	37.59	−4.62
United Left of the Valencian Country: The Left (EUPV)	52,742	2.80	−0.53
Union, Progress and Democracy (UPyD)	40,344	2.14	New
Valencian Nationalist Bloc (Coalition for Europe) (Bloc)	18,458	0.98	−0.14
The Greens–European Green Group (EV–GVE)	13,441	0.71	+0.17
Republican Left of the Valencian Country–The Greens (EdP–V) (ERPV–EV)	9,807	0.52	−0.38
Anti-Bullfighting Party Against Mistreatment of Animals (PACMA)	4,407	0.23	New
Valencian Union (UV)	4,398	0.23	−0.26
Internationalist Initiative–Solidarity among Peoples (II–SP)	3,607	0.19	New
Libertas–Citizens of Spain (Libertas)	2,304	0.12	New
For a Fairer World (PUM+J)	2,043	0.11	+0.06
Anti-capitalist Left–Global Revolt (IzAn–RG)	1,870	0.10	New
Communist Party of the Peoples of Spain (PCPE)	1,837	0.10	+0.07
Spanish Alternative (AES)	1,520	0.08	New
Liberal Democratic Centre (CDL)	1,410	0.07	New
Democratic and Social Centre (CDS)	1,324	0.07	+0.01
Spanish Phalanx of the CNSO (FE de las JONS)	1,233	0.07	+0.04
Family and Life Party (PFyV)	1,206	0.06	±0.00
Internationalist Socialist Workers' Party (POSI)	1,139	0.06	+0.02
National Democracy (DN)	1,030	0.05	−0.01
Feminist Initiative (IFem)	1,026	0.05	New
Humanist Party (PH)	909	0.05	+0.02
National Front (FrN)	810	0.04	New
Authentic Phalanx (FA)	794	0.04	+0.02
Communist Unification of Spain (UCE)	714	0.04	New
Republican Social Movement (MSR)	681	0.04	New
Catalan Republican Party (RC)	571	0.03	New
Socialist Party of Andalusia (PSA)	329	0.02	New
Liberal Centrist Union (UCL)	298	0.02	+0.01
Internationalist Solidarity and Self-Management (SAIn)	253	0.01	New
United Extremadura (EU)	220	0.01	New
Asturian Nationalist Unity (UNA)	218	0.01	New
Regionalist Party of the Leonese Country (PREPAL)	196	0.01	±0.00
Andecha Astur (AA)	170	0.01	New
Blank ballots	20,431	1.08	+0.54
Total	1,883,989		
Valid votes	1,883,989	99.34	−0.35
Invalid votes	12,461	0.66	+0.35
Votes cast / turnout	1,896,450	52.80	+2.34
Abstentions	1,695,454	47.20	−2.34
Registered voters	3,591,904		

== Autonomous cities ==
=== Ceuta ===
← Summary of the 7 June 2009 European Parliament election results in Ceuta →
Parties and alliances	Popular vote		
Parties and alliances	Votes	%	±pp
People's Party (PP)	10,952	59.52	+1.40
Spanish Socialist Workers' Party (PSOE)	6,014	32.68	−6.54
Union, Progress and Democracy (UPyD)	668	3.63	New
The Greens–European Green Group (LV–GVE)	96	0.52	+0.32
United Left: The Left (IU)	92	0.50	−0.12
The Greens (Europe of the Peoples–Greens) (LV)	48	0.26	New
Anti-Bullfighting Party Against Mistreatment of Animals (PACMA)	40	0.22	New
Communist Party of the Peoples of Spain (PCPE)	40	0.22	+0.16
Socialist Party of Andalusia (PSA)	33	0.18	New
Spanish Alternative (AES)	28	0.15	New
Libertas–Citizens of Spain (Libertas)	25	0.14	New
For a Fairer World (PUM+J)	21	0.11	+0.07
Internationalist Socialist Workers' Party (POSI)	20	0.11	+0.07
Family and Life Party (PFyV)	15	0.08	+0.06
Internationalist Initiative–Solidarity among Peoples (II–SP)	15	0.08	New
Authentic Phalanx (FA)	12	0.07	+0.05
Coalition for Europe (CEU)^{1}	12	0.07	+0.02
Spanish Phalanx of the CNSO (FE de las JONS)	10	0.05	−0.05
National Democracy (DN)	9	0.05	+0.01
National Front (FrN)	8	0.04	New
Liberal Democratic Centre (CDL)	7	0.04	New
Feminist Initiative (IFem)	7	0.04	New
Humanist Party (PH)	6	0.03	+0.02
Communist Unification of Spain (UCE)	6	0.03	New
Anti-capitalist Left–Global Revolt (IzAn–RG)	5	0.03	New
Liberal Centrist Union (UCL)	5	0.03	+0.02
Democratic and Social Centre (CDS)	4	0.02	−0.04
Republican Social Movement (MSR)	3	0.02	New
Valencian Union (UV)	3	0.02	New
Andecha Astur (AA)	3	0.02	New
Internationalist Solidarity and Self-Management (SAIn)	2	0.01	New
Regionalist Party of the Leonese Country (PREPAL)	2	0.01	±0.00
Catalan Republican Party (RC)	1	0.01	New
Asturian Nationalist Unity (UNA)	1	0.01	New
United Extremadura (EU)	0	0.00	New
Blank ballots	187	1.02	+0.38
Total	18,400		
Valid votes	18,400	99.43	−0.06
Invalid votes	105	0.57	+0.06
Votes cast / turnout	18,505	31.65	−0.02
Abstentions	39,967	68.35	+0.02
Registered voters	58,472		
Sources
Footnotes: ^{1} Coalition for Europe results are compared to Galeusca–Peoples of Europe totals in the 2004 election.

=== Melilla ===
← Summary of the 7 June 2009 European Parliament election results in Melilla →
Parties and alliances	Popular vote		
Parties and alliances	Votes	%	±pp
People's Party (PP)	9,501	56.07	+3.63
Spanish Socialist Workers' Party (PSOE)	6,351	37.48	−7.07
Union, Progress and Democracy (UPyD)	556	3.28	New
United Left: The Left (IU)	88	0.52	−0.48
The Greens (Europe of the Peoples–Greens) (LV)	26	0.15	New
The Greens–European Green Group (LV–GVE)	26	0.15	−0.03
Anti-Bullfighting Party Against Mistreatment of Animals (PACMA)	20	0.12	New
Internationalist Socialist Workers' Party (POSI)	19	0.11	+0.06
Spanish Alternative (AES)	16	0.09	New
Libertas–Citizens of Spain (Libertas)	15	0.09	New
Socialist Party of Andalusia (PSA)	15	0.09	New
Communist Party of the Peoples of Spain (PCPE)	14	0.08	+0.05
Anti-capitalist Left–Global Revolt (IzAn–RG)	12	0.07	New
Spanish Phalanx of the CNSO (FE de las JONS)	10	0.06	+0.05
For a Fairer World (PUM+J)	10	0.06	+0.04
Catalan Republican Party (RC)	9	0.05	New
National Democracy (DN)	9	0.05	+0.02
Authentic Phalanx (FA)	8	0.05	+0.02
Communist Unification of Spain (UCE)	8	0.05	New
Humanist Party (PH)	7	0.04	+0.04
Democratic and Social Centre (CDS)	7	0.04	−0.14
Feminist Initiative (IFem)	6	0.04	New
Coalition for Europe (CEU)^{1}	6	0.04	−0.01
Internationalist Initiative–Solidarity among Peoples (II–SP)	6	0.04	New
Family and Life Party (PFyV)	5	0.03	±0.00
National Front (FrN)	5	0.03	New
Andecha Astur (AA)	4	0.02	New
United Extremadura (EU)	3	0.02	New
Liberal Centrist Union (UCL)	3	0.02	+0.01
Republican Social Movement (MSR)	2	0.01	New
Asturian Nationalist Unity (UNA)	2	0.01	New
Liberal Democratic Centre (CDL)	1	0.01	New
Internationalist Solidarity and Self-Management (SAIn)	1	0.01	New
Valencian Union (UV)	0	0.00	New
Regionalist Party of the Leonese Country (PREPAL)	0	0.00	−0.01
Blank ballots	175	1.03	+0.51
Total	16,946		
Valid votes	16,946	99.31	−0.37
Invalid votes	118	0.69	+0.37
Votes cast / turnout	17,064	33.03	+1.75
Abstentions	34,596	66.97	−1.75
Registered voters	51,660		
Sources
Footnotes: ^{1} Coalition for Europe results are compared to Galeusca–Peoples of Europe totals in the 2004 election.

== Congress of Deputies projection ==
A projection of European Parliament election results using electoral rules for the Congress of Deputies would have given the following seat allocation, as distributed per constituencies and regions: (Note: Note that results are compared with party totals in the preceding general election—held in March 2008—for consistency.)

Summary of the 7 June 2009 Congress of Deputies projected election results
Parties and alliances	Popular vote			Seats	
Parties and alliances	Votes	%	±pp	Total	+/−
People's Party (PP)	6,670,377	42.12	+2.18	169	+15
Spanish Socialist Workers' Party (PSOE)	6,141,784	38.78	−5.09	149	−20
United Left–Initiative for Catalonia Greens: The Left (IU–ICV)	588,248	3.71	−0.06	3	+1
Union, Progress and Democracy (UPyD)	451,866	2.85	+1.66	2	+1
Convergence and Union (CiU)	441,810	2.79	−0.24	13	+3
Basque Nationalist Party (EAJ/PNV)	212,123	1.34	+0.35	6	±0
Republican Left of Catalonia (esquerra)	198,671	1.25	+0.09	4	+1
Internationalist Initiative–Solidarity among Peoples (II–SP)	139,981	0.88	New	2	+2
Galician Nationalist Bloc (BNG)	103,724	0.65	−0.18	0	−2
Canarian Coalition (CC)	96,297	0.61	−0.07	2	±0
Navarre Yes (NaBai)	n/a	n/a	−0.24	0	−1
Others	570,415	3.60	—	0	±0
Blank ballots	220,471	1.39	+0.28		
Total	15,835,767			350	±0

=== Constituencies ===

Summary of constituency results in the 7 June 2009 European Parliament election in Spain
Constituency	PP		PSOE		IU–ICV		UPyD		CiU		PNV		esquerra		II–SP		CC	
Constituency	%	S	%	S	%	S	%	S	%	S	%	S	%	S	%	S	%	S
A Coruña	48.5	5	35.7	3	1.5	−	1.6	−										
Álava	25.8	1	31.4	2	1.9	−	2.4	−			19.6	1			10.9	−		
Albacete	49.4	2	41.4	2	3.3	−	2.6	−										
Alicante	52.8	7	37.6	5	2.5	−	2.4	−					0.4	−				
Almería	51.2	3	40.6	3	2.7	−	1.7	−										
Asturias	42.0	4	44.1	4	5.6	−	4.1	−										
Ávila	60.0	2	30.9	1	2.5	−	3.4	−										
Badajoz	44.2	3	48.5	3	2.7	−	2.0	−										
Balearic Islands	43.7	4	38.7	4	2.6	−	2.8	−					3.0	−				
Barcelona	18.5	6	37.4	13	6.7	2	0.9	−	20.8	7			8.3	3				
Biscay	15.9	1	27.8	3	1.9	−	1.5	−			32.9	3			13.0	1		
Burgos	51.8	2	35.9	2	2.6	−	4.6	−										
Cáceres	44.1	2	48.8	2	2.3	−	1.6	−										
Cádiz	39.8	4	46.7	5	4.8	−	2.9	−										
Cantabria	50.7	3	39.9	2	2.0	−	3.2	−										
Castellón	50.7	3	39.5	2	2.0	−	1.6	−					0.7	−				
Ceuta	59.5	1	32.7	−	0.5	−	3.6	−										
Ciudad Real	50.3	3	42.0	2	2.8	−	2.2	−										
Córdoba	39.4	3	47.4	3	6.8	−	1.9	−										
Cuenca	52.2	2	41.2	1	2.3	−	1.6	−										
Gipuzkoa	12.0	1	26.2	2	1.7	−	1.2	−			24.5	2			23.7	1		
Girona	13.3	1	29.7	2	4.7	−	0.4	−	30.0	2			13.4	1				
Granada	41.9	3	47.1	4	4.9	−	2.6	−										
Guadalajara	51.4	2	36.3	1	3.5	−	4.8	−										
Huelva	35.5	2	54.0	3	4.2	−	1.9	−										
Huesca	41.6	1	44.7	2	3.0	−	3.0	−										
Jaén	39.0	3	51.2	3	4.9	−	1.4	−										
La Rioja	50.7	2	40.6	2	1.9	−	3.0	−										
Las Palmas	45.6	4	38.6	4	1.4	−	1.3	−									8.3	−
León	46.2	3	45.0	2	2.0	−	2.9	−										
Lleida	17.1	1	28.1	1	3.6	−	0.4	−	31.0	2			12.1	−				
Lugo	52.8	3	34.4	1	0.9	−	0.8	−										
Madrid	48.6	19	35.6	13	4.5	1	6.8	2										
Málaga	43.5	5	43.7	5	5.5	−	3.0	−										
Melilla	56.1	1	37.5	−	0.5	−	3.3	−										
Murcia	61.5	7	29.8	3	3.0	−	2.9	−										
Navarre	37.8	3	31.5	2	3.3	−	2.1	−			1.8	−			11.4	−		
Ourense	54.1	3	34.1	1	0.8	−	0.7	−										
Palencia	51.8	2	39.3	1	2.4	−	2.7	−										
Pontevedra	48.8	4	35.6	3	1.5	−	1.2	−										
Salamanca	55.2	3	35.6	1	1.7	−	3.3	−										
Santa Cruz de Tenerife	36.0	3	33.4	2	1.8	−	1.1	−									23.4	2
Segovia	54.5	2	34.4	1	2.8	−	3.9	−										
Seville	33.6	5	52.6	7	5.7	−	3.2	−										
Soria	53.4	1	37.4	1	2.0	−	2.8	−										
Tarragona	19.2	1	34.9	3	3.8	−	0.7	−	23.6	2			10.7	−				
Teruel	45.5	2	43.4	1	3.3	−	1.5	−										
Toledo	53.3	4	38.3	2	3.1	−	2.5	−										
Valencia	52.2	9	37.2	7	3.2	−	2.1	−					0.6	−				
Valladolid	49.4	3	38.6	2	2.9	−	5.1	−										
Zamora	54.1	2	38.6	1	1.8	−	1.9	−										
Zaragoza	41.1	3	43.9	4	3.7	−	3.5	−										
Total	42.1	169	38.8	149	3.7	3	2.9	2	2.8	13	1.3	6	1.3	4	0.9	2	0.6	2

=== Regions ===

Summary of regional results in the 7 June 2009 European Parliament election in Spain
Region	PP		PSOE		IU–ICV		UPyD		CiU		PNV		esquerra		II–SP		CC	
Region	%	S	%	S	%	S	%	S	%	S	%	S	%	S	%	S	%	S
Andalusia	39.7	28	48.2	33	5.2	−	2.5	−										
Aragon	41.7	6	44.0	7	3.5	−	3.2	−										
Asturias	42.0	4	44.1	4	5.6	−	4.1	−										
Balearic Islands	43.7	4	38.7	4	2.6	−	2.8	−					3.0	−				
Basque Country	16.0	3	27.8	7	1.8	−	1.5	−			28.5	6			16.0	2		
Canary Islands	40.8	7	36.0	6	1.6	−	1.2	−									15.8	2
Cantabria	50.7	3	39.9	2	2.0	−	3.2	−										
Castile and León	51.7	20	38.2	12	2.3	−	3.7	−										
Castilla–La Mancha	51.5	13	39.9	8	3.0	−	2.6	−										
Catalonia	18.0	9	36.0	19	6.1	2	0.8	−	22.4	13			9.2	4				
Ceuta	59.5	1	32.7	−	0.5	−	3.6	−										
Extremadura	44.1	5	48.6	5	2.5	−	1.9	−										
Galicia	50.0	15	35.3	8	1.3	−	1.2	−										
La Rioja	50.7	2	40.6	2	1.9	−	3.0	−										
Madrid	48.6	19	35.6	13	4.5	1	6.8	2										
Melilla	56.1	1	37.5	−	0.5	−	3.3	−										
Murcia	61.5	7	29.8	3	3.0	−	2.9	−										
Navarre	37.8	3	31.5	2	3.3	−	2.1	−			1.8	−			11.4	−		
Valencian Community	52.2	19	37.6	14	2.8	–	2.1	–					0.5	–				
Total	42.1	169	38.8	149	3.7	3	2.9	2	2.8	13	1.3	6	1.3	4	0.9	2	0.6	2
