= Left Party =

There are several socialist political parties with the name Left Party:

- Estonian Left Party, in Estonian: Eesti Vasakpartei, 1990–2008
- Estonian United Left Party in Estonian: Eestimaa Ühendatud Vasakpartei, formed in 2008
- Left Party (France), in French: Parti de gauche
- Left Party (Sweden), in Swedish: Vänsterpartiet
- Left Party (Turkey), in Turkish: SOL Parti
- Left Party – Zona Franca, San Marino, in Italian: Partito della Sinistra – Zona Franca
- Party of the European Left, a party at the European level
- Socialist Left Party (Norway), in Norwegian: Sosialistisk Venstreparti (SV)
- Die Linke, also known as the Left Party
- The Left Party.PDS, in German: Die Linkspartei.PDS

== See also ==
- Left Alliance (disambiguation)
- The Left (disambiguation)
- Lewica (disambiguation)
