= Huelva (Congress of Deputies constituency) =

Electoral constituency in Spain

Coordinates: 37°40′N 7°00′W

- Congress of Deputies; Electoral constituency
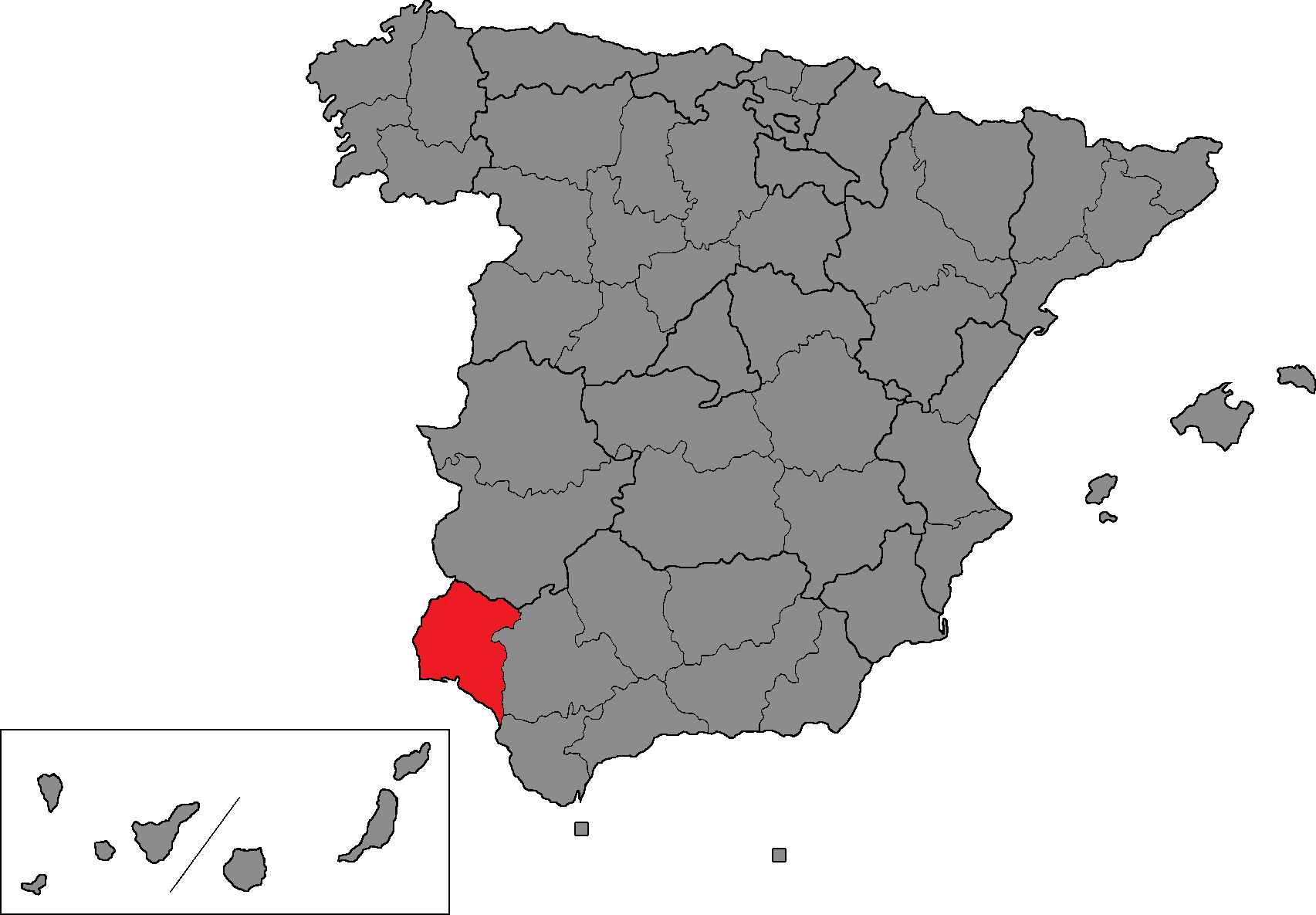
- Location of Huelva within Spain
- Province: Huelva
- Autonomous community: Andalusia
- Population: ▲533,448 (2024)
- Electorate: ▲402,504 (2023)
- Major settlements: Huelva

Current constituency
- Created: 1977
- Seats: 5
- Members: PP (2); PSOE (2); Vox (1)

Huelva is one of the 52 constituencies represented in the Congress of Deputies, the lower chamber of the Spanish parliament, the Cortes Generales. The constituency (whose boundaries correspond to those of the homonymous province) currently elects five deputies. The electoral system uses the D'Hondt method and closed-list proportional voting, with a minimum threshold of three percent.

== Electoral system ==
The constituency was created as per the Political Reform Law and was first contested in the 1977 general election. The Law provided for the provinces of Spain to be established as multi-member districts in the Congress of Deputies, with this regulation being maintained under the Spanish Constitution of 1978. Additionally, the Constitution requires for any modification of the provincial limits to be approved under an organic law, needing an absolute majority in the Cortes Generales.

Voting is based on universal suffrage, comprising all Spanish nationals over 18 years of age with full political rights, provided that they have not been deprived of the right to vote by a final sentence. The only exception was in 1977, when this was limited to nationals over 21 years of age and in full enjoyment of their political and civil rights. Amendments in 2011 required non-resident citizens to apply for voting, a system known as "begged" voting (Spanish: Voto rogado). which was abolished in 2022. Further, amendments in 2018 granted the right to vote to those legally incapacitated. The Congress of Deputies has a minimum of 300 and a maximum of 400 seats, with electoral provisions fixing its size at 350. Of these, 348 are elected in 50 multi-member constituencies corresponding to the provinces of Spain—each of which is assigned an initial minimum of two seats and the remaining 248 distributed in proportion to population—using the D'Hondt method and closed-list proportional voting, with a three percent-threshold of valid votes (including blank ballots) in each constituency. The remaining two seats are allocated to Ceuta and Melilla as single-member districts elected by plurality voting. The use of this electoral method may result in a higher effective threshold depending on district magnitude and vote distribution. The law does not provide for by-elections to fill vacant seats; instead, any vacancies arising after the proclamation of candidates and during the legislative term are filled by the next candidates on the party lists or, when required, by designated substitutes.

The electoral law allows for parties and federations registered in the interior ministry, alliances and groupings of electors to present lists of candidates. Parties and federations intending to form an alliance are required to inform the relevant electoral commission within 10 days of the election call—15 before 1985—whereas groupings of electors need to secure the signature of at least one percent of the electorate in the constituencies for which they seek election—one permille of the electorate, with a compulsory minimum of 500 signatures, until 1985—disallowing electors from signing for more than one list. Also since 2011, parties, federations or alliances that have not obtained a mandate in either chamber of the Cortes at the preceding election are required to secure the signature of at least 0.1 percent of electors in the aforementioned constituencies. Amendments in 2007 required a balanced composition of men and women in the electoral lists, so that candidates of either sex made up at least 40 percent of the total composition; further amendments in 2024 required the use of a zipper system.

== Deputies ==
Deputies 1977–present
Key to parties U.Podemos Podemos PSOE Cs UCD PP CP AP Vox
Legislature	Election	Distribution
Constituent	1977	2 / 3
1st	1979	2 / 3
2nd	1982	4 / 1
3rd	1986	4 / 1
4th	1989	4 / 1
5th	1993	3 / 2
6th	1996	3 / 2
7th	2000	3 / 2
8th	2004	3 / 2
9th	2008	3 / 2
10th	2011	2 / 3
11th	2015	1 / 2 / 2
12th	2016	1 / 2 / 2
13th	2019 (Apr)	1 / 2 / 1 / 1
14th	2019 (Nov)	3 / 1 / 1
15th	2023	2 / 2 / 1

== General elections ==
=== 2026 ===
Summary of the 29 November 2026 Congress of Deputies election results in Huelva
Parties and alliances	Popular vote			Seats	
Parties and alliances	Votes	%	±pp	Total	+/−
People's Party (PP)					
Spanish Socialist Workers' Party (PSOE)					
Vox (Vox)					
Andalusian Broad Front (FA)^{1}			n/a		
We Can (Podemos)^{1}			n/a		
Animalist Party with the Environment (PACMA)					
Workers' Front (FO)			New		
Forward Andalusia (Adelante Andalucía)			New		
Communist Party of the Workers of Spain (PCTE)			New		
The Party is Over (SALF)			New		
Blank ballots					
Total				5	±0
Valid votes					
Invalid votes					
Votes cast / turnout					
Abstentions					
Registered voters	408,911				
Sources
Footnotes: ^{1} Within the Unite Andalusia alliance in the 2023 election.

=== 2023 ===
Summary of the 23 July 2023 Congress of Deputies election results in Huelva
Parties and alliances	Popular vote			Seats	
Parties and alliances	Votes	%	±pp	Total	+/−
People's Party (PP)	93,565	36.43	+16.70	2	+1
Spanish Socialist Workers' Party (PSOE)	92,326	35.95	–0.61	2	–1
Vox (Vox)	37,572	14.63	–6.31	1	±0
Unite Andalusia (Sumar)^{1}	26,752	10.42	–1.70	0	±0
For Huelva (XH)	1,931	0.75	New	0	±0
Animalist Party with the Environment (PACMA)^{2}	1,663	0.65	–0.36	0	±0
For a Fairer World (PUM+J)	368	0.14	±0.00	0	±0
Zero Cuts (Recortes Cero)	217	0.08	–0.12	0	±0
Blank ballots	2,410	0.94	–0.39		
Total	256,804			5	±0
Valid votes	256,804	98.44	+0.26		
Invalid votes	4,057	1.56	–0.26		
Votes cast / turnout	260,861	64.81	+0.82		
Abstentions	141,643	35.19	–0.82		
Registered voters	402,504				
Sources
Footnotes: ^{1} Unite Andalusia results are compared to United We Can totals in the November 2019 election.; ^{2} Animalist Party with the Environment results are compared to Animalist Party Against Mistreatment of Animals totals in the November 2019 election.

=== November 2019 ===
Summary of the 10 November 2019 Congress of Deputies election results in Huelva
Parties and alliances	Popular vote			Seats	
Parties and alliances	Votes	%	±pp	Total	+/−
Spanish Socialist Workers' Party (PSOE)	91,656	36.56	–0.39	3	+1
Vox (Vox)	52,485	20.94	+8.12	1	+1
People's Party (PP)	49,452	19.73	+2.76	1	±0
United We Can (Podemos–IULV–CA)	30,389	12.12	–0.88	0	–1
Citizens–Party of the Citizenry (Cs)	18,382	7.33	–9.62	0	–1
Animalist Party Against Mistreatment of Animals (PACMA)	2,535	1.01	–0.19	0	±0
Andalusia by Herself (AxSí)	856	0.34	+0.02	0	±0
Zero Cuts–Green Group (Recortes Cero–GV)	495	0.20	–0.04	0	±0
Spanish Communist Workers' Party (PCOE)	464	0.19	–0.14	0	±0
For a Fairer World (PUM+J)	351	0.14	New	0	±0
Communist Party of the Andalusian People (PCPA)	159	0.06	–0.04	0	±0
Communist Party of the Workers of Spain (PCTE)	112	0.04	New	0	±0
Blank ballots	3,345	1.33	+0.23		
Total	250,681			5	±0
Valid votes	250,681	98.18	–0.17		
Invalid votes	4,648	1.82	+0.17		
Votes cast / turnout	255,329	63.99	–3.67		
Abstentions	143,690	36.01	+3.67		
Registered voters	399,019				

=== April 2019 ===
Summary of the 28 April 2019 Congress of Deputies election results in Huelva
Parties and alliances	Popular vote			Seats	
Parties and alliances	Votes	%	±pp	Total	+/−
Spanish Socialist Workers' Party (PSOE)	97,766	36.95	+1.11	2	±0
People's Party (PP)	44,909	16.97	–16.37	1	–1
Citizens–Party of the Citizenry (Cs)	44,842	16.95	+5.28	1	+1
United We Can (Podemos–IULV–CA–Equo)	34,396	13.00	–3.28	1	±0
Vox (Vox)	33,920	12.82	+12.66	0	±0
Animalist Party Against Mistreatment of Animals (PACMA)	3,182	1.20	+0.04	0	±0
Spanish Communist Workers' Party (PCOE)	871	0.33	New	0	±0
Andalusia by Herself (AxSí)	856	0.32	New	0	±0
Zero Cuts–Green Group (Recortes Cero–GV)	646	0.24	+0.05	0	±0
Communist Party of the Andalusian People (PCPA)	272	0.10	–0.04	0	±0
Blank ballots	2,909	1.10	+0.07		
Total	264,569			5	±0
Valid votes	264,569	98.35	–0.27		
Invalid votes	4,430	1.65	+0.27		
Votes cast / turnout	268,999	67.66	+4.73		
Abstentions	128,593	32.34	–4.73		
Registered voters	397,592				

=== 2016 ===
Summary of the 26 June 2016 Congress of Deputies election results in Huelva
Parties and alliances	Popular vote			Seats	
Parties and alliances	Votes	%	±pp	Total	+/−
Spanish Socialist Workers' Party (PSOE)	88,100	35.84	–1.07	2	±0
People's Party (PP)	81,959	33.34	+4.64	2	±0
United We Can for Andalusia (Podemos–IU–Equo)^{1}	40,023	16.28	–3.49	1	±0
Citizens–Party of the Citizenry (C's)	28,685	11.67	–0.21	0	±0
Animalist Party Against Mistreatment of Animals (PACMA)	2,850	1.16	+0.24	0	±0
Zero Cuts–Green Group (Recortes Cero–GV)	470	0.19	+0.06	0	±0
Union, Progress and Democracy (UPyD)	464	0.19	–0.20	0	±0
Vox (Vox)	398	0.16	–0.02	0	±0
Communist Party of the Peoples of Spain (PCPE)	344	0.14	+0.02	0	±0
Blank ballots	2,526	1.03	+0.10		
Total	245,819			5	±0
Valid votes	245,819	98.62	–0.21		
Invalid votes	3,450	1.38	+0.21		
Votes cast / turnout	249,269	62.93	–3.20		
Abstentions	146,848	37.07	+3.20		
Registered voters	396,117				
Sources
Footnotes: ^{1} United We Can results are compared to the combined totals of We Can and United Left/Greens–Assembly for Andalusia–Popular Unity in Common in the 2015 election.

=== 2015 ===
Summary of the 20 December 2015 Congress of Deputies election results in Huelva
Parties and alliances	Popular vote			Seats	
Parties and alliances	Votes	%	±pp	Total	+/−
Spanish Socialist Workers' Party (PSOE)	95,637	36.91	–3.63	2	±0
People's Party (PP)	74,353	28.70	–15.19	2	–1
We Can (Podemos)	39,435	15.22	New	1	+1
Citizens–Party of the Citizenry (C's)	30,776	11.88	New	0	±0
United Left/Greens–Assembly for Andalusia–Popular Unity (IULV–CA–UPeC)	11,786	4.55	–2.48	0	±0
Animalist Party Against Mistreatment of Animals (PACMA)	2,385	0.92	+0.61	0	±0
Union, Progress and Democracy (UPyD)	1,014	0.39	–3.04	0	±0
Vox (Vox)	460	0.18	New	0	±0
Zero Cuts–Green Group (Recortes Cero–GV)	336	0.13	New	0	±0
Communist Party of the Peoples of Spain (PCPE)	307	0.12	–0.05	0	±0
National Democracy (DN)	192	0.07	–0.04	0	±0
Blank ballots	2,409	0.93	–0.36		
Total	259,090			5	±0
Valid votes	259,090	98.83	+0.06		
Invalid votes	3,061	1.17	–0.06		
Votes cast / turnout	262,151	66.13	–1.80		
Abstentions	134,264	33.87	+1.80		
Registered voters	396,415				

=== 2011 ===
Summary of the 20 November 2011 Congress of Deputies election results in Huelva
Parties and alliances	Popular vote			Seats	
Parties and alliances	Votes	%	±pp	Total	+/−
People's Party (PP)	115,651	43.89	+8.89	3	+1
Spanish Socialist Workers' Party (PSOE)	106,835	40.54	–15.13	2	–1
United Left/The Greens–Assembly for Andalusia: Plural Left (IULV–CA)	18,532	7.03	+2.11	0	±0
Union, Progress and Democracy (UPyD)	9,048	3.43	+2.57	0	±0
Andalusian Party (PA)^{1}	4,992	1.89	+0.36	0	±0
Equo (Equo)	2,001	0.76	New	0	±0
Blank Seats (EB)	917	0.35	New	0	±0
Animalist Party Against Mistreatment of Animals (PACMA)	821	0.31	+0.18	0	±0
Communist Party of the Peoples of Spain (PCPE)	444	0.17	+0.09	0	±0
For a Fairer World (PUM+J)	309	0.12	+0.04	0	±0
National Democracy (DN)	296	0.11	+0.04	0	±0
Republicans (RPS)	249	0.09	New	0	±0
Blank ballots	3,412	1.29	+0.32		
Total	263,507			5	±0
Valid votes	263,507	98.77	–0.56		
Invalid votes	3,281	1.23	+0.56		
Votes cast / turnout	266,788	67.93	–1.98		
Abstentions	125,967	32.07	+1.98		
Registered voters	392,755				
Sources
Footnotes: ^{1} Andalusian Party results are compared to Andalusian Coalition totals in the 2008 election.

=== 2008 ===
Summary of the 9 March 2008 Congress of Deputies election results in Huelva
Parties and alliances	Popular vote			Seats	
Parties and alliances	Votes	%	±pp	Total	+/−
Spanish Socialist Workers' Party (PSOE)	149,494	55.67	–0.52	3	±0
People's Party (PP)	93,984	35.00	+4.41	2	±0
United Left/The Greens–Assembly for Andalusia–Alternative (IULV–CA)	13,210	4.92	–0.57	0	±0
Andalusian Coalition (CA)^{1}	4,110	1.53	–4.14	0	±0
Union, Progress and Democracy (UPyD)	2,319	0.86	New	0	±0
The Greens (Verdes)	721	0.27	New	0	±0
Social Democratic Party (PSD)	433	0.16	New	0	±0
Anti-Bullfighting Party Against Mistreatment of Animals (PACMA)	350	0.13	New	0	±0
For a Fairer World (PUM+J)	210	0.08	New	0	±0
Communist Party of the Peoples of Spain (PCPE)	207	0.08	+0.08	0	±0
National Democracy (DN)	200	0.07	+0.03	0	±0
Citizens–Party of the Citizenry (C's)	167	0.06	New	0	±0
Family and Life Party (PFyV)	121	0.05	New	0	±0
Spanish Phalanx of the CNSO (FE de las JONS)	113	0.04	+0.01	0	±0
Humanist Party (PH)	109	0.04	–0.03	0	±0
Spain 2000 (E–2000)	99	0.04	New	0	±0
Spanish Alternative (AES)	81	0.03	New	0	±0
Blank ballots	2,603	0.97	–0.49		
Total	268,531			5	±0
Valid votes	268,531	99.33	+0.02		
Invalid votes	1,804	0.67	–0.02		
Votes cast / turnout	270,335	69.91	–3.29		
Abstentions	116,337	30.09	+3.29		
Registered voters	386,672				
Sources
Footnotes: ^{1} Andalusian Coalition results are compared to the combined totals of Andalusian Party and Socialist Party of Andalusia in the 2004 election.

=== 2004 ===
Summary of the 14 March 2004 Congress of Deputies election results in Huelva
Parties and alliances	Popular vote			Seats	
Parties and alliances	Votes	%	±pp	Total	+/−
Spanish Socialist Workers' Party (PSOE)	154,579	56.19	+9.31	3	±0
People's Party (PP)	84,173	30.59	–9.57	2	±0
United Left/The Greens–Assembly for Andalusia (IULV–CA)	15,097	5.49	–0.92	0	±0
Andalusian Party (PA)	14,542	5.29	+0.56	0	±0
Socialist Party of Andalusia (PSA)	1,055	0.38	New	0	±0
Citizens for Blank Votes (CenB)	351	0.13	New	0	±0
Party of Precarious Workers (PTPRE)	248	0.09	New	0	±0
Humanist Party (PH)	190	0.07	±0.00	0	±0
Democratic and Social Centre (CDS)	162	0.06	+0.01	0	±0
Andalusia Assembly (A)	150	0.05	–0.01	0	±0
Republican Left (IR)	145	0.05	New	0	±0
National Democracy (DN)	116	0.04	New	0	±0
The Phalanx (FE)	93	0.03	–0.01	0	±0
Spanish Phalanx of the CNSO (FE de las JONS)^{1}	91	0.03	±0.00	0	±0
Authentic Phalanx (FA)	68	0.02	New	0	±0
Republican Social Movement (MSR)	52	0.02	New	0	±0
Communist Party of the Peoples of Spain (PCPE)	0	0.00	New	0	±0
Blank ballots	4,009	1.46	+0.30		
Total	275,121			5	±0
Valid votes	275,121	99.31	+0.07		
Invalid votes	1,907	0.69	–0.07		
Votes cast / turnout	277,028	73.20	+6.60		
Abstentions	101,400	26.80	–6.60		
Registered voters	378,428				
Sources
Footnotes: ^{1} Spanish Phalanx of the CNSO results are compared to Independent Spanish Phalanx–Phalanx 2000 totals in the 2000 election.

=== 2000 ===
Summary of the 12 March 2000 Congress of Deputies election results in Huelva
Parties and alliances	Popular vote			Seats	
Parties and alliances	Votes	%	±pp	Total	+/−
Spanish Socialist Workers' Party–Progressives (PSOE–p)	115,071	46.88	–5.27	3	±0
People's Party (PP)	98,575	40.16	+6.26	2	±0
United Left/The Greens–Assembly for Andalusia (IULV–CA)	15,729	6.41	–3.80	0	±0
Andalusian Party (PA)	11,613	4.73	+2.04	0	±0
Andalusian Left (IA)	446	0.18	New	0	±0
Andalusian Nation (NA)	189	0.08	±0.00	0	±0
Humanist Party (PH)	175	0.07	+0.01	0	±0
Andalusia Assembly (A)	141	0.06	New	0	±0
Spain 2000 Platform (ES2000)	138	0.06	New	0	±0
Natural Law Party (PLN)	128	0.05	New	0	±0
Democratic and Social Centre–Centrist Union (CDS–UC)	119	0.05	–0.01	0	±0
The Phalanx (FE)	97	0.04	New	0	±0
Spanish Democratic Party (PADE)	97	0.04	New	0	±0
Independent Spanish Phalanx–Phalanx 2000 (FEI–FE 2000)	76	0.03	New	0	±0
Blank ballots	2,858	1.16	+0.50		
Total	245,452			5	±0
Valid votes	245,452	99.24	+0.09		
Invalid votes	1,891	0.76	–0.09		
Votes cast / turnout	247,343	66.60	–8.71		
Abstentions	124,018	33.40	+8.71		
Registered voters	371,361				

=== 1996 ===
Summary of the 3 March 1996 Congress of Deputies election results in Huelva
Parties and alliances	Popular vote			Seats	
Parties and alliances	Votes	%	±pp	Total	+/−
Spanish Socialist Workers' Party of Andalusia (PSOE–A)	138,259	52.15	–3.71	3	±0
People's Party (PP)	89,882	33.90	+4.59	2	±0
United Left/The Greens–Assembly for Andalusia (IULV–CA)	27,060	10.21	+1.16	0	±0
Andalusian Party (PA)^{1}	7,129	2.69	–0.85	0	±0
Communist Party of the Andalusian People (PCPA)	246	0.09	–0.03	0	±0
Andalusian Nation (NA)	215	0.08	New	0	±0
Humanist Party (PH)	172	0.06	+0.04	0	±0
Centrist Union (UC)	167	0.06	–0.78	0	±0
Workers' Revolutionary Party (PRT)	143	0.05	New	0	±0
Authentic Spanish Phalanx (FEA)	95	0.04	New	0	±0
Blank ballots	1,758	0.66	+0.18		
Total	265,126			5	±0
Valid votes	265,126	99.15	–0.51		
Invalid votes	2,264	0.85	+0.51		
Votes cast / turnout	267,390	75.31	+2.34		
Abstentions	87,657	24.69	–2.34		
Registered voters	355,047				
Sources
Footnotes: ^{1} Andalusian Party results are compared to the combined totals of Andalusian Party and Andalusian Progress Party in the 1993 election.

=== 1993 ===
Summary of the 6 June 1993 Congress of Deputies election results in Huelva
Parties and alliances	Popular vote			Seats	
Parties and alliances	Votes	%	±pp	Total	+/−
Spanish Socialist Workers' Party of Andalusia (PSOE–A)	138,445	55.86	–2.68	3	–1
People's Party (PP)	72,640	29.31	+9.73	2	+1
United Left–Assembly for Andalusia (IU–CA)	22,439	9.05	+1.31	0	±0
Andalusian Party (PA)	7,454	3.01	–2.04	0	±0
Democratic and Social Centre (CDS)	2,093	0.84	–3.84	0	±0
Andalusian Progress Party (PAP)	1,304	0.53	New	0	±0
The Greens of Andalusia (Verdes)^{1}	1,161	0.47	–0.05	0	±0
Liberal Independent Group (GIL)	676	0.27	New	0	±0
The Ecologists (LE)	538	0.22	–0.33	0	±0
Ruiz-Mateos Group–European Democratic Alliance (ARM–ADE)	392	0.16	–1.37	0	±0
Communist Party of the Andalusian People (PCPA)	290	0.12	±0.00	0	±0
Spanish Phalanx of the CNSO (FE–JONS)	109	0.04	–0.06	0	±0
Natural Law Party (PLN)	90	0.04	New	0	±0
Humanist Party (PH)	58	0.02	–0.05	0	±0
Communist Unification of Spain (UCE)	0	0.00	New	0	±0
Blank ballots	1,185	0.48	+0.03		
Total	247,841			5	±0
Valid votes	247,841	99.66	+0.15		
Invalid votes	841	0.34	–0.15		
Votes cast / turnout	248,682	72.97	+6.89		
Abstentions	92,123	27.03	–6.89		
Registered voters	340,805				
Sources
Footnotes: ^{1} The Greens of Andalusia results are compared to The Greens–Green List totals in the 1989 election.

=== 1989 ===
Summary of the 29 October 1989 Congress of Deputies election results in Huelva
Parties and alliances	Popular vote			Seats	
Parties and alliances	Votes	%	±pp	Total	+/−
Spanish Socialist Workers' Party of Andalusia (PSOE–A)	123,126	58.54	–3.68	4	±0
People's Party (PP)^{1}	41,173	19.58	–1.79	1	±0
United Left–Assembly for Andalusia (IU–CA)	16,278	7.74	+2.46	0	±0
Andalusian Party (PA)	10,618	5.05	+2.71	0	±0
Democratic and Social Centre (CDS)	9,846	4.68	–1.06	0	±0
Ruiz-Mateos Group (Ruiz-Mateos)	3,223	1.53	New	0	±0
The Ecologist Greens (LVE)	1,157	0.55	New	0	±0
Workers' Socialist Party (PST)	1,148	0.55	New	0	±0
The Greens–Green List (LV–LV)	1,096	0.52	New	0	±0
Workers' Party of Spain–Communist Unity (PTE–UC)^{2}	998	0.47	–0.43	0	±0
Communist Party of the Andalusian People (PCPA)	262	0.12	New	0	±0
Spanish Phalanx of the CNSO (FE–JONS)	205	0.10	–0.07	0	±0
Humanist Party (PH)	151	0.07	New	0	±
Centrist Unity–Democratic Spanish Party (PED)	98	0.05	New	0	±0
Blank ballots	940	0.45	+0.01		
Total	210,319			5	±0
Valid votes	210,319	99.51	+1.12		
Invalid votes	1,032	0.49	–1.12		
Votes cast / turnout	211,351	66.08	–1.69		
Abstentions	108,513	33.92	+1.69		
Registered voters	319,864				
Sources
Footnotes: ^{1} People's Party results are compared to People's Coalition totals in the 1986 election.; ^{2} Workers' Party of Spain–Communist Unity results are compared to Communists' Unity Board totals in the 1986 election.

=== 1986 ===
Summary of the 22 June 1986 Congress of Deputies election results in Huelva
Parties and alliances	Popular vote			Seats	
Parties and alliances	Votes	%	±pp	Total	+/−
Spanish Socialist Workers' Party (PSOE)	130,386	62.22	–1.14	4	±0
People's Coalition (AP–PDP–PL)^{1}	44,778	21.37	+0.58	1	±0
Democratic and Social Centre (CDS)	12,034	5.74	+4.38	0	±0
United Left (IU)^{2}	11,068	5.28	+1.66	0	±0
Andalusian Party (PA)	4,910	2.34	+0.63	0	±0
Communists' Unity Board (MUC)	1,889	0.90	New	0	±0
Democratic Reformist Party (PRD)	1,698	0.81	New	0	±0
Socialist Party of the Andalusian People (PSPA)	1,041	0.50	New	0	±0
Communist Unification of Spain (UCE)	445	0.21	+0.09	0	±0
Spanish Phalanx of the CNSO (FE–JONS)	361	0.17	New	0	±0
Blank ballots	931	0.44	+0.18		
Total	209,541			5	±0
Valid votes	209,541	98.39	–0.26		
Invalid votes	3,425	1.61	+0.26		
Votes cast / turnout	212,966	67.77	–9.61		
Abstentions	101,280	32.23	+9.61		
Registered voters	314,246				
Sources
Footnotes: ^{1} People's Coalition results are compared to People's Alliance–People's Democratic Party totals in the 1982 election.; ^{2} United Left results are compared to Communist Party of Andalusia totals in the 1982 election.

=== 1982 ===
Summary of the 28 October 1982 Congress of Deputies election results in Huelva
Parties and alliances	Popular vote			Seats	
Parties and alliances	Votes	%	±pp	Total	+/−
Spanish Socialist Workers' Party of Andalusia (PSA–PSOE)	139,420	63.36	+27.95	4	+2
People's Alliance–People's Democratic Party (AP–PDP)^{1}	45,755	20.79	+17.49	1	+1
Union of the Democratic Centre (UCD)	17,174	7.80	–29.49	0	–3
Communist Party of Andalusia (PCA–PCE)	7,976	3.62	–3.38	0	±0
Socialist Party of Andalusia–Andalusian Party (PSA–PA)	3,752	1.71	–7.90	0	±0
Democratic and Social Centre (CDS)	3,003	1.36	New	0	±0
Workers' Socialist Party (PST)	812	0.37	New	0	±0
New Force (FN)^{2}	696	0.32	–1.31	0	±0
Communist Unification of Spain (UCE)	266	0.12	New	0	±0
Spanish Solidarity (SE)	259	0.12	New	0	±0
Communist Unity Candidacy (CUC)^{3}	238	0.11	–0.18	0	±0
Falangist Movement of Spain (MFE)	137	0.06	New	0	±0
Socialist Party (PS)^{4}	0	0.00	–1.09	0	±0
Revolutionary Communist League (LCR)	0	0.00	–0.39	0	±0
Communist Movement of Andalusia (MCA)	0	0.00	–0.27	0	±0
Blank ballots	563	0.26	+0.08		
Total	220,051			5	±0
Valid votes	220,051	98.65	–0.23		
Invalid votes	3,019	1.35	+0.23		
Votes cast / turnout	223,070	77.38	+11.26		
Abstentions	65,215	22.62	–11.26		
Registered voters	288,285				
Sources
Footnotes: ^{1} People's Alliance–People's Democratic Party results are compared to Democratic Coalition totals in the 1979 election.; ^{2} New Force results are compared to National Union totals in the 1979 election.; ^{3} Communist Unity Candidacy results are compared to Workers' Communist Party totals in the 1979 election.; ^{4} Socialist Party results are compared to Spanish Socialist Workers' Party (historical) totals in the 1979 election.

=== 1979 ===
Summary of the 1 March 1979 Congress of Deputies election results in Huelva
Parties and alliances	Popular vote			Seats	
Parties and alliances	Votes	%	±pp	Total	+/−
Union of the Democratic Centre (UCD)	68,756	37.29	–10.50	3	±0
Spanish Socialist Workers' Party (PSOE)^{1}	65,302	35.41	–0.90	2	±0
Socialist Party of Andalusia–Andalusian Party (PSA–PA)	17,720	9.61	New	0	±0
Communist Party of Spain (PCE)	12,913	7.00	+1.54	0	±0
Democratic Coalition (CD)^{2}	6,080	3.30	–1.73	0	±0
Workers' Revolutionary Organization (ORT)^{3}	4,330	2.35	+0.76	0	±0
National Union (UN)	3,010	1.63	New	0	±0
Spanish Socialist Workers' Party (historical) (PSOEh)^{4}	2,009	1.09	–0.09	0	±0
Party of Labour of Spain (PTE)^{5}	1,099	0.60	+0.07	0	±0
Revolutionary Communist League (LCR)	718	0.39	New	0	±0
Workers' Communist Party (PCT)	539	0.29	New	0	±0
Communist Movement–Organization of Communist Left (MC–OIC)	505	0.27	New	0	±0
Communist Organization of Spain (Red Flag) (OCE–BR)	393	0.21	New	0	±0
Carlist Party (PC)	375	0.20	New	0	±0
Spanish Phalanx of the CNSO (Authentic) (FE–JONS(A))	314	0.17	New	0	±0
Union for the Freedom of Speech (ULE)	9	0.00	New	0	±0
Blank ballots	332	0.18	+0.02		
Total	184,404			5	±0
Valid votes	184,404	98.88	+0.31		
Invalid votes	2,094	1.12	–0.31		
Votes cast / turnout	186,498	66.12	–8.21		
Abstentions	95,577	33.88	+8.21		
Registered voters	282,075				
Sources
Footnotes: ^{1} Spanish Socialist Workers' Party results are compared to the combined totals of Spanish Socialist Workers' Party and People's Socialist Party–Socialist Unity in the 1977 election.; ^{2} Democratic Coalition results are compared to People's Alliance totals in the 1977 election.; ^{3} Workers' Revolutionary Organization results are compared to Workers' Electoral Group totals in the 1977 election.; ^{4} Spanish Socialist Workers' Party (historical) results are compared to Democratic Socialist Alliance totals in the 1977 election.; ^{5} Party of Labour of Spain results are compared to Democratic Left Front totals in the 1977 election.

=== 1977 ===
Summary of the 15 June 1977 Congress of Deputies election results in Huelva
Parties and alliances	Popular vote			Seats	
Parties and alliances	Votes	%	±pp	Total	+/−
Union of the Democratic Centre (UCD)	89,494	47.79	n/a	3	n/a
Spanish Socialist Workers' Party (PSOE)	63,172	33.74	n/a	2	n/a
Communist Party of Spain (PCE)	10,217	5.46	n/a	0	n/a
People's Alliance (AP)	9,415	5.03	n/a	0	n/a
People's Socialist Party–Socialist Unity (PSP–US)	4,819	2.57	n/a	0	n/a
Workers' Electoral Group (AET)	2,974	1.59	n/a	0	n/a
Federation of Christian Democracy (FPD–ID)	2,604	1.39	n/a	0	n/a
Democratic Socialist Alliance (ASDCI)	2,214	1.18	n/a	0	n/a
Spanish Social Reform (RSE)	1,059	0.57	n/a	0	n/a
Democratic Left Front (FDI)	988	0.53	n/a	0	n/a
Blank ballots	295	0.16	n/a		
Total	187,251			5	n/a
Valid votes	187,251	98.57	n/a		
Invalid votes	2,710	1.43	n/a		
Votes cast / turnout	189,961	74.33	n/a		
Abstentions	65,596	25.67	n/a		
Registered voters	255,557				

== Bibliography ==
- Ley 1/1977, de 4 de enero, para la Reforma Política (Fundamental Law 1/1977). Official State Gazette (in Spanish). 4 January 1977. BOE-A-1977-165.
- Real Decreto-ley 20/1977, de 18 de marzo, sobre Normas Electorales (Royal Decree-Law 20/1977). Official State Gazette (in Spanish). 18 March 1977. BOE-A-1977-7445.
- Constitución Española (Constitution). Official State Gazette (in Spanish). 27 December 1978. BOE-A-1978-31229.
- Ley Orgánica 5/1985, de 19 de junio, del Régimen Electoral General (Organic Law 5/1985). Official State Gazette (in Spanish). 19 June 1985. BOE-A-1985-11672.
- Carreras de Odriozola, Albert; Tafunell Sambola, Xavier (2005) [1989]. Estadísticas históricas de España, siglos XIX-XX (PDF) (in Spanish). Vol. 1 (II ed.). Bilbao: Fundación BBVA. pp. 1072–1097. ISBN 84-96515-00-1. Archived from the original (PDF) on 24 September 2015.
