= La Sinistra =

La Sinistra (Italian for: The Left) may refer to:

- The Left – The Rainbow, (Italian: La Sinistra – L'Arcobaleno), political party in Italy formed in 2007
- The Left (Italy), (Italian: La Sinistra), political coalition in Italy formed in 2019
- The Left (Switzerland), (Italian: La Sinistra), political party in Switzerland formed in 2010

== See also ==
- Nu Ophiuchi, a star sometimes referred to by the alternate name Sinistra
- Frédéric Sinistra (1981–2021), Belgian kickboxer
- The Left (disambiguation)
