= Socialist Party of Andalusia =

Socialist Party of Andalusia may refer to:

- Andalusian Party, known as "Socialist Party of Andalusia" name from 1976 to 1979 and as "Socialist Party of Andalusia–Andalusian Party" from 1979 to 1984.
- Socialist Party of Andalusia (2001), split from the Andalusian Party which existed from 2001 to 2011.
- Spanish Socialist Workers' Party of Andalusia, the Andalusian branch of the Spanish Socialist Workers' Party.
