= The Left =

The Left may refer to:

- Left-wing politics in general or to the following political parties or alliances:
  - The Left (Bulgaria) or Levitsata!
  - The Left (Czech Republic) or Levice
  - Die Linke, also known as The Left
  - Left Democratic Front, political alliance in Kerala
  - The Left (Italy) or La Sinistra
  - The Left (Luxembourg) or Déi Lénk
  - The Left (North Macedonia) or Levica
  - The Left (Poland) or Lewica
  - The Left (Slovenia) or Levica
  - The Left (Spain) or La Izquierda
  - The Left (Switzerland) or Die Linke, also known as the Alternative Left (Alternative Linke)
  - The Left in the European Parliament – GUE/NGL
- The Left (band), American hip hop group

== See also ==
- La Gauche (disambiguation)
- Left Party (disambiguation)
- Left Alliance (disambiguation)
- Lewica (disambiguation)
