= Democratic Left Alliance =

Democratic Left Alliance may refer to:

- Democratic Left Alliance (Poland)
- Democratic Left Alliance (Nepal)

== See also ==
- Left Alliance (disambiguation)
