= La Gauche =

La Gauche (French for: The Left) may refer to:

- The Left (Luxembourg), (French: La Gauche), political party in Luxembourg
- The Left (Switzerland), (French: La Gauche), political party in Switzerland

== See also ==
- The Left (disambiguation)
