= National Front (Spain, 2006) =

Spanish political party (2006–2011)

National Front Frente Nacional
- Leader: José Fernando Cantalapiedra
- Founded: June 2006
- Dissolved: 2011
- Youth wing: Nuevas Generaciones (New Generations)
- Ideology: Third Position; Fascism; Spanish nationalism
- Political position: Far-right
- International affiliation: None
- Colours: Blue and yellow

Party flag

The National Front (Spanish: Frente Nacional) was a Spanish political party founded by José Fernando Cantalapiedra in 2006.

In June 2006, Cantalapiedra registered a new Frente Nacional with the Interior Ministry's Register of Political Parties. It shares a name with an unrelated political party founded by Blas Piñar, which existed between 1985 and 1993. Similar to the previous party of the same name, the new National Front goes by the initials, FrN. The new National Front party claims to stand for political and social reform, with similar messages to the National Democracy party.

On 28 October 2007, 500 people turned out to a National Front demonstration at the monument of Christopher Columbus, in Madrid. Later that year, on 11 November, the party held a demonstration in Madrid calling for employers to have the right to implement "Spaniards first" policies in regards to their workforces, and to demand a tougher stance on crime which the party believes is contributed to by mass immigration and illegal immigration. Since that time, the FRN has hosted various regional presentations. The FRN hoped to win seats in the 2009 European Parliament election but was unsuccessful.

The FRN joined a demonstration held on 14 May 2008 in the Barrio de Salamanca area of Madrid, protesting against the transfer of a municipal building to Arabic House (an organisation created to help further knowledge and learning of the Muslim and Arab world).

Currently, the FRN claims to have 20 branches throughout Spain with most of their membership living in Madrid and the northern provinces.

== Elections results ==
=== European Parliament ===
Election year	# of total votes	% of overall vote	# of seats won	Rank
2009	7,970 ▲	0.05% ▲	0 / 12	22 ▲
