= Lewica =

Lewica literally meaning "the left" in Polish may refer to the following Polish left-wing parties:

- Polish Socialist Party – Left
- The Left (Poland)
- Partia Razem
- Polish People's Party "Left" (Polskie Stronnictwo Ludowe "Lewica")
- Polish Left (Polska Lewica)

== See also ==
- United Left (Poland) (Zjednoczona Lewica)
- The Left (disambiguation)
