= Leftist Alliance =

Defunct Egyptian electoral alliance

- Founded: 2015
- Ideology: Socialism; Factions: Nasserism; Democratic socialism Communism; Marxism-Leninism; Left-wing nationalism Left-wing populism Anti-capitalism; Anti-imperialism; Anti-Zionism
- Political position: Left-wing to far-left

The Leftist Alliance was an alliance of leftist political parties that would have run for individual seats in the 2015 Egyptian parliamentary election, though each party will run individually.

== Affiliated parties ==
- Tagammu
- Socialist Popular Alliance Party
- Egyptian Communist Party
- Socialist Party of Egypt
