= The Left (Spain) =

Spanish electoral alliance

The Left La Izquierda
- Leader: Willy Meyer
- Founded: 2009
- Dissolved: 2014
- Merger of: United Left; ICV; EUiA; EB–B; Bloc for Asturias
- Succeeded by: Plural Left
- Ideology: Socialism; Anti-capitalism; Feminism; Ecologism
- European affiliation: European United Left–Nordic Green Left; The Greens–European Free Alliance

The Left (Spanish: La Izquierda) was a Spanish electoral alliance formed to contest the 2009 European Parliament election in Spain made up from both national and regional left wing parties.

== Composition ==
Party	Scope
United Left (IU)	—
Initiative for Catalonia Greens–United and Alternative Left (ICV–EUiA)	Catalonia
Bloc for Asturias (BA)	Asturias
Republican Left (IR)	-
The Greens of the Balearic Islands (EVIB)	Balearic Islands

== Electoral performance ==
=== European Parliament ===
European Parliament
Election	Seats	Vote	%
2009	2 / 54	588,248 (#4)	3.71
