= Left Alliance =

The Left Alliance is the name of a number of left wing political parties:

- Left Democratic Alliance in Bangladesh
- Alliance of the Left in Spain.
- Democratic Left Alliance (Poland) in Poland.
- Left Alliance (Finland)
- RISE – Scotland's Left Alliance
- Left Alliance - UK, a grouping including the Union of Liberal Students and the Communist Party of Great Britain
- Nordic Green Left Alliance, an alliance of Nordic left-wing parties
- Left Alliance (Australia), an Australian student movement that flourished in the 1980s and 1990s
- Leftist Alliance (Hungary), an alliance between Yes Solidarity for Hungary Movement and the Hungarian Workers' Party
- Leftist Alliance
