= Republican Social Movement =

Republican Social Movement Movimiento Social Republicano
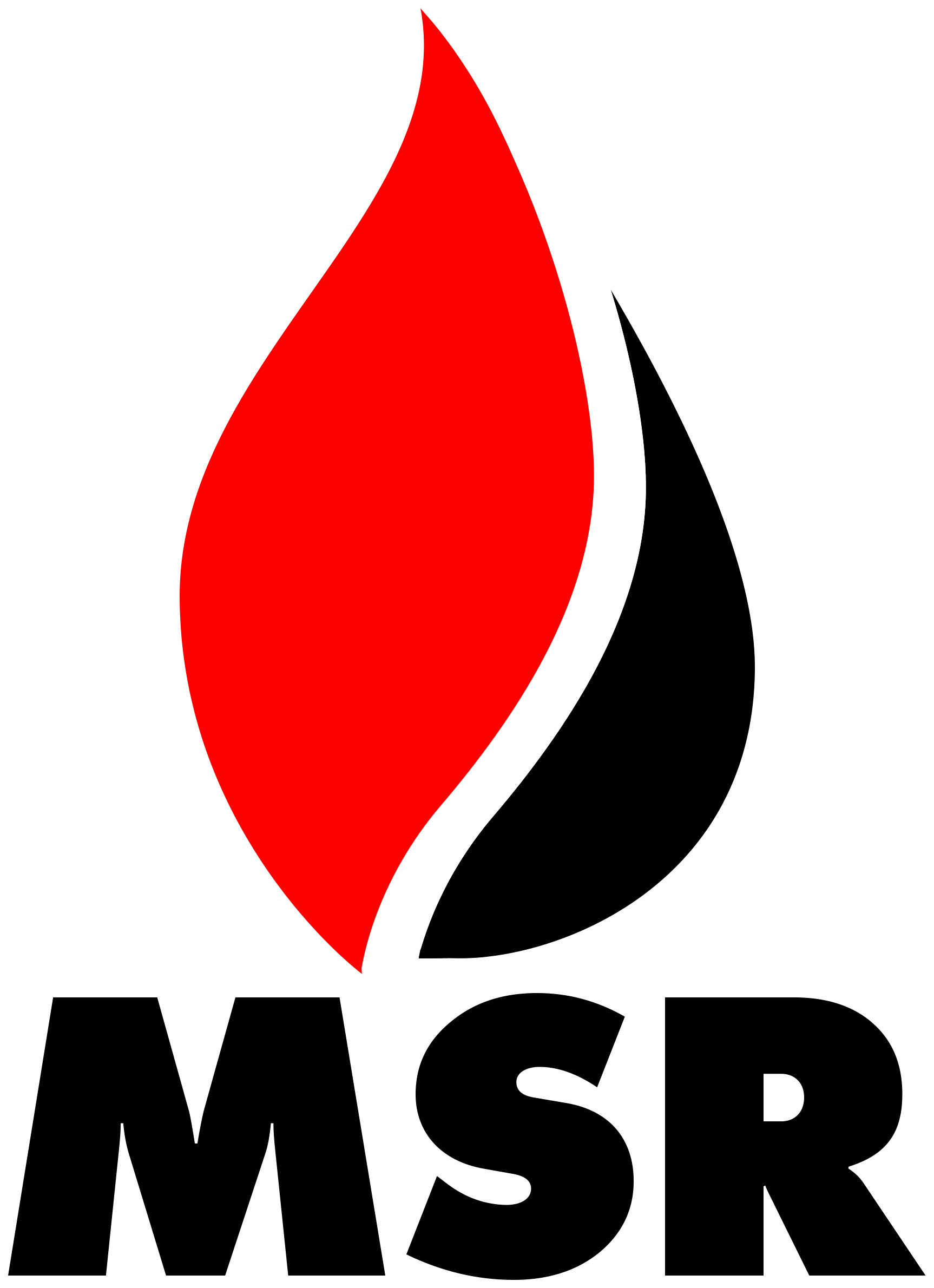
- Secretary: Antonio Martínez Cayuela
- Founded: 1999
- Dissolved: 2018
- Ideology: Republicanism; Neo-fascism; Neo-nazism
- Political position: Far-right

Party flag

Website
- www.msr.org.es

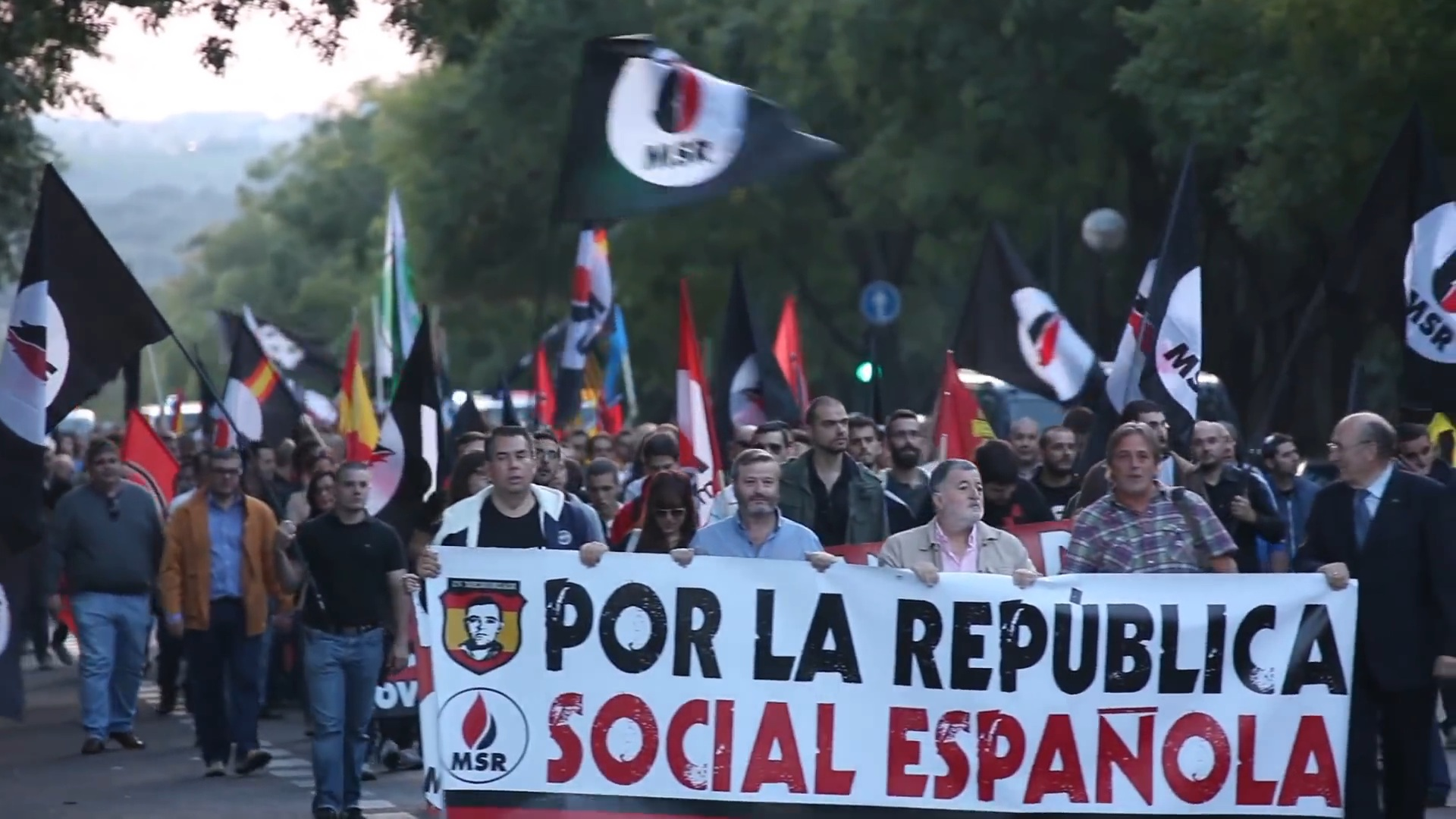
MSR demonstration in 2013.

The Republican Social Movement (Spanish: Movimiento Social Republicano, MSR) was a far-right political party in Spain. It was registered at the Ministry of Interior on November 30, 1999, with offices in Barcelona. The following year it merged with Vértice Social Español to form what it called a "Social Patriotic Force".

By its members' own admission, as well as by that of the bulk of the far-right public opinion, the MSR was roughly inscribed in what is usually called the Third Position, and adheres to the commonplace strategy of defending socializing (and at times leftist) doctrines abroad, whereas adopting conservative and anti-immigration stances at a domestic level. Its slogan was 'Spain-Republic-Socialization'.

In the VII National Congress all the participants decided to terminate the movement's experience. MSR dissolved itself with an official announcement 30 of January 2018.

== Policies ==
The party has campaigned against immigration into Spain, Turkish membership of the European Union and global capitalism. They support a large programme of re-nationalisation of industries such as electricity and transport. In terms of foreign policies the party takes a strongly pro-Palestinian approach to the Middle East question, criticising Israel alleging that the "Zionist army are committing daily crimes against the Palestinian people." In addition to supporting the Venezuelan government of Hugo Chavez, they have also called for the withdrawal of Spanish troops in the Balkans and condemned the American led invasion of Iraq. In the 2000 General Election the party supported the platform of España 2000.

== Press ==
The party publishes Tribuna de Europa and Libertad.

== Sectoral organizations ==
- Labour: Unión Sindical de Trabajadores - UST
- Youth: Liga Joven
- Ecology: Hispania Verde
- Think-tank: Alternativa Europea
- Culture: Círculo de Estudios La Emboscadura - CELE

== Elections results ==
=== Congress of Deputies / Senate ===
Election	Congress of Deputies					Senate		Rank	Government	Leader
Election	Votes	%	±pp	Seats won	+/−	Seats won	+/−	Rank	Government	Leader
2004	6,768	0.03%	▲	0 / 470	±0	—N/a	—N/a	#36	No seats	

=== European Parliament ===
Election year	# of total votes	% of overall vote	# of seats won	Rank
2009	6,009 ▲	0.04% ▲	0 / 12	26 ▲
2014	8,909 ▲	0.06% ▲	0 / 12	31 ▲

== Bibliography ==
- Büttner, Frauke (2011). Right-wing extremism in Spain: Between parliamentary right-wing extremism in Spain: Between parliamentary insignificance, far-right populism and racist violence (PDF). Friedrich-Ebert-Stiftung, Forum Berlin. p. 181. ISBN 978-3-86872-617-6.
