= Socialist Party of Andalusia (2001) =

Socialist Party of Andalusia Partido Socialista de Andalucía
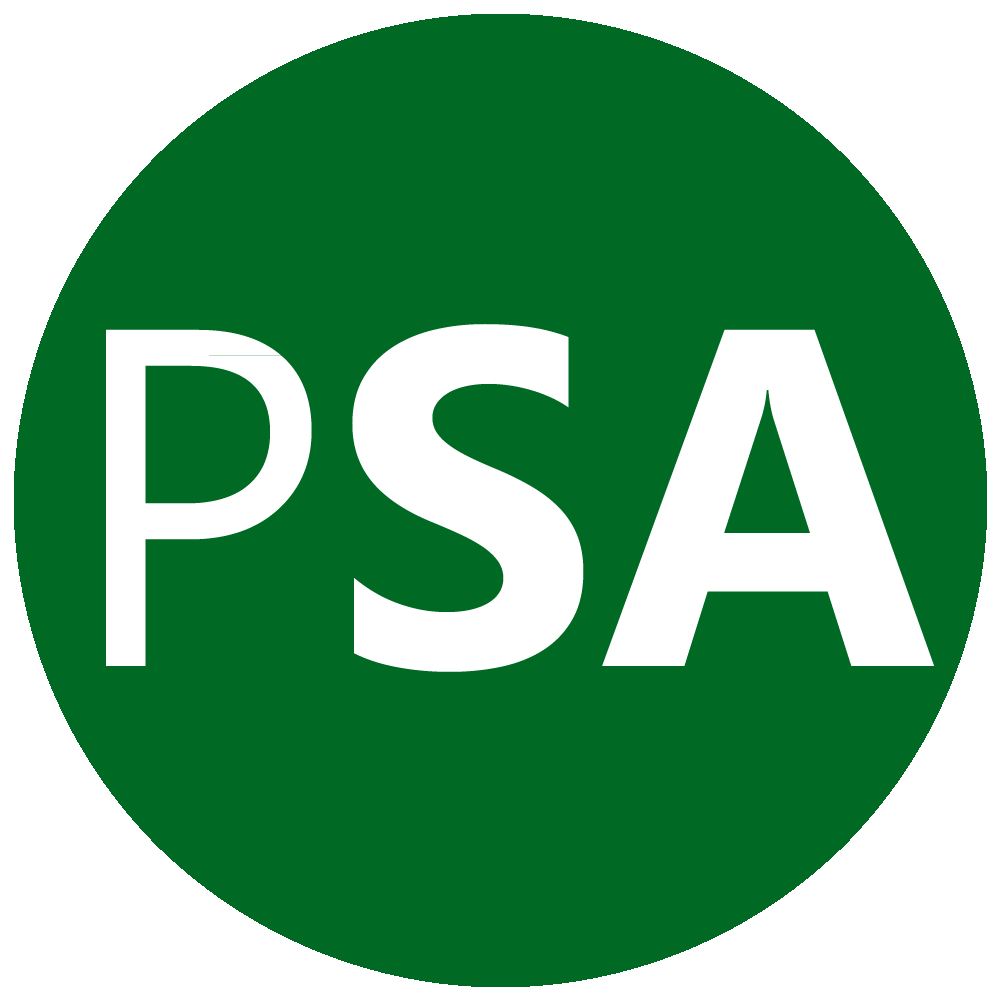
- Leader: Pedro Pacheco (until 2008)
- Founded: 2001
- Dissolved: 2011
- Youth wing: Andalusian Nationalist Youth
- Ideology: Andalusian nationalism Social democracy Progressivism
- Colors: Green; White

Website
- partidosocialistadeandalucia.es

Socialist Party of Andalusia (Spanish: Partido Socialista de Andalucía; PSA) was an Andalusian nationalist and social-democratic political party in Andalusia. The party was founded by the then mayor of Jérez de la Frontera, Pedro Pacheco. In 2011 the party rejoined the Andalusian Party (PA).

== History ==
The party was founded by Pedro Pacheco and his followers after a personal leadership dispute with the president of the PA. The first elections for the PSA were the municipal elections of 2003, in which the party won 55 local representatives. The party run for the Andalusian regional elections of 2004, obtaining the 0.94% of the vote and no seats. in the municipal elections of 2007 the PSA won 64 local representatives. At the 2nd congress of the party (November 2008), Pedro Pacheco left his leadership positions.

After this series of electoral failures, the PSA run in a coalition with the PA for the Andalusian regional elections of 2008, failing again to obtain any seat. PSA continued to cooperate with the PA until their full reunification in 2011. Pedro Pacheco didn't join the reunified PA and founded another party, Andalusian Platform-Citizen Forum.
