= Sub-national opinion polling for the November 2019 Spanish general election =

In the run up to the November 2019 Spanish general election, various organisations carried out opinion polling to gauge voting intention in autonomous communities and constituencies in Spain during the term of the 13th Cortes Generales. Results of such polls are displayed in this article. The date range for these opinion polls is from the previous general election, held on 28 April 2019, to the day the next election was held, on 10 November 2019.

Voting intention estimates refer mainly to a hypothetical Congress of Deputies election. Polls are listed in reverse chronological order, showing the most recent first and using the dates when the survey fieldwork was done, as opposed to the date of publication. Where the fieldwork dates are unknown, the date of publication is given instead. The highest percentage figure in each polling survey is displayed with its background shaded in the leading party's colour. If a tie ensues, this is applied to the figures with the highest percentages. The "Lead" columns on the right shows the percentage-point difference between the parties with the highest percentages in a given poll.

Refusals are generally excluded from the party vote percentages, while question wording and the treatment of "don't know" responses and those not intending to vote may vary between polling organisations. When available, seat projections are displayed below the percentages in a smaller font.

== Autonomous communities ==
=== Andalusia ===
Color key:

Poll conducted after legal ban on opinion polls

Polling firm/Commissioner	Fieldwork date	Sample size	Turnout	PSOE	Cs	PP	Unidas Podemos	Vox	Más País	Lead
November 2019 general election	10 Nov 2019	—N/a	65.9	33.4; 25	8.1; 3	20.5; 15	13.1; 6	20.4; 12	1.3; 0	12.9
GAD3/RTVE–FORTA	25 Oct–10 Nov 2019	?	?	? 24/25	? 3	? 14/15	? 6	? 12/14	–	?
GAD3/Vocento	14–31 Oct 2019	1,200	?	33.0; 25	9.0; 3	22.0; 15/16	11.0; 5/6	19.0; 12	–	11.0
Sigma Dos/Antena 3	27 Oct 2019	?	?	? 24/26	? 3/5	? 12/14	? 9	? 10/11	? 0	?
CIS	21 Sep–13 Oct 2019	3,019	?	? 27/30	? 8/9	? 9/11	? 7/9	? 5/6	? 0	?
SW Demoscopia/Grupo Viva	30 Sep–4 Oct 2019	1,009	?	30.3; 21/24	10.5; 4/7	24.4; 15/18	13.1; 6/9	12.8; 5/7	6.3; 2/5	5.9
2019 EP election	26 May 2019	—N/a	60.6	40.5 (32)	13.0 (7)	22.2 (14)	11.6 (6)	7.6 (2)	–	18.3
April 2019 general election	28 Apr 2019	—N/a	70.8	34.2; 24	17.7; 11	17.2; 11	14.3; 9	13.4; 6	–	16.5

=== Aragon ===
Color key:

Poll conducted after legal ban on opinion polls

Polling firm/Commissioner	Fieldwork date	Sample size	Turnout	PSOE	Cs	PP	Unidas Podemos	Vox	Mas País–CHA–Equo	¡TE!	Lead
November 2019 general election	10 Nov 2019	—N/a	69.3	30.7; 6	8.6; 0	23.9; 4	10.8; 1	17.0; 1	3.3; 0	2.8; 1	6.8
GAD3/RTVE–FORTA	25 Oct–10 Nov 2019	?	?	30.0; 4	11.0; 1	22.0; 4	11.0; 1	19.0; 2	–	2.0; 1	8.0
A+M/El Heraldo de Aragón	28–31 Oct 2019	1,500	67.7	30.8; 5/6	11.2; 1	25.7; 4	10.8; 0/1	13.6; 1	1.4; 0	3.7; 1	5.3
GAD3/Vocento	14–31 Oct 2019	?	?	? 5	? 1	? 4	? 1	? 1	? 0	? 1	?
A+M/El Heraldo de Aragón	8–15 Oct 2019	1,540	64.9	27.0; 4/5	15.2; 1/2	23.1; 4	10.4; 1	13.2; 1	4.7; 0	3.6; 1	3.9
CIS	21 Sep–13 Oct 2019	996	?	? 7	? 0/1	? 4	? 1	? 0/1	? 0	? 0	?
2019 EP election	26 May 2019	—N/a	65.0	36.2 (7)	17.3 (4)	21.7 (1)	10.4 (1)	7.9 (0)	2.0 (0)	–	14.5
April 2019 general election	28 Apr 2019	—N/a	75.2	31.7; 5	20.5; 3	18.9; 3	13.6; 1	12.2; 1	–	–	11.2

=== Asturias ===
Color key:

Poll conducted after legal ban on opinion polls

Polling firm/Commissioner	Fieldwork date	Sample size	Turnout	PSOE	PP	Unidas Podemos	Cs	Vox	Más País–Equo	Lead
November 2019 general election	10 Nov 2019	—N/a	58.1	33.3; 3	23.2; 2	16.0; 1	6.7; 0	15.9; 1	2.3; 0	10.1
GAD3/RTVE–FORTA	25 Oct–10 Nov 2019	?	?	? 3/4	? 2	? 1	? 0	? 1	? 0	?
GAD3/Vocento	14–31 Oct 2019	500	?	32.0; 3	23.0; 2	14.0; 1	9.0; 0	17.0; 1	? 0	9.0
CIS	21 Sep–13 Oct 2019	399	?	? 3/4	? 1/2	? 1	? 1	? 0	? 0	?
2019 EP election	26 May 2019	—N/a	54.1	38.6 (4)	19.0 (1)	14.7 (1)	13.6 (1)	7.4 (0)	–	19.6
April 2019 general election	28 Apr 2019	—N/a	65.0	33.1; 3	17.9; 1	17.1; 1	16.7; 1	11.5; 1	–	15.2

=== Balearic Islands ===
Color key:

Poll conducted after legal ban on opinion polls

Polling firm/Commissioner	Fieldwork date	Sample size	Turnout	PSOE	Unidas Podemos	Cs	PP	Vox	Més Esquerra	Más País	Lead
November 2019 general election	10 Nov 2019	—N/a	56.8	25.4; 2	18.1; 2	7.4; 0	22.8; 2	17.1; 2	4.0; 0	2.3; 0	2.6
GAD3/RTVE–FORTA	25 Oct–10 Nov 2019	?	?	25.0; 2	15.0; 1	9.0; 1	20.0; 2	18.0; 2	–	–	5.0
GAD3/Vocento	14–31 Oct 2019	?	?	? 3	? 1	? 1	? 2	? 1	–	–	?
IBES/Última Hora	21–28 Oct 2019	900	?	25.0; 2/3	15.0; 1/2	10.0; 0/1	21.0; 2	14.0; 1	5.0; 0	6.0; 0	4.0
CIS	21 Sep–13 Oct 2019	398	?	? 4	? 1/2	? 2	? 1	? 0/1	–	–	?
2019 EP election	26 May 2019	—N/a	51.5	29.3 (3)	10.5 (1)	11.8 (1)	21.2 (2)	7.7 (1)	3.0 (Note: Result for More for Mallorca.) (0)	–	8.1
April 2019 general election	28 Apr 2019	—N/a	65.4	26.4; 3	17.8; 2	17.4; 1	16.8; 1	11.3; 1	4.9 (Note: Result for Progressive Voices.); 0	–	8.6

=== Basque Country ===
Color key:

Poll conducted after legal ban on opinion polls

Polling firm/Commissioner	Fieldwork date	Sample size	Turnout	PNV	PSE–EE	Unidas Podemos	EH Bildu	PP	Cs	Vox	Más País	Lead
November 2019 general election	10 Nov 2019	—N/a	66.4	32.0; 6	19.2; 4	15.4; 3	18.7; 4	8.9; 1	1.1; 0	2.5; 0	0.7; 0	12.8
GAD3/RTVE–FORTA	25 Oct–10 Nov 2019	?	?	31.0; 6/7	19.0; 4	15.0; 2/3	17.0; 3/4	9.0; 1/2	2.0; 0	4.0; 0	–	?
GAD3/Vocento	14–31 Oct 2019	?	?	31.6; 6	20.2; 4	14.7; 2/3	15.1; 3/4	10.0; 2	1.7; 0	3.3; 0	0.5; 0	11.4
Gizaker/EITB	28–30 Oct 2019	1,200	67.4	32.6; 7	19.7; 4	14.9; 2/3	18.3; 4	7.7; 0/1	2.4; 0	2.1; 0	1.1; 0	8.2
CIS	21 Sep–13 Oct 2019	861	?	? 6/7	? 4/5	? 3	? 4	? 0	? 0	? 0	? 0	?
Ikertalde/GPS	1–9 Oct 2019	2,170	66.2	31.8; 7	19.2; 4	15.8; 3	17.2; 4	8.2; 0	2.0; 0	2.8; 0	1.0; 0	12.6
Gizaker/EITB	20–23 Sep 2019	1,200	68.0	30.4; 6/7	22.2; 4	15.5; 3	16.5; 3	9.5; 1/2	2.9; 0	1.7; 0	–	8.2
2019 EP election	26 May 2019	—N/a	62.9	33.9 (9)	19.0 (4)	11.1 (1)	22.0 (4)	6.4 (0)	2.7 (0)	1.2 (0)	–	11.9
2019 foral elections	26 May 2019	—N/a	65.9	38.7 (8)	17.0 (3)	9.9 (1)	23.8 (5)	7.2 (1)	1.3 (0)	0.7 (0)	–	14.9
April 2019 general election	28 Apr 2019	—N/a	71.8	31.0; 6	19.9; 4	17.6; 4	16.7; 4	7.5; 0	3.2; 0	2.2; 0	–	11.1

=== Canary Islands ===
Color key:

Poll conducted after legal ban on opinion polls

Polling firm/Commissioner	Fieldwork date	Sample size	Turnout	PSOE	Unidas Podemos	PP	Cs	CC–NCa	Vox	NCa	Lead
November 2019 general election	10 Nov 2019	—N/a	55.4	28.9; 5	14.7; 2	20.8; 4	5.4; 0	13.1; 2	12.5; 2	(Note: Within CCa.)	8.1
GAD3/RTVE–FORTA	25 Oct–10 Nov 2019	?	?	? 5/6	? 2	? 3/4	? 0/1	? 1/2	? 2		?
Perfiles	2 Nov 2019	1,200	?	31.0– 32.0; 6/8	15.0– 16.0; 2/3	16.0– 17.0; 3	7.0– 8.0; 0/1	12.0– 13.0; 2/3	7.0– 8.0; 0/2		15.0
GAD3/Vocento	14–31 Oct 2019	600	?	30.0; 6	13.5; 2	21.5; 4	8.5; 1	10.0; 1	10.5; 1		8.5
CIS	21 Sep–13 Oct 2019	690	?	? 6	? 2	? 3	? 2	? 1/2	? 0/1		?
2019 EP election	26 May 2019	—N/a	51.4	32.0 (7)	10.4 (2)	15.8 (2)	7.6 (1)	20.8 (3)	3.3 (0)	4.3 (0)	11.2
April 2019 general election	28 Apr 2019	—N/a	62.5	27.8; 5	15.7; 3	15.5; 3	14.7; 2	13.0; 2	6.6; 0	3.4; 0	12.1

=== Cantabria ===
Color key:

Poll conducted after legal ban on opinion polls

Polling firm/Commissioner	Fieldwork date	Sample size	Turnout	PSOE	PP	Cs	PRC	Vox	Unidas Podemos	Lead
November 2019 general election	10 Nov 2019	—N/a	65.7	23.2; 1	25.9; 2	4.8; 0	21.0; 1	14.9; 1	8.7; 0	2.7
GAD3/RTVE–FORTA	25 Oct–10 Nov 2019	?	?	? 1/2	? 2	? 0	? 0/1	? 1	? 0	?
PRC	3 Nov 2019	965	?	23.1; 1/2	25.6; 2	5.5; 0	24.1; 1/2	12.0; 0/1	8.2; 0	1.5
GAD3/Vocento	14–31 Oct 2019	500	?	24.0; 1/2	28.0; 1/2	8.0; 0	13.0; 1	16.0; 1	8.0; 0	4.0
CIS	21 Sep–13 Oct 2019	300	?	? 2	? 2	? 0/1	? 0/1	? 0	? 0	Tie
2019 EP election	26 May 2019	—N/a	63.0	37.5 (2)	27.1 (2)	14.0 (1)	–	6.8 (0)	8.6 (0)	10.4
April 2019 general election	28 Apr 2019	—N/a	72.4	25.2; 2	21.7; 1	15.1; 1	14.6; 1	11.2; 0	10.2; 0	3.5

=== Castile and León ===
Color key:

Poll conducted after legal ban on opinion polls

Polling firm/Commissioner	Fieldwork date	Sample size	Turnout	PSOE	PP	Cs	Vox	Unidas Podemos	Lead
November 2019 general election	10 Nov 2019	—N/a	66.6	31.3; 12	31.6; 13	7.6; 0	16.6; 6	9.3; 0	0.3
GAD3/RTVE–FORTA	25 Oct–10 Nov 2019	?	?	? 11	? 13	? 0	? 7	? 0	?
GAD3/Vocento	14–31 Oct 2019	1,000	?	28.0; 11	33.0; 14	9.0; 0	17.0; 6	8.0; 0	5.0
CIS	21 Sep–13 Oct 2019	2,667	?	? 13/16	? 14/15	? 0/2	? 0	? 1	Tie
2019 EP election	26 May 2019	—N/a	64.5	35.0 (16)	30.1 (13)	15.1 (2)	7.2 (0)	8.1 (0)	4.9
April 2019 general election	28 Apr 2019	—N/a	72.9	29.8; 12	26.0; 10	18.9; 8	12.3; 1	10.4; 0	3.8

=== Castilla–La Mancha ===
Color key:

Poll conducted after legal ban on opinion polls

Polling firm/Commissioner	Fieldwork date	Sample size	Turnout	PSOE	PP	Cs	Vox	Unidas Podemos	Lead
November 2019 general election	10 Nov 2019	—N/a	70.1	33.1; 9	26.9; 7	6.8; 0	21.9; 5	9.2; 0	6.2
GAD3/RTVE–FORTA	25 Oct–10 Nov 2019	?	?	? 8	? 7	? 0	? 6	? 0	?
CIS	21 Sep–13 Oct 2019	1,460	?	? 10/13	? 7	? 0/2	? 1/2	? 0	?
2019 EP election	26 May 2019	—N/a	68.7	40.5 (12)	27.6 (7)	12.2 (2)	8.2 (0)	7.6 (0)	12.9
April 2019 general election	28 Apr 2019	—N/a	76.6	32.4; 9	22.7; 6	17.5; 4	15.3; 2	10.2; 0	9.7

=== Catalonia ===
Color key:

Poll conducted after legal ban on opinion polls

Polling firm/Commissioner	Fieldwork date	Sample size	Turnout	ERC–Sobiranistes	PSC	ECP	JxCat	Cs	PP	Vox	FR	Más País	CUP	Lead
November 2019 general election	10 Nov 2019	—N/a	69.4	22.6; 13	20.5; 12	14.2; 7	13.7; 8	5.6; 2	7.4; 2	6.3; 2	–	1.1; 0	6.4; 2	2.1
GAD3/TV3	25 Oct–10 Nov 2019	?	?	23.0; 13/14	23.0; 12/13	13.0; 5/7	10.0; 6/7	6.0; 2	6.0; 2	6.0; 2	–	? 0	8.0; 3/4	Tie
GESOP/El Periódico	28–31 Oct 2019	657	?	23.2; 14/15	20.8; 11/12	13.6; 6/7	9.8; 5/6	5.9; 1/2	6.4; 2	6.2; 2	–	? 0	9.6; 4/5	2.4
GAD3/Vocento	14–31 Oct 2019	?	?	? 13/14	? 12	? 6	? 5	? 2	? 2	? 2	–	? 0	? 4	?
Sigma Dos/Antena 3	27 Oct 2019	?	?	? 14/17	? 12/13	? 6/8	? 4/5	? 2	? 2/3	? 1/2	–	? 0	? 3/4	?
GESOP/El Periódico	21–25 Oct 2019	1,444	?	23.7; 14/15	20.5; 11/12	13.5; 6	10.5; 6/7	6.0; 2	6.0; 2	5.8; 2	–	? 0	8.9; 4	3.2
NC Report/La Razón	9–18 Oct 2019	?	?	25.1; 15/16	20.6; 11/12	12.7; 7	9.6; 6	7.0; 3	6.6; 2	3.8; 1	–	3.3; 1	3.9; 1	4.5
CIS	21 Sep–13 Oct 2019	1,759	?	? 16/18	? 13/14	? 8/9	? 4/6	? 2	? 1	? 0	–	? 0	? 1/2	?
SocioMétrica/El Español	9–12 Oct 2019	?	?	? 13	? 12	? 6	? 7	? 2	? 2	? 1	–	? 1	? 4	?
GAD3/La Vanguardia	16–20 Sep 2019	403	?	22.4; 13	26.7; 15	14.5; 7	11.2; 7	10.0; 3	6.1; 2	3.6; 1	–	–	–	4.3
GESOP/CEO	25 Jun–17 Jul 2019	1,500	65	25.4; 14/16	25.7; 13/14	16.2; 8	10.9; 6/7	8.7; 3	5.0; 1/2	3.0; 0/1	2.5; 0/1	–	–	0.3
2019 EP election	26 May 2019	—N/a	64.2	21.2 (11)	22.1 (12)	8.4 (3)	28.5 (17)	8.6 (3)	5.2 (2)	2.0 (0)	–	–	–	6.4
April 2019 general election	28 Apr 2019	—N/a	74.6	24.6; 15	23.2; 12	14.8; 7	12.1; 7	11.6; 5	4.8; 1	3.6; 1	2.7; 0	–	–	1.4

=== Extremadura ===
Color key:

Poll conducted after legal ban on opinion polls

Polling firm/Commissioner	Fieldwork date	Sample size	Turnout	PSOE	PP	Cs	Vox	Unidas Podemos	Lead
November 2019 general election	10 Nov 2019	—N/a	67.2	38.3; 5	26.0; 3	7.6; 0	16.8; 2	9.1; 0	12.3
GAD3/RTVE–FORTA	25 Oct–10 Nov 2019	?	?	? 5	? 3	? 0	? 2	? 0	?
GAD3/Vocento	14–31 Oct 2019	?	?	37.0; 5	27.0; 3	9.0; 0	16.0; 2	8.0; 0	10.0
CIS	21 Sep–13 Oct 2019	600	?	? 6/7	? 2/3	? 1	? 0	? 0	?
2019 EP election	26 May 2019	—N/a	68.1	46.0 (7)	25.7 (3)	11.3 (0)	5.6 (0)	6.8 (0)	20.3
April 2019 general election	28 Apr 2019	—N/a	74.2	38.1; 5	21.4; 2	18.0; 2	10.8; 1	9.5; 0	16.7

=== Galicia ===
Color key:

Poll conducted after legal ban on opinion polls

Polling firm/Commissioner	Fieldwork date	Sample size	Turnout	PSdeG–PSOE	PP	EC	Cs	BNG	Vox	Más País–Equo	Lead
November 2019 general election	10 Nov 2019	—N/a	55.9	31.3; 10	31.9; 10	12.7; 2	4.4; 0	8.1; 1	7.8; 0	1.5; 0	0.6
Sondaxe/La Voz de Galicia	7–10 Nov 2019	1,200	?	31.1; 10	30.3; 10	13.8; 2	6.0; 0	6.2; 0	7.5; 1	? 0	0.8
GAD3/CRTVG	25 Oct–10 Nov 2019	?	?	30.0; 10	32.0; 10	12.0; 2	? 0	8.0; 0/1	8.0; 0/1	? 0	2.0
Sondaxe/La Voz de Galicia	30 Oct–3 Nov 2019	1,200	?	30.6; 10	28.9; 9	15.1; 3	5.3; 0	8.4; 1	7.1; 0	2.3; 0	1.7
Infortécnica	2 Nov 2019	?	?	? 10/11	? 9/11	? 0/2	? 0/2	? 0	? 0/2	? 0	?
Sondaxe/La Voz de Galicia	29 Oct–2 Nov 2019	1,200	?	30.3; 10	28.6; 9	15.6; 3	5.6; 0	7.7; 1	7.1; 0	2.6; 0	1.7
Sondaxe/La Voz de Galicia	28 Oct–1 Nov 2019	1,200	?	29.4; 9	29.2; 10	16.4; 3	6.2; 0	6.7; 1	7.7; 0	1.7; 0	0.2
GAD3/Vocento	14–31 Oct 2019	?	?	? 10	? 10	? 2	? 0	? 1	? 0	? 0	Tie
Sondaxe/La Voz de Galicia	27–30 Oct 2019	1,200	?	28.7; 10	29.5; 10	15.6; 2	6.0; 0	7.3; 1	7.3; 0	1.7; 0	0.8
DYM/Prensa Ibérica	25–30 Oct 2019	?	?	29.9; 10	28.9; 9	11.9; 2	6.9; 0	10.2; 1/2	8.2; 0/1	–	1.0
Sondaxe/La Voz de Galicia	26–29 Oct 2019	1,200	?	27.9; 9	30.0; 10	16.6; 3	5.8; 0	7.7; 1	7.2; 0	1.8; 0	2.1
Sondaxe/La Voz de Galicia	25–28 Oct 2019	1,200	?	27.7; 9	30.9; 10	16.4; 3	5.7; 0	7.9; 1	5.9; 0	1.5; 0	3.2
Sondaxe/La Voz de Galicia	24–27 Oct 2019	1,200	?	28.9; 10	30.6; 10	15.1; 2	6.4; 0	8.0; 1	5.6; 0	1.3; 0	1.7
Sondaxe/La Voz de Galicia	23–26 Oct 2019	1,200	?	30.3; 10	31.2; 10	13.9; 2	5.1; 0	7.4; 1	5.9; 0	1.8; 0	0.9
Sondaxe/La Voz de Galicia	22–25 Oct 2019	1,200	?	30.9; 10	31.3; 10	14.5; 2	5.3; 0	7.1; 1	6.9; 0	0.7; 0	0.4
CIS	21 Sep–13 Oct 2019	1,286	?	? 10/11	? 9	? 2/3	? 1	? 0	? 0	? 0	?
Sondaxe/La Voz de Galicia	26 Sep–3 Oct 2019	1,223	67.2	26.4; 8	31.3; 10	10.8; 2	5.1; 0	6.5; 1	4.9; 0	10.5; 2	4.9
2019 EP election	26 May 2019	—N/a	54.5	35.1 (11)	29.8 (9)	8.1 (1)	6.7 (0)	11.8 (2)	2.6 (0)	–	5.3
April 2019 general election	28 Apr 2019	—N/a	61.9	32.1; 10	27.4; 9	14.5; 2	11.2; 2	5.7; 0	5.3; 0	–	4.7

=== La Rioja ===
Color key:

Poll conducted after legal ban on opinion polls

Polling firm/Commissioner	Fieldwork date	Sample size	Turnout	PSOE	PP	Cs	Unidas Podemos	Vox	Lead
November 2019 general election	10 Nov 2019	—N/a	67.0	34.9; 2	34.2; 2	7.1; 0	9.9; 0	11.5; 0	0.7
GAD3/RTVE–FORTA	25 Oct–10 Nov 2019	?	?	? 2	? 2	? 0	? 0	? 0	?
GAD3/Vocento	14–31 Oct 2019	200	?	30.0; 2	33.0; 2	9.0; 0	9.0; 0	13.0; 0	3.0
CIS	21 Sep–13 Oct 2019	284	?	? 2	? 2	? 0	? 0	? 0	Tie
2019 EP election	26 May 2019	—N/a	64.6	37.4 (2)	31.1 (2)	13.3 (0)	8.4 (0)	5.2 (0)	6.3
April 2019 general election	28 Apr 2019	—N/a	73.4	31.7; 2	26.5; 1	17.8; 1	11.8; 0	9.0; 0	5.2

=== Madrid ===
Color key:

Poll conducted after legal ban on opinion polls

Polling firm/Commissioner	Fieldwork date	Sample size	Turnout	PSOE	Cs	PP	Unidas Podemos	Vox	Más País–Equo	Lead
November 2019 general election	10 Nov 2019	—N/a	70.6	26.9; 10	9.1; 3	24.9; 10	13.0; 5	18.3; 7	5.7; 2	2.0
GAD3/RTVE–FORTA	25 Oct–10 Nov 2019	?	?	24.0; 9	11.0; 4	22.0; 9	14.0; 5	22.0; 8	5.0; 2	2.0
GAD3/Vocento	14–31 Oct 2019	?	?	? 10	? 4	? 10	? 4	? 7	? 2	Tie
Sigma Dos/Antena 3	27 Oct 2019	?	?	? 10/11	? 4	? 8/9	? 5	? 6/7	? 2	?
CIS	21 Sep–13 Oct 2019	723	?	? 11/12	? 5/6	? 8/9	? 5/6	? 4/5	? 2	?
GAD3/ABC	30 Sep–11 Oct 2019	1,145	?	27.1; 10	10.1; 4	25.4; 10	12.6; 5	16.9; 6	5.1; 2	1.7
Llorente & Cuenca	23–26 Sep 2019	315	69.0	28.1; 11	15.1; 6	24.6; 9	12.8; 5	8.8; 3	8.5; 3	3.5
2019 EP election	26 May 2019	—N/a	63.6	32.3 (13)	18.3 (7)	22.2 (8)	12.8 (5)	9.9 (4)	–	10.1
April 2019 general election	28 Apr 2019	—N/a	75.5	27.3; 11	20.9; 8	18.6; 7	16.2; 6	13.9; 5	–	6.4

=== Murcia ===
Color key:

Poll conducted after legal ban on opinion polls

Polling firm/Commissioner	Fieldwork date	Sample size	Turnout	PSOE	PP	Cs	Vox	Unidas Podemos	Más País–Equo	Lead
November 2019 general election	10 Nov 2019	—N/a	68.0	24.8; 3	26.5; 3	7.4; 0	28.0; 3	8.9; 1	1.9; 0	1.5
GAD3/RTVE–FORTA	25 Oct–10 Nov 2019	?	?	22.0; 2	27.0; 3	10.0; 1	28.0; 3	8.0; 1	–	1.0
CEMOP	28–31 Oct 2019	820	71.8	27.8; 3	26.4; 3	9.8; 1	22.2; 2	8.2; 1	3.0; 0	1.4
GAD3/Vocento	14–31 Oct 2019	600	?	23.0; 2/3	29.0; 3	10.0; 1	26.0; 3	8.0; 0/1	<5.0; 0	3.0
CIS	21 Sep–13 Oct 2019	482	?	? 3	? 3	? 1	? 2	? 1	? 0	Tie
2019 EP election	26 May 2019	—N/a	60.8	31.9 (4)	30.5 (3)	14.0 (1)	11.1 (1)	8.0 (1)	–	1.4
April 2019 general election	28 Apr 2019	—N/a	73.5	24.8; 3	23.4; 2	19.5; 2	18.6; 2	10.4; 1	–	1.4

=== Navarre ===
Color key:

Poll conducted after legal ban on opinion polls

Polling firm/Commissioner	Fieldwork date	Sample size	Turnout	NA+	PSOE	Unidas Podemos	EH Bildu	GBai	Vox	PP	Cs	Lead
November 2019 general election	10 Nov 2019	—N/a	65.9	29.6; 2	25.0; 1	16.6; 1	16.9; 1	3.8; 0	5.8; 0	(Note: Within NA+.)		4.6
GAD3/RTVE–FORTA	25 Oct–10 Nov 2019	?	?	30.0; 2	25.0; 2	16.0; 1	12.0; 0	–	8.0; 0			5.0
GAD3/Vocento	14–31 Oct 2019	?	?	? 2	? 2	? 1	? 0	? 0	? 0			Tie
Gizaker/EITB	28–30 Oct 2019	400	71.0	28.5; 2	25.3; 1	18.0; 1	14.0; 1	6.3; 0	5.6; 0			3.2
CIS	21 Sep–13 Oct 2019	288	?	? 2	? 1	? 1	? 1	? 0	? 0			?
2019 EP election	26 May 2019	—N/a	66.9	–	28.0 (2)	11.7 (1)	16.0 (1)	8.0 (0)	4.2 (0)	18.8 (1)	7.4 (0)	9.2
April 2019 general election	28 Apr 2019	—N/a	72.5	29.3; 2	25.8; 2	18.6; 1	12.7; 0	6.1; 0	4.8; 0			3.4

=== Valencian Community ===
Color key:

Poll conducted after legal ban on opinion polls

Polling firm/Commissioner	Fieldwork date	Sample size	Turnout	PSOE	PP	Cs	Unidas Podemos	Vox	MC	Lead
November 2019 general election	10 Nov 2019	—N/a	69.8	27.6; 10	23.0; 8	7.7; 2	13.4; 4	18.5; 7	7.0; 1	4.6
GAD3/RTVE–FORTA	25 Oct–10 Nov 2019	?	?	? 10/11	? 7/9	? 2	? 3/4	? 7	? 1	?
SyM Consulting/EPDA	31 Oct–2 Nov 2019	1,454	68.4	23.5; 8/10	24.5; 9/10	10.0; 3	14.6; 3/6	12.5; 4	10.7; 2	1.0
GAD3/Vocento	14–31 Oct 2019	1,000	?	27.0; 10/11	24.0; 9/10	9.0; 2	11.0; 3	17.0; 6	7.0; 1	3.0
CIS	21 Sep–13 Oct 2019	1,318	?	? 10/12	? 7/8	? 4	? 4/6	? 2/3	? 1/2	?
Invest Group/Levante-EMV	23 Sep–1 Oct 2019	900	?	32.7; 12	22.4; 8	8.6; 2	9.1; 3	12.1; 3/4	11.4; 3/4	10.3
2019 EP election	26 May 2019	—N/a	62.5	33.0 (13)	22.6 (8)	14.3 (5)	9.7 (2)	7.2 (2)	8.4 (2)	10.4
April 2019 general election	28 Apr 2019	—N/a	74.3	27.8; 10	18.6; 7	18.0; 6	14.2; 5	12.0; 3	6.5; 1	9.2

== Constituencies ==
=== A Coruña ===
Color key:

Poll conducted after legal ban on opinion polls

Polling firm/Commissioner	Fieldwork date	Sample size	Turnout	PSdeG–PSOE	PP	EC	Cs	BNG	Vox	Más País–Equo	Lead
November 2019 general election	10 Nov 2019	—N/a	57.0	30.0; 3	30.5; 3	12.6; 1	4.6; 0	9.5; 1	8.2; 0	2.0; 0	0.5
GAD3/CRTVG	25 Oct–10 Nov 2019	?	?	27.2; 3	28.3; 3	9.7; 1	? 0	7.9; 0/1	8.2; 0/1	? 0	1.1
Infortécnica	2 Nov 2019	?	?	? 3/4	? 3/4	? 0/1	? 0/1	? 0	? 0/1	? 0	Tie
GAD3/Vocento	14–31 Oct 2019	?	?	? 3	? 3	? 1	? 0	? 1	? 0	? 0	Tie
DYM/Prensa Ibérica	25–30 Oct 2019	?	?	? 3	? 3	? 1	? 0	? 0/1	? 0/1	? 0	Tie
CIS	21 Sep–13 Oct 2019	343	?	? 3/4	? 3	? 1/2	? 0	? 0	? 0	? 0	?
Sondaxe/La Voz de Galicia	26 Sep–3 Oct 2019	?	?	23.2; 2	28.3; 3	9.7; 1	5.6; 0	7.9; 1	? 0	15.5; 1	5.1
2019 EP election	26 May 2019	—N/a	54.7	34.2; 4	28.8; 3	8.2; 0	7.0; 0	13.0; 1	2.8; 0	–	5.4
April 2019 general election	28 Apr 2019	—N/a	63.1	31.4; 3	25.5; 3	14.8; 1	12.1; 1	6.7; 0	5.6; 0	–	5.9

=== Álava ===
Polling firm/Commissioner	Fieldwork date	Sample size	Turnout	PNV	PSE–EE	Unidas Podemos	EH Bildu	PP	Cs	Vox	Lead
November 2019 general election	10 Nov 2019	—N/a	66.6	23.6; 1	21.9; 1	16.5; 1	16.1; 1	14.9; 0	1.5; 0	3.8; 0	1.7
GAD3/Vocento	14–31 Oct 2019	?	?	22.7; 1	22.2; 1	14.4; 0/1	12.2; 0/1	17.9; 1	2.1; 0	4.7; 0	0.5
Gizaker/EITB	28–30 Oct 2019	400	?	25.6; 1	21.6; 1	15.0; 0/1	16.4; 1	14.9; 0/1	2.6; 0	2.6; 0	4.0
CIS	21 Sep–13 Oct 2019	242	?	? 1	? 1	? 1	? 1	? 0	? 0	? 0	Tie
Ikertalde/GPS	1–9 Oct 2019	490	65.0	25.1; 1	21.1; 1	15.4; 1	14.8; 1	14.7; 0	2.9; 0	3.6; 0	4.0
Gizaker/EITB	20–23 Sep 2019	400	?	23.5; 1	24.3; 1	15.1; 1	13.0; 0	16.3; 1	3.1; 0	2.8; 0	0.8
2019 EP election	26 May 2019	—N/a	62.8	25.3; 2	22.1; 1	11.8; 0	17.9; 1	12.5; 0	3.7; 0	2.1; 0	3.2
April 2019 general election	28 Apr 2019	—N/a	69.5	22.7; 1	22.4; 1	17.7; 1	14.0; 1	13.7; 0	4.0; 0	3.2; 0	0.3

=== Alicante ===
Polling firm/Commissioner	Fieldwork date	Sample size	Turnout	PSOE	PP	Cs	Unidas Podemos	Vox	MC	Lead
November 2019 general election	10 Nov 2019	—N/a	67.4	28.2; 4	24.3; 3	8.1; 1	12.7; 1	19.7; 3	4.2; 0	3.9
SyM Consulting/EPDA	31 Oct–2 Nov 2019	?	?	27.7; 4	30.6; 4/5	9.3; 1	12.4; 1/2	9.9; 1	4.5; 0	2.9
GAD3/Vocento	14–31 Oct 2019	?	?	? 4	? 4	? 1	? 1	? 2	? 0	?
CIS	21 Sep–13 Oct 2019	492	?	? 4/5	? 3	? 2	? 1/2	? 1	? 0	?
2019 EP election	26 May 2019	—N/a	60.3	33.7; 5	24.6; 3	15.2; 2	9.3; 1	7.2; 1	4.8; 0	9.1
April 2019 general election	28 Apr 2019	—N/a	72.9	28.3; 4	19.5; 3	19.4; 2	13.9; 2	12.6; 1	3.4; 0	8.8

=== Almería ===
Polling firm/Commissioner	Fieldwork date	Sample size	Turnout	PSOE	PP	Vox	Cs	Unidas Podemos	Lead
November 2019 general election	10 Nov 2019	—N/a	60.8	29.5; 2	25.8; 2	26.7; 2	7.6; 0	8.1; 0	2.8
GAD3/Vocento	14–31 Oct 2019	?	?	28.0; 2	27.0; 2	26.0; 2	8.0; 0	7.0; 0	1.0
CIS	21 Sep–13 Oct 2019	299	?	? 2/3	? 1	? 1	? 1	? 0/1	?
2019 EP election	26 May 2019	—N/a	61.4	35.5; 3	30.7; 2	11.2; 0	12.2; 1	6.7; 0	4.8
April 2019 general election	28 Apr 2019	—N/a	66.1	30.2; 2	22.5; 2	19.1; 1	17.1; 1	8.8; 0	7.7

=== Badajoz ===
Polling firm/Commissioner	Fieldwork date	Sample size	Turnout	PSOE	PP	Cs	Vox	Unidas Podemos	Lead
November 2019 general election	10 Nov 2019	—N/a	67.9	38.5; 3	25.1; 2	8.0; 0	17.3; 1	9.2; 0	13.4
GAD3/Vocento	14–31 Oct 2019	?	?	37.0; 3	26.0; 2	9.0; 0	16.0; 1	7.0; 0	11.0
CIS	21 Sep–13 Oct 2019	300	?	? 3/4	? 1/2	? 1	? 0	? 0	?
2019 EP election	26 May 2019	—N/a	68.9	47.4; 4	24.6; 2	11.6; 0	5.6; 0	6.6; 0	22.8
April 2019 general election	28 Apr 2019	—N/a	74.7	38.5; 3	20.4; 1	18.5; 1	11.0; 1	9.4; 0	18.1

=== Biscay ===
Polling firm/Commissioner	Fieldwork date	Sample size	Turnout	PNV	PSE–EE	Unidas Podemos	EH Bildu	PP	Cs	Vox	Más País	Lead
November 2019 general election	10 Nov 2019	—N/a	66.8	35.2; 3	19.1; 2	15.4; 1	15.0; 1	8.8; 1	1.1; 0	2.4; 0	1.4; 0	16.1
GAD3/Vocento	14–31 Oct 2019	?	?	35.0; 3	20.1; 2	14.7; 1	12.0; 1	9.7; 1	1.7; 0	3.5; 0	1.0; 0	14.9
Gizaker/EITB	28–30 Oct 2019	400	?	35.2; 4	19.7; 2	15.5; 1	14.6; 1	7.0; 0	2.3; 0	2.5; 0	2.1; 0	15.5
CIS	21 Sep–13 Oct 2019	332	?	? 3/4	? 2/3	? 1	? 1	? 0	? 0	? 0	? 0	?
Ikertalde/GPS	1–9 Oct 2019	1,022	67.5	35.0; 4	19.3; 2	15.7; 1	13.8; 1	7.5; 0	2.0; 0	2.9; 0	1.8; 0	15.7
Gizaker/EITB	20–23 Sep 2019	400	?	33.8; 3/4	22.1; 2	15.8; 1	13.9; 1	8.7; 0/1	3.0; 0	1.8; 0	–	11.7
2019 EP election	26 May 2019	—N/a	62.7	38.3; 4	18.6; 2	11.4; 1	18.3; 1	6.1; 0	2.7; 0	1.2; 0	–	19.7
April 2019 general election	28 Apr 2019	—N/a	72.9	34.3; 3	19.9; 2	17.7; 2	13.4; 1	7.3; 0	3.1; 0	2.3; 0	–	14.4

=== Burgos ===
Polling firm/Commissioner	Fieldwork date	Sample size	Turnout	PSOE	PP	Cs	Unidas Podemos	Vox	Lead
November 2019 general election	10 Nov 2019	—N/a	67.5	32.3; 2	30.8; 2	8.2; 0	11.1; 0	14.9; 0	1.5
GAD3/Vocento	14–31 Oct 2019	?	?	28.0; 1	31.0; 2	10.0; 0	10.0; 0	16.0; 1	3.0
CIS	21 Sep–13 Oct 2019	299	?	? 2	? 2	? 0	? 0	? 0	Tie
2019 EP election	26 May 2019	—N/a	68.2	34.7; 2	27.2; 1	16.2; 1	9.3; 0	6.9; 0	7.5
April 2019 general election	28 Apr 2019	—N/a	74.4	29.3; 2	24.6; 1	19.8; 1	12.5; 0	11.1; 0	4.7

=== Cáceres ===
Polling firm/Commissioner	Fieldwork date	Sample size	Turnout	PSOE	PP	Cs	Vox	Unidas Podemos	Lead
November 2019 general election	10 Nov 2019	—N/a	66.1	38.1; 2	27.6; 1	7.0; 1	16.0; 1	9.0; 0	10.5
GAD3/Vocento	14–31 Oct 2019	?	?	36.0; 2	29.0; 1	9.0; 0	15.0; 1	8.0; 0	7.0
CIS	21 Sep–13 Oct 2019	300	?	? 3	? 1	? 0	? 0	? 0	?
2019 EP election	26 May 2019	—N/a	72.0	43.9; 3	27.6; 1	10.7; 0	5.8; 0	6.9; 0	15.3
April 2019 general election	28 Apr 2019	—N/a	73.3	37.4; 2	23.0; 1	17.1; 1	10.4; 0	9.8; 0	14.4

=== Cádiz ===
Polling firm/Commissioner	Fieldwork date	Sample size	Turnout	PSOE	Cs	Unidas Podemos	PP	Vox	Más País	Lead
November 2019 general election	10 Nov 2019	—N/a	62.3	30.6; 3	9.0; 1	15.2; 1	18.0; 2	21.3; 2	1.8; 0	9.3
GAD3/Vocento	14–31 Oct 2019	?	?	31.0; 3	10.0; 1	13.0; 1	19.0; 2	19.0; 2	? 0	12.0
CIS	21 Sep–13 Oct 2019	398	?	? 3/4	? 1	? 1/2	? 1/2	? 1	? 0	?
2019 EP election	26 May 2019	—N/a	54.8	37.8; 5	14.5; 1	14.1; 1	19.1; 2	7.4; 0	–	11.8
April 2019 general election	28 Apr 2019	—N/a	67.6	31.5; 3	19.7; 2	16.6; 2	14.9; 1	13.1; 1	–	11.8

=== Castellón ===
Polling firm/Commissioner	Fieldwork date	Sample size	Turnout	PSOE	PP	Cs	Unidas Podemos	Vox	MC	Lead
November 2019 general election	10 Nov 2019	—N/a	70.7	28.6; 2	23.8; 1	6.9; 0	13.3; 1	18.6; 1	6.2; 0	4.8
SyM Consulting/EPDA	31 Oct–2 Nov 2019	?	?	23.9; 1/2	16.4; 1	13.8; 1	13.0; 0/1	19.4; 1	10.1; 0	4.5
GAD3/Vocento	14–31 Oct 2019	?	?	? 2	? 2	? 0	? 0	? 1	? 0	?
CIS	21 Sep–13 Oct 2019	294	?	? 2	? 2	? 0	? 1	? 0	? 0	Tie
2019 EP election	26 May 2019	—N/a	66.4	34.3; 2	24.4; 2	12.7; 1	8.9; 0	7.2; 0	7.1; 0	9.9
April 2019 general election	28 Apr 2019	—N/a	75.6	29.5; 2	20.3; 1	16.3; 1	13.9; 1	12.0; 0	5.3; 0	9.2

=== Córdoba ===
Polling firm/Commissioner	Fieldwork date	Sample size	Turnout	PSOE	PP	Cs	Unidas Podemos	Vox	Lead
November 2019 general election	10 Nov 2019	—N/a	69.7	33.0; 2	22.5; 2	8.2; 0	14.6; 1	18.6; 1	10.5
GAD3/Vocento	14–31 Oct 2019	?	?	33.0; 2	24.0; 2	9.0; 0	12.0; 1	17.0; 1	9.0
CIS	21 Sep–13 Oct 2019	352	?	? 3	? 1	? 0/1	? 1	? 0/1	?
2019 EP election	26 May 2019	—N/a	63.9	39.8; 3	23.8; 1	12.7; 1	12.9; 1	6.5; 0	16.0
April 2019 general election	28 Apr 2019	—N/a	74.1	34.4; 2	18.8; 1	16.9; 1	14.9; 1	12.0; 1	15.6

=== Gipuzkoa ===
Polling firm/Commissioner	Fieldwork date	Sample size	Turnout	PNV	EH Bildu	PSE–EE	Unidas Podemos	PP	Cs	Vox	Lead
November 2019 general election	10 Nov 2019	—N/a	65.8	30.5; 2	25.8; 2	18.1; 1	15.0; 1	6.2; 0	1.0; 0	1.9; 0	4.7
GAD3/Vocento	14–31 Oct 2019	?	?	30.0; 2	21.4; 2	19.5; 1	14.7; 1	6.9; 0	1.6; 0	2.5; 0	8.6
Gizaker/EITB	28–30 Oct 2019	400	?	31.3; 2	25.5; 2	18.8; 1	14.0; 1	5.9; 0	2.5; 0	1.2; 0	5.8
CIS	21 Sep–13 Oct 2019	287	?	? 2	? 2	? 1	? 1	? 0	? 0	? 0	Tie
Ikertalde/GPS	1–9 Oct 2019	658	64.5	29.5; 2	23.8; 2	18.3; 1	16.0; 1	6.4; 0	1.5; 0	2.3; 0	5.7
Gizaker/EITB	20–23 Sep 2019	400	?	27.9; 2	22.4; 2	21.5; 1	15.0; 1	7.8; 0	2.5; 0	1.1; 0	5.5
2019 EP election	26 May 2019	—N/a	63.2	30.7; 3	29.8; 2	18.2; 1	10.2; 0	4.3; 0	2.3; 0	0.9; 0	0.9
April 2019 general election	28 Apr 2019	—N/a	71.0	29.0; 2	23.4; 2	18.9; 1	17.3; 1	5.0; 0	2.9; 0	1.6; 0	5.6

=== Granada ===
Polling firm/Commissioner	Fieldwork date	Sample size	Turnout	PSOE	PP	Cs	Vox	Unidas Podemos	Más País	Lead
November 2019 general election	10 Nov 2019	—N/a	65.0	33.2; 3	21.8; 2	7.8; 0	20.7; 1	12.3; 1	1.8; 0	11.4
GAD3/Vocento	14–31 Oct 2019	?	?	32.6; 3	23.4; 2	8.8; 0	20.3; 1	10.8; 1	? 0	9.2
CIS	21 Sep–13 Oct 2019	398	?	? 3	? 1	? 1	? 1	? 1	? 0	?
2019 EP election	26 May 2019	—N/a	63.9	39.9; 3	22.9; 2	13.3; 1	8.2; 0	10.8; 1	–	17.0
April 2019 general election	28 Apr 2019	—N/a	70.6	33.9; 3	18.4; 1	17.4; 1	14.1; 1	13.6; 1	–	15.5

=== Huelva ===
Polling firm/Commissioner	Fieldwork date	Sample size	Turnout	PSOE	PP	Cs	Unidas Podemos	Vox	Lead
November 2019 general election	10 Nov 2019	—N/a	64.0	36.6; 3	19.7; 1	7.3; 0	12.1; 0	20.9; 1	15.7
GAD3/Vocento	14–31 Oct 2019	?	?	36.0; 3	22.0; 1	9.0; 0	10.0; 0	19.0; 1	14.0
CIS	21 Sep–13 Oct 2019	300	?	? 3	? 1	? 1	? 0	? 0	?
2019 EP election	26 May 2019	—N/a	60.6	45.9; 4	22.0; 1	11.4; 0	9.2; 0	6.3; 0	23.9
April 2019 general election	28 Apr 2019	—N/a	67.7	37.0; 2	17.0; 1	16.9; 1	13.0; 1	12.8; 0	20.0

=== Huesca ===
Polling firm/Commissioner	Fieldwork date	Sample size	Turnout	PSOE	PP	Cs	Unidas Podemos	Vox	CHA	Lead
November 2019 general election	10 Nov 2019	—N/a	66.5	33.5; 2	26.2; 1	8.1; 0	12.4; 0	15.2; 0	1.8; 0	7.3
A+M/El Heraldo de Aragón	28–31 Oct 2019	?	67.5	33.7; 2	26.9; 1	10.6; 0	12.0; 0	11.1; 0	2.2; 0	6.8
GAD3/Vocento	14–31 Oct 2019	?	?	? 2	? 1	? 0	? 0	? 0	? 0	?
A+M/El Heraldo de Aragón	8–15 Oct 2019	?	61.9	28.6; 1/2	23.2; 1	14.3; 0/1	10.6; 0	12.4; 0	7.5; 0	5.4
CIS	21 Sep–13 Oct 2019	300	?	? 2	? 1	? 0	? 0	? 0	? 0	?
2019 EP election	26 May 2019	—N/a	67.2	38.3; 2	22.8; 1	15.1; 0	9.8; 0	6.8; 0	1.7; 0	14.5
April 2019 general election	28 Apr 2019	—N/a	73.4	33.0; 1	20.1; 1	19.6; 1	13.7; 0	10.7; 0	–	12.9

=== Jaén ===
Polling firm/Commissioner	Fieldwork date	Sample size	Turnout	PSOE	PP	Cs	Vox	Unidas Podemos	Lead
November 2019 general election	10 Nov 2019	—N/a	70.5	38.8; 3	22.5; 1	6.8; 0	19.7; 1	9.9; 0	16.3
GAD3/Vocento	14–31 Oct 2019	?	?	38.0; 3	25.0; 1	8.0; 0	17.0; 1	8.0; 0	13.0
CIS	21 Sep–13 Oct 2019	300	?	? 3	? 1	? 1	? 0	? 0	?
2019 EP election	26 May 2019	—N/a	68.3	46.1; 2	23.7; 1	11.8; 1	6.3; 0	8.5; 0	22.3
April 2019 general election	28 Apr 2019	—N/a	74.4	39.5; 3	19.6; 1	15.9; 1	12.1; 0	10.6; 0	19.9

=== Las Palmas ===
Polling firm/Commissioner	Fieldwork date	Sample size	Turnout	PSOE	Unidas Podemos	PP	Cs	Vox	NCa	CC–NCa	Más País–Equo	Lead
November 2019 general election	10 Nov 2019	—N/a	56.1	29.2; 3	15.4; 1	21.4; 2	5.8; 0	13.3; 1		9.9; 1	1.7; 0	7.8
Perfiles	2 Nov 2019	600	?	31.0– 32.0; 3/4	15.0– 16.0; 1/2	17.0– 18.0; 2	7.0– 8.0; 0/1	7.0– 8.0; 0/1		9.0– 10.0; 1	? 0	14.0
GAD3/Vocento	14–31 Oct 2019	?	?	30.0; 3	14.0; 1	22.0; 2	9.0; 1	11.0; 1		8.0; 0	? 0	8.0
CIS	21 Sep–13 Oct 2019	334	?	? 3	? 1	? 2	? 1	? 0/1	? 0	? 0	? 0	?
Hamalgama Métrica/La Provincia	3–16 Sep 2019	800	58–60	29.9	16.8	20.4	11.1	5.8	8.9	4.8	–	9.5
2019 EP election	26 May 2019	—N/a	51.3	32.5; 4	10.7; 1	15.8; 1	8.4; 0	3.6; 0	7.8; 0	15.2; 1	–	16.7
April 2019 general election	28 Apr 2019	—N/a	63.6	28.3; 3	16.7; 2	16.2; 2	15.4; 1	7.0; 0	6.6; 0	6.4; 0	–	11.6

=== León ===
Polling firm/Commissioner	Fieldwork date	Sample size	Turnout	PSOE	PP	Cs	Unidas Podemos	Vox	Lead
November 2019 general election	10 Nov 2019	—N/a	61.5	33.5; 2	28.4; 1	6.4; 0	10.5; 0	15.6; 1	5.1
GAD3/Vocento	14–31 Oct 2019	?	?	31.0; 2	30.0; 1	9.0; 0	9.0; 0	17.0; 1	1.0
CIS	21 Sep–13 Oct 2019	298	?	? 2	? 2	? 0	? 0	? 0	Tie
2019 EP election	26 May 2019	—N/a	65.7	39.3; 2	27.3; 2	13.4; 0	8.9; 0	6.5; 0	12.0
April 2019 general election	28 Apr 2019	—N/a	68.2	32.8; 2	23.5; 1	17.5; 1	12.0; 0	11.5; 0	9.3

=== Lugo ===
Color key:

Poll conducted after legal ban on opinion polls

Polling firm/Commissioner	Fieldwork date	Sample size	Turnout	PP	PSdeG–PSOE	EC	Cs	Vox	BNG	Lead
November 2019 general election	10 Nov 2019	—N/a	53.2	38.0; 2	31.9; 2	9.2; 0	3.2; 0	8.1; 0	7.2; 0	6.1
GAD3/CRTVG	25 Oct–10 Nov 2019	?	?	44.6; 2	41.1; 2	? 0	? 0	? 0	? 0	3.5
Infortécnica	2 Nov 2019	?	?	? 2	? 2	? 0	? 0	? 0	? 0	Tie
GAD3/Vocento	14–31 Oct 2019	?	?	? 2	? 2	? 0	? 0	? 0	? 0	Tie
DYM/Prensa Ibérica	25–30 Oct 2019	?	?	? 2	? 2	? 0	? 0	? 0	? 0	Tie
CIS	21 Sep–13 Oct 2019	300	?	? 2	? 2	? 0	? 0	? 0	? 0	Tie
Sondaxe/La Voz de Galicia	26 Sep–3 Oct 2019	?	?	44.6; 2	28.1; 2	? 0	2.0; 0	8.0; 0	? 0	16.5
2019 EP election	26 May 2019	—N/a	54.8	35.3; 2	34.8; 2	5.9; 0	5.2; 0	2.7; 0	10.3; 0	0.5
April 2019 general election	28 Apr 2019	—N/a	59.1	33.6; 2	33.2; 2	10.1; 0	8.9; 0	5.7; 0	4.8; 0	0.4

=== Málaga ===
Polling firm/Commissioner	Fieldwork date	Sample size	Turnout	PSOE	Cs	PP	Unidas Podemos	Vox	Más País	Lead
November 2019 general election	10 Nov 2019	—N/a	64.0	30.0; 4	8.9; 1	21.6; 3	12.9; 1	21.5; 2	1.9; 0	8.4
GAD3/Vocento	14–31 Oct 2019	?	?	30.0; 4	10.0; 1	23.0; 3	12.0; 1	20.0; 2	? 0	7.0
CIS	21 Sep–13 Oct 2019	483	?	? 4	? 2	? 2	? 2	? 1	? 0	?
2019 EP election	26 May 2019	—N/a	55.4	36.6; 5	13.8; 3	25.2; 1	11.4; 1	7.9; 1	–	11.4
2019 general election	28 Apr 2019	—N/a	69.3	30.8; 4	19.5; 2	17.7; 2	14.5; 2	14.0; 1	–	11.3

=== Melilla ===
Color key:

Poll conducted after legal ban on opinion polls

Polling firm/Commissioner	Fieldwork date	Sample size	Turnout	PP	PSOE	CpM	Vox	Cs	Lead
November 2019 general election	10 Nov 2019	—N/a	52.4	29.5; 1	16.5; 0	29.0; 0	18.4; 0	3.0; 0	0.5
GAD3/RTVE–FORTA	25 Oct–10 Nov 2019	?	?	? 1	? 0	? 0	? 0	? 0	?
CIS	21 Sep–13 Oct 2019	60	?	? 1	? 0	? 0	? 0	? 0	?
SyM Consulting	6–8 Sep 2019	642	46.3	27.3; 1	25.7; 0	23.1; 0	11.8; 0	6.0; 0	1.6
2019 EP election	26 May 2019	—N/a	54.8	30.6; 1	23.3; 0	18.5; 0	10.5; 0	8.4; 0	7.3
April 2019 general election	28 Apr 2019	—N/a	57.5	24.0; 1	20.7; 0	20.3; 0	17.2; 0	12.9; 0	3.3

=== Ourense ===
Color key:

Poll conducted after legal ban on opinion polls

Polling firm/Commissioner	Fieldwork date	Sample size	Turnout	PP	PSdeG–PSOE	Cs	EC	Vox	BNG	Lead
November 2019 general election	10 Nov 2019	—N/a	48.2	39.4; 2	33.2; 2	3.7; 0	7.9; 0	7.8; 0	6.0; 0	6.2
GAD3/CRTVG	25 Oct–10 Nov 2019	?	?	36.3; 2	28.9; 2	? 0	? 0	? 0	? 0	7.4
Infortécnica	2 Nov 2019	?	?	? 2	? 2	? 0	? 0	? 0	? 0	Tie
GAD3/Vocento	14–31 Oct 2019	?	?	? 2	? 2	? 0	? 0	? 0	? 0	Tie
DYM/Prensa Ibérica	25–30 Oct 2019	?	?	? 2	? 2	? 0	? 0	? 0	? 0	Tie
CIS	21 Sep–13 Oct 2019	300	?	? 2	? 2	? 0	? 0	? 0	? 0	Tie
Sondaxe/La Voz de Galicia	26 Sep–3 Oct 2019	?	?	36.3; 2	28.9; 2	? 0	2.0; 0	8.0; 0	? 0	7.4
2019 EP election	26 May 2019	—N/a	50.0	35.8; 2	34.5; 2	7.1; 0	5.3; 0	2.6; 0	9.1; 0	1.3
April 2019 general election	28 Apr 2019	—N/a	54.0	34.8; 2	32.9; 2	10.7; 0	8.9; 0	5.2; 0	3.9; 0	1.9

=== Pontevedra ===
Color key:

Poll conducted after legal ban on opinion polls

Polling firm/Commissioner	Fieldwork date	Sample size	Turnout	PSdeG–PSOE	PP	EC	Cs	BNG	Vox	Más País–Equo	Lead
November 2019 general election	10 Nov 2019	—N/a	58.5	31.8; 3	29.1; 3	15.5; 1	4.6; 0	7.5; 0	7.3; 0	2.0; 0	2.7
GAD3/CRTVG	25 Oct–10 Nov 2019	?	?	28.4; 3	28.6; 3	13.7; 1	? 0	? 0	? 0	? 0	0.2
Infortécnica	2 Nov 2019	?	?	? 3	? 2/3	? 0/1	? 0/1	? 0	? 0/1	? 0	?
GAD3/Vocento	14–31 Oct 2019	?	?	? 3	? 3	? 1	? 0	? 0	? 0	? 0	Tie
DYM/Prensa Ibérica	25–30 Oct 2019	?	?	? 3	? 2	? 1	? 0	? 1	? 0	? 0	?
CIS	21 Sep–13 Oct 2019	343	?	? 3	? 2	? 1	? 0	? 1	? 0	? 0	?
Sondaxe/La Voz de Galicia	26 Sep–3 Oct 2019	?	?	28.4; 2	28.6; 3	13.7; 1	5.6; 0	5.3; 0	? 0	11.9; 1	0.2
2019 EP election	26 May 2019	—N/a	56.0	36.5; 3	26.8; 2	9.9; 1	6.7; 0	12.0; 1	2.4; 0	–	9.7
April 2019 general election	28 Apr 2019	—N/a	64.6	32.2; 3	25.0; 2	17.5; 1	11.1; 1	5.6; 0	4.8; 0	–	7.2

=== Santa Cruz de Tenerife ===
Polling firm/Commissioner	Fieldwork date	Sample size	Turnout	PSOE	CC–NCa	PP	Unidas Podemos	Cs	Vox	Más País—Equo	Lead
November 2019 general election	10 Nov 2019	—N/a	54.7	28.6; 2	16.5; 1	20.2; 2	13.9; 1	5.0; 0	11.5; 1	1.4; 0	8.4
Perfiles	2 Nov 2019	600	?	32.0– 33.0; 3/4	16.0– 17.0; 1/2	14.0– 15.0; 1	14.0– 15.0; 1	6.0– 7.0; 0	8.0– 9.0; 0/1	? 0	16.0
GAD3/Vocento	14–31 Oct 2019	?	?	30.0; 3	12.0; 1	21.0; 2	13.0; 1	8.0; 0	10.0; 0	? 0	9.0
CIS	21 Sep–13 Oct 2019	356	?	? 3	? 1	? 1	? 1	? 1	? 0	? 0	?
2019 EP election	26 May 2019	—N/a	51.5	31.5; 3	26.4; 2	15.9; 1	10.1; 1	6.8; 0	3.0; 0	–	5.1
April 2019 general election	28 Apr 2019	—N/a	61.3	27.3; 2	19.9; 2	14.8; 1	14.7; 1	13.9; 1	6.1; 0	–	7.4

=== Seville ===
Polling firm/Commissioner	Fieldwork date	Sample size	Turnout	PSOE	Cs	Unidas Podemos	PP	Vox	Más País	Lead
November 2019 general election	10 Nov 2019	—N/a	69.2	36.1; 5	7.9; 1	14.6; 2	17.9; 2	17.9; 2	2.1; 0	18.2
GAD3/Vocento	14–31 Oct 2019	?	?	36.0; 5	9.0; 1	13.0; 1/2	19.0; 2/3	18.0; 2	? 0	17.0
Nexo	21–25 Oct 2019	500	74.6	38.4; 5/6	8.5; 1	12.5; 1/2	15.2; 2	18.3; 2	3.1; 0	20.1
CIS	21 Sep–13 Oct 2019	489	?	? 6/7	? 1	? 2	? 1/2	? 1	? 0	?
2019 EP election	26 May 2019	—N/a	60.7	43.8; 6	12.7; 1	13.5; 2	17.7; 2	7.2; 1	–	26.1
April 2019 general election	28 Apr 2019	—N/a	73.7	37.1; 5	16.7; 2	16.0; 2	14.5; 2	12.2; 1	–	20.4

=== Teruel ===
Polling firm/Commissioner	Fieldwork date	Sample size	Turnout	PSOE	PP	Cs	Vox	Unidas Podemos	¡TE!	Lead
November 2019 general election	10 Nov 2019	—N/a	69.5	25.5; 1	23.6; 1	5.0; 0	12.6; 0	5.4; 0	26.7; 1	1.2
A+M/El Heraldo de Aragón	28–31 Oct 2019	?	68.1	27.5; 1	25.9; 1	8.4; 0	9.3; 0	8.1; 0	19.1; 1	1.6
A+M/El Heraldo de Aragón	8–15 Oct 2019	?	64.1	24.2; 1	22.6; 1	12.6; 0	10.4; 0	9.2; 0	19.2; 1	1.6
CIS	21 Sep–13 Oct 2019	299	?	? 2	? 1	? 0	? 0	? 0	? 0	?
2019 EP election	26 May 2019	—N/a	71.1	37.1; 2	26.3; 1	15.0; 0	6.9; 0	8.2; 0	–	10.8
April 2019 general election	28 Apr 2019	—N/a	73.7	32.8; 1	23.8; 1	19.7; 1	10.7; 0	10.5; 0	–	9.0

=== Valencia ===
Polling firm/Commissioner	Fieldwork date	Sample size	Turnout	PSOE	PP	Cs	Unidas Podemos	Vox	MC	Lead
November 2019 general election	10 Nov 2019	—N/a	71.2	27.0; 4	22.1; 4	7.7; 1	13.8; 2	17.7; 3	8.8; 1	4.9
SyM Consulting/EPDA	31 Oct–2 Nov 2019	?	?	20.8; 3/4	22.5; 4	9.6; 1	16.4; 2/3	12.6; 2	14.7; 2	1.7
GAD3/Vocento	14–31 Oct 2019	?	?	? 4/5	? 3/4	? 1	? 2	? 3	? 1	?
CIS	21 Sep–13 Oct 2019	532	?	? 4/5	? 2/3	? 2	? 2/3	? 1/2	? 1/2	?
2019 EP election	26 May 2019	—N/a	66.6	32.2; 6	21.0; 3	14.0; 2	10.1; 1	7.3; 1	10.8; 2	11.2
April 2019 general election	28 Apr 2019	—N/a	74.9	27.1; 4	17.6; 3	17.5; 3	14.5; 2	11.7; 2	8.7; 1	9.5

=== Zamora ===
Polling firm/Commissioner	Fieldwork date	Sample size	Turnout	PSOE	PP	Cs	Vox	Unidas Podemos	Lead
November 2019 general election	10 Nov 2019	—N/a	60.2	32.8; 1	33.6; 1	6.9; 0	17.1; 1	7.0; 0	0.8
GAD3/Vocento	14–31 Oct 2019	?	?	? 1	? 2	? 0	? 0	6.0; 0	?
DYM/Prensa Ibérica	25–30 Oct 2019	?	?	31.4; 1	29.7; 1	12.8; 0	17.6; 1	7.0; 0	1.7
2019 EP election	26 May 2019	—N/a	61.8	36.4; 2	31.9; 1	13.5; 0	6.5; 0	6.9; 0	4.5
April 2019 general election	28 Apr 2019	—N/a	66.4	31.3; 1	29.6; 1	16.9; 1	11.6; 0	8.3; 0	1.7

=== Zaragoza ===
Polling firm/Commissioner	Fieldwork date	Sample size	Turnout	PSOE	Cs	PP	Unidas Podemos	Vox	Más País–CHA–Equo	Lead
November 2019 general election	10 Nov 2019	—N/a	70.0	30.9; 3	9.2; 0	23.4; 2	11.3; 1	18.0; 1	4.5; 0	7.5
A+M/El Heraldo de Aragón	28–31 Oct 2019	?	67.6	30.4; 2/3	12.8; 1	25.4; 2	11.2; 0/1	14.9; 1	2.6; 0	5.0
GAD3/Vocento	14–31 Oct 2019	?	?	? 2	? 1	? 2	? 1	? 1	? 0	Tie
A+M/El Heraldo de Aragón	8–15 Oct 2019	?	67.0	26.8; 2	15.6; 1	22.9; 2	11.0; 1	14.9; 1	5.6; 0	3.9
CIS	21 Sep–13 Oct 2019	397	?	? 3	? 0/1	? 2	? 1	? 0/1	? 0	?
2019 EP election	26 May 2019	—N/a	66.8	35.6; 3	18.2; 1	20.8; 2	10.8; 1	8.3; 0	2.1; 0	14.8
April 2019 general election	28 Apr 2019	—N/a	75.8	31.3; 3	20.9; 1	18.0; 1	14.0; 1	12.7; 1	–	10.4

== See also ==
- Opinion polling for the November 2019 Spanish general election
