= Revolutionary Anticapitalist Left =

Revolutionary Anticapitalist Left Izquierda Anticapitalista Revolucionaria
- Founded: 2015
- Split from: Anticapitalistas
- Newspaper: Revista IZAR
- Ideology: Trotskyism; Revolutionary socialism Internationalism
- Political position: Far-left
- National affiliation: No Hay Tiempo Que Perder Iniciative

Website
- https://izarrevolucion.com/

Revolutionary Anticapitalist Left (Spanish: Izquierda Anticapitalista Revolucionaria, IZAR) is a Trotskyist political party in Spain.

== History ==
IZAR was founded by a split of Anticapitalistas, after some members of that organization were expelled for being critical of Podemos. in the 2016 general elections IZAR won 854 votes in the three districts were they ran: 143 in Almería (0.05%), 456 in Málaga (0.06%) and 255 in Granada (0.05%). The party had a city councilor in Burgos (elected within the Imagina Burgos list) between 2015 and 2019.
