= Granada (Congress of Deputies constituency) =

Electoral constituency in Spain

Coordinates: 37°15′N 3°15′W

- Congress of Deputies; Electoral constituency
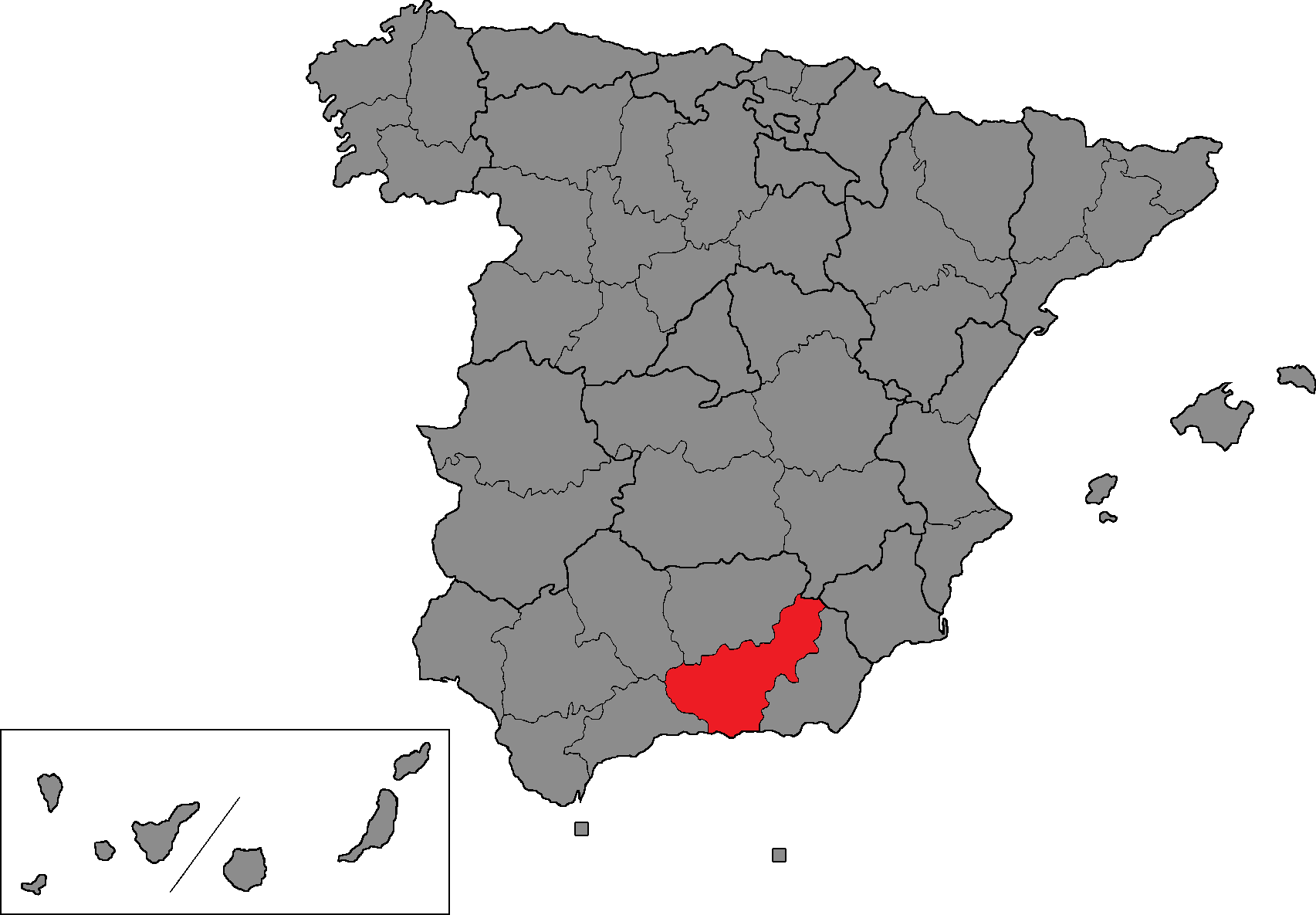
- Location of Granada within Spain
- Province: Granada
- Autonomous community: Andalusia
- Population: ▲937,135 (2024)
- Electorate: ▲765,478 (2023)
- Major settlements: Granada, Motril

Current constituency
- Created: 1977
- Seats: 7
- Members: PP (3); PSOE (2); Vox (1); Podemos (1)

Granada is one of the 52 constituencies represented in the Congress of Deputies, the lower chamber of the Spanish parliament, the Cortes Generales. The constituency (whose boundaries correspond to those of the Spanish homonymous province) currently elects seven deputies. The electoral system uses the D'Hondt method and closed-list proportional voting, with a minimum threshold of three percent.

== Electoral system ==
The constituency was created as per the Political Reform Law and was first contested in the 1977 general election. The Law provided for the provinces of Spain to be established as multi-member districts in the Congress of Deputies, with this regulation being maintained under the Spanish Constitution of 1978. Additionally, the Constitution requires for any modification of the provincial limits to be approved under an organic law, needing an absolute majority in the Cortes Generales.

Voting is based on universal suffrage, comprising all Spanish nationals over 18 years of age with full political rights, provided that they have not been deprived of the right to vote by a final sentence. The only exception was in 1977, when this was limited to nationals over 21 years of age and in full enjoyment of their political and civil rights. Amendments in 2011 required non-resident citizens to apply for voting, a system known as "begged" voting (Spanish: Voto rogado). which was abolished in 2022. Further, amendments in 2018 granted the right to vote to those legally incapacitated. The Congress of Deputies has a minimum of 300 and a maximum of 400 seats, with electoral provisions fixing its size at 350. Of these, 348 are elected in 50 multi-member constituencies corresponding to the provinces of Spain—each of which is assigned an initial minimum of two seats and the remaining 248 distributed in proportion to population—using the D'Hondt method and closed-list proportional voting, with a three percent-threshold of valid votes (including blank ballots) in each constituency. The remaining two seats are allocated to Ceuta and Melilla as single-member districts elected by plurality voting. The use of this electoral method may result in a higher effective threshold depending on district magnitude and vote distribution. The law does not provide for by-elections to fill vacant seats; instead, any vacancies arising after the proclamation of candidates and during the legislative term are filled by the next candidates on the party lists or, when required, by designated substitutes.

The electoral law allows for parties and federations registered in the interior ministry, alliances and groupings of electors to present lists of candidates. Parties and federations intending to form an alliance are required to inform the relevant electoral commission within 10 days of the election call—15 before 1985—whereas groupings of electors need to secure the signature of at least one percent of the electorate in the constituencies for which they seek election—one permille of the electorate, with a compulsory minimum of 500 signatures, until 1985—disallowing electors from signing for more than one list. Also since 2011, parties, federations or alliances that have not obtained a mandate in either chamber of the Cortes at the preceding election are required to secure the signature of at least 0.1 percent of electors in the aforementioned constituencies. Amendments in 2007 required a balanced composition of men and women in the electoral lists, so that candidates of either sex made up at least 40 percent of the total composition; further amendments in 2024 required the use of a zipper system.

== Deputies ==
Deputies 1977–present
Key to parties PCE IU IULV–CA U.Podemos Podemos Sumar PSOE Cs UCD PP CP AP Vox
Legislature	Election	Distribution
Constituent	1977	3 / 4
1st	1979	1 / 3 / 3
2nd	1982	5 / 2
3rd	1986	5 / 2
4th	1989	1 / 4 / 2
5th	1993	4 / 3
6th	1996	1 / 3 / 3
7th	2000	4 / 3
8th	2004	4 / 3
9th	2008	4 / 3
10th	2011	3 / 4
11th	2015	1 / 2 / 1 / 3
12th	2016	1 / 2 / 1 / 3
13th	2019 (Apr)	1 / 3 / 1 / 1 / 1
14th	2019 (Nov)	1 / 3 / 2 / 1
15th	2023	1 / 2 / 3 / 1

== General elections ==
=== 2026 ===
Summary of the 29 November 2026 Congress of Deputies election results in Granada
Parties and alliances	Popular vote			Seats	
Parties and alliances	Votes	%	±pp	Total	+/−
People's Party (PP)					
Spanish Socialist Workers' Party (PSOE)					
Vox (Vox)					
Andalusian Broad Front (FA)^{1}			n/a		
We Can (Podemos)^{1}			n/a		
Animalist Party with the Environment (PACMA)					
For a Fairer World (M+J)					
Communist Party of the Workers of Spain (PCTE)					
Workers' Front (FO)					
Forward Andalusia (Adelante Andalucía)			New		
The Party is Over (SALF)			New		
Blank ballots					
Total				7	±0
Valid votes					
Invalid votes					
Votes cast / turnout					
Abstentions					
Registered voters	791,066				
Sources
Footnotes: ^{1} Within the Unite Andalusia alliance in the 2023 election.

=== 2023 ===
Summary of the 23 July 2023 Congress of Deputies election results in Granada
Parties and alliances	Popular vote			Seats	
Parties and alliances	Votes	%	±pp	Total	+/−
People's Party (PP)	185,996	36.99	+15.20	3	+1
Spanish Socialist Workers' Party (PSOE)	165,862	32.98	–0.20	2	–1
Vox (Vox)	81,080	16.12	–4.58	1	±0
Unite Andalusia (Sumar)^{1}	58,567	11.65	–2.43	1	±0
Animalist Party with the Environment (PACMA)^{2}	3,143	0.63	–0.22	0	±0
Together for Granada (JxG)	1,218	0.24	New	0	±0
For a Fairer World (PUM+J)	765	0.15	+0.02	0	±0
Communist Party of the Workers of Spain (PCTE)	695	0.14	+0.07	0	±0
Workers' Front (FO)	658	0.13	New	0	±0
Walking Together (CJ)	461	0.09	New	0	±0
Zero Cuts (Recortes Cero)	343	0.07	–0.04	0	±0
Blank ballots	4,057	0.81	–0.13		
Total	502,845			7	±0
Valid votes	502,845	98.70	+0.35		
Invalid votes	6,641	1.30	–0.35		
Votes cast / turnout	509,486	66.56	+1.54		
Abstentions	255,992	33.44	–1.54		
Registered voters	765,478				
Sources
Footnotes: ^{1} Unite Andalusia results are compared to the combined totals of United We Can and More Country–Andalusia in the November 2019 election.; ^{2} Animalist Party with the Environment results are compared to Animalist Party Against Mistreatment of Animals totals in the November 2019 election.

=== November 2019 ===
Summary of the 10 November 2019 Congress of Deputies election results in Granada
Parties and alliances	Popular vote			Seats	
Parties and alliances	Votes	%	±pp	Total	+/−
Spanish Socialist Workers' Party (PSOE)	160,190	33.18	–0.70	3	±0
People's Party (PP)	105,192	21.79	+3.35	2	+1
Vox (Vox)	99,928	20.70	+6.59	1	±0
United We Can (Podemos–IULV–CA)	59,331	12.29	–1.35	1	±0
Citizens–Party of the Citizenry (Cs)	37,772	7.82	–9.54	0	–1
More Country–Andalusia (Más País–Andalucía)	8,629	1.79	New	0	±0
Animalist Party Against Mistreatment of Animals (PACMA)	4,095	0.85	–0.26	0	±0
For a Fairer World (PUM+J)	624	0.13	+0.01	0	±0
Andalusia by Herself (AxSí)	619	0.13	–0.02	0	±0
Zero Cuts–Green Group (Recortes Cero–GV)	545	0.11	–0.01	0	±0
Andalusian Convergence (CAnda)	520	0.11	New	0	±0
Communist Party of the Andalusian People (PCPA)	371	0.08	+0.01	0	±0
Communist Party of the Workers of Spain (PCTE)	322	0.07	±0.00	0	±0
Revolutionary Anticapitalist Left (IZAR)	113	0.02	–0.03	0	±0
Blank ballots	4,528	0.94	+0.23		
Total	482,779			7	±0
Valid votes	482,779	98.35	–0.20		
Invalid votes	8,123	1.65	+0.20		
Votes cast / turnout	490,902	65.02	–5.57		
Abstentions	264,105	34.98	+5.57		
Registered voters	755,007				

=== April 2019 ===
Summary of the 28 April 2019 Congress of Deputies election results in Granada
Parties and alliances	Popular vote			Seats	
Parties and alliances	Votes	%	±pp	Total	+/−
Spanish Socialist Workers' Party (PSOE)	177,478	33.88	+2.94	3	+1
People's Party (PP)	96,588	18.44	–16.84	1	–2
Citizens–Party of the Citizenry (Cs)	90,935	17.36	+3.88	1	±0
Vox (Vox)	73,914	14.11	+13.91	1	+1
United We Can (Podemos–IULV–CA–Equo)	71,466	13.64	–4.13	1	±0
Animalist Party Against Mistreatment of Animals (PACMA)	5,804	1.11	+0.04	0	±0
Retirees Party for the Future. Dignity and Democracy ("JF")	876	0.17	New	0	±0
Andalusia by Herself (AxSí)	779	0.15	New	0	±0
Zero Cuts–Green Group (Recortes Cero–GV)	630	0.12	–0.04	0	±0
For a Fairer World (PUM+J)	624	0.12	New	0	±0
Communist Party of the Workers of Spain (PCTE)	391	0.07	New	0	±0
Communist Party of the Andalusian People (PCPA)	373	0.07	–0.06	0	±0
Revolutionary Anticapitalist Left (IZAR)	257	0.05	+0.01	0	±0
Blank ballots	3,728	0.71	+0.01		
Total	523,843			7	±0
Valid votes	523,843	98.55	–0.51		
Invalid votes	7,709	1.45	+0.51		
Votes cast / turnout	531,552	70.59	+4.58		
Abstentions	221,439	29.41	–4.58		
Registered voters	752,991				

=== 2016 ===
Summary of the 26 June 2016 Congress of Deputies election results in Granada
Parties and alliances	Popular vote			Seats	
Parties and alliances	Votes	%	±pp	Total	+/−
People's Party (PP)	172,721	35.28	+4.18	3	±0
Spanish Socialist Workers' Party (PSOE)	151,445	30.94	–0.03	2	±0
United We Can for Andalusia (Podemos–IU–Equo)^{1}	86,975	17.77	–3.72	1	±0
Citizens–Party of the Citizenry (C's)	66,000	13.48	–0.40	1	±0
Animalist Party Against Mistreatment of Animals (PACMA)	5,228	1.07	+0.32	0	±0
Union, Progress and Democracy (UPyD)	1,158	0.24	–0.29	0	±0
Vox (Vox)	993	0.20	–0.04	0	±0
Zero Cuts–Green Group (Recortes Cero–GV)	763	0.16	+0.03	0	±0
Communist Party of the Peoples of Spain (PCPE)	641	0.13	–0.01	0	±0
Revolutionary Anticapitalist Left (IZAR)	192	0.04	New	0	±0
Blank ballots	3,424	0.70	+0.03		
Total	489,540			7	±0
Valid votes	489,540	99.06	–0.12		
Invalid votes	4,631	0.94	+0.12		
Votes cast / turnout	494,171	66.01	–2.75		
Abstentions	254,408	33.99	+2.75		
Registered voters	748,579				
Sources
Footnotes: ^{1} United We Can results are compared to the combined totals of We Can and United Left/Greens–Assembly for Andalusia–Popular Unity in Common in the 2015 election.

=== 2015 ===
Summary of the 20 December 2015 Congress of Deputies election results in Granada
Parties and alliances	Popular vote			Seats	
Parties and alliances	Votes	%	±pp	Total	+/−
People's Party (PP)	158,693	31.10	–15.64	3	–1
Spanish Socialist Workers' Party (PSOE)	158,027	30.97	–5.56	2	–1
We Can (Podemos)	83,650	16.39	New	1	+1
Citizens–Party of the Citizenry (C's)	70,845	13.88	New	1	+1
United Left/Greens–Assembly for Andalusia–Popular Unity (IULV–CA–UPeC)	26,022	5.10	–2.83	0	±0
Animalist Party Against Mistreatment of Animals (PACMA)	3,843	0.75	+0.48	0	±0
Union, Progress and Democracy (UPyD)	2,697	0.53	–4.63	0	±0
Vox (Vox)	1,245	0.24	New	0	±0
Communist Party of the Peoples of Spain (PCPE)	696	0.14	–0.03	0	±0
Zero Cuts–Green Group (Recortes Cero–GV)	638	0.13	New	0	±0
For a Fairer World (PUM+J)	445	0.09	–0.02	0	±0
Blank ballots	3,442	0.67	–0.37		
Total	510,243			7	±0
Valid votes	510,243	99.18	+0.20		
Invalid votes	4,235	0.82	–0.20		
Votes cast / turnout	514,478	68.76	–1.16		
Abstentions	233,711	31.24	+1.16		
Registered voters	748,189				

=== 2011 ===
Summary of the 20 November 2011 Congress of Deputies election results in Granada
Parties and alliances	Popular vote			Seats	
Parties and alliances	Votes	%	±pp	Total	+/−
People's Party (PP)	237,785	46.74	+5.66	4	+1
Spanish Socialist Workers' Party (PSOE)	185,867	36.53	–13.43	3	–1
United Left/The Greens–Assembly for Andalusia: Plural Left (IULV–CA)	40,360	7.93	+2.91	0	±0
Union, Progress and Democracy (UPyD)	26,255	5.16	+4.16	0	±0
Andalusian Party (PA)^{1}	3,942	0.77	–0.13	0	±0
Equo (Equo)	3,852	0.76	New	0	±0
Animalist Party Against Mistreatment of Animals (PACMA)	1,370	0.27	+0.13	0	±0
Blank Seats (EB)	1,200	0.24	New	0	±0
Communist Party of the Peoples of Spain (PCPE)	873	0.17	+0.13	0	±0
Regionalist Party for Eastern Andalusia (PRAO)	620	0.12	New	0	±0
For a Fairer World (PUM+J)	544	0.11	±0.00	0	±0
Anti-capitalists (Anticapitalistas)	484	0.10	New	0	±0
Internationalist Solidarity and Self-Management (SAIn)	185	0.04	+0.01	0	±0
Communist Unification of Spain (UCE)	151	0.03	New	0	±0
Blank ballots	5,294	1.04	+0.17		
Total	508,782			7	±0
Valid votes	508,782	98.98	–0.50		
Invalid votes	5,252	1.02	+0.50		
Votes cast / turnout	514,034	69.92	–4.39		
Abstentions	221,167	30.08	+4.39		
Registered voters	735,201				
Sources
Footnotes: ^{1} Andalusian Party results are compared to Andalusian Coalition totals in the 2008 election.

=== 2008 ===
Summary of the 9 March 2008 Congress of Deputies election results in Granada
Parties and alliances	Popular vote			Seats	
Parties and alliances	Votes	%	±pp	Total	+/−
Spanish Socialist Workers' Party (PSOE)	264,974	49.96	–1.51	4	±0
People's Party (PP)	217,874	41.08	+4.04	3	±0
United Left/The Greens–Assembly for Andalusia–Alternative (IULV–CA)	26,615	5.02	–0.96	0	±0
Union, Progress and Democracy (UPyD)	5,308	1.00	New	0	±0
Andalusian Coalition (CA)^{1}	4,747	0.90	–2.27	0	±0
The Greens (Verdes)	2,010	0.38	New	0	±0
Anti-Bullfighting Party Against Mistreatment of Animals (PACMA)	748	0.14	New	0	±0
For a Fairer World (PUM+J)	591	0.11	New	0	±0
Social Democratic Party (PSD)	484	0.09	New	0	±0
Citizens–Party of the Citizenry (C's)	450	0.08	New	0	±0
Citizens for Blank Votes (CenB)	274	0.05	–0.08	0	±0
Communist Party of the Peoples of Spain (PCPE)	238	0.04	–0.03	0	±0
Family and Life Party (PFyV)	217	0.04	–0.04	0	±0
Spanish Phalanx of the CNSO (FE de las JONS)	205	0.04	±0.00	0	±0
Internationalist Solidarity and Self-Management (SAIn)	162	0.03	New	0	±0
Authentic Phalanx (FA)	161	0.03	New	0	±0
National Democracy (DN)	155	0.03	–0.01	0	±0
Humanist Party (PH)	133	0.03	–0.05	0	±0
Spain 2000 (E–2000)	127	0.02	–0.01	0	±0
Spanish Alternative (AES)	113	0.02	New	0	±0
National Alliance (AN)	73	0.01	New	0	±0
Spanish Front (Frente)	64	0.01	New	0	±0
Blank ballots	4,600	0.87	–0.71		
Total	530,323			7	±0
Valid votes	530,323	99.48	+0.11		
Invalid votes	2,766	0.52	–0.11		
Votes cast / turnout	533,089	74.31	–1.41		
Abstentions	184,298	25.69	+1.41		
Registered voters	717,387				
Sources
Footnotes: ^{1} Andalusian Coalition results are compared to the combined totals of Andalusian Party and Socialist Party of Andalusia in the 2004 election.

=== 2004 ===
Summary of the 14 March 2004 Congress of Deputies election results in Granada
Parties and alliances	Popular vote			Seats	
Parties and alliances	Votes	%	±pp	Total	+/−
Spanish Socialist Workers' Party (PSOE)	268,870	51.47	+7.11	4	±0
People's Party (PP)	193,484	37.04	–5.62	3	±0
United Left/The Greens–Assembly for Andalusia (IULV–CA)	31,227	5.98	–1.27	0	±0
Andalusian Party (PA)	14,030	2.69	–0.77	0	±0
Socialist Party of Andalusia (PSA)	2,490	0.48	New	0	±0
Citizens for Blank Votes (CenB)	682	0.13	New	0	±0
Democratic and Social Centre (CDS)	480	0.09	+0.05	0	±0
Humanist Party (PH)	418	0.08	±0.00	0	±0
Family and Life Party (PFyV)	415	0.08	New	0	±0
Party of Precarious Workers (PTPRE)	390	0.07	New	0	±0
Communist Party of the Peoples of Spain (PCPE)	372	0.07	–0.05	0	±0
Republican Left (IR)	244	0.05	New	0	±0
National Democracy (DN)	203	0.04	New	0	±0
Spanish Democratic Party (PADE)	201	0.04	–0.01	0	±0
Spanish Phalanx of the CNSO (FE de las JONS)^{1}	190	0.04	±0.00	0	±0
The Phalanx (FE)	170	0.03	New	0	±0
Spain 2000 (E–2000)	167	0.03	–0.01	0	±0
Republican Social Movement (MSR)	113	0.02	New	0	±0
Blank ballots	8,276	1.58	+0.33		
Total	522,422			7	±0
Valid votes	522,422	99.37	+0.09		
Invalid votes	3,300	0.63	–0.09		
Votes cast / turnout	525,722	75.72	+6.12		
Abstentions	168,582	24.28	–6.12		
Registered voters	694,304				
Sources
Footnotes: ^{1} Spanish Phalanx of the CNSO results are compared to Independent Spanish Phalanx–Phalanx 2000 totals in the 2000 election.

=== 2000 ===
Summary of the 12 March 2000 Congress of Deputies election results in Granada
Parties and alliances	Popular vote			Seats	
Parties and alliances	Votes	%	±pp	Total	+/−
Spanish Socialist Workers' Party–Progressives (PSOE–p)	213,019	44.36	–2.13	4	+1
People's Party (PP)	204,875	42.66	+4.28	3	±0
United Left/The Greens–Assembly for Andalusia (IULV–CA)	34,809	7.25	–4.73	0	–1
Andalusian Party (PA)	16,594	3.46	+1.53	0	±0
Liberal Independent Group (GIL)	1,112	0.23	New	0	±0
Andalusian Left (IA)	876	0.18	New	0	±0
Communist Party of the Peoples of Spain (PCPE)	596	0.12	–0.02	0	±0
Andalusia Assembly (A)	443	0.09	New	0	±0
Humanist Party (PH)	383	0.08	+0.02	0	±0
Andalusian Nation (NA)	383	0.08	+0.02	0	±0
Natural Law Party (PLN)	305	0.06	New	0	±0
Spanish Democratic Party (PADE)	263	0.05	New	0	±0
Centrist Union–Democratic and Social Centre (UC–CDS)	212	0.04	–0.05	0	±0
Independent Spanish Phalanx–Phalanx 2000 (FEI–FE 2000)	196	0.04	New	0	±0
Spain 2000 Platform (ES2000)	182	0.04	New	0	±0
Blank ballots	5,994	1.25	+0.52		
Total	480,242			7	±0
Valid votes	480,242	99.28	–0.25		
Invalid votes	3,489	0.72	+0.25		
Votes cast / turnout	483,731	69.60	–9.09		
Abstentions	211,237	30.40	+9.09		
Registered voters	694,968				

=== 1996 ===
Summary of the 3 March 1996 Congress of Deputies election results in Granada
Parties and alliances	Popular vote			Seats	
Parties and alliances	Votes	%	±pp	Total	+/−
Spanish Socialist Workers' Party of Andalusia (PSOE–A)	237,446	46.49	–2.91	3	–1
People's Party (PP)	196,049	38.38	+3.74	3	±0
United Left/The Greens–Assembly for Andalusia (IULV–CA)	61,214	11.98	+1.09	1	+1
Andalusian Party (PA)^{1}	9,878	1.93	+0.05	0	±0
Communist Party of the Andalusian People (PCPA)	716	0.14	+0.02	0	±0
Centrist Union (UC)	469	0.09	–1.06	0	±0
Workers' Revolutionary Party (PRT)	351	0.07	New	0	±0
Andalusian Nation (NA)	329	0.06	New	0	±0
Humanist Party (PH)	302	0.06	+0.04	0	±0
Authentic Spanish Phalanx (FEA)	290	0.06	New	0	±0
Blank ballots	3,749	0.73	+0.26		
Total	510,793			7	±0
Valid votes	510,793	99.53	–0.13		
Invalid votes	2,431	0.47	+0.13		
Votes cast / turnout	513,224	78.69	+2.68		
Abstentions	139,027	21.31	–2.68		
Registered voters	652,251				
Sources
Footnotes: ^{1} Andalusian Party results are compared to the combined totals of Andalusian Party and Andalusian Progress Party in the 1993 election.

=== 1993 ===
Summary of the 6 June 1993 Congress of Deputies election results in Granada
Parties and alliances	Popular vote			Seats	
Parties and alliances	Votes	%	±pp	Total	+/−
Spanish Socialist Workers' Party of Andalusia (PSOE–A)	229,537	49.40	–0.65	4	±0
People's Party (PP)	160,955	34.64	+10.03	3	+1
United Left–Assembly for Andalusia (IU–CA)	50,588	10.89	–0.62	0	–1
Andalusian Party (PA)	6,978	1.50	–1.15	0	±0
Democratic and Social Centre (CDS)	5,324	1.15	–4.87	0	±0
The Greens of Andalusia (Verdes)^{1}	3,687	0.79	–0.15	0	±0
Andalusian Progress Party (PAP)	1,757	0.38	New	0	±0
Liberal Independent Group (GIL)	1,034	0.22	New	0	±0
The Ecologists (LE)	1,006	0.22	–0.31	0	±0
Communist Party of the Andalusian People (PCPA)	550	0.12	–0.08	0	±0
Ruiz-Mateos Group–European Democratic Alliance (ARM–ADE)	480	0.10	–1.27	0	±0
Spanish Phalanx of the CNSO (FE–JONS)	245	0.05	–0.06	0	±0
Natural Law Party (PLN)	132	0.03	New	0	±0
Humanist Party (PH)	114	0.02	–0.05	0	±0
Coalition for a New Socialist Party (CNPS)^{2}	111	0.02	–0.03	0	±0
Communist Unification of Spain (UCE)	0	0.00	New	0	±0
Blank ballots	2,167	0.47	–0.08		
Total	464,645			7	±0
Valid votes	464,645	99.66	+0.23		
Invalid votes	1,608	0.34	–0.23		
Votes cast / turnout	466,253	76.01	+6.89		
Abstentions	147,156	23.99	–6.89		
Registered voters	613,409				
Sources
Footnotes: ^{1} The Greens of Andalusia results are compared to The Greens–Green List totals in the 1989 election.; ^{2} Coalition for a New Socialist Party results are compared to Alliance for the Republic totals in the 1989 election.

=== 1989 ===
Summary of the 29 October 1989 Congress of Deputies election results in Granada
Parties and alliances	Popular vote			Seats	
Parties and alliances	Votes	%	±pp	Total	+/−
Spanish Socialist Workers' Party of Andalusia (PSOE–A)	204,596	50.05	–2.93	4	–1
People's Party (PP)^{1}	100,619	24.61	–1.66	2	±0
United Left–Assembly for Andalusia (IU–CA)	47,067	11.51	+4.46	1	+1
Democratic and Social Centre (CDS)	24,619	6.02	–0.83	0	±0
Andalusian Party (PA)	10,824	2.65	+1.36	0	±0
Ruiz-Mateos Group (Ruiz-Mateos)	5,613	1.37	New	0	±0
Workers' Party of Spain–Communist Unity (PTE–UC)^{2}	4,310	1.05	–1.42	0	±0
The Greens–Green List (LV–LV)	3,833	0.94	New	0	±0
The Ecologist Greens (LVE)	2,179	0.53	New	0	±0
Workers' Socialist Party (PST)	1,042	0.25	+0.03	0	±0
Communist Party of the Andalusian People (PCPA)	800	0.20	New	0	±0
Spanish Phalanx of the CNSO (FE–JONS)	460	0.11	–0.10	0	±0
Humanist Party (PH)	219	0.05	New	0	±0
Alliance for the Republic (AxR)	191	0.05	New	0	±0
Centrist Unity–Democratic Spanish Party (PED)	174	0.04	New	0	±0
Blank ballots	2,253	0.55	+0.15		
Total	408,799			7	±0
Valid votes	408,799	99.43	+0.49		
Invalid votes	2,362	0.57	–0.49		
Votes cast / turnout	411,161	69.12	–0.27		
Abstentions	183,651	30.88	+0.27		
Registered voters	594,812				
Sources
Footnotes: ^{1} People's Party results are compared to People's Coalition totals in the 1986 election.; ^{2} Workers' Party of Spain–Communist Unity results are compared to Communists' Unity Board totals in the 1986 election.

=== 1986 ===
Summary of the 22 June 1986 Congress of Deputies election results in Granada
Parties and alliances	Popular vote			Seats	
Parties and alliances	Votes	%	±pp	Total	+/−
Spanish Socialist Workers' Party (PSOE)	212,031	52.98	–4.81	5	±0
People's Coalition (AP–PDP–PL)^{1}	105,156	26.27	+2.19	2	±0
United Left (IU)^{2}	28,198	7.05	–0.02	0	±0
Democratic and Social Centre (CDS)	27,398	6.85	+5.05	0	±0
Communists' Unity Board (MUC)	9,890	2.47	New	0	±0
Andalusian Party (PA)	5,165	1.29	+0.07	0	±0
Socialist Party of the Andalusian People (PSPA)	4,303	1.08	New	0	±0
Democratic Reformist Party (PRD)	3,103	0.78	New	0	±0
Workers' Socialist Party (PST)	865	0.22	New	0	±0
Spanish Phalanx of the CNSO (FE–JONS)	848	0.21	+0.21	0	±0
Communist Unification of Spain (UCE)	619	0.15	+0.09	0	±0
Republican Popular Unity (UPR)^{3}	432	0.11	+0.05	0	±0
National Unity Coalition (CUN)	366	0.09	New	0	±0
Party of the Communists of Catalonia (PCC)	267	0.07	New	0	±0
Blank ballots	1,604	0.40	+0.13		
Total	400,245			7	±0
Valid votes	400,245	98.94	–0.11		
Invalid votes	4,288	1.06	+0.11		
Votes cast / turnout	404,533	69.39	–7.38		
Abstentions	178,434	30.61	+7.38		
Registered voters	582,967				
Sources
Footnotes: ^{1} People's Coalition results are compared to People's Alliance–People's Democratic Party totals in the 1982 election.; ^{2} United Left results are compared to Communist Party of Andalusia totals in the 1982 election.; ^{3} Republican Popular Unity results are compared to Communist Party of Spain (Marxist–Leninist) totals in the 1982 election.

=== 1982 ===
Summary of the 28 October 1982 Congress of Deputies election results in Granada
Parties and alliances	Popular vote			Seats	
Parties and alliances	Votes	%	±pp	Total	+/−
Spanish Socialist Workers' Party of Andalusia (PSA–PSOE)	234,154	57.79	+22.04	5	+2
People's Alliance–People's Democratic Party (AP–PDP)^{1}	97,554	24.08	+19.34	2	+2
Communist Party of Andalusia (PCA–PCE)	28,636	7.07	–5.60	0	–1
Union of the Democratic Centre (UCD)	27,897	6.88	–29.73	0	–3
Democratic and Social Centre (CDS)	7,276	1.80	New	0	±0
Socialist Party of Andalusia–Andalusian Party (PSA–PA)	4,939	1.22	–4.96	0	±0
New Force (FN)^{2}	2,029	0.50	–0.72	0	±0
Spanish Solidarity (SE)	454	0.11	New	0	±0
Communist Unity Candidacy (CUC)	369	0.09	New	0	±0
Falangist Movement of Spain (MFE)	316	0.08	New	0	±0
Communist Party of Spain (Marxist–Leninist) (PCE (m–l))	252	0.06	New	0	±0
Communist Unification of Spain (UCE)	249	0.06	New	0	±0
Socialist Party (PS)^{3}	0	0.00	–0.59	0	±0
Communist Movement of Andalusia (MCA)	0	0.00	–0.30	0	±0
Revolutionary Communist League (LCR)	0	0.00	–0.12	0	±0
Communist League–Internationalist Socialist Workers' Coalition (LC (COSI))	0	0.00	New	0	±0
Spanish Phalanx of the CNSO (FE–JONS)	0	0.00	New	0	±0
Blank ballots	1,079	0.27	+0.15		
Total	405,204			7	±0
Valid votes	405,204	99.05	–0.21		
Invalid votes	3,905	0.95	+0.21		
Votes cast / turnout	409,109	76.77	+8.03		
Abstentions	123,773	23.23	–8.03		
Registered voters	532,882				
Sources
Footnotes: ^{1} People's Alliance–People's Democratic Party results are compared to Democratic Coalition totals in the 1979 election.; ^{2} New Force results are compared to National Union totals in the 1979 election.; ^{3} Socialist Party results are compared to Spanish Socialist Workers' Party (historical) totals in the 1979 election.

=== 1979 ===
Summary of the 1 March 1979 Congress of Deputies election results in Granada
Parties and alliances	Popular vote			Seats	
Parties and alliances	Votes	%	±pp	Total	+/−
Union of the Democratic Centre (UCD)	131,107	36.61	–7.16	3	–1
Spanish Socialist Workers' Party (PSOE)^{1}	128,002	35.75	+0.07	3	±0
Communist Party of Spain (PCE)	45,384	12.67	+2.95	1	+1
Socialist Party of Andalusia–Andalusian Party (PSA–PA)	22,136	6.18	New	0	±0
Democratic Coalition (CD)^{2}	16,958	4.74	–2.31	0	±0
National Union (UN)	4,381	1.22	New	0	±0
Party of Labour of Spain (PTE)^{3}	3,161	0.88	–0.34	0	±0
Spanish Socialist Workers' Party (historical) (PSOEh)^{4}	2,123	0.59	–0.03	0	±0
Communist Movement–Organization of Communist Left (MC–OIC)	1,066	0.30	New	0	±0
Communist Unification of Spain (UCE)	820	0.23	New	0	±0
Communist Organization of Spain (Red Flag) (OCE–BR)	592	0.17	New	0	±0
Revolutionary Communist League (LCR)	430	0.12	New	0	±0
Workers and Peasants Party (POC)	418	0.12	New	0	±0
Republican Left (IR)	390	0.11	New	0	±0
Workers' Revolutionary Organization (ORT)	304	0.08	New	0	±0
Union for the Freedom of Speech (ULE)	187	0.05	New	0	±0
Carlist Party (PC)	174	0.05	New	0	±0
Blank ballots	440	0.12	–0.13		
Total	358,073			7	±0
Valid votes	358,073	99.26	+0.17		
Invalid votes	2,660	0.74	–0.17		
Votes cast / turnout	360,733	68.74	–8.20		
Abstentions	164,064	31.26	+8.20		
Registered voters	524,797				
Sources
Footnotes: ^{1} Spanish Socialist Workers' Party results are compared to the combined totals of Spanish Socialist Workers' Party and People's Socialist Party–Socialist Unity in the 1977 election.; ^{2} Democratic Coalition results are compared to People's Alliance totals in the 1977 election.; ^{3} Party of Labour of Spain results are compared to Democratic Left Front totals in the 1977 election.; ^{4} Spanish Socialist Workers' Party (historical) results are compared to Democratic Socialist Alliance totals in the 1977 election.

=== 1977 ===
Summary of the 15 June 1977 Congress of Deputies election results in Granada
Parties and alliances	Popular vote			Seats	
Parties and alliances	Votes	%	±pp	Total	+/−
Union of the Democratic Centre (UCD)	152,498	43.77	n/a	4	n/a
Spanish Socialist Workers' Party (PSOE)	111,746	32.07	n/a	3	n/a
Communist Party of Spain (PCE)	33,879	9.72	n/a	0	n/a
People's Alliance (AP)	24,573	7.05	n/a	0	n/a
People's Socialist Party–Socialist Unity (PSP–US)	12,567	3.61	n/a	0	n/a
Democratic Left Front (FDI)	4,235	1.22	n/a	0	n/a
Federation of Christian Democracy (FPD–ID)	3,104	0.89	n/a	0	n/a
Democratic Socialist Alliance (ASDCI)	2,146	0.62	n/a	0	n/a
Spanish Social Reform (RSE)	1,704	0.49	n/a	0	n/a
Andalusian Socialist Movement (MSA)	1,066	0.31	n/a	0	n/a
Left Andalusian Candidacy (CAI)	0	0.00	n/a	0	n/a
Blank ballots	875	0.25	n/a		
Total	348,393			7	n/a
Valid votes	348,393	99.09	n/a		
Invalid votes	3,202	0.91	n/a		
Votes cast / turnout	351,595	76.94	n/a		
Abstentions	105,357	23.06	n/a		
Registered voters	456,952				

== Bibliography ==
- Ley 1/1977, de 4 de enero, para la Reforma Política (Fundamental Law 1/1977). Official State Gazette (in Spanish). 4 January 1977. BOE-A-1977-165.
- Real Decreto-ley 20/1977, de 18 de marzo, sobre Normas Electorales (Royal Decree-Law 20/1977). Official State Gazette (in Spanish). 18 March 1977. BOE-A-1977-7445.
- Constitución Española (Constitution). Official State Gazette (in Spanish). 27 December 1978. BOE-A-1978-31229.
- Ley Orgánica 5/1985, de 19 de junio, del Régimen Electoral General (Organic Law 5/1985). Official State Gazette (in Spanish). 19 June 1985. BOE-A-1985-11672.
- Carreras de Odriozola, Albert; Tafunell Sambola, Xavier (2005) [1989]. Estadísticas históricas de España, siglos XIX-XX (PDF) (in Spanish). Vol. 1 (II ed.). Bilbao: Fundación BBVA. pp. 1072–1097. ISBN 84-96515-00-1. Archived from the original (PDF) on 24 September 2015.
