= Almería (Congress of Deputies constituency) =

Electoral constituency in Spain

Coordinates: 37°10′N 2°20′W

- Congress of Deputies; Electoral constituency
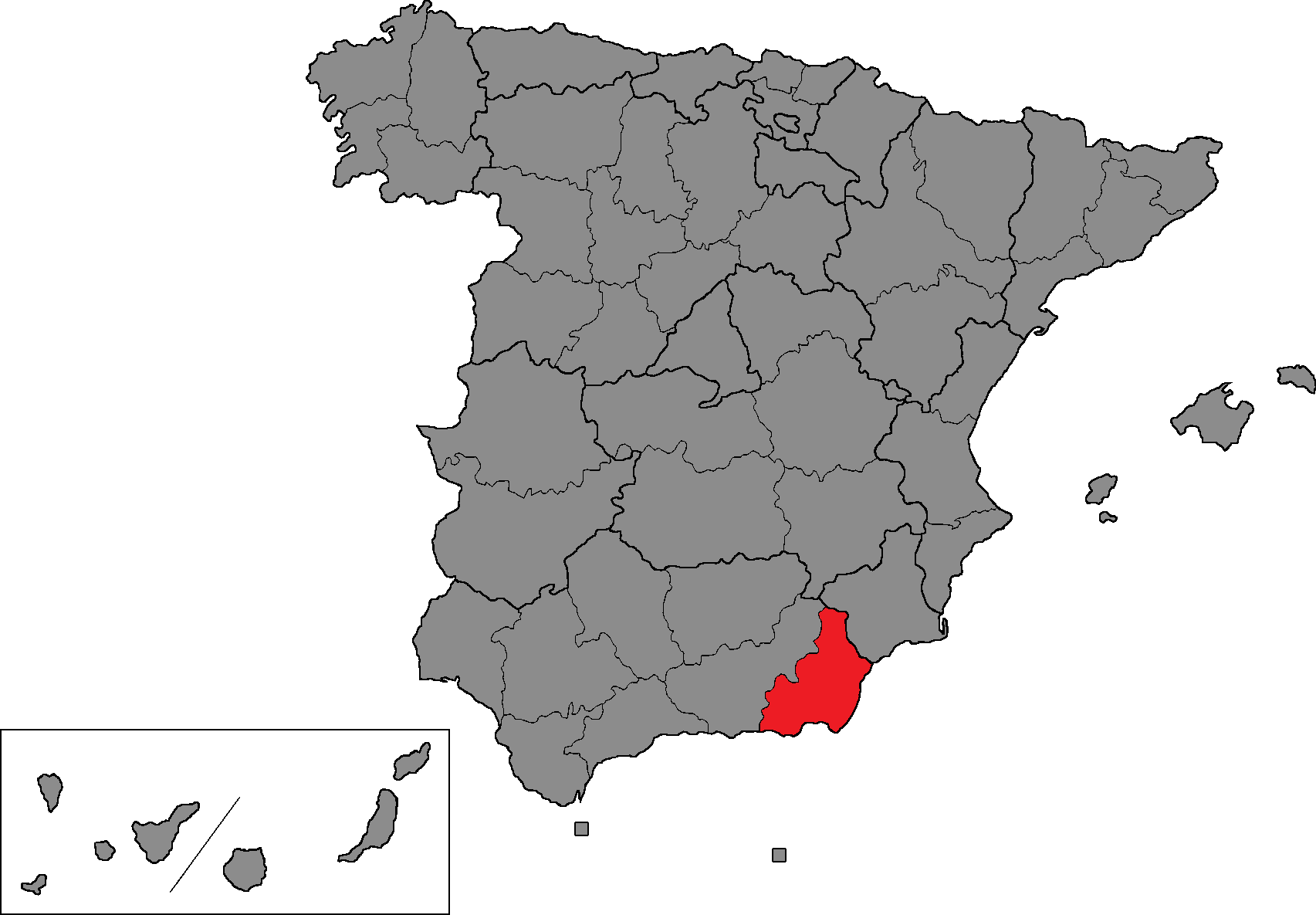
- Location of Almería within Spain
- Province: Almería
- Autonomous community: Andalusia
- Population: ▲763,030 (2024)
- Electorate: ▲516,114 (2023)
- Major settlements: Almería, Roquetas de Mar, El Ejido

Current constituency
- Created: 1977
- Seats: 5 (1977–2008); 6 (2008–present)
- Members: PP (3); PSOE (2); Vox (1)

Almería is one of the 52 constituencies represented in the Congress of Deputies, the lower chamber of the Spanish parliament, the Cortes Generales. The constituency (whose boundaries correspond to those of the homonymous province) currently elects six deputies. The electoral system uses the D'Hondt method and closed-list proportional voting, with a minimum threshold of three percent.

== Electoral system ==
The constituency was created as per the Political Reform Law and was first contested in the 1977 general election. The Law provided for the provinces of Spain to be established as multi-member districts in the Congress of Deputies, with this regulation being maintained under the Spanish Constitution of 1978. Additionally, the Constitution requires for any modification of the provincial limits to be approved under an organic law, needing an absolute majority in the Cortes Generales.

Voting is based on universal suffrage, comprising all Spanish nationals over 18 years of age with full political rights, provided that they have not been deprived of the right to vote by a final sentence. The only exception was in 1977, when this was limited to nationals over 21 years of age and in full enjoyment of their political and civil rights. Amendments in 2011 required non-resident citizens to apply for voting, a system known as "begged" voting (Spanish: Voto rogado). which was abolished in 2022. Further, amendments in 2018 granted the right to vote to those legally incapacitated. The Congress of Deputies has a minimum of 300 and a maximum of 400 seats, with electoral provisions fixing its size at 350. Of these, 348 are elected in 50 multi-member constituencies corresponding to the provinces of Spain—each of which is assigned an initial minimum of two seats and the remaining 248 distributed in proportion to population—using the D'Hondt method and closed-list proportional voting, with a three percent-threshold of valid votes (including blank ballots) in each constituency. The remaining two seats are allocated to Ceuta and Melilla as single-member districts elected by plurality voting. The use of this electoral method may result in a higher effective threshold depending on district magnitude and vote distribution. The law does not provide for by-elections to fill vacant seats; instead, any vacancies arising after the proclamation of candidates and during the legislative term are filled by the next candidates on the party lists or, when required, by designated substitutes.

The electoral law allows for parties and federations registered in the interior ministry, alliances and groupings of electors to present lists of candidates. Parties and federations intending to form an alliance are required to inform the relevant electoral commission within 10 days of the election call—15 before 1985—whereas groupings of electors need to secure the signature of at least one percent of the electorate in the constituencies for which they seek election—one permille of the electorate, with a compulsory minimum of 500 signatures, until 1985—disallowing electors from signing for more than one list. Also since 2011, parties, federations or alliances that have not obtained a mandate in either chamber of the Cortes at the preceding election are required to secure the signature of at least 0.1 percent of electors in the aforementioned constituencies. Amendments in 2007 required a balanced composition of men and women in the electoral lists, so that candidates of either sex made up at least 40 percent of the total composition; further amendments in 2024 required the use of a zipper system.

== Deputies ==
Deputies 1977–present
Key to parties Podemos PSOE Cs UCD PP CP AP Vox
| Legislature | Election | Distribution |
| Constituent | 1977 | 2 / 3 |
| 1st | 1979 | 2 / 3 |
| 2nd | 1982 | 4 / 1 |
| 3rd | 1986 | 4 / 1 |
| 4th | 1989 | 4 / 1 |
| 5th | 1993 | 3 / 2 |
| 6th | 1996 | 3 / 2 |
| 7th | 2000 | 2 / 3 |
| 8th | 2004 | 3 / 2 |
| 9th | 2008 | 3 / 3 |
| 10th | 2011 | 2 / 4 |
| 11th | 2015 | 1 / 2 / 1 / 2 |
| 12th | 2016 | 2 / 1 / 3 |
| 13th | 2019 (Apr) | 2 / 1 / 2 / 1 |
| 14th | 2019 (Nov) | 2 / 2 / 2 |
| 15th | 2023 | 2 / 3 / 1 |

== General elections ==
=== 2026 ===
Summary of the 29 November 2026 Congress of Deputies election results in Almería
| Parties and alliances | Popular vote | | | Seats | |
| Parties and alliances | Votes | % | ±pp | Total | +/− |
|---|---|---|---|---|---|
| People's Party (PP) | | | | | |
| Spanish Socialist Workers' Party (PSOE) | | | | | |
| Vox (Vox) | | | | | |
| Broad Front (FA)^{1} | | | n/a | | |
| We Can (Podemos)^{1} | | | n/a | | |
| Animalist Party with the Environment (PACMA) | | | | | |
| Workers' Front (FO) | | | | | |
| For a Fairer World (M+J) | | | | | |
| The Party is Over (SALF) | | | New | | |
| Forward Andalusia (Adelante Andalucía) | | | New | | |
| Blank Seats to Leave Empty Seats (EB) | | | New | | |
| Communist Party of the Workers of Spain (PCTE) | | | New | | |
| Blank ballots | | | | | |
| Total | | | | 6 | ±0 |
| Valid votes | | | | | |
| Invalid votes | | | | | |
| Votes cast / turnout | | | | | |
| Abstentions | | | | | |
| Registered voters | 541,093 | | | | |
Sources
Footnotes: ^{1} Within the Unite Andalusia alliance in the 2023 election.

=== 2023 ===
Summary of the 23 July 2023 Congress of Deputies election results in Almería
| Parties and alliances | Popular vote | | | Seats | |
| Parties and alliances | Votes | % | ±pp | Total | +/− |
|---|---|---|---|---|---|
| People's Party (PP) | 131,524 | 40.94 | +15.12 | 3 | +1 |
| Spanish Socialist Workers' Party (PSOE) | 93,282 | 29.04 | –0.49 | 2 | ±0 |
| Vox (Vox) | 68,364 | 21.28 | –5.41 | 1 | –1 |
| Unite Andalusia (Sumar)^{1} | 21,485 | 6.69 | –1.38 | 0 | ±0 |
| Animalist Party with the Environment (PACMA)^{2} | 1,962 | 0.61 | –0.24 | 0 | ±0 |
| People from Almería–Regionalists for Almería (ALM) | 874 | 0.27 | New | 0 | ±0 |
| Workers' Front (FO) | 500 | 0.16 | New | 0 | ±0 |
| For a Fairer World (PUM+J) | 371 | 0.12 | ±0.00 | 0 | ±0 |
| Free (LB) | 210 | 0.07 | New | 0 | ±0 |
| Zero Cuts (Recortes Cero) | 206 | 0.06 | –0.06 | 0 | ±0 |
| Blank ballots | 2,464 | 0.77 | –0.11 | | |
| Total | 321,242 | | | 6 | ±0 |
| Valid votes | 321,242 | 99.02 | ±0.00 | | |
| Invalid votes | 3,163 | 0.98 | ±0.00 | | |
| Votes cast / turnout | 324,405 | 62.86 | +2.10 | | |
| Abstentions | 191,709 | 37.14 | –2.10 | | |
| Registered voters | 516,114 | | | | |
Sources
Footnotes: ^{1} Unite results are compared to United We Can totals in the November 2019 election.; ^{2} Animalist Party with the Environment results are compared to Animalist Party Against Mistreatment of Animals totals in the November 2019 election.

=== November 2019 ===
Summary of the 10 November 2019 Congress of Deputies election results in Almería
| Parties and alliances | Popular vote | | | Seats | |
| Parties and alliances | Votes | % | ±pp | Total | +/− |
|---|---|---|---|---|---|
| Spanish Socialist Workers' Party (PSOE) | 89,295 | 29.53 | –0.62 | 2 | ±0 |
| Vox (Vox) | 80,714 | 26.69 | +7.60 | 2 | +1 |
| People's Party (PP) | 78,072 | 25.82 | +3.28 | 2 | ±0 |
| United We Can (Podemos–IULV–CA) | 24,400 | 8.07 | –0.75 | 0 | ±0 |
| Citizens–Party of the Citizenry (Cs) | 22,835 | 7.55 | –9.60 | 0 | –1 |
| Animalist Party Against Mistreatment of Animals (PACMA) | 2,582 | 0.85 | –0.20 | 0 | ±0 |
| Blank Seats (EB) | 513 | 0.17 | +0.01 | 0 | ±0 |
| For a Fairer World (PUM+J) | 371 | 0.12 | +0.02 | 0 | ±0 |
| Zero Cuts–Green Group (Recortes Cero–GV) | 360 | 0.12 | –0.01 | 0 | ±0 |
| Andalusia by Herself (AxSí) | 318 | 0.11 | New | 0 | ±0 |
| Communist Party of the Andalusian People (PCPA) | 303 | 0.10 | –0.01 | 0 | ±0 |
| Blank ballots | 2,661 | 0.88 | +0.18 | | |
| Total | 302,424 | | | 6 | ±0 |
| Valid votes | 302,424 | 99.02 | –0.10 | | |
| Invalid votes | 2,990 | 0.98 | +0.10 | | |
| Votes cast / turnout | 305,414 | 60.76 | –5.37 | | |
| Abstentions | 197,213 | 39.24 | +5.37 | | |
| Registered voters | 502,627 | | | | |

=== April 2019 ===
Summary of the 28 April 2019 Congress of Deputies election results in Almería
| Parties and alliances | Popular vote | | | Seats | |
| Parties and alliances | Votes | % | ±pp | Total | +/− |
|---|---|---|---|---|---|
| Spanish Socialist Workers' Party (PSOE) | 98,924 | 30.15 | +2.44 | 2 | ±0 |
| People's Party (PP) | 73,952 | 22.54 | –20.44 | 2 | –1 |
| Vox (Vox) | 62,648 | 19.09 | +18.95 | 1 | +1 |
| Citizens–Party of the Citizenry (Cs) | 56,268 | 17.15 | +3.49 | 1 | ±0 |
| United We Can (Podemos–IULV–CA–Equo) | 28,934 | 8.82 | –4.41 | 0 | ±0 |
| Animalist Party Against Mistreatment of Animals (PACMA) | 3,452 | 1.05 | +0.17 | 0 | ±0 |
| Blank Seats (EB) | 536 | 0.16 | +0.05 | 0 | ±0 |
| Zero Cuts–Green Group (Recortes Cero–GV) | 412 | 0.13 | +0.02 | 0 | ±0 |
| Communist Party of the Andalusian People (PCPA) | 353 | 0.11 | +0.02 | 0 | ±0 |
| For a Fairer World (PUM+J) | 335 | 0.10 | New | 0 | ±0 |
| Blank ballots | 2,283 | 0.70 | –0.02 | | |
| Total | 328,097 | | | 6 | ±0 |
| Valid votes | 328,097 | 99.12 | –0.13 | | |
| Invalid votes | 2,918 | 0.88 | +0.13 | | |
| Votes cast / turnout | 331,015 | 66.13 | +3.26 | | |
| Abstentions | 169,548 | 33.87 | –3.26 | | |
| Registered voters | 500,563 | | | | |

=== 2016 ===
Summary of the 26 June 2016 Congress of Deputies election results in Almería
| Parties and alliances | Popular vote | | | Seats | |
| Parties and alliances | Votes | % | ±pp | Total | +/− |
|---|---|---|---|---|---|
| People's Party (PP) | 131,801 | 42.98 | +5.02 | 3 | +1 |
| Spanish Socialist Workers' Party (PSOE) | 84,988 | 27.71 | –1.15 | 2 | ±0 |
| Citizens–Party of the Citizenry (C's) | 41,897 | 13.66 | –0.70 | 1 | ±0 |
| United We Can for Andalusia (Podemos–IU–Equo)^{1} | 40,578 | 13.23 | –3.10 | 0 | –1 |
| Animalist Party Against Mistreatment of Animals (PACMA) | 2,689 | 0.88 | +0.19 | 0 | ±0 |
| Union, Progress and Democracy (UPyD) | 684 | 0.22 | –0.27 | 0 | ±0 |
| Vox (Vox) | 435 | 0.14 | –0.04 | 0 | ±0 |
| Blank Seats (EB) | 347 | 0.11 | New | 0 | ±0 |
| Zero Cuts–Green Group (Recortes Cero–GV) | 334 | 0.11 | +0.01 | 0 | ±0 |
| Spanish Phalanx of the CNSO (FE de las JONS) | 323 | 0.11 | ±0.00 | 0 | ±0 |
| Communist Party of the Peoples of Spain (PCPE) | 280 | 0.09 | –0.01 | 0 | ±0 |
| Revolutionary Anticapitalist Left (IZAR) | 105 | 0.03 | New | 0 | ±0 |
| Blank ballots | 2,213 | 0.72 | +0.01 | | |
| Total | 306,674 | | | 6 | ±0 |
| Valid votes | 306,674 | 99.25 | +0.02 | | |
| Invalid votes | 2,315 | 0.75 | –0.02 | | |
| Votes cast / turnout | 308,989 | 62.87 | –0.84 | | |
| Abstentions | 182,507 | 37.13 | +0.84 | | |
| Registered voters | 491,496 | | | | |
Sources
Footnotes: ^{1} United We Can results are compared to the combined totals of We Can and United Left/Greens–Assembly for Andalusia–Popular Unity in Common in the 2015 election.

=== 2015 ===
Summary of the 20 December 2015 Congress of Deputies election results in Almería
| Parties and alliances | Popular vote | | | Seats | |
| Parties and alliances | Votes | % | ±pp | Total | +/− |
|---|---|---|---|---|---|
| People's Party (PP) | 117,635 | 37.96 | –19.64 | 2 | –2 |
| Spanish Socialist Workers' Party (PSOE) | 89,434 | 28.86 | –1.02 | 2 | ±0 |
| Citizens–Party of the Citizenry (C's) | 44,494 | 14.36 | New | 1 | +1 |
| We Can (Podemos) | 39,780 | 12.84 | New | 1 | +1 |
| United Left/Greens–Assembly for Andalusia–Popular Unity (IULV–CA–UPeC) | 10,828 | 3.49 | –1.77 | 0 | ±0 |
| Animalist Party Against Mistreatment of Animals (PACMA) | 2,126 | 0.69 | New | 0 | ±0 |
| Union, Progress and Democracy (UPyD) | 1,532 | 0.49 | –3.42 | 0 | ±0 |
| Vox (Vox) | 558 | 0.18 | New | 0 | ±0 |
| Spanish Phalanx of the CNSO (FE de las JONS) | 343 | 0.11 | New | 0 | ±0 |
| Communist Party of the Peoples of Spain (PCPE) | 318 | 0.10 | New | 0 | ±0 |
| Zero Cuts–Green Group (Recortes Cero–GV) | 297 | 0.10 | New | 0 | ±0 |
| For a Fairer World (PUM+J) | 176 | 0.06 | New | 0 | ±0 |
| National Democracy (DN) | 164 | 0.05 | –0.11 | 0 | ±0 |
| Blank ballots | 2,211 | 0.71 | –0.41 | | |
| Total | 309,896 | | | 6 | ±0 |
| Valid votes | 309,896 | 99.23 | +0.05 | | |
| Invalid votes | 2,419 | 0.77 | –0.05 | | |
| Votes cast / turnout | 312,315 | 63.71 | –3.48 | | |
| Abstentions | 177,877 | 36.29 | +3.48 | | |
| Registered voters | 490,192 | | | | |

=== 2011 ===
Summary of the 20 November 2011 Congress of Deputies election results in Almería
| Parties and alliances | Popular vote | | | Seats | |
| Parties and alliances | Votes | % | ±pp | Total | +/− |
|---|---|---|---|---|---|
| People's Party (PP) | 180,249 | 57.60 | +7.72 | 4 | +1 |
| Spanish Socialist Workers' Party (PSOE) | 93,495 | 29.88 | –12.13 | 2 | –1 |
| United Left/The Greens–Assembly for Andalusia: Plural Left (IULV–CA) | 16,445 | 5.26 | +2.57 | 0 | ±0 |
| Union, Progress and Democracy (UPyD) | 12,225 | 3.91 | +3.35 | 0 | ±0 |
| Equo (Equo) | 2,828 | 0.90 | New | 0 | ±0 |
| Andalusian Party (PA)^{1} | 2,659 | 0.85 | +0.31 | 0 | ±0 |
| National Democracy (DN) | 493 | 0.16 | +0.13 | 0 | ±0 |
| Anti-capitalists (Anticapitalistas) | 338 | 0.11 | New | 0 | ±0 |
| Let us Give the Change (DeC) | 270 | 0.09 | New | 0 | ±0 |
| Regionalist Party for Eastern Andalusia (PRAO) | 253 | 0.08 | New | 0 | ±0 |
| Communist Unification of Spain (UCE) | 178 | 0.06 | New | 0 | ±0 |
| Blank ballots | 3,490 | 1.12 | +0.34 | | |
| Total | 312,923 | | | 6 | ±0 |
| Valid votes | 312,923 | 99.18 | –0.37 | | |
| Invalid votes | 2,581 | 0.82 | +0.37 | | |
| Votes cast / turnout | 315,504 | 67.19 | –5.56 | | |
| Abstentions | 154,090 | 32.81 | +5.56 | | |
| Registered voters | 469,594 | | | | |
Sources
Footnotes: ^{1} Andalusian Party results are compared to Andalusian Coalition totals in the 2008 election.

=== 2008 ===
Summary of the 9 March 2008 Congress of Deputies election results in Almería
| Parties and alliances | Popular vote | | | Seats | |
| Parties and alliances | Votes | % | ±pp | Total | +/− |
|---|---|---|---|---|---|
| People's Party (PP) | 162,531 | 49.88 | +5.60 | 3 | +1 |
| Spanish Socialist Workers' Party (PSOE) | 136,887 | 42.01 | –5.68 | 3 | ±0 |
| United Left/The Greens–Assembly for Andalusia–Alternative (IULV–CA) | 8,755 | 2.69 | –0.42 | 0 | ±0 |
| Party of Almería (PdeAL) | 8,451 | 2.59 | New | 0 | ±0 |
| Union, Progress and Democracy (UPyD) | 1,820 | 0.56 | New | 0 | ±0 |
| Andalusian Coalition (CA)^{1} | 1,772 | 0.54 | –2.06 | 0 | ±0 |
| The Greens (Verdes) | 840 | 0.26 | New | 0 | ±0 |
| Anti-Bullfighting Party Against Mistreatment of Animals (PACMA) | 436 | 0.13 | New | 0 | ±0 |
| Social Democratic Party (PSD) | 354 | 0.11 | New | 0 | ±0 |
| Communist Party of the Peoples of Spain (PCPE) | 290 | 0.09 | +0.09 | 0 | ±0 |
| Citizens–Party of the Citizenry (C's) | 211 | 0.06 | New | 0 | ±0 |
| For a Fairer World (PUM+J) | 188 | 0.06 | New | 0 | ±0 |
| Spanish Phalanx of the CNSO (FE de las JONS) | 159 | 0.05 | –0.01 | 0 | ±0 |
| Humanist Party (PH) | 126 | 0.04 | –0.03 | 0 | ±0 |
| Democratic and Social Centre (CDS) | 114 | 0.03 | –0.05 | 0 | ±0 |
| National Democracy (DN) | 105 | 0.03 | –0.01 | 0 | ±0 |
| Family and Life Party (PFyV) | 102 | 0.03 | –0.03 | 0 | ±0 |
| Spain 2000 (E–2000) | 91 | 0.03 | New | 0 | ±0 |
| National Alliance (AN) | 44 | 0.01 | New | 0 | ±0 |
| Spanish Alternative (AES) | 42 | 0.01 | New | 0 | ±0 |
| Blank ballots | 2,528 | 0.78 | –0.59 | | |
| Total | 325,846 | | | 6 | +1 |
| Valid votes | 325,846 | 99.55 | +0.06 | | |
| Invalid votes | 1,486 | 0.45 | –0.06 | | |
| Votes cast / turnout | 327,332 | 72.75 | +0.81 | | |
| Abstentions | 122,583 | 27.25 | –0.81 | | |
| Registered voters | 449,915 | | | | |
Sources
Footnotes: ^{1} Andalusian Coalition results are compared to the combined totals of Andalusian Party and Socialist Party of Andalusia in the 2004 election.

=== 2004 ===
Summary of the 14 March 2004 Congress of Deputies election results in Almería
| Parties and alliances | Popular vote | | | Seats | |
| Parties and alliances | Votes | % | ±pp | Total | +/− |
|---|---|---|---|---|---|
| Spanish Socialist Workers' Party (PSOE) | 145,868 | 47.69 | +5.43 | 3 | +1 |
| People's Party (PP) | 135,434 | 44.28 | –4.39 | 2 | –1 |
| United Left/The Greens–Assembly for Andalusia (IULV–CA) | 9,522 | 3.11 | –1.11 | 0 | ±0 |
| Andalusian Party (PA) | 7,190 | 2.35 | –0.01 | 0 | ±0 |
| Left Assembly–Initiative for Andalusia (A–IZ) | 901 | 0.29 | New | 0 | ±0 |
| Socialist Party of Andalusia (PSA) | 773 | 0.25 | New | 0 | ±0 |
| Citizens for Blank Votes (CenB) | 273 | 0.09 | New | 0 | ±0 |
| Democratic and Social Centre (CDS) | 257 | 0.08 | +0.01 | 0 | ±0 |
| Humanist Party (PH) | 205 | 0.07 | +0.01 | 0 | ±0 |
| Family and Life Party (PFyV) | 172 | 0.06 | New | 0 | ±0 |
| Spanish Phalanx of the CNSO (FE de las JONS)^{1} | 171 | 0.06 | +0.01 | 0 | ±0 |
| The Phalanx (FE) | 138 | 0.05 | –0.01 | 0 | ±0 |
| Spanish Democratic Party (PADE) | 135 | 0.04 | +0.01 | 0 | ±0 |
| National Democracy (DN) | 128 | 0.04 | New | 0 | ±0 |
| Andalusia Assembly (A) | 126 | 0.04 | +0.01 | 0 | ±0 |
| Party of Precarious Workers (PTPRE) | 122 | 0.04 | New | 0 | ±0 |
| Republican Left (IR) | 116 | 0.04 | New | 0 | ±0 |
| Republican Social Movement (MSR) | 108 | 0.04 | New | 0 | ±0 |
| Communist Party of the Peoples of Spain (PCPE) | 0 | 0.00 | New | 0 | ±0 |
| Blank ballots | 4,197 | 1.37 | –0.04 | | |
| Total | 305,836 | | | 5 | ±0 |
| Valid votes | 305,836 | 99.49 | +0.08 | | |
| Invalid votes | 1,553 | 0.51 | –0.08 | | |
| Votes cast / turnout | 307,389 | 71.94 | +3.80 | | |
| Abstentions | 119,921 | 28.06 | –3.80 | | |
| Registered voters | 427,310 | | | | |
Sources
Footnotes: ^{1} Spanish Phalanx of the CNSO results are compared to Independent Spanish Phalanx–Phalanx 2000 totals in the 2000 election.

=== 2000 ===
Summary of the 12 March 2000 Congress of Deputies election results in Almería
| Parties and alliances | Popular vote | | | Seats | |
| Parties and alliances | Votes | % | ±pp | Total | +/− |
|---|---|---|---|---|---|
| People's Party (PP) | 135,531 | 48.67 | +8.46 | 3 | +1 |
| Spanish Socialist Workers' Party–Progressives (PSOE–p) | 117,685 | 42.26 | –4.84 | 2 | –1 |
| United Left/The Greens–Assembly for Andalusia (IULV–CA) | 11,749 | 4.22 | –5.69 | 0 | ±0 |
| Andalusian Party (PA) | 6,569 | 2.36 | +0.71 | 0 | ±0 |
| Almerian Regionalist Union (URAL) | 838 | 0.30 | New | 0 | ±0 |
| Andalusian Left (IA) | 638 | 0.23 | New | 0 | ±0 |
| Andalusian Nation (NA) | 320 | 0.11 | –0.01 | 0 | ±0 |
| Democratic and Social Centre–Centrist Union (CDS–UC) | 206 | 0.07 | +0.01 | 0 | ±0 |
| Spain 2000 Platform (ES2000) | 189 | 0.07 | New | 0 | ±0 |
| Humanist Party (PH) | 180 | 0.06 | ±0.00 | 0 | ±0 |
| Natural Law Party (PLN) | 164 | 0.06 | New | 0 | ±0 |
| The Phalanx (FE) | 161 | 0.06 | New | 0 | ±0 |
| Independent Spanish Phalanx–Phalanx 2000 (FEI–FE 2000) | 137 | 0.05 | New | 0 | ±0 |
| Andalusia Assembly (A) | 83 | 0.03 | New | 0 | ±0 |
| Spanish Democratic Party (PADE) | 81 | 0.03 | New | 0 | ±0 |
| Blank ballots | 3,931 | 1.41 | +0.75 | | |
| Total | 278,462 | | | 5 | ±0 |
| Valid votes | 278,462 | 99.41 | –0.09 | | |
| Invalid votes | 1,650 | 0.59 | +0.09 | | |
| Votes cast / turnout | 280,112 | 68.14 | –9.04 | | |
| Abstentions | 130,953 | 31.86 | +9.04 | | |
| Registered voters | 411,065 | | | | |

=== 1996 ===
Summary of the 3 March 1996 Congress of Deputies election results in Almería
| Parties and alliances | Popular vote | | | Seats | |
| Parties and alliances | Votes | % | ±pp | Total | +/− |
|---|---|---|---|---|---|
| Spanish Socialist Workers' Party of Andalusia (PSOE–A) | 135,789 | 47.10 | –0.83 | 3 | ±0 |
| People's Party (PP) | 115,925 | 40.21 | +2.87 | 2 | ±0 |
| United Left/The Greens–Assembly for Andalusia (IULV–CA) | 28,580 | 9.91 | +0.41 | 0 | ±0 |
| Andalusian Party (PA)^{1} | 4,754 | 1.65 | –0.06 | 0 | ±0 |
| Andalusian Nation (NA) | 344 | 0.12 | New | 0 | ±0 |
| Communist Party of the Andalusian People (PCPA) | 296 | 0.10 | New | 0 | ±0 |
| Authentic Spanish Phalanx (FEA) | 205 | 0.07 | New | 0 | ±0 |
| Humanist Party (PH) | 182 | 0.06 | New | 0 | ±0 |
| Centrist Union (UC) | 180 | 0.06 | –1.30 | 0 | ±0 |
| Workers' Revolutionary Party (PRT) | 152 | 0.05 | New | 0 | ±0 |
| Blank ballots | 1,890 | 0.66 | +0.22 | | |
| Total | 288,297 | | | 5 | ±0 |
| Valid votes | 288,297 | 99.50 | –0.06 | | |
| Invalid votes | 1,436 | 0.50 | +0.06 | | |
| Votes cast / turnout | 289,733 | 77.18 | +1.41 | | |
| Abstentions | 85,642 | 22.82 | –1.41 | | |
| Registered voters | 375,375 | | | | |
Sources
Footnotes: ^{1} Andalusian Party results are compared to the combined totals of Andalusian Party and Andalusian Progress Party in the 1993 election.

=== 1993 ===
Summary of the 6 June 1993 Congress of Deputies election results in Almería
| Parties and alliances | Popular vote | | | Seats | |
| Parties and alliances | Votes | % | ±pp | Total | +/− |
|---|---|---|---|---|---|
| Spanish Socialist Workers' Party of Andalusia (PSOE–A) | 126,242 | 47.93 | –4.74 | 3 | –1 |
| People's Party (PP) | 98,341 | 37.34 | +13.91 | 2 | +1 |
| United Left–Assembly for Andalusia (IU–CA) | 25,020 | 9.50 | +0.98 | 0 | ±0 |
| Democratic and Social Centre (CDS) | 3,585 | 1.36 | –7.54 | 0 | ±0 |
| Andalusian Party (PA) | 3,551 | 1.35 | –0.98 | 0 | ±0 |
| Liberal Independent Group (GIL) | 1,475 | 0.56 | New | 0 | ±0 |
| The Greens of Andalusia (Verdes)^{1} | 1,391 | 0.53 | –0.41 | 0 | ±0 |
| Andalusian Progress Party (PAP) | 952 | 0.36 | New | 0 | ±0 |
| The Ecologists (LE) | 487 | 0.18 | New | 0 | ±0 |
| Integration Party for Almeria and its Peoples (PIAP) | 466 | 0.18 | New | 0 | ±0 |
| Ruiz-Mateos Group–European Democratic Alliance (ARM–ADE) | 375 | 0.14 | –1.76 | 0 | ±0 |
| Spanish Phalanx of the CNSO (FE–JONS) | 131 | 0.05 | New | 0 | ±0 |
| Natural Law Party (PLN) | 106 | 0.04 | New | 0 | ±0 |
| Coalition for a New Socialist Party (CNPS)^{2} | 101 | 0.04 | –0.04 | 0 | ±0 |
| Communist Unification of Spain (UCE) | 0 | 0.00 | New | 0 | ±0 |
| Blank ballots | 1,153 | 0.44 | +0.08 | | |
| Total | 263,376 | | | 5 | ±0 |
| Valid votes | 263,376 | 99.56 | +0.30 | | |
| Invalid votes | 1,167 | 0.44 | –0.30 | | |
| Votes cast / turnout | 264,543 | 75.77 | +7.74 | | |
| Abstentions | 84,615 | 24.23 | –7.74 | | |
| Registered voters | 349,158 | | | | |
Sources
Footnotes: ^{1} The Greens of Andalusia results are compared to The Greens–Green List totals in the 1989 election.; ^{2} Coalition for a New Socialist Party results are compared to Alliance for the Republic totals in the 1989 election.

=== 1989 ===
Summary of the 29 October 1989 Congress of Deputies election results in Almería
| Parties and alliances | Popular vote | | | Seats | |
| Parties and alliances | Votes | % | ±pp | Total | +/− |
|---|---|---|---|---|---|
| Spanish Socialist Workers' Party of Andalusia (PSOE–A) | 115,587 | 52.67 | –0.46 | 4 | ±0 |
| People's Party (PP)^{1} | 51,421 | 23.43 | –2.48 | 1 | ±0 |
| Democratic and Social Centre (CDS) | 19,523 | 8.90 | –0.13 | 0 | ±0 |
| United Left–Assembly for Andalusia (IU–CA) | 18,697 | 8.52 | +3.28 | 0 | ±0 |
| Andalusian Party (PA) | 5,116 | 2.33 | +0.85 | 0 | ±0 |
| Ruiz-Mateos Group (Ruiz-Mateos) | 4,176 | 1.90 | New | 0 | ±0 |
| The Greens–Green List (LV–LV) | 2,062 | 0.94 | New | 0 | ±0 |
| Workers' Party of Spain–Communist Unity (PTE–UC)^{2} | 701 | 0.32 | –0.51 | 0 | ±0 |
| Workers' Socialist Party (PST) | 650 | 0.30 | New | 0 | ±0 |
| Communist Party of the Andalusian People (PCPA) | 274 | 0.12 | New | 0 | ±0 |
| Alliance for the Republic (AxR)^{3} | 184 | 0.08 | –0.05 | 0 | ±0 |
| Humanist Party (PH) | 142 | 0.06 | New | 0 | ±0 |
| Centrist Unity–Democratic Spanish Party (PED) | 111 | 0.05 | New | 0 | ±0 |
| Blank ballots | 791 | 0.36 | +0.01 | | |
| Total | 219,435 | | | 5 | ±0 |
| Valid votes | 219,435 | 99.26 | +0.47 | | |
| Invalid votes | 1,646 | 0.74 | –0.47 | | |
| Votes cast / turnout | 221,081 | 68.03 | +0.23 | | |
| Abstentions | 103,905 | 31.97 | –0.23 | | |
| Registered voters | 324,986 | | | | |
Sources
Footnotes: ^{1} People's Party results are compared to People's Coalition totals in the 1986 election.; ^{2} Workers' Party of Spain–Communist Unity results are compared to Communists' Unity Board totals in the 1986 election.; ^{3} Alliance for the Republic results are compared to Internationalist Socialist Workers' Party totals in the 1986 election.

=== 1986 ===
Summary of the 22 June 1986 Congress of Deputies election results in Almería
| Parties and alliances | Popular vote | | | Seats | |
| Parties and alliances | Votes | % | ±pp | Total | +/− |
|---|---|---|---|---|---|
| Spanish Socialist Workers' Party (PSOE) | 111,617 | 53.13 | –4.64 | 4 | ±0 |
| People's Coalition (AP–PDP–PL)^{1} | 54,433 | 25.91 | +2.65 | 1 | ±0 |
| Democratic and Social Centre (CDS) | 18,960 | 9.03 | +7.26 | 0 | ±0 |
| United Left (IU)^{2} | 11,010 | 5.24 | +2.59 | 0 | ±0 |
| Democratic Reformist Party (PRD) | 5,565 | 2.65 | New | 0 | ±0 |
| Andalusian Party (PA) | 3,109 | 1.48 | +0.25 | 0 | ±0 |
| Communists' Unity Board (MUC) | 1,741 | 0.83 | New | 0 | ±0 |
| Socialist Party of the Andalusian People (PSPA) | 1,035 | 0.49 | New | 0 | ±0 |
| Republican Popular Unity (UPR)^{3} | 707 | 0.34 | +0.18 | 0 | ±0 |
| Communist Unification of Spain (UCE) | 446 | 0.21 | +0.05 | 0 | ±0 |
| Spanish Phalanx of the CNSO (FE–JONS) | 428 | 0.20 | New | 0 | ±0 |
| Internationalist Socialist Workers' Party (POSI) | 282 | 0.13 | New | 0 | ±0 |
| Blank ballots | 734 | 0.35 | –0.32 | | |
| Total | 210,067 | | | 5 | ±0 |
| Valid votes | 210,067 | 98.79 | +0.99 | | |
| Invalid votes | 2,570 | 1.21 | –0.99 | | |
| Votes cast / turnout | 212,637 | 67.80 | –9.02 | | |
| Abstentions | 101,007 | 32.20 | +9.02 | | |
| Registered voters | 313,644 | | | | |
Sources
Footnotes: ^{1} People's Coalition results are compared to People's Alliance–People's Democratic Party totals in the 1982 election.; ^{2} United Left results are compared to Communist Party of Andalusia totals in the 1982 election.; ^{3} Republican Popular Unity results are compared to Communist Party of Spain (Marxist–Leninist) totals in the 1982 election.

=== 1982 ===
Summary of the 28 October 1982 Congress of Deputies election results in Almería
| Parties and alliances | Popular vote | | | Seats | |
| Parties and alliances | Votes | % | ±pp | Total | +/− |
|---|---|---|---|---|---|
| Spanish Socialist Workers' Party of Andalusia (PSA–PSOE) | 119,903 | 57.77 | +20.71 | 4 | +2 |
| People's Alliance–People's Democratic Party (AP–PDP)^{1} | 48,280 | 23.26 | +18.85 | 1 | +1 |
| Union of the Democratic Centre (UCD) | 23,294 | 11.22 | –32.99 | 0 | –3 |
| Communist Party of Andalusia (PCA–PCE) | 5,504 | 2.65 | –4.75 | 0 | ±0 |
| Democratic and Social Centre (CDS) | 3,666 | 1.77 | New | 0 | ±0 |
| Socialist Party of Andalusia–Andalusian Party (PSA–PA) | 2,558 | 1.23 | –1.54 | 0 | ±0 |
| New Force (FN)^{2} | 1,251 | 0.60 | –1.09 | 0 | ±0 |
| Communist Unity Candidacy (CUC) | 476 | 0.23 | New | 0 | ±0 |
| Spanish Solidarity (SE) | 351 | 0.17 | New | 0 | ±0 |
| Communist Party of Spain (Marxist–Leninist) (PCE (m–l)) | 328 | 0.16 | New | 0 | ±0 |
| Communist Unification of Spain (UCE) | 323 | 0.16 | New | 0 | ±0 |
| Falangist Movement of Spain (MFE) | 235 | 0.11 | New | 0 | ±0 |
| Communist Movement of Andalusia (MCA) | 0 | 0.00 | –0.40 | 0 | ±0 |
| Revolutionary Communist League (LCR) | 0 | 0.00 | New | 0 | ±0 |
| Socialist Party (PS) | 0 | 0.00 | New | 0 | ±0 |
| Blank ballots | 1,393 | 0.67 | +0.47 | | |
| Total | 207,562 | | | 5 | ±0 |
| Valid votes | 207,562 | 97.80 | –1.34 | | |
| Invalid votes | 4,670 | 2.20 | +1.34 | | |
| Votes cast / turnout | 212,232 | 76.82 | +10.52 | | |
| Abstentions | 64,044 | 23.18 | –10.52 | | |
| Registered voters | 276,276 | | | | |
Sources
Footnotes: ^{1} People's Alliance–People's Democratic Party results are compared to Democratic Coalition totals in the 1979 election.; ^{2} New Force results are compared to National Union totals in the 1979 election.

=== 1979 ===
Summary of the 1 March 1979 Congress of Deputies election results in Almería
| Parties and alliances | Popular vote | | | Seats | |
| Parties and alliances | Votes | % | ±pp | Total | +/− |
|---|---|---|---|---|---|
| Union of the Democratic Centre (UCD) | 80,854 | 44.21 | –5.48 | 3 | ±0 |
| Spanish Socialist Workers' Party (PSOE)^{1} | 67,782 | 37.06 | +6.54 | 2 | ±0 |
| Communist Party of Spain (PCE) | 13,534 | 7.40 | +0.96 | 0 | ±0 |
| Democratic Coalition (CD)^{2} | 8,067 | 4.41 | –3.63 | 0 | ±0 |
| Socialist Party of Andalusia–Andalusian Party (PSA–PA) | 5,074 | 2.77 | New | 0 | ±0 |
| National Union (UN)^{3} | 3,097 | 1.69 | +1.27 | 0 | ±0 |
| Liberal Party (PL) | 1,484 | 0.81 | New | 0 | ±0 |
| Party of Labour of Spain (PTE)^{4} | 872 | 0.48 | +0.06 | 0 | ±0 |
| Communist Movement–Organization of Communist Left (MC–OIC) | 731 | 0.40 | New | 0 | ±0 |
| Republican Left (IR) | 413 | 0.23 | New | 0 | ±0 |
| Workers' Revolutionary Organization (ORT) | 302 | 0.17 | New | 0 | ±0 |
| Union for the Freedom of Speech (ULE) | 185 | 0.10 | New | 0 | ±0 |
| Carlist Party (PC) | 144 | 0.08 | New | 0 | ±0 |
| Blank ballots | 360 | 0.20 | +0.01 | | |
| Total | 182,899 | | | 5 | ±0 |
| Valid votes | 182,899 | 99.14 | –0.24 | | |
| Invalid votes | 1,590 | 0.86 | +0.24 | | |
| Votes cast / turnout | 184,489 | 66.30 | –11.36 | | |
| Abstentions | 93,791 | 33.70 | +11.36 | | |
| Registered voters | 278,280 | | | | |
Sources
Footnotes: ^{1} Spanish Socialist Workers' Party results are compared to the combined totals of Spanish Socialist Workers' Party and People's Socialist Party–Socialist Unity in the 1977 election.; ^{2} Democratic Coalition results are compared to People's Alliance totals in the 1977 election.; ^{3} National Union results are compared to National Alliance July 18 totals in the 1977 election.; ^{4} Party of Labour of Spain results are compared to Democratic Left Front totals in the 1977 election.

=== 1977 ===
Summary of the 15 June 1977 Congress of Deputies election results in Almería
| Parties and alliances | Popular vote | | | Seats | |
| Parties and alliances | Votes | % | ±pp | Total | +/− |
|---|---|---|---|---|---|
| Union of the Democratic Centre (UCD) | 92,019 | 49.69 | n/a | 3 | n/a |
| Spanish Socialist Workers' Party (PSOE) | 50,723 | 27.39 | n/a | 2 | n/a |
| People's Alliance (AP) | 14,886 | 8.04 | n/a | 0 | n/a |
| Communist Party of Spain (PCE) | 11,926 | 6.44 | n/a | 0 | n/a |
| People's Socialist Party–Socialist Unity (PSP–US) | 5,789 | 3.13 | n/a | 0 | n/a |
| Federation of Christian Democracy (FPD–ID) | 5,553 | 3.00 | n/a | 0 | n/a |
| Democratic Socialist Alliance (ASDCI) | 892 | 0.48 | n/a | 0 | n/a |
| National Alliance July 18 (AN18) | 775 | 0.42 | n/a | 0 | n/a |
| Spanish Social Reform (RSE) | 771 | 0.42 | n/a | 0 | n/a |
| Democratic Left Front (FDI) | 770 | 0.42 | n/a | 0 | n/a |
| Spanish Phalanx of the CNSO (Authentic) (FE–JONS(A)) | 718 | 0.39 | n/a | 0 | n/a |
| Blank ballots | 360 | 0.19 | n/a | | |
| Total | 185,182 | | | 5 | n/a |
| Valid votes | 185,182 | 99.38 | n/a | | |
| Invalid votes | 1,160 | 0.62 | n/a | | |
| Votes cast / turnout | 186,342 | 77.66 | n/a | | |
| Abstentions | 53,593 | 22.34 | n/a | | |
| Registered voters | 239,935 | | | | |

== Bibliography ==
- Ley 1/1977, de 4 de enero, para la Reforma Política (Fundamental Law 1/1977). Official State Gazette (in Spanish). 4 January 1977. BOE-A-1977-165.
- Real Decreto-ley 20/1977, de 18 de marzo, sobre Normas Electorales (Royal Decree-Law 20/1977). Official State Gazette (in Spanish). 18 March 1977. BOE-A-1977-7445.
- Constitución Española (Constitution). Official State Gazette (in Spanish). 27 December 1978. BOE-A-1978-31229.
- Ley Orgánica 5/1985, de 19 de junio, del Régimen Electoral General (Organic Law 5/1985). Official State Gazette (in Spanish). 19 June 1985. BOE-A-1985-11672.
- Carreras de Odriozola, Albert; Tafunell Sambola, Xavier (2005) [1989]. Estadísticas históricas de España, siglos XIX-XX (PDF) (in Spanish). Vol. 1 (II ed.). Bilbao: Fundación BBVA. pp. 1072–1097. ISBN 84-96515-00-1. Archived from the original (PDF) on 24 September 2015.
