= European Parliament Committee on Industry, Research and Energy =

European Parliament committee

Committee on Industry, Research and Energy
- Abbreviation: ITRE
- Type: Standing committee
- Legislature: European Parliament
- Parliamentary term: 10th European Parliament
- Chair: Borys Budka; EPP, Poland
- Vice-Chairs: Tsvetelina Penkova (S&D); Elena Donazzan (ECR); Giorgio Gori (S&D); Yvan Verougstraete (Renew)
- Members: 90 seats (89 currently listed)
- Political composition: EPP: 24 · S&D: 17 · ECR: 10 · Renew: 10 · PfE: 11 · Greens/EFA: 7 · The Left: 6 · ESN: 3 · NI: 1
- Jurisdiction: Industry, energy, research and innovation, telecommunications, digital infrastructure, cybersecurity, space policy and small and medium-sized enterprises
- Counterpart: Transport, Telecommunications and Energy Council; Competitiveness Council
- Website: Official website

The Committee on Industry, Research and Energy (ITRE) is a standing committee of the European Parliament. It is responsible for energy policy, industrial policy, research and innovation, telecommunications, digital infrastructure, cybersecurity, space policy and measures affecting small and medium-sized enterprises. With 90 seats during the tenth parliamentary term, it is one of Parliament's two largest committees. The official membership page currently lists 89 full members.

== Responsibilities ==
ITRE is responsible for the European Union's industrial, energy, research and technology policies. Its work covers energy security and infrastructure, the internal energy market, renewable energy, energy efficiency, industrial competitiveness, digital connectivity, research programmes and the Union's space activities.

Its remit includes:

- industrial policy, competitiveness and the technological transformation of European industry;
- measures affecting small and medium-sized enterprises;
- the Union's energy policy, including security of supply, energy efficiency and renewable energy;
- the functioning and interconnection of electricity and gas networks;
- nuclear-energy matters governed by the Euratom Treaty, including nuclear safeguards and waste;
- research and innovation policy, including Horizon Europe;
- the activities of the Joint Research Centre;
- telecommunications, electronic communications and digital infrastructure;
- cybersecurity within its areas of competence;
- the digital economy, data infrastructure and emerging technologies;
- the Union's space policy, including Galileo, Copernicus and relations with the European Space Agency; and
- relevant EU agencies and public–private partnerships.

== Energy policy ==
ITRE is Parliament's lead committee for legislation on the internal energy market, renewable energy, energy efficiency, energy infrastructure and security of supply. It has played a central role in measures connected with the European Green Deal, the decarbonisation of the energy system and the reduction of dependence on imported fossil fuels.

Its legislative work includes rules on electricity-market design, energy-performance standards for buildings, renewable-energy targets, energy efficiency, methane emissions, hydrogen markets and cross-border energy networks. The committee also follows the implementation of the REPowerEU plan and the development of energy-storage and grid technologies.

== Industry, research and innovation ==
The committee deals with policies intended to strengthen the competitiveness, resilience and technological capacity of European industry. These include the development of clean technologies, strategic supply chains, access to critical raw materials, industrial decarbonisation and support for small and medium-sized enterprises.

ITRE is also responsible for Parliament's work on the Union's research framework programmes, including Horizon Europe, and for scrutiny of the Joint Research Centre. Its research remit covers scientific cooperation, innovation, technology transfer and the development of research infrastructure.

== Digital and space policy ==
ITRE legislates on telecommunications networks, electronic communications, connectivity, digital infrastructure and cybersecurity in areas falling within its competence. The committee has considered legislation on roaming, broadband deployment, spectrum policy, network security and the regulation of telecommunications markets.

The committee also coordinates Parliament's work on European space policy. It follows the Union Space Programme, satellite-navigation and Earth-observation systems and relations with the European Union Agency for the Space Programme and the European Space Agency.

== Chairs ==
The following table lists the chairs of the committee since 2009.

Name	Political group	Member state	Took office	Left office
Herbert Reul	EPP	Germany	2009	2012
Amalia Sartori	EPP	Italy	2012	2014
Jerzy Buzek	EPP	Poland	2014	2019
Adina-Ioana Vălean	EPP	Romania	July 2019	November 2019
Cristian Bușoi	EPP	Romania	2019	2024
Borys Budka	EPP	Poland	2024	Incumbent

== Members ==
=== 10th Parliament, 2024–2029 ===
The committee has 90 seats; the official membership page currently lists 89 full members. Its composition is shown below, with the chair and vice-chairs indicated in italics.

European People's Party	Progressive Alliance of Socialists and Democrats	European Conservatives and Reformists	Renew Europe
Borys Budka, Poland, Chair; Wouter Beke, Belgium; Hildegard Bentele, Germany; Pilar del Castillo Vera, Spain; Raúl de la Hoz Quintano, Spain; Christian Ehler, Germany; Jan Farský, Czechia; Niels Flemming Hansen, Denmark; Adam Jarubas, Poland; Seán Kelly, Ireland; Willemien Koning, Netherlands; Eszter Lakos, Hungary; Fulvio Martusciello, Italy; Eva Maydell, Bulgaria; Letizia Moratti, Italy; Angelika Niebler, Germany; Mirosława Nykiel, Poland; Virgil-Daniel Popescu, Romania; Jüri Ratas, Estonia; Aura Salla, Finland; Paulius Saudargas, Lithuania; Matej Tonin, Slovenia; Andrea Wechsler, Germany; Angelika Winzig, Austria	Tsvetelina Penkova, Bulgaria, Vice-Chair; Giorgio Gori, Italy, Vice-Chair; Annalisa Corrado, Italy; Matthias Ecke, Germany; Sofie Eriksson, Sweden; Niels Fuglsang, Denmark; Lina Gálvez, Spain; Jens Geier, Germany; Bruno Gonçalves, Portugal; Nicolás González Casares, Spain; Eero Heinäluoma, Finland; Giannis Maniatis, Greece; Dan Nica, Romania; Thomas Pellerin-Carlin, France; Elena Sancho Murillo, Spain; Bruno Tobback, Belgium; Nicola Zingaretti, Italy	Elena Donazzan, Italy, Vice-Chair; Ondřej Krutílek, Czechia; Daniel Obajtek, Poland; Nicola Procaccini, Italy; Diego Solier, Spain; Beata Szydło, Poland; Claudiu-Richard Târziu, Romania; Kris Van Dijck, Belgium; Mariateresa Vivaldini, Italy; Anna Zalewska, Poland	Yvan Verougstraete, Belgium, Vice-Chair; Oihane Agirregoitia Martínez, Spain; João Cotrim de Figueiredo, Portugal; Sigrid Friis, Denmark; Bart Groothuis, Netherlands; Christophe Grudler, France; Ivars Ijabs, Latvia; Michał Kobosko, Poland; Morten Løkkegaard, Denmark; Anna Stürgkh, Austria
Patriots for Europe	Greens–European Free Alliance	The Left	Europe of Sovereign Nations
Majbritt Birkholm, Denmark; Paolo Borchia, Italy; András Gyürk, Hungary; Ondřej Knotek, Czechia; Jana Nagyová, Czechia; Aleksandar Nikolic, France; Aldo Patriciello, Italy; Julie Rechagneux, France; Isabella Tovaglieri, Italy; Ewa Zajączkowska-Hernik, Poland; Auke Zijlstra, Netherlands	Michael Bloss, Germany; Alexandra Geese, Germany; Isabella Lövin, Sweden; Sara Matthieu, Belgium; Ville Niinistö, Finland; Benedetta Scuderi, Italy; Nicolae Ștefănuță, Romania	Rudi Kennes, Belgium; Marina Mesure, France; Nikos Pappas, Greece; Jussi Saramo, Finland; Anthony Smith, France; Dario Tamburrano, Italy	Markus Buchheit, Germany; Sarah Knafo, France; Marcin Sypniewski, Poland
Non-Inscrits			
Diana Iovanovici Șoșoacă, Romania			

==== Substitute members ====
Substitute members of the 10th Parliament (click “show” to expand)

The committee's substitute members are listed below.

European People's Party	Progressive Alliance of Socialists and Democrats	European Conservatives and Reformists	Renew Europe
François-Xavier Bellamy, France; Stefan Berger, Germany; Zala Tomašič, Slovenia; Paulo Cunha, Portugal; Kamila Gasiuk-Pihowicz, Poland; Jens Gieseke, Germany; Michalis Hatzipantelas, Cyprus; Krzysztof Hetman, Poland; Radan Kanev, Bulgaria; Fernando Navarrete Rojas, Spain; Ana Miguel Pedro, Portugal; Massimiliano Salini, Italy; Oliver Schenk, Germany; Susana Solís Pérez, Spain; Davor Ivo Stier, Croatia; Michał Szczerba, Poland; Tomas Tobé, Sweden; Dimitris Tsiodras, Greece; Inese Vaidere, Latvia; Adina Vălean, Romania; Marion Walsmann, Germany; Jörgen Warborn, Sweden; Iuliu Winkler, Romania	Daniel Attard, Malta; Laura Ballarín Cereza, Spain; Delara Burkhardt, Germany; Mohammed Chahim, Netherlands; Christophe Clergeau, France; Andi Cristea, Romania; Sven Mikser, Estonia; Csaba Molnár, Hungary; Dario Nardella, Italy; René Repasi, Germany; Günther Sidl, Austria; Irene Tinagli, Italy; Georgia Tramacere, Italy	Adam Bielan, Poland; Carlo Ciccioli, Italy; Alessandro Ciriani, Italy; Pietro Fiocchi, Italy; Patryk Jaki, Poland; Rihards Kols, Latvia; Lara Magoni, Italy; Marion Maréchal, France; Georgiana Teodorescu, Romania; Francesco Torselli, Italy	Barry Andrews, Ireland; Andreas Glück, Germany; Elisabetta Gualmini, Italy; Martin Hojsík, Slovakia; Katri Kulmuni, Finland; Michael McNamara, Ireland; Marie-Agnes Strack-Zimmermann, Germany; Brigitte van den Berg, Netherlands; Emma Wiesner, Sweden; Sophie Wilmès, Belgium
Patriots for Europe	Greens–European Free Alliance	The Left	Europe of Sovereign Nations
Christophe Bay, France; Barbara Bonte, Belgium; Anna Bryłka, Poland; Mélanie Disdier, France; Tomáš Kubín, Czechia; András László, Hungary; Jorge Martín Frías, Spain; Georg Mayer, Austria; Raffaele Stancanelli, Italy; Petra Steger, Austria; Pierre-Romain Thionnet, France	Damian Boeselager, Germany; Markéta Gregorová, Czechia; Sergey Lagodinsky, Germany; Jutta Paulus, Germany; Virginijus Sinkevičius, Lithuania; Villy Søvndal, Denmark; Marie Toussaint, France	Marc Botenga, Belgium; Per Clausen, Denmark; Hanna Gedin, Sweden; Catarina Martins, Portugal; João Oliveira, Portugal; Gaetano Pedullà, Italy	René Aust, Germany; Petras Gražulis, Lithuania; Petar Volgin, Bulgaria
Non-Inscrits			
Monika Beňová, Slovakia; Thomas Geisel, Germany			

== Research support ==
The committee is supported by the European Parliament's research services and policy departments. They provide studies, briefings and impact assessments on energy, industrial policy, research, digital infrastructure, telecommunications, cybersecurity, space and technological competitiveness.

Research prepared for the committee is published through Parliament's supporting-analyses database and the European Parliament Think Tank.

== See also ==
- Energy policy of the European Union
- European Green Deal
- REPowerEU
- Horizon Europe
- Joint Research Centre
- Digital Single Market
- European Union Agency for the Space Programme
- European Space Agency
- European Parliament Committee on the Internal Market and Consumer Protection
