= 2024 European Parliament election in Spain =

- 9 June 2024

All 61 (Note: Note that while the Treaty of Lisbon initially allocated 54 seats to Spain, it was awarded five additional seats as a result of Brexit, and a further two following a European Council Decision in 2023 increasing the size of the European Parliament to 720 seats.) Spanish seats in the European Parliament
- Opinion polls
- Registered: 38,050,286 ▲2.2%
- Turnout: 17,652,007 (46.4%) ▼14.3 pp
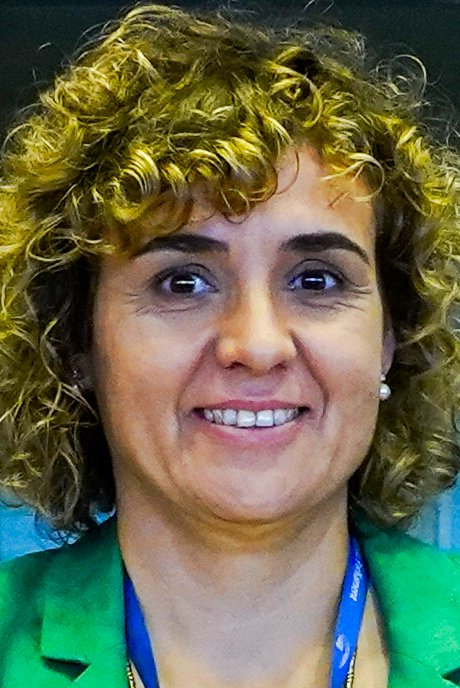

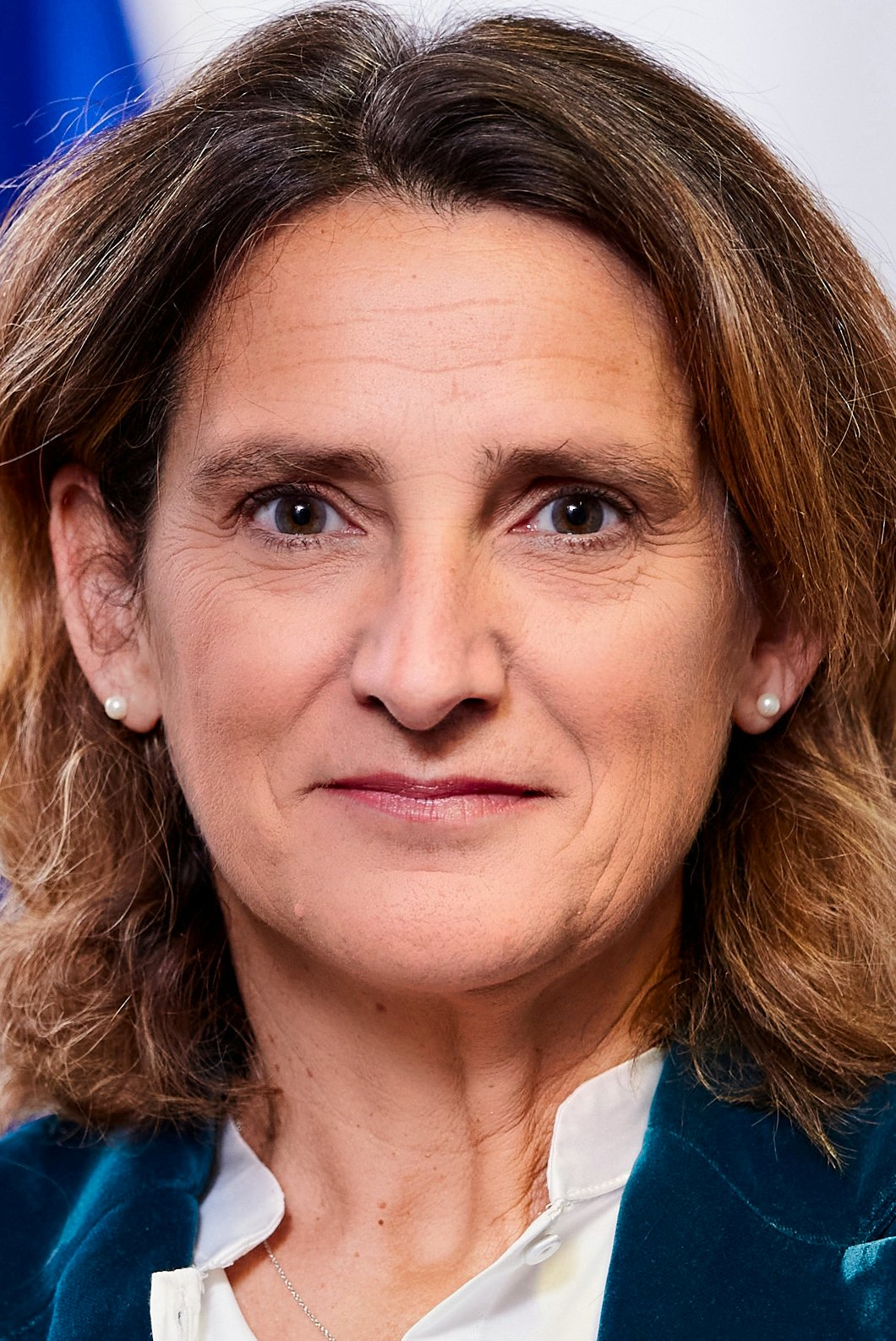

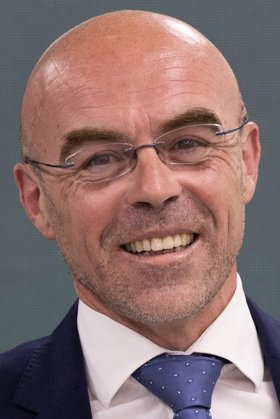

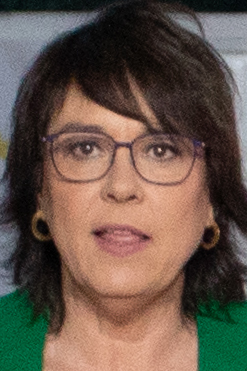

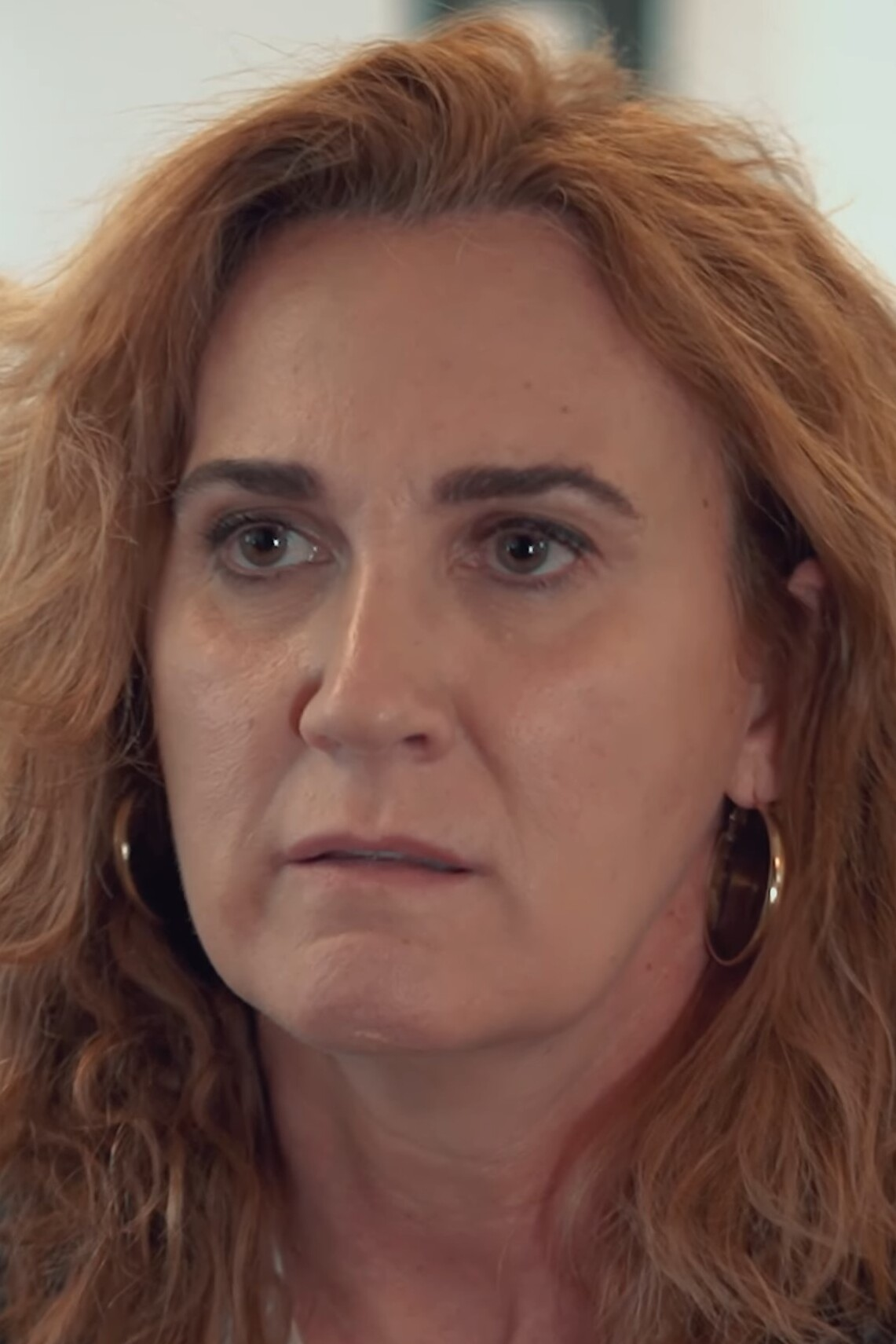

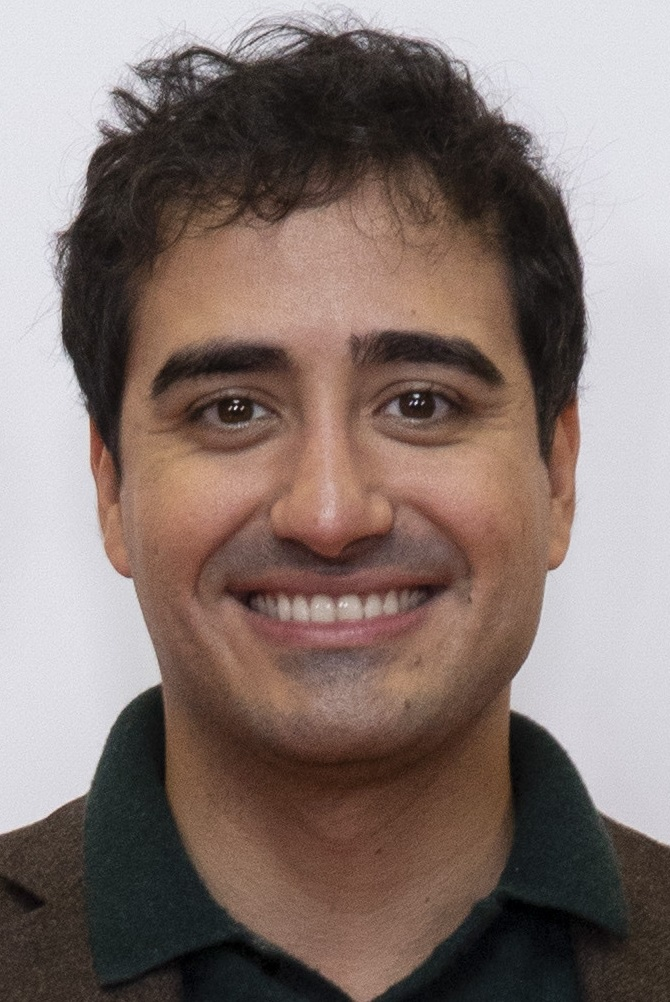
	First party	Second party	Third party
Leader	Dolors Montserrat	Teresa Ribera	Jorge Buxadé
Party	PP	PSOE	Vox
Alliance	EPP	S&D	Patriots
Leader since	1 April 2019	24 April 2024	21 April 2019
Last election	13 seats, 20.2%	21 seats, 32.9%	4 seats, 6.2%
Seats won	22	20	6
Seat change	▲9	▼1	▲2
Popular vote	5,996,627	5,291,102	1,688,255
Percentage	34.2%	30.2%	9.6%
Swing	▲14.0 pp	▼2.7 pp	▲3.4 pp
	Fourth party	Fifth party	Sixth party
Leader	Diana Riba	Estrella Galán	Alvise Pérez
Party	Ahora Repúblicas	Sumar	SALF
Alliance	Greens/EFA; The Left	Greens/EFA; The Left	NI
Leader since	6 February 2024	19 March 2024	22 February 2024
Last election	3 seats, 5.6%	3 seats (UPCE) (Note: Within the Podemos–IU and CpE alliances in the 2019 election.)	Did not contest
Seats won	3	3	3
Seat change	0	0	▲3
Popular vote	860,660	818,015	803,545
Percentage	4.9%	4.7%	4.6%
Swing	▼0.7 pp	n/a	New party

An election was held in Spain on 9 June 2024 as part of the concurrent EU-wide election to the 10th European Parliament. All 61 seats allocated to the Spanish constituency as per the Treaty of Lisbon and the 2023 Council Decision establishing the composition of the European Parliament were up for election.

The election resulted in a victory for the opposition People's Party (PP), albeit short of the landslide victory that opinion polls had predicted a few weeks before the vote. At 34.2% and 22 seats, this was an increase of 14 percentage points and 9 seats from its 2019 performance. The ruling Spanish Socialist Workers' Party (PSOE), with third deputy prime minister Teresa Ribera as its lead candidate, held its own by scoring 30.2% and 20 seats, a drop of less than three points and one seat to its 2019 result. Far-right Vox increased its count by three points and two seats to just below 10% and 6, whereas the left-wing vote split between Yolanda Díaz's Sumar alliance and former minister Irene Montero's Podemos. The election was notable for the surprise performance of social media polemicist Alvise Pérez's right-wing Se Acabó La Fiesta (Spanish for "The Party is Over"), which scored in sixth place just below Sumar. Left-wing nationalist Ahora Repúblicas roughly maintained its share and seats from the 2019 election, whereas Carles Puigdemont's Together and Free for Europe (Junts UE) and the peripheral nationalist Coalition for a Solidary Europe (CEUS) saw large drops in support. The vote for liberal Citizens (Cs), which had peaked at 12.2% and 8 seats in the previous election, collapsed to 0.7%, losing all of its parliamentary representation.

The aftermath of the election saw the resignation of Yolanda Díaz as Sumar's leader over her alliance's disappointing results and in Vox leaving the European Conservatives and Reformists (ECR) to join Viktor Orbán's new Patriots for Europe grouping.

== Overview ==
=== Electoral system ===
Voting for the European Parliament in Spain was based on universal suffrage, which comprised all Spanish nationals and resident non-national European citizens over 18 years of age with full political rights, provided that they had not been deprived of the right to vote by a final sentence. Amendments in 2022 abolished the "begged" voting system (Spanish: voto rogado), under which non-resident citizens were required to apply for voting. The begged vote system was attributed responsibility for a major decrease in the turnout of Spaniards abroad during the years it was in force.

61 European Parliament seats were allocated to Spain as per the Treaty of Lisbon and subsequent acts. All were elected in a single multi-member constituency—comprising the entire national territory—using the D'Hondt method and closed-list proportional voting, with no electoral threshold. The use of this electoral method resulted in an effective threshold depending on district magnitude and vote distribution.

The law did not provide for by-elections to fill vacant seats; instead, any vacancies arising after the proclamation of candidates and during the legislative term were filled by the next candidates on the party lists or, when required, by designated substitutes.

=== Outgoing delegation ===
The table below shows the composition of the Spanish delegation in the chamber at the time of the election call.

Delegation composition in May 2024
Groups	Parties	MEPs	
Groups	Parties	Seats	Total
Progressive Alliance of Socialists and Democrats	PSOE	21	21
European People's Party	PP	13	13
Renew Europe	Cs	7	9
Renew Europe	EAJ/PNV	1	9
Renew Europe	INDEP	1 (Note: Javier Nart, former Cs MEP.)	9
The Left in the European Parliament – GUE/NGL	Podemos	3	6
The Left in the European Parliament – GUE/NGL	SMR	1	6
The Left in the European Parliament – GUE/NGL	IU	1	6
The Left in the European Parliament – GUE/NGL	Anticap.	1 (Note: Miguel Urbán, former Podemos MEP.)	6
European Conservatives and Reformists	Vox	4	4
Greens–European Free Alliance	ERC	2	3
Greens–European Free Alliance	BNG	1	3
Non-Inscrits	Junts	3	3

== Parties and candidates ==
The electoral law allowed for parties and federations registered in the interior ministry, alliances and groupings of electors to present lists of candidates. Parties and federations intending to form an alliance were required to inform the relevant electoral commission within 10 days of the election call. In order to be entitled to run, parties, federations, alliances and groupings of electors needed to secure the signature of at least 15,000 registered electors; this requirement could be lifted and replaced through the signature of at least 50 elected officials—deputies, senators, MEPs or members from the legislative assemblies of autonomous communities or from local city councils. Electors and elected officials were disallowed from signing for more than one list. Additionally, a balanced composition of men and women was required in the electoral lists, so that candidates of either sex made up at least 40 percent of the total composition.

Below is a list of the main parties and alliances which contested the election:

Candidacy	Parties and alliances	Leading candidate	Ideology	Previous result		Ref.
Candidacy	Parties and alliances	Leading candidate	Ideology	Vote %	Seats	Ref.
PSOE	List: Spanish Socialist Workers' Party (PSOE); Socialists' Party of Catalonia (PSC)	Teresa Ribera	Social democracy	32.9%	21	
PP	List: People's Party (PP)	Dolors Montserrat	Conservatism; Christian democracy	20.2%	13	
Cs	List: Citizens–Party of the Citizenry (Cs)	Jordi Cañas	Liberalism	12.2%	8	
Sumar	List: Unite Movement (SMR); United Left (IU) – Communist Party of Spain (PCE) – The Dawn Marxist Organization (La Aurora (OM)) – Republican Left (IR) – Unitarian Candidacy of Workers (CUT); Greens Equo (VQ); More Madrid (MM); Catalonia in Common (CatComú) – Barcelona in Common (BComú) – Green Left (EV); Commitment Coalition (Compromís) – Més–Compromís (Més) – Valencian People's Initiative (IdPV) – Greens Equo of the Valencian Country (VerdsEquo); New Canaries–Canarian Bloc (NC–BC); Aragonese Union (CHA); Andalusian People's Initiative (IdPA); Castilian Party–Commoners' Land (PCAS–TC)	Estrella Galán	Progressivism; Green politics Democratic socialism	11.4% (Note: Results for Podemos–IU (10.1%, 6 seats) and CpE (1.3%, 0 seats) in the 2019 election.)	6	
Podemos	List: We Can (Podemos); Green Alliance (AV)	Irene Montero	Left-wing populism Democratic socialism	11.4%	6	
Vox	List: Vox (Vox)	Jorge Buxadé	Right-wing populism Ultranationalism; National conservatism	6.2%	4	
Ahora; Repúblicas	List: Republican Left of Catalonia (ERC); Basque Country Gather (EH Bildu) – Create (Sortu) – Basque Solidarity (EA) – Alternative (Alternatiba); Galician Nationalist Bloc (BNG) – Galician People's Union (UPG) – Galician Movement for Socialism (MGS) – Abrente–Galician Democratic Left (Abrente–EDG) – Galician Workers' Front (FOGA); Now More (Ara Més) – More for Mallorca (Més) – More for Menorca (MxMe) – Now Eivissa (Ara Eivissa)	Diana Riba	Secessionism; Left-wing nationalism	5.6%	3	
Junts UE	List: Together for Catalonia (JxCat); Democrats of Catalonia (DC); Left Movement of Catalonia (MESCat)	Toni Comín	Catalan independence Populism	4.5% (Note: Results for Junts in the 2019 election.)	3	
CEUS	List: Basque Nationalist Party (EAJ/PNV); Canarian Coalition (CCa); Yes to the Future (GBai) – Future Social Greens (GSB/GSV) – Villava Group (ATALADEA); Proposal for the Isles (El Pi)	Oihane Agirregoitia	Peripheral nationalism	2.8%	1	
SALF	List: The Party is Over (Se Acabó La Fiesta)	Alvise Pérez	Right-wing populism Anti-establishment	Did not contest		

== Campaign ==
=== Party slogans ===
Party or alliance	Original slogan	English translation	Ref.
PSOE	« Más Europa »	"More Europe"	
PP	« Tu voto es la respuesta »	"Your vote is the answer"	
Cs	« Equipo España »	"Team Spain"	
Vox	« Nos van a oír »	"They will hear us"	
Sumar	« Marca el rumbo »	"Set the course"	
Podemos	« Así es la vida »	"That is life"	
Ahora Repúblicas: ERC; EH Bildu; BNG; Ara Més	ERC: « Europa Republicana » EH Bildu: « Nazioa gara. Orain Euskal Herria » BNG: « A voz galega en Europa » Ara Més: « La veu de les Illes a Europa »	ERC: "Republican Europe"; EH Bildu: « We are a nation. Basque Country Now » BNG: « The Galician voice in Europe » Ara Més: « The voice of the Islands (Note: Catalan les Illes specifically refers to the Balearic Islands in this context.) in Europe »	
Junts UE	« Per seguir guanyant a Europa »	"To keep winning in Europe"	
CEUS: EAJ/PNV; CCa; GBai; El Pi	EAJ/PNV: « Indar Berria Europan. Tu voz importa » CCa: « El poder de nuestro acento » GBai: « Nafarroa Europan. Tu voz importa » El Pi: « Que Europa es banyi »	EAJ/PNV: "New force in Europe. Your voice matters" CCa: "The power of our accent/language" (Note: Spanish acento has double meaning, referring to both the Canarian spoken language and to put emphasis in something.); GBai: "Navarre in Europe. Your voice matters" El Pi: "Let Europe take a risk"	

=== Debates ===
2024 European Parliament election debates in Spain
Date	Organizer(s)	Moderator(s)	P Present (Note: Denotes a main invitee attending the event.) S Surrogate (Note: Denotes a main invitee not attending the event, sending a surrogate in their place.) NI Not invited I Invited A Absent invitee										
Date	Organizer(s)	Moderator(s)	PSOE	PP	Cs	Vox	Sumar	Podemos	AR	Junts	CEUS	Audience	Refs
22 May	laSexta (El Objetivo)	Ana Pastor	P Ribera	P Montserrat	NI	NI	NI	NI	NI	NI	NI	3.9% (404,000)	
3 June	Prisa	Àngels Barceló; Carlos de Vega	P Ribera	P Montserrat	P Cañas	P Buxadé	P Galán	P Montero	NI	NI	NI		
6 June	RTVE	Xabier Fortes	P Ribera	P Montserrat	P Cañas	P Buxadé	P Galán	P Montero	P Riba	S Sarri	P Agirregoitia	5.6% (595,000)	

== Opinion polls ==
The tables below list opinion polling results in reverse chronological order, showing the most recent first and using the dates when the survey fieldwork was done, as opposed to the date of publication. Where the fieldwork dates are unknown, the date of publication is given instead. The highest percentage figure in each polling survey is displayed with its background shaded in the leading party's colour. If a tie ensues, this is applied to the figures with the highest percentages. The "Lead" column on the right shows the percentage-point difference between the parties with the highest percentages in a poll.

=== Voting intention estimates ===
The table below lists weighted voting intention estimates. Refusals are generally excluded from the party vote percentages, while question wording and the treatment of "don't know" responses and those not intending to vote may vary between polling organisations. When available, seat projections determined by the polling organisations are displayed below (or in place of) the percentages in a smaller font.

Color key:

Poll conducted after legal ban on opinion polls

Polling firm/Commissioner	Fieldwork date	Sample size	Turnout	PSOE	PP	Cs	Podemos	Vox	AR	JxCat Junts	CEUS	Más País	PACMA	Sumar	SALF	Lead
2024 EP election	9 Jun 2024	—N/a	46.4	30.2; 20	34.2; 22	0.7; 0	3.3; 2	9.6; 6	4.9; 3	2.5; 1	1.6; 1	(Note: Within Sumar.)	0.8; 0	4.7; 3	4.6; 3	4.0
SocioMétrica/El Español	30 Apr–9 Jun 2024	4,612	?	28.7; 19/20	34.5; 23/25	1.0; 0	4.2; 2/3	10.5; 6/7	4.2; 2/3	2.3; 1	1.4; 0/1		–	6.3; 3/4	2.9; 1/2	5.8
Sigma Dos/RTVE–FORTA	24 May–8 Jun 2024	12,000	?	30.2; 20/22	32.4; 21/23	1.0; 0	4.4; 2/3	10.4; 6/7	4.3; 2/3	2.1; 1	1.6; 1		–	6.3; 3/4	3.9; 2/3	2.2
40dB/Prisa	6 Jun 2024	800	?	29.7; 20	32.4; 22	? 0	4.0; 2/3	10.3; 6/7	4.3; 2/3	2.4; 1	1.6; 0/1		–	6.0; 3/4	3.1; 1/2	2.7
Metroscopia	3–6 Jun 2024	2,000	?	30.1; 20/21	32.6; 22/23	0.4; 0	4.9; 3	10.1; 6/7	4.5; 3	2.0; 1	1.8; 1		–	5.4; 3/4	3.6; 2	2.5
KeyData/Público	3 Jun 2024	?	51.5	30.0; 20	33.9; 23	1.0; 0	3.7; 2	9.9; 6	4.4; 3	2.4; 1	1.7; 1		–	6.1; 4	2.8; 1	3.9
Data10/Okdiario	2–3 Jun 2024	1,500	?	30.2; 20	34.4; 23	1.0; 0	3.9; 2	10.3; 7	4.4; 3	2.5; 1	1.6; 1		–	6.2; 4	–	4.2
ElectoPanel/Electomanía	1–3 Jun 2024	1,422	?	30.2; 21	32.9; 23	0.8; 0	3.6; 2	9.5; 6	4.2; 2	2.5; 1	1.7; 1		1.2; 0	5.9; 4	2.5; 1	2.7
Sigma Dos/El Mundo	27 May–3 Jun 2024	3,535	?	30.3; 20/21	33.2; 22/23	? 0	4.1; 2/3	10.5; 6/7	4.3; 2/3	1.9; 1	1.4; 0/1		–	6.0; 4	3.4; 2	2.9
SocioMétrica/El Español	30 May–2 Jun 2024	630	?	29.3; 20	34.1; 23	0.9; 0	3.7; 2	10.1; 7	3.8; 2	2.8; 1	1.6; 1		–	6.3; 4	2.7; 1	4.8
Cluster17/Agenda Pública	29–31 May 2024	2,060	?	29.5; 20/21	33.8; 22/23	? 0	3.5; 2	10.3; 6/7	4.5; 3	2.6; 1	1.7; 1		–	5.9; 3/4	2.3; 1	4.3
Target Point/El Debate	29–31 May 2024	1,003	?	31.0; 20/21	33.5; 22/23	? 0	3.9; 2	8.9; 5/6	? 3	2.4; 1	? 1		–	6.0; 4	2.9; 1/2	2.5
GESOP/Prensa Ibérica	27–31 May 2024	630	?	31.5; 21/22	32.0; 21/22	0.9; 0	4.4; 2/3	8.1; 5/6	5.0; 3	2.0; 1	1.8; 1		–	5.8; 3/4	3.7; 1/2	0.5
NC Report/La Razón	27–31 May 2024	1,000	50.8	29.2; 20	35.0; 23/24	? 0	3.6; 2	9.9; 6/7	4.9; 3	2.8; 1	1.9; 1		–	6.4; 4	2.2; 1	5.8
ElectoPanel/Electomanía	25–31 May 2024	3,109	?	30.0; 20	33.5; 23	0.8; 0	3.3; 2	9.2; 6	4.5; 3	2.5; 1	2.0; 1		1.3; 0	6.3; 4	2.0; 1	3.5
Sigma Dos/El Mundo	24–31 May 2024	3,948	?	29.7; 19/21	32.7; 21/23	0.8; 0	4.0; 2/3	11.0; 6/7	3.8; 2	1.9; 1	1.3; 0/1		–	6.9; 4/5	3.5; 2	3.0
Hamalgama Métrica/VozPópuli	23–31 May 2024	1,000	?	29.6; 20	35.1; 23	0.9; 0	3.5; 2	10.2; 6	4.5; 3	2.5; 1	? 1		–	6.3; 4	2.0; 1	5.5
40dB/Prisa	28–30 May 2024	2,000	?	30.1; 20/21	33.2; 22/23	1.0; 0	4.0; 2/3	10.7; 7	4.8; 3	2.1; 1	1.4; 0/1		–	5.6; 3/4	2.5; 1/2	3.1
GAD3/ABC	27–30 May 2024	1,005	?	29.8; 20	34.9; 23/24	? 0	3.5; 2	9.7; 6	4.8; 3	2.4; 1	1.9; 1		–	5.9; 3/4	2.4; 1	5.1
CIS	27–30 May 2024	7,491	?	31.6–33.2	28.3– 30.5	0.7– 1.2	3.6– 3.9	9.9– 11.0	3.7– 4.1	1.5– 1.6	1.0– 1.3		–	5.4– 7.1	4.9– 5.7	2.7– 3.3
Metroscopia	28–29 May 2024	1,000	50	29.5; 20/21	33.6; 22/23	0.8; 0	3.6; 2	10.1; 6/7	4.7; 3/4	2.3; 1	1.8; 1		–	5.9; 3/4	3.1; 2	4.1
Sondaxe/La Voz de Galicia	23–29 May 2024	1,005	?	30.1; 20	34.5; 24	0.7; 0	3.8; 2	9.9; 6	4.0; 2	2.3; 1	2.1; 1		–	6.4; 4	2.6; 1	4.4
DYM/Henneo	23–28 May 2024	1,004	?	30.8; 20/21	34.4; 23	1.3; 0	3.3; 2	10.4; 6/7	4.2; 2/3	2.4; 1	1.2; 1		1.5; 0/1	5.9; 4	2.8; 1	3.6
Celeste-Tel/Onda Cero	23–28 May 2024	1,100	49.7	29.3; 20	34.9; 23	1.0; 0	3.6; 2	9.9; 6	4.8; 3	2.6; 1	1.8; 1		1.1; 0	6.3; 4	1.9; 1	5.6
SocioMétrica/El Español	25–26 May 2024	503	?	29.4; 20	34.8; 24	1.4; 0	3.3; 2	10.7; 7	4.5; 2	2.7; 1	1.4; 0		–	6.3; 4	2.0; 1	5.4
KeyData/Público	25 May 2024	?	54.0	28.7; 19	35.8; 24	1.0; 0	3.1; 2	10.6; 7	4.6; 3	2.3; 1	1.5; 0		–	7.4; 4	2.7; 1	7.1
Data10/Okdiario	22–24 May 2024	1,500	?	29.6; 20	35.4; 24	0.9; 0	2.9; 1	10.4; 7	4.7; 3	2.5; 1	1.7; 1		–	6.4; 4	–	5.8
GAD3/Mediaset	21–24 May 2024	1,002	?	31.4; 21	34.5; 23	0.7; 0	3.0; 2	9.3; 6	4.5; 3	2.4; 1	1.5; 1		–	5.7; 3	2.7; 1	3.1
NC Report/La Razón	20–24 May 2024	1,000	54.3	27.9; 19	36.1; 24/25	? 0	3.0; 2	9.0; 6	5.2; 3	2.9; 1/2	2.2; 1		–	6.8; 4	1.2; 0	8.2
Sigma Dos/El Mundo	20–24 May 2024	2,137	?	30.2; 19/20	35.1; 24/25	0.8; 0	3.6; 2	9.7; 6/7	3.6; 2	2.4; 1	1.3; 0/1		–	7.0; 4/5	2.6; 1/2	4.9
ElectoPanel/El Plural	18–24 May 2024	1,500	?	29.1; 20	33.7; 23	1.0; 0	3.1; 2	8.7; 6	5.3; 3	2.7; 1	2.1; 1		1.3; 0	5.8; 4	1.8; 1	4.6
Cluster17/Agenda Pública	21–23 May 2024	1,640	?	28.7; 19/20	34.1; 23/24	? 0	3.4; 2	9.6; 6	4.5; 3	2.6; 1	1.9; 1		1.3; 0/1	6.7; 4	2.2; 1	5.4
SocioMétrica/El Español	17–19 May 2024	519	?	28.8; 19	36.9; 25	0.9; 0	3.2; 2	10.4; 7	5.1; 3	2.4; 1	1.3; 0		–	7.0; 4	0.8; 0	8.1
NC Report/La Razón	13–17 May 2024	1,000	58.9	27.2; 18/19	36.3; 24/25	? 0	2.8; 1/2	9.4; 6	4.9; 3	2.7; 1	2.1; 1		–	7.7; 5	1.4; 0/1	9.1
ElectoPanel/El Plural	12–17 May 2024	1,250	?	28.6; 20	34.3; 25	0.9; 0	2.5; 1	7.7; 5	5.4; 3	4.0; 2	2.4; 1		1.3; 0	5.9; 4	1.1; 0	5.7
CIS (Logoslab) (Note: Alternative projection based on raw CIS data.)	8–17 May 2024	6,434	?	30.5; 20/21	33.0; 21/22	1.5; 0/1	? 2/3	? 7	? 2/3	? 1	? 1		–	? 3/4	? 2	2.5
CIS	8–17 May 2024	6,434	?	32.8– 35.2; 21/24	27.9– 30.2; 18/20	1.8– 2.6; 1/2	4.4– 5.4; 2/3	8.6– 10.1; 5/6	3.9– 5.0; 2/3	2.2– 3.0; 1/2	1.1– 1.6; 0/1		–	5.9– 7.2; 4	2.9– 3.8; 1/2	4.9– 5.0
Cluster17/Agenda Pública	14–16 May 2024	1,511	?	26.4; 17/18	35.4; 24	1.2; 0/1	3.4; 2	8.8; 6	5.6; 3	2.6; 1	2.0; 1		1.4; 0/1	6.6; 4	3.8; 2	9.0
40dB/Prisa	10–13 May 2024	2,000	?	30.1; 20/21	33.5; 22/23	1.1; 0	4.0; 2/3	12.6; 8/9	4.6; 3	2.2; 1	1.9; 1		–	5.7; 3/4	–	3.4
Simple Lógica/elDiario.es	1–9 May 2024	1,131	?	29.9; 20	36.4; 24	? 0	2.0; 1	10.9; 7	4.8; 3	2.2; 1	1.1; 0		–	8.0; 5	–	6.5
SocioMétrica/El Español	30 Apr–4 May 2024	1,279	?	26.7; 18	39.2; 26	1.2; 0	3.0; 2	10.3; 7	5.4; 3	2.3; 1	1.4; 1		–	6.4; 4	0.3; 0	12.5
Sigma Dos/El Mundo	24–30 Apr 2024	2,120	?	28.9; 19	35.7; 23	0.8; 0	3.1; 2	11.9; 7	4.1; 2	2.0; 1	1.8; 1		–	9.5; 6	–	6.8
SocioMétrica/El Español	9–12 Apr 2024	2,550	?	26.3; 17	38.1; 25	1.7; 1	2.4; 1	10.9; 7	6.1; 4	2.6; 1	1.8; 1		–	6.7; 4	–	11.8
GAD3/Mediaset	18–21 Mar 2024	1,017	?	26.5; 18/19	37.8; 25/26	0.3; 0	3.5; 2	9.2; 6	4.4; 3	2.7; 1	2.4; 1		–	7.2; 4	–	11.3
SocioMétrica/El Español	5–9 Mar 2024	2,900	?	24.5; 16	40.1; 26	0.9; 0	1.9; 1	10.6; 7	4.9; 3	3.0; 2	1.2; 0		–	9.3; 6	–	15.6
Ipsos/Euronews	23 Feb–5 Mar 2024	2,000	?	28.6; 19	37.7; 25	? 0	2.4; 1	10.4; 6	3.8; 2	2.5; 1	2.0; 1		–	9.7; 6	–	9.1
GAD3/ABC	26–29 Feb 2024	1,005	?	27.1; 18	38.4; 26	? 0	3.0; 2	8.6; 6	4.3; 2	2.7; 1	2.4; 1		–	7.3; 5	–	11.3
SocioMétrica/El Español	5–9 Feb 2024	2,900	?	28.1; 18	38.3; 25	? 0	1.0; 0	11.7; 7	3.2; 2	3.4; 2	1.5; 1		–	10.2; 6	–	10.2
NC Report/La Razón	12–18 Jan 2024	1,000	61.5	28.3; 18	37.5; 25	0.4; 0	1.7; 1	10.4; 6	3.0; 2	3.3; 2	2.1; 1		–	9.1; 6	–	9.2
SocioMétrica/El Español	25–31 Dec 2023	2,309	?	28.5; 19	37.1; 24	1.1; 0	3.3; 2	11.0; 7	3.2; 2	4.4; 2	1.3; 0		–	8.8; 5	–	8.6
Sigma Dos/El Mundo	15–26 Dec 2023	2,992	?	29.2; 19	38.1; 25	0.2; 0	2.6; 1	11.8; 7	2.8; 1	2.3; 1	2.0; 1		–	10.1; 6	–	8.9
SocioMétrica/El Español	20–24 Nov 2023	2,109	?	29.2; 19	36.8; 25	1.1; 0	2.0; 1	10.2; 6	4.2; 2	5.1; 3	1.3; 0		–	8.0; 5	–	7.6
2023 general election	23 Jul 2023	—N/a	66.6	31.7 (20)	33.1 (21)	–		12.4 (7)	3.9 (2)	1.7 (1)	1.6 (1)		0.7 (0)	12.3 (7)	–	1.4
November 2019 general election	10 Nov 2019	—N/a	66.2	28.0 (18)	20.8 (13)	6.8 (4)	12.9 (8)	15.1 (10)	5.3 (3)	2.2 (1)	2.8 (1)	2.4 (1)	0.9 (0)	–	–	7.2
2019 EP election	26 May 2019	—N/a	60.7	32.9; 21	20.2; 13	12.2; 8	10.1; 6	6.2; 4	5.6; 3	4.5; 3	2.8; 1	1.3; 0	1.3; 0	–	–	12.7

=== Voting preferences ===
The table below lists raw, unweighted voting preferences.

Polling firm/Commissioner	Fieldwork date	Sample size	PSOE	PP	Cs	Podemos	Vox	AR	JxCat Junts	CEUS	Más País	Sumar	SALF	Question	X mark	Lead
2024 EP election (Note: Does not include non-resident citizens.)	9 Jun 2024	—N/a	14.8	16.7	0.3	1.6	4.7	2.4	1.2	0.8		2.3	2.2	—N/a	50.8	1.9
GESOP/Prensa Ibérica	27–31 May 2024	630	24.3	21.6	0.7	3.2	4.5	2.8	1.4	1.0		3.5	2.8	18.8	10.6	2.7
40dB/Prisa	28–30 May 2024	2,000	24.8	19.8	1.6	4.6	10.9	3.7	2.3	1.2		4.7	1.9	11.6	6.9	5.0
CIS	27–30 May 2024	7,491	25.0	20.8	0.4	3.0	8.2	3.0	1.0	0.8		4.2	4.2	23.5	3.1	4.2
DYM/Henneo	23–28 May 2024	1,004	25.3	26.9	1.4	2.1	8.9	2.1	1.9	0.3		2.1	3.3	13.6	4.9	1.6
CIS	8–17 May 2024	6,434	27.3	22.8	1.4	3.8	9.2	3.6	1.8	0.9		5.2	3.2	16.3	2.0	4.5
40dB/Prisa	10–13 May 2024	2,000	23.6	21.2	1.9	4.2	11.5	3.2	1.9	1.5		4.1	–	12.9	8.1	2.4
Simple Lógica/elDiario.es	1–9 May 2024	1,131	16.7	16.7	–	0.8	4.1	2.8	1.5	0.3		4.2	–	–	–	Tie
CIS	9–13 Apr 2024	3,750	19.3	19.2	–	2.3	4.7	2.2	0.9	0.7		2.9	0.9	37.8	4.7	0.1
CIS	1–4 Apr 2024	4,032	22.4	23.4	0.7	2.3	7.2	2.4	1.0	0.5		5.3	–	25.0	3.5	1.0
2019 EP election	26 May 2019	—N/a	20.9	12.8	7.8	6.4	4.0	3.6	2.9	1.8	0.8	–	–	—N/a	35.8	8.1

=== Victory preferences ===
The table below lists opinion polling on the victory preferences for each party in the event of a European Parliament election taking place.

Polling firm/Commissioner	Fieldwork date	Sample size	PSOE	PP	Cs	Podemos	Vox	AR	Junts	Sumar	SALF	Other/ None	Question	Lead
CIS	27–30 May 2024	7,491	31.9	24.7	0.6	2.7	8.6	1.4	0.9	4.1	3.7	6.2	15.3	7.2
CIS	8–17 May 2024	6,434	32.4	25.4	1.6	4.1	10.0	2.4	1.5	5.0	–	7.6	10.1	7.0

=== Victory likelihood ===
The table below lists opinion polling on the perceived likelihood of victory for each party in the event of a European Parliament election taking place.

Polling firm/Commissioner	Fieldwork date	Sample size	PSOE	PP	Vox	Other/ None	Question	Lead
CIS	8–17 May 2024	6,434	34.5	40.4	0.6	1.4	23.0	5.9

=== Preferred candidate ===
The table below lists opinion polling on candidate preferences.

Polling firm/Commissioner	Fieldwork date	Sample size							Other/ None/ Not care	Question	Lead
Polling firm/Commissioner	Fieldwork date	Sample size	Ribera PSOE	Monts. PP	Cañas Cs	Montero Podemos	Buxadé Vox	Galán Sumar	Other/ None/ Not care	Question	Lead
40dB/Prisa	28–30 May 2024	2,000	23.5	18.2	1.7	8.9	11.3	3.8	26.9	5.6	5.3
CIS	8–17 May 2024	6,434	23.8	20.0	1.0	3.2	8.4	3.8	13.6	26.3	3.8

== Voter turnout ==
The table below shows registered voter turnout during the election. Figures for election day do not include non-resident citizens, while final figures do.

Province	Time (Election day)									Final		
Province	14:00			18:00			20:00			Final		
Province	2019	2024	+/–	2019	2024	+/–	2019	2024	+/–	2019	2024	+/–
Andalusia	32.98%	26.04%	−6.94	45.18%	35.11%	−10.07	60.61%	45.29%	−15.32	58.45%	43.63%	−14.82
Aragon	36.75%	29.96%	−6.79	51.27%	40.46%	−10.81	67.31%	52.86%	−14.45	64.96%	51.07%	−13.89
Asturias	32.20%	27.95%	−4.25	47.26%	40.73%	−6.53	61.15%	50.91%	−10.24	54.10%	44.73%	−9.37
Balearic Islands	29.26%	22.81%	−6.45	42.04%	30.20%	−11.84	53.62%	39.08%	−14.54	51.52%	37.71%	−13.81
Basque Country	36.88%	29.32%	−7.56	52.37%	40.60%	−11.77	65.40%	50.89%	−14.51	62.89%	48.82%	−14.07
Canary Islands	24.61%	18.89%	−5.72	40.03%	29.46%	−10.57	56.00%	40.70%	−15.30	51.43%	37.20%	−14.23
Cantabria	37.29%	31.42%	−5.87	55.08%	44.81%	−10.27	67.93%	54.90%	−13.03	62.95%	50.65%	−12.30
Castile and León	36.08%	30.47%	−5.61	52.51%	42.86%	−9.65	69.33%	55.46%	−13.87	64.51%	51.51%	−13.00
Castilla–La Mancha	37.29%	29.39%	−7.90	52.78%	39.87%	−12.91	69.99%	51.36%	−18.63	68.65%	50.34%	−18.31
Catalonia	35.38%	24.75%	−10.63	50.58%	33.70%	−16.88	64.23%	43.53%	−20.70	60.93%	41.54%	−19.39
Extremadura	39.12%	28.13%	−10.99	52.46%	36.82%	−15.64	70.07%	48.31%	−21.76	68.08%	46.91%	−21.17
Galicia	32.92%	26.47%	−6.45	50.21%	39.03%	−11.18	65.34%	50.50%	−14.84	54.54%	42.02%	−12.52
La Rioja	38.36%	31.33%	−7.03	53.48%	40.54%	−12.94	68.85%	52.52%	−16.33	64.63%	49.12%	−15.51
Madrid	35.13%	31.98%	−3.15	51.51%	44.66%	−6.85	67.26%	56.31%	−10.95	63.58%	52.54%	−11.04
Murcia	35.40%	28.97%	−6.43	48.39%	37.06%	−11.33	62.56%	48.25%	−14.31	60.78%	46.79%	−13.99
Navarre	39.04%	30.77%	−8.27	55.41%	41.30%	−14.11	70.40%	52.76%	−17.64	66.85%	50.04%	−16.81
Valencian Community	38.47%	33.15%	−5.32	51.48%	42.64%	−8.84	64.33%	53.69%	−10.64	62.50%	52.04%	−10.46
Ceuta	24.51%	16.77%	−7.74	40.65%	24.45%	−16.20	55.22%	32.58%	−22.64	52.97%	31.08%	−21.89
Melilla	25.02%	16.15%	−8.87	41.88%	23.97%	−17.91	59.73%	33.16%	−26.57	54.81%	30.14%	−24.67
Total	34.75%	28.00%	−6.75	49.45%	38.35%	−11.10	64.30%	49.21%	−15.18	60.73%	46.39%	−14.34

== Results ==
=== Overall ===
← Summary of the 9 June 2024 European Parliament election results in Spain →
Parties and alliances	Popular vote			Seats	
Parties and alliances	Votes	%	±pp	Total	+/−
People's Party (PP)	5,996,627	34.21	+14.06	22	+9
Spanish Socialist Workers' Party (PSOE)	5,291,102	30.19	−2.67	20	−1
Vox (Vox)	1,688,255	9.63	+3.42	6	+2
Republics Now (ERC–EH Bildu–BNG–Ara Més)	860,660	4.91	−0.67	3	±0
Unite (Sumar)^{1}	818,015	4.67	n/a	3	±0
The Party is Over (Se Acabó La Fiesta)	803,545	4.58	New	3	+3
We Can (Podemos)^{1}	578,007	3.30	n/a	2	−1
Together and Free for Europe (Junts UE)^{2}	442,140	2.52	−2.02	1	−2
Coalition for a Solidary Europe (CEUS)	284,888	1.63	−1.19	1	±0
Animalist Party with the Environment (PACMA)^{3}	135,691	0.77	−0.55	0	±0
Citizens–Party of the Citizenry (Cs)	122,292	0.70	−11.48	0	−8
Workers' Front (FO)	66,039	0.38	New	0	±0
The Forgotten Spain Exists–Municipalists–Fair World (Existe)^{4}	40,292	0.23	+0.06	0	±0
Spanish Left (IzqEsp)	32,766	0.19	New	0	±0
Feminists to the Congress (PFAC)	29,236	0.17	New	0	±0
Justice Europe (IE)	26,611	0.15	New	0	±0
Andalusia Now (Andalucistas)^{5}	22,965	0.13	+0.02	0	±0
Volt Spain (Volt)	22,020	0.13	−0.01	0	±0
Blank Seats to Leave Empty Seats (EB)	19,586	0.11	New	0	±0
Communist Party of the Workers of Spain (PCTE)	15,281	0.09	±0.00	0	±0
Pirates–Rebel Alliance–European Pirates (Pirates/Rebeldes)	14,484	0.08	+0.01	0	±0
PCPE–PCPC Coalition (PCPE–PCPC)^{6}	11,177	0.06	−0.07	0	±0
Spanish Phalanx of the CNSO (FE de las JONS)^{7}	9,677	0.06	+0.01	0	±0
Spanish Food Sovereignty (SAE)	9,311	0.05	New	0	±0
Believe in Europe (Cree en Europa)^{8}	9,276	0.05	−0.01	0	±0
Zero Cuts (Recortes Cero)	7,618	0.04	−0.18	0	±0
Humanist Party (PH)	6,550	0.04	±0.00	0	±0
Country and Rural Movement (PMR)	6,541	0.04	New	0	±0
Salamanca–Zamora–León PREPAL (PREPAL)	6,456	0.04	New	0	±0
Galician Party (GLG)	5,719	0.03	New	0	±0
Future (F)	5,671	0.03	New	0	±0
Together for Extremadura (JUEX)	5,611	0.03	New	0	±0
Workers' Revolutionary Current (CRT)	5,165	0.03	New	0	±0
Extremadurans (PREx–CREx)	3,509	0.02	−0.03	0	±0
Blank ballots	124,655	0.71	−0.26		
Total	17,527,438			61	+2
Valid votes	17,527,438	99.29	+0.15		
Invalid votes	124,569	0.71	−0.15		
Votes cast / turnout	17,652,007	46.39	−14.34		
Abstentions	20,398,279	53.61	+14.34		
Registered voters	38,050,286				
Sources
Footnotes: ^{1} Within the United We Can Change Europe and Commitment to Europe alliances in the 2019 election.; ^{2} Together and Free for Europe results are compared to Free for Europe totals in the 2019 election.; ^{3} Animalist Party with the Environment results are compared to Animalist Party Against Mistreatment of Animals totals in the 2019 election.; ^{4} The Forgotten Spain Exists–Municipalists–Fair World results are to the combined totals of For a Fairer World and Centrists for Europe in the 2019 election.; ^{5} Andalusia Now results are compared to Andalusia by Herself totals in the 2019 election.; ^{6} PCPE–PCPC Coalition results are compared to Communists totals in the 2019 election.; ^{7} Spanish Phalanx of the CNSO results are compared to FE de las JONS–Spanish Alternative–La Falange–National Democracy totals in the 2019 election.; ^{8} Believe in Europe results are compared to With You, We Are Democracy totals in the 2019 election.

Popular vote
PP	34.21%
PSOE	30.19%
Vox	9.63%
Ahora Repúblicas	4.91%
Sumar	4.67%
SALF	4.58%
Podemos	3.30%
Junts UE	2.52%
CEUS	1.63%
Others	3.65%
Blank ballots	0.71%

Seats
PP	36.07%
PSOE	32.79%
Vox	9.84%
Ahora Repúblicas	4.92%
Sumar	4.92%
SALF	4.92%
Podemos	3.28%
Junts UE	1.64%
CEUS	1.64%

=== Maps ===
Vote winner strength by province.

Vote winner strength by autonomous community.

=== Distribution by European group ===
Summary of political group distribution in the 10th European Parliament (2024–2029)
Groups	Parties	Seats	Total	%
European People's Party (EPP)	People's Party (PP)	22	22	36.07
Progressive Alliance of Socialists and Democrats (S&D)	Spanish Socialist Workers' Party (PSOE)	20	20	32.79
Patriots for Europe (PfE)	Vox (Vox)	6	6	9.84
Greens–European Free Alliance (Greens/EFA)	Republican Left of Catalonia (ERC); Galician Nationalist Bloc (BNG); Catalonia in Common (CatComú); Més–Compromís (Més)	1; 1; 1; 1	4	6.56
The Left in the European Parliament–GUE/NGL (The Left)	We Can (Podemos); Unite Movement (SMR); Basque Country Gather (EH Bildu)	2; 1; 1	4	6.56
Renew Europe (RE)	Basque Nationalist Party (EAJ/PNV)	1	1	1.61
Non-Inscrits (NI)	The Party is Over (Se Acabó La Fiesta); Together for Catalonia (Junts)	3; 1	4	6.56
Total		61	61	100.00

=== Elected legislators ===
The following table lists the elected legislators:

Elected legislators
#	Name	List
1	Dolors Montserrat Montserrat	PP
2	Teresa Ribera Rodríguez	PSOE
3	María del Carmen Crespo Díaz	PP
4	Iratxe García Pérez	PSOE
5	Alma Lucía Ezcurra Almansa	PP
6	Javi López Fernández	PSOE
7	Jorge Buxadé Villalba	Vox
8	Esteban González Pons	PP
9	Hana Jalloul Muro	PSOE
10	Fernando Francisco Navarrete Rojas	PP
11	Javier Moreno Sánchez	PSOE
12	Francisco Javier Zarzalejos Nieto	PP
13	Lina Gálvez Muñoz	PSOE
14	Diana Riba i Giner	Ahora Repúblicas
15	María Rosa Estarás Ferragut	PP
16	Hermann Leopold Tertsch del Valle-Lersundi	Vox
17	Estrella Galán Pérez	Sumar
18	Luis Pérez Fernández	SALF
19	Jonás Fernández Álvarez	PSOE
20	Francisco José Ricardo Millán Mon	PP
21	Pilar del Castillo Vera	PP
22	Leire Pajín Iraola	PSOE
23	Adrián Vázquez Lázara	PP
24	César Luena López	PSOE
25	Irene Montero Gil	Podemos
26	Juan Carlos Girauta Vidal	Vox
27	Gabriel Mato Adrover	PP
28	Idoia Mendia Cueva	PSOE
29	Raúl de la Hoz Quintano	PP
30	Nicolás González Casares	PSOE
31	María Esther Herranz García	PP
32	Antoni Comín i Oliveres	Junts UE
33	Cristina Maestre Martín de Almagro	PSOE
34	Pernando Barrena Arza	Ahora Repúblicas
35	Juan Ignacio Zoido Álvarez	PP
36	Mireia Borrás Pabón	Vox
37	Jaume Asens Llodrà	Sumar
38	Juan Fernando López Aguilar	PSOE
39	Diego Solier Fernández	SALF
40	Susana Solís Pérez	PP
41	Sandra Gómez López	PSOE
42	Pablo Arias Echeverría	PP
43	Antonio Javier López-Istúriz White	PP
44	Ignacio Sánchez Amor	PSOE
45	Margarita de la Pisa Carrión	Vox
46	Isabel Benjumea Benjumea	PP
47	Laura Ballarín Cereza	PSOE
48	Francisco de Borja Giménez Larraz	PP
49	Marcos Ros Sempere	PSOE
50	María Elena Nevado del Campo	PP
51	Rosa María Serrano Sierra	PSOE
52	Isabel Serra Sánchez	Podemos
53	Ana Miranda Paz	Ahora Repúblicas
54	Nicolás Pascual de la Parte	PP
55	Oihane Agirregoitia Martinez	CEUS
56	Jorge Martín Frías	Vox
57	Elena Sancho Murillo	PSOE
58	Maravillas Inmaculada Abadía Jover	PP
59	Vicent Marzà Ibáñez	Sumar
60	Nora Junco García	SALF
61	José Carmelo Cepeda García de León	PSOE

== Bibliography ==
- Ley Orgánica 5/1985, de 19 de junio, del Régimen Electoral General (Organic Law 5/1985). Official State Gazette (in Spanish). 19 June 1985 [version as of 2 February 2024]. BOE-A-1985-11672.
- Treaty of Lisbon amending the Treaty on European Union and the Treaty establishing the European Community (2007/C 306/01). Official Journal of the European Union. 17 December 2007. 12007L/TXT.
- European Council Decision (EU) establishing the composition of the European Parliament (European Council Decision (EU) 2023/2061). Official Journal of the European Union. 22 September 2023. 32023D2061.
