= Jorge Buxadé =

Spanish politician

Jorge Buxadé MEP
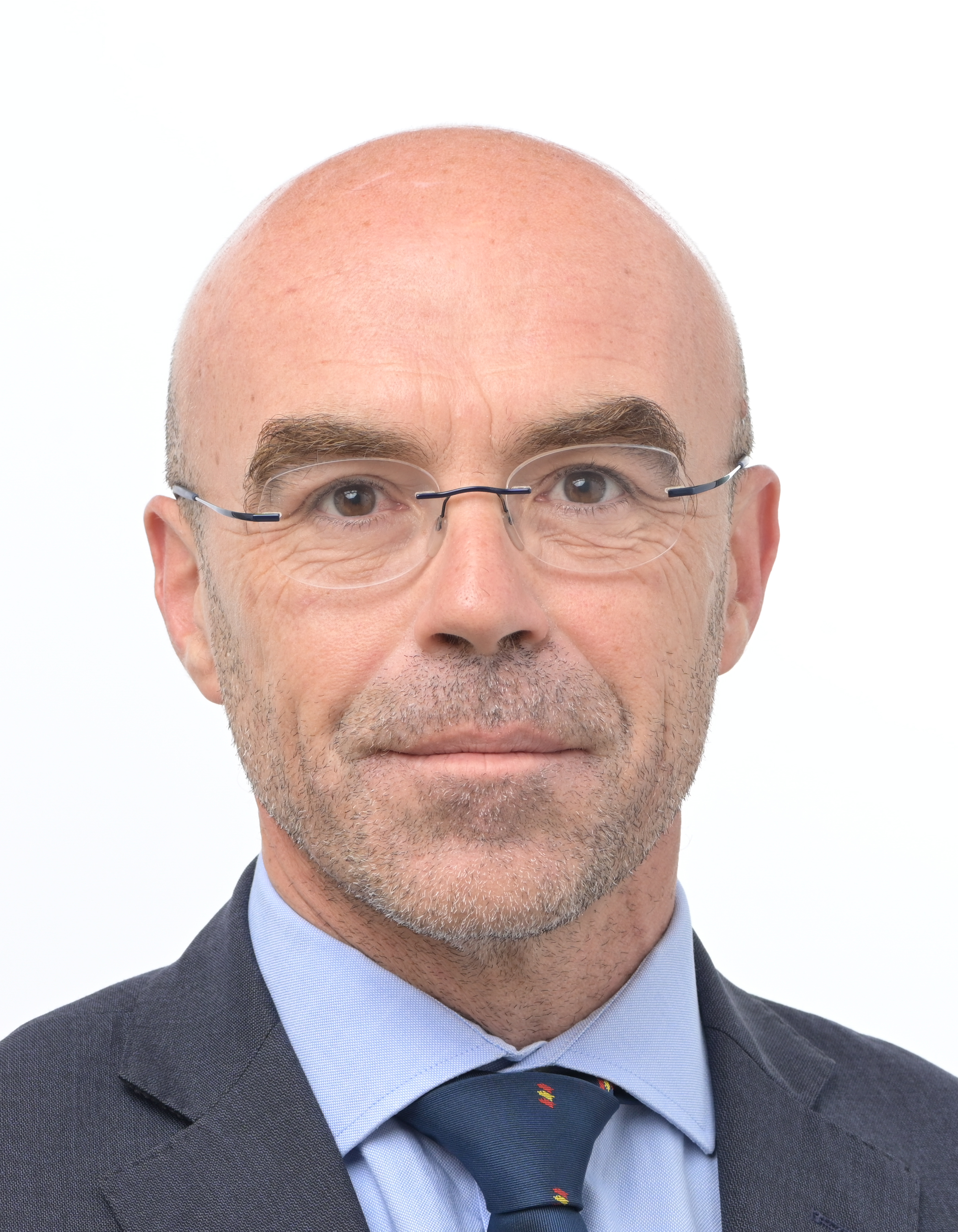
- Jorge Buxadé in 2024

Co-chairman of the European Conservatives and Reformists
- In office 11 December 2019 – 5 July 2024
- President: Giorgia Meloni
- Serving alongside: Ryszard Legutko

Member of European Parliament for Spain Head of the Vox Delegation to the European Parliament
- Incumbent
- Assumed office 2 July 2019

Personal details
- Born: Jorge Buxadé Villalba; 16 June 1975 (age 51) Barcelona, Spain
- Party: Vox (2014–present)
- Other political affiliations: Falange Española de las JONS (1995); Falange Española Auténtica (1996); PP (2004–2014)
- Education: Abat Oliba CEU University
- Occupation: Lawyer • Politician
- Awards: Order of Saint Raymond of Peñafort; Hungarian Order of Merit
- Website: www.jorgebuxade.es

Jorge Buxadé Villalba (Spanish: [ˈxoɾxe βuɣsaˈðe], Catalan: [- βuʃəˈðe]; born 16 June 1975) is a Spanish lawyer and right-wing politician who was elected as a member of the European Parliament in the 2019 European Parliament election in Spain, and has been spokesperson for the right-wing Vox party since February 2020. He previously worked for the centre-right People's Party between 2004 and 2014. He was an unsuccessful candidate in the 1995 Catalan regional election as a member of the far-right Falange Española de las JONS, and he was number 8 in the Falange Española Auténtica list for Barcelona for the 1996 Spanish general election.

== Biography ==
Born in Barcelona on 16 June 1975, Buxadé is graduated with a law degree from Abat Oliba CEU University. He entered the State Lawyers Corps in 2003.

He was the president of the Foro Catalán de la Familia, a conservative organization. He regularly writes for his own blog Lo antiguo es lo nuevo. He is opposed to Catalan independence and is a member and cofounder of anti-secessionist organizations like Societat Civil Catalana and Fundación Joan Boscà.

=== Political career ===
Buxadé was appointed as the second vice-president of Vox in March 2020, and remained in that position until January 2024.

Buxadé is a member of the Madrid Forum, an international alliance organized by Vox that comprises right-wing and far-right individuals.

He was awarded the Order of Saint Raymond of Peñafort, first class. In November 2023, he was awarded with the Cross of the Hungarian Order of Merit by the Viktor Orbán government.

== Political positions ==
Jorge Buxadé Villalba is a self-confessed admirer of José Antonio Primo de Rivera, the founder of the Spanish Falange. In September 2012, he described José Antonio and Ernesto Giménez Caballero, one of the ideologues of fascism in Spain, as "two superior souls". In the same article, published on his blog, he condemns the 1978 Constitution, adopted after the end of the Franco regime. He has also been directly linked with the far-right blog Dolça Catalunya, that contains anti-Catalanist, ultra-Catholic and discriminatory, mockery articles.

In a 2019 interview, he said that he regrets his former People's Party (PP) militancy, but that he doesn't regret having been a Falange militant.

Buxadé has been identified as the head of an "anti-globalist" faction in Vox, that would be opposed to the "liberal faction" represented by more moderate party members such as Víctor Sánchez del Real.

In 2026 Buxadé Villalba with fellow Patriots for Europe MEPs Raffaele Stancanelli and Mireia Borrás Pabón an amendment (am. 666) to the European Parliament's work on the Food and Feed Safety Omnibus. It would extend the grace period for selling and using pesticides after their approval is withdrawn or not renewed to up to three years in all cases. Corporate Europe Observatory describes the wording as mirroring a request from the pesticide industry group CropLife and Bayer. The three-year period is criticized excessive because it prolongs exposure to products that no longer meet EU requirements.

== Bibliography ==
- Borràs i Abelló, Jordi (2015). Desmuntant Societat Civil Catalana (in Catalan). Edicions Saldonar. ISBN 9788494675355.
