= Andrea Wechsler =

German politician (born 1977)

Andrea Wechsler MEP
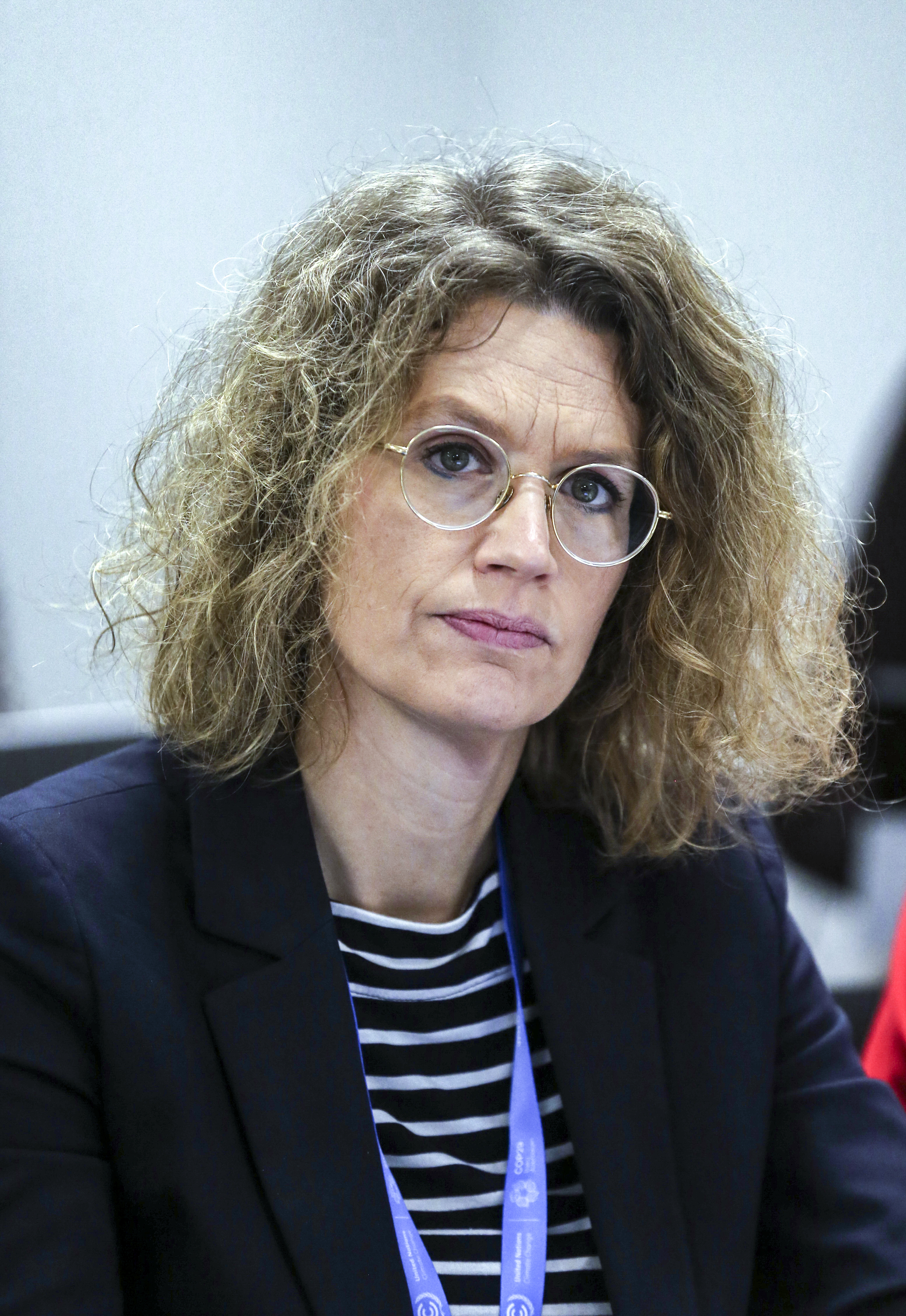

Member of the European Parliament
- Incumbent
- Assumed office 16 July 2024
- Constituency: Germany

Personal details
- Born: 19 June 1977 (age 49) Ulm, Germany
- Party: Christian Democratic Union
- Other political affiliations: European People's Party
- Education: University of Oxford; Columbia Law School; LMU Munich; Peking University

Andrea Wechsler (born 19 June 1977) is a German professor and politician of the Christian Democratic Union. She was elected member of the European Parliament in 2024.

== Education and Professional Career ==
Andrea Wechsler was born in Ulm. She attended school in Ulm and Munich and passed her A-levels at the Maria-Ward-Gymnasium in Munich (1997). After her time at school, she studied law at the University of Oxford (1997-2000) (Somerville College), at Peking University. (2000-2001), Columbia University School of Law (2001–2002) and at LMU Munich (2005–2006), as well as a doctorate at LMU Munich (2011). Andrea Wechsler worked as a management consultant at McKinsey & Company (2003–2005) and as a research associate and speaker at the Max Planck Institute for Innovation and Competition in Munich (2008–2011). From 2011 to 2013, she was a Max Weber Fellow at the European University Institute (EUI) in Florence, before taking up a professorship in private commercial law at Pforzheim University. in 2013. She also held the office of Prorector for Strategic University Development from 2017 to 2020 and has headed the ‘GründerWERK’ – Center for Business Start-ups at Pforzheim University and the Design Factory Pforzheim since 2015. Andrea Wechsler was a member of the Baden-Württemberg Consumer Commission as a scientist.

== Political career ==
Andrea Wechsler was active in the ‘Junge Union’ of Bavaria and the CSU as a teenager. In 2012, she joined the CDU Baden-Württemberg. Within her party, Andrea Wechsler is on the board of the Ludwigsburg CDU and deputy district chair of the Ludwigsburg CDU district association. She is on the board of both the Ludwigsburg Women's Union and the Nordwürttemberg District Women's Union. She is chair of the CDU state committee for economics and transformation and an assessor on the state board of MIT Baden-Württemberg. On May 13, 2023, Andrea Wechsler was nominated as the top candidate of the CDU Baden-Württemberg for the 2024 European Parliament election and, as such, was elected to the European Parliament. She thus replaced Rainer Wieland, who had been the top candidate for many years, at the top of the state list for the European elections.

== European Politics ==
Andrea Wechsler has been a member of the European Parliament since 2024. She is responsible for the administrative district of Stuttgart.

In the European Parliament, Andrea Wechsler is responsible for the Committee on Industry, Research and Energy (ITRE), the Committee on Employment and Social Affairs (EMPL), and the Committee on the Environment, Public Health and Food Safety (ENVI). She is also a member of the Delegation to the EU-Moldova Parliamentary Association Committee (D-MD), the Euronest Parliamentary Assembly (DEPA) and the Delegation for relations with the People's Republic of China (D-CN). Within the DEPA delegation, she is co-chair of the Committee on Economic Integration, Approximation of Legislation and Compliance with EU Policies (ECON).

== Voluntary positions ==
Andrea Wechsler is chair of the Europa Union's group of parliamentarians in the European Parliament.

== Honours ==
Faculty Award of LMU Munich for the dissertation (2013).
