= Estrella Galán =

Politician and president of CEAR

Estrella Galán MEP
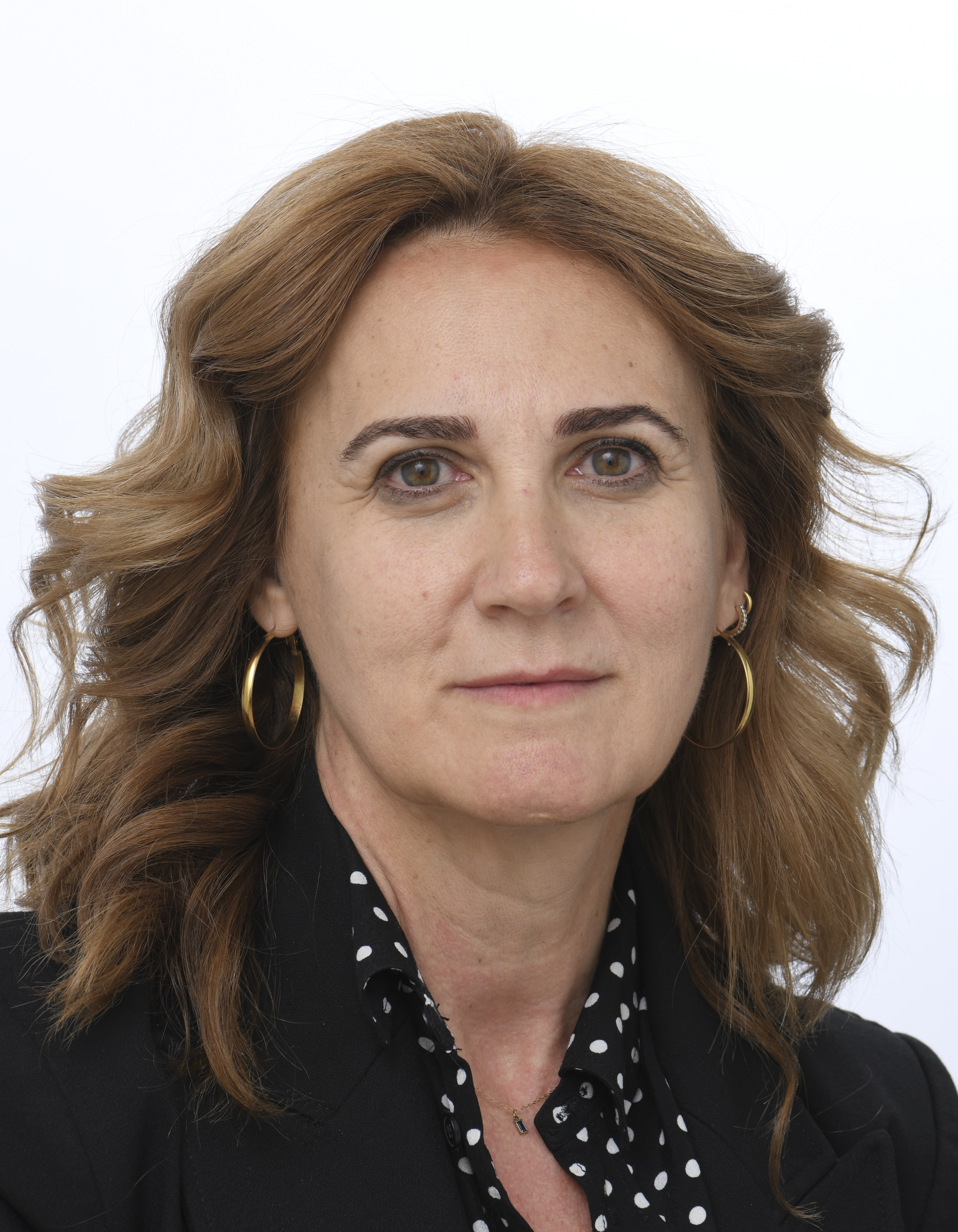

Member of the European Parliament
- Incumbent
- Assumed office 16 July 2024
- Constituency: Spain

Personal details
- Born: 24 April 1971 (age 55) Madrid, Spain
- Party: Independent (linked to Movimiento Sumar)

Estrella Galán Pérez (Spanish pronunciation: [esˈtɾeʎa ɣaˈlan]; born 24 April 1971) is a Spanish human rights activist who is the director general of the Spanish Commission for Refugee Aid (CEAR). She was Sumar's lead candidate for the 2024 European Parliament election in Spain, and was elected a Member of the European Parliament, where she joined the parliamentary group of The Left.

== Early life and education ==
Galán was born in Madrid. She has a degree in social and cultural anthropology, and a diploma in social work, from the Complutense University of Madrid. She also has a master's degree in migrations and intercommunal relations from the Autonomous University of Madrid.

== Human rights activism ==
Galán joined the Spanish Commission for Refugee Aid (CEAR) in 1999 and became its director general in 2011. In August 2013, she and Javier Galparsoro, the organisation's president in the Basque Country, took part on Atrapa un millón, the Spanish version of The Million Pound Drop; they gave their €20,000 winning to the charity, that was at risk of dissolution.

During the 2015 European migrant crisis, Galán blamed the European Union for making migration difficult, thereby purportedly enriching human traffickers. In 2017, she criticised the nations of the European Union for not meeting their targets for accommodating refugees. The following year, she criticised Spain's lack of preparedness for giving asylum to the passengers of the migrant boat Aquarius, rejected by Italy.

== Political career ==
In March 2024, Galán was confirmed as the lead candidate for Sumar in the 2024 European Parliament election in Spain. She criticised the Spanish Socialist Workers' Party (PSOE) for their support of the European migration pact, believing it to have conceded to right-wing governments such as Italy and Hungary. During an electoral debate, she showed a photograph of Vox leader Santiago Abascal and Benjamin Netanyahu meeting, and called the latter a genocidaire. Galán put forward that Sumar had led the Spanish government's decision to recognise the State of Palestine, and she also called for severing diplomatic ties with Israel. Sumar took under 5% of the vote and three seats in the European Parliament, including Galán's. She lamented the results and the gains for the far-right.
