= Coalition for a Solidary Europe =

Coalition for a Solidary Europe Coalición por una Europa Solidaria (Spanish) Europa Solidarioaren Aldeko Koalizioa (Basque) Coalición por unha Europa Solidaria (Galician) Coalició per una Europa Solidària (Catalan)
- Abbreviation: CEUS
- Founded: 2019
- Preceded by: Coalition for Europe (2014)
- Ideology: Regionalism; Europeanism; Civic nationalism
- Political position: Big tent
- European Parliament group: Renew Europe (EAJ/PNV)
- European Parliament: 1 / 61

Coalition for a Solidary Europe (Spanish: Coalición por una Europa Solidaria, CEUS) is an electoral list of regionalist parties that was formed to contest the 2019 and 2024 European Parliament election in Spain. The list is the de facto successor of the Coalition for Europe that ran in the 2014 and 2009 elections. Is formed by the Basque Nationalist Party (EAJ/PNV), Geroa Bai, Proposal for the Isles (El Pi), Geroa Socialverdes and Atarrabia Taldea.

== Composition ==
=== 2019 elections ===
Party	Scope
Basque Nationalist Party (EAJ/PNV)	Basque Country, Navarre
Canarian Coalition–Canarian Nationalist Party (CCa–PNC)	Canary Islands
Canarian Coalition (CCa)	Canary Islands
Canarian Nationalist Party (PNC)	Canary Islands
Commitment to Galicia (CxG)	Galicia
Yes to the Future (GBai)	Navarre
Expanding (Zabaltzen)	Navarre
Villava Group (AT)	Navarre
Proposal for the Isles (El Pi)	Balearic Islands
United to Advance (Els Units)	Catalonia
Valencian Democrats (DV)	Valencian Community

=== 2024 elections ===
Party	Scope
Basque Nationalist Party (EAJ/PNV)	Basque Country, Navarre
Canarian Coalition (CCa)	Canary Islands
Yes to the Future (GBai)	Navarre
Expanding (Zabaltzen)	Navarre
Villava Group (AT)	Navarre
Future Social Greens (GSB/GSV)	Navarre
Proposal for the Isles (El Pi)	Balearic Islands

== Electoral performance ==
=== European Parliament ===
European Parliament
Election	Leading candidate	Vote	%	Score	Seats	+/–	EP Group
2019	Izaskun Bilbao	633,090	2.82%	8th	1 / 59	0	RE
2024	Oihane Agirregoitia	281,064	1.63%	9th	1 / 61	0	RE

== History ==
=== Background ===
The Basque, Catalan and Galician nationalist parties maintained a long alliance in the elections to the European Parliament, which began in 2004 with the Galeusca–Peoples of Europe coalition. In the 2014 European elections, the Basque Nationalist Party, Convergence of Catalonia a federation formed by Convergència and Democratic Union of Catalonia and Commitment to Galicia formed the Coalition for Europe candidacy, along with other peripheral nationalist parties such as the Canary Coalition.

=== Formation of the candidacy ===
On March 15, 2018, the Canarian Coalition (CC-PNC) and the Basque Nationalist Party (PNV) announced a commitment to repeat their electoral alliance for the European elections the following year.

On January 15, 2019, David Bonvehí, president of the Catalan European Democratic Party (PDeCAT), successor party to Democratic Convergence of Catalonia, also announced a coalition agreement with the Basque Nationalist Party for the European elections, while endorsing Jordi Turull, politician imprisoned by the Catalan independence process, as hypothetical head of the list. This announcement was replicated by CC, which opposed the entry of the PDeCAT into the coalition, due to the pro-independence positions of the Catalan party. The final break between PNV and PDeCAT occurred after it was announced that Carles Puigdemont would lead a candidacy for the European Parliament. On March 21, the PNV issued a statement ruling out the coalition with the PDeCAT, considering that they proposed an "exclusively Catalan candidacy." Some political analysts also linked the rupture to the ideological differences between the more moderate positions of the Basque nationalists and Puigdemont. The Catalan party United to Advance, successor to the defunct Democratic Union of Catalonia, partner of the previous European coalitions, negotiated its entry into this list and, although it finally ruled it out, created a platform to support the candidacy. Josep Antoni Duran i Lleida, historical leader of Union of Catalonia and member of United to Advance, requested a vote for the coalition promoted by the PNV.

On May 6, 2019, the candidacy was officially presented, under the name of the Coalition for a Europe of Solidarity (CEUS). Representatives of all the coalition forces (PNV, CC-PNC, CxG, GBai, El Pi and DV) participated in the event, held in Bilbao.

=== Candidacy in 2019 ===
The top eight spots on the list are as follows:

- Izaskun Bilbao (EAJ-PNV)
- Luis Padilla (CC-PNC)
- Juan Carlos Piñeiro (CxG)
- Daniel Innerarity (GBai)
- María del Mar Llaneras (El Pi)
- Andoni Aldekoa (EAJ-PNV)
- María Belén González (CC-PNC)
- Lluís Vicent Bertomeu (DV)

Regarding the name of the candidacy, although this coalition has the official name of Coalition for a Solidarity Europe, in certain autonomous communities, as permitted by article 222 of the Organic Law of 5/1985, it is presented with the following names and list heads:

autonomous community	Denomination	Head of list
Andalusia	Coalition for a Solidary Europe (CEUS)	Izaskun Bilbao (EAJ-PNV)
Aragon	Coalition for a Solidary Europe (CEUS)	Izaskun Bilbao (EAJ-PNV)
Asturias	Coalition for a Solidary Europe (CEUS)	Izaskun Bilbao (EAJ-PNV)
Canary Islands	canarias coalition-Canarian Nationalist Party-Coalition for a Solidary Europe (Cca-PNC)	Luis Guillermo Padilla (CC-PNC)
Cantabria	Coalition for a Solidary Europe (CEUS)	Izaskun Bilbao (EAJ-PNV)
Castilla La Mancha	Coalition for a Solidary Europe (CEUS)	Izaskun Bilbao (EAJ-PNV)
Castile and Leon	Coalition for a Solidary Europe (CEUS)	Izaskun Bilbao (EAJ-PNV)
Catalonia	Coalition for a Solidary Europe (CEUS)	Izaskun Bilbao (EAJ-PNV)
Ceuta	Coalition for a Solidary Europe (CEUS)	Izaskun Bilbao (EAJ-PNV)
Valencian Community	Valencian Democrats-Coalition for a Solidary Europe (CEUS)	Lluís Vicent Bertomeu (DV)
Extremadura	Coalition for a Solidary Europe (CEUS)	Izaskun Bilbao (EAJ-PNV)
Galicia	Commitment to Galicia-Coalition for a Solidary Europe (CEUS)	Juan Carlos Piñeiro (CxG)
Balearic Islands	Proposta per les Illes-Coalition for a Solidary Europe (CEUS)	María del Mar Llaneras (El Pi)
La Rioja	Coalition for a Solidary Europe (CEUS)	Izaskun Bilbao (EAJ-PNV)
Madrid	Coalition for a Solidary Europe (CEUS)	Izaskun Bilbao (EAJ-PNV)
Melilla	Coalition for a Solidary Europe (CEUS)	Izaskun Bilbao (EAJ-PNV)
Murcia	Coalition for a Solidary Europe (CEUS)	Izaskun Bilbao (EAJ-PNV)
Basque Country	Euzko Alderdi Jeltzalea-Basque Nationalist Party-Coalition for a Solidary Europe (CEUS)	Izaskun Bilbao (EAJ-PNV)
Navarre	Geroa Bai-Coalition for a Solidary Europe (CEUS)	Daniel Innerarity (GBai)

=== Candidacy in 2024 ===
The candidacies proclaimed for the 2024 European Parliament elections were published in the Official State Gazette on May 14, 2024.

The top eight spots on the list are as follows:

- Oihane Agirregoitia Martínez (EAJ-PNV).
- Carlos E. Alonso Rodríguez (CCa).
- Amaia Arrizabalaga Idiaquez.
- Jordi Prunes Moya (El Pi).
- Aitana Agirre Loiarte (EAJ-PNV).
- Oswaldo Betancort García (CCa).
- Miren Itxaso Soto Diaz de Zerio.
- Caterina Neus Serra Cañellas (El Pi)

== 2019 European Parliament elections ==
Main article: 2019 European Parliament elections (Spain)

Coalition for a Europe of Solidarity was the eighth candidate by number of votes, obtaining 633,090 votes (2.82%) and one seat.

Territory	Votes	%	Position
Andalusia	3199	0,08 %	< 10º
Aragon	252	0,04 %	< 10º
Asturias	434	0,08 %	< 10º
Canary Islands	184 936	20,75 %	2º
Cantabria	773	0,25 %	9º
Castile and Leon	1454	0,11 %	< 10º
Castilla La Mancha	791	0,07 %	< 10º
Catalonia	3546	0,10 %	< 10º
Ceuta	98	0,30 %	9º
Spain	633 090	2,82 %	8º
Extremadura	1137	0,19 %	8º
Galicia	6524	0,45 %	9º
Madrid	3523	0,11 %	< 10º
Valencian Community	2836	0,12 %	< 10º
Murcia	648	0,10 %	< 10º
La Rioja	605	0,38 %	8º
Balearic Islands	15 957	3,81 %	7º
Melilla	13	0,04 %	< 10º
Navarre	27 146	8,00 %	5º
Basque Country	379 393	33,89 %	1º

Thanks to these results, Izaskun Bilbao (PNV) was elected.
