= Maravillas Abadía =

Spanish politician (born 1981)

Maravillas Abadía MEP
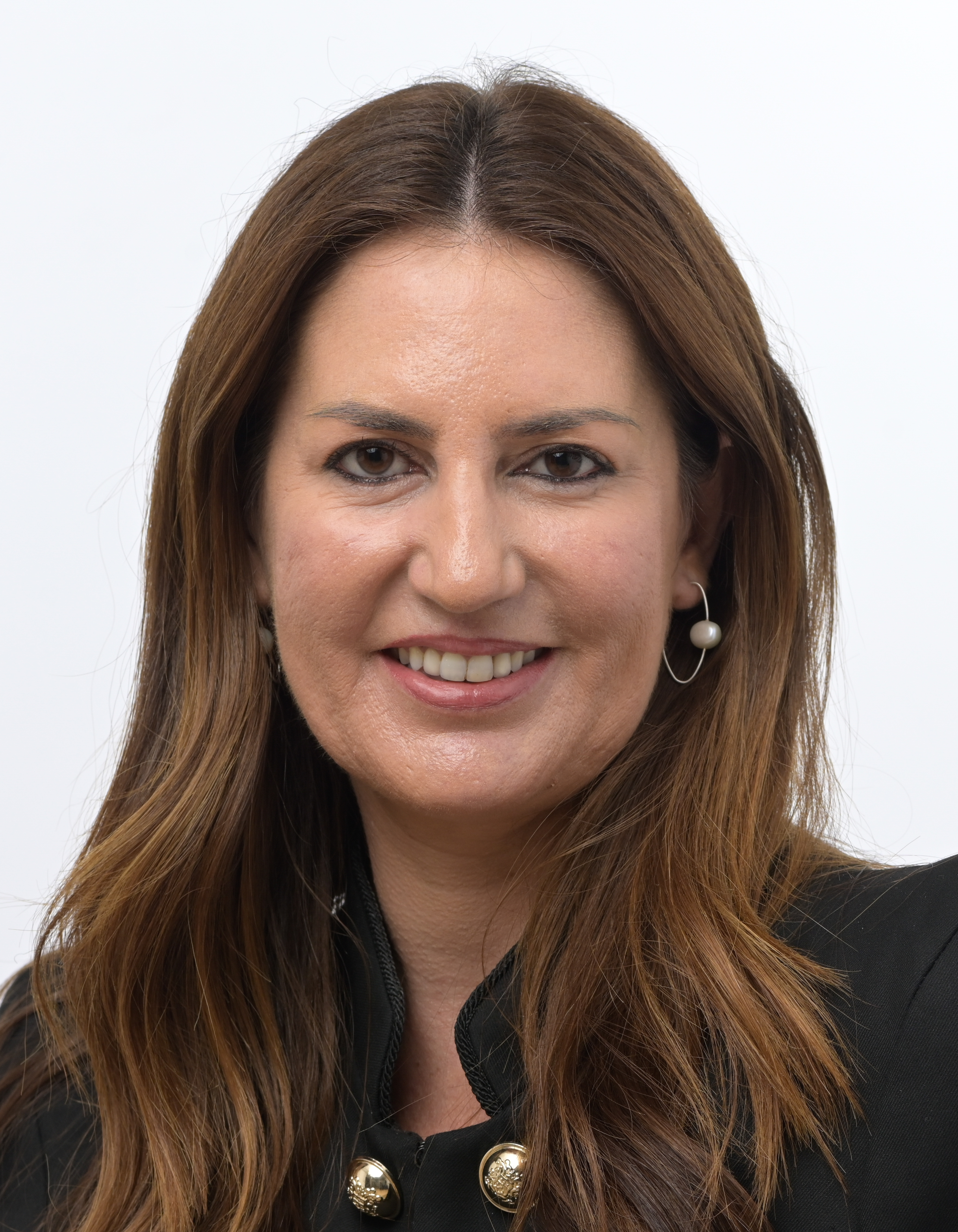

Member of the European Parliament for Spain
- Incumbent
- Assumed office 16 July 2024

Personal details
- Born: Maravillas Inmaculada Abadía Jover; 8 December 1981 (age 44) Murcia, Spain
- Party: People's Party
- Other political affiliations: European People's Party

Maravillas Inmaculada Abadía Jover (Spanish pronunciation: [maɾaˈβiʎas aβaˈði.a]; born 8 December 1981) is a Spanish politician of the People's Party who was elected member of the European Parliament in 2024. She served as general secretary of the Alcantarilla City Council until her election, and was previously auditor of Dolores.
