= Elena Sancho =

Spanish politician (born 1989)

Elena Sancho MEP
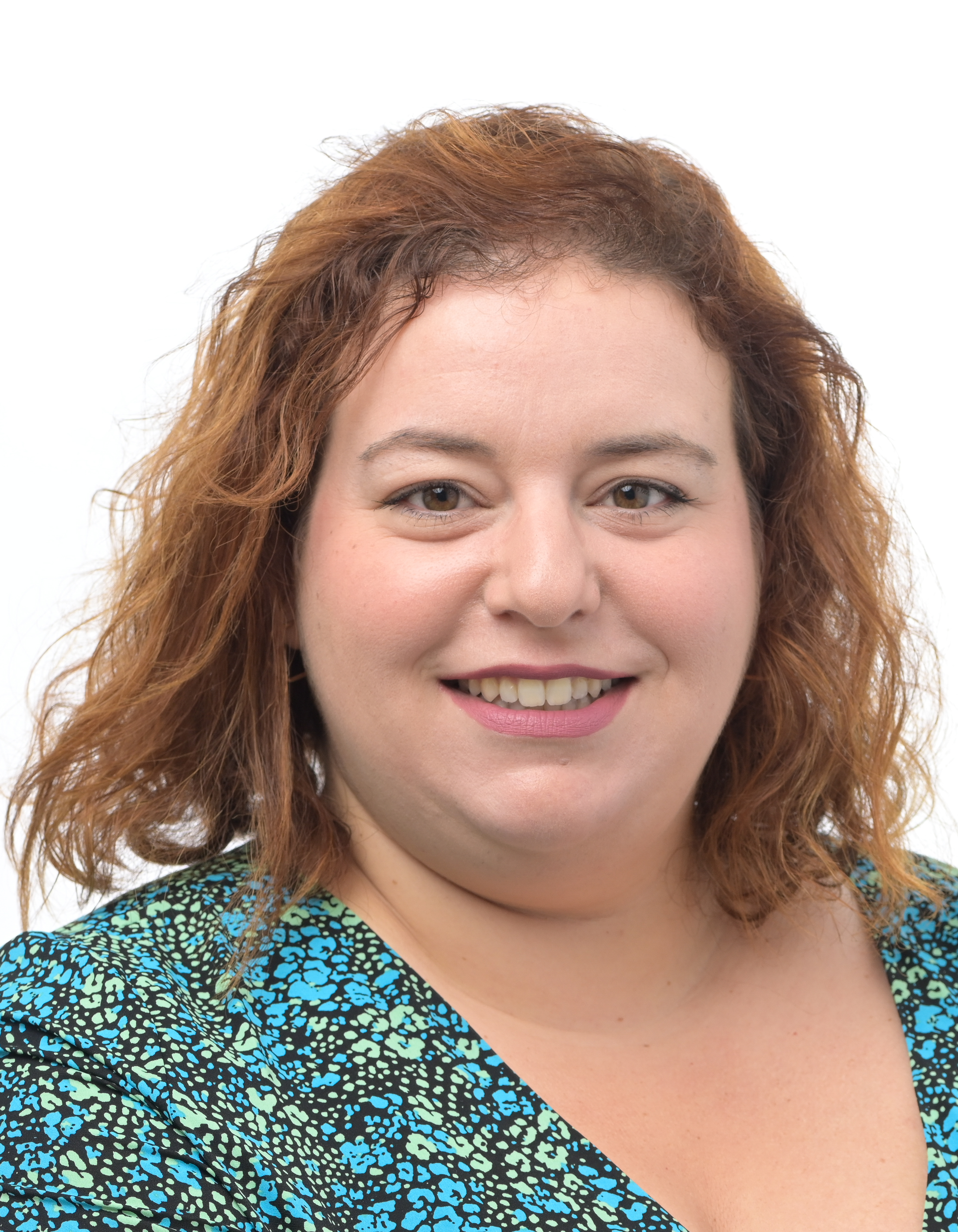
- Official portrait, 2024

Member of the European Parliament for Spain
- Incumbent
- Assumed office 16 July 2024

Personal details
- Born: Elena Sancho Murillo; 26 January 1989 (age 37)
- Party: Spanish Socialist Workers' Party
- Other political affiliations: Party of European Socialists

Elena Sancho Murillo (Spanish pronunciation: [eˈlena ˈsaɲtʃo]; born 26 January 1989) is a Spanish politician of the Spanish Socialist Workers' Party who was elected member of the European Parliament in 2024. She is a city councillor of Ribaforada and a member of the committee of the Socialist Party of Navarre. Until 2018 she was a member of the executive of the Socialist Youth of Spain, and until 2020 a member of the executive of the Socialist Youth of Navarre.
