= Víctor Manuel Sánchez del Real =

Spanish businessman and politician

Víctor Manuel Sánchez del Real MP
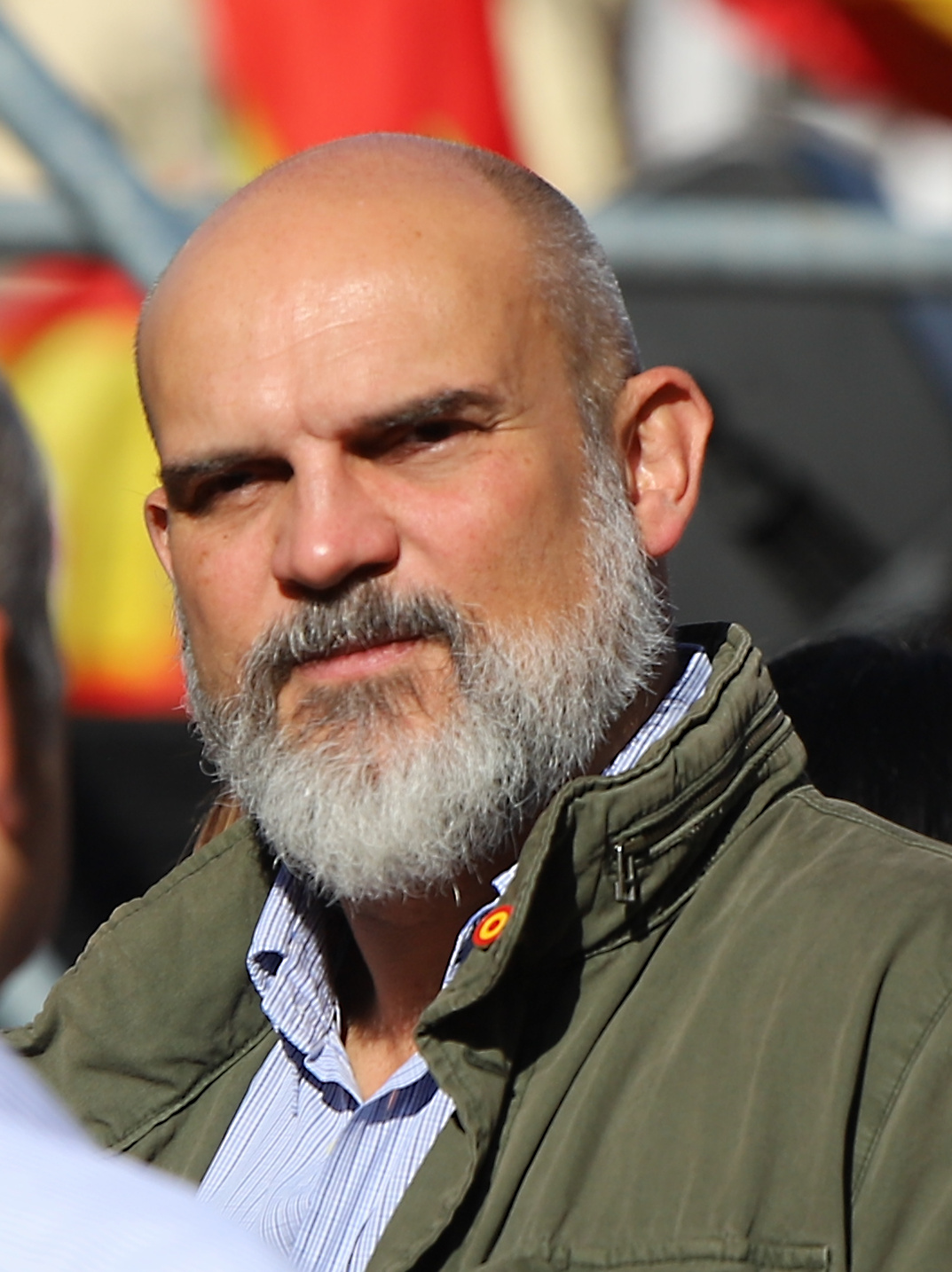

Member of the Congress of Deputies
- In office 17 May 2019 – 30 May 2023

Personal details
- Born: Víctor Manuel Sánchez del Real; 23 November 1969 (age 56) Ceuta, Spain
- Party: Vox.

Víctor Manuel Sánchez del Real (born 23 November 1969) is a Spanish businessman and politician who was a member of the 14th Congress of Deputies from the Vox party.

== Biography ==
Del Real was born in Ceuta and grew up in various locations around Spain due to his father's career as a military doctor. He was one of the original founding members of the Vox and has been the chief strategists and organizers for the party but is considered by Spanish media to remain largely out of the spotlight in contrast to Vox's other leadership figures. He was the party's campaign coordinator for the 2018 Andalusian regional election, where Vox got its first parliamentarians.

He served as a member of the Congress of Deputies from 2019 to 2023 for the Badajoz constituency.
