= Mireia Borrás Pabón =

Spanish politician

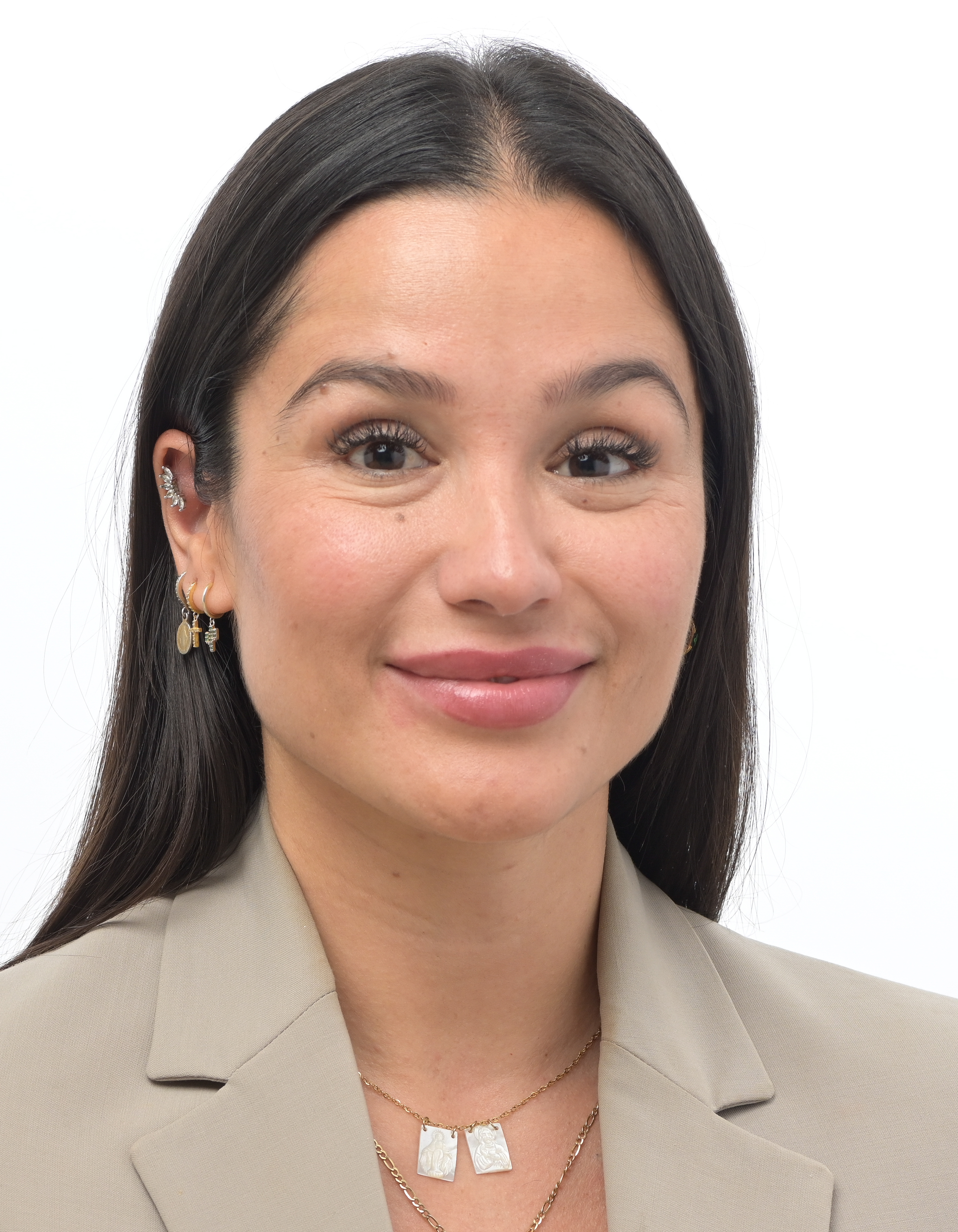
- Mireia Borrás in 2024

Member of the European Parliament for Spain
- Incumbent
- Assumed office 16 July 2024

Member of the Congress of Deputies
- In office 3 December 2019 – 17 August 2023
- Constituency: Madrid

Personal details
- Born: Mireia Borrás Pabón; 14 October 1986 (age 40) Madrid, Spain
- Party: Vox
- Education: Charles III University of Madrid
- Occupation: Entrepreneur • Politician

Mireia Borrás Pabón (Spanish pronunciation: [miˈɾeʝa βoˈras]; born 14 October 1986) is a Spanish politician and former member of the Congress of Deputies for Vox.

== Biography ==
Mireia Borrás Pabón was born in Madrid.

She has a degree in Economics and Journalism and a Master's in Finance from Charles III University of Madrid. After graduating, she worked for KPMG in Spain and later at Ernst & Young in London. She has founded two companies that produce environmental technology, including GoiPlug which manufactures eco-friendly portable batteries. Her support of environmental protection and decision to attend the 2019 United Nations Climate Change Conference has been highlighted by some journalists due to Vox's rejection of the scientific consensus on climate change, although Pabón has not publicly commented on this.

She was elected to the Congress of Deputies in the November 2019 Spanish general election for Vox representing the Madrid constituency.

In 2026, Borrás Pabón co-tabled, with fellow Patriots for Europe MEPs Raffaele Stancanelli and Jorge Buxadé Villalba, an amendment (am. 666) to the European Parliament's work on the Food and Feed Safety Omnibus. It would extend the grace period for selling and using pesticides after their approval is withdrawn or not renewed to up to three years in all cases. Corporate Europe Observatory describes the wording as mirroring a request from the pesticide industry group CropLife and Bayer. The three-year period is criticized excessive because it prolongs exposure to products that no longer meet EU requirements.
