= Nicolás González Casares =

Spanish politician

Nicolás González Casares MEP
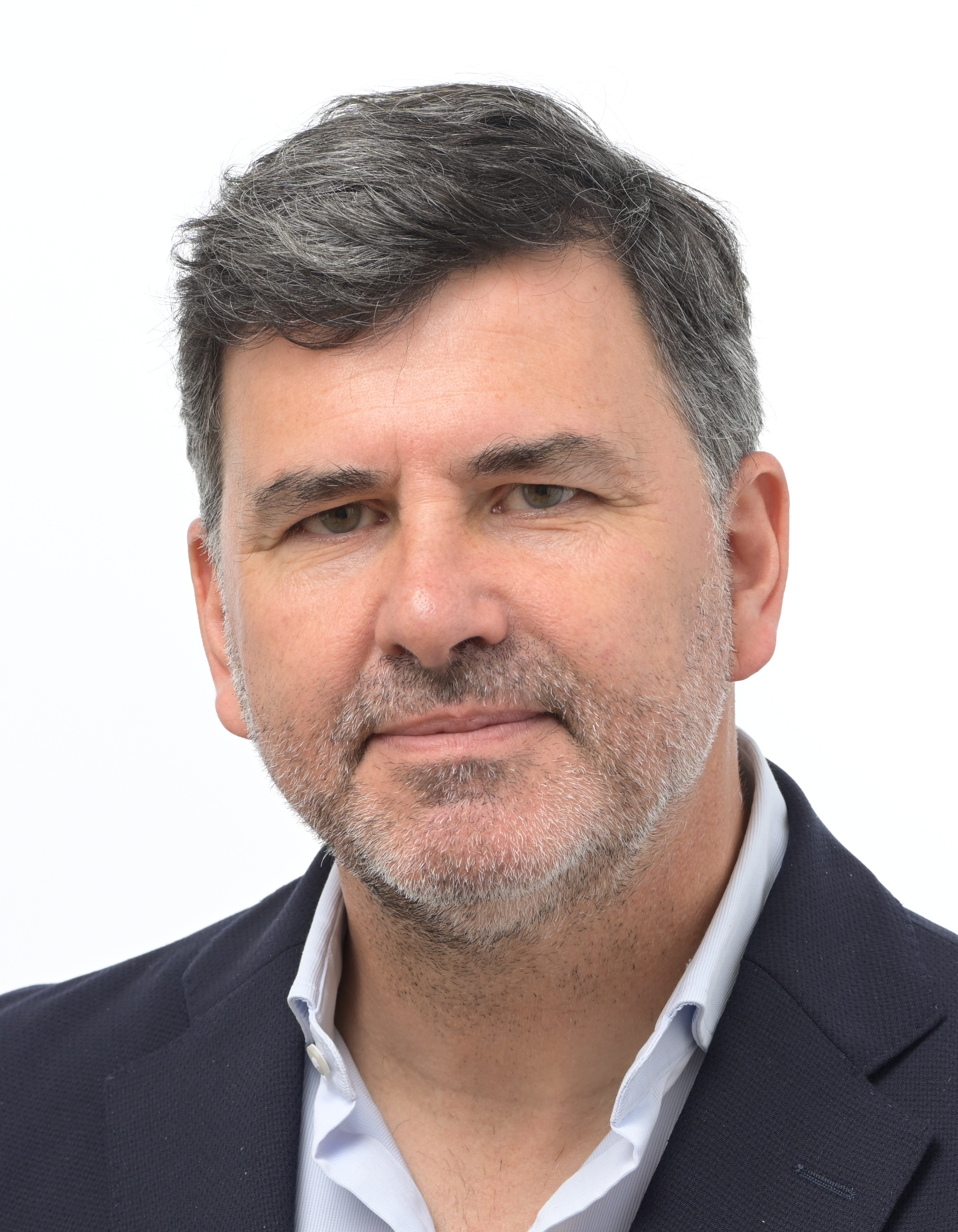

Member of the European Parliament for Spain
- Incumbent
- Assumed office 2 July 2019

Personal details
- Party: Spanish Socialist Workers' Party
- Education: University of Santiago de Compostela

Nicolás González Casares (pronounced [nikoˈlas ɣonˈθaleθ caˈsaɾes]) is a Spanish nurse and politician who was elected as a Member of the European Parliament in 2019.

== Political career ==
In parliament, González Casares serves on the Committee on Industry, Research and Energy. In 2020, he joined the Special Committee on Beating Cancer.

In addition to his committee assignments, González Casares is part of the parliament's delegation for relations with Japan. He is also a member of the Spinelli Group and the European Parliament Intergroup on Artificial Intelligence and Digital.
