= Oihane Agirregoitia =

Spanish politician

Oihane Agirregoitia MEP
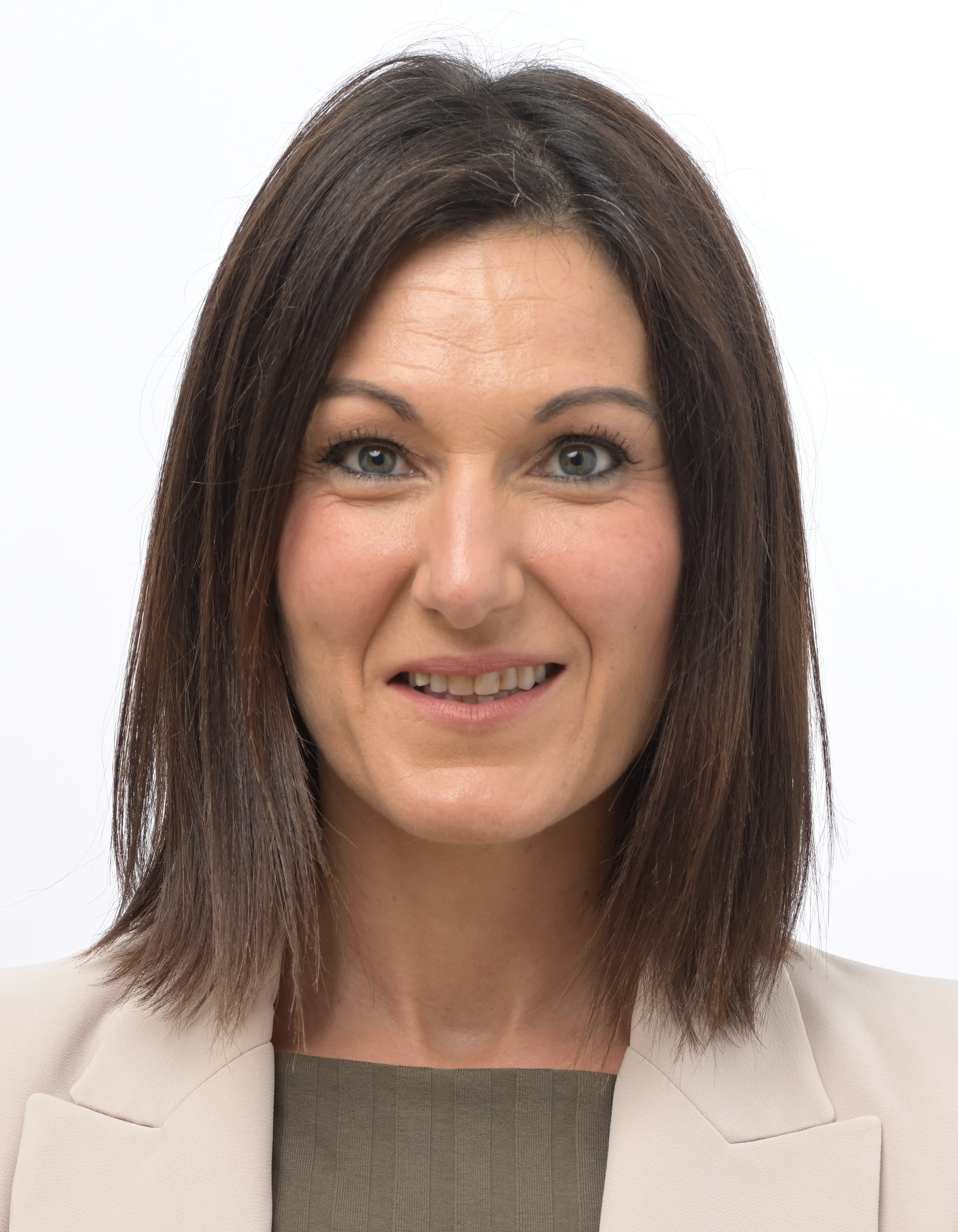

Member of the European Parliament for Spain
- Incumbent
- Assumed office 16 July 2024

Member of the Bilbao City Council
- In office 22 May 2011 – 28 May 2023

Personal details
- Born: Oihane Agirregoitia Martínez; 18 April 1980 (age 46) Bilbao, Spain
- Party: Basque Nationalist Party (2006–present)
- Children: 2
- Education: University of Deusto

Oihane Agirregoitia Martínez (Basque pronunciation: [oiˈane aˈɣireɣoiti.a]; born 18 April 1980) is a Spanish politician from the Basque Country. As the group leader for the Coalition for a Solidary Europe (CEUS) she was elected a Member of the European Parliament in the 2024 European Parliament election in Spain. From 2011 to 2023, she was a city councillor in Bilbao, for the Basque Nationalist Party (PNV).

== Biography ==
Born in Bilbao, Agirregoitia completed an engineering degree at the University of Deusto. She speaks Spanish, Basque and English. As of 2024, she is married and has a son and a daughter.

Agirregoitia joined the Basque Nationalist Party (PNV) in 2006. In 2011 she was elected to the city council on the party's list, remaining there for 12 years. Her responsibilities on the council included consumption, equality, youth, sports and citizen participation. Mayor Juan Mari Aburto awarded her the Medal of the City at the end of her service.

Ahead of the 2024 European Parliament election in Spain, the PNV chose Agirregoitia as its lead candidate on the list of the Coalition for a Solidary Europe (CEUS), a coalition with other peripheral nationalist parties. The coalition retained its one seat in the European Parliament, with an overall drop in votes.
