= Tomáš Kubín =

Czech politician (born 1962)

Tomáš Kubín MEP
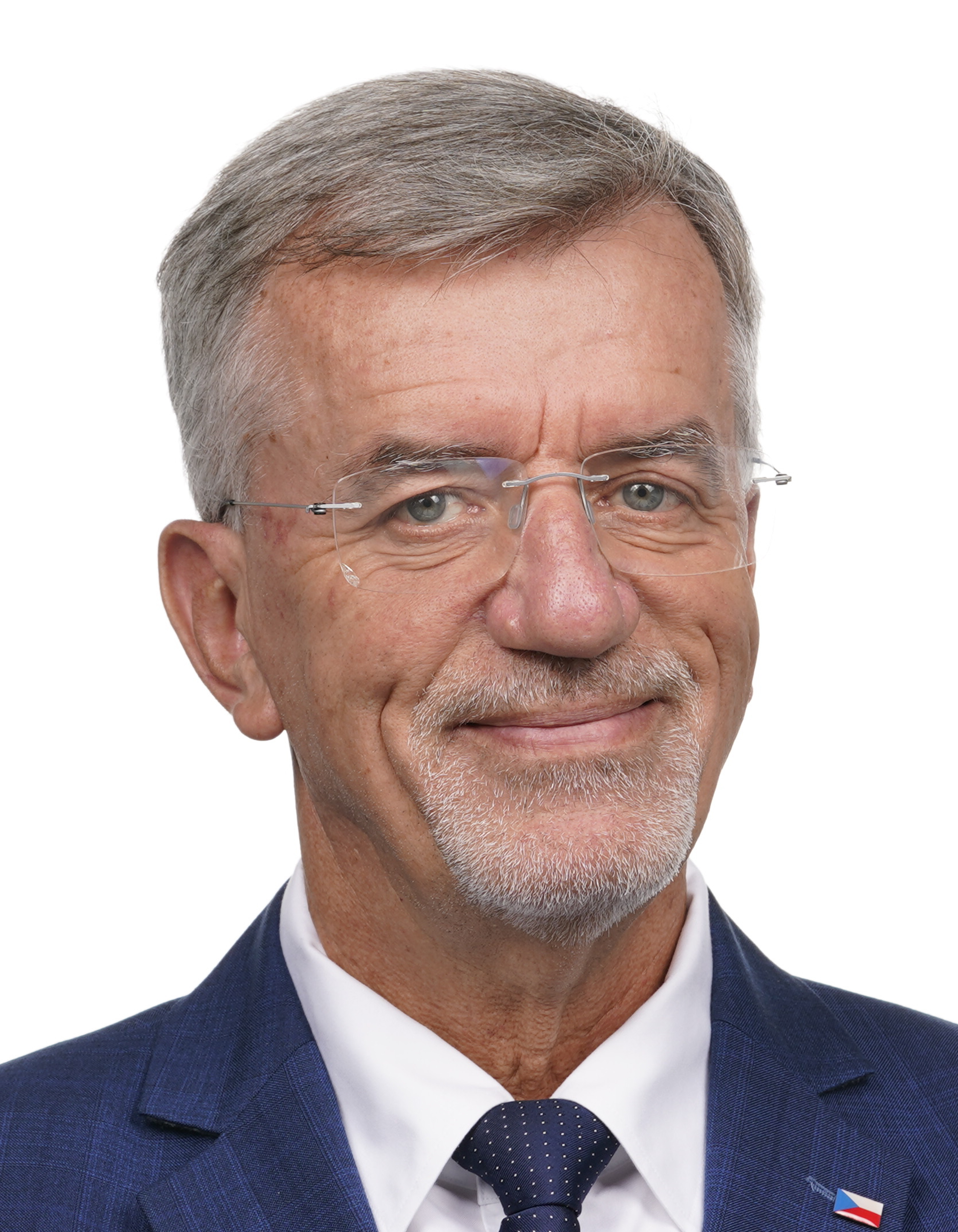
- Kubín in 2024

Member of the European Parliament for the Czech Republic
- Incumbent
- Assumed office 1 August 2024
- Preceded by: Martin Hlaváček

Personal details
- Born: 24 July 1962 (age 63) Jindřichův Hradec, Czechoslovakia
- Party: ANO
- Other political affiliations: Patriots for Europe
- Children: 5

Tomáš Kubín (born 24 July 1962) is a Czech politician of ANO serving as a member of the European Parliament since 2024. He succeeded Martin Hlaváček, who resigned for personal reasons. He is a municipal councillor of České Budějovice and served as a deputy mayor from 2002 to 2006.
