= Jorge Martín Frías =

Spanish politician (born 1980)

Jorge Martín Frías MEP
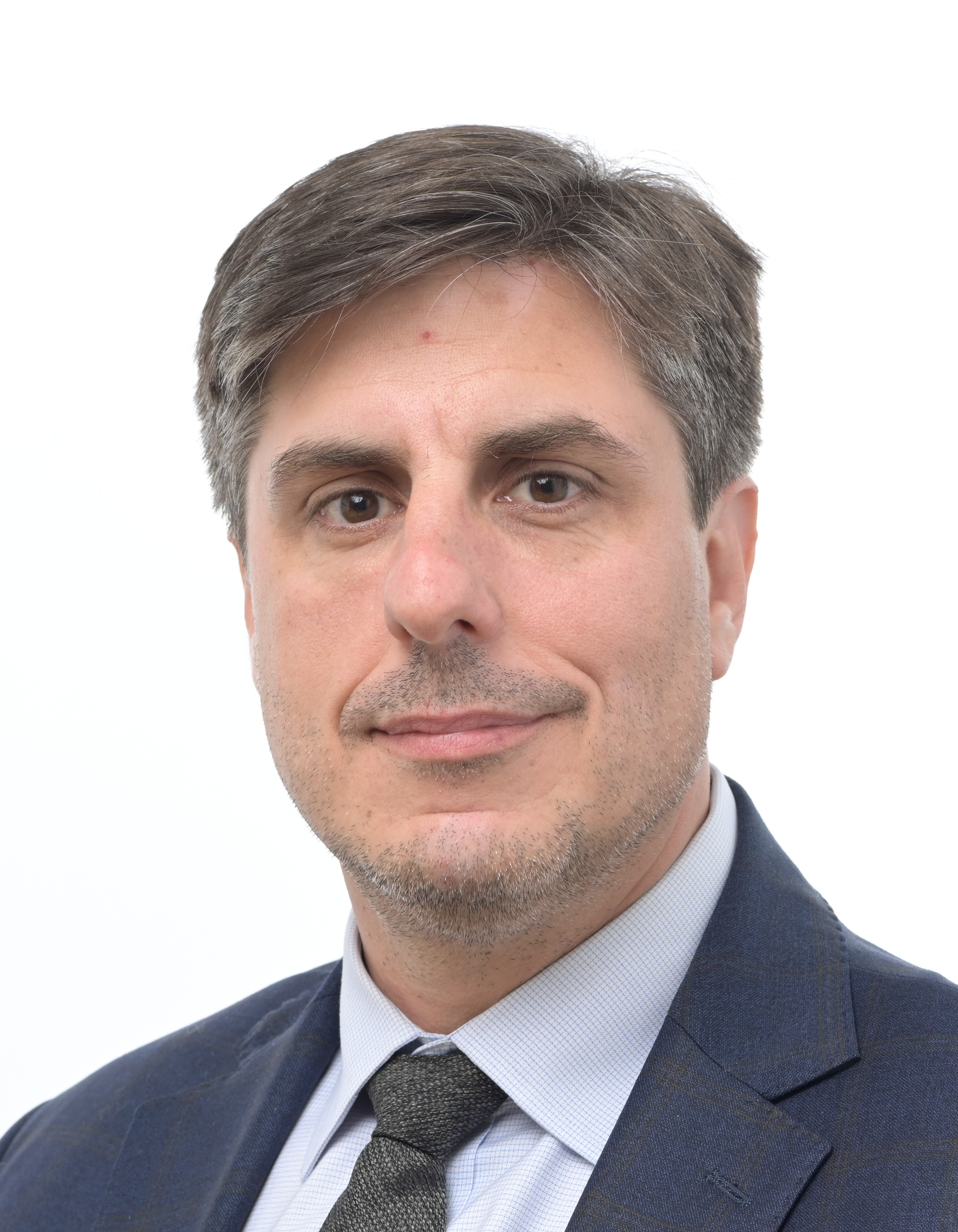
- Frias in 2024

Member of the European Parliament
- Incumbent
- Assumed office 16 July 2024
- Constituency: Spain

Personal details
- Born: 1980 (age 45–46) Alcalá de Henares
- Party: Vox
- Other political affiliations: Patriots for Europe

Jorge Martín Frías (Spanish pronunciation: [ˈxoɾxe maɾˈtiɱ ˈfɾi.as]; born 1980) is a Spanish politician of Vox who was elected member of the European Parliament in 2024. He has served as director of the party's think tank Disenso since 2020, and is a former head of training at FAES.

== Early life and career ==
Martín Frías was born in Alcalá de Henares in 1980. He studied philosophy and was advisor to the presidency of Asociación de Grandes Empresas de Trabajo Temporal, before working for the City Council of Madrid from 2010 to 2015.
