= Raúl de la Hoz Quintano =

Spanish politician (born 1973)

Raúl de la Hoz Quintano MEP
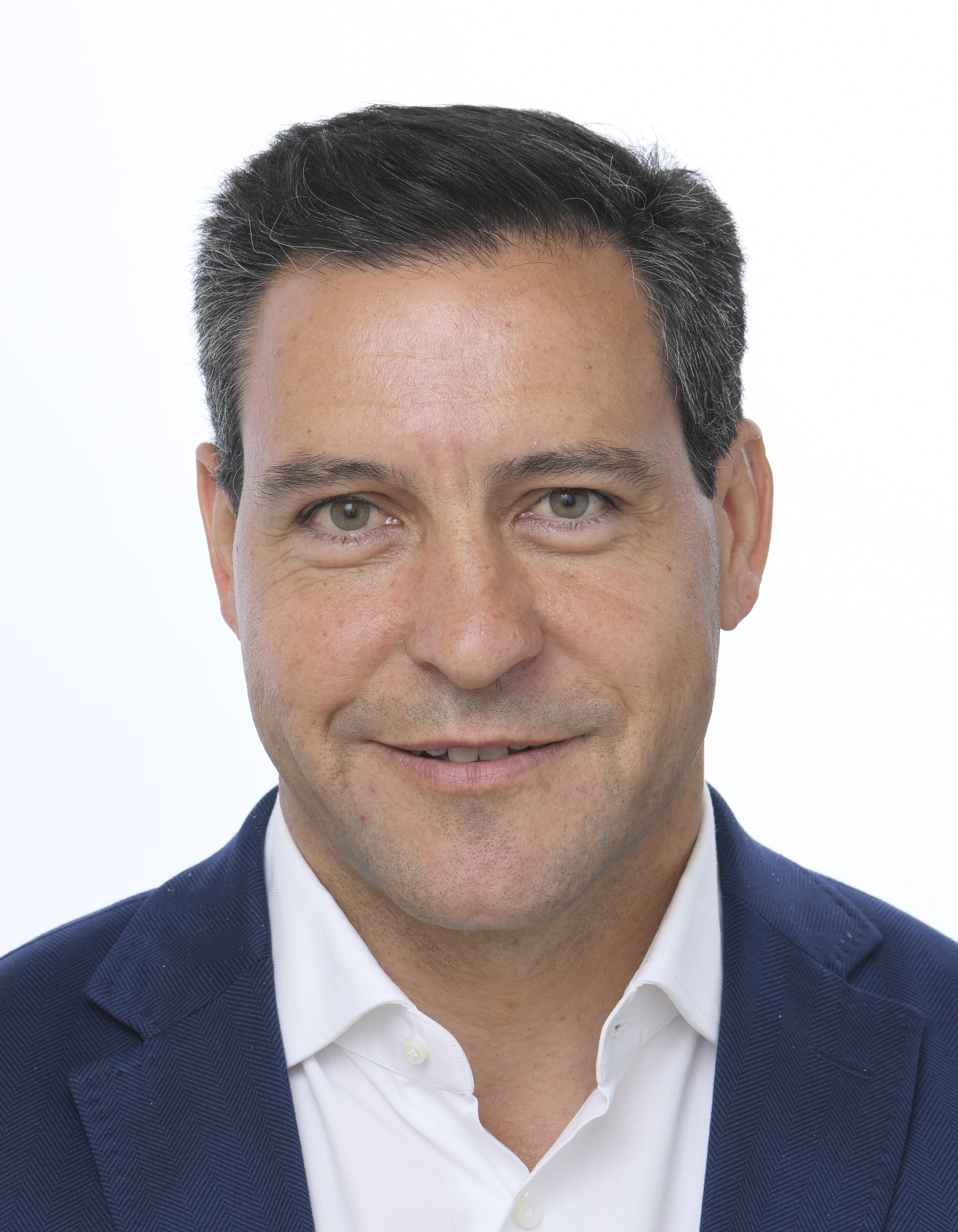

Member of the European Parliament for Spain
- Incumbent
- Assumed office 16 July 2024

Personal details
- Born: 4 May 1973 (age 52)
- Party: People's Party
- Other political affiliations: European People's Party

Raúl de la Hoz Quintano (Spanish pronunciation: [raˈul de la ˈoθ kinˈtano]; born 4 May 1973) is a Spanish politician of the People's Party who was elected member of the European Parliament in 2024. He served in the Cortes of Castile and León from 1999 to 2024.
