= Susana Solís Pérez =

Spanish politician

Susana Solís Pérez MEP
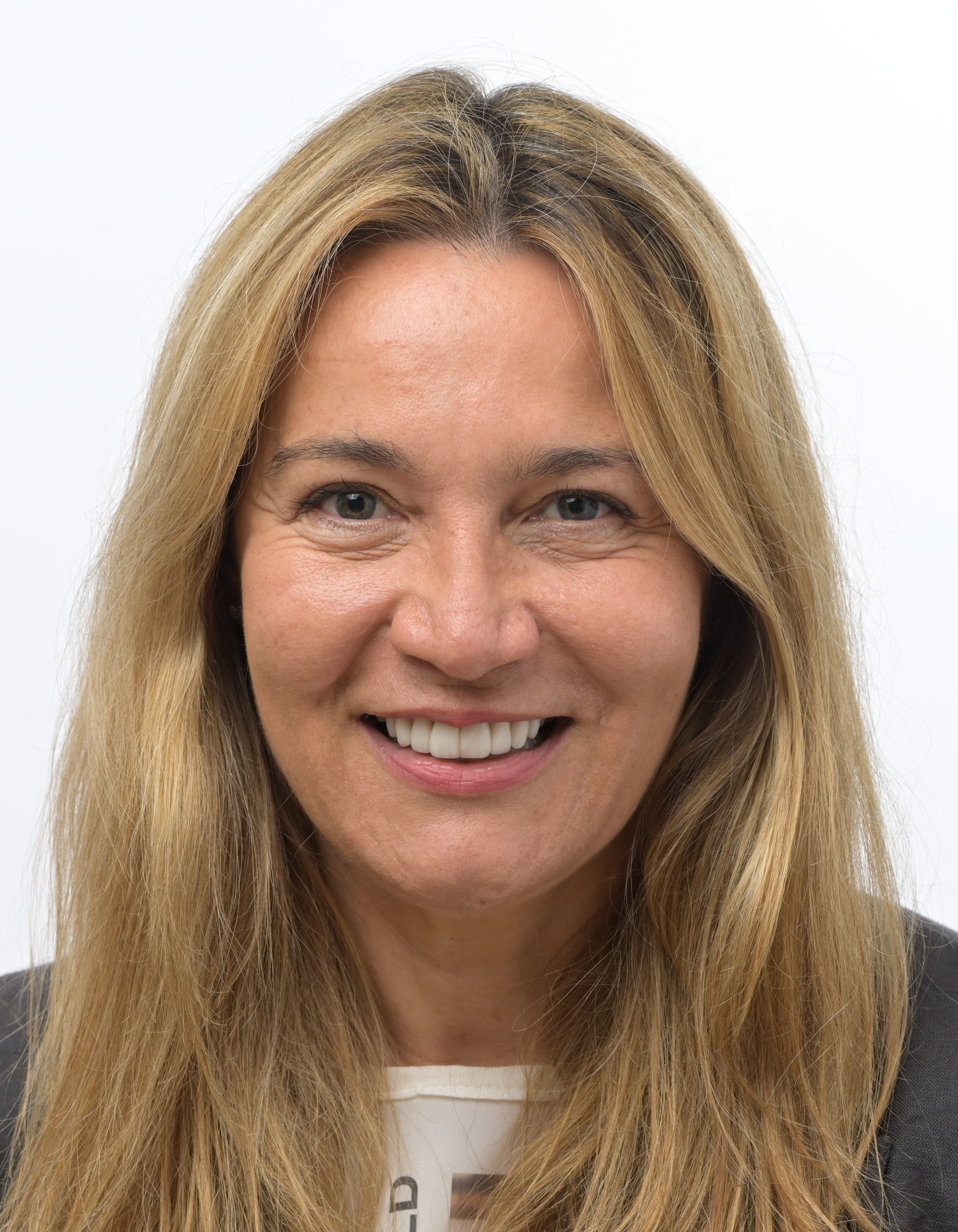

Member of the European Parliament for Spain
- Incumbent
- Assumed office 2 July 2019

Member of the Assembly of Madrid
- In office 9 June 2015 – 11 June 2019

Personal details
- Born: Susana Solís Pérez; 21 December 1971 (age 54) Avilés, Spain
- Party: People's Party (2024–present)
- Other political affiliations: Citizens (2015–2024)
- Education: University of Oviedo

Susana Solís Pérez (Avilés, 21 December 1971) is a Spanish industrial engineer and politician, currently serving as a Member of the European Parliament (MEP) for the People's Party.Education

Born in Avilés (Asturias), Solís holds a degree in Industrial Engineering from the University of Oviedo and a degree in Machine Engineering from the University of Applied Sciences of Osnabrück (Germany). She also earned an Executive MBA and a Master's in Marketing Management from IE University, as well as completing a Leadership Program in Public Management at IESE Business School.

Professional Career as an Engineer

Before entering politics, Solís accumulated over 20 years of experience in the private sector. In 1995, she began working as a Development Engineer at the Daimler Benz Research Center in Ulm (Germany) and later held various management roles at the German company Bosch.

She furthered her career with executive positions at Rexel Group and Essilor Spain, both French companies. From 2011 to 2015, she served as the Iberia manager for the multinational Johnson & Johnson.

Political Career

In 2015, Solís was elected to the Madrid Assembly as a deputy for Ciudadanos during its 10th legislature, following the party's success in securing 17 seats. During this term, she served as spokesperson for the Budget, Economy, Finance, and Employment Committee and for the Study Commission on Public Debt and Management of the Community of Madrid.

She also held roles as the secretary of the Education and Research Committee and as an alternate member of the Permanent Deputation. Solís introduced 403 parliamentary initiatives, making her the deputy with the most proposals within her group.

Within Ciudadanos, she was part of the National Executive Committee (2017–2019) and was responsible for Industry and R&D in the party's executive committee.

In the 2019 European elections, Solís was ranked 7th on Ciudadanos' list for the European Parliament. After the party won seven seats, she began her tenure as an MEP for the 9th European legislature, aligning with the liberal Renew Europe group.

During her five-year term, Solís served on several committees: Environment (ENVI), Industry, Research, and Energy (ITRE), Regional Development (REGI), Women's Rights and Gender Equality (FEMM), and the Subcommittee on Public Health. She was also vice-chair of the Delegation for Relations with the Korean Peninsula and a member of the Delegation for Relations with the United States.

Additionally, she participated in various intergroups, including those focused on European Industry, SMEs, Artificial Intelligence, Digital Policy, and Cancer.

Solís authored 34 reports (17 main and 17 alternate), submitted 68 written questions to the European Commission, and put forth 65 motions for resolutions. She was the second Spanish MEP in terms of the number of amendments presented (4,669), contributing to 140 dossiers and reports.

In the 9 June 2024 European elections, Susana Solís was ranked 15th on the People's Party list. With the party securing 22 seats, she was re-elected as an MEP for the European People's Party.

Currently, she serves on the Environment Committee (ENVI), the Industry, Research, and Energy Committee (ITRE), and the Internal Market and Consumer Protection Committee (IMCO).
