= Results of the 2019 European Parliament election in Spain =

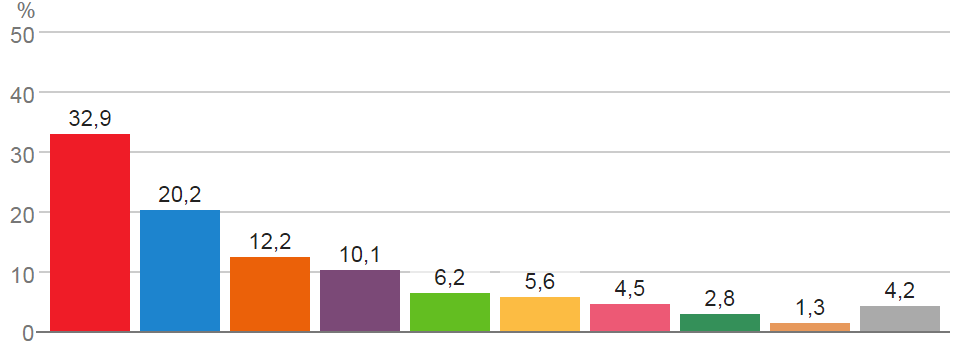
(Spain)	Main: 2019 European Parliament election in Spain
← 2014 26 May 2019 2024 →
Party		Votes	%	Seats
	PSOE	7,369,789	32.9%	21
	PP	4,519,205	20.2%	13
	Cs	2,731,825	12.2%	8
	Podemos–IU	2,258,857	10.1%	6
	Vox	1,393,684	6.2%	4
	Ahora Repúblicas	1,252,139	5.6%	3
	Junts	1,018,435	4.5%	3
	CEUS	633,090	2.8%	1
	CpE	296,491	1.3%	0
	Others	952,551	4.2%	0
Total		22,426,066	100.0%	59

This article presents the results breakdown of the election to the European Parliament held in Spain on 26 May 2019. The following tables show detailed results in each of the country's 17 autonomous communities and in the autonomous cities of Ceuta and Melilla.

== Nationwide ==
← Summary of the 26 May 2019 European Parliament election results in Spain →
Parties and alliances	Popular vote			Seats	
Parties and alliances	Votes	%	±pp	Total	+/−
Spanish Socialist Workers' Party (PSOE)^{1}	7,369,789	32.86	+9.85	21	+7
People's Party (PP)^{1}	4,519,205	20.15	−5.94	13	−3
Citizens–Party of the Citizenry (Cs)^{1} ^{2}	2,731,825	12.18	+2.51	8	+2
United We Can Change Europe (Podemos–IU)^{3}	2,258,857	10.07	−7.94	6	−5
Vox (Vox)^{1}	1,393,684	6.21	+4.64	4	+4
Republics Now (Ahora Repúblicas)^{4}	1,252,139	5.58	−0.51	3	±0
Free for Europe (Junts)^{1} ^{5}	1,018,435	4.54	+1.04	3	+1
Coalition for a Solidary Europe (CEUS)^{6}	633,090	2.82	+0.89	1	±0
Commitment to Europe (CpE)^{7}	296,491	1.32	−0.60	0	−1
Animalist Party Against Mistreatment of Animals (PACMA)	295,546	1.32	+0.19	0	±0
Green Coalition–Citizen Europe (CV–EC)	65,504	0.29	New	0	±0
Zero Cuts–The Greens–European Green Group (Recortes Cero–LV–GVE)	50,002	0.22	+0.02	0	±0
Volt Europa (Volt)	32,432	0.14	New	0	±0
Feminist Initiative (IFem)	29,276	0.13	−0.02	0	±0
Communists (PCPE–PCPC–PCPA)	28,508	0.13	−0.06	0	±0
Act (PACT)	25,528	0.11	New	0	±0
Andalusia by Herself (AxSí)^{8}	23,995	0.11	−0.21	0	±0
For a Fairer World (PUM+J)	21,584	0.10	New	0	±0
Communist Party of the Workers of Spain (PCTE)	19,080	0.09	New	0	±0
Pirates of Catalonia–European Pirates (pirates.cat/ep)	16,755	0.07	−0.18	0	±0
Centrists for Europe (CCD–Lliures–UIJ–centrados)	15,615	0.07	New	0	±0
Forum of Citizens (FAC)	14,175	0.06	−0.15	0	±0
Positive Left (IZQP)	12,939	0.06	New	0	±0
With You, We Are Democracy (Contigo)	12,430	0.06	New	0	±0
Extremadurans (CEx–CREx–PREx)	11,894	0.05	+0.01	0	±0
FE de las JONS–Spanish Alternative–La Falange–National Democracy (ADÑ)^{9}	11,699	0.05	−0.39	0	±0
Republican Alternative (ALTER)	11,076	0.05	±0.00	0	±0
Actual Equality (IGRE)	9,076	0.04	New	0	±0
Red Current Movement (MCR)	8,402	0.04	+0.01	0	±0
Humanist Party (PH)	7,947	0.04	−0.05	0	±0
Euro Latino Independent Movement (MIEL)	6,809	0.03	New	0	±0
Internationalist Solidarity and Self-Management (SAIn)	5,543	0.02	−0.02	0	±0
Blank ballots	216,736	0.97	−1.33		
Total^{1}	22,426,066			59	+5
Valid votes	22,426,066	99.14	+0.94		
Invalid votes	193,918	0.86	−0.94		
Votes cast / turnout	22,619,984	60.73	+16.92		
Abstentions	14,628,904	39.27	−16.92		
Registered voters	37,248,888				
Sources
Footnotes: ^{1} Initially, Spain was allocated 54 seats, which were distributed as follows: PSOE (20), PP (12), Cs (7), Podemos–IU (6), Vox (3), Ahora Repúblicas (3), Junts (2) and CEUS (1). However, as a result of Brexit, Spain's MEP delegation grew to 59, with the additional 5 seats being allocated to PSOE (1), PP (1), Cs (1), Vox (1) and Junts (1).; ^{2} Citizens–Party of the Citizenry results are compared to the combined totals of Union, Progress and Democracy and Citizens–Party of the Citizenry in the 2014 election.; ^{3} United We Can Change Europe results are compared to the combined totals of Plural Left and We Can in the 2014 election.; ^{4} Republics Now results are compared to the combined totals of The Left for the Right to Decide and The Peoples Decide in the 2014 election.; ^{5} Free for Europe results are compared to Coalition for Europe totals in Catalonia in the 2014 election.; ^{6} Coalition for a Solidary Europe results are compared to Coalition for Europe totals in the 2014 election, not including results in Catalonia.; ^{7} Commitment to Europe results are compared to European Spring totals in the 2014 election.; ^{8} Andalusia by Herself results are compared to Andalusian Party totals in the 2014 election.; ^{9} FE de las JONS–Spanish Alternative–La Falange–National Democracy results are compared to the combined totals of Spanish Phalanx of the CNSO, Social Impulse, Spain on the Move and National Democracy in the 2014 election.

== Autonomous communities ==
=== Andalusia ===
← Summary of the 26 May 2019 European Parliament election results in Andalusia →
Parties and alliances	Popular vote		
Parties and alliances	Votes	%	±pp
Spanish Socialist Workers' Party (PSOE)	1,547,896	40.53	+5.40
People's Party (PP)	849,771	22.25	−3.64
Citizens–Party of the Citizenry (Cs)^{1}	496,830	13.01	+4.13
United We Can Change Europe (Podemos–IU Andalucía)^{2}	442,917	11.60	−7.13
Vox (Vox)	288,748	7.56	+6.35
Animalist Party Against Mistreatment of Animals (PACMA)	54,817	1.44	+0.51
Andalusia by Herself (AxSí)^{3}	19,458	0.51	−1.19
Green Coalition–Citizen Europe (CV–EC)	8,865	0.23	New
Zero Cuts–The Greens–European Green Group (Recortes Cero–LV–GVE)	7,882	0.21	+0.05
Volt Europa (Volt)	6,545	0.17	New
Communists (PCPE–PCPC–PCPA)	6,194	0.16	−0.01
Act (PACT)	4,545	0.12	New
Feminist Initiative (IFem)	4,381	0.11	−0.01
For a Fairer World (PUM+J)	3,810	0.10	New
Commitment to Europe (CpE)^{4}	3,531	0.09	−0.86
Communist Party of the Workers of Spain (PCTE)	3,383	0.09	New
Coalition for a Solidary Europe (CEUS)^{5}	2,961	0.08	+0.04
Republics Now (Ahora Repúblicas)^{6}	2,846	0.07	−0.04
Positive Left (IZQP)	2,660	0.07	New
Centrists for Europe (CCD–Lliures–UIJ–centrados)	2,493	0.07	New
Free for Europe (Junts)	2,297	0.06	New
Republican Alternative (ALTER)	2,012	0.05	±0.00
Actual Equality (IGRE)	2,005	0.05	New
Red Current Movement (MCR)	1,994	0.05	+0.02
Pirates of Catalonia–European Pirates (pirates.cat/ep)	1,910	0.05	−0.10
FE de las JONS–Spanish Alternative–La Falange–National Democracy (ADÑ)^{7}	1,781	0.05	−0.30
With You, We Are Democracy (Contigo)	1,539	0.04	New
Forum of Citizens (FAC)	1,469	0.04	−0.06
Humanist Party (PH)	1,404	0.04	−0.04
Internationalist Solidarity and Self-Management (SAIn)	886	0.02	−0.03
Extremadurans (CEx–CREx–PREx)	823	0.02	±0.00
Euro Latino Independent Movement (MIEL)	782	0.02	New
Blank ballots	39,261	1.03	−1.66
Total	3,818,696		
Valid votes	3,818,696	98.61	+0.43
Invalid votes	53,831	1.39	−0.43
Votes cast / turnout	3,872,527	58.45	+16.60
Abstentions	2,753,090	41.55	−16.60
Registered voters	6,625,617		
Sources
Footnotes: ^{1} Citizens–Party of the Citizenry results are compared to the combined totals of Union, Progress and Democracy and Citizens–Party of the Citizenry in the 2014 election.; ^{2} United We Can Change Europe results are compared to the combined totals of United Left/The Greens–Assembly for Andalusia: Plural Left and We Can in the 2014 election.; ^{3} Andalusia by Herself results are compared to Andalusian Party totals in the 2014 election.; ^{4} Commitment to Europe results are compared to European Spring totals in the 2014 election.; ^{5} Coalition for a Solidary Europe results are compared to Coalition for Europe totals in the 2014 election.; ^{6} Republics Now results are compared to the combined totals of The Peoples Decide and The Left for the Right to Decide in the 2014 election.; ^{7} FE de las JONS–Spanish Alternative–La Falange–National Democracy results are compared to the combined totals of Spanish Phalanx of the CNSO, Social Impulse, Spain on the Move and National Democracy in the 2014 election.

=== Aragon ===
← Summary of the 26 May 2019 European Parliament election results in Aragon →
Parties and alliances	Popular vote		
Parties and alliances	Votes	%	±pp
Spanish Socialist Workers' Party (PSOE)	239,358	36.18	+11.85
People's Party (PP)	143,616	21.71	−6.16
Citizens–Party of the Citizenry (Cs)^{1}	114,566	17.32	+5.86
United We Can Change Europe (Podemos–IU)^{2}	68,493	10.35	−8.60
Vox (Vox)	52,309	7.91	+5.57
Aragonese Union (Commitment to Europe) (CHA)	13,241	2.00	−2.50
Animalist Party Against Mistreatment of Animals (PACMA)	6,746	1.02	−0.19
Green Coalition–Citizen Europe (CV–EC)	1,838	0.28	New
Republics Now–Puyalón de Cuchas (Agora Republicas–Puyalón)	1,805	0.27	±0.00
Zero Cuts–The Greens–European Green Group (Recortes Cero–LV–GVE)	1,572	0.24	+0.02
Free for Europe (Junts)	1,133	0.17	New
Volt Europa (Volt)	960	0.15	New
Feminist Initiative (IFem)	911	0.14	+0.03
Communists (PCPE–PCPC–PCPA)	875	0.13	−0.01
Republican Alternative (ALTER)	591	0.09	+0.05
Communist Party of the Workers of Spain (PCTE)	578	0.09	New
For a Fairer World (PUM+J)	557	0.08	New
Act (PACT)	511	0.08	New
Pirates of Catalonia–European Pirates (pirates.cat/ep)	505	0.08	−0.18
FE de las JONS–Spanish Alternative–La Falange–National Democracy (ADÑ)^{3}	433	0.07	−0.46
Positive Left (IZQP)	389	0.06	New
Forum of Citizens (FAC)	286	0.04	−0.05
Coalition for a Solidary Europe (CEUS)^{4}	255	0.04	−0.03
Extremadurans (CEx–CREx–PREx)	226	0.03	+0.01
Centrists for Europe (CCD–Lliures–UIJ–centrados)	194	0.03	New
Actual Equality (IGRE)	191	0.03	New
Humanist Party (PH)	181	0.03	−0.04
Red Current Movement (MCR)	169	0.03	+0.01
Euro Latino Independent Movement (MIEL)	148	0.02	New
Internationalist Solidarity and Self-Management (SAIn)	139	0.02	−0.01
With You, We Are Democracy (Contigo)	130	0.02	New
Andalusia by Herself (AxSí)^{5}	99	0.01	−0.01
Blank ballots	8,572	1.30	−1.73
Total	661,577		
Valid votes	661,577	99.23	+0.99
Invalid votes	5,147	0.77	−0.99
Votes cast / turnout	666,724	64.96	+19.23
Abstentions	359,698	35.04	−19.23
Registered voters	1,026,422		
Sources
Footnotes: ^{1} Citizens–Party of the Citizenry results are compared to the combined totals of Union, Progress and Democracy and Citizens–Party of the Citizenry in the 2014 election.; ^{2} United We Can Change Europe results are compared to the combined totals of We Can and United Left of Aragon: Plural Left in the 2014 election.; ^{3} FE de las JONS–Spanish Alternative–La Falange–National Democracy results are compared to the combined totals of Spanish Phalanx of the CNSO, Spain on the Move, National Democracy and Social Impulse in the 2014 election.; ^{4} Coalition for a Solidary Europe results are compared to Coalition for Europe totals in the 2014 election.; ^{5} Andalusia by Herself results are compared to Andalusian Party totals in the 2014 election.

=== Asturias ===
← Summary of the 26 May 2019 European Parliament election results in Asturias →
Parties and alliances	Popular vote		
Parties and alliances	Votes	%	±pp
Spanish Socialist Workers' Party (PSOE)	201,642	38.58	+12.50
People's Party (PP)	99,370	19.01	−5.20
United We Can Change Europe (Podemos–IX)^{1}	76,949	14.72	−11.82
Citizens–Party of the Citizenry (Cs)^{2}	70,997	13.58	+5.07
Vox (Vox)	38,913	7.45	+6.15
Forum of Citizens (FAC)	6,071	1.16	−3.07
Animalist Party Against Mistreatment of Animals (PACMA)	6,060	1.16	+0.15
Andecha Astur–Republics Now (Andecha–Agora Repúbliques)	1,902	0.36	−0.01
Act (PACT)	1,888	0.36	New
Zero Cuts–The Greens–European Green Group (Recortes Cero–LV–GVE)	1,514	0.29	+0.11
Volt Europa (Volt)	1,291	0.25	New
Green Coalition–Citizen Europe (CV–EC)	1,262	0.24	New
Communist Party of the Workers of Spain (PCTE)	1,077	0.21	New
Communists (PCPE–PCPC–PCPA)	907	0.17	−0.06
Positive Left (IZQP)	749	0.14	New
Feminist Initiative (IFem)	630	0.12	+0.01
Free for Europe (Junts)	575	0.11	New
Commitment to Europe (CpE)^{3}	447	0.09	−0.87
For a Fairer World (PUM+J)	424	0.08	New
Coalition for a Solidary Europe (CEUS)^{4}	327	0.06	+0.02
Pirates of Catalonia–European Pirates (pirates.cat/ep)	310	0.06	−0.08
FE de las JONS–Spanish Alternative–La Falange–National Democracy (ADÑ)^{5}	254	0.05	−0.26
Actual Equality (IGRE)	242	0.05	New
Republican Alternative (ALTER)	241	0.05	−0.01
Red Current Movement (MCR)	195	0.04	+0.02
Humanist Party (PH)	190	0.04	−0.03
Centrists for Europe (CCD–Lliures–UIJ–centrados)	188	0.04	New
With You, We Are Democracy (Contigo)	168	0.03	New
Internationalist Solidarity and Self-Management (SAIn)	146	0.03	−0.02
Extremadurans (CEx–CREx–PREx)	98	0.02	+0.01
Euro Latino Independent Movement (MIEL)	90	0.02	New
Andalusia by Herself (AxSí)^{6}	76	0.01	±0.00
Blank ballots	7,440	1.42	−1.11
Total	522,633		
Valid votes	522,633	99.13	+0.66
Invalid votes	4,564	0.87	−0.66
Votes cast / turnout	527,197	54.10	+15.13
Abstentions	447,360	45.90	−15.13
Registered voters	974,557		
Sources
Footnotes: ^{1} United We Can Change Europe results are compared to the combined totals of We Can and United Left of Asturias: Plural Left in the 2014 election.; ^{2} Citizens–Party of the Citizenry results are compared to the combined totals of Union, Progress and Democracy and Citizens–Party of the Citizenry in the 2014 election.; ^{3} Republics Now results are compared to the combined totals of The Peoples Decide and The Left for the Right to Decide in the 2014 election.; ^{3} Commitment to Europe results are compared to European Spring totals in the 2014 election.; ^{4} Coalition for a Solidary Europe results are compared to Coalition for Europe totals in the 2014 election.; ^{5} FE de las JONS–Spanish Alternative–La Falange–National Democracy results are compared to the combined totals of Spanish Phalanx of the CNSO, National Democracy, Social Impulse and Spain on the Move in the 2014 election.; ^{6} Andalusia by Herself results are compared to Andalusian Party totals in the 2014 election.

=== Balearic Islands ===
← Summary of the 26 May 2019 European Parliament election results in the Balearic Islands →
Parties and alliances	Popular vote		
Parties and alliances	Votes	%	±pp
Spanish Socialist Workers' Party (PSOE)	122,532	29.34	+7.31
People's Party (PP)	88,432	21.18	−6.30
Citizens–Party of the Citizenry (Cs)^{1}	49,369	11.82	+2.84
United We Can Change Europe (Podemos–EUIB)^{2}	43,841	10.50	−8.70
Vox (Vox)	31,983	7.66	+6.13
Republican Left–Republics Now (ER–Ara Repúbliques)	20,464	4.90	−2.36
El Pi–Proposal for the Isles (Coalition for a Solidary Europe) (El Pi)	15,993	3.83	New
More for Majorca (Commitment to Europe) (Més)	12,447	2.98	New
Free for Europe (Junts)	10,558	2.53	New
Animalist Party Against Mistreatment of Animals (PACMA)	6,763	1.62	−0.01
Green Coalition–Citizen Europe (CV–EC)	1,817	0.44	New
Zero Cuts–The Greens–European Green Group (Recortes Cero–LV–GVE)	954	0.23	−0.01
Act (PACT)	917	0.22	New
Volt Europa (Volt)	841	0.20	New
Feminist Initiative (IFem)	693	0.17	−0.07
With You, We Are Democracy (Contigo)	527	0.13	New
Communists (PCPE–PCPC–PCPA)	407	0.10	−0.09
Republican Alternative (ALTER)	392	0.09	+0.01
Pirates of Catalonia–European Pirates (pirates.cat/ep)	376	0.09	−0.20
Communist Party of the Workers of Spain (PCTE)	330	0.08	New
For a Fairer World (PUM+J)	313	0.07	New
Humanist Party (PH)	241	0.06	−0.10
Andalusia by Herself (AxSí)^{3}	234	0.06	−0.01
Red Current Movement (MCR)	218	0.05	+0.02
FE de las JONS–Spanish Alternative–La Falange–National Democracy (ADÑ)^{4}	213	0.05	−0.46
Centrists for Europe (CCD–Lliures–UIJ–centrados)	211	0.05	New
Positive Left (IZQP)	205	0.05	New
Euro Latino Independent Movement (MIEL)	178	0.04	New
Actual Equality (IGRE)	177	0.04	New
Forum of Citizens (FAC)	173	0.04	−0.09
Extremadurans (CEx–CREx–PREx)	141	0.03	±0.00
Internationalist Solidarity and Self-Management (SAIn)	97	0.02	−0.01
Blank ballots	5,566	1.33	−0.99
Total	417,603		
Valid votes	417,603	98.93	+0.63
Invalid votes	4,547	1.07	−0.63
Votes cast / turnout	422,150	51.52	+15.92
Abstentions	397,245	48.48	−15.92
Registered voters	819,395		
Sources
Footnotes: ^{1} Citizens–Party of the Citizenry results are compared to the combined totals of Union, Progress and Democracy and Citizens–Party of the Citizenry in the 2014 election.; ^{2} United We Can Change Europe results are compared to the combined totals of We Can and United Left of the Balearic Islands: Plural Left in the 2014 election.; ^{3} Andalusia by Herself results are compared to Andalusian Party totals in the 2014 election.; ^{4} FE de las JONS–Spanish Alternative–La Falange–National Democracy results are compared to the combined totals of Spanish Phalanx of the CNSO, Social Impulse, Spain on the Move and National Democracy in the 2014 election.

=== Basque Country ===
← Summary of the 26 May 2019 European Parliament election results in the Basque Country →
Parties and alliances	Popular vote		
Parties and alliances	Votes	%	±pp
Basque Nationalist Party (Coalition for a Solidary Europe) (EAJ/PNV)	380,577	33.92	+6.44
Basque Country Gather–Republics Now (EH Bildu–Orain Errepublikak)	246,937	22.01	−1.35
Socialist Party of the Basque Country–Basque Country Left (PSE–EE (PSOE))	212,881	18.98	+5.17
United We Can Change Europe (Podemos–IU)^{1}	124,115	11.06	−1.41
People's Party (PP)	72,274	6.44	−3.76
Citizens–Party of the Citizenry (Cs)^{2}	30,464	2.72	−1.40
Vox (Vox)	13,726	1.22	+0.67
Animalist Party Against Mistreatment of Animals (PACMA)	9,323	0.83	−0.04
Free for Europe (Junts)	5,073	0.45	New
Green Coalition–Citizen Europe (CV–EC)	3,303	0.29	New
Zero Cuts–The Greens–European Green Group (Recortes Cero–LV–GVE)	2,078	0.19	−0.08
Feminist Initiative (IFem)	1,569	0.14	−0.01
Communists (PCPE–PCPC–PCPA)	1,189	0.11	−0.04
Centrists for Europe (CCD–Lliures–UIJ–centrados)	1,186	0.11	New
For a Fairer World (PUM+J)	936	0.08	New
Republican Alternative (ALTER)	867	0.08	+0.03
Commitment to Europe (CpE)^{3}	851	0.08	−1.47
Communist Party of the Workers of the Basque Country (PCTE/ELAK)	785	0.07	New
Volt Europa (Volt)	696	0.06	New
Pirates of Catalonia–European Pirates (pirates.cat/ep)	636	0.06	−0.14
Act (PACT)	490	0.04	New
With You, We Are Democracy (Contigo)	486	0.04	New
Positive Left (IZQP)	391	0.03	New
Humanist Party (PH)	322	0.03	−0.05
Extremadurans (CEx–CREx–PREx)	282	0.03	+0.01
Actual Equality (IGRE)	274	0.02	New
FE de las JONS–Spanish Alternative–La Falange–National Democracy (ADÑ)^{4}	232	0.02	−0.14
Red Current Movement (MCR)	209	0.02	±0.00
Euro Latino Independent Movement (MIEL)	195	0.02	New
Internationalist Solidarity and Self-Management (SAIn)	180	0.02	±0.00
Forum of Citizens (FAC)	177	0.02	−0.08
Andalusia by Herself (AxSí)^{5}	167	0.01	±0.00
Blank ballots	8,948	0.80	−0.91
Total	1,121,819		
Valid votes	1,121,819	99.43	+0.49
Invalid votes	6,443	0.57	−0.49
Votes cast / turnout	1,128,262	62.89	+19.79
Abstentions	665,755	37.11	−19.79
Registered voters	1,794,017		
Sources
Footnotes: ^{1} United We Can Change Europe results are compared to the combined totals of We Can and United Left–Awake: Plural Left in the 2014 election.; ^{2} Citizens–Party of the Citizenry results are compared to the combined totals of Union, Progress and Democracy and Citizens–Party of the Citizenry in the 2014 election.; ^{3} Commitment to Europe results are compared to European Spring totals in the 2014 election.; ^{4} FE de las JONS–Spanish Alternative–La Falange–National Democracy results are compared to the combined totals of Social Impulse, National Democracy, Spanish Phalanx of the CNSO and Spain on the Move in the 2014 election.; ^{5} Andalusia by Herself results are compared to Andalusian Party totals in the 2014 election.

=== Canary Islands ===
← Summary of the 26 May 2019 European Parliament election results in the Canary Islands →
Parties and alliances	Popular vote		
Parties and alliances	Votes	%	±pp
Spanish Socialist Workers' Party (PSOE)	287,033	32.01	+9.79
Canarian Coalition–Canarian Nationalist Party (CEUS) (CCa–PNC)	186,372	20.79	+8.61
People's Party (PP)	141,933	15.83	−7.60
United We Can Change Europe (Podemos–IU)^{1}	93,329	10.41	−11.04
Citizens–Party of the Citizenry (Cs)^{2}	68,025	7.59	−0.73
New Canaries (Commitment to Europe) (NCa)	38,295	4.27	New
Vox (Vox)	29,683	3.31	+2.47
Animalist Party Against Mistreatment of Animals (PACMA)	14,852	1.66	−0.19
Green Coalition–Citizen Europe (CV–EC)	3,322	0.37	New
Zero Cuts–The Greens–European Green Group (Recortes Cero–LV–GVE)	3,208	0.36	+0.06
Canaries Now–Republics Now (ANC–UP–Ahora Repúblicas)^{3}	2,460	0.27	−0.33
Free for Europe (Junts)	1,818	0.20	New
Feminist Initiative (IFem)	1,413	0.16	−0.11
Communists (PCPE–PCPC–PCPA)	1,197	0.13	−0.19
Volt Europa (Volt)	1,154	0.13	New
For a Fairer World (PUM+J)	1,056	0.12	New
With You, We Are Democracy (Contigo)	832	0.09	New
Republican Alternative (ALTER)	762	0.08	−0.02
Act (PACT)	670	0.07	New
Forum of Citizens (FAC)	616	0.07	−0.09
Red Current Movement (MCR)	599	0.07	+0.01
Communist Party of the Workers of Spain (PCTE)	578	0.06	New
Euro Latino Independent Movement (MIEL)	559	0.06	New
Actual Equality (IGRE)	553	0.06	New
Pirates of Catalonia–European Pirates (pirates.cat/ep)	539	0.06	−0.14
Humanist Party (PH)	473	0.05	−0.16
Positive Left (IZQP)	444	0.05	New
Centrists for Europe (CCD–Lliures–UIJ–centrados)	403	0.04	New
FE de las JONS–Spanish Alternative–La Falange–National Democracy (ADÑ)^{4}	403	0.04	−0.36
Extremadurans (CEx–CREx–PREx)	392	0.04	+0.01
Internationalist Solidarity and Self-Management (SAIn)	272	0.03	−0.04
Andalusia by Herself (AxSí)^{5}	265	0.03	−0.01
Blank ballots	13,097	1.46	−0.82
Total	896,607		
Valid votes	896,607	99.04	+1.20
Invalid votes	8,647	0.96	−1.20
Votes cast / turnout	905,254	51.43	+16.47
Abstentions	854,966	48.57	−16.47
Registered voters	1,760,220		
Sources
Footnotes: ^{1} United We Can Change Europe results are compared to the combined totals of We Can and Canarian United Left–The Greens: Plural Left in the 2014 election.; ^{2} Citizens–Party of the Citizenry results are compared to the combined totals of Union, Progress and Democracy and Citizens–Party of the Citizenry in the 2014 election.; ^{3} Canaries Now–Republics Now results are compared to Canarian Nationalist Alternative–Unity of the People (LPD) totals in the 2014 election.; ^{4} FE de las JONS–Spanish Alternative–La Falange–National Democracy results are compared to the combined totals of Social Impulse, Spanish Phalanx of the CNSO, Spain on the Move and National Democracy in the 2014 election.; ^{5} Andalusia by Herself results are compared to Andalusian Party totals in the 2014 election.

=== Cantabria ===
← Summary of the 26 May 2019 European Parliament election results in Cantabria →
Parties and alliances	Popular vote		
Parties and alliances	Votes	%	±pp
Spanish Socialist Workers' Party (PSOE)	117,508	37.52	+13.21
People's Party (PP)	84,760	27.06	−7.66
Citizens–Party of the Citizenry (Cs)^{1}	43,730	13.96	+2.78
United We Can Change Europe (Podemos–IU)^{2}	26,793	8.55	−9.64
Vox (Vox)	21,381	6.83	+5.03
Animalist Party Against Mistreatment of Animals (PACMA)	4,271	1.36	+0.25
Green Coalition–Citizen Europe (CV–EC)	958	0.31	New
Zero Cuts–The Greens–European Green Group (Recortes Cero–LV–GVE)	801	0.26	+0.09
Coalition for a Solidary Europe (CEUS)^{3}	777	0.25	+0.08
Communists (PCPE–PCPC–PCPA)	650	0.21	−0.02
Republics Now (Ahora Repúblicas)^{4}	631	0.20	−0.07
Communist Party of the Workers of Spain (PCTE)	501	0.16	New
Volt Europa (Volt)	450	0.14	New
Feminist Initiative (IFem)	432	0.14	−0.01
For a Fairer World (PUM+J)	305	0.10	New
Commitment to Europe (CpE)^{5}	292	0.09	−1.21
Act (PACT)	281	0.09	New
Pirates of Catalonia–European Pirates (pirates.cat/ep)	256	0.08	−0.08
Free for Europe (Junts)	254	0.08	New
Positive Left (IZQP)	248	0.08	New
With You, We Are Democracy (Contigo)	242	0.08	New
Red Current Movement (MCR)	207	0.07	+0.05
FE de las JONS–Spanish Alternative–La Falange–National Democracy (ADÑ)^{6}	196	0.06	−0.48
Centrists for Europe (CCD–Lliures–UIJ–centrados)	195	0.06	New
Humanist Party (PH)	180	0.06	−0.04
Republican Alternative (ALTER)	168	0.05	−0.02
Actual Equality (IGRE)	154	0.05	New
Internationalist Solidarity and Self-Management (SAIn)	138	0.04	−0.06
Forum of Citizens (FAC)	134	0.04	−0.16
Euro Latino Independent Movement (MIEL)	127	0.04	New
Extremadurans (CEx–CREx–PREx)	95	0.03	+0.01
Andalusia by Herself (AxSí)^{7}	92	0.03	+0.02
Blank ballots	5,989	1.91	−0.59
Total	313,196		
Valid votes	313,196	98.71	+1.39
Invalid votes	4,097	1.29	−1.39
Votes cast / turnout	317,293	62.95	+18.85
Abstentions	186,709	37.05	−18.85
Registered voters	504,002		
Sources
Footnotes: ^{1} Citizens–Party of the Citizenry results are compared to the combined totals of Union, Progress and Democracy and Citizens–Party of the Citizenry in the 2014 election.; ^{2} United We Can Change Europe results are compared to the combined totals of United Left of Cantabria: Plural Left and We Can in the 2014 election.; ^{3} Coalition for a Solidary Europe results are compared to Coalition for Europe totals in the 2014 election.; ^{4} Republics Now results are compared to the combined totals of The Peoples Decide and The Left for the Right to Decide in the 2014 election.; ^{5} Commitment to Europe results are compared to European Spring totals in the 2014 election.; ^{6} FE de las JONS–Spanish Alternative–La Falange–National Democracy results are compared to the combined totals of Social Impulse, Spanish Phalanx of the CNSO, Spain on the Move and National Democracy in the 2014 election.; ^{7} Andalusia by Herself results are compared to Andalusian Party totals in the 2014 election.

=== Castile and León ===
← Summary of the 26 May 2019 European Parliament election results in Castile and León →
Parties and alliances	Popular vote		
Parties and alliances	Votes	%	±pp
Spanish Socialist Workers' Party (PSOE)	474,264	35.03	+11.66
People's Party (PP)	408,170	30.15	−7.36
Citizens–Party of the Citizenry (Cs)^{1}	203,940	15.06	+4.07
United We Can Change Europe (Podemos–IU)^{2}	109,241	8.07	−8.37
Vox (Vox)	97,154	7.18	+4.69
Animalist Party Against Mistreatment of Animals (PACMA)	11,580	0.86	+0.13
Green Coalition–Citizen Europe (CV–EC)	3,858	0.28	New
Zero Cuts–The Greens–European Green Group (Recortes Cero–LV–GVE)	2,550	0.19	+0.04
Feminist Initiative (IFem)	1,823	0.13	−0.01
Volt Europa (Volt)	1,811	0.13	New
Republics Now (Ahora Repúblicas)^{3}	1,610	0.12	−0.06
Communists (PCPE–PCPC–PCPA)	1,595	0.12	−0.03
Act (PACT)	1,493	0.11	New
Communist Party of the Workers of Spain (PCTE)	1,485	0.11	New
For a Fairer World (PUM+J)	1,320	0.10	New
Centrists for Europe (CCD–Lliures–UIJ–centrados)	1,183	0.09	New
Coalition for a Solidary Europe (CEUS)^{4}	1,168	0.09	±0.00
Commitment to Europe (CpE)^{5}	1,037	0.08	−0.82
Republican Alternative (ALTER)	986	0.07	+0.02
Pirates of Catalonia–European Pirates (pirates.cat/ep)	954	0.07	−0.09
Free for Europe (Junts)	872	0.06	New
FE de las JONS–Spanish Alternative–La Falange–National Democracy (ADÑ)^{6}	867	0.06	−0.48
Positive Left (IZQP)	816	0.06	New
With You, We Are Democracy (Contigo)	766	0.06	New
Forum of Citizens (FAC)	659	0.05	−0.19
Internationalist Solidarity and Self-Management (SAIn)	659	0.05	−0.04
Actual Equality (IGRE)	650	0.05	New
Red Current Movement (MCR)	528	0.04	+0.01
Humanist Party (PH)	453	0.03	−0.06
Extremadurans (CEx–CREx–PREx)	352	0.03	+0.01
Euro Latino Independent Movement (MIEL)	267	0.02	New
Andalusia by Herself (AxSí)^{7}	242	0.02	±0.00
Blank ballots	19,445	1.44	−1.71
Total	1,353,798		
Valid votes	1,353,798	98.96	+1.48
Invalid votes	14,241	1.04	−1.48
Votes cast / turnout	1,368,039	64.51	+18.59
Abstentions	752,533	35.49	−18.59
Registered voters	2,120,572		
Sources
Footnotes: ^{1} Citizens–Party of the Citizenry results are compared to the combined totals of Union, Progress and Democracy and Citizens–Party of the Citizenry in the 2014 election.; ^{2} United We Can Change Europe results are compared to the combined totals of United Left of Castile and León: Plural Left and We Can in the 2014 election.; ^{3} Republics Now results are compared to the combined totals of The Peoples Decide and The Left for the Right to Decide in the 2014 election.; ^{4} Coalition for a Solidary Europe results are compared to Coalition for Europe totals in the 2014 election.; ^{5} Commitment to Europe results are compared to European Spring totals in the 2014 election.; ^{6} FE de las JONS–Spanish Alternative–La Falange–National Democracy results are compared to the combined totals of Spanish Phalanx of the CNSO, National Democracy Spain on the Move and Social Impulse in the 2014 election.; ^{7} Andalusia by Herself results are compared to Andalusian Party totals in the 2014 election.

=== Castilla–La Mancha ===
← Summary of the 26 May 2019 European Parliament election results in Castilla–La Mancha →
Parties and alliances	Popular vote		
Parties and alliances	Votes	%	±pp
Spanish Socialist Workers' Party (PSOE)	434,292	40.46	+11.70
People's Party (PP)	296,290	27.61	−10.12
Citizens–Party of the Citizenry (Cs)^{1}	130,937	12.20	+2.78
Vox (Vox)	88,112	8.21	+6.75
United We Can Change Europe (Podemos–IU)^{2}	81,364	7.58	−7.44
Animalist Party Against Mistreatment of Animals (PACMA)	11,009	1.03	+0.10
Zero Cuts–The Greens–European Green Group (Recortes Cero–LV–GVE)	2,223	0.21	+0.07
Green Coalition–Citizen Europe (CV–EC)	1,991	0.19	New
Centrists for Europe (CCD–Lliures–UIJ–centrados)	1,694	0.16	New
Volt Europa (Volt)	1,402	0.13	New
Feminist Initiative (IFem)	1,138	0.11	−0.02
Communists (PCPE–PCPC–PCPA)	1,046	0.10	−0.05
For a Fairer World (PUM+J)	821	0.08	New
Coalition for a Solidary Europe (CEUS)^{3}	797	0.07	±0.00
Communist Party of the Workers of Spain (PCTE)	789	0.07	New
Act (PACT)	774	0.07	New
Republics Now (Ahora Repúblicas)^{4}	764	0.07	−0.03
Commitment to Europe (CpE)^{5}	727	0.07	−0.73
FE de las JONS–Spanish Alternative–La Falange–National Democracy (ADÑ)^{6}	707	0.07	−0.51
With You, We Are Democracy (Contigo)	570	0.05	New
Free for Europe (Junts)	567	0.05	New
Pirates of Catalonia–European Pirates (pirates.cat/ep)	473	0.04	−0.08
Actual Equality (IGRE)	439	0.04	New
Extremadurans (CEx–CREx–PREx)	380	0.04	+0.01
Positive Left (IZQP)	373	0.03	New
Forum of Citizens (FAC)	334	0.03	−0.06
Republican Alternative (ALTER)	322	0.03	−0.02
Humanist Party (PH)	285	0.03	−0.05
Red Current Movement (MCR)	283	0.03	+0.01
Euro Latino Independent Movement (MIEL)	201	0.02	New
Andalusia by Herself (AxSí)^{7}	193	0.02	±0.00
Internationalist Solidarity and Self-Management (SAIn)	181	0.02	±0.00
Blank ballots	11,795	1.10	−1.18
Total	1,073,273		
Valid votes	1,073,273	98.86	+1.48
Invalid votes	12,342	1.14	−1.48
Votes cast / turnout	1,085,615	68.65	+22.22
Abstentions	495,796	31.35	−22.22
Registered voters	1,581,411		
Sources
Footnotes: ^{1} Citizens–Party of the Citizenry results are compared to the combined totals of Union, Progress and Democracy and Citizens–Party of the Citizenry in the 2014 election.; ^{2} United We Can Change Europe results are compared to the combined totals of United Left of Castilla–La Mancha–The Greens: Plural Left and We Can in the 2014 election.; ^{3} Coalition for a Solidary Europe results are compared to Coalition for Europe totals in the 2014 election.; ^{4} Republics Now results are compared to the combined totals of The Peoples Decide and The Left for the Right to Decide in the 2014 election.; ^{5} Commitment to Europe results are compared to European Spring totals in the 2014 election.; ^{6} FE de las JONS–Spanish Alternative–La Falange–National Democracy results are compared to the combined totals of Spanish Phalanx of the CNSO, Spain on the Move, Social Impulse and National Democracy in the 2014 election.; ^{7} Andalusia by Herself results are compared to Andalusian Party totals in the 2014 election.

=== Catalonia ===
← Summary of the 26 May 2019 European Parliament election results in Catalonia →
Parties and alliances	Popular vote		
Parties and alliances	Votes	%	±pp
Together for Catalonia–Free for Europe (JxCat–Junts)^{1}	981,357	28.63	+6.79
Socialists' Party of Catalonia (PSC–PSOE)	756,231	22.06	+7.77
Republican Left of Catalonia–Republics Now (ERC–Ara Repúbliques)	727,039	21.21	−2.48
Citizens–Party of the Citizenry (Cs)^{2}	295,435	8.62	+1.04
Catalonia in Common–We Can (CeC–Podemos)^{3}	288,393	8.41	−6.55
People's Party (PP)	176,752	5.16	−4.65
Vox (Vox)	68,286	1.99	+1.68
Animalist Party Against Mistreatment of Animals (PACMA)	48,229	1.41	+0.14
Green Coalition–Citizen Europe (CV–EC)	11,535	0.34	New
Zero Cuts–The Greens–European Green Group (Recortes Cero–LV–GVE)	6,989	0.20	+0.03
Pirates of Catalonia–European Pirates (pirates.cat/ep)	4,882	0.14	−0.32
Communists (PCPE–PCPC–PCPA)	4,679	0.14	−0.03
Feminist Initiative (IFem)	4,599	0.13	−0.02
United to Advance (Coalition for a Solidary Europe) (Els Units)	3,957	0.12	New
Commitment to Europe (CpE)^{4}	3,856	0.11	−0.21
Volt Europa (Volt)	2,868	0.08	New
Communist Party of the Workers of Catalonia (PCTC)	2,668	0.08	New
For a Fairer World (PUM+J)	2,625	0.08	New
Centrists for Europe (CCD–Lliures–UIJ–centrados)	2,074	0.06	New
Positive Left (IZQP)	1,871	0.05	New
Republican Alternative (ALTER)	1,702	0.05	+0.01
Act (PACT)	1,584	0.05	New
Extremadurans (CEx–CREx–PREx)	1,296	0.04	+0.02
Andalusia by Herself (AxSí)^{5}	1,178	0.03	−0.01
FE de las JONS–Spanish Alternative–La Falange–National Democracy (ADÑ)^{6}	1,172	0.03	−0.23
Euro Latino Independent Movement (MIEL)	1,090	0.03	New
Red Current Movement (MCR)	975	0.03	±0.00
With You, We Are Democracy (Contigo)	969	0.03	New
Humanist Party (PH)	877	0.03	−0.04
Forum of Citizens (FAC)	870	0.03	−0.03
Actual Equality (IGRE)	796	0.02	New
Internationalist Solidarity and Self-Management (SAIn)	516	0.02	±0.00
Blank ballots	20,199	0.59	−1.14
Total	3,427,549		
Valid votes	3,427,549	99.64	+0.53
Invalid votes	12,409	0.36	−0.53
Votes cast / turnout	3,439,958	60.93	+14.75
Abstentions	2,205,512	39.07	−14.75
Registered voters	5,645,470		
Sources
Footnotes: ^{1} Together for Catalonia–Free for Europe results are compared to Convergence and Union (Coalition for Europe) totals in the 2014 election.; ^{2} Citizens–Party of the Citizenry results are compared to the combined totals of Citizens–Party of the Citizenry and Union, Progress and Democracy in the 2014 election.; ^{3} Catalonia in Common–We Can results are compared to the combined totals of Initiative for Catalonia Greens–United and Alternative Left: IP and We Can in the 2014 election.; ^{4} Commitment to Europe results are compared to European Spring totals in the 2014 election.; ^{5} Andalusia by Herself results are compared to Andalusian Party totals in the 2014 election.; ^{6} FE de las JONS–Spanish Alternative–La Falange–National Democracy results are compared to the combined totals of Spanish Phalanx of the CNSO, Social Impulse, Spain on the Move and National Democracy in the 2014 election.

=== Extremadura ===
← Summary of the 26 May 2019 European Parliament election results in Extremadura →
Parties and alliances	Popular vote		
Parties and alliances	Votes	%	±pp
Spanish Socialist Workers' Party (PSOE)	278,056	46.02	+7.30
People's Party (PP)	155,444	25.73	−9.84
Citizens–Party of the Citizenry (Cs)^{1}	67,984	11.25	+4.81
United We Can Change Europe (Podemos–IU)^{2}	40,791	6.75	−4.35
Vox (Vox)	34,124	5.65	+4.68
Animalist Party Against Mistreatment of Animals (PACMA)	4,431	0.73	+0.08
Extremadurans (CEx–CREx–PREx)	3,873	0.64	+0.10
Act (PACT)	949	0.16	New
Green Coalition–Citizen Europe (CV–EC)	884	0.15	New
Zero Cuts–The Greens–European Green Group (Recortes Cero–LV–GVE)	876	0.14	+0.04
Communists (PCPE–PCPC–PCPA)	851	0.14	+0.01
Feminist Initiative (IFem)	837	0.14	+0.02
Coalition for a Solidary Europe (CEUS)^{3}	776	0.13	+0.10
Volt Europa (Volt)	774	0.13	New
For a Fairer World (PUM+J)	647	0.11	New
Centrists for Europe (CCD–Lliures–UIJ–centrados)	597	0.10	New
Communist Party of the Workers of Spain (PCTE)	530	0.09	New
With You, We Are Democracy (Contigo)	439	0.07	New
Red Current Movement (MCR)	372	0.06	+0.03
Republics Now (Ahora Repúblicas)^{4}	344	0.06	−0.03
Free for Europe (Junts)	312	0.05	New
Positive Left (IZQP)	304	0.05	New
Forum of Citizens (FAC)	303	0.05	−0.02
Pirates of Catalonia–European Pirates (pirates.cat/ep)	279	0.05	−0.09
Commitment to Europe (CpE)^{5}	267	0.04	−0.55
Actual Equality (IGRE)	255	0.04	New
FE de las JONS–Spanish Alternative–La Falange–National Democracy (ADÑ)^{6}	235	0.04	−0.22
Humanist Party (PH)	173	0.03	−0.04
Republican Alternative (ALTER)	171	0.03	−0.01
Euro Latino Independent Movement (MIEL)	141	0.02	New
Internationalist Solidarity and Self-Management (SAIn)	113	0.02	−0.01
Andalusia by Herself (AxSí)^{7}	90	0.01	−0.01
Blank ballots	7,970	1.32	−0.76
Total	604,192		
Valid votes	604,192	98.50	+1.00
Invalid votes	9,225	1.50	−1.00
Votes cast / turnout	613,417	68.08	+23.95
Abstentions	287,672	31.92	−23.95
Registered voters	901,089		
Sources
Footnotes: ^{1} Citizens–Party of the Citizenry results are compared to the combined totals of Union, Progress and Democracy and Citizens–Party of the Citizenry in the 2014 election.; ^{2} United We Can Change Europe results are compared to the combined totals of United Left–Greens–Commitment to Extremadura: Plural Left and We Can in the 2014 election.; ^{3} Coalition for a Solidary Europe results are compared to Coalition for Europe totals in the 2014 election.; ^{4} Republics Now results are compared to the combined totals of The Peoples Decide and The Left for the Right to Decide in the 2014 election.; ^{5} Commitment to Europe results are compared to European Spring totals in the 2014 election.; ^{6} FE de las JONS–Spanish Alternative–La Falange–National Democracy results are compared to the combined totals of Spanish Phalanx of the CNSO, Spain on the Move, Social Impulse and National Democracy in the 2014 election.; ^{7} Andalusia by Herself results are compared to Andalusian Party totals in the 2014 election.

=== Galicia ===
← Summary of the 26 May 2019 European Parliament election results in Galicia →
Parties and alliances	Popular vote		
Parties and alliances	Votes	%	±pp
Socialists' Party of Galicia (PSdeG–PSOE)	511,246	35.07	+13.29
People's Party (PP)	434,337	29.79	−5.40
Galician Nationalist Bloc–Republics Now (BNG–Agora Repúblicas)	172,088	11.80	+3.92
United We Can Change Europe (Podemos–EU)^{1}	118,491	8.13	−10.72
Citizens–Party of the Citizenry (Cs)^{2}	97,416	6.68	+1.59
Vox (Vox)	37,892	2.60	+1.83
Animalist Party Against Mistreatment of Animals (PACMA)	18,149	1.24	+0.15
In Tide (Commitment to Europe) (En Marea)	15,375	1.05	New
Commitment to Galicia (Coalition for a Solidary Europe) (CEUS)	6,492	0.45	−0.51
Green Coalition–Citizen Europe (CV–EC)	4,110	0.28	New
Zero Cuts–The Greens–European Green Group (Recortes Cero–LV–GVE)	4,001	0.27	+0.03
Feminist Initiative (IFem)	2,044	0.14	−0.03
Free for Europe (Junts)	1,974	0.14	New
Communists (PCPE–PCPC–PCPA)	1,973	0.14	−0.08
Volt Europa (Volt)	1,566	0.11	New
Communist Party of the Workers of Galicia (PCTG)	1,331	0.09	New
Act (PACT)	1,308	0.09	New
Pirates of Catalonia–European Pirates (pirates.cat/ep)	1,242	0.09	−0.24
For a Fairer World (PUM+J)	1,180	0.08	New
Centrists for Europe (CCD–Lliures–UIJ–centrados)	900	0.06	New
Republican Alternative (ALTER)	840	0.06	−0.03
Humanist Party (PH)	669	0.05	−0.08
Forum of Citizens (FAC)	655	0.04	−0.10
Red Current Movement (MCR)	620	0.04	±0.00
Positive Left (IZQP)	617	0.04	New
Actual Equality (IGRE)	586	0.04	New
With You, We Are Democracy (Contigo)	555	0.04	New
Euro Latino Independent Movement (MIEL)	548	0.04	New
FE de las JONS–Spanish Alternative–La Falange–National Democracy (ADÑ)^{3}	531	0.04	−0.27
Internationalist Solidarity and Self-Management (SAIn)	527	0.04	−0.02
Andalusia by Herself (AxSí)^{4}	375	0.03	+0.01
Extremadurans (CEx–CREx–PREx)	354	0.02	±0.00
Blank ballots	17,869	1.23	−1.72
Total	1,457,861		
Valid votes	1,457,861	98.87	+1.44
Invalid votes	16,666	1.13	−1.44
Votes cast / turnout	1,474,527	54.54	+15.87
Abstentions	1,229,122	45.46	−15.87
Registered voters	2,703,649		
Sources
Footnotes: ^{1} United We Can Change Europe results are compared to the combined totals of Galician Left Alternative in Europe: Plural Left and We Can in the 2014 election.; ^{2} Citizens–Party of the Citizenry results are compared to the combined totals of Union, Progress and Democracy and Citizens–Party of the Citizenry in the 2014 election.; ^{3} FE de las JONS–Spanish Alternative–La Falange–National Democracy results are compared to the combined totals of Spanish Phalanx of the CNSO, Social Impulse, National Democracy and Spain on the Move in the 2014 election.; ^{4} Andalusia by Herself results are compared to Andalusian Party totals in the 2014 election.

=== La Rioja ===
← Summary of the 26 May 2019 European Parliament election results in La Rioja →
Parties and alliances	Popular vote		
Parties and alliances	Votes	%	±pp
Spanish Socialist Workers' Party (PSOE)	60,229	37.37	+13.68
People's Party (PP)	50,124	31.10	−7.35
Citizens–Party of the Citizenry (Cs)^{1}	21,359	13.25	+1.99
United We Can Change Europe (Podemos–IU)^{2}	13,544	8.40	−7.23
Vox (Vox)	8,417	5.22	+3.83
Animalist Party Against Mistreatment of Animals (PACMA)	1,357	0.84	+0.08
Green Coalition–Citizen Europe (CV–EC)	673	0.42	New
Zero Cuts–The Greens–European Green Group (Recortes Cero–LV–GVE)	337	0.21	+0.05
Republics Now (Ahora Repúblicas)^{3}	329	0.20	−0.05
Communists (PCPE–PCPC–PCPA)	261	0.16	−0.09
Feminist Initiative (IFem)	256	0.16	+0.02
Volt Europa (Volt)	250	0.16	New
Coalition for a Solidary Europe (CEUS)^{4}	196	0.12	±0.00
Communist Party of the Workers of Spain (PCTE)	179	0.11	New
Free for Europe (Junts)	170	0.11	New
For a Fairer World (PUM+J)	167	0.10	New
Pirates of Catalonia–European Pirates (pirates.cat/ep)	139	0.09	−0.11
Commitment to Europe (CpE)^{5}	126	0.08	−1.22
Act (PACT)	116	0.07	New
Extremadurans (CEx–CREx–PREx)	106	0.07	+0.05
Red Current Movement (MCR)	95	0.06	+0.02
Positive Left (IZQP)	90	0.06	New
FE de las JONS–Spanish Alternative–La Falange–National Democracy (ADÑ)^{6}	87	0.05	−0.42
Republican Alternative (ALTER)	72	0.04	±0.00
Actual Equality (IGRE)	66	0.04	New
Centrists for Europe (CCD–Lliures–UIJ–centrados)	60	0.04	New
Euro Latino Independent Movement (MIEL)	56	0.03	New
Humanist Party (PH)	41	0.03	−0.03
Forum of Citizens (FAC)	32	0.02	−0.08
With You, We Are Democracy (Contigo)	30	0.02	New
Internationalist Solidarity and Self-Management (SAIn)	24	0.01	−0.01
Andalusia by Herself (AxSí)^{7}	23	0.01	−0.01
Blank ballots	2,173	1.35	−1.50
Total	161,184		
Valid votes	161,184	99.04	+1.72
Invalid votes	1,568	0.96	−1.72
Votes cast / turnout	162,752	64.63	+17.09
Abstentions	89,078	35.37	−17.09
Registered voters	251,830		
Sources
Footnotes: ^{1} Citizens–Party of the Citizenry results are compared to the combined totals of Union, Progress and Democracy and Citizens–Party of the Citizenry in the 2014 election.; ^{2} United We Can Change Europe results are compared to the combined totals of United Left–The Greens: Plural Left and We Can in the 2014 election.; ^{3} Republics Now results are compared to the combined totals of The Peoples Decide and The Left for the Right to Decide in the 2014 election.; ^{4} Coalition for a Solidary Europe results are compared to Coalition for Europe totals in the 2014 election.; ^{5} Commitment to Europe results are compared to European Spring totals in the 2014 election.; ^{6} FE de las JONS–Spanish Alternative–La Falange–National Democracy results are compared to the combined totals of Social Impulse, Spanish Phalanx of the CNSO, Spain on the Move and National Democracy in the 2014 election.; ^{7} Andalusia by Herself results are compared to Andalusian Party totals in the 2014 election.

=== Madrid ===
← Summary of the 26 May 2019 European Parliament election results in Madrid →
Parties and alliances	Popular vote		
Parties and alliances	Votes	%	±pp
Spanish Socialist Workers' Party (PSOE)	1,043,827	32.30	+13.35
People's Party (PP)	715,871	22.15	−7.83
Citizens–Party of the Citizenry (Cs)^{1}	589,877	18.25	+2.85
United We Can Change Europe (Podemos–IU)^{2}	413,228	12.79	−9.16
Vox (Vox)	319,443	9.89	+6.22
Animalist Party Against Mistreatment of Animals (PACMA)	50,415	1.56	+0.29
Green Coalition–Citizen Europe (CV–EC)	9,573	0.30	New
Act (PACT)	7,388	0.23	New
Volt Europa (Volt)	6,747	0.21	New
Zero Cuts–The Greens–European Green Group (Recortes Cero–LV–GVE)	6,351	0.20	+0.04
Republics Now (Ahora Repúblicas)^{3}	5,601	0.17	−0.01
For a Fairer World (PUM+J)	4,839	0.15	New
Commitment to Europe (CpE)^{4}	4,445	0.14	−1.86
Feminist Initiative (IFem)	4,203	0.13	±0.00
FE de las JONS–Spanish Alternative–La Falange–National Democracy (ADÑ)^{5}	3,047	0.09	−0.59
Communists (PCPE–PCPC–PCPA)	2,831	0.09	−0.07
Free for Europe (Junts)	2,801	0.09	New
Communist Party of the Workers of Spain (PCTE)	2,778	0.09	New
Coalition for a Solidary Europe (CEUS)^{6}	2,462	0.08	+0.01
Pirates of Catalonia–European Pirates (pirates.cat/ep)	2,259	0.07	−0.16
Extremadurans (CEx–CREx–PREx)	2,229	0.07	+0.03
Centrists for Europe (CCD–Lliures–UIJ–centrados)	1,930	0.06	New
Positive Left (IZQP)	1,726	0.05	New
Humanist Party (PH)	1,426	0.04	−0.06
Euro Latino Independent Movement (MIEL)	1,384	0.04	New
Forum of Citizens (FAC)	1,146	0.04	−0.06
Actual Equality (IGRE)	1,061	0.03	New
Republican Alternative (ALTER)	940	0.03	−0.01
Red Current Movement (MCR)	898	0.03	−0.01
With You, We Are Democracy (Contigo)	859	0.03	New
Andalusia by Herself (AxSí)^{7}	781	0.02	−0.01
Internationalist Solidarity and Self-Management (SAIn)	672	0.02	−0.02
Blank ballots	18,540	0.57	−1.38
Total	3,231,578		
Valid votes	3,231,578	98.58	+1.09
Invalid votes	13,706	0.42	−1.09
Votes cast / turnout	3,245,284	63.58	+17.13
Abstentions	1,858,937	36.42	−17.13
Registered voters	5,104,221		
Sources
Footnotes: ^{1} Citizens–Party of the Citizenry results are compared to the combined totals of Union, Progress and Democracy and Citizens–Party of the Citizenry in the 2014 election.; ^{2} United We Can Change Europe results are compared to the combined totals of We Can and United Left–The Greens: Plural Left in the 2014 election.; ^{3} Republics Now results are compared to the combined totals of The Peoples Decide and The Left for the Right to Decide in the 2014 election.; ^{4} Commitment to Europe results are compared to European Spring totals in the 2014 election.; ^{5} FE de las JONS–Spanish Alternative–La Falange–National Democracy results are compared to the combined totals of Spain on the Move, Spanish Phalanx of the CNSO, Social Impulse and National Democracy in the 2014 election.; ^{6} Coalition for a Solidary Europe results are compared to Coalition for Europe totals in the 2014 election.; ^{7} Andalusia by Herself results are compared to Andalusian Party totals in the 2014 election.

=== Murcia ===
← Summary of the 26 May 2019 European Parliament election results in Murcia →
Parties and alliances	Popular vote		
Parties and alliances	Votes	%	±pp
Spanish Socialist Workers' Party (PSOE)	206,015	31.95	+11.22
People's Party (PP)	196,899	30.53	−6.93
Citizens–Party of the Citizenry (Cs)^{1}	90,523	14.04	+0.97
Vox (Vox)	71,704	11.12	+8.78
United We Can Change Europe (Podemos–IU)^{2}	51,316	7.96	−9.42
Animalist Party Against Mistreatment of Animals (PACMA)	9,115	1.41	+0.16
Green Coalition–Citizen Europe (CV–EC)	1,731	0.27	New
Zero Cuts–The Greens–European Green Group (Recortes Cero–LV–GVE)	1,461	0.23	−0.10
Volt Europa (Volt)	1,344	0.21	New
Communists (PCPE–PCPC–PCPA)	763	0.12	−0.04
Feminist Initiative (IFem)	754	0.12	−0.03
Coalition for a Solidary Europe (CEUS)^{3}	652	0.10	+0.04
Positive Left (IZQP)	584	0.09	New
Centrists for Europe (CCD–Lliures–UIJ–centrados)	574	0.09	New
Commitment to Europe (CpE)^{4}	517	0.08	−0.81
With You, We Are Democracy (Contigo)	502	0.08	New
For a Fairer World (PUM+J)	493	0.08	New
Republics Now (Ahora Repúblicas)^{5}	487	0.08	−0.05
Communist Party of the Workers of Spain (PCTE)	461	0.07	New
Pirates of Catalonia–European Pirates (pirates.cat/ep)	410	0.06	−0.08
Free for Europe (Junts)	389	0.06	New
Actual Equality (IGRE)	384	0.06	New
Act (PACT)	368	0.06	New
FE de las JONS–Spanish Alternative–La Falange–National Democracy (ADÑ)^{6}	362	0.06	−0.52
Forum of Citizens (FAC)	316	0.05	−0.08
Extremadurans (CEx–CREx–PREx)	245	0.04	+0.03
Humanist Party (PH)	232	0.04	−0.04
Red Current Movement (MCR)	201	0.03	±0.00
Euro Latino Independent Movement (MIEL)	200	0.03	New
Internationalist Solidarity and Self-Management (SAIn)	191	0.03	±0.00
Republican Alternative (ALTER)	149	0.02	−0.03
Andalusia by Herself (AxSí)^{7}	148	0.02	−0.01
Blank ballots	5,343	0.83	−1.40
Total	644,833		
Valid votes	644,833	99.15	+1.29
Invalid votes	5,528	0.85	−1.29
Votes cast / turnout	650,361	60.78	+18.28
Abstentions	419,668	39.22	−18.28
Registered voters	1,070,029		
Sources
Footnotes: ^{1} Citizens–Party of the Citizenry results are compared to the combined totals of Union, Progress and Democracy and Citizens–Party of the Citizenry in the 2014 election.; ^{2} United We Can Change Europe results are compared to the combined totals of United Left–Greens of the Region of Murcia: Plural Left and We Can in the 2014 election.; ^{3} Coalition for a Solidary Europe results are compared to Coalition for Europe totals in the 2014 election.; ^{4} Commitment to Europe results are compared to European Spring totals in the 2014 election.; ^{5} Republics Now results are compared to the combined totals of The Peoples Decide and The Left for the Right to Decide in the 2014 election.; ^{6} FE de las JONS–Spanish Alternative–La Falange–National Democracy results are compared to the combined totals of Social Impulse, Spanish Phalanx of the CNSO, Spain on the Move and National Democracy in the 2014 election.; ^{7} Andalusia by Herself results are compared to Andalusian Party totals in the 2014 election.

=== Navarre ===
← Summary of the 26 May 2019 European Parliament election results in Navarre →
Parties and alliances	Popular vote		
Parties and alliances	Votes	%	±pp
Spanish Socialist Workers' Party (PSOE)	95,164	27.96	+13.48
People's Party (PP)	63,800	18.75	−6.37
Basque Country Gather–Republics Now (EH Bildu–Orain Errepublikak)	54,406	15.99	−4.22
United We Can Change Europe (Podemos–IU)^{1}	39,780	11.69	−7.10
Yes to the Future (Coalition for a Solidary Europe) (GBai)^{2}	27,202	7.99	+5.45
Citizens–Party of the Citizenry (Cs)^{3}	25,233	7.41	+1.06
Vox (Vox)	14,349	4.22	+2.63
Animalist Party Against Mistreatment of Animals (PACMA)	3,524	1.04	+0.15
Green Coalition–Citizen Europe (CV–EC)	1,955	0.57	New
Free for Europe (Junts)	1,336	0.39	New
Zero Cuts–The Greens–European Green Group (Recortes Cero–LV–GVE)	1,088	0.32	+0.01
Feminist Initiative (IFem)	911	0.27	+0.06
For a Fairer World (PUM+J)	605	0.18	New
Communists (PCPE–PCPC–PCPA)	465	0.14	−0.06
Positive Left (IZQP)	461	0.14	New
Internationalist Solidarity and Self-Management (SAIn)	458	0.13	−0.18
Volt Europa (Volt)	407	0.12	New
Communist Party of the Workers of Spain (PCTE)	370	0.11	New
Centrists for Europe (CCD–Lliures–UIJ–centrados)	367	0.11	New
Commitment to Europe (CpE)^{4}	344	0.10	−1.50
With You, We Are Democracy (Contigo)	332	0.10	New
Pirates of Catalonia–European Pirates (pirates.cat/ep)	312	0.09	−0.27
Republican Alternative (ALTER)	248	0.07	±0.00
Act (PACT)	235	0.07	New
Forum of Citizens (FAC)	227	0.07	−0.04
Humanist Party (PH)	185	0.05	−0.06
Actual Equality (IGRE)	160	0.05	New
FE de las JONS–Spanish Alternative–La Falange–National Democracy (ADÑ)^{5}	121	0.04	−0.49
Andalusia by Herself (AxSí)^{6}	112	0.03	+0.01
Euro Latino Independent Movement (MIEL)	106	0.03	New
Extremadurans (CEx–CREx–PREx)	100	0.03	+0.01
Red Current Movement (MCR)	63	0.02	±0.00
Blank ballots	5,903	1.73	−0.97
Total	340,329		
Valid votes	340,329	99.26	+0.88
Invalid votes	2,539	0.74	−0.88
Votes cast / turnout	342,868	66.85	+22.30
Abstentions	170,010	33.15	−22.30
Registered voters	512,878		
Sources
Footnotes: ^{1} United We Can Change Europe results are compared to the combined totals of Left: Plural Left and We Can in the 2014 election.; ^{2} Yes to the Future (Coalition for a Solidary Europe) results are compared to Basque Nationalist Party (Coalition for Europe) totals in the 2014 election.; ^{3} Citizens–Party of the Citizenry results are compared to the combined totals of Union, Progress and Democracy and Citizens–Party of the Citizenry in the 2014 election.; ^{4} Commitment to Europe results are compared to European Spring totals in the 2014 election.; ^{5} FE de las JONS–Spanish Alternative–La Falange–National Democracy results are compared to the combined totals of Social Impulse, Spanish Phalanx of the CNSO, National Democracy and Spain on the Move in the 2014 election.; ^{6} Andalusia by Herself results are compared to Andalusian Party totals in the 2014 election.

=== Valencian Community ===
← Summary of the 26 May 2019 European Parliament election results in the Valencian Community →
Parties and alliances	Popular vote		
Parties and alliances	Votes	%	±pp
Spanish Socialist Workers' Party (PSOE)	763,120	32.97	+11.41
People's Party (PP)	522,602	22.58	−6.43
Citizens–Party of the Citizenry (Cs)^{1}	329,926	14.26	+2.83
United We Can Change Europe (Podemos–EUPV)^{2}	224,207	9.69	−9.09
Commitment Coalition (Commitment to Europe) (Compromís)	193,506	8.36	+0.41
Vox (Vox)	167,340	7.23	+5.52
Animalist Party Against Mistreatment of Animals (PACMA)	34,261	1.48	+0.18
Republics Now–Republican Left (Ara Repúbliques–ERPV)^{3}	12,388	0.54	−0.04
Green Coalition–Citizen Europe (CV–EC)	7,407	0.32	New
Free for Europe (Junts)	6,903	0.30	New
Zero Cuts–The Greens–European Green Group (Recortes Cero–LV–GVE)	5,737	0.25	−0.01
With You, We Are Democracy (Contigo)	3,468	0.15	New
Volt Europa (Volt)	3,246	0.14	New
Feminist Initiative (IFem)	2,632	0.11	−0.06
Communists (PCPE–PCPC–PCPA)	2,568	0.11	−0.16
Valencian Democrats (Coalition for a Solidary Europe) (DV)	2,015	0.09	New
Act (PACT)	1,980	0.09	New
For a Fairer World (PUM+J)	1,422	0.06	New
Centrists for Europe (CCD–Lliures–UIJ–centrados)	1,252	0.05	New
Pirates of Catalonia–European Pirates (pirates.cat/ep)	1,246	0.05	−0.21
Communist Party of the Workers of Spain (PCTE)	1,229	0.05	New
FE de las JONS–Spanish Alternative–La Falange–National Democracy (ADÑ)^{4}	1,034	0.04	−0.59
Actual Equality (IGRE)	1,007	0.04	New
Positive Left (IZQP)	979	0.04	New
Red Current Movement (MCR)	757	0.03	+0.01
Euro Latino Independent Movement (MIEL)	716	0.03	New
Extremadurans (CEx–CREx–PREx)	692	0.03	+0.01
Forum of Citizens (FAC)	686	0.03	−0.09
Republican Alternative (ALTER)	600	0.03	−0.04
Humanist Party (PH)	595	0.03	−0.09
Andalusia by Herself (AxSí)^{5}	441	0.02	−0.02
Internationalist Solidarity and Self-Management (SAIn)	329	0.01	−0.02
Blank ballots	18,159	0.78	−1.30
Total	2,314,450		
Valid votes	2,314,450	99.24	+1.38
Invalid votes	17,742	0.76	−1.38
Votes cast / turnout	2,332,192	62.50	+13.44
Abstentions	1,399,593	37.50	−13.44
Registered voters	3,731,785		
Sources
Footnotes: ^{1} Citizens–Party of the Citizenry results are compared to the combined totals of Union, Progress and Democracy and Citizens–Party of the Citizenry in the 2014 election.; ^{2} United We Can Change Europe results are compared to the combined totals of United Left of the Valencian Country–The Greens: Plural Left and We Can in the 2014 election.; ^{3} Republics Now–Republican Left results are compared to the combined totals of The Left for the Right to Decide and The Peoples Decide in the 2014 election.; ^{4} FE de las JONS–Spanish Alternative–La Falange–National Democracy results are compared to the combined totals of Spanish Phalanx of the CNSO, Spain on the Move, Social Impulse and National Democracy in the 2014 election.; ^{5} Andalusia by Herself results are compared to Andalusian Party totals in the 2014 election.

== Autonomous cities ==
=== Ceuta ===
← Summary of the 26 May 2019 European Parliament election results in Ceuta →
Parties and alliances	Popular vote		
Parties and alliances	Votes	%	±pp
Spanish Socialist Workers' Party (PSOE)	11,008	33.58	+11.03
People's Party (PP)	8,930	27.24	−13.09
Vox (Vox)	6,748	20.58	+18.83
Citizens–Party of the Citizenry (Cs)^{1}	2,527	7.71	−1.51
Caballas Coalition (Commitment to Europe) (Caballas)	1,260	3.84	−5.11
United We Can Change Europe (Podemos–IU)^{2}	1,108	3.38	−3.70
Animalist Party Against Mistreatment of Animals (PACMA)	313	0.95	−0.49
Green Coalition–Citizen Europe (CV–EC)	141	0.43	New
Coalition for a Solidary Europe (CEUS)^{3}	98	0.30	+0.20
Volt Europa (Volt)	54	0.16	New
Zero Cuts–The Greens–European Green Group (Recortes Cero–LV–GVE)	50	0.15	−0.23
For a Fairer World (PUM+J)	41	0.13	New
Communists (PCPE–PCPC–PCPA)	30	0.09	−0.09
Republics Now (Ahora Repúblicas)^{4}	26	0.08	−0.11
Act (PACT)	19	0.06	New
Centrists for Europe (CCD–Lliures–UIJ–centrados)	18	0.05	New
Feminist Initiative (IFem)	16	0.05	−0.03
Free for Europe (Junts)	16	0.05	New
Communist Party of the Workers of Spain (PCTE)	14	0.04	New
Andalusia by Herself (AxSí)^{5}	13	0.04	−0.18
Positive Left (IZQP)	13	0.04	New
Pirates of Catalonia–European Pirates (pirates.cat/ep)	12	0.04	−0.12
Red Current Movement (MCR)	11	0.03	−0.02
Humanist Party (PH)	10	0.03	−0.11
Forum of Citizens (FAC)	10	0.03	−0.04
Actual Equality (IGRE)	10	0.03	New
Republican Alternative (ALTER)	9	0.03	−0.01
Euro Latino Independent Movement (MIEL)	8	0.02	New
With You, We Are Democracy (Contigo)	7	0.02	New
FE de las JONS–Spanish Alternative–La Falange–National Democracy (ADÑ)^{6}	7	0.02	−0.82
Extremadurans (CEx–CREx–PREx)	6	0.02	±0.00
Internationalist Solidarity and Self-Management (SAIn)	2	0.01	−0.02
Blank ballots	251	0.77	−2.87
Total	32,786		
Valid votes	32,786	99.04	+0.89
Invalid votes	317	0.96	−0.89
Votes cast / turnout	33,103	52.97	+27.04
Abstentions	29,392	47.03	−27.04
Registered voters	62,495		
Sources
Footnotes: ^{1} Citizens–Party of the Citizenry results are compared to the combined totals of Union, Progress and Democracy and Citizens–Party of the Citizenry in the 2014 election.; ^{2} United We Can Change Europe results are compared to the combined totals of We Can and United Left–The Greens: Plural Left in the 2014 election.; ^{3} Coalition for a Solidary Europe results are compared to Coalition for Europe totals in the 2014 election.; ^{4} Republics Now results are compared to the combined totals of The Peoples Decide and The Left for the Right to Decide in the 2014 election.; ^{5} Andalusia by Herself results are compared to Andalusian Party totals in the 2014 election.; ^{6} FE de las JONS–Spanish Alternative–La Falange–National Democracy results are compared to the combined totals of Spanish Phalanx of the CNSO, Spain on the Move, Social Impulse and National Democracy in the 2014 election.

=== Melilla ===
← Summary of the 26 May 2019 European Parliament election results in Melilla →
Parties and alliances	Popular vote		
Parties and alliances	Votes	%	±pp
People's Party (PP)	9,830	30.62	−13.34
Spanish Socialist Workers' Party (PSOE)	7,487	23.32	−1.67
Coalition for Melilla (Commitment to Europe) (CpM)	5,927	18.46	New
Vox (Vox)	3,372	10.50	+4.60
Citizens–Party of the Citizenry (Cs)^{1}	2,687	8.37	−0.44
United We Can Change Europe (Podemos–IU)^{2}	954	2.98	−3.27
Animalist Party Against Mistreatment of Animals (PACMA)	331	1.03	−0.10
Zero Cuts–The Greens–European Green Group (Recortes Cero–LV–GVE)	330	1.03	+0.93
Green Coalition–Citizen Europe (CV–EC)	281	0.88	New
Extremadurans (CEx–CREx–PREx)	204	0.64	+0.61
Centrists for Europe (CCD–Lliures–UIJ–centrados)	96	0.30	New
Actual Equality (IGRE)	66	0.21	New
Feminist Initiative (IFem)	34	0.11	+0.02
Free for Europe (Junts)	30	0.09	New
Communists (PCPE–PCPC–PCPA)	27	0.08	−0.07
Volt Europa (Volt)	26	0.08	New
For a Fairer World (PUM+J)	23	0.07	New
Positive Left (IZQP)	19	0.06	New
FE de las JONS–Spanish Alternative–La Falange–National Democracy (ADÑ)^{3}	17	0.05	−0.67
Pirates of Catalonia–European Pirates (pirates.cat/ep)	15	0.05	−0.05
Communist Party of the Workers of Spain (PCTE)	14	0.04	New
Coalition for a Solidary Europe (CEUS)^{4}	13	0.04	−0.04
Internationalist Solidarity and Self-Management (SAIn)	13	0.04	±0.00
Euro Latino Independent Movement (MIEL)	13	0.04	New
Republics Now (Ahora Repúblicas)^{5}	12	0.04	−0.05
Act (PACT)	12	0.04	New
Forum of Citizens (FAC)	11	0.03	−0.13
Humanist Party (PH)	10	0.03	−0.14
With You, We Are Democracy (Contigo)	9	0.03	New
Red Current Movement (MCR)	8	0.02	+0.01
Andalusia by Herself (AxSí)^{6}	8	0.02	−0.06
Republican Alternative (ALTER)	4	0.01	−0.02
Blank ballots	216	0.67	−2.70
Total	32,102		
Valid votes	32,102	98.89	+0.82
Invalid votes	359	1.11	−0.82
Votes cast / turnout	32,461	54.81	+28.76
Abstentions	26,768	45.19	−28.76
Registered voters	59,229		
Sources
Footnotes: ^{1} Citizens–Party of the Citizenry results are compared to the combined totals of Union, Progress and Democracy and Citizens–Party of the Citizenry in the 2014 election.; ^{2} United We Can Change Europe results are compared to the combined totals of United Left–The Greens: Plural Left and We Can in the 2014 election.; ^{3} FE de las JONS–Spanish Alternative–La Falange–National Democracy results are compared to the combined totals of Spanish Phalanx of the CNSO, Spain on the Move, National Democracy and Social Impulse in the 2014 election.; ^{4} Coalition for a Solidary Europe results are compared to Coalition for Europe totals in the 2014 election.; ^{5} Republics Now results are compared to the combined totals of The Peoples Decide and The Left for the Right to Decide in the 2014 election.; ^{6} Andalusia by Herself results are compared to Andalusian Party totals in the 2014 election.

== Congress of Deputies projection ==
A projection of European Parliament election results using electoral rules for the Congress of Deputies would have given the following seat allocation, as distributed per constituencies and regions: (Note: Note that results are compared with party totals in the preceding general election—held in April 2019—for consistency.)

Summary of the 26 May 2019 Congress of Deputies projected election results
Parties and alliances	Popular vote			Seats	
Parties and alliances	Votes	%	±pp	Total	+/−
Spanish Socialist Workers' Party (PSOE)	7,369,789	32.86	+4.18	152	+29
People's Party (PP)	4,519,205	20.15	+3.45	82	+16
Citizens–Party of the Citizenry (Cs)	2,731,825	12.18	−3.68	32	−25
United We Can Change Europe (Podemos–IU)	2,258,857	10.07	−4.24	25	−17
Vox (Vox)	1,393,684	6.21	−4.05	10	−14
Together for Catalonia (JxCat–Junts)	981,357	4.38	+2.47	17	+10
Republican Left of Catalonia (ERC)	759,891	3.39	−0.52	11	−4
Basque Nationalist Party (EAJ/PNV)	380,577	1.70	+0.19	9	+3
Basque Country Gather (EH Bildu)	301,343	1.34	+0.35	5	+1
Commitment Coalition (Compromís)	193,506	0.86	+0.20	2	+1
Canarian Coalition–Canarian Nationalist Party (CCa–PNC)	186,372	0.83	+0.30	3	+1
Galician Nationalist Bloc (BNG)	172,088	0.77	+0.41	2	+2
Sum Navarre (NA+)	n/a	n/a	−0.41	0	−2
Regionalist Party of Cantabria (PRC)	n/a	n/a	−0.20	0	−1
Others	960,836	4.28	—	0	±0
Blank ballots	216,736	0.97	+0.21		
Total	22,426,066			350	±0

=== Constituencies ===

Summary of constituency results in the 26 May 2019 European Parliament election in Spain
Constituency	PSOE		PP		Cs		UP		Vox		Junts		ERC		PNV		EH Bildu		Compromís		CCa–PNC		BNG	
Constituency	%	S	%	S	%	S	%	S	%	S	%	S	%	S	%	S	%	S	%	S	%	S	%	S
A Coruña	34.2	4	28.8	3	7.0	−	8.2	−	2.8	−													13.0	1
Álava	22.1	1	12.5	−	3.7	−	11.8	−	2.1	−					25.3	2	17.9	1						
Albacete	39.4	2	27.0	1	13.7	1	8.2	−	7.4	−														
Alicante	33.7	5	24.6	3	15.2	2	9.3	1	7.2	1			0.4	−					4.8	−				
Almería	35.5	3	30.7	2	12.2	1	6.7	−	11.2	−														
Asturias	38.6	4	19.0	1	13.6	1	14.7	1	7.4	−														
Ávila	29.1	1	36.5	2	15.8	−	6.4	−	7.9	−														
Badajoz	47.4	4	24.6	2	11.6	−	6.6	−	5.6	−														
Balearic Islands	29.3	3	21.2	2	11.8	1	10.5	1	7.7	1			4.9	−										
Barcelona	24.0	8	5.4	2	9.1	3	9.6	3	2.0	−	25.6	9	20.3	7										
Biscay	18.6	2	6.1	−	2.7	−	11.4	1	1.2	−					38.3	4	18.3	1						
Burgos	34.7	2	27.2	1	16.2	1	9.3	−	6.9	−														
Cáceres	43.9	3	27.6	1	10.7	−	6.9	−	5.8	−														
Cádiz	37.8	5	19.1	2	14.5	1	14.1	1	7.4	−														
Cantabria	37.5	2	27.1	2	14.0	1	8.6	−	6.8	−														
Castellón	34.3	2	24.4	2	12.7	1	8.9	−	7.2	−			1.0	−					7.1	−				
Ceuta	33.6	1	27.2	−	7.7	−	3.4	−	20.6	−														
Ciudad Real	42.5	3	28.3	2	11.8	−	6.8	−	6.9	−														
Córdoba	39.8	3	23.8	1	12.7	1	12.9	1	6.5	−														
Cuenca	42.2	2	31.6	1	9.2	−	6.6	−	6.8	−														
Gipuzkoa	18.2	1	4.3	−	2.3	−	10.2	−	0.9	−					30.7	3	29.8	2						
Girona	14.8	1	3.2	−	6.1	−	4.5	−	1.6	−	44.9	4	21.5	1										
Granada	39.9	3	22.9	2	13.3	1	10.8	1	8.2	−														
Guadalajara	36.2	2	23.9	1	14.7	−	9.8	−	10.9	−														
Huelva	45.9	4	22.0	1	11.4	−	9.2	−	6.3	−														
Huesca	38.3	2	22.8	1	15.1	−	9.8	−	6.8	−														
Jaén	46.0	3	23.7	1	11.8	1	8.5	−	6.3	−														
La Rioja	37.4	2	31.1	2	13.3	−	8.4	−	5.2	−														
Las Palmas	32.5	4	15.8	1	8.4	1	10.7	1	3.6	−											15.2	1		
León	39.3	2	27.3	2	13.3	−	8.9	−	6.5	−														
Lleida	14.3	1	4.8	−	5.6	−	3.9	−	1.5	−	40.3	2	26.4	1										
Lugo	34.8	2	35.3	2	5.2	−	5.9	−	2.7	−													10.3	−
Madrid	32.3	13	22.2	8	18.3	7	12.8	5	9.9	4														
Málaga	36.6	5	25.2	3	13.8	1	11.4	1	7.9	1														
Melilla	23.3	−	30.6	1	8.4	−	3.0	−	10.5	−														
Murcia	31.9	4	30.5	3	14.0	1	8.0	1	11.1	1														
Navarre	28.0	2	18.7	1	7.4	−	11.7	1	4.2	−							16.0	1						
Ourense	34.5	2	35.8	2	7.1	−	5.3	−	2.6	−													9.1	−
Palencia	35.5	2	33.4	1	13.1	−	7.4	−	6.7	−														
Pontevedra	36.5	3	26.8	2	6.7	−	9.9	1	2.4	−													12.0	1
Salamanca	32.6	2	34.8	2	15.6	−	6.5	−	6.6	−														
Santa Cruz de Tenerife	31.5	3	15.9	1	6.8	−	10.1	1	3.0	−											26.4	2		
Segovia	32.8	2	31.0	1	15.7	−	8.4	−	7.1	−														
Seville	43.8	6	17.7	2	12.7	1	13.5	2	7.2	1														
Soria	38.7	1	29.0	1	13.2	−	7.4	−	6.5	−														
Tarragona	19.9	2	5.4	−	9.6	−	6.1	−	2.6	−	27.8	2	24.6	2										
Teruel	37.1	2	26.3	1	15.0	−	8.2	−	6.9	−														
Toledo	40.5	3	27.4	2	11.7	1	7.3	−	9.1	−														
Valencia	32.2	6	21.0	3	14.0	2	10.1	1	7.3	1			0.5	−					10.8	2				
Valladolid	34.5	2	27.8	2	16.5	1	8.8	−	8.5	−														
Zamora	36.4	2	31.9	1	13.5	−	6.9	−	6.5	−														
Zaragoza	35.6	3	20.8	2	18.2	1	10.8	1	8.3	−														
Total	32.9	152	20.2	82	12.2	32	10.1	25	6.2	10	4.4	17	3.4	11	1.7	9	1.3	5	0.9	2	0.8	3	0.8	2

=== Regions ===

Summary of regional results in the 26 May 2019 European Parliament election in Spain
Region	PSOE		PP		Cs		UP		Vox		Junts		ERC		PNV		EH Bildu		Compromís		CCa–PNC		BNG	
Region	%	S	%	S	%	S	%	S	%	S	%	S	%	S	%	S	%	S	%	S	%	S	%	S
Andalusia	40.5	32	22.3	14	13.0	7	11.6	6	7.6	2														
Aragon	36.2	7	21.7	4	17.3	1	10.4	1	7.9	−														
Asturias	38.6	4	19.0	1	13.6	1	14.7	1	7.4	−														
Balearic Islands	29.3	3	21.2	2	11.8	1	10.5	1	7.7	1			4.9	−										
Basque Country	19.0	4	6.4	−	2.7	−	11.1	1	1.2	−					33.9	9	22.0	4						
Canary Islands	32.0	7	15.8	2	7.6	1	10.4	2	3.3	−											20.8	3		
Cantabria	37.5	2	27.1	2	14.0	1	8.6	−	6.8	−														
Castile and León	35.0	16	30.1	13	15.1	2	8.1	−	7.2	−														
Castilla–La Mancha	40.5	12	27.6	7	12.2	2	7.6	−	8.2	−														
Catalonia	22.1	12	5.2	2	8.6	3	8.4	3	2.0	−	28.5	17	21.2	11										
Ceuta	33.6	1	27.2	−	7.7	−	3.4	−	20.6	−														
Extremadura	46.0	7	25.7	3	11.3	−	6.8	−	5.6	−														
Galicia	35.1	11	29.8	9	6.7	−	8.1	1	2.6	−													11.8	2
La Rioja	37.4	2	31.1	2	13.3	−	8.4	−	5.2	−														
Madrid	32.3	13	22.2	8	18.3	7	12.8	5	9.9	4														
Melilla	23.3	−	30.6	1	8.4	−	3.0	−	10.5	−														
Murcia	31.9	4	30.5	3	14.0	1	8.0	1	11.1	1														
Navarre	28.0	2	18.7	1	7.4	−	11.7	1	4.2	−							16.0	1						
Valencian Community	33.0	13	22.6	8	14.3	5	9.7	2	7.2	2			0.5	−					8.4	2				
Total	32.9	152	20.2	82	12.2	32	10.1	25	6.2	10	4.4	17	3.4	11	1.7	9	1.3	5	0.9	2	0.8	3	0.8	2
