= Villán de Tordesillas =

Coordinates: 41°36′N 4°55′W

Villán de Tordesillas, Spain
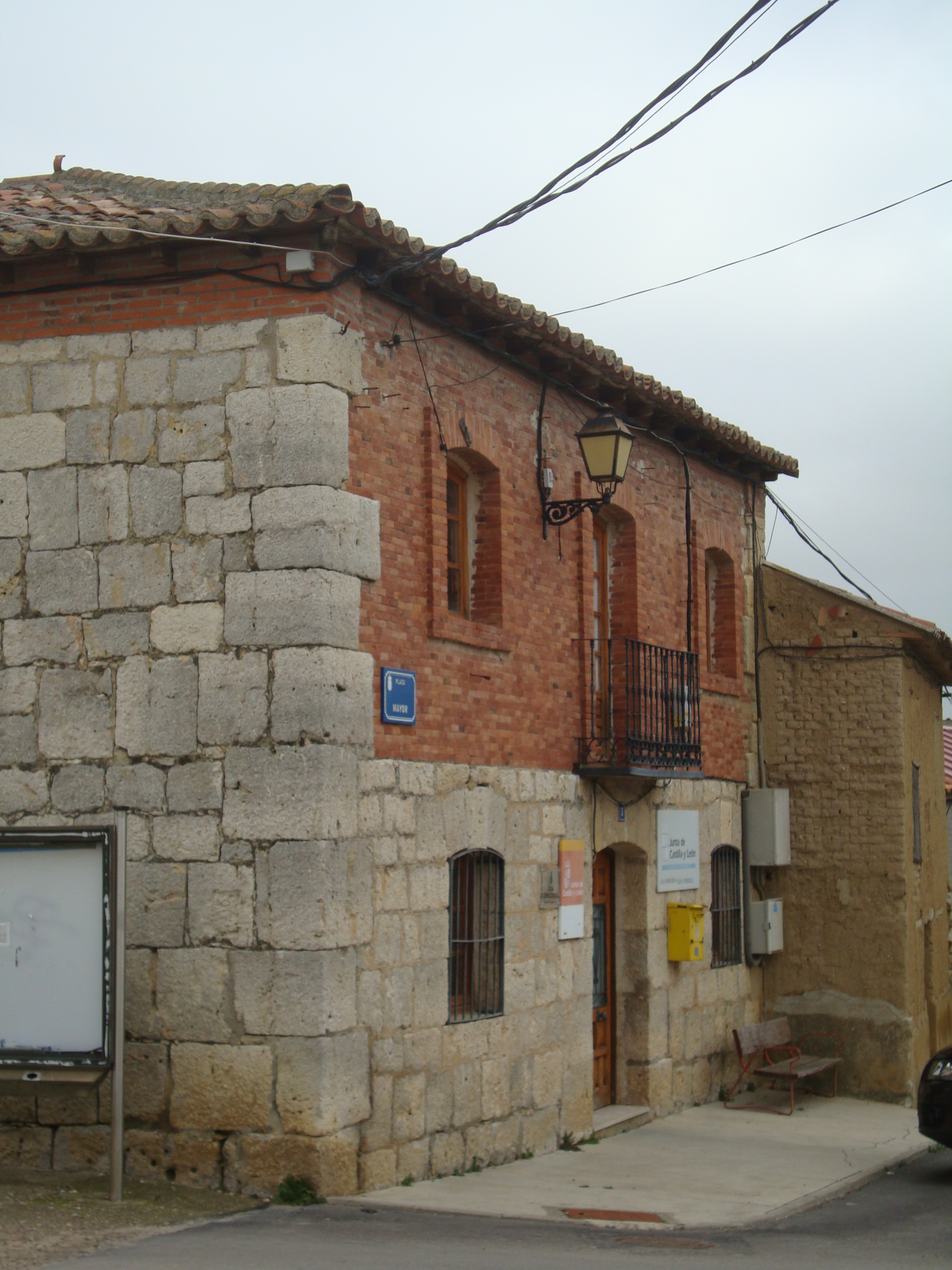
- Town hall and old schools of Villán de Tordesillas (Valladolid).
- Interactive map of Villán de Tordesillas, Spain
- Country: Spain
- Autonomous community: Castile and León
- Province: Valladolid
- Municipality: Villán de Tordesillas

Area
  - Total: 12.30 km^{2} (4.75 sq mi)
- Elevation: 748 m (2,454 ft)

Population (2025-01-01)
  - Total: 122
  - Density: 9.92/km^{2} (25.7/sq mi)
- Time zone: UTC+1 (CET)
  - Summer (DST): UTC+2 (CEST)

Villán de Tordesillas is a municipality located in the province of Valladolid, Castile and León, Spain. According to the 2004 census (INE), the municipality had a population of 176 inhabitants.

The town has a falangist councillor, formerly had a mayor affiliated with the Falange Española, and saw itself involved in an incident in 2018 involving the display of a Franco-era flag in the town hall's flagpost.
