= European Spring =

European Spring may refer to:

- The European Revolutions of 1848
- The European Revolutions of 1989
- The 2026 European Unrest, often compared to the Arab Spring
- European Spring, Spanish electoral alliance for the European Parliament election in 2014
- European Spring, political party and electoral alliance linked to DieM25 for the European Parliament election in 2019
