= National Democracy (Spain) =

National Democracy Democracia Nacional
- Leader: Luis Mateos
- Founded: 1995
- Headquarters: Peña Francia Street, 13, Valladolid
- Youth wing: Democracia Nacional Joven
- Ideology: Neo-Nazism; Spanish nationalism Right-wing populism Hard Euroscepticism; Anti-globalism; Nouvelle Droite
- Political position: Far-right
- National affiliation: ADÑ–Spanish Identity (2018–2024)
- European affiliation: Alliance for Peace and Freedom
- International affiliation: World National-Conservative Movement (2015); International Sovereigntist League (since 2025)

Party flag

Website
- democracianacional.es

National Democracy (Spanish: Democracia Nacional, DN) is a far-right political party in Spain, founded in 1995. It is modelled on the National Rally (RN) of France, and grew indirectly out of several defunct parties like the Spanish Circle of Friends of Europe (CEDADE) group and Juntas Españolas. Until 2018, its leader was Manuel Canduela Serrano, a former member of Acción Radical, a group active in the Valencian Community. He was also a vocalist in the so-called "identity" rock group Division 250. The party's current leader is Pedro Chaparro.

In the 2004 general election, the party got 15,180 votes throughout Spain, amounting to 0.06% of the total vote. In the 2008 general election, it got 12,588 votes, amounting to 0.05% of the vote. That dropped to 0.01% of the vote in the 2011 general election, with 1,876 votes.

In 2007 the party gained three town councillors: two in Tardajos and one in Herradón de Pinares. In Tardajos it governed with the People's Party. In the 2011 local elections, one town councillor was elected under the DN banner in Tardajos. In the 2015 local elections, the DN lost the seat in Tardajos but gained a new town councillor in Cuenca de Campos, which it lost in 2019.

== History ==
National Democracy rally, 2014.

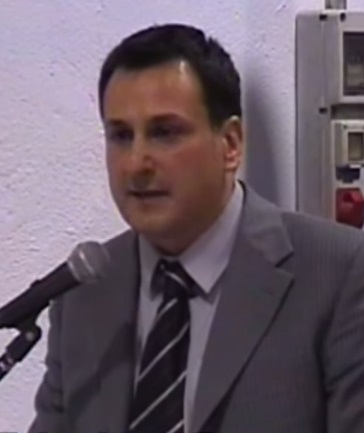
Manuel Canduela, who led of the party, in 2011

The party was formed in January 1995 by members of the far-right groups CEDADE and the Juntas Españolas. CEDADE had been a neo-Nazi group led by the prominent fascist figure and Nazi collaborator Léon Degrelle. The Juntas Españolas had been a far-right party, which attempted to copy the image and strategy of the French National Front.

The party's first president was Juan Enrique Peligro Robledo. Later, Manuel Canduela, a founding member of the neo-Nazi musical group Division 250, became président in 2004. He had previously directed the party's youth wing, the Democracia Nacional Joven.

In July 2013, the ND joined forces with La Falange, Alianza Nacional, Nudo Patriota Español and the Spanish Catholic Movement in the La España en Marcha initiative; that year, on Catalonia's national day, members of those parties staged altercations at the Blanquerna Cultural Center of Catalonia to protest Catalan independence.

The party was a founding member of the far-right European political party, the Alliance for Peace and Freedom, which was founded in 2015 with other members including Forza Nuova and the National Democratic Party of Germany.

In 2019, National Democracy formed an electoral coalition, ADÑ Identidad Española, with FE-JONS, Spanish Alternative and La Falange to contend in the 2019 European Parliament election in Spain.

== Ideology ==
The party has been described by Spanish political observers as far-right, adopting many of the features of the Nouvelle Droite movement. The party espouses anti-immigrant rhetoric and xenophobia directed towards non-Spanish citizens. In territorial politics, it defends the unity of Spain, is staunchly nationalist and opposes Catalan independence. The party is eurosceptic and supports the dissolution of the European Union.

== Elections results ==
=== Cortes Generales ===
Election	Leader	Congress of Deputies					Senate		Rank	Government
Election	Leader	Votes	%	±pp	Seats won	+/−	Seats won	+/−	Rank	Government
2000	Manuel Canduela Serrano	9,562	0.04%	▲	0 / 470	±0	—N/a	—N/a	#33	No seats
2004	Manuel Canduela Serrano	15,180	0.06%	▲	0 / 470	±0	—N/a	—N/a	#27	No seats
2008	Manuel Canduela Serrano	12,836	0.05%	▼0.01	0 / 472	▲0	—N/a	—N/a	#29	No seats
2011	Manuel Canduela Serrano	1,867	0.01%	▼0.4	0 / 473	▲0	—N/a	—N/a	#38	No seats
2015	Manuel Canduela Serrano	1,704	0.01%	—	0 / 350	▲0	0 / 207	▲0	#35	No seats

=== European Parliament ===
Election year	# of total votes	% of overall vote	Rank	# of seats won
1999	8,053 ▲	0.04% ▲	31 ▲	0 / 12
2004	6,314 ▼	0.04% ▲	17 ▲	0 / 12
2009	9,950 ▲	0.06% ▲	20 ▲	0 / 12
2014	13,079 ▲	0.08% ▲	27 ▲	0 / 12
2019	Within ADÑ – Spanish Identity.			0 / 54

== See also ==
- España 2000
