= José Luis Cordeiro =

Venezuelan engineer, economist, futurist, and transhumanist

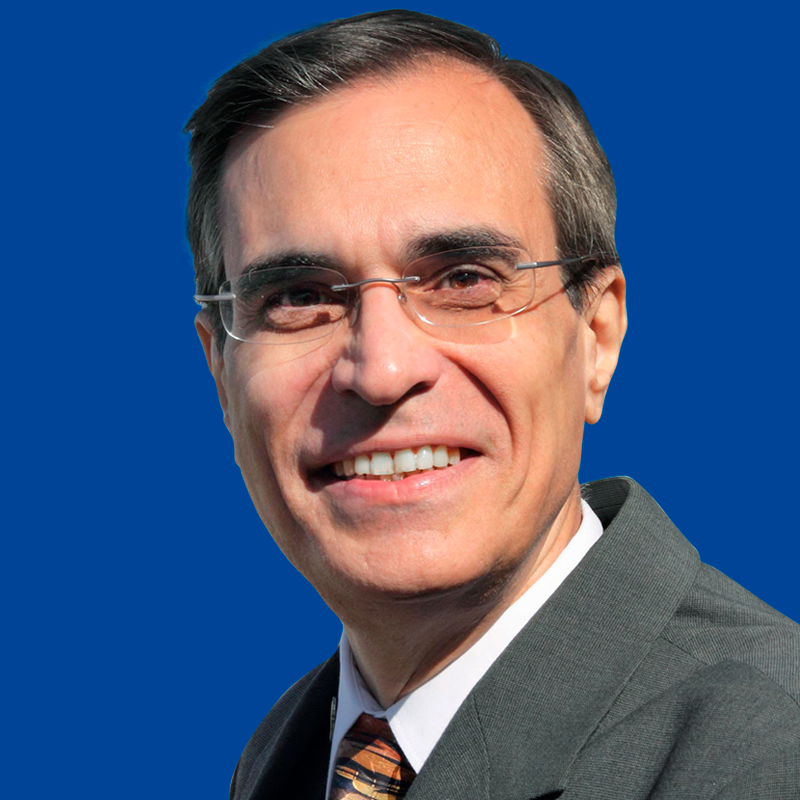
- Born: 1 April 1962 (age 63); Caracas, Venezuela
- Education: Massachusetts Institute of Technology; INSEAD; Universidad Simón Bolívar
- Occupations: Futurist, author
- Known for: Dollarization, transhumanism, life extension, singularitarianism
- Website: josecordeiro.es

José Luis Cordeiro Mateo (born 1 April 1962) is a Venezuelan-Spanish engineer, economist, futurist, and transhumanist, who has worked on areas including economic development, international relations, Latin America, the European Union, monetary policy, comparison of constitutions, energy trends, cryonics, and life extension. Books he has written include The Great Taboo, Constitutions Around the World: A Comparative View from Latin America, and (in Spanish) El Desafio Latinoamericano ("The Latin American challenge"), and La Muerte de la Muerte ("The death of death").

== Biography ==
Cordeiro was born in Caracas, Venezuela, from Spanish parents who emigrated from Madrid during the Franco dictatorship.

Cordeiro obtained Bachelor of Science (BSc) and Master of Science (MSc) degrees in mechanical engineering at the Massachusetts Institute of Technology (MIT), Cambridge, USA. He later studied international economics and comparative politics at Georgetown University in Washington, DC, USA, and obtained a Master of Business Administration (MBA) at the Institut Européen d’Administration des Affaires (INSEAD) in Fontainebleau, France, majoring in finance and globalization. He started his doctoral degree at MIT, continued these studies in Tokyo, Japan, and in due course received his PhD at Universidad Simón Bolívar (USB) in Caracas, Venezuela.

After graduating, Cordeiro worked as a petroleum exploration engineer for Schlumberger. He next served as an adviser for many major oil companies, including BP, ChevronTexaco, ExxonMobil, PDVSA, Pemex, Petrobras, Shell, and Total. Later, in Paris, he consulted for Booz Allen Hamilton as a specialist in strategy, restructuring, and finance.

Cordeiro has been an advocate of sound monetary policy and dollarization in Eastern Europe and Latin America. His 1999 book La Segunda Muerte de Sucre provided academic backing for the change from the sucre to the dollar as the currency in Ecuador, where he is regarded as one of the thought leaders of this transformation.

Cordeiro is an international fellow of the World Academy of Art and Science (WAAS), executive director of the Ibero-American Futurists Network, Venezuela Node Chair of The Millennium Project, vice chair of Humanity Plus, and former director of the Club of Rome (Venezuela Chapter), the World Transhumanist Association, and the Extropy Institute. He has also been invited faculty at institutions such as the Institute of Developing Economies IDE – JETRO in Tokyo, Japan, the Monterrey Institute of Technology in Mexico, Singularity University at NASA Ames in Silicon Valley, California, the Moscow Institute of Physics and Technology (MIPT), and the Higher School of Economics in Russia.

Cordeiro has written a fortnightly opinion column in El Universal, the largest Venezuelan general newspaper, since 1996.

In 2008, Cordeiro conducted the last public interview with science fiction writer Arthur C. Clarke, in Clarke's home in Sri Lanka.

He is a lifetime member of the Sigma Xi, Tau Beta Pi, and Beta Gamma Sigma honor societies.

In the 2019 European Parliament election in Spain, Cordeiro ran for MEP as the candidate for the Movimiento Independiente Euro Latino, promoting the representation of Latin Americans in Spain and Europe and promoting science and research to build better societies.

== Philosophy ==
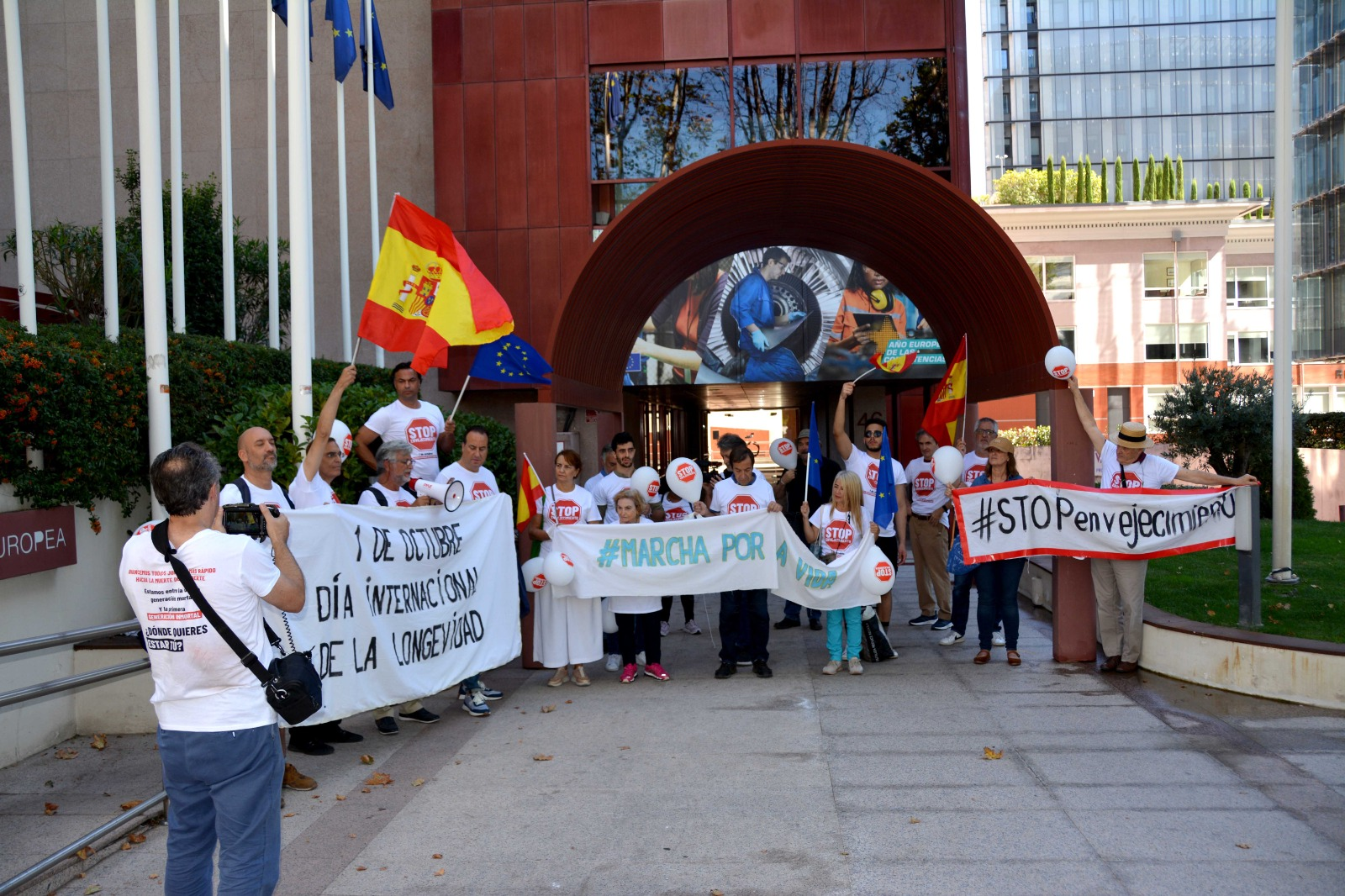
Cordeiro during the "International Longevity Day" picket in 2023

Cordeiro has been described as "a hopeless optimist always bursting with energy". He advises audiences to "forget flying cars and robot butlers ... the future will be a far more interesting place". He views nano, bio, info, and cogno (NBIC) as being the four main technologies that "are pushing mankind into the post-human age", and he predicts that "in the future we will be upgrading our brains every few years in the manner that we currently update our computer hardware".

In 2009, Cordeiro spoke at the European Futurists Conference in Lucerne about the concept of 'Singularity': "a not-too-distant moment when artificial intelligence overtakes the capabilities of the human mind – the point when we are going to merge with machines". As a teaching fellow of the Singularity University, he stated that "the purpose of Singularity University is to prepare humankind for this transformation".

Cordeiro coined the term 'Energularity' to refer to "the biggest change in the largest industry on our planet ... the Energy industry’s shift from fossil fuels to solar, wind, geothermal, or fusion". He also coined the term "Benesuela" as a contrast to "Venezuela" in reference to the educational situation in that country.

In a set of forecasts about Latin America in 2030, Cordeiro and the Millennium Project highlighted two extreme scenarios: "God is Latin American" and "Disintegration in Hell".

The New York Times has quoted Cordeiro as saying "The constitutional history of Latin America is the most convulsive in the world. Constitutions seem to have become like shirts, not even suits, which rulers put on and take off at their whim."

In line with forecasts by Ray Kurzweil that the Singularity will occur by 2045, Cordeiro predicts that "death will be optional by 2045". This will take place "thanks to exponential advances in artificial intelligence, tissue regeneration, stem cell treatments, organ printing, cryopreservation, and genetic or immunological therapies that will solve the problem of the aging of the human body".

== Books ==
- El Desafio Latinoamericano (1996)
- El Gran Tabu Venezolano: la desestatizacion y democratizacion del petroleo (1998)
- The Great Taboo (1998)
- Benesuela vs. Venezuela: el combate educativo del siglo (1998)
- La Segunda Muerte de Bolivar... y el Renacer de Venezuela (1998)
- La Segunda Muerte de Sucre... y el Renacer del Ecuador (1999)
- Pesos o dolares? (2000)
- El desafio latinoamericano y sus cinco grandes retos (2007)
- Constitutions Around the World: A Comparative View from Latin America (2009)
- Telephones and Economic Development: A Worldwide Long-Term (2010)
- Latinoamérica 2030: Estudio Delphi y Escenarios (2014)
- La Muerte de la Muerte: La posibilidad científica de la inmortalidad física y su defensa moral (2018)
