= Spanish Alternative =

Spanish Alternative Alternativa Española
- General Secretary: Rafaél López-Diéguez Gamoneda
- Founded: 21 April 2003
- Headquarters: C/ Bravo Murillo, nº 50, 1º B, 28003, Madrid
- Ideology: Conservatism; National conservatism Social conservatism Centralism; National Catholicism; Neo-Francoism; Euroscepticism; Spanish nationalism
- Political position: Far-right
- Religion: Catholicism
- National affiliation: ADÑ–Spanish Identity (2018–2024)
- Colours: Grey
- Mayors: 1 / 8,131
- Local Councils: 4 / 67,121

Website
- www.alternativaespanola.com

Spanish Alternative (Spanish: Alternativa Española, AES) is a far-right political party in Spain. It describes itself as "social Christian and cross-sectional". Its Secretary General is the lawyer and businessman Rafael López-Diéguez, former member of the far-right New Force, active formation during the Transition and managed by his father-in-law, the historic leader Blas Piñar, who was named honorary president of AES, a post which he held until his death in January 2014.

== History ==
Spanish Alternative was founded with the support of Fuerza Nueva Editorial; it was in its registered office where the party had its first headquarters. AES was founded in 21 of April 2003. According to its General Secretary, AES aroused "because the PP betrayed its Catholic voters and the Spanish people as a whole". It maintained contacts with the party Navarrese and Spanish Right (DNE).

== Ideology ==
AES holds its program declaration and its public action in four principles: the "defense of life" (opposition to any type of abortion), the "pro-family", "Christian roots" and the "unity of Spain". When the party has to place itself on the political spectrum, AES defines itself as a cross-sectional party that is positioned on the right in moral matter and on the left in social and economic matter. Thus, AES considers homosexual adoption to be an attack on the family and is against same-sex marriages and even same-sex civil unions. It has been described as akin to "fundamentalist Catholicism".

Spanish Alternative takes a hard line on the Autonomic State by proposing to abolish the autonomous communities. To the party's mind, the State of Autonomies is unviable and unsustainable because it constitutes an economic catastrophe, because it has been the main contributory factor to the present crisis, because it promotes the breach of the national integrity and cohesion in its continuing development and because it entails unequal rights among Spaniards depending on their place of birth or residence. However, AES would keep the provincial privileges of Navarre and the Basque Country.

Although AES doesn't use symbols of Franco's regime, the party has been described as neo-Francoist as well as being considered to be inheritor of New Force.

== Election results ==
In the municipal elections of 2015, the party gained five town councillors. Two of these councillors were elected in Las Labores, and one each were elected in Ampuero, Bárcena de Pie de Concha and Villanueva de la Condesa.

=== European Parliament ===
Election year	# of total votes	% of overall vote	# of seats won	Rank	Notes
2009	19,583 ▲	0.12% ▲	0 / 54	13 ▲	
2014	17,879	0.11%	0 / 54	25	Inside the coalition Social Impulse
2019	11,798	0.05%	0 / 54	26	Inside ADÑ - Spanish Identity

== Bibliography ==
- Ávila López, Enrique (2015), Modern Spain, Understanding Modern Nations, ABC-CLIO, 427, ISBN 978-1-61069-601-2
