= La Falange (1999) =

The Phalanx La Falange
- National chief: Manuel Andrino Lobo
- Founder: Gustavo Morales
- Founded: 1999
- Dissolved: 29 October 2024
- Split from: FE-JONS
- Merged into: FE-JONS
- Headquarters: Calle de Silva, 2, 28013, Madrid
- Student wing: Sindicato Español Universitario
- Youth wing: Juventudes de La Falange
- Ideology: Falangism; National syndicalism Euroscepticism; Anti-immigration; Republicanism
- Political position: Far-right
- National affiliation: ADÑ–Spanish Identity (2018–2024)
- European affiliation: Alliance for Peace and Freedom
- Colors: Red Black

Party flag

Website
- lafalange.org

La Falange (English: The Phalanx), also known as FE/La Falange, was a Spanish political party registered in 1999. The party originated as a split of the Falange Española de las JONS, led by Gustavo Morales and Jesús López. Ideologically the party claims to be a successor of the original Falange Española of the 1930s, and follower of the ideas of José Antonio Primo de Rivera, Ramiro Ledesma Ramos, Onésimo Redondo and Julio Ruiz de Alda.

== History ==
FE/La Falange was founded in 1999 after a split in FE-JONS, that was the result of an internal conflict between the faction of Diego Márquez Horrillo and the faction of Gustavo Morales. Finally, the first one won and the sector that supported Morales left FE-JONS. In the local elections of 1999 the party gained three town councillors. Since 2000-2001 the party adopted more xenophobic positions, in contrast to traditional falangism. Due to this ideological changes, a sector known as Falange Auténtica split in 2002.

In 2005 the party split into two factions: one led by José Fernando Cantalapiedra, known as the National Front, and other led by Manuel Andrino, that was called Frente Español. From 2005 to 2009, both factions would participate in the elections with those brands, leaving the brand La Falange virtually dead. Finally, in 2009, the court ruled in favor of the Andrino faction, which started using again the original name.

In 2013 the organization was part of the political movement and election coalition La España en Marcha (LEM), inspired by the success of Golden Dawn in Greece.

The organization was extremely hostile to Basque and Catalan independentism. In 2013 members of the organization participated in an assault in Madrid against a Catalan cultural centre during the celebrations of the National Day of Catalonia, and it has also participated in unionist demonstrations and burned estelades (Catlan independentist flags).

Electorally the party has only had elected representatives at the local level. Its best result was 2 town councillors elected in the lists of the Independent Party of Becerril de la Sierra. This party was actually a coalition between FE/La Falange, National Democracy and local independents.

On October 29, 2024, the party announced it would be rejoining FE-JONS after 25 years.

== Electoral Performance ==
=== Cortes Generales ===
Election	Leader	Votes	%	#	Congress	Senate	Gov't	Notes
2016	Manuel Andrino Lobo	254	0.00	43rd	0 / 350	0 / 207	No	No representation

=== European Parliament ===
Election year	# of total votes	% of overall vote	# of seats won	Rank	Notes
2019	11,798	0.05%	0 / 54	26	Inside ADÑ - Spanish Identity

== See also ==
- FET-JONS
- Falange Española
- JONS
