= Jordi Sebastià =

Spanish politician

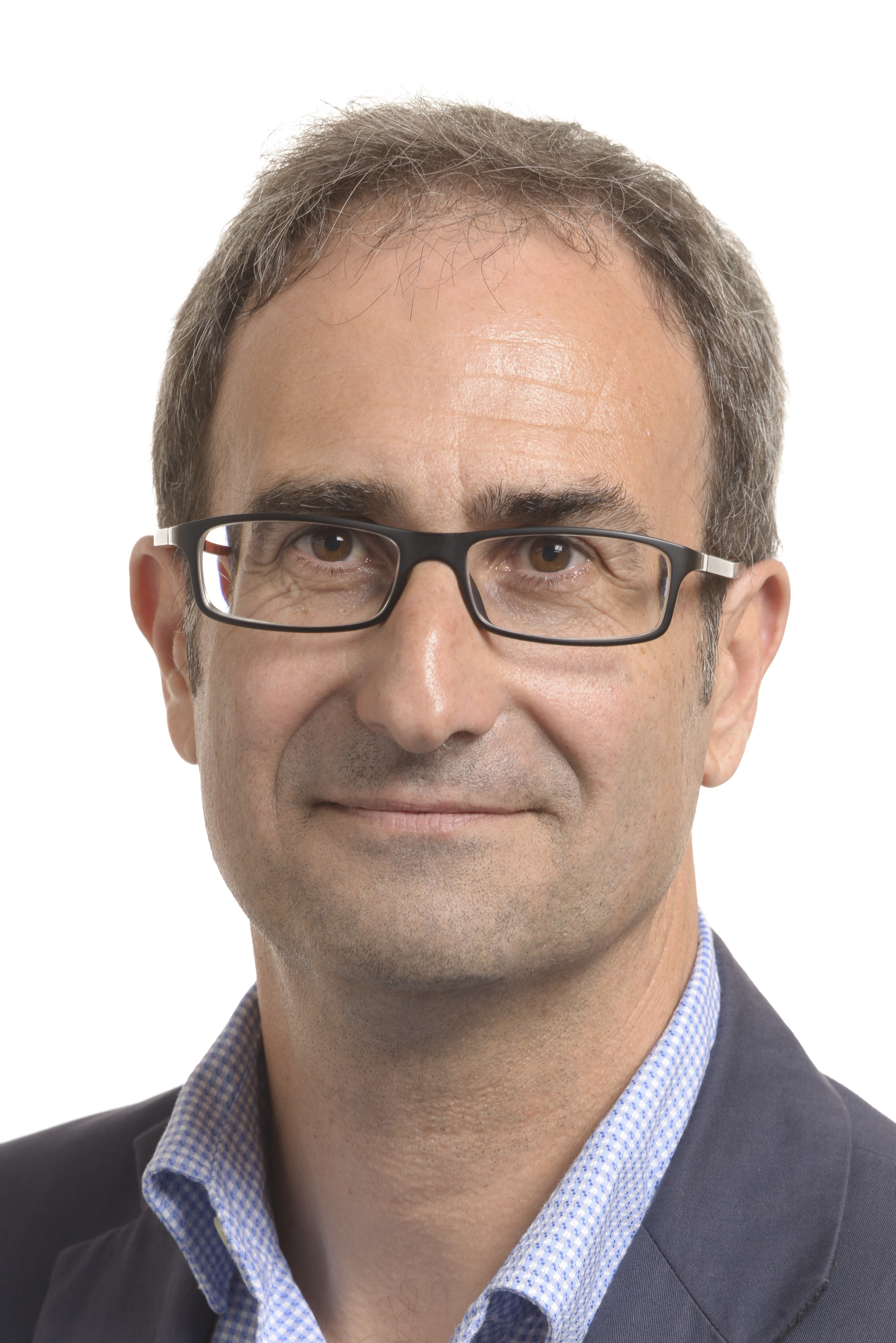

Jordi Vicent Sebastià i Talavera (born 1966) is a Spanish professor and politician. He was the mayor of Burjassot (2011–2014) and a Member of the European Parliament (2014–2016).

== Biography ==
Sebastià became a professor of journalism at the University of Valencia in 2004, and has written for El Temps. He has also written independent journalism and is the author of several books.

Representing the Valencian Nationalist Bloc (BNV) within the Coalició Compromís, Sebastià was elected to the town hall of his hometown of Burjassot near Valencia in 1999. From 2003, he was his party's spokesman in the town hall. In 2011, he was elected mayor as fellow left-wing parties Socialist Party of the Valencian Country (PSPV) and United Left of the Valencian Country (EUPV) voted to invest him and impede the People's Party (PP) candidate Cristina Subielda. The agreement maintained that the PSPV would govern in the last year of the mandate.

Sebastià was indicted in court for a December 2012 incident in which he ordered the dismantling of a stall that the far-right party España 2000 had erected without municipal permission. The party accused him of impeding the right to free speech, and of inciting hatred. The case was dismissed on appeal for the second time in March 2014.

In March 2014, Sebastià received 54% of the votes to lead Compromís in the 2014 European Parliament election in Spain, in which they would be aligned with parties including Greens Equo and Chunta Aragonesista. He was the sole member elected from his coalition, which was called the European Spring. Per an agreement between the two parties, he ceded his seat to Equo's Florent Marcellesi in October 2016.

In April 2019, Sebastià was chosen to lead the coalition for the 2019 European Parliament election in Spain, now named Commitment to Europe. The party's votes fell by over 10,000, dropping from 1.92% to 1.31% and losing their only seat.
