= Villanueva de la Condesa =

Coordinates: 42°09′N 5°06′W

Villanueva de la Condesa, Spain
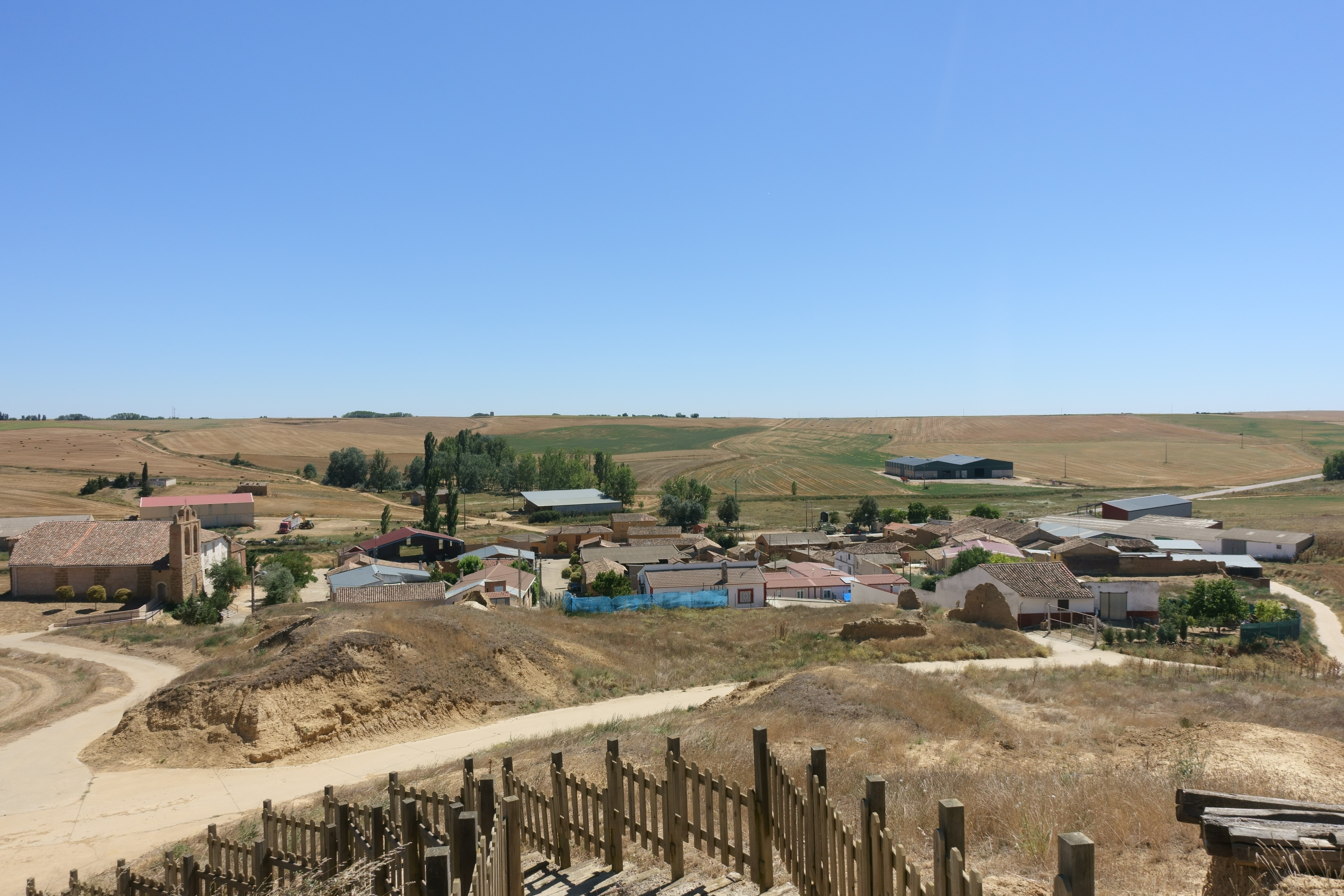
- General view of Villanueva de la Condesa (Valladolid, Spain).
- Interactive map of Villanueva de la Condesa, Spain
- Country: Spain
- Autonomous community: Castile and León
- Province: Valladolid
- Municipality: Villanueva de la Condesa

Area
  - Total: 11.37 km^{2} (4.39 sq mi)
- Elevation: 797 m (2,615 ft)

Population (2025-01-01)
  - Total: 64
  - Density: 5.6/km^{2} (15/sq mi)
- Time zone: UTC+1 (CET)
  - Summer (DST): UTC+2 (CEST)

Villanueva de la Condesa is a municipality located in the province of Valladolid, Castile and León, Spain. According to the 2004 census (INE), the municipality had a population of 44 inhabitants.
