= ADÑ–Spanish Identity =

ADÑ–Spanish Identity ADÑ–Identidad Española
- Founded: 2018
- Dissolved: 2024
- Ideology: Euroscepticism; Anti-immigration; Spanish nationalism Neo-fascism; Factions: Falangism
- Political position: Far-right
- Slogan: Somos como somos. Somos como tú. ¡Pensamos como tú! (literally We are who we are. We are like you. We think like you!)
- Members: See list: DN; AES; FE-JONS; La Falange

Website
- adñ.org

ADÑ–Spanish Identity (Spanish: ADÑ–Identidad Española), also known as FE de las JONS–Alternativa Española–La Falange–Democracia Nacional, was a far-right eurosceptic Spanish political coalition created for the 2019 European Parliament election, formed by the far-right parties FE de las JONS, Alternativa Española, La Falange and National Democracy.

== History ==
In October 2018 the political parties La Falange, (Note: La Falange (FE) merged with the FE-JONS in 2024.) Spanish Alternative, National Democracy and Falange Española de las JONS announced that they would take part in the 2019 European Parliament election as a coalition named ADÑ Spanish Identity.

In 30 of April 2019, the candidature was proclaimed by the Junta Electoral Central, with the name FE de las JONS-Alternativa Española-La Falange-Democracia Nacional, with the acronym ADÑ (Ante Todo España, in English: Above All Spain).

== Composition ==
Name	Ideology	Position	Leader	MPs	Senators	MEPs
National Democracy	Spanish nationalism Hard euroscepticism	Far-right	Manuel Canduela	0 / 350	0 / 266	0 / 54
Falange Española de las JONS	Spanish nationalism Falangism	Far-right	Norberto Pico	0 / 350	0 / 266	0 / 54
Spanish Alternative	Spanish nationalism National conservatism	Far-right	Rafael López-Diéguez	0 / 350	0 / 266	0 / 54

== Ideology ==
The coalition takes inspiration in the aesthetic and ideology of other "identitarian" parties in Europe, wanting to take electoral advantage of the Euroscepticism, the suspicion in the PP and the fear to a change in the demographic composition of the country. The party wants to leave the Eurozone and take back "national sovereignty". It also wants to restrict immigration.

== Election results ==
=== European Parliament ===
Election year	# of total votes	% of overall vote	# of seats won	Rank
2019	11,798	0.05%	0 / 54	26

== See also ==
- 2019 European Parliament election in Spain
