= Commitment to Europe =

Commitment to Europe Compromiso por Europa (Spanish) Compromís per Europa (Valencian)
- Leader: Jordi Sebastià
- Founded: April 2019
- Dissolved: 2020
- Preceded by: European Spring
- Ideology: Left-wing nationalism Eco-socialism
- Political position: Left-wing
- European Parliament: 0 / 54

Commitment to Europe (Spanish: Compromiso por Europa, Valencian: Compromís per Europa, CpE) was a Spanish electoral list in the 2019 European Parliament election in Spain made up from regionalist parties. It was the successor of the European Spring in 2014.

Since the 2019 election, two member parties, the Valencian Nationalist Bloc and the Caballas Coalition, have dissolved with the members of the parties joining other regionalist parties.

== Composition ==
Party	Scope
Commitment Coalition (Compromís)	Valencian Community
Valencian Nationalist Bloc (Bloc)	Valencian Community
Valencian People's Initiative (IdPV)	Valencian Community
Greens Equo of the Valencian Country (VerdsEquo)	Valencian Community
More for Majorca (Més)	Balearic Islands
En Masse (En Marea)	Galicia
Aragonese Union (CHA)	Aragon
New Canaries (NCa)	Canary Islands
Castilian Party (PCAS)	Castile and León, Castilla–La Mancha, Madrid
Caballas Coalition (Caballas)	Ceuta
Coalition for Melilla (CpM)	Melilla
Andalusian People's Initiative (iniciativa)	Andalusia
Andalusian Left (IzA)	Andalusia
The Greens of Europe (LVdeE)	—

== Electoral performance ==
=== European Parliament ===
European Parliament
Election	Vote	%	Score	Seats	+/–
2019	296,491	1.32%	9th	0 / 54	1
