= Movimiento Independiente Euro Latino =

Spanish political party

- Leader: José Luis Cordeiro
- Founded: 2019
- Headquarters: Madrid
- Ideology: European Federalism; Latin American integration Pan-Hispanism

Website
- SomosMIEL

The Movimiento Independiente Euro Latino (MIEL) (Independent Movement of European Latinos) is a Spanish political party founded in 2019. Among its aims are the representation of Latin Americans in Spain and Europe, and the promotion of science and research as engines to build better societies.

== Elections ==
The Movimiento Independiente Euro Latino presented its candidacy for the 2019 European Parliament election in Spain, which was announced on 30 April 2019. At the top of the electoral list was José Luis Cordeiro, an engineer from the Massachusetts Institute of Technology (MIT).

The MIEL ran for election for the first time during the 2019 European Parliament election, obtaining 6,719 votes in Spain.
