= Volt Spain =

Volt Spain Volt España
- Leader: Daniel Medina
- Founded: January 25, 2019
- Headquarters: Madrid
- Ideology: Social liberalism Pro-Europeanism; European federalism
- Political position: Centre to centre-left
- European political alliance: Volt Europa
- Colors: Purple
- European Parliament (Spanish seats): 0 / 61

Website
- voltespana.org

Volt Spain (short name: Volt, Spanish: Volt España) is a political party in Spain and member of Volt Europa, a progressive and federalist European political alliance, which advocates for closer European and cross-border cooperation and is characterised by its supranational character. As part of Volt, it has a Member of the European Parliament, Damian Boeselager, who represents the party there.

== History ==
Volt Spain was officially registered as a party on 25 January 2019, as the third national section, and contested the 2019 European Parliament elections for the first time. It obtained 32,291 votes (0.14%) and thus did not win a mandate. In May 2021, the party contested the municipal elections in Madrid for the first time since the European elections, but did not win a mandate. During the municipal elections, representatives of the right-wing populist Vox warned against confusing Volt with their own party, as the placement of the ballot papers next to each other was, according to them, intended to cause confusion. In fact, the order of the ballot papers was based on the order of the candidacies submitted.

Volt Europa electoral ballot for the Madrid community elections

In September 2021, the party supported the referendum for the legalisation of euthanasia in Italy and collected signatures for the initiative in Spain. The party took part in a local election for the first time in May 2023.

The average age of Volt in Spain is 35. The party plans to run in the 2024 European elections with top candidate Clara Panella Gómez.

== Policies ==
In its programme, the party strongly advocates European federalism with the goal of a federal European state. Volt sees close European cooperation as a central necessity in order to successfully meet challenges such as digitalisation, the fight against climate change and social inequality. Further demands of the party are more transparency in politics and an improvement of public administration, which is to be digitalised and built on open-source software. Gender, religion or origin should have no influence on social status.

=== Judiciary ===
The party calls for a reform of the judiciary. In order to avoid politicisation and deadlock, a specialised committee of judges' associations, universities and bar associations should be introduced to elect members of the General Council of the Judiciary. In addition, the Attorney General should be appointed by parliament, not by the executive, to ensure that public interests are paramount.

=== Social policy ===
In order to support students, senior citizens and low-income families, subsidized housing, modelled on Austria, is to be promoted and the privatisation of public resources in the housing sector is to be stopped.

=== Agriculture, environmental and animal protection ===
The welfare and dignity of animals should be enshrined in the constitution and animal rights should be enshrined in civil law. Bullfighting is to be banned in Spain and, along the way, tax breaks and financial state subsidies are to be eliminated. The party also advocates hunting restrictions and the design of a more sustainable agriculture with a common European food policy to avoid food waste and environmental damage.

Marine protected areas are to be expanded to protect flora and fauna from intensive shipping. Nature conservation is to be promoted to counter the advancing desertification and climate crisis and to preserve Spain's biodiversity.

=== EU reform ===
Volt proposes that the EU president be directly elected in future. The European Union should evolve and be governed by a European government headed by a prime minister elected by the European Parliament. To this end, the EU should first become more transparent and form a complete economic and monetary union. Migration is to be organised through binding admission quotas.

=== Catalonia ===
The party has spoken out against Catalan independence and sees no currently existing restrictions and violations of civil rights in Catalonia that would justify a unilateral declaration of independence. Instead, the leaders call for dialogue to end the political deadlock.

== Elections ==
=== European Parliament ===
Election	Leader	Votes	%	Seats
2019	Bruno Sánchez-Andrade	32,291	0.14 (#13)	0 / 59
2024	Rachele Arciulo; Ferry Djamchidi	22,020	0.13 (#18)	0 / 61

=== Parliamentary election in Andalusia 2022 ===
Volt contested the parliamentary election in Andalusia with a 40-page manifesto, but only fielded candidates in Málaga, and thus only in one of the eight provinces. The party received 904 votes (0.14% in Málaga, 0.02% in all of Andalusia).
