= European Spring (Spanish electoral alliance) =

European Spring Primavera Europea
- Leader: Jordi Sebastià i Talavera
- Founded: 2014
- Dissolved: 2019
- Succeeded by: Commitment to Europe
- Ideology: Green politics Ecologism; Eco-socialism; Europeanism; Federalism
- Political position: Left-wing

Website
- www.primaveraeuropea.eu

European Spring (Spanish: Primavera Europea; PE) was a Spanish electoral list in the European Parliament election in 2014 made up from several left-wing parties, including Coalició Compromís and Equo.

== Composition ==
Party	Scope
Commitment Coalition (Compromís)	Valencian Community
Valencian Nationalist Bloc (Bloc)	Valencian Community
Valencian People's Initiative (IdPV)	Valencian Community
The Greens–Ecologist Left of the Valencian Country (EV–EE)	Valencian Community
People of Compromís (Gent)	Valencian Community
Equo (Equo)	—
Aragonese Union (CHA)	Aragon
Participatory Democracy (Participa)	—
Castilian Party (PCAS)	Castile and León, Castilla–La Mancha, Madrid
For a Fairer World (PUM+J)	—
Independent Socialists of Extremadura (SIEx)	Extremadura
Caballas Coalition (Caballas)	Ceuta

== Electoral performance ==
=== European Parliament ===
European Parliament
Election	Vote	%	Score	Seats	+/–
2014	302,266	1.92%	10th	1 / 54	1
