= Falange Española de las JONS (1976) =

Spanish Falange of the Councils of the National Syndicalist Offensive Falange Española de las Juntas de Ofensiva Nacional Sindicalista
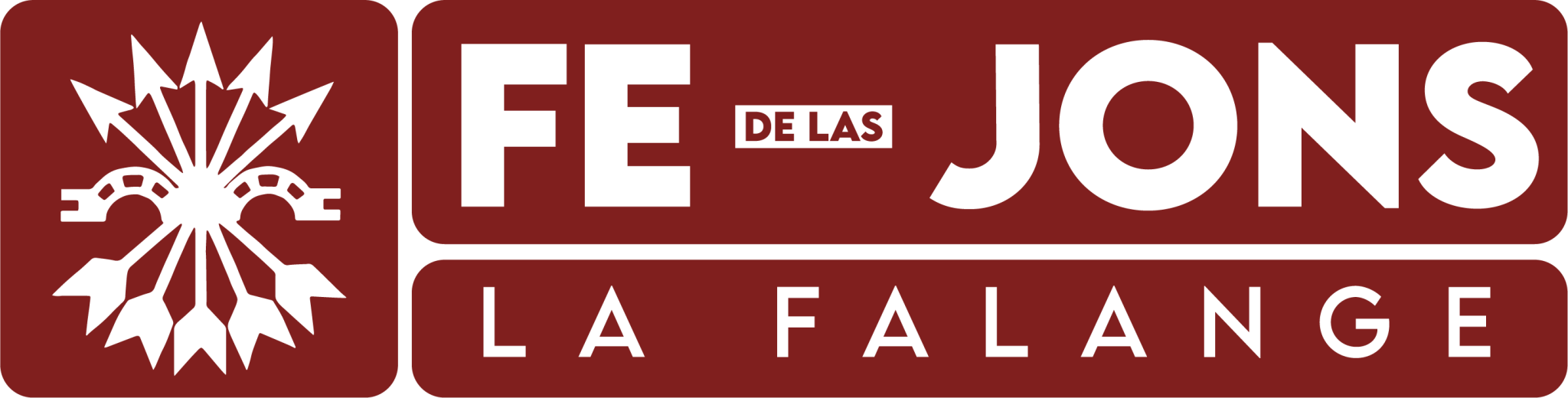
- Abbreviation: FE de las JONS
- Leader: Norberto Pedro Pico Sanabria
- Founded: 4 October 1976
- Split from: FET y de las JONS
- Headquarters: C/ Carranza, 13, 2º, 28004 Madrid
- Newspaper: Nosotros En Marcha (since 2024); En Marcha (2017–2024); Patria Sindicalista (1977–2017)
- Ideology: Falangism; National syndicalism; Spanish nationalism; Ultranationalism; Neo-fascism
- Political position: Far-right (Self-described: Third position)
- Religion: Roman Catholicism
- National affiliation: National Alliance July 18 (1977); National Union (1979–1982); ADÑ–Spanish Identity (2018–2024)
- International affiliation: International Sovereigntist League (since 2025)
- Colors: Red Black
- Anthem: Cara al Sol

Election symbol
- Yoke and arrows

Party flag

Website
- www.falange.es

Falange Española de las Juntas de Ofensiva Nacional Sindicalista (Spanish for "Spanish Falange of the Councils of the National Syndicalist Offensive", FE de las JONS or FE-JONS) is a Spanish political party registered in 1976, originating from a faction of the previous Falange Española Tradicionalista y de las Juntas de Ofensiva Nacional Sindicalista (FET y de las JONS). The word Falange is Spanish for phalanx. Members of the party are called Falangists (Spanish: falangistas). Widely described as far-right and neo-fascist, the party self-identifies with the Third Position. Its main ideological bases include Falangism, national syndicalism, Spanish nationalism and ultranationalism.

== History ==
FE-JONS was the first political party legalized by the Spanish Transition, on 4 October 1976. After the death of dictator Francisco Franco in 1975, a destabilization campaign led by some sectors of the right, trying to repeat the strategy of the 1930s, began. Originally, FE-JONS was linked with the neofascist terrorism in Spain, along with other similar groups. A prominent member of the party was linked with the 1977 Massacre of Atocha. This strategy continued in the following years, although the party also participated in elections and fully legal activities. In 1980 an "escuadrilla" (squadron) of the party killed Juan Carlos García Pérez in Ciudad Lineal, Madrid.

After the electoral defeat in the 1977 general election, in which the candidacies openly defending neo-francoist positions gained less than the 1% of the vote, the party begun a gradual distancing from the Franco regime, highlighting the thoughts of pre-Franco falangists, like José Antonio Primo de Rivera or Ramiro Ledesma. In 1979 the Círculos Doctrinales José Antonio joined the organization, in an attempt to unite neofalangists under a single political party. The same year FE-JONS formed a coalition with Fuerza Nueva and various Carlist political organizations called National Union. The coalition gained 1 MP in the elections of that year, gaining 378,964 votes (2.11%). The party did not participate in the 23-F coup attempt.

Raimundo Fernández-Cuesta, the "National Chief" of the party since its foundation, resigned in 1983. Diego Márquez Horrillo (1928-2014) was elected as the new chief the same year. Since then the party fully broke with Francoism, declaring itself the successor of the original Falange Española de las JONS, and fully rejecting the "Unification Decree" of 1937.

In 1999, a sector of the party split, forming La Falange. In 2004, the small faction Falange Española Independiente (FEI) joined FE-JONS. In 2011 the organization elected a new national chief, Norberto Pedro Pico Sanabria. Pico was an ex-member of the FEI. In 2012 another small faction, Mesa Nacional Falangista, joined FE-JONS.

In March 2020, Luz Belinda Rodríguez, a member of the Parliament of Andalusia who had left Vox to become an unaffiliated legislator in January 2020, reportedly joined the Falange and vowed to bring the initiatives of FE-JONS to the Parliament of Andalusia. She then quit the Falange to found her own party.

On 8 July 2023, the Junta Electoral Central gave permission for the Falange to use their anthem Cara al Sol in advertisement, citing that the lyrics themselves do not violate the Democratic Memory Law and do not incite conflict or hatred against any specific group.

On 29 October 2024, La Falange announced it would be rejoining FE-JONS after 25 years.

== Ideology ==
FE-JONS has been described as the main falangist group active in Spain. The party's ideology has been variously described as neo-fascist, ultranationalist and xenophobic.

== Organization ==
=== Symbols ===
Symbols of Falangism:

- Yoke and arrows, the symbol of the Catholic Monarchs.
- The blue shirt, a symbol of industrial workers.
- Cara al Sol, "Facing the sun", its anthem.
- A flag with red and black vertical stripes.
- The Swan as a symbol of Grand Inquisitor Cisneros (1436–1517) (universitarian branch).

=== Leadership ===
National Chief		Term
1.	Raimundo Fernández-Cuesta	1976 – 1983
2.	Diego Márquez Horrillo	1983 – 2011
3.	Norberto Pico Sanabria	2011 – present

== Electoral performance ==
=== Cortes Generales ===
Election	Leading candidate	Congress				Senate		Government
Election	Leading candidate	Votes	%	Seats	+/–	Seats	+/–	Government
1977		46,548	0.25	0 / 350	New	0 / 208	New	No seats
1979		Within National Union		1 / 350	1	0 / 208	0	Opposition
1982		2,528	0.01	0 / 350	1	0 / 208	0	No seats
1986		43,449	0.22	0 / 350	0	0 / 208	0	No seats
1989	Diego Márquez Horrillo	24,025	0.12	0 / 350	0	0 / 208	0	No seats
1993	Diego Márquez Horrillo	8,000	0.03	0 / 350	0	0 / 208	0	No seats
2004	Diego Márquez Horrillo	12,266	0.05	0 / 350	0	0 / 208	0	No seats
2008		14,023	0.05	0 / 350	0	0 / 208	0	No seats
2011		2,901	0.01	0 / 350	0	0 / 208	0	No seats
2015		7,495	0.03	0 / 350	0	0 / 208	0	No seats
2016		9,862	0.04	0 / 350	0	0 / 208	0	No seats
Apr. 2019		641	0.00	0 / 350	0	0 / 208	0	Snap election
Nov. 2019		608	0.00	0 / 350	0	0 / 208	0	No seats
2023	Norberto Pico	4,683	0.02	0 / 350	0	0 / 208	0	No seats

=== European Parliament ===
Election	Leading candidate	Votes	%	Seats	+/–	EP Group
1987	Diego Márquez Horrillo	23,407	0.12	0 / 61	New	–
1989	Diego Márquez Horrillo	24,340	0.15	0 / 61	0	–
1994	Diego Márquez Horrillo	11,733	0.06	0 / 61	0	–
2004	Diego Márquez Horrillo	4,484	0.03	0 / 61	0	–
2009	Diego Márquez Horrillo	10,031	0.06	0 / 54	0	–
2014	Norberto Pico	21,687	0.14	0 / 54	0	–
2019	Norberto Pico	Within ADÑ–Spanish Identity		0 / 59	0	–
2024	Norberto Pico	9,677	0.06	0 / 61	0	–

== See also ==
- FET-JONS
- Falange Española
- JONS
- Falangism in Latin America
- Lebanese Phalanges
- National Radical Camp Falanga
