= Results of the 2024 European Parliament election in Spain =

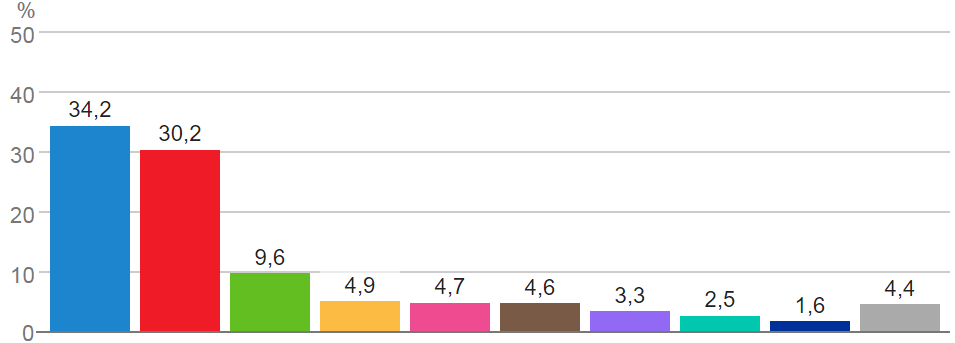
(Spain)	Main: 2024 European Parliament election in Spain
← 2019 9 June 2024 2029 →
Party		Votes	%	Seats
	PP	5,996,627	34.2%	22
	PSOE	5,291,102	30.2%	20
	Vox	1,688,255	9.6%	6
	Ahora Repúblicas	860,660	4.9%	3
	Sumar	818,015	4.7%	3
	SALF	803,545	4.6%	3
	Podemos	578,007	3.3%	2
	Junts UE	442,140	2.5%	1
	CEUS	284,888	1.6%	1
	Others	764,199	4.4%	0
Total		17,527,438	100.0%	61

This article presents the results breakdown of the election to the European Parliament held in Spain on 9 June 2024. The following tables show detailed results in each of the country's 17 autonomous communities and in the autonomous cities of Ceuta and Melilla.

== Nationwide ==
← Summary of the 9 June 2024 European Parliament election results in Spain →
Parties and alliances	Popular vote			Seats	
Parties and alliances	Votes	%	±pp	Total	+/−
People's Party (PP)	5,996,627	34.21	+14.06	22	+9
Spanish Socialist Workers' Party (PSOE)	5,291,102	30.19	−2.67	20	−1
Vox (Vox)	1,688,255	9.63	+3.42	6	+2
Republics Now (ERC–EH Bildu–BNG–Ara Més)	860,660	4.91	−0.67	3	±0
Unite (Sumar)^{1}	818,015	4.67	n/a	3	±0
The Party is Over (Se Acabó La Fiesta)	803,545	4.58	New	3	+3
We Can (Podemos)^{1}	578,007	3.30	n/a	2	−1
Together and Free for Europe (Junts UE)^{2}	442,140	2.52	−2.02	1	−2
Coalition for a Solidary Europe (CEUS)	284,888	1.63	−1.19	1	±0
Animalist Party with the Environment (PACMA)^{3}	135,691	0.77	−0.55	0	±0
Citizens–Party of the Citizenry (Cs)	122,292	0.70	−11.48	0	−8
Workers' Front (FO)	66,039	0.38	New	0	±0
The Forgotten Spain Exists–Municipalists–Fair World (Existe)^{4}	40,292	0.23	+0.06	0	±0
Spanish Left (IzqEsp)	32,766	0.19	New	0	±0
Feminists to the Congress (PFAC)	29,236	0.17	New	0	±0
Justice Europe (IE)	26,611	0.15	New	0	±0
Andalusia Now (Andalucistas)^{5}	22,965	0.13	+0.02	0	±0
Volt Spain (Volt)	22,020	0.13	−0.01	0	±0
Blank Seats to Leave Empty Seats (EB)	19,586	0.11	New	0	±0
Communist Party of the Workers of Spain (PCTE)	15,281	0.09	±0.00	0	±0
Pirates–Rebel Alliance–European Pirates (Pirates/Rebeldes)	14,484	0.08	+0.01	0	±0
PCPE–PCPC Coalition (PCPE–PCPC)^{6}	11,177	0.06	−0.07	0	±0
Spanish Phalanx of the CNSO (FE de las JONS)^{7}	9,677	0.06	+0.01	0	±0
Spanish Food Sovereignty (SAE)	9,311	0.05	New	0	±0
Believe in Europe (Cree en Europa)^{8}	9,276	0.05	−0.01	0	±0
Zero Cuts (Recortes Cero)	7,618	0.04	−0.18	0	±0
Humanist Party (PH)	6,550	0.04	±0.00	0	±0
Country and Rural Movement (PMR)	6,541	0.04	New	0	±0
Salamanca–Zamora–León PREPAL (PREPAL)	6,456	0.04	New	0	±0
Galician Party (GLG)	5,719	0.03	New	0	±0
Future (F)	5,671	0.03	New	0	±0
Together for Extremadura (JUEX)	5,611	0.03	New	0	±0
Workers' Revolutionary Current (CRT)	5,165	0.03	New	0	±0
Extremadurans (PREx–CREx)	3,509	0.02	−0.03	0	±0
Blank ballots	124,655	0.71	−0.26		
Total	17,527,438			61	+2
Valid votes	17,527,438	99.29	+0.15		
Invalid votes	124,569	0.71	−0.15		
Votes cast / turnout	17,652,007	46.39	−14.34		
Abstentions	20,398,279	53.61	+14.34		
Registered voters	38,050,286				
Sources
Footnotes: ^{1} Within the United We Can Change Europe and Commitment to Europe alliances in the 2019 election.; ^{2} Together and Free for Europe results are compared to Free for Europe totals in the 2019 election.; ^{3} Animalist Party with the Environment results are compared to Animalist Party Against Mistreatment of Animals totals in the 2019 election.; ^{4} The Forgotten Spain Exists–Municipalists–Fair World results are to the combined totals of For a Fairer World and Centrists for Europe in the 2019 election.; ^{5} Andalusia Now results are compared to Andalusia by Herself totals in the 2019 election.; ^{6} PCPE–PCPC Coalition results are compared to Communists totals in the 2019 election.; ^{7} Spanish Phalanx of the CNSO results are compared to FE de las JONS–Spanish Alternative–La Falange–National Democracy totals in the 2019 election.; ^{8} Believe in Europe results are compared to With You, We Are Democracy totals in the 2019 election.

== Autonomous communities ==
=== Andalusia ===
← Summary of the 9 June 2024 European Parliament election results in Andalusia
Parties and alliances	Popular vote		
Parties and alliances	Votes	%	±pp
People's Party (PP)	1,104,516	37.86	+15.61
Spanish Socialist Workers' Party (PSOE)	938,023	32.15	−8.38
Vox (Vox)	318,674	10.92	+3.36
The Party is Over (Se Acabó La Fiesta)	181,071	6.21	New
Unite Andalusia (Sumar Andalucía)^{1}	148,901	5.10	n/a
We Can (Podemos)^{1}	82,168	2.82	n/a
Animalist Party with the Environment (PACMA)^{2}	23,202	0.80	−0.64
Citizens–Party of the Citizenry (Cs)	21,824	0.75	−12.26
Andalusia Now (Andalucistas)^{3}	19,408	0.67	+0.16
Workers' Front (FO)	8,895	0.30	New
Spanish Left (IzqEsp)	5,699	0.20	New
Volt Spain (Volt)	4,755	0.16	−0.01
Justice Europe (IE)	4,169	0.14	New
Feminists to the Congress (PFAC)	3,726	0.13	New
The Forgotten Spain Exists–Municipalists–Fair World (Existe)^{4}	3,620	0.12	−0.05
Blank Seats to Leave Empty Seats (EB)	3,003	0.10	New
Republics Now (ERC–EH Bildu–BNG–Ara Més)	2,923	0.10	+0.03
Communist Party of the Workers of Spain (PCTE)	2,813	0.10	+0.01
PCPE–PCPC Coalition (PCPE–PCPC)^{5}	2,097	0.07	−0.09
Spanish Food Sovereignty (SAE)	1,905	0.07	New
Believe in Europe (Cree en Europa)^{6}	1,597	0.05	+0.01
Spanish Phalanx of the CNSO (FE de las JONS)^{7}	1,510	0.05	±0.00
Pirates–Rebel Alliance–European Pirates (Pirates/Rebeldes)	1,252	0.04	−0.01
Zero Cuts (Recortes Cero)	1,249	0.04	−0.17
Humanist Party (PH)	1,113	0.04	±0.00
Together and Free for Europe (Junts UE)^{8}	1,002	0.03	−0.03
Future (F)	997	0.03	New
Coalition for a Solidary Europe (CEUS)	775	0.03	−0.05
Country and Rural Movement (PMR)	755	0.03	New
Workers' Revolutionary Current (CRT)	657	0.02	New
Together for Extremadura (JUEX)	434	0.01	New
Galician Party (GLG)	393	0.01	New
Salamanca–Zamora–León PREPAL (PREPAL)	377	0.01	New
Extremadurans (PREx–CREx)	297	0.01	−0.01
Blank ballots	23,589	0.81	−0.22
Total	2,917,389		
Valid votes	2,917,389	99.07	+0.46
Invalid votes	27,446	0.93	−0.46
Votes cast / turnout	2,944,835	43.63	−14.82
Abstentions	3,803,957	56.37	+14.82
Registered voters	6,748,792		
Sources
Footnotes: ^{1} Within the United We Can Change Europe and Commitment to Europe alliances in the 2019 election.; ^{2} Animalist Party with the Environment results are compared to Animalist Party Against Mistreatment of Animals totals in the 2019 election.; ^{3} Andalusia Now results are compared to Andalusia by Herself totals in the 2019 election.; ^{4} The Forgotten Spain Exists–Municipalists–Fair World results are to the combined totals of For a Fairer World and Centrists for Europe in the 2019 election.; ^{5} PCPE–PCPC Coalition results are compared to Communists totals in the 2019 election.; ^{6} Believe in Europe results are compared to With You, We Are Democracy totals in the 2019 election.; ^{7} Spanish Phalanx of the CNSO results are compared to FE de las JONS–Spanish Alternative–La Falange–National Democracy totals in the 2019 election.; ^{8} Together and Free for Europe results are compared to Free for Europe totals in the 2019 election.

=== Aragon ===
← Summary of the 9 June 2024 European Parliament election results in Aragon
Parties and alliances	Popular vote		
Parties and alliances	Votes	%	±pp
People's Party (PP)	194,332	37.14	+15.43
Spanish Socialist Workers' Party (PSOE)	158,374	30.27	−5.91
Vox (Vox)	60,294	11.52	+3.61
Unite Aragon (Sumar Aragón)^{1}	26,683	5.10	n/a
The Party is Over (Se Acabó La Fiesta)	26,609	5.09	New
We Can (Podemos)^{1}	15,986	3.06	n/a
Aragon Exists–The Forgotten Spain Exists–Municipalists–Fair World (Existe)^{2}	15,286	2.92	+2.81
Citizens–Party of the Citizenry (Cs)	4,642	0.89	−16.43
Animalist Party with the Environment (PACMA)^{3}	3,045	0.58	−0.44
Workers' Front (FO)	2,823	0.54	New
Republics Now (ERC–EH Bildu–BNG–Ara Més)^{4}	1,553	0.30	+0.03
Spanish Left (IzqEsp)	1,411	0.27	New
Blank Seats to Leave Empty Seats (EB)	1,158	0.22	New
Justice Europe (IE)	967	0.18	New
Feminists to the Congress (PFAC)	802	0.15	New
Volt Spain (Volt)	592	0.11	−0.04
Communist Party of the Workers of Spain (PCTE)	561	0.11	+0.02
Spanish Phalanx of the CNSO (FE de las JONS)^{5}	436	0.08	+0.01
Spanish Food Sovereignty (SAE)	389	0.07	New
Zero Cuts (Recortes Cero)	388	0.07	−0.17
Pirates–Rebel Alliance–European Pirates (Pirates/Rebeldes)	360	0.07	−0.01
Believe in Europe (Cree en Europa)^{6}	304	0.06	+0.04
Workers' Revolutionary Current (CRT)	295	0.06	New
Together and Free for Europe (Junts UE)^{7}	214	0.04	−0.13
PCPE–PCPC Coalition (PCPE–PCPC)^{8}	199	0.04	−0.09
Coalition for a Solidary Europe (CEUS)	193	0.04	±0.00
Humanist Party (PH)	172	0.03	±0.00
Future (F)	150	0.03	New
Country and Rural Movement (PMR)	130	0.02	New
Andalusia Now (Andalucistas)^{9}	101	0.02	+0.01
Salamanca–Zamora–León PREPAL (PREPAL)	74	0.01	New
Galician Party (GLG)	69	0.01	New
Together for Extremadura (JUEX)	55	0.01	New
Extremadurans (PREx–CREx)	54	0.01	−0.02
Blank ballots	4,564	0.87	−0.43
Total	523,265		
Valid votes	523,265	99.39	+0.16
Invalid votes	3,221	0.61	−0.16
Votes cast / turnout	526,486	51.07	−13.89
Abstentions	504,426	48.93	+13.89
Registered voters	1,030,912		
Sources
Footnotes: ^{1} Within the United We Can Change Europe and Commitment to Europe alliances in the 2019 election.; ^{2} Aragon Exists–The Forgotten Spain Exists–Municipalists–Fair World results are to the combined totals of For a Fairer World and Centrists for Europe in the 2019 election.; ^{3} Animalist Party with the Environment results are compared to Animalist Party Against Mistreatment of Animals totals in the 2019 election.; ^{4} Republics Now results are compared to Republics Now–Puyalón de Cuchas totals in the 2019 election.; ^{5} Spanish Phalanx of the CNSO results are compared to FE de las JONS–Spanish Alternative–La Falange–National Democracy totals in the 2019 election.; ^{6} Believe in Europe results are compared to With You, We Are Democracy totals in the 2019 election.; ^{7} Together and Free for Europe results are compared to Free for Europe totals in the 2019 election.; ^{8} PCPE–PCPC Coalition results are compared to Communists totals in the 2019 election.; ^{9} Andalusia Now results are compared to Andalusia by Herself totals in the 2019 election.

=== Asturias ===
← Summary of the 9 June 2024 European Parliament election results in Asturias
Parties and alliances	Popular vote		
Parties and alliances	Votes	%	±pp
People's Party (PP)	157,611	36.87	+17.86
Spanish Socialist Workers' Party (PSOE)	149,818	35.05	−3.53
Vox (Vox)	42,743	10.00	+2.55
Unite (Sumar)^{1}	25,386	5.94	n/a
We Can (Podemos)^{1}	16,263	3.80	n/a
The Party is Over (Se Acabó La Fiesta)	14,027	3.28	New
Citizens–Party of the Citizenry (Cs)	3,115	0.73	−12.85
Animalist Party with the Environment (PACMA)^{2}	2,721	0.64	−0.52
Workers' Front (FO)	2,023	0.47	New
Republics Now (ERC–EH Bildu–BNG–Ara Més)^{3}	1,674	0.39	+0.03
Spanish Left (IzqEsp)	1,610	0.38	New
Communist Party of the Workers of Spain (PCTE)	946	0.22	+0.01
Feminists to the Congress (PFAC)	798	0.19	New
Blank Seats to Leave Empty Seats (EB)	610	0.14	New
Justice Europe (IE)	529	0.12	New
The Forgotten Spain Exists–Municipalists–Fair World (Existe)^{4}	504	0.12	±0.00
Volt Spain (Volt)	470	0.11	−0.14
PCPE–PCPC Coalition (PCPE–PCPC)^{5}	390	0.09	−0.08
Spanish Phalanx of the CNSO (FE de las JONS)^{6}	258	0.06	+0.01
Believe in Europe (Cree en Europa)^{7}	252	0.06	+0.03
Spanish Food Sovereignty (SAE)	240	0.06	New
Pirates–Rebel Alliance–European Pirates (Pirates/Rebeldes)	226	0.05	−0.01
Zero Cuts (Recortes Cero)	225	0.05	−0.24
Humanist Party (PH)	171	0.04	0.00
Future (F)	161	0.04	New
Coalition for a Solidary Europe (CEUS)	153	0.04	−0.02
Workers' Revolutionary Current (CRT)	146	0.03	New
Country and Rural Movement (PMR)	121	0.03	New
Salamanca–Zamora–León PREPAL (PREPAL)	99	0.02	New
Galician Party (GLG)	91	0.02	New
Together and Free for Europe (Junts UE)^{8}	59	0.01	−0.10
Andalusia Now (Andalucistas)^{9}	36	0.01	0.00
Together for Extremadura (JUEX)	38	0.01	New
Extremadurans (PREx–CREx)	28	0.01	−0.01
Blank ballots	3,942	0.92	−0.50
Total	427,484		
Valid votes	427,484	99.29	+0.16
Invalid votes	3,069	0.71	−0.16
Votes cast / turnout	430,553	44.73	−9.37
Abstentions	532,003	55.27	+9.37
Registered voters	962,556		
Sources
Footnotes: ^{1} Within the United We Can Change Europe and Commitment to Europe alliances in the 2019 election.; ^{2} Animalist Party with the Environment results are compared to Animalist Party Against Mistreatment of Animals totals in the 2019 election.; ^{3} Republics Now results are compared to Andecha Astur–Republics Now totals in the 2019 election.; ^{4} The Forgotten Spain Exists–Municipalists–Fair World results are to the combined totals of For a Fairer World and Centrists for Europe in the 2019 election.; ^{5} PCPE–PCPC Coalition results are compared to Communists totals in the 2019 election.; ^{6} Spanish Phalanx of the CNSO results are compared to FE de las JONS–Spanish Alternative–La Falange–National Democracy totals in the 2019 election.; ^{7} Believe in Europe results are compared to With You, We Are Democracy totals in the 2019 election.; ^{8} Together and Free for Europe results are compared to Free for Europe totals in the 2019 election.; ^{9} Andalusia Now results are compared to Andalusia by Herself totals in the 2019 election.

=== Balearic Islands ===
← Summary of the 9 June 2024 European Parliament election results in the Balearic Islands
Parties and alliances	Popular vote		
Parties and alliances	Votes	%	±pp
People's Party (PP)	114,586	35.79	+14.61
Spanish Socialist Workers' Party (PSOE)	92,665	28.94	−0.40
Vox (Vox)	35,844	11.20	+3.54
The Party is Over (Se Acabó La Fiesta)	17,121	5.35	New
Now More–Republics Now (Ara Més–Ara Repúbliques)^{1}	16,494	5.15	−2.73
Unite (Sumar)^{2}	13,964	4.36	n/a
We Can (Podemos)^{2}	10,077	3.15	n/a
El Pi–Proposal for the Isles (Coalition for a Solidary Europe) (El Pi)	3,103	0.97	−2.86
Animalist Party with the Environment (PACMA)^{3}	2,946	0.92	−0.70
Together and Free for Europe (Junts UE)^{4}	2,349	0.73	−1.80
Citizens–Party of the Citizenry (Cs)	1,891	0.59	−11.23
Justice Europe (IE)	1,189	0.37	New
Workers' Front (FO)	1,166	0.36	New
Feminists to the Congress (PFAC)	758	0.24	New
Volt Spain (Volt)	485	0.15	−0.05
Spanish Left (IzqEsp)	438	0.14	New
Blank Seats to Leave Empty Seats (EB)	376	0.12	New
Pirates–Rebel Alliance–European Pirates (Pirates/Rebels)	277	0.09	±0.00
Communist Party of the Workers of Spain (PCTE)	269	0.08	±0.00
PCPE–PCPC Coalition (PCPE–PCPC)^{5}	241	0.08	−0.02
The Forgotten Spain Exists–Municipalists–Fair World (Existe)^{6}	205	0.06	−0.06
Believe in Europe (Cree en Europa)^{7}	198	0.06	−0.07
Spanish Phalanx of the CNSO (FE de las JONS)^{8}	153	0.05	±0.00
Humanist Party (PH)	153	0.05	−0.01
Country and Rural Movement (PMR)	148	0.05	New
Future (F)	127	0.04	New
Zero Cuts (Recortes Cero)	126	0.04	−0.19
Andalusia Now (Andalucistas)^{9}	119	0.04	−0.02
Spanish Food Sovereignty (SAE)	111	0.03	New
Galician Party (GLG)	101	0.03	New
Workers' Revolutionary Current (CRT)	90	0.03	New
Salamanca–Zamora–León PREPAL (PREPAL)	64	0.02	New
Together for Extremadura (JUEX)	61	0.02	New
Extremadurans (PREx–CREx)	41	0.01	−0.02
Blank ballots	2,239	0.70	−0.63
Total	320,175		
Valid votes	320,175	99.44	+0.51
Invalid votes	1,792	0.56	−0.51
Votes cast / turnout	321,967	37.71	−13.81
Abstentions	531,810	62.29	+13.81
Registered voters	853,777		
Sources
Footnotes: ^{1} Now More–Republics Now results are compared to the combined totals of Republican Left–Republics Now and More for Majorca (Commitment to Europe) in the 2019 election.; ^{2} Within the United We Can Change Europe alliance in the 2019 election.; ^{3} Animalist Party with the Environment results are compared to Animalist Party Against Mistreatment of Animals totals in the 2019 election.; ^{4} Together and Free for Europe results are compared to Free for Europe totals in the 2019 election.; ^{5} PCPE–PCPC Coalition results are compared to Communists totals in the 2019 election.; ^{6} The Forgotten Spain Exists–Municipalists–Fair World results are to the combined totals of For a Fairer World and Centrists for Europe in the 2019 election.; ^{7} Believe in Europe results are compared to With You, We Are Democracy totals in the 2019 election.; ^{8} Spanish Phalanx of the CNSO results are compared to FE de las JONS–Spanish Alternative–La Falange–National Democracy totals in the 2019 election.; ^{9} Andalusia Now results are compared to Andalusia by Herself totals in the 2019 election.

=== Basque Country ===
← Summary of the 9 June 2024 European Parliament election results in the Basque Country
Parties and alliances	Popular vote		
Parties and alliances	Votes	%	±pp
Basque Country Gather–Republics Now (EH Bildu–Orain Errepublikak)	229,581	26.26	+4.25
Socialist Party of the Basque Country–Basque Country Left (PSE–EE (PSOE))	227,710	26.05	+7.07
Basque Nationalist Party (Coalition for a Solidary Europe) (EAJ/PNV)	196,152	22.44	−11.48
People's Party (PP)	101,060	11.56	+5.12
Unite (Sumar)^{1}	28,806	3.30	n/a
We Can (Podemos)^{1}	28,083	3.21	n/a
Vox (Vox)	23,417	2.68	+1.46
The Party is Over (Se Acabó La Fiesta)	15,105	1.73	New
Animalist Party with the Environment (PACMA)^{2}	4,671	0.53	−0.30
Workers' Front (FO)	2,747	0.31	New
Justice Europe (IE)	1,816	0.21	New
Feminists to the Congress (PFAC)	1,675	0.19	New
Blank Seats to Leave Empty Seats (EB)	1,455	0.17	New
Citizens–Party of the Citizenry (Cs)	1,253	0.14	−2.58
Spanish Left (IzqEsp)	815	0.09	New
The Forgotten Spain Exists–Municipalists–Fair World (Existe)^{3}	699	0.08	−0.11
Communist Party of the Workers of Spain (PCTE/ELAK)	580	0.07	±0.00
PCPE–PCPC Coalition (PCPE–PCPC)^{4}	486	0.06	−0.05
Pirates–Rebel Alliance–European Pirates (Pirates/Rebeldes)	481	0.06	±0.00
Together and Free for Europe (Junts UE)^{5}	449	0.05	−0.40
Volt Spain (Volt)	402	0.05	−0.01
Zero Cuts (Recortes Cero)	344	0.04	−0.15
Humanist Party (PH)	245	0.03	±0.00
Believe in Europe (Cree en Europa)^{6}	222	0.03	−0.01
Spanish Food Sovereignty (SAE)	212	0.02	New
Workers' Revolutionary Current (CRT)	189	0.02	New
Future (F)	176	0.02	New
Country and Rural Movement (PMR)	155	0.02	New
Salamanca–Zamora–León PREPAL (PREPAL)	152	0.02	New
Spanish Phalanx of the CNSO (FE de las JONS)^{7}	129	0.01	−0.01
Galician Party (GLG)	123	0.01	New
Andalusia Now (Andalucistas)^{8}	112	0.01	±0.00
Together for Extremadura (JUEX)	109	0.01	New
Extremadurans (PREx–CREx)	88	0.01	−0.02
Blank ballots	4,528	0.52	−0.28
Total	874,227		
Valid votes	874,227	99.58	+0.15
Invalid votes	3,713	0.42	−0.15
Votes cast / turnout	877,940	48.82	−14.07
Abstentions	920,444	51.18	+14.07
Registered voters	1,798,384		
Sources
Footnotes: ^{1} Within the United We Can Change Europe and Commitment to Europe alliances in the 2019 election.; ^{2} Animalist Party with the Environment results are compared to Animalist Party Against Mistreatment of Animals totals in the 2019 election.; ^{3} The Forgotten Spain Exists–Municipalists–Fair World results are to the combined totals of Centrists for Europe and For a Fairer World in the 2019 election.; ^{4} PCPE–PCPC Coalition results are compared to Communists totals in the 2019 election.; ^{5} Together and Free for Europe results are compared to Free for Europe totals in the 2019 election.; ^{6} Believe in Europe results are compared to With You, We Are Democracy totals in the 2019 election.; ^{7} Spanish Phalanx of the CNSO results are compared to FE de las JONS–Spanish Alternative–La Falange–National Democracy totals in the 2019 election.; ^{8} Andalusia Now results are compared to Andalusia by Herself totals in the 2019 election.

=== Canary Islands ===
← Summary of the 9 June 2024 European Parliament election results in the Canary Islands
Parties and alliances	Popular vote		
Parties and alliances	Votes	%	±pp
Spanish Socialist Workers' Party (PSOE)	207,351	30.48	−1.53
People's Party (PP)	199,227	29.28	+13.45
Vox (Vox)	81,590	11.99	+8.68
Canarian Coalition (Coalition for a Solidary Europe) (CCa)	70,008	10.29	−10.50
The Party is Over (Se Acabó La Fiesta)	43,013	6.32	New
Unite Canaries (Sumar Canarias)^{1}	27,277	4.01	n/a
We Can (Podemos)^{1}	23,365	3.43	n/a
Animalist Party with the Environment (PACMA)^{2}	7,655	1.13	−0.53
Citizens–Party of the Citizenry (Cs)	2,835	0.42	−7.17
Workers' Front (FO)	2,108	0.31	New
Republics Now (ERC–EH Bildu–BNG–Ara Més)^{3}	1,790	0.26	−0.01
Justice Europe (IE)	1,243	0.18	New
Feminists to the Congress (PFAC)	1,142	0.17	New
Volt Spain (Volt)	1,032	0.15	+0.02
Spanish Left (IzqEsp)	959	0.14	New
Blank Seats to Leave Empty Seats (EB)	545	0.08	New
PCPE–PCPC Coalition (PCPE–PCPC)^{4}	514	0.08	−0.05
Zero Cuts (Recortes Cero)	415	0.06	−0.30
Communist Party of the Workers of Spain (PCTE)	409	0.06	±0.00
Pirates–Rebel Alliance–European Pirates (Pirates/Rebeldes)	398	0.06	±0.00
The Forgotten Spain Exists–Municipalists–Fair World (Existe)^{5}	350	0.05	−0.11
Together and Free for Europe (Junts UE)^{6}	338	0.05	−0.15
Humanist Party (PH)	317	0.05	±0.00
Believe in Europe (Cree en Europa)^{7}	310	0.05	−0.04
Spanish Phalanx of the CNSO (FE de las JONS)^{8}	237	0.03	−0.01
Future (F)	227	0.03	New
Spanish Food Sovereignty (SAE)	222	0.03	New
Workers' Revolutionary Current (CRT)	216	0.03	New
Galician Party (GLG)	204	0.03	New
Country and Rural Movement (PMR)	175	0.03	New
Andalusia Now (Andalucistas)^{9}	170	0.02	−0.01
Salamanca–Zamora–León PREPAL (PREPAL)	161	0.02	New
Together for Extremadura (JUEX)	111	0.02	New
Extremadurans (PREx–CREx)	73	0.01	−0.03
Blank ballots	4,405	0.65	−0.81
Total	680,392		
Valid votes	680,392	99.30	+0.26
Invalid votes	4,797	0.70	−0.26
Votes cast / turnout	685,189	37.20	−14.23
Abstentions	1,156,678	62.80	+14.23
Registered voters	1,841,867		
Sources
Footnotes: ^{1} Within the United We Can Change Europe and Commitment to Europe alliances in the 2019 election.; ^{2} Animalist Party with the Environment results are compared to Animalist Party Against Mistreatment of Animals totals in the 2019 election.; ^{3} Republics Now results are compared to Canaries Now–Republics Now totals in the 2019 election.; ^{4} PCPE–PCPC Coalition results are compared to Communists totals in the 2019 election.; ^{5} The Forgotten Spain Exists–Municipalists–Fair World results are to the combined totals of For a Fairer World and Centrists for Europe in the 2019 election.; ^{6} Together and Free for Europe results are compared to Free for Europe totals in the 2019 election.; ^{7} Believe in Europe results are compared to With You, We Are Democracy totals in the 2019 election.; ^{8} Spanish Phalanx of the CNSO results are compared to FE de las JONS–Spanish Alternative–La Falange–National Democracy totals in the 2019 election.; ^{9} Andalusia Now results are compared to Andalusia by Herself totals in the 2019 election.

=== Cantabria ===
← Summary of the 9 June 2024 European Parliament election results in Cantabria
Parties and alliances	Popular vote		
Parties and alliances	Votes	%	±pp
People's Party (PP)	110,237	42.77	+15.71
Spanish Socialist Workers' Party (PSOE)	79,984	31.03	−6.49
Vox (Vox)	25,473	9.88	+3.05
The Party is Over (Se Acabó La Fiesta)	14,651	5.68	New
Unite (Sumar)^{1}	8,127	3.15	n/a
We Can (Podemos)^{1}	7,018	2.72	n/a
Citizens–Party of the Citizenry (Cs)	2,262	0.88	−13.08
Animalist Party with the Environment (PACMA)^{2}	1,626	0.63	−0.73
Workers' Front (FO)	1,009	0.39	New
Republics Now (ERC–EH Bildu–BNG–Ara Més)	831	0.32	+0.12
Spanish Left (IzqEsp)	623	0.24	New
Justice Europe (IE)	492	0.19	New
Volt Spain (Volt)	400	0.16	+0.02
Communist Party of the Workers of Spain (PCTE)	348	0.14	−0.02
Feminists to the Congress (PFAC)	311	0.12	New
Blank Seats to Leave Empty Seats (EB)	279	0.11	New
Coalition for a Solidary Europe (CEUS)	268	0.10	−0.15
The Forgotten Spain Exists–Municipalists–Fair World (Existe)^{3}	202	0.08	−0.08
Spanish Food Sovereignty (SAE)	168	0.07	New
Pirates–Rebel Alliance–European Pirates (Pirates/Rebeldes)	155	0.06	−0.02
Spanish Phalanx of the CNSO (FE de las JONS)^{4}	154	0.06	±0.00
PCPE–PCPC Coalition (PCPE–PCPC)^{5}	148	0.06	−0.15
Believe in Europe (Cree en Europa)^{6}	132	0.05	−0.03
Humanist Party (PH)	114	0.04	−0.02
Zero Cuts (Recortes Cero)	110	0.04	−0.22
Future (F)	105	0.04	New
Workers' Revolutionary Current (CRT)	88	0.03	New
Galician Party (GLG)	57	0.02	New
Salamanca–Zamora–León PREPAL (PREPAL)	53	0.02	New
Together and Free for Europe (Junts UE)^{7}	38	0.01	−0.07
Country and Rural Movement (PMR)	37	0.01	New
Andalusia Now (Andalucistas)^{8}	36	0.01	−0.02
Together for Extremadura (JUEX)	33	0.01	New
Extremadurans (PREx–CREx)	28	0.01	−0.02
Blank ballots	2,171	0.84	−1.07
Total	257,768		
Valid votes	257,768	99.08	+0.37
Invalid votes	2,398	0.92	−0.37
Votes cast / turnout	260,166	50.65	−12.30
Abstentions	253,476	49.35	+12.30
Registered voters	513,642		
Sources
Footnotes: ^{1} Within the United We Can Change Europe and Commitment to Europe alliances in the 2019 election.; ^{2} Animalist Party with the Environment results are compared to Animalist Party Against Mistreatment of Animals totals in the 2019 election.; ^{3} The Forgotten Spain Exists–Municipalists–Fair World results are to the combined totals of For a Fairer World and Centrists for Europe in the 2019 election.; ^{4} Spanish Phalanx of the CNSO results are compared to FE de las JONS–Spanish Alternative–La Falange–National Democracy totals in the 2019 election.; ^{5} PCPE–PCPC Coalition results are compared to Communists totals in the 2019 election.; ^{6} Believe in Europe results are compared to With You, We Are Democracy totals in the 2019 election.; ^{7} Together and Free for Europe results are compared to Free for Europe totals in the 2019 election.; ^{8} Andalusia Now results are compared to Andalusia by Herself totals in the 2019 election.

=== Castile and León ===
← Summary of the 9 June 2024 European Parliament election results in Castile and León
Parties and alliances	Popular vote		
Parties and alliances	Votes	%	±pp
People's Party (PP)	474,222	44.46	+14.31
Spanish Socialist Workers' Party (PSOE)	324,780	30.45	−4.58
Vox (Vox)	112,497	10.55	+3.37
The Party is Over (Se Acabó La Fiesta)	42,957	4.03	New
Unite (Sumar)^{1}	31,208	2.93	n/a
We Can (Podemos)^{1}	25,381	2.38	n/a
Republics Now (ERC–EH Bildu–BNG–Ara Més)	2,211	0.21	+0.09
Citizens–Party of the Citizenry (Cs)	8,930	0.84	−14.22
The Forgotten Spain Exists–Municipalists–Fair World (Existe)^{2}	6,413	0.60	+0.41
Animalist Party with the Environment (PACMA)^{3}	4,956	0.46	−0.40
Workers' Front (FO)	4,371	0.41	New
Salamanca–Zamora–León PREPAL (PREPAL)	3,112	0.29	New
Spanish Left (IzqEsp)	2,797	0.26	New
Feminists to the Congress (PFAC)	1,447	0.14	New
Spanish Food Sovereignty (SAE)	1,334	0.13	New
Volt Spain (Volt)	1,241	0.12	−0.01
Justice Europe (IE)	1,230	0.12	New
Communist Party of the Workers of Spain (PCTE)	1,141	0.11	±0.00
Blank Seats to Leave Empty Seats (EB)	1,078	0.10	New
Spanish Phalanx of the CNSO (FE de las JONS)^{4}	897	0.08	+0.02
Believe in Europe (Cree en Europa)^{5}	645	0.06	±0.00
Pirates–Rebel Alliance–European Pirates (Pirates/Rebeldes)	605	0.06	−0.01
Future (F)	564	0.05	New
PCPE–PCPC Coalition (PCPE–PCPC)^{6}	503	0.05	−0.07
Coalition for a Solidary Europe (CEUS)	440	0.04	−0.05
Together and Free for Europe (Junts UE)^{7}	422	0.04	−0.02
Humanist Party (PH)	354	0.03	±0.00
Zero Cuts (Recortes Cero)	350	0.03	−0.16
Country and Rural Movement (PMR)	273	0.03	New
Galician Party (GLG)	245	0.02	New
Workers' Revolutionary Current (CRT)	242	0.02	New
Extremadurans (PREx–CREx)	140	0.01	−0.02
Andalusia Now (Andalucistas)^{8}	139	0.01	−0.01
Together for Extremadura (JUEX)	134	0.01	New
Blank ballots	9,284	0.87	−0.57
Total	1,066,543		
Valid votes	1,066,543	99.12	+0.16
Invalid votes	9,487	0.88	−0.16
Votes cast / turnout	1,076,030	51.51	−13.00
Abstentions	1,013,036	48.49	+13.00
Registered voters	2,089,066		
Sources
Footnotes: ^{1} Within the United We Can Change Europe and Commitment to Europe alliances in the 2019 election.; ^{2} The Forgotten Spain Exists–Municipalists–Fair World results are to the combined totals of For a Fairer World and Centrists for Europe in the 2019 election.; ^{3} Animalist Party with the Environment results are compared to Animalist Party Against Mistreatment of Animals totals in the 2019 election.; ^{4} Spanish Phalanx of the CNSO results are compared to FE de las JONS–Spanish Alternative–La Falange–National Democracy totals in the 2019 election.; ^{5} Believe in Europe results are compared to With You, We Are Democracy totals in the 2019 election.; ^{6} PCPE–PCPC Coalition results are compared to Communists totals in the 2019 election.; ^{7} Together and Free for Europe results are compared to Free for Europe totals in the 2019 election.; ^{8} Andalusia Now results are compared to Andalusia by Herself totals in the 2019 election.

=== Castilla–La Mancha ===
← Summary of the 9 June 2024 European Parliament election results in Castilla–La Mancha
Parties and alliances	Popular vote		
Parties and alliances	Votes	%	±pp
People's Party (PP)	332,256	41.46	+13.85
Spanish Socialist Workers' Party (PSOE)	254,071	31.70	−8.76
Vox (Vox)	103,940	12.97	+4.76
The Party is Over (Se Acabó La Fiesta)	39,685	4.95	New
Unite (Sumar)^{1}	24,323	3.04	n/a
We Can (Podemos)^{1}	17,673	2.21	n/a
Citizens–Party of the Citizenry (Cs)	4,703	0.59	−11.61
Animalist Party with the Environment (PACMA)^{2}	4,524	0.56	−0.47
Workers' Front (FO)	2,891	0.36	New
The Forgotten Spain Exists–Municipalists–Fair World (Existe)^{3}	1,383	0.17	−0.07
Spanish Left (IzqEsp)	1,116	0.14	New
Volt Spain (Volt)	932	0.12	−0.01
Republics Now (ERC–EH Bildu–BNG–Ara Més)	926	0.12	+0.05
Feminists to the Congress (PFAC)	845	0.11	New
Justice Europe (IE)	670	0.08	New
Spanish Phalanx of the CNSO (FE de las JONS)^{4}	628	0.08	+0.01
Blank Seats to Leave Empty Seats (EB)	575	0.07	New
Spanish Food Sovereignty (SAE)	553	0.07	New
Communist Party of the Workers of Spain (PCTE)	546	0.07	±0.00
PCPE–PCPC Coalition (PCPE–PCPC)^{5}	426	0.05	−0.05
Pirates–Rebel Alliance–European Pirates (Pirates/Rebeldes)	374	0.05	+0.01
Believe in Europe (Cree en Europa)^{6}	337	0.04	−0.01
Humanist Party (PH)	242	0.03	±0.00
Zero Cuts (Recortes Cero)	225	0.03	−0.18
Future (F)	221	0.03	New
Coalition for a Solidary Europe (CEUS)	212	0.03	−0.04
Workers' Revolutionary Current (CRT)	166	0.02	New
Andalusia Now (Andalucistas)^{7}	157	0.02	±0.00
Together for Extremadura (JUEX)	153	0.02	New
Country and Rural Movement (PMR)	132	0.02	New
Galician Party (GLG)	117	0.01	New
Salamanca–Zamora–León PREPAL (PREPAL)	103	0.01	New
Extremadurans (PREx–CREx)	101	0.01	−0.03
Together and Free for Europe (Junts UE)^{8}	87	0.01	−0.04
Blank ballots	6,110	0.76	−0.34
Total	801,403		
Valid votes	801,403	98.97	+0.11
Invalid votes	8,343	1.03	−0.11
Votes cast / turnout	809,746	50.34	−18.31
Abstentions	798,788	49.66	+18.31
Registered voters	1,608,534		
Sources
Footnotes: ^{1} Within the United We Can Change Europe and Commitment to Europe alliances in the 2019 election.; ^{2} Animalist Party with the Environment results are compared to Animalist Party Against Mistreatment of Animals totals in the 2019 election.; ^{3} The Forgotten Spain Exists–Municipalists–Fair World results are to the combined totals of Centrists for Europe and For a Fairer World in the 2019 election.; ^{4} Spanish Phalanx of the CNSO results are compared to FE de las JONS–Spanish Alternative–La Falange–National Democracy totals in the 2019 election.; ^{5} PCPE–PCPC Coalition results are compared to Communists totals in the 2019 election.; ^{6} Believe in Europe results are compared to With You, We Are Democracy totals in the 2019 election.; ^{7} Andalusia Now results are compared to Andalusia by Herself totals in the 2019 election.; ^{8} Together and Free for Europe results are compared to Free for Europe totals in the 2019 election.

=== Catalonia ===
← Summary of the 9 June 2024 European Parliament election results in Catalonia
Parties and alliances	Popular vote		
Parties and alliances	Votes	%	±pp
Socialists' Party of Catalonia (PSC–PSOE)	734,741	30.61	+8.55
Together and Free for Europe (Junts UE)^{1}	433,200	18.05	−10.58
Republican Left of Catalonia–Republics Now (ERC–Ara Repúbliques)	355,460	14.81	−6.40
People's Party (PP)	330,969	13.79	+8.63
Vox (Vox)	148,727	6.20	+4.21
We Can (Podemos)^{2}	110,721	4.61	n/a
Commons Unite (Comuns Sumar)^{2}	103,364	4.31	n/a
The Party is Over (Se Acabó La Fiesta)	67,337	2.81	New
Animalist Party with the Environment (PACMA)^{3}	31,469	1.31	−0.10
Citizens–Party of the Citizenry (Cs)	13,418	0.56	−8.06
Workers' Front (FO)	8,824	0.37	New
Pirates of Catalonia–European Pirates–Rebel Alliance (Pirates.cat/Rebels)	6,258	0.26	+0.12
Feminists to the Congress (PFAC)	5,768	0.24	New
Justice Europe (IE)	5,055	0.21	New
Blank Seats to Leave Empty Seats (EB)	3,103	0.13	New
Spanish Left (IzqEsp)	2,850	0.12	New
Volt Spain (Volt)	2,835	0.12	+0.04
Communist Party of the Workers of Catalonia (PCTC)	2,629	0.11	+0.03
PCPE–PCPC Coalition (PCPE–PCPC)^{4}	2,383	0.10	−0.04
Coalition for a Solidary Europe (CEUS)^{5}	2,230	0.09	−0.03
Country and Rural Movement (PMR)	2,221	0.09	New
The Forgotten Spain Exists–Municipalists–Fair World (Existe)^{6}	1,791	0.07	−0.07
Workers' Revolutionary Current (CRT)	1,230	0.05	New
Zero Cuts (Recortes Cero)	1,207	0.05	−0.15
Andalusia Now (Andalucistas)^{7}	1,102	0.05	+0.02
Together for Extremadura (JUEX)	955	0.04	New
Spanish Phalanx of the CNSO (FE de las JONS)^{8}	883	0.04	+0.01
Galician Party (GLG)	816	0.03	New
Humanist Party (PH)	748	0.03	±0.00
Believe in Europe (Cree en Europa)^{9}	737	0.03	±0.00
Spanish Food Sovereignty (SAE)	713	0.03	New
Salamanca–Zamora–León PREPAL (PREPAL)	556	0.02	New
Future (F)	512	0.02	New
Extremadurans (PREx–CREx)	274	0.01	−0.03
Blank ballots	15,239	0.63	+0.04
Total	2,400,325		
Valid votes	2,400,325	99.50	−0.14
Invalid votes	12,154	0.50	+0.14
Votes cast / turnout	2,412,479	41.54	−19.39
Abstentions	3,394,706	58.46	+19.39
Registered voters	5,807,185		
Sources
Footnotes: ^{1} Together and Free for Europe results are compared to Free for Europe totals in the 2019 election.; ^{2} Within the United We Can Change Europe and Commitment to Europe alliances in the 2019 election.; ^{3} Animalist Party with the Environment results are compared to Animalist Party Against Mistreatment of Animals totals in the 2019 election.; ^{4} PCPE–PCPC Coalition results are compared to Communists totals in the 2019 election.; ^{5} Coalition for a Solidary Europe results are compared to United to Advance (Coalition for a Solidary Europe) totals in the 2019 election.; ^{6} The Forgotten Spain Exists–Municipalists–Fair World results are to the combined totals of For a Fairer World and Centrists for Europe in the 2019 election.; ^{7} Andalusia Now results are compared to Andalusia by Herself totals in the 2019 election.; ^{8} Spanish Phalanx of the CNSO results are compared to FE de las JONS–Spanish Alternative–La Falange–National Democracy totals in the 2019 election.; ^{9} Believe in Europe results are compared to With You, We Are Democracy totals in the 2019 election.

=== Extremadura ===
← Summary of the 9 June 2024 European Parliament election results in Extremadura
Parties and alliances	Popular vote		
Parties and alliances	Votes	%	±pp
People's Party (PP)	170,835	41.40	+15.67
Spanish Socialist Workers' Party (PSOE)	150,959	36.58	−9.44
Vox (Vox)	41,098	9.96	+4.31
The Party is Over (Se Acabó La Fiesta)	14,232	3.45	New
Unite (Sumar)^{1}	10,324	2.50	n/a
We Can (Podemos)^{1}	9,247	2.24	n/a
Citizens–Party of the Citizenry (Cs)	2,170	0.53	−10.72
Together for Extremadura (JUEX)	1,923	0.47	New
Animalist Party with the Environment (PACMA)^{2}	1,641	0.40	−0.33
Extremadurans (PREx–CREx)	1,323	0.32	−0.32
Workers' Front (FO)	924	0.22	New
Spanish Left (IzqEsp)	533	0.13	New
The Forgotten Spain Exists–Municipalists–Fair World (Existe)^{3}	522	0.13	−0.08
Feminists to the Congress (PFAC)	496	0.12	New
Volt Spain (Volt)	494	0.12	−0.01
Republics Now (ERC–EH Bildu–BNG–Ara Més)	411	0.10	+0.04
Communist Party of the Workers of Spain (PCTE)	280	0.07	−0.02
Spanish Food Sovereignty (SAE)	273	0.07	New
Justice Europe (IE)	270	0.07	New
PCPE–PCPC Coalition (PCPE–PCPC)^{4}	231	0.06	−0.08
Spanish Phalanx of the CNSO (FE de las JONS)^{5}	204	0.05	+0.01
Together and Free for Europe (Junts UE)^{6}	180	0.04	−0.01
Blank Seats to Leave Empty Seats (EB)	178	0.04	New
Believe in Europe (Cree en Europa)^{7}	161	0.04	−0.03
Pirates–Rebel Alliance–European Pirates (Pirates/Rebeldes)	125	0.03	−0.02
Humanist Party (PH)	107	0.03	±0.00
Zero Cuts (Recortes Cero)	105	0.03	−0.11
Future (F)	83	0.02	New
Country and Rural Movement (PMR)	74	0.02	New
Workers' Revolutionary Current (CRT)	66	0.02	New
Salamanca–Zamora–León PREPAL (PREPAL)	63	0.02	New
Coalition for a Solidary Europe (CEUS)	61	0.01	−0.12
Andalusia Now (Andalucistas)^{8}	52	0.01	±0.00
Galician Party (GLG)	47	0.01	New
Blank ballots	2,995	0.73	−0.59
Total	412,687		
Valid votes	412,687	98.76	+0.26
Invalid votes	5,181	1.24	−0.26
Votes cast / turnout	417,868	46.91	−21.17
Abstentions	472,929	53.09	+21.17
Registered voters	890,797		
Sources
Footnotes: ^{1} Within the United We Can Change Europe and Commitment to Europe alliances in the 2019 election.; ^{2} Animalist Party with the Environment results are compared to Animalist Party Against Mistreatment of Animals totals in the 2019 election.; ^{3} The Forgotten Spain Exists–Municipalists–Fair World results are to the combined totals of For a Fairer World and Centrists for Europe in the 2019 election.; ^{4} PCPE–PCPC Coalition results are compared to Communists totals in the 2019 election.; ^{5} Spanish Phalanx of the CNSO results are compared to FE de las JONS–Spanish Alternative–La Falange–National Democracy totals in the 2019 election.; ^{6} Together and Free for Europe results are compared to Free for Europe totals in the 2019 election.; ^{7} Believe in Europe results are compared to With You, We Are Democracy totals in the 2019 election.; ^{8} Andalusia Now results are compared to Andalusia by Herself totals in the 2019 election.

=== Galicia ===
← Summary of the 9 June 2024 European Parliament election results in Galicia
Parties and alliances	Popular vote		
Parties and alliances	Votes	%	±pp
People's Party (PP)	491,369	43.63	+13.84
Socialists' Party of Galicia (PSdeG–PSOE)	303,689	26.96	−8.11
Galician Nationalist Bloc–Republics Now (BNG–Agora Repúblicas)	180,835	16.06	+4.26
Vox (Vox)	49,568	4.40	+1.80
Unite Galicia (Sumar Galicia)^{1}	23,563	2.09	n/a
The Party is Over (Se Acabó La Fiesta)	22,817	2.03	New
We Can (Podemos)^{1}	22,234	1.97	n/a
Animalist Party with the Environment (PACMA)^{2}	5,486	0.49	−0.75
Citizens–Party of the Citizenry (Cs)	2,962	0.26	−6.42
Workers' Front (FO)	2,903	0.26	New
Galician Party (GLG)	2,179	0.19	New
Feminists to the Congress (PFAC)	1,405	0.12	New
Spanish Left (IzqEsp)	1,060	0.09	New
Justice Europe (IE)	1,008	0.09	New
Blank Seats to Leave Empty Seats (EB)	889	0.08	New
Volt Spain (Volt)	714	0.06	−0.05
Spanish Food Sovereignty (SAE)	615	0.05	New
Pirates–Rebel Alliance–European Pirates (Pirates/Rebeldes)	593	0.05	−0.04
PCPE–PCPC Coalition (PCPE–PCPC)^{3}	582	0.05	−0.09
Communist Party of the Workers of Spain (PCTE)	516	0.05	−0.04
The Forgotten Spain Exists–Municipalists–Fair World (Existe)^{4}	440	0.04	−0.10
Coalition for a Solidary Europe (CEUS)^{5}	395	0.04	−0.41
Spanish Phalanx of the CNSO (FE de las JONS)^{6}	356	0.03	−0.01
Zero Cuts (Recortes Cero)	347	0.03	−0.24
Believe in Europe (Cree en Europa)^{7}	324	0.03	−0.01
Together and Free for Europe (Junts UE)^{8}	322	0.03	−0.11
Humanist Party (PH)	266	0.02	−0.03
Country and Rural Movement (PMR)	217	0.02	New
Future (F)	195	0.02	New
Workers' Revolutionary Current (CRT)	186	0.02	New
Salamanca–Zamora–León PREPAL (PREPAL)	154	0.01	New
Together for Extremadura (JUEX)	107	0.01	New
Andalusia Now (Andalucistas)^{9}	100	0.01	−0.02
Extremadurans (PREx–CREx)	76	0.01	−0.01
Blank ballots	7,830	0.70	−0.53
Total	1,126,302		
Valid votes	1,126,302	99.30	+0.43
Invalid votes	7,929	0.70	−0.43
Votes cast / turnout	1,134,231	42.02	−12.52
Abstentions	1,565,232	57.98	+12.52
Registered voters	2,699,463		
Sources
Footnotes: ^{1} Within the United We Can Change Europe and Commitment to Europe alliances in the 2019 election.; ^{2} Animalist Party with the Environment results are compared to Animalist Party Against Mistreatment of Animals totals in the 2019 election.; ^{3} PCPE–PCPC Coalition results are compared to Communists totals in the 2019 election.; ^{4} The Forgotten Spain Exists–Municipalists–Fair World results are to the combined totals of For a Fairer World and Centrists for Europe in the 2019 election.; ^{5} Coalition for a Solidary Europe results are compared to Commitment to Galicia (Coalition for a Solidary Europe) totals in the 2019 election.; ^{6} Spanish Phalanx of the CNSO results are compared to FE de las JONS–Spanish Alternative–La Falange–National Democracy totals in the 2019 election.; ^{7} Believe in Europe results are compared to With You, We Are Democracy totals in the 2019 election.; ^{8} Together and Free for Europe results are compared to Free for Europe totals in the 2019 election.; ^{9} Andalusia Now results are compared to Andalusia by Herself totals in the 2019 election.

=== La Rioja ===
← Summary of the 9 June 2024 European Parliament election results in La Rioja
Parties and alliances	Popular vote		
Parties and alliances	Votes	%	±pp
People's Party (PP)	55,345	44.61	+13.51
Spanish Socialist Workers' Party (PSOE)	40,420	32.58	−4.79
Vox (Vox)	10,968	8.84	+3.62
The Party is Over (Se Acabó La Fiesta)	4,546	3.66	New
Unite (Sumar)^{1}	4,044	3.26	n/a
We Can (Podemos)^{1}	2,918	2.35	n/a
Citizens–Party of the Citizenry (Cs)	783	0.63	−12.62
Animalist Party with the Environment (PACMA)^{2}	642	0.52	−0.32
Workers' Front (FO)	503	0.41	New
Republics Now (ERC–EH Bildu–BNG–Ara Més)	458	0.37	+0.17
Spanish Left (IzqEsp)	303	0.24	New
Blank Seats to Leave Empty Seats (EB)	261	0.21	New
The Forgotten Spain Exists–Municipalists–Fair World (Existe)^{3}	233	0.19	+0.05
Feminists to the Congress (PFAC)	209	0.17	New
Justice Europe (IE)	171	0.14	New
Spanish Food Sovereignty (SAE)	159	0.13	New
Volt Spain (Volt)	143	0.12	−0.04
Communist Party of the Workers of Spain (PCTE)	140	0.11	±0.00
Coalition for a Solidary Europe (CEUS)	105	0.08	−0.04
Pirates–Rebel Alliance–European Pirates (Pirates/Rebeldes)	96	0.08	−0.01
Spanish Phalanx of the CNSO (FE de las JONS)^{4}	76	0.06	+0.01
PCPE–PCPC Coalition (PCPE–PCPC)^{5}	71	0.06	−0.10
Believe in Europe (Cree en Europa)^{6}	68	0.05	+0.03
Humanist Party (PH)	62	0.05	+0.02
Zero Cuts (Recortes Cero)	51	0.04	−0.17
Future (F)	41	0.03	New
Salamanca–Zamora–León PREPAL (PREPAL)	40	0.03	New
Workers' Revolutionary Current (CRT)	40	0.03	New
Country and Rural Movement (PMR)	34	0.03	New
Galician Party (GLG)	27	0.02	New
Andalusia Now (Andalucistas)^{7}	25	0.02	+0.01
Together and Free for Europe (Junts UE)^{8}	23	0.02	−0.09
Together for Extremadura (JUEX)	20	0.02	New
Extremadurans (PREx–CREx)	8	0.01	−0.06
Blank ballots	1,034	0.83	−0.52
Total	124,067		
Valid votes	124,067	99.11	+0.07
Invalid votes	1,111	0.89	−0.07
Votes cast / turnout	125,178	49.12	−15.51
Abstentions	129,662	50.88	+15.51
Registered voters	254,840		
Sources
Footnotes: ^{1} Within the United We Can Change Europe and Commitment to Europe alliances in the 2019 election.; ^{2} Animalist Party with the Environment results are compared to Animalist Party Against Mistreatment of Animals totals in the 2019 election.; ^{3} The Forgotten Spain Exists–Municipalists–Fair World results are to the combined totals of For a Fairer World and Centrists for Europe in the 2019 election.; ^{4} Spanish Phalanx of the CNSO results are compared to FE de las JONS–Spanish Alternative–La Falange–National Democracy totals in the 2019 election.; ^{5} PCPE–PCPC Coalition results are compared to Communists totals in the 2019 election.; ^{6} Believe in Europe results are compared to With You, We Are Democracy totals in the 2019 election.; ^{7} Andalusia Now results are compared to Andalusia by Herself totals in the 2019 election.; ^{8} Together and Free for Europe results are compared to Free for Europe totals in the 2019 election.

=== Madrid ===
← Summary of the 9 June 2024 European Parliament election results in Madrid
Parties and alliances	Popular vote		
Parties and alliances	Votes	%	±pp
People's Party (PP)	1,142,691	40.74	+18.59
Spanish Socialist Workers' Party (PSOE)	789,993	28.17	−4.13
Vox (Vox)	300,803	10.73	+0.84
Unite (Sumar)^{1}	163,250	5.82	n/a
The Party is Over (Se Acabó La Fiesta)	141,801	5.06	New
We Can (Podemos)^{1}	125,786	4.48	n/a
Citizens–Party of the Citizenry (Cs)	31,086	1.11	−17.14
Animalist Party with the Environment (PACMA)^{2}	20,285	0.72	−0.84
Workers' Front (FO)	13,588	0.48	New
Spanish Left (IzqEsp)	8,447	0.30	New
Republics Now (ERC–EH Bildu–BNG–Ara Més)	7,563	0.27	+0.10
Feminists to the Congress (PFAC)	4,809	0.17	New
The Forgotten Spain Exists–Municipalists–Fair World (Existe)^{3}	4,171	0.15	−0.06
Justice Europe (IE)	3,505	0.12	New
Volt Spain (Volt)	3,474	0.12	−0.09
Blank Seats to Leave Empty Seats (EB)	3,058	0.11	New
Communist Party of the Workers of Spain (PCTE)	2,421	0.09	±0.00
Believe in Europe (Cree en Europa)^{4}	2,357	0.08	+0.05
Spanish Phalanx of the CNSO (FE de las JONS)^{5}	2,280	0.08	−0.01
Pirates–Rebel Alliance–European Pirates (Pirates/Rebeldes)	1,767	0.06	−0.01
Coalition for a Solidary Europe (CEUS)	1,553	0.06	−0.02
Humanist Party (PH)	1,343	0.05	+0.01
Together and Free for Europe (Junts UE)^{6}	1,176	0.04	−0.05
Together for Extremadura (JUEX)	1,117	0.04	New
Future (F)	1,048	0.04	New
Salamanca–Zamora–León PREPAL (PREPAL)	997	0.04	New
PCPE–PCPC Coalition (PCPE–PCPC)^{8}	988	0.04	−0.05
Zero Cuts (Recortes Cero)	906	0.03	−0.17
Workers' Revolutionary Current (CRT)	861	0.03	New
Spanish Food Sovereignty (SAE)	800	0.03	New
Andalusia Now (Andalucistas)^{7}	798	0.03	+0.01
Extremadurans (PREx–CREx)	703	0.03	−0.04
Galician Party (GLG)	699	0.02	New
Country and Rural Movement (PMR)	494	0.02	New
Blank ballots	18,042	0.64	+0.07
Total	2,804,660		
Valid votes	2,804,660	99.46	−0.12
Invalid votes	15,193	0.54	+0.12
Votes cast / turnout	2,819,853	52.54	−11.04
Abstentions	2,547,370	47.46	+11.04
Registered voters	5,367,223		
Sources
Footnotes: ^{1} Within the United We Can Change Europe and Commitment to Europe alliances in the 2019 election.; ^{2} Animalist Party with the Environment results are compared to Animalist Party Against Mistreatment of Animals totals in the 2019 election.; ^{3} The Forgotten Spain Exists–Municipalists–Fair World results are to the combined totals of For a Fairer World and Centrists for Europe in the 2019 election.; ^{4} Believe in Europe results are compared to With You, We Are Democracy totals in the 2019 election.; ^{5} Spanish Phalanx of the CNSO results are compared to FE de las JONS–Spanish Alternative–La Falange–National Democracy totals in the 2019 election.; ^{6} Together and Free for Europe results are compared to Free for Europe totals in the 2019 election.; ^{7} Andalusia Now results are compared to Andalusia by Herself totals in the 2019 election.; ^{8} PCPE–PCPC Coalition results are compared to Communists totals in the 2019 election.

=== Murcia ===
← Summary of the 9 June 2024 European Parliament election results in Murcia
Parties and alliances	Popular vote		
Parties and alliances	Votes	%	±pp
People's Party (PP)	222,744	42.86	+12.33
Spanish Socialist Workers' Party (PSOE)	130,447	25.10	−6.85
Vox (Vox)	82,384	15.85	+4.73
The Party is Over (Se Acabó La Fiesta)	34,153	6.57	New
Unite (Sumar)^{1}	17,082	3.29	n/a
We Can (Podemos)^{1}	12,331	2.37	n/a
Citizens–Party of the Citizenry (Cs)	3,927	0.76	−13.28
Animalist Party with the Environment (PACMA)^{2}	3,568	0.69	−0.72
Workers' Front (FO)	1,922	0.37	New
Volt Spain (Volt)	1,143	0.22	+0.01
Spanish Left (IzqEsp)	856	0.16	New
The Forgotten Spain Exists–Municipalists–Fair World (Existe)^{3}	770	0.15	−0.02
Feminists to the Congress (PFAC)	570	0.11	New
Justice Europe (IE)	558	0.11	New
Republics Now (ERC–EH Bildu–BNG–Ara Més)	519	0.10	+0.02
Blank Seats to Leave Empty Seats (EB)	468	0.09	New
Spanish Phalanx of the CNSO (FE de las JONS)^{4}	321	0.06	±0.00
Zero Cuts (Recortes Cero)	309	0.06	−0.17
Communist Party of the Workers of Spain (PCTE)	279	0.05	−0.02
Pirates–Rebel Alliance–European Pirates (Pirates/Rebeldes)	273	0.05	−0.01
Spanish Food Sovereignty (SAE)	241	0.05	New
Believe in Europe (Cree en Europa)^{5}	240	0.05	−0.03
PCPE–PCPC Coalition (PCPE–PCPC)^{6}	234	0.05	−0.07
Future (F)	232	0.04	New
Humanist Party (PH)	217	0.04	±0.00
Coalition for a Solidary Europe (CEUS)	155	0.03	−0.07
Workers' Revolutionary Current (CRT)	153	0.03	New
Together and Free for Europe (Junts UE)^{7}	149	0.03	−0.03
Galician Party (GLG)	104	0.02	New
Country and Rural Movement (PMR)	98	0.02	New
Andalusia Now (Andalucistas)^{8}	81	0.02	±0.00
Salamanca–Zamora–León PREPAL (PREPAL)	64	0.01	New
Together for Extremadura (JUEX)	54	0.01	New
Extremadurans (PREx–CREx)	47	0.01	−0.03
Blank ballots	3,063	0.59	−0.24
Total	519,756		
Valid votes	519,756	99.38	+0.23
Invalid votes	3,249	0.62	−0.23
Votes cast / turnout	523,005	46.79	−13.99
Abstentions	594,750	53.21	+13.99
Registered voters	1,117,755		
Sources
Footnotes: ^{1} Within the United We Can Change Europe and Commitment to Europe alliances in the 2019 election.; ^{2} Animalist Party with the Environment results are compared to Animalist Party Against Mistreatment of Animals totals in the 2019 election.; ^{3} The Forgotten Spain Exists–Municipalists–Fair World results are to the combined totals of Centrists for Europe and For a Fairer World in the 2019 election.; ^{4} Spanish Phalanx of the CNSO results are compared to FE de las JONS–Spanish Alternative–La Falange–National Democracy totals in the 2019 election.; ^{5} Believe in Europe results are compared to With You, We Are Democracy totals in the 2019 election.; ^{6} PCPE–PCPC Coalition results are compared to Communists totals in the 2019 election.; ^{7} Together and Free for Europe results are compared to Free for Europe totals in the 2019 election.; ^{8} Andalusia Now results are compared to Andalusia by Herself totals in the 2019 election.

=== Navarre ===
← Summary of the 9 June 2024 European Parliament election results in Navarre
Parties and alliances	Popular vote		
Parties and alliances	Votes	%	±pp
Spanish Socialist Workers' Party (PSOE)	75,329	28.84	+0.88
People's Party (PP)	73,261	28.04	+9.29
Basque Country Gather–Republics Now (EH Bildu–Orain Errepublikak)	48,891	18.71	+2.72
Vox (Vox)	17,443	6.68	+2.46
Unite (Sumar)^{1}	10,065	3.85	n/a
We Can (Podemos)^{1}	8,464	3.24	n/a
Yes to the Future (Coalition for a Solidary Europe) (GBai)	8,272	3.17	−4.82
The Party is Over (Se Acabó La Fiesta)	7,997	3.06	New
Animalist Party with the Environment (PACMA)^{2}	1,458	0.56	−0.48
Citizens–Party of the Citizenry (Cs)	1,338	0.51	−6.90
Workers' Front (FO)	1,261	0.48	New
Feminists to the Congress (PFAC)	752	0.29	New
Justice Europe (IE)	716	0.27	New
The Forgotten Spain Exists–Municipalists–Fair World (Existe)^{3}	619	0.24	−0.05
Spanish Left (IzqEsp)	560	0.21	New
Blank Seats to Leave Empty Seats (EB)	461	0.18	New
Pirates–Rebel Alliance–European Pirates (Pirates/Rebeldes)	232	0.09	±0.00
Spanish Food Sovereignty (SAE)	210	0.08	New
Communist Party of the Workers of Spain (PCTE)	203	0.08	−0.03
Believe in Europe (Cree en Europa)^{4}	200	0.08	−0.02
Volt Spain (Volt)	185	0.07	−0.05
PCPE–PCPC Coalition (PCPE–PCPC)^{5}	176	0.07	−0.07
Humanist Party (PH)	142	0.05	±0.00
Zero Cuts (Recortes Cero)	129	0.05	−0.27
Together and Free for Europe (Junts UE)^{6}	117	0.04	−0.35
Future (F)	115	0.04	New
Workers' Revolutionary Current (CRT)	85	0.03	New
Spanish Phalanx of the CNSO (FE de las JONS)^{7}	76	0.03	−0.01
Country and Rural Movement (PMR)	71	0.03	New
Andalusia Now (Andalucistas)^{8}	63	0.02	−0.01
Galician Party (GLG)	58	0.02	New
Salamanca–Zamora–León PREPAL (PREPAL)	47	0.02	New
Together for Extremadura (JUEX)	35	0.01	New
Extremadurans (PREx–CREx)	28	0.01	−0.02
Blank ballots	2,181	0.83	−0.90
Total	261,240		
Valid votes	261,240	99.37	+0.11
Invalid votes	1,664	0.63	−0.11
Votes cast / turnout	262,904	50.04	−16.81
Abstentions	262,516	49.96	+16.81
Registered voters	525,420		
Sources
Footnotes: ^{1} Within the United We Can Change Europe and Commitment to Europe alliances in the 2019 election.; ^{2} Animalist Party with the Environment results are compared to Animalist Party Against Mistreatment of Animals totals in the 2019 election.; ^{3} The Forgotten Spain Exists–Municipalists–Fair World results are to the combined totals of For a Fairer World and Centrists for Europe in the 2019 election.; ^{4} Believe in Europe results are compared to With You, We Are Democracy totals in the 2019 election.; ^{5} PCPE–PCPC Coalition results are compared to Communists totals in the 2019 election.; ^{6} Together and Free for Europe results are compared to Free for Europe totals in the 2019 election.; ^{7} Spanish Phalanx of the CNSO results are compared to FE de las JONS–Spanish Alternative–La Falange–National Democracy totals in the 2019 election.; ^{8} Andalusia Now results are compared to Andalusia by Herself totals in the 2019 election.

=== Valencian Community ===
← Summary of the 9 June 2024 European Parliament election results in the Valencian Community
Parties and alliances	Popular vote		
Parties and alliances	Votes	%	±pp
People's Party (PP)	706,710	35.85	+13.27
Spanish Socialist Workers' Party (PSOE)	620,114	31.46	−1.51
Vox (Vox)	226,868	11.51	+4.28
Commitment–Unite (Compromís–Sumar)^{1}	151,015	7.66	n/a
The Party is Over (Se Acabó La Fiesta)	113,791	5.77	New
We Can (Podemos)^{1}	59,586	3.02	n/a
Animalist Party with the Environment (PACMA)^{2}	15,622	0.79	−0.69
Citizens–Party of the Citizenry (Cs)	14,938	0.76	−13.50
Republican Left–Republics Now (ERPV–Ara Repúbliques)	8,500	0.43	−0.11
Workers' Front (FO)	7,983	0.40	New
Feminists to the Congress (PFAC)	3,699	0.19	New
The Forgotten Spain Exists–Municipalists–Fair World (Existe)^{3}	3,069	0.16	+0.05
Justice Europe (IE)	3,001	0.15	New
Volt Spain (Volt)	2,686	0.14	±0.00
Spanish Left (IzqEsp)	2,652	0.13	New
Blank Seats to Leave Empty Seats (EB)	2,075	0.11	New
Together and Free for Europe (Junts UE)^{4}	2,008	0.10	−0.20
PCPE–PCPC Coalition (PCPE–PCPC)^{5}	1,484	0.08	−0.03
Country and Rural–Valencian Republic–Mediterranean Way (PMR–RV–VM)	1,360	0.07	New
Communist Party of the Workers of Spain (PCTE)	1,179	0.06	+0.01
Believe in Europe (Cree en Europa)^{6}	1,173	0.06	−0.09
Spanish Food Sovereignty (SAE)	1,148	0.06	New
Zero Cuts (Recortes Cero)	1,124	0.06	−0.19
Spanish Phalanx of the CNSO (FE de las JONS)^{7}	1,064	0.05	+0.01
Pirates–Rebel Alliance–European Pirates (Pirates/Rebeldes)	996	0.05	±0.00
Coalition for a Solidary Europe (CEUS)^{8}	806	0.04	−0.05
Humanist Party (PH)	774	0.04	+0.01
Future (F)	689	0.03	New
Workers' Revolutionary Current (CRT)	443	0.02	New
Andalusia Now (Andalucistas)^{9}	442	0.02	±0.00
Galician Party (GLG)	383	0.02	New
Salamanca–Zamora–León PREPAL (PREPAL)	333	0.02	New
Together for Extremadura (JUEX)	270	0.01	New
Extremadurans (PREx–CREx)	196	0.01	−0.02
Blank ballots	13,240	0.67	−0.11
Total	1,971,421		
Valid votes	1,971,421	99.31	+0.07
Invalid votes	13,662	0.69	−0.07
Votes cast / turnout	1,985,083	52.04	−10.46
Abstentions	1,829,272	47.96	+10.46
Registered voters	3,814,355		
Sources
Footnotes: ^{1} Within the United We Can Change Europe and Commitment to Europe alliances in the 2019 election.; ^{2} Animalist Party with the Environment results are compared to Animalist Party Against Mistreatment of Animals totals in the 2019 election.; ^{3} The Forgotten Spain Exists–Municipalists–Fair World results are to the combined totals of For a Fairer World and Centrists for Europe in the 2019 election.; ^{4} Together and Free for Europe results are compared to Free for Europe totals in the 2019 election.; ^{5} PCPE–PCPC Coalition results are compared to Communists totals in the 2019 election.; ^{6} Believe in Europe results are compared to With You, We Are Democracy totals in the 2019 election.; ^{7} Spanish Phalanx of the CNSO results are compared to FE de las JONS–Spanish Alternative–La Falange–National Democracy totals in the 2019 election.; ^{9} Coalition for a Solidary Europe results are compared to Valencian Democrats (Coalition for a Solidary Europe) totals in the 2019 election.; ^{9} Andalusia Now results are compared to Andalusia by Herself totals in the 2019 election.

== Autonomous cities ==
=== Ceuta ===
← Summary of the 9 June 2024 European Parliament election results in Ceuta
Parties and alliances	Popular vote		
Parties and alliances	Votes	%	±pp
People's Party (PP)	7,224	36.53	+9.29
Spanish Socialist Workers' Party (PSOE)	6,375	32.24	−1.34
Vox (Vox)	3,309	16.73	−3.85
The Party is Over (Se Acabó La Fiesta)	1,544	7.81	New
We Can (Podemos)^{1}	400	2.02	n/a
Unite (Sumar)^{1}	312	1.58	n/a
Citizens–Party of the Citizenry (Cs)	99	0.50	−7.21
Animalist Party with the Environment (PACMA)^{2}	86	0.43	−0.52
Country and Rural Movement (PMR)	45	0.23	New
Workers' Front (FO)	42	0.21	New
Volt Spain (Volt)	29	0.15	−0.01
Spanish Left (IzqEsp)	23	0.12	New
Republics Now (ERC–EH Bildu–BNG–Ara Més)	21	0.11	+0.03
Future (F)	21	0.11	New
PCPE–PCPC Coalition (PCPE–PCPC)^{3}	20	0.10	+0.01
Andalusia Now (Andalucistas)^{4}	17	0.09	+0.05
Believe in Europe (Cree en Europa)^{5}	16	0.08	+0.06
Blank Seats to Leave Empty Seats (EB)	11	0.06	New
Feminists to the Congress (PFAC)	10	0.05	New
Communist Party of the Workers of Spain (PCTE)	10	0.05	+0.01
Justice Europe (IE)	9	0.05	New
Pirates–Rebel Alliance–European Pirates (Pirates/Rebeldes)	9	0.05	+0.01
Spanish Food Sovereignty (SAE)	8	0.04	New
The Forgotten Spain Exists–Municipalists–Fair World (Existe)^{6}	6	0.03	−0.15
Spanish Phalanx of the CNSO (FE de las JONS)^{7}	5	0.03	+0.01
Galician Party (GLG)	5	0.03	New
Together and Free for Europe (Junts UE)^{8}	4	0.02	−0.03
Coalition for a Solidary Europe (CEUS)	4	0.02	−0.28
Humanist Party (PH)	4	0.02	−0.01
Extremadurans (PREx–CREx)	4	0.02	±0.00
Zero Cuts (Recortes Cero)	3	0.02	−0.13
Workers' Revolutionary Current (CRT)	3	0.02	New
Salamanca–Zamora–León PREPAL (PREPAL)	2	0.01	New
Together for Extremadura (JUEX)	2	0.01	New
Blank ballots	92	0.47	−0.30
Total	19,774		
Valid votes	19,774	99.59	+0.55
Invalid votes	81	0.41	−0.55
Votes cast / turnout	19,855	31.08	−21.89
Abstentions	44,027	68.92	+21.89
Registered voters	63,882		
Sources
Footnotes: ^{1} Within the United We Can Change Europe and Commitment to Europe alliances in the 2019 election.; ^{2} Animalist Party with the Environment results are compared to Animalist Party Against Mistreatment of Animals totals in the 2019 election.; ^{3} PCPE–PCPC Coalition results are compared to Communists totals in the 2019 election.; ^{4} Andalusia Now results are compared to Andalusia by Herself totals in the 2019 election.; ^{5} Believe in Europe results are compared to With You, We Are Democracy totals in the 2019 election.; ^{6} The Forgotten Spain Exists–Municipalists–Fair World results are to the combined totals of For a Fairer World and Centrists for Europe in the 2019 election.; ^{7} Spanish Phalanx of the CNSO results are compared to FE de las JONS–Spanish Alternative–La Falange–National Democracy totals in the 2019 election.; ^{8} Together and Free for Europe results are compared to Free for Europe totals in the 2019 election.

=== Melilla ===
← Summary of the 9 June 2024 European Parliament election results in Melilla
Parties and alliances	Popular vote		
Parties and alliances	Votes	%	±pp
People's Party (PP)	7,432	40.04	+9.42
Spanish Socialist Workers' Party (PSOE)	6,259	33.72	+10.40
Vox (Vox)	2,615	14.09	+3.59
The Party is Over (Se Acabó La Fiesta)	1,088	5.86	New
Unite (Sumar)^{1}	321	1.73	n/a
We Can (Podemos)^{1}	306	1.65	n/a
Citizens–Party of the Citizenry (Cs)	116	0.63	−7.74
Animalist Party with the Environment (PACMA)^{2}	88	0.47	−0.56
Workers' Front (FO)	56	0.30	New
Republics Now (ERC–EH Bildu–BNG–Ara Més)	19	0.10	+0.06
Spanish Left (IzqEsp)	14	0.08	New
Feminists to the Congress (PFAC)	14	0.08	New
Justice Europe (IE)	13	0.07	New
Communist Party of the Workers of Spain (PCTE)	11	0.06	+0.02
Spanish Phalanx of the CNSO (FE de las JONS)^{3}	10	0.05	±0.00
Spanish Food Sovereignty (SAE)	10	0.05	New
The Forgotten Spain Exists–Municipalists–Fair World (Existe)^{4}	9	0.05	−0.32
Workers' Revolutionary Current (CRT)	9	0.05	New
Volt Spain (Volt)	8	0.04	−0.04
Andalusia Now (Andalucistas)^{5}	7	0.04	+0.02
Pirates–Rebel Alliance–European Pirates (Pirates/Rebeldes)	7	0.04	−0.01
Future (F)	7	0.04	New
Humanist Party (PH)	6	0.03	±0.00
Zero Cuts (Recortes Cero)	5	0.03	−1.00
Salamanca–Zamora–León PREPAL (PREPAL)	5	0.03	New
PCPE–PCPC Coalition (PCPE–PCPC)^{6}	4	0.02	−0.06
Together and Free for Europe (Junts UE)^{7}	3	0.02	−0.07
Coalition for a Solidary Europe (CEUS)	3	0.02	−0.02
Blank Seats to Leave Empty Seats (EB)	3	0.02	New
Believe in Europe (Cree en Europa)^{8}	3	0.02	−0.01
Country and Rural Movement (PMR)	1	0.01	New
Galician Party (GLG)	1	0.01	New
Together for Extremadura (JUEX)	0	0.00	New
Extremadurans (PREx–CREx)	0	0.00	−0.64
Blank ballots	107	0.58	−0.09
Total	18,560		
Valid votes	18,560	99.58	+0.69
Invalid votes	79	0.42	−0.69
Votes cast / turnout	18,639	30.14	−24.67
Abstentions	43,197	69.86	+24.67
Registered voters	61,836		
Sources
Footnotes: ^{1} Within the United We Can Change Europe and Commitment to Europe alliances in the 2019 election.; ^{2} Animalist Party with the Environment results are compared to Animalist Party Against Mistreatment of Animals totals in the 2019 election.; ^{3} Spanish Phalanx of the CNSO results are compared to FE de las JONS–Spanish Alternative–La Falange–National Democracy totals in the 2019 election.; ^{4} The Forgotten Spain Exists–Municipalists–Fair World results are to the combined totals of Centrists for Europe and For a Fairer World in the 2019 election.; ^{5} Andalusia Now results are compared to Andalusia by Herself totals in the 2019 election.; ^{6} PCPE–PCPC Coalition results are compared to Communists totals in the 2019 election.; ^{7} Together and Free for Europe results are compared to Free for Europe totals in the 2019 election.; ^{8} Believe in Europe results are compared to With You, We Are Democracy totals in the 2019 election.

== Congress of Deputies projection ==
A projection of European Parliament election results using electoral rules for the Congress of Deputies would have given the following seat allocation, as distributed per constituencies and regions: (Note: Note that results are compared with party totals in the preceding general election—held in July 2023—for consistency.)

Summary of the 9 June 2024 Congress of Deputies projected election results
Parties and alliances	Popular vote			Seats	
Parties and alliances	Votes	%	±pp	Total	+/−
People's Party (PP)	5,996,627	34.21	+1.15	152	+15
Spanish Socialist Workers' Party (PSOE)	5,290,945	30.19	−1.49	131	+10
Vox (Vox)	1,688,255	9.63	−2.75	22	−11
Unite (Sumar)	818,015	4.67	−7.66	4	−27
The Party is Over (Se Acabó La Fiesta)	803,545	4.58	New	5	+5
We Can (Podemos)	578,007	3.30	New	2	+2
Together for Catalonia (Junts)	433,200	2.47	+0.87	12	+5
Republican Left of Catalonia (ERC)	363,960	2.08	+0.19	8	+1
Basque Country Gather (EH Bildu)	278,472	1.59	+0.23	7	+1
Basque Nationalist Party (EAJ/PNV)	196,152	1.12	±0.00	4	−1
Galician Nationalist Bloc (BNG)	180,835	1.03	+0.41	2	+1
Canarian Coalition (CCa)	70,008	0.40	−0.07	1	±0
Others	704,762	4.02	—	0	±0
Blank ballots	124,655	0.71	−0.10		
Total	17,527,438			350	±0

=== Constituencies ===

Summary of constituency results in the 9 June 2024 European Parliament election in Spain
Constituency	PP		PSOE		Vox		Sumar		SALF		Podemos		Junts		ERC		EH Bildu		PNV		BNG		CCa	
Constituency	%	S	%	S	%	S	%	S	%	S	%	S	%	S	%	S	%	S	%	S	%	S	%	S
A Coruña	43.2	4	26.0	3	4.5	−	2.2	−	2.0	−	2.2	−									17.1	1		
Álava	17.6	1	28.8	1	3.9	−	3.8	−	2.3	−	3.6	−					21.4	1	15.2	1				
Albacete	42.6	2	31.1	2	11.4	−	3.2	−	5.7	−	2.3	−												
Alicante	38.2	6	31.3	5	11.7	1	5.6	−	6.0	−	2.6	−			0.3	−								
Almería	42.8	3	26.8	2	15.2	1	2.8	−	7.0	−	1.8	−												
Asturias	36.9	3	35.1	3	10.0	1	5.9	−	3.3	−	3.8	−												
Ávila	49.3	2	26.2	1	11.5	−	2.5	−	4.2	−	2.1	−												
Badajoz	41.5	3	36.7	2	9.9	−	2.5	−	3.6	−	2.1	−												
Balearic Islands	35.8	4	28.9	3	11.2	1	4.4	−	5.3	−	3.1	−												
Barcelona	14.3	5	32.1	12	6.0	2	4.8	1	2.8	−	5.1	1	15.8	6	14.1	5								
Biscay	11.7	1	26.5	3	2.7	−	3.3	−	1.8	−	3.2	−					22.7	2	25.5	2				
Burgos	42.7	2	31.3	2	10.0	−	3.4	−	4.0	−	2.6	−												
Cáceres	41.2	2	36.4	2	10.1	−	2.5	−	3.2	−	2.5	−												
Cádiz	36.8	4	31.8	4	10.8	1	5.6	−	6.5	−	2.9	−												
Cantabria	42.8	3	31.0	2	9.9	−	3.2	−	5.7	−	2.7	−												
Castellón	36.1	3	31.9	2	11.8	−	7.3	−	5.1	−	2.7	−			0.6	−								
Ceuta	36.5	1	32.2	−	16.7	−	1.6	−	7.8	−	2.0	−												
Ciudad Real	43.7	3	32.9	2	11.7	−	2.6	−	4.1	−	1.8	−												
Córdoba	39.7	3	31.4	3	10.2	−	6.5	−	5.3	−	2.6	−												
Cuenca	41.7	2	33.9	1	12.2	−	2.6	−	3.9	−	1.9	−												
Gipuzkoa	8.7	−	24.0	2	2.1	−	3.0	−	1.4	−	3.0	−					34.4	3	20.6	1				
Girona	9.5	−	23.3	2	5.7	−	3.0	−	2.2	−	3.2	−	32.1	3	16.2	1								
Granada	38.3	3	32.0	3	11.6	1	4.8	−	6.0	−	3.0	−												
Guadalajara	37.2	2	29.7	1	14.5	−	4.2	−	6.5	−	3.1	−												
Huelva	38.4	3	35.3	2	10.2	−	4.2	−	4.9	−	2.4	−												
Huesca	37.6	2	31.8	1	11.3	−	4.8	−	4.7	−	2.8	−												
Jaén	39.7	3	35.4	2	10.9	−	3.5	−	4.4	−	1.9	−												
La Rioja	44.6	2	32.6	2	8.8	−	3.3	−	3.7	−	2.4	−												
Las Palmas	30.2	3	31.6	4	12.9	1	4.6	−	6.8	−	3.4	−											6.5	−
León	41.7	2	33.8	2	10.3	−	2.8	−	4.0	−	2.5	−												
Lleida	12.3	−	23.9	1	6.1	−	2.2	−	2.3	−	2.2	−	27.4	2	19.3	1								
Lugo	49.8	3	25.8	1	4.5	−	1.2	−	1.7	−	1.3	−									12.9	−		
Madrid	40.7	17	28.2	11	10.7	4	5.8	2	5.1	2	4.5	1												
Málaga	38.7	5	29.5	4	11.4	1	5.0	−	7.4	1	2.8	−												
Melilla	40.0	1	33.7	−	14.1	−	1.7	−	5.9	−	1.6	−												
Murcia	42.9	5	25.1	3	15.9	2	3.3	−	6.6	−	2.4	−												
Navarre	28.0	2	28.8	2	6.7	−	3.9	−	3.1	−	3.2	−					18.7	1						
Ourense	51.0	3	25.8	1	4.5	−	1.2	−	1.8	−	1.2	−									11.7	−		
Palencia	44.4	2	32.2	1	10.6	−	2.6	−	4.0	−	1.9	−												
Pontevedra	39.5	4	28.9	2	4.2	−	2.6	−	2.3	−	2.2	−									17.4	1		
Salamanca	49.7	3	27.6	1	10.2	−	2.3	−	3.7	−	2.2	−												
Santa Cruz de Tenerife	28.4	2	29.3	3	11.0	1	3.4	−	5.9	−	3.5	−											14.2	1
Segovia	45.5	2	28.8	1	10.5	−	3.4	−	4.4	−	2.5	−												
Seville	34.7	5	34.4	5	9.6	1	6.0	−	6.3	1	3.5	−												
Soria	42.3	1	28.8	1	9.6	−	2.1	−	3.1	−	2.0	−												
Tarragona	14.8	1	28.9	3	7.9	−	2.9	−	3.4	−	3.0	−	17.7	1	16.8	1								
Teruel	37.0	2	28.6	1	11.2	−	3.0	−	4.6	−	1.8	−												
Toledo	40.8	3	31.3	2	14.4	1	3.0	−	4.9	−	2.2	−												
Valencia	34.4	6	31.5	6	11.3	2	8.9	1	5.8	1	3.4	−			0.5	−								
Valladolid	42.6	3	30.5	2	11.2	−	3.6	−	4.5	−	2.7	−												
Zamora	46.9	2	30.4	1	10.3	−	1.9	−	3.3	−	1.8	−												
Zaragoza	37.0	3	30.2	3	11.6	1	5.5	−	5.2	−	3.3	−												
Total	34.2	152	30.2	131	9.6	22	4.7	4	4.6	5	3.3	2	2.5	12	2.1	8	1.6	7	1.1	4	1.0	2	0.4	1

=== Regions ===

Summary of regional results in the 9 June 2024 European Parliament election in Spain
Region	PP		PSOE		Vox		Sumar		SALF		Podemos		Junts		ERC		EH Bildu		PNV		BNG		CCa	
Region	%	S	%	S	%	S	%	S	%	S	%	S	%	S	%	S	%	S	%	S	%	S	%	S
Andalusia	37.9	29	32.2	25	10.9	5	5.1	−	6.2	2	2.8	−												
Aragon	37.1	7	30.3	5	11.5	1	5.1	−	5.1	−	3.1	−												
Asturias	36.9	3	35.1	3	10.0	1	5.9	−	3.3	−	3.8	−												
Balearic Islands	35.8	4	28.9	3	11.2	1	4.4	−	5.3	−	3.1	−												
Basque Country	11.6	2	26.0	6	2.7	−	3.3	−	1.7	−	3.2	−					26.3	6	22.4	4				
Canary Islands	29.3	5	30.5	7	12.0	2	4.0	−	6.3	−	3.4	−											10.3	1
Cantabria	42.8	3	31.0	2	9.9	−	3.2	−	5.7	−	2.7	−												
Castile and León	44.5	19	30.5	12	10.5	−	2.9	−	4.0	−	2.4	−												
Castilla–La Mancha	41.5	12	31.7	8	13.0	1	3.0	−	5.0	−	2.2	−												
Catalonia	13.8	6	30.6	18	6.2	2	4.3	1	2.8	−	4.6	1	18.0	12	14.8	8								
Ceuta	36.5	1	32.2	−	16.7	−	1.6	−	7.8	−	2.0	−												
Extremadura	41.4	5	36.6	4	10.0	−	2.5	−	3.4	−	2.2	−												
Galicia	43.6	14	27.0	7	4.4	−	2.1	−	2.0	−	2.0	−									16.1	2		
La Rioja	44.6	2	32.6	2	8.8	−	3.3	−	3.7	−	2.4	−												
Madrid	40.7	17	28.2	11	10.7	4	5.8	2	5.1	2	4.5	1												
Melilla	40.1	1	33.7	−	14.1	−	1.7	−	5.9	−	1.6	−												
Murcia	42.9	5	25.1	3	15.9	2	3.3	−	6.6	−	2.4	−												
Navarre	28.0	2	28.8	2	6.7	−	3.9	−	3.1	−	3.2	−					18.7	1						
Valencian Community	35.8	15	31.5	13	11.5	3	7.7	1	5.8	1	3.0	−			0.4	−								
Total	34.2	152	30.2	131	9.6	22	4.7	4	4.6	5	3.3	2	2.5	12	2.1	8	1.6	7	1.1	4	1.0	2	0.4	1
