= Ahora Repúblicas =

Republics Now: Ahora Repúblicas (Spanish); Ara Repúbliques (Catalan); Orain Errepublikak (Basque); Agora Repúblicas (Galician); Agora Republicas (Aragonese); Agora Repúbliques (Asturian); Ara Republicas (Occitan)
- Leader: Diana Riba
- Founded: 3 April 2019
- Preceded by: The Left for the Right to Decide; The Peoples Decide
- Ideology: Secessionism; Souverainism; Republicanism; Regionalism; Social democracy Democratic socialism Left-wing nationalism
- Political position: Left-wing
- European Parliament group: G/EFA (ERC and BNG); The Left (EH Bildu)
- Members: See list of members
- European Parliament: 3 / 61

Website
- ahorarepublicas.eu

Republics Now (Spanish: Ahora Repúblicas; Catalan: Ara Repúbliques; Basque: Orain Errepublikak; Galician: Agora Repúblicas; Aragonese: Agora Republicas; Asturian: Agora Repúbliques; Occitan: Ara Republicas) is an electoral alliance formed for the 2019 European Parliament election in Spain by Republican Left of Catalonia (ERC), Basque Country Gather (EH Bildu) and Galician Nationalist Bloc (BNG) and with Oriol Junqueras as its leading candidate. The second list candidate was Diana Riba (wife of Raül Romeva, also imprisoned). The following candidates on the list were shared between EH Bildu, BNG and ERC. Moreover, Andecha Astur, Puyalón de Cuchas, Canarian Nationalist Alternative, National Congress of the Canaries and Unity of the People also participated in the candidature. It is a successor to The Left for the Right to Decide and The Peoples Decide coalitions in the 2014 election. ERC said that the alliance is open to other "Souverainist, republican and progressive forces".

== Composition ==
=== 2019 election ===
Party	Scope
Republican Left of Catalonia (ERC)	Catalan Countries
Basque Country Gather (EH Bildu)	Basque Country
Galician Nationalist Bloc (BNG)	Galicia
Andecha Astur (AA)	Asturias
Puyalón de Cuchas (Puyalón)	Aragon
Unity of the People (UP)	Canary Islands
Canarian Nationalist Alternative (ANC)	Canary Islands
Ahora Canarias (AC)	Canary Islands

=== 2024 election ===
Party	Scope
Republican Left of Catalonia (ERC)	Catalan Countries
Basque Country Gather (EH Bildu)	Basque Country
Galician Nationalist Bloc (BNG)	Galicia
Now More (Ara Més)	Balearic Islands

== Electoral performance ==
=== European Parliament ===
European Parliament
Election	Leading candidate	Votes	%	Seats	+/–	EP Group
2019	Oriol Junqueras	1,252,139	5.58 (#6)	3 / 59	New	Greens/EFA / The Left
2024	Diana Riba	856,500	4.91 (#4)	3 / 61	0	Greens/EFA / The Left
