= Diana Riba =

Spanish politician

Diana Riba MEP
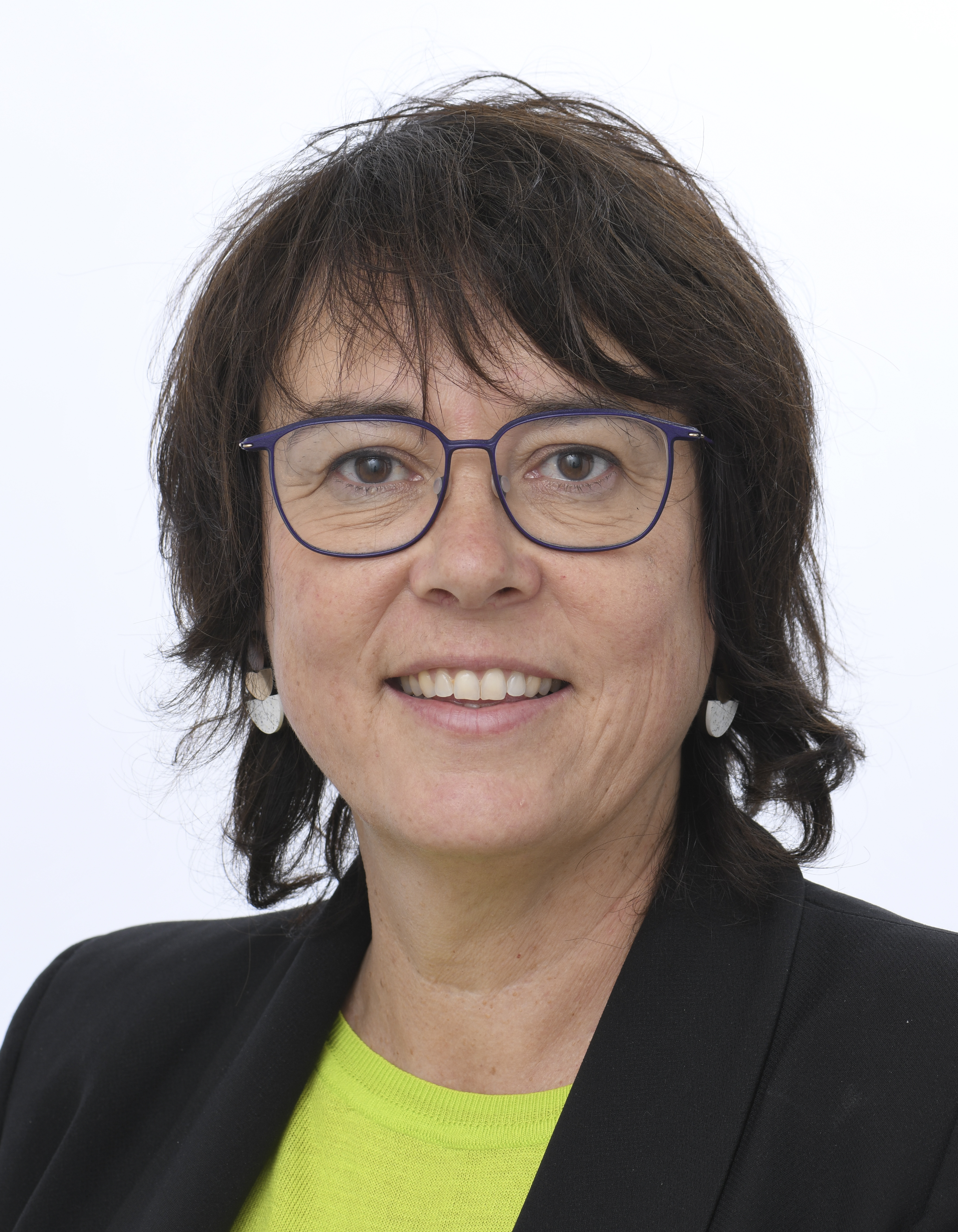
- Diana Riba in 2024

Member of the European Parliament
- Incumbent
- Assumed office 2 July 2019
- Constituency: Spain

Personal details
- Born: Diana Riba i Giner; 21 February 1975 (age 51) Barcelona, Catalonia, Spain
- Citizenship: Spain
- Party: Republican Left of Catalonia
- Other political affiliations: Ahora Repúblicas
- Spouse: Raül Romeva
- Children: 2
- Education: University of Barcelona

Diana Riba i Giner (Catalan pronunciation: [diˈanə ˈriβə]; born 21 February 1975) is a Catalan politician from Spain and a member of the European Parliament.

== Early life ==
Riba was born on 21 February 1975 in Barcelona, Catalonia, Spain. She has a degree in pedagogy from the University of Barcelona.

== Career ==
Riba started her career at the Center for Initiatives and Research Centers in the Mediterranean Foundation (CIREM). Later she worked for La Caixa Foundation co-ordinating and managing conferences on cinema and literature at the CaixaForum. She was a cultural programmer for the 2004 Universal Forum of Cultures held in Barcelona. She ran the Pati dels Llibres book shop in Sant Cugat del Vallès between 2008 and 2019. She was treasurer of the Catalan Council of the Children's and Youth Books (Consell Català del Llibre Infantil i Juvenil).

Riba is a member of the Castellers in Sant Cugat and the Catalan Association for Civil Rights (Associació Catalana pels Drets Civils). In December 2018 she was chosen by the Republican Left of Catalonia to be its number two candidate at the 2019 European Parliament election in Spain. She contested the election as an Republics Now electoral alliance candidate in Spain and was elected to the European Parliament.

== Personal life ==
Riba is the partner of formerly jailed Catalan minister Raül Romeva. They have two children – Elda and Noah.

== Electoral history ==
Electoral history of Diana Riba
Election	Constituency	Party	Alliance	No.	Result
2019 European	Spain	Republican Left of Catalonia	Republics Now	3	Elected
