= Raül Romeva =

Catalan politician (born 1971)

The Honourable Raül Romeva i Rueda
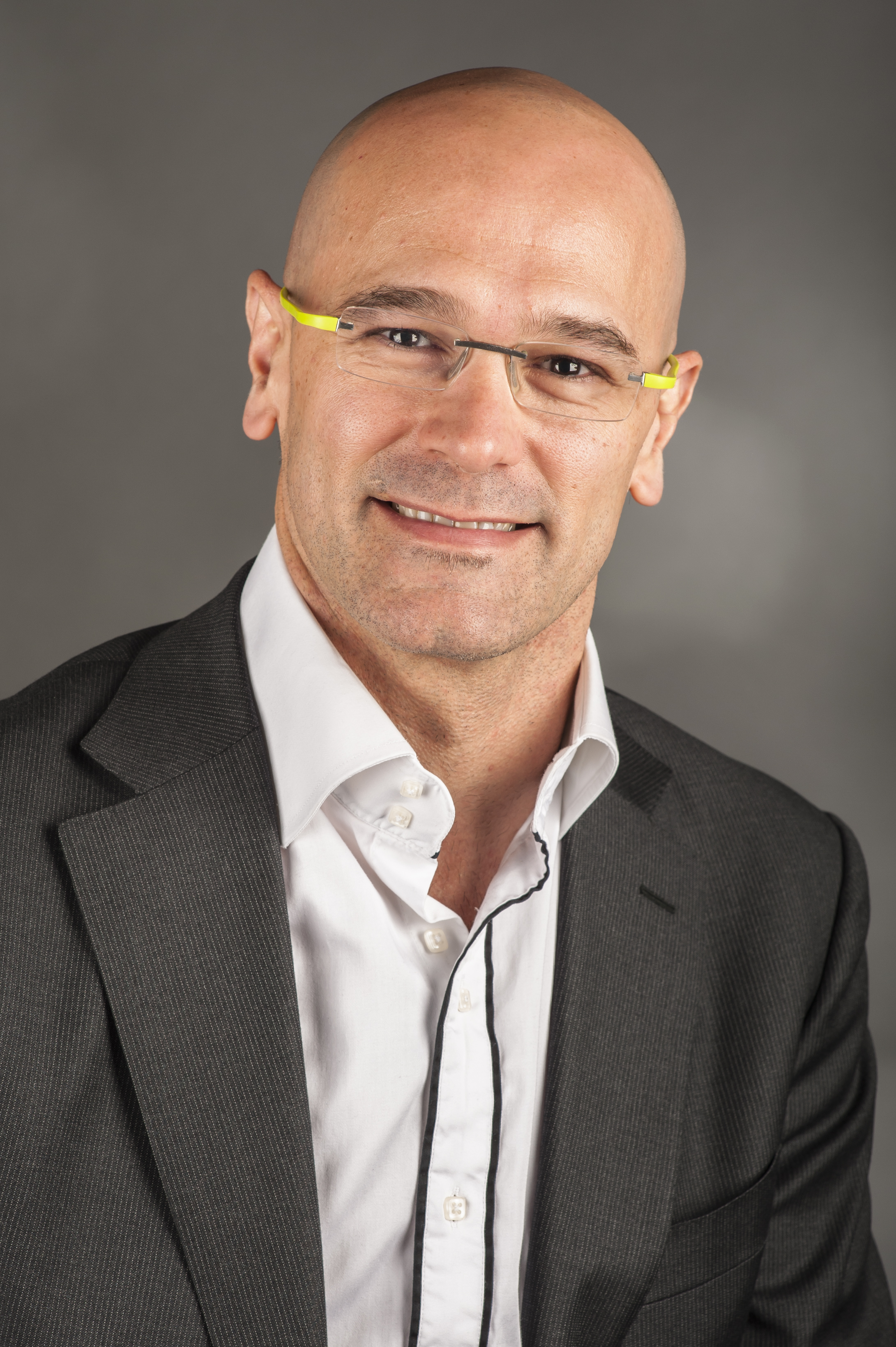

Senator of Spain
- In office 20 May 2019 – 29 May 2019
- Constituency: Barcelona

Minister for External and Institutional Relations, and Transparency of Catalonia
- In office 14 January 2016 – 27 October 2017
- President: Carles Puigdemont
- Preceded by: Position established
- Succeeded by: Ernest Maragall (direct rule until 2 June 2018)

Member of the Parliament of Catalonia for Barcelona
- In office 26 October 2015 – Suspended on 10 July 2018

Member of the European Parliament for Spain
- In office 20 July 2004 – 30 June 2014

Personal details
- Born: 12 March 1971 (age 55) Madrid, Spain
- Party: ERC
- Other political affiliations: ICV (1989–2015)
- Spouse: Diana Riba
- Children: 2
- Education: Autonomous University of Barcelona
- Occupation: Politician
- Profession: Economist

Raül Romeva i Rueda (born 12 March 1971) is a Catalan politician from Spain and a former Member of the European Parliament with the Iniciativa per Catalunya Verds, part of the European Greens. He sat on the European Parliament's Committee on Foreign Affairs and its Committee on Women's Rights and Gender Equality. In the Catalan parliamentary election of 2015 he led the pro-Catalan independence electoral list Junts pel Sí.

On 14 January 2016, he was named Minister for External and Institutional Relations, and Transparency in the Catalan Regional Government under President Carles Puigdemont, before his role was revoked by the Spanish government on the 27 October 2017, as part of the application of the constitution's article 155 during the Catalan crisis. Romeva spent almost 4 years in prison from 2017 to 2021, and in 2019 was sentenced to 12 years imprisonment for sedition along with other members of the Puigdemont government. He was pardoned in 2021 and freed from prison.

== Childhood and education ==
Born in Madrid, he lived in the Spanish capital until he was 9 years old, when he moved to Caldes de Montbui, in the province of Barcelona. He remained in Caldes until he was 22 years old. In 1989 he received a degree in economics from the Autonomous University of Barcelona (UAB) thirteen years later, on 2002, he earned his PhD in international relations at the same university.

== Career ==
From October 1995 to August 1996, Romeva was the principal aide of the UNESCO representative in Bosnia-Herzegovina, where he was responsible for the Educational programme and for promoting the UNESCO School of Peace Culture. He was also an observer for OSCE during the elections in Bosnia-Herzegovina in 1996 and 1997.

Romeva has been an assistant professor of International Relations at the UAB (1994–1995 and 1996–2002), researcher on peace and disarmament at the UNESCO Center of Catalunya (1994–1998) and campaign coordinator for disarmament and armed conflict prevention for Intermón-Oxfam (1998–1999). He contributes frequently to press and radio. He began his association with Iniciativa Catalunya Verds (ICV) in Caldes de Montbui in 1989. In 1994 and again in 1999 he was a candidate to the European Parliament for ICV, and in 2004 was elected as a Member of the European Parliament, where he held his seat until 2014. During this period, he was considered one of the most active politician of the European Parliament Chamber.

Romeva is currently a research analyst on armed conflict and postwar rehabilitation at the School of Peace Culture at the UAB. He is also the representative for Òmnium Cultural who are responsible for the Ara és l'hora (Now is the Time) campaign, organized by Òmnium and the Catalan National Assembly. On 15 July 2015, it was announced that Romeva would head Together for the Yes, the pro-independence list for Barcelona in the Catalan elections on 27 September 2015.

In the 2019 general election he was candidate to the Senate of Spain for the Province of Barcelona. He was sworn in on 20 May 2019, but on 29 May, by a recommendation of the Supreme Court, the Board of the Senate suspended him.

=== Imprisonment ===
On November 2, 2017, Judge Carmen Lamela, in charge of the sedition lawsuits against the dismissed government of Catalonia, issued an order that Raül Romeva, together with former vice-president Oriol Junqueras and seven other advisers to the Carles Puigdemont government, enter the prison that same day. Although he left the prison on bail, on March 23 Judge Pablo Llarena re-sentenced him again without bail, being admitted to the Madrid VII Prison Center of Estremera. In July 2018, he was transferred to a prison in Catalonia. On February 1, 2019, he was transferred back to a prison in Madrid, expecting trial that started on February the 12th and ended and was remitted to decision on 12 June 2019.

On 14 October 2019 he was sentenced to a 12 years of prison term and disqualification for the sedition and misuse of public funds crimes. He was pardoned and released, along with the other 8 jailed Catalonia independence leaders, in June 2021. Prime Minister Pedro Sánchez said that he pardoned them because it was the best decision for Spain and Catalonia, but did not overturn their bans from holding public office.

== Publications ==
Romeva has written several books and articles, including:

- —— (1997). Pau i seguretat a Europa: prevenció de conflictes armats a l'Europa de la postguerra freda. Centre UNESCO.
- —— (1999). Bòsnia-Hercegovina: lliçons d'una guerra. Centre UNESCO. ISBN 978-84-89622-60-9.
- —— (2000). Desarme y desarrollo: claves para armar conciencias [Disarmament and Development]. Intermón Oxfam. ISBN 978-84-89970-72-4.
- —— (2003). Bosnia en paz: lecciones, retos y oportunidades de una posguerra contemporánea. Catarata. ISBN 84-8319-158-X.
- —— (2003). Guerra, posguerra y paz: pautas para el análisis y la intervención en contextos posbélicos o postacuerdo [War, PostWar and Peace]. Icaria. ISBN 978-84-7426-652-8.
- —— (2012). Sayonara Sushi. Novel/ Plaza & Janés / Rosa dels Vents. ISBN 978-84-01-38800-2.
