= Ara Més =

Political party

- Founded: 29 April 2022
- Ideology: Democratic socialism Green politics Left-wing nationalism Catalan nationalism
- Political position: Left-wing
- National affiliation: Ahora Repúblicas (since 2024); Broad Front (confluence, since 2026); Senate of Progress (since 2026) (Note: In the Senate)
- European Parliament: 0 / 61

Website
- https://arames.cat/

Ara Més (transl. Now More) is an electoral alliance formed in the Balearic Islands in April 2022 between More for Mallorca (Més), More for Menorca (Més Menorca), Now Eivissa (Ara Eivissa) and independent people from Formentera, with the intention to contest the 2023 Spanish general election.

In June 2023, following the early election call after the 28 May local and regional elections, the alliance started talks to join Yolanda Díaz's Sumar, reaching an agreement as Sumar Més, with the exception of Ara Eivissa, that rejected to be part of the coalition. Despite this, Ara Eivissa contested the Senate election as part of the Ibiza and Formentera in the Senate coalition.

In early 2024, Ara Més joined Ara Repúbliques for the European Parliament election. In their electoral debut Ara Més ended up as the 5th most voted party in the Balearic Islands with 16.457 votes finishing after the far right.

== Composition ==
Party
More for Mallorca (Més)
More for Menorca (MxMe)
Now Ibiza (Ara Eivissa)

== Electoral Performance ==
=== European Parliament ===
European Parliament
Election	Total			Balearic Islands		
Election	2024	Within AR	0 / 61	0	16,547	5,17% (5th)
