= Workers' Revolutionary Current =

Revolutionary Workers' Current Corriente Revolucionaria de Trabajadores y Trabajadoras
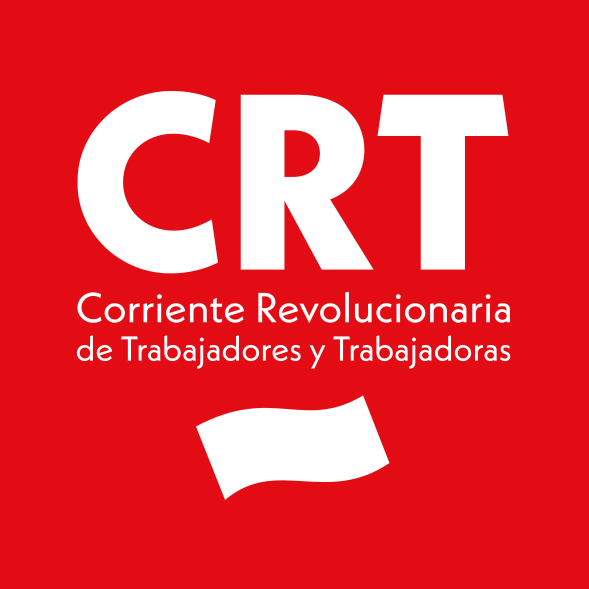
- Founded: 2005 (as CcC); 2017 (as CRT)
- Split from: Nuevo Claridad
- Headquarters: Barcelona
- Newspaper: Contracorriente; La Izquierda Diario
- Youth wing: Contracorriente
- Ideology: Trotskyism; Revolutionary socialism
- Political position: Far-left
- International affiliation: Trotskyist Fraction – Fourth International

Website
- crtweb.org

The Workers' Revolutionary Current (in Spanish: Corriente Revolucionaria de Trabajadores y Trabajadoras; in Catalan: Corrent Revolucionària de Treballadors i Treballadores) is a Trotskyist group in Spain.

== History ==
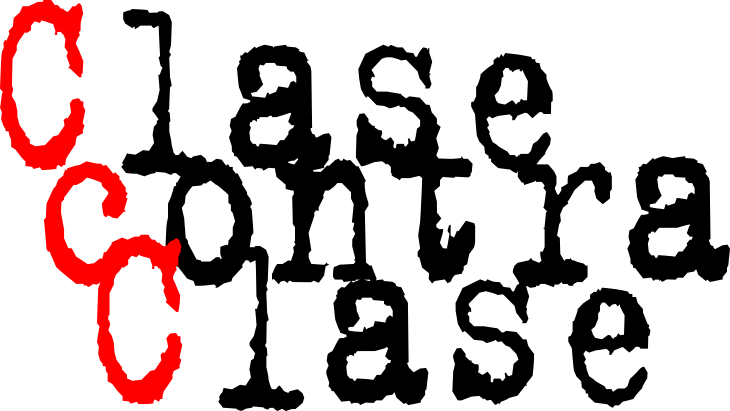
Old logo used back when the CRT was named CcC.

It emerged around 2005, as a split of Nuevo Claridad after being integrated in Izquierda Unida's reformist project since 1993 and had abandoned a line of class independence; following a conference given in Spain by the Bolivian leader of the LOR-CI, Javo Ferreira, they came into contact with the Trotskyist Fraction - Fourth International, attending their third international conference in that year and establishing themselves as their Spanish section under the name Class against Class (CcC). With the emergence of the 15M movement, Class against Class managed to make a qualitative leap and could grow in the rest of the state due to the participation they had in the movement. They participated actively in the general strikes of 2012 in that country, supported the strike of the Panrico bakery workers in Barcelona (the largest since the Spanish Civil War), the workers' struggle at the Santa Perpetua Coca-Cola factory, the struggle of the hoteliers grouped in the platform Las Kellys and the strike of the Movistar workers. After a period of organic growth, Class against Class held an extraordinary conference and there resolved to change its name to Workers' Revolutionary Current.

The CRT's information site is Izquierda Diario.es, written by the people of the party as a newspaper. Izquierda Diario.es is a part of the International Network La Izquierda Diario, published by the organizations making up the Trotskyist Fraction for the Fourth International. Before May 2016, the CRT published "Contracorriente", first as a monthly bulletin, later (since 2015) as a cultural and political magazine.

The CRT maintains organizational independence from the big left-wing parties of Spain, including Podemos and United Left. Its youth wing is Contracorriente ("Countercurrent"), formerly the Agrupación Revolucionaria No Pasarán (Revolutionary Group "They Shall Not Pass" - ARNP). They also promote the Spanish section of the feminist group Pan y Rosas ("Bread and Roses").

The CRT maintains a strong presence in Barcelona, Zaragoza and Madrid, being part of the student and worker's movement of those cities and pushing the Left Student Union (Sindicato de Estudiantes de Izquierdas). The CRT currently is pushing the initiative No Hay Tiempo que Perder (there is no time to lose) to regroup the anti-capitalist left and expelled dissidents of Podemos.

In 2024 the CRT contested the European Parliament election, gaining 5,527 votes (0,03%) and no seats.
