= Union, Progress and Democracy =

Union, Progress and Democracy Unión, Progreso y Democracia
- Spokesperson: Cristiano Brown
- Founded: 26 September 2007 in San Sebastián
- Dissolved: 6 December 2020
- Headquarters: C/ Juan Bravo, 3A; 28006, Madrid
- Think tank: Progress and Democracy Foundation
- Membership (2017): 1,154
- Ideology: Social liberalism; Progressivism; Radical centrism; Centralism; Pro-Europeanism
- Political position: Centre
- European Parliament group: Non-Inscrits (2009–2014); ALDE Group (2014–2019)
- Colours: Magenta

Website
- www.upyd.es

Union, Progress and Democracy (Spanish: Unión, Progreso y Democracia [unˈjon, pɾoˈɣɾeso j ðemoˈkɾaθja], UPyD [upejˈðe]) was a Spanish radical centrist political party founded in September 2007 and dissolved in December 2020. It was a social-liberal party that rejected any form of nationalism, especially the separatist Basque and Catalan movements. The party was deeply pro-Europeanist and wanted the European Union to adopt a federal system without overlap between European, national, and regional governments. It also wanted to replace the State of Autonomies with a much more centralist, albeit still politically decentralized, unitary system as well as substituting a more proportional election law for the current one. (Note: Until its 1st Congress in November 2009, UPyD used the term “decentralized unitary state" to define its model of State. However, the magenta party decided on using the term "cooperative federal state" since the 1st UPyD Congress because its leaders thought that a strong unitary state with political decentralization is, despite not having a Senate, a federal state.)

UPyD first stood for election in the 9 March 2008 general election. It received 303,246 votes, or 1.2% of the national total. It won one seat in the Congress of Deputies for party co-founder Rosa Díez, becoming the newest party with national representation in Spain. Although its core was in the Basque Autonomous Community, with roots in anti-ETA civic associations, it addressed a national audience. Prominent members of the party included philosopher Fernando Savater, party founder and former PSOE MEP Rosa Díez, philosopher Carlos Martínez Gorriarán and writer Álvaro Pombo.

In the general elections held on 20 November 2011, the party won 1,143,225 votes (4.70 percent), five seats which it was able to form a parliamentary group with in the Congress of Deputies (four in Madrid and one in Valencia) and became the fourth-largest political force in the country. It had the greatest increase of votes over the previous general election of any party. In the 2015 general election, however, it suffered a decline in its vote power by losing all of its seats. In the 2016 general election, it dropped to just 0.2% of the national vote.

On 18 November 2020, a judge ordered the dissolution of the party and its erasure from the registry of political parties, as it did not have the financial solvency to pay off the debt contracted with a former worker. The party announced that it would appeal the sentence. On 6 December 2020, it was announced that the party would no longer appeal the sentence, thus formally extinguishing UPyD.

== History ==
=== Origins ===
==== Background ====
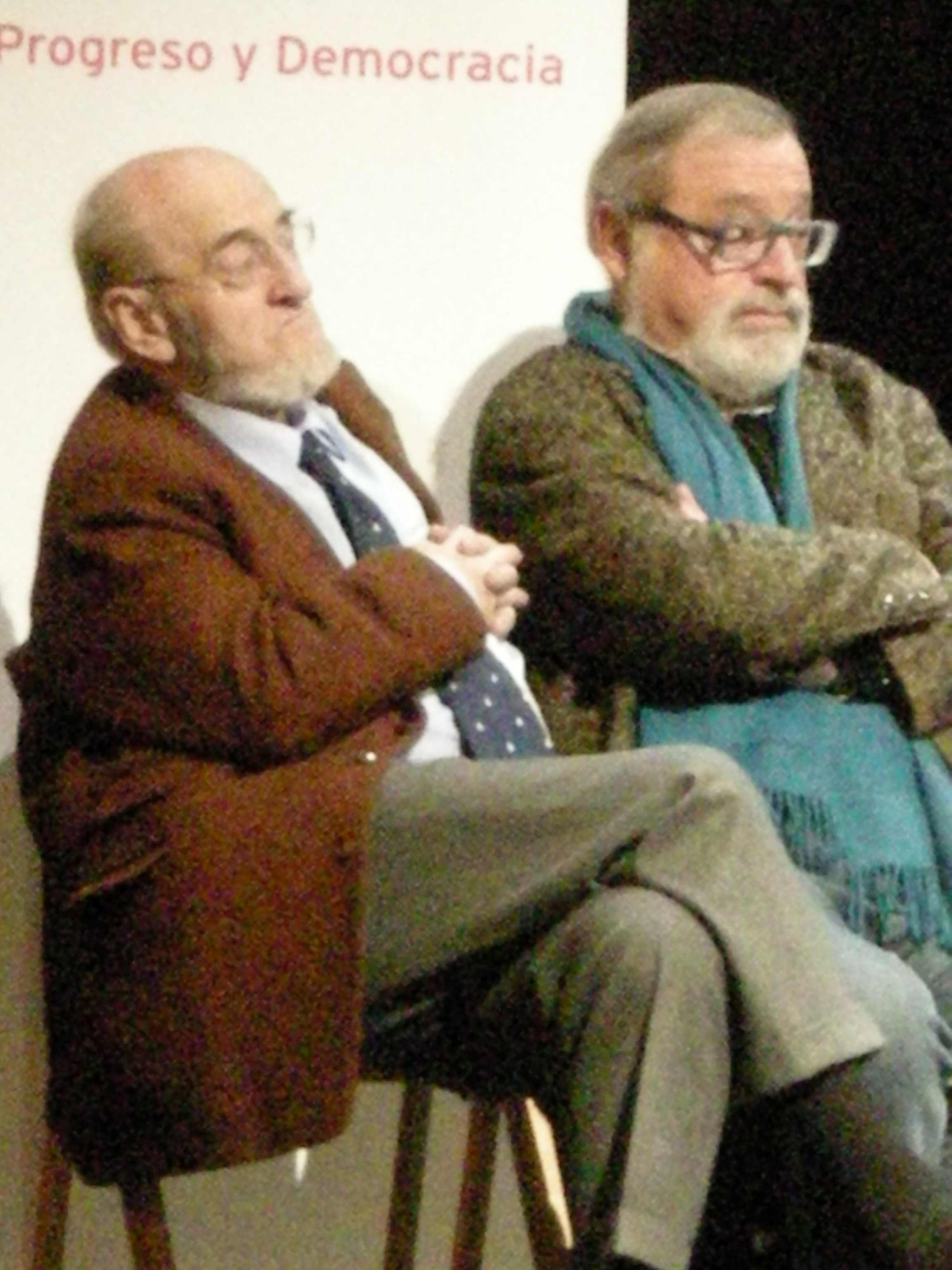
Álvaro Pombo (left) and Fernando Savater at a party meeting

On 19 May 2007, 45 people met in San Sebastián to discuss the creation of a new political party opposing both major parties (the People's Party and the Spanish Socialist Workers' Party) at the national level. Most present were Basques, many of whom had long experience in political, union and civic organizations with left-wing, liberal and activist backgrounds. After the meeting, to create a broad-based social and political project they formed the Plataforma Pro organization. This united those who considered it necessary to form a new national political party appealing to people across the democratic political spectrum. Its platform was mainly centered around the fight against ETA and politically motivated violence, the regeneration of Spanish democracy and reforming the Constitution of 1978 to reinforce civil liberties and equality, independent of regional origin.

Among the supporters of Plataforma Pro were philosopher Fernando Savater, ¡Basta Ya! coordinator and spokesman Carlos Martínez Gorriarán and former Spanish Socialist Workers' Party (PSOE) MEP Rosa Díez. Díez resigned her PSOE membership and her MEP position in August 2007 to become involved with the UPyD project. Groups supporting Plataforma Pro included Citizens of Catalonia (notably Albert Boadella, Arcadi Espada and Xavier Pericay) and ¡Basta Ya!, a major influence on the new movement. In September 2007, Forum Ermua president Mikel Buesa announced their intention to participate in the political party arising from Plataforma Pro; he resigned in 2009 due to disagreements with Rosa Díez.

==== Founding ====
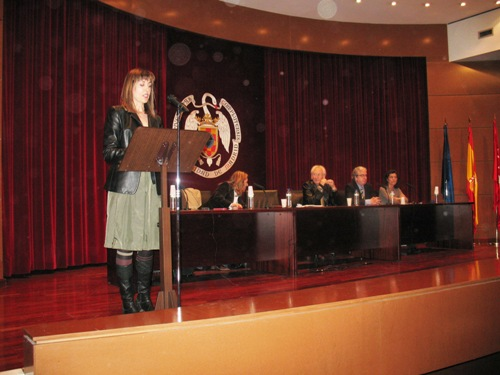
Teresa Giménez Barbat, UPyD council member in Catalonia and president of Citizens of Catalonia

At a 29 September 2007 meeting in the auditorium of the Casa de Campo in Madrid, the new party was formed under the name of Union, Progress and Democracy. Participants in its formation included Catalan dramatist Albert Boadella, Basque philosopher Fernando Savater, Peruvian writer Mario Vargas Llosa and Rosa Díez. Also present were journalist Arcadi Espada, anthropologists Teresa Giménez Barbat and Felix Perez Romera (three prominent Citizens of Catalonia members), historian Antonio Elorza, painter Agustín Ibarrola, former Forum Ermua leader Mikel Buesa, philosopher Carlos Martínez Gorriarán, Citizens deputies Albert Rivera and Antonio Robles Almeida, Peruvian writer Fernando Iwasaki, former UGT secretary general Nicolas Redondo and People's Party Basque MP Fernando Maura. Maura joined the new party's advisory council on 6 November 2007. Writer Álvaro Pombo later expressed support for UPyD, running as a candidate for the party.

=== Infighting ===
In July 2009, party co-founder Mikel Buesa announced his resignation from UPyD, denouncing "authoritarian control" imposed by a group in the party. After its First Party Congress in November 2009, 100 UPyD critics (including four founding members) left the party, "tired and disappointed" with the "authoritarian" Rosa Díez and the party's "lack of internal democracy". By early 2010, the party lost 40% of its membership in Catalonia, amid allegations that the party was a fraud.

=== Elections ===
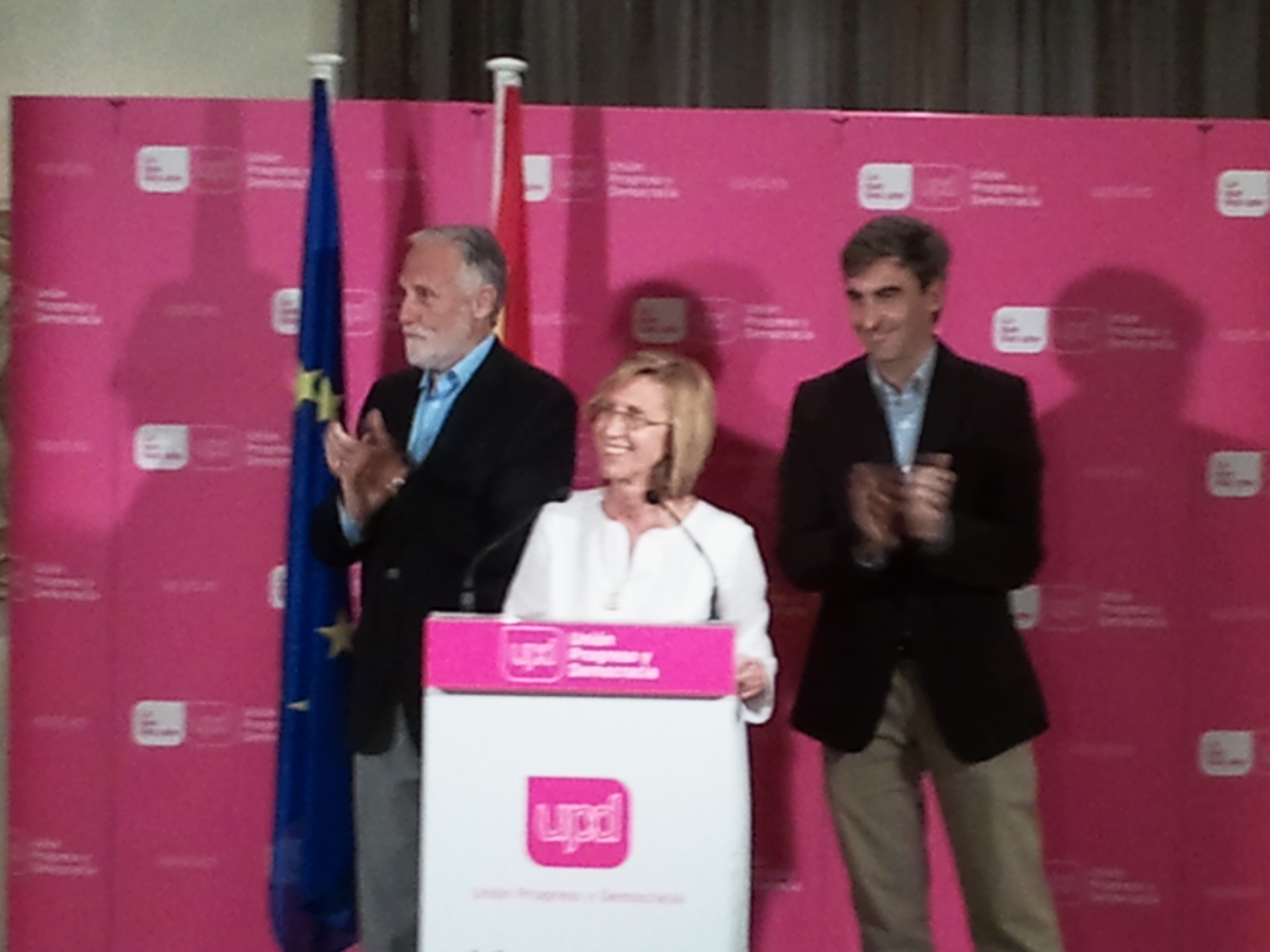
Luis de Velasco Rami, Rosa Díez and David Ortega

The party's national spokesperson, Rosa Díez, won a seat in the general election of 2008 from Madrid Province with 3.74 percent of the vote. Other prominent candidates were writer Álvaro Pombo (for the Senate) and Carlos Martínez Gorriarán, both of whom failed to win seats.

In 2009, the party gained representation in the European Parliamentary election and the Basque Regional Elections. Their MEP, Francisco Sosa Wagner, sat in the non-aligned group in the European parliament. In the Basque elections, Gorka Maneiro was elected to represent Álava.

In 2011, Luis de Velasco Rami and seven other UPyD members were elected to the Madrid Assembly, with UPyD becoming the fourth-largest party. In the 2011 local elections, the party won seats in Madrid, Burgos, Ávila, Granada, Alicante and Murcia. UPyD received the fourth-largest number of votes in the 2011 general election: 1,143,225, or 4.70%. Of the five seats won, four (held by Rosa Díez, Carlos Martínez Gorriarán, Álvaro Anchuelo and Irene Lozano) were in Madrid; actor Toni Cantó was elected in Valencia Province.

In the 2014 European Parliament Elections, Francisco Sosa Wagner was re-elected, and UPyD won three extra seats (for Maite Pagazaurtundúa, Fernando Maura and Beatriz Becerra), consolidating their support nationwide. The party's MEPs joined the Alliance of Liberals and Democrats for Europe (ALDE) Group.

=== Decay and dissolution ===
In the 2015 general election, UPyD suffered a decline in its vote power by losing all of its seats, while the liberal Citizens party emerged as an alternative. By the 2016 general election, the party's popularity dropped to just 0.2% of the national vote.

The party took part in the 2019 European Parliament elections in the party list of Citizens, achieving a single MEP.

On 18 November 2020, the party's dissolution and its erasure from the registry of political parties was ordered, as it did not have the financial solvency to pay off the debt contracted with a former worker. The party announced that it would appeal the sentence, but on 6 December 2020 the party announced that it would no longer appeal it, thus formally extinguishing UPyD.

== Ideology ==
=== Official stance ===
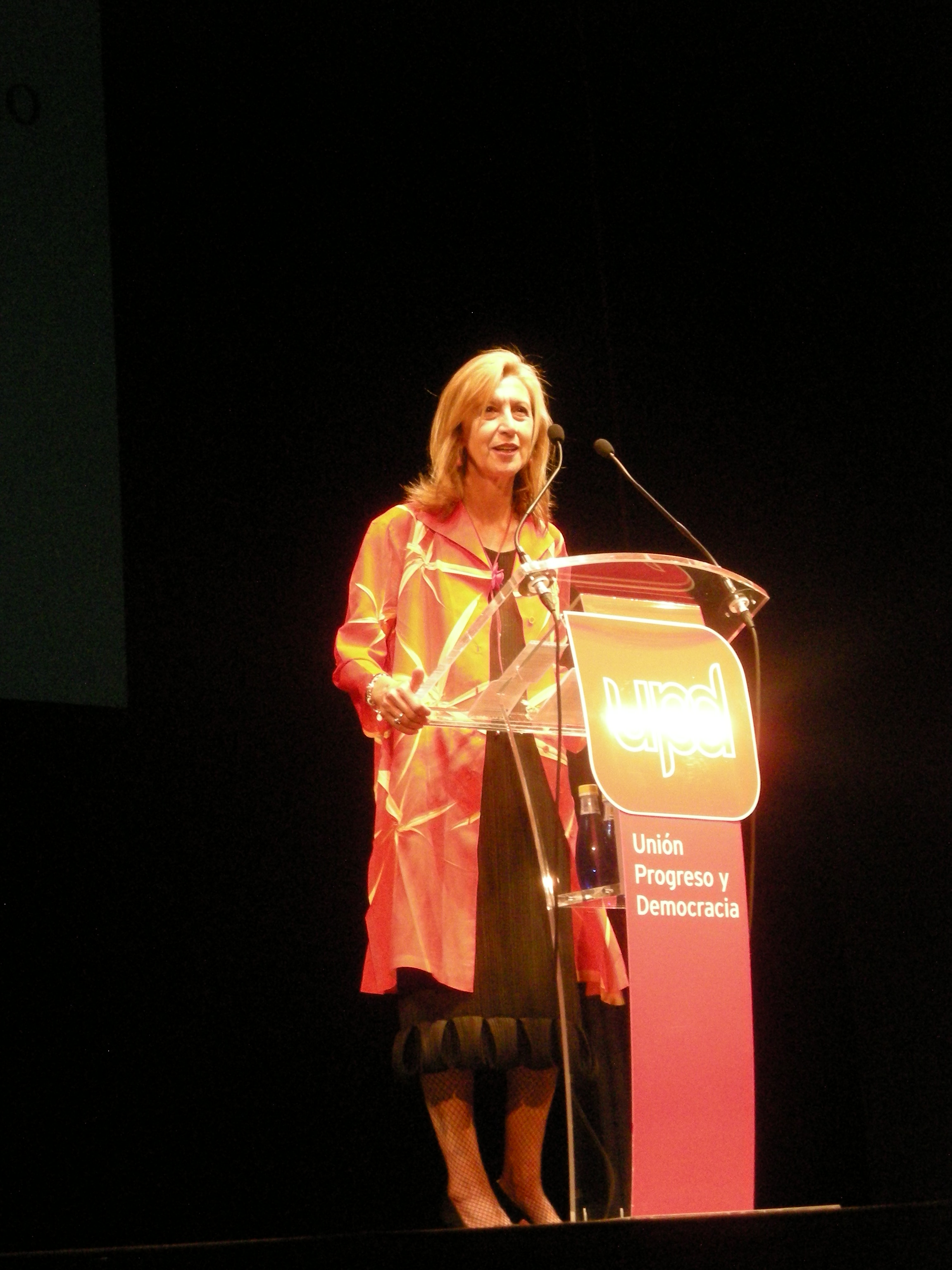
Rosa Díez at a party meeting

Ideologically, UPyD did not align itself with either the left or the right. Likewise, the magenta party refused to position itself within centrism. When asked to locate itself on the left–right political spectrum, UPyD defined itself simply as a progressive party that stood up for transversality. Consequently, the party vehemently defended the ideas it deemed progressive across the entire political spectrum. The magenta electorate included not only ex-voters disillusioned with the Socialist Party but also electors from the right. According to spokesperson Rosa Díez, UPyD embraced both left-wing progressives and right-wing liberals. Other additional identity signs were the following:

- "Centralism": defined as "the political concentration of key powers—such as education, health, water resource management, and transport management—within a strong unitary state". In contrast, non-essential responsibilities would have been symmetrically assigned to the autonomous communities.
- "Constitutionalism": defined as "the maintenance of the Spanish rule of law by enforcing the Spanish Constitution of 1978 in regions where it is violated and non-nationalist citizens suffer discrimination. Simultaneously, the instrumental articles of the Constitution should be amended to ensure that its non-negotiable ones—those upholding freedom, equality, cohesion, the separation of powers, and the protection of all Spanish citizens under an independent judiciary—are effectively implemented".
- "Liberal democracy": defined as "the form of government which best balances power and individual rights".
- "Monarchism": defined as "the acceptance of the monarchy of Spain insofar as it carries out its function with austerity, transparency, and exemplary conduct".
- "Non-nationalism": defined as "the opposition to compulsory nationalism". Rosa Díez denied that the magenta party identified with anti-nationalism, Spanish nationalism and postnationalism.
- "Pro-Europeanism": defined as "the desire to move toward a genuine European federalism, with the concept of citizenship as a fundamental pillar".
- "Radicalism: defined as "the ambition of transforming politics by bringing off substantial, in-depth changes from within institutions".
- "Secularism": defined as "the neutrality of the state not only toward all legitimate religious beliefs but also the convictions of non-believers". However, UPyD would not have applied this neutrality to religions such as Islam, which it did not consider as respectful of human rights and the Spanish rule of law.
- "Social liberalism": defined as "the support for a mixed economic system in which the free-market economy features broad state intervention to correct its social inefficiencies, thereby making the welfare state compatible with individual liberty". Rosa Díez specified that social liberalism was UPyD's core political doctrine, since the party combines elements of political liberalism and social democracy.
- "Spanish patriotism": defined as "the defence of shared values, which mostly are justice, freedom, equality, and loyalty to one's fellow countrymen". Rosa Díez asserted that UPyD was an unequivocally national party that had a unique agenda for Spain.

=== Outside sources ===
UPyD was assessed by the vast majority of political scientists and the media such as the European Social Survey, The Financial Times and The Economist as a centrist party, even though it was considered as centre-left by the political scientist Donatella Maria Viola and by the Journal on Ethnopolitics and Minority Issues in Europe, and centre-right by the Encyclopædia Britannica. The self-proclaimed cross-sectionalism of UPyD has been linked to radical centrism.

UPyD was a progressive party which combined social liberalism with centralism from the centre of the political spectrum. It's worth stressing that the centralist UPyD was the only statewide party that, until the appearance of Vox, actively defended the abolition of chartered regimes in all Spain, even in those regions which have them: Navarre and the Basque Country. Similarly, UPyD argued that the extreme political decentralization of the State of Autonomies has weakened the welfare state and created inequalities across the territory. Accordingly, UPyD wanted to adopt a symmetrically decentralized unitary system with broad political centralization in Spain.

UPyD defended the unity of Spain, thereby being an enemy of peripheral nationalism and the existence of several national identities within Spain. The magenta party advocated for the indissoluble unity of the Spanish nation so unconditionally that it supported the application of Article 155 of Spain's Constitution so as to suspend Catalonia's home rule, and the prosecution of Catalan separatist leaders for rebellion and sedition. Although UPyD was a progressive party strongly characterized by its rejection of peripheral nationalism, it also had objections to nation-state nationalism, including Spanish nationalism, because the party considered this kind of nationalism to be a threat to the progress of Europe's unity. UPyD was deeply pro-European and therefore supported a federal Europe, which the magenta party saw as an important guarantor of individual rights.

=== Criticism ===
Political scientist Ignacio Sánchez-Cuenca, professor of Sociology at the Complutense University of Madrid, accused UPyD of aiming to combat "Basque and Catalan nationalism with a good dose of Spanish nationalism". He criticized its commitment to an electoral law that "prevents peripheral nationalist parties from having a significant presence in the Spanish Parliament" because, in his mind, fighting against nationalism with institutional reforms would mean "sacrificing the most essential elements of our democracy". Sánchez-Cuenca concluded that "the ideology of UPyD seems clearly broken".

Although UPyD claims to be a social liberal party that rejects any form of nationalism, the party has been branded as a Spanish nationalist one, as well as by Ignacio Sánchez-Cuenca, by the journalist Javier Ortiz, by some writers such as Mónica Dorange, José Ramón Montero and Ignacio Lago and Jean-Pierre Cabestan and Aleksandar Pavković and by the scholarly association European Consortium for Political Research. This may be due to UPyD's defence of positions associated with Spanish nationalism, like denying the existence of differentiated nations in the state by stating that "the Spanish nation is the only nation that exists in Spain", the recovery by law of place names in Spanish of provinces, cities, municipalities and geographic features in the autonomous communities with a co-official language, the amendment of the Spanish Constitution so that there is not any distinction between nationalities and regions and Gibraltar's restitution to Spanish sovereignty.

Former president José Luis Rodríguez Zapatero criticized UPyD because, in his opinion, centralism has caused even more inequality than the current autonomic state and he pointed out that equality should not be confused with uniformity. Rosa Díez replied that "neither centralism nor autonomy guarantees equality, which can only be ensured by redistributive laws".

The PP's member Ignacio González, despite admitting his agreement on issues such as the anti-terrorist policy and territorial integrity, has placed UPyD on the far-left of the political spectrum. Gotzone Mora, who called to vote for the PP after belonging to the PSE-EE, said that UPyD's ideas are already defended by the PP and she accused UPyD of being the PSOE's submarine.

== Platform ==
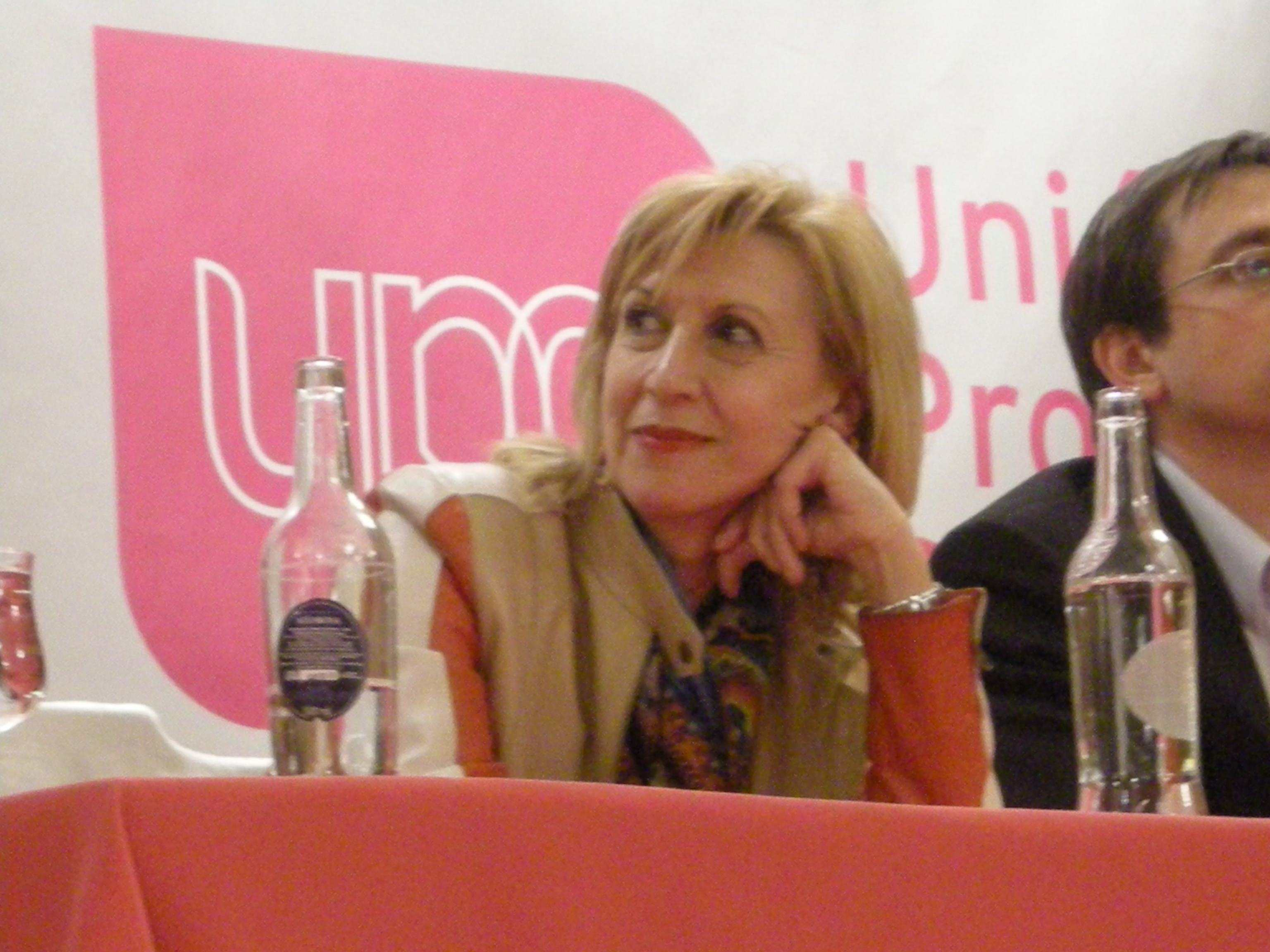
Rosa Díez at a party meeting

=== Domestic policy ===
UPyD advocated significant changes to the democratic system, such as the abolition of the requirement for extraparliamentary parties to gather 0.1% of each constituency's electorate to stand in elections; the ban on sending election propaganda by post, either subsidised or not; the adoption of an open list panachage system; and the direct election of mayors in a two-round system to prevent post-election pacts from misrepresenting the citizens' will. UPyD's other measures for democracy regeneration were: a limit of two consecutive full terms for executive public office holders; a ban on combining two or more public offices; and the strengthening of the incompatibility regime for former high office holders as a way of reducing their potential conflicts of interest. The party also urged making political parties' funding more transparent and independent of business interests.

The party advocated the improvement and reinforcement of individual rights and obligations, which were to be strictly defined for all Spaniards without territorial, linguistic, ideological, or religious inequalities. By advocating a unitary and centralising concept of the Spanish nation, UPyD defended Spain's unity as "a key instrument to ensure the equality of all Spanish citizens".

UPyD called for a stronger separation of powers through greater judiciary autonomy from the legislature and the executive, thereby consolidating judicial unity across the country and fostering the independence of the Constitutional Court, Court of Accounts and economic regulators from the executive.

==== State model ====
UPyD endorsed reforming the Spanish Constitution of 1978 to dismantle the Spanish State of Autonomies. UPyD wanted Spain to be a strong unitary state with stringent, symmetric political decentralisation, thereby defining in the Constitution which powers were exclusive to the state and which could be transferable to autonomous communities or municipalities. Arguing that the autonomous state not only created inequalities across the country but was also "elephantine, politically unviable and economically unsustainable", the party advocated centralising powers that affected citizens' fundamental rights such as education, health, justice, and taxation. UPyD's territorial model would have abolished Navarre's and the Basque Country's fueros by creating a common financial structure for all autonomous communities. Other notable proposals were the following: the merging of municipalities to ensure that they had a minimum size of 20,000 inhabitants; the suppression of provincial councils, the Basque General Assemblies, charter councils, and district councils; and the unicameralism of the Spanish General Courts after eliminating the Senate.

==== Electoral system ====
The party advocated reforming the Organic Act of the General Electoral Regime (LOREG) with three objectives: to achieve equality among voters regardless of their place of residence; to increase the representation of minority parties, which are under-represented compared to the majority parties in the current electoral system; and to reduce the representation of regionalist and peripheral nationalist parties. The reform involved a biproportional distribution of 350 seats in the Congress of Deputies. Of these, one seat would have been allocated to each province and autonomous city (52 seats in total). The Sainte-Laguë method would have distributed the remaining 298 seats among the provinces according to their population. To ensure proportional representation, the allocation of seats to parties would have been under the votes received in the sum of the 52 constituencies, thus preventing a party with fewer votes from winning more seats than a party with more votes. Firstly, the value of the r-parameter, 0.25% of the total valid votes, would have been calculated. Parties with fewer votes than the r-parameter would have been excluded from the seat allocation process. Next, the D'Hondt method would have assigned 325 seats proportionally to the reduced votes and the remaining 25 seats based on the square of the reduced votes to "achieve fairness in party representation and make governance and proportionality compatible". Finally, the BAZI computer programme, developed at the University of Augsburg, would have distributed the seats won by each party in the 52 constituencies.

==== Terrorism ====
UPyD supported counterterrorist measures with the aim of defeating ETA, such as cutting off its funding and impeding its political legitimacy. Consequently, UPyD proposed a stricter law on political parties, which would have outlawed all parties belonging to the EH Bildu coalition (Alternatiba, Aralar, Eusko Alkartasuna, and Sortu) (Note: UPyD called for the outlawing of Bildu and formerly Amaiur, which dissolved in 2015.) on the grounds that they were "an extension of ETA's political arm". The magenta party argued that these parties had not condemned ETA's terrorism and, in fact, had even justified ETA's killings. One example of this was the use of the term "political prisoners" to describe ETA's imprisoned members.

The party also advocated the unconditional approval of specific budgetary allocations to strengthen the human and material resources of the Spanish security forces and intelligence services so that they could fight against Islamic terrorism under optimal conditions. Moreover, UPyD supported Spain's military deployment in Syria to destroy the Islamic State as part of a European resolution under the United Nations' protection.

==== Justice ====
UPyD supported reforming the Spanish Penal Code to impose an indefinite imprisonment sentence for crimes of the utmost gravity, having previously submitted this issue to a consultative referendum. The criminals condemned would have had the possibility of parole or pardon after spending a minimum of 35 years in prison if they had received a favourable, individualised prognosis for social reintegration in a sentence review process.

=== Society ===
UPyD endorsed same-sex marriage and same-sex couples' adoption, regarding homophobia as "utterly reprehensible" and contending that a traditional family was not "the only valid option". The magenta party favoured the regularisation of surrogacy and voluntary prostitution, and the legalization of euthanasia coupled with assisted suicide as a way of offering terminally ill people the option of dying without prolonged suffering.

The party endorsed the decriminalisation of cannabis, but would have maintained the prohibition of other illegal drugs.

==== Bullfighting ====
The party supported bullfighting as a national festival and advocated the exclusive competence of the state to regulate bullfighting to prevent the Spanish autonomous communities from banning bullfighting traditions. However, UPyD refused to recognise the intangible cultural heritage status of bullfighting. The party also rejected providing grants-in-aid to bullfighting events at either the European or Spanish (local, regional and national) level, thereby making Spaniards responsible for determining the future of bullfights based on their attendance or non-attendance at bullrings. Lastly, UPyD supported the abolition of the Toro de la Vega tournament and the Toro embolado.

==== Religion ====
By making Spain a secular state, the party supported revising existing agreements with the Holy See, the self-financing of the Catholic Church and other religious confessions, and the complete separation of church and state. Secularism for UPyD consisted of "fair treatment of all legitimate religious beliefs, i.e., those compatible with human rights, the rule of law, and democracy". UPyD stated that "Islam isn't a legitimate religion because it establishes men's superiority over women, it doesn't even respect the right to be a nonbeliever, and above all, it rejects the essence of the Universal Declaration of Human Rights, which is why Islam has its declaration of human rights justifying the existence of practices such as adulterous women's stoning and homosexuals' murder through Sharia law". Following this line of thought, the party supported the ban on Islamic headscarves (from the burqa to the hijab) in public spaces, since they are "a way to subjuge women to men within Islam".

==== Abortion ====
UPyD supported a law decriminalising induced abortion within the first fourteen weeks of pregnancy. Beyond that gestational period, UPyD would have only allowed abortions in cases of "foetal anomalies incompatible with life and the risk of the mother's death, thereby reconciling the mother's right to consent to maternity with the unborn's legal protection". According to the party, "abortion is always a drama because an embryo conceived by two people is a human being". Consequently, UPyD argued that regulating abortion as a right rather than decriminalising it under certain circumstances was not respectful of Article 15 of the Spanish Constitution, which applies to the unborn according to the Constitutional Court's jurisprudence. Therefore, the magenta party supported early sex education, which would have informed high school students about all available contraceptive methods to prevent unwanted pregnancies while encouraging them to steer clear of abortion as much as possible. Finally, UPyD opposed abortion access by minors without parental consent.

=== Economy ===
As a social liberal party, UPyD advocated a free-market economy subject to necessary state interventions to eliminate tax evasion, provide quality public goods or services and increase equity in income distribution. Thus, the party proposed economic measures such as the reform of the wealth tax to convert it into a tax on large fortunes, raising the minimum exemptions so that people with average wealth were not taxed and eliminating any mechanism that would have allowed tax avoidance.

UPyD endorsed granting the Department of Financial and Tax Inspection of the Spanish Tax Agency the power to assess compliance with the qualifications for a company to be recognised as a SICAV. This would have involved the Tax Agency issuing a binding report to the National Securities Market Commission (CNMV) to prevent individuals and family groups from fraudulently taking advantage of the tax benefits associated with SICAVs by using them as an investment tool.

=== Education ===
The party promoted the enhancement of education through the implementation of a secular public education system that strengthened scientific research and eradicated linguistic discrimination. UPyD rejected compulsory language immersion in autonomous communities with more than one official language, thereby defending the freedom to choose the language of instruction for all non-linguistic subjects and ensuring bilingualism by making the regional language as well as Spanish two required subjects. The party also opposed linguistic discrimination in all public services.

=== Environment ===
UPyD's environmental policy sought to ensure the compatibility of technological and economic development with environmental and biodiversity protection. Some of UPyD's measures were the following: the use of nuclear power as an essential part of Spain's energy mix, which would have also included renewable energy and hydraulic fracturing; the cessation of subsidies for coal mining and the closure of cost-inefficient mines; scientific research into climate change and its possible corrective measures; and the strengthening of legislation protecting natural areas to halt the loss of the coastline and sensitive natural areas due to urbanisation and other misuses.

=== Foreign policy ===
UPyD supported the creation of a political constitution for the European Union in which EU member states transferred some powers, such as energy policy, fiscal policy, foreign policy, immigration, security, and defence, to the European Parliament with the aim of establishing a federal Europe, whose institutions would have had full legislative capacity. In addition, the magenta party favoured the abolition of the European Parliament's headquarters in Luxembourg and Strasbourg by concentrating all parliamentary activities in a single headquarters in Brussels. Similarly, UPyD advocated abolishing the intergovernmental European Council to promote the European Union's supranationality.

==== Immigration ====
UPyD wished to transfer immigration policy to the European Union as an exclusive competence. Accordingly, the magenta party asked the European Commission to include Ceuta and Melilla as full-fledged territories in the European customs area, thus making them part of the European Union's external borders. Therefore, UPyD wanted Frontex to open delegations in both cities and strengthen the Smart Borders Plan. The party supported the creation of a European green card, which would have provided legal immigrants with a joint residence and work permit in the European Union. UPyD stated that "controlled immigration is positive and necessary for Europe because of its demographic ageing" and called for a common immigration policy with strict respect for international law and human rights, which would have included not only admission and residence criteria for immigrants based on employment needs across the EU but also a European action protocol to keep illegal immigration at bay. On one hand, the magenta party supported increased immigration control by asserting the pressing need to protect the border fences in Ceuta and Melilla. UPyD thought that the Civil Guard should have stopped illegal immigrants and either repatriated them legally or returned them to the country from which they'd entered, without violating their human rights. Hence, UPyD rejected pushbacks and sought to prohibit using rubber bullets and razor wires as deterrents. On the other hand, the party stood up for giving asylum and humanitarian protection to people who fled from their nations because of armed conflicts, thereby implementing dissuasive sanctions on EU member states that refused to host refugees. Likewise, UPyD was favourable to allocating financial resources for democracy promotion in non-democratic countries and even endorsed military intervention if they were "insufficient to defend and protect human rights and to ensure that no one had to leave these countries". Finally, the magenta party believed there should not be any discrimination when accepting immigrants or refugees in Europe.

== Organization ==
=== Name ===
Rosa Díez—in a 2007 magazine interview prior to UPyD's registration in the Register of Political Parties and in a later 2007 television interview—and Mikel Buesa—at a 2007 party presentation—explained the origin of the three concepts which make up the party's name:

The word "union" referred to its unconditional defence of the union of Spain as a necessary condition for all Spaniards' equality before the law. The word "progress" referred to its progressivism, social liberal-rooted and respectful of civil liberties and freedom of choice. And the word "democracy" referred to its radical commitment to regenerating democracy from within the institutions.

Rosa Díez, Fernando Savater, Carlos Martínez Gorriarán and Juan Luis Fabo took charge of the choice of the party's name and the party's inscription into the Register of Political Parties. They opted for Union, Progress and Democracy because, as Rosa Díez explained, "there wasn't a party in Spain that had the necessary democratic pedagogy to defend these three concepts unashamedly. Indeed, there is a compelling case for union among Spaniards, a pressing need for progressive policies and still much work to be done before achieving a high-quality democracy".

=== Membership ===
At its Second Party Congress in November 2013, UPyD reported 6,165 registered members (down from an all-time high of 6,634 in 2011). In 2009, the party founded the think tank Fundación Progreso y Democracia (FPyD: Progress and Democracy Foundation), which has been presided over by UPyD spokesperson Rosa Díez.

=== Funding ===
Shortly after the party's creation, on 13 December 2007, UPyD held a press conference headed by Rosa Díez, Mikel Buesa, and Fernando Savater at which it denounced "evidently unequal" treatment by Spanish banks, which denied the party loans while forgiving debts held by the other political parties. Although party activity was funded by membership fees and small donations, it "could not continue this way" or contest an election with such meager resources. Therefore, the party leadership decided to offer €200, €500 and €1,000 bonds to fund the party's campaign for the 2008 general elections. The bonds, totaling €3 million–€5 million, were sold at party offices, on the internet and over a toll-free phone line. The party pledged to report the amount of the loans obtained and the state of its accounts, and intended to repay the money after the elections with institutional funding for parties with parliamentary representation.

== Election results ==
=== Cortes Generales ===
Cortes Generales
| Election | Leading candidate | Congress | | | Senate | | | Gov. |
| Election | Leading candidate | Votes | % | Seats | Votes | % | Seats | Gov. |
| 2008 | Rosa Díez | 306,079 | 1.2 (#6) | 1 / 350 | 691,695 | 1.0 (#8) | 0 / 208 | No |
| 2011 | Rosa Díez | 1,143,225 | 4.7 (#4) | 5 / 350 | 1,060,766 | 1.7 (#6) | 0 / 208 | No |
| 2015 | Andrés Herzog | 155,153 | 0.6 (#11) | 0 / 350 | 620,704 | 0.9 (#10) | 0 / 208 | — |
| 2016 | Gorka Maneiro | 50,247 | 0.2 (#12) | 0 / 350 | 186,127 | 0.3 (#10) | 0 / 208 | — |

=== European Parliament ===
European Parliament
| Election | Leading candidate | Votes | % | Seats | EP Group |
| 2009 | Francisco Sosa Wagner | 451,866 | 2.9 (#5) | 1 / 54 | NI |
| 2014 | Francisco Sosa Wagner | 1,022,232 | 6.5 (#5) | 4 / 54 | ALDE |
| 2019 | Luis Garicano | Within Citizens | | 1 / 59 | RE |

== Bibliography ==
1. Ávila López, Enrique (2015), Modern Spain, Understanding Modern Nations, ABC-CLIO, 427, ISBN 978-1-61069-601-2
2. Azagra Ros, Joaquin; Romero González, Joan (2012), Desde la margen izquierda, Universitat de València, 264, ISBN 978-84-370-8922-5
3. Bel i Queralt, Germà (2012), Infrastructure and the Political Economy of Nation Building in Spain, 1720-2010, Sussex Academic Press, 172, ISBN 978-1-84519-507-6
4. Bonet i Martí, Jordi (2015), "The 15-M: A Bet for Radical Democracy", in Kaldor, Mary; Selchow, Sabine; Murray-Leach, Tamsin (eds.), Subterranean Politics in Europe, Springer, pp. 119–140, ISBN 978-1-137-44147-8
5. Cabestan, Jean-Pierre; Pavković, Aleksandar (2013), Secessionism and Separatism in Europe and Asia: To Have a State of One's Own, Routledge, 246, ISBN 978-0-415-66774-6
6. Dorange, Monica (2013), Civilisation espagnole et hispano-américaine (in Spanish), Hachette Éducation, 400, ISBN 978-2-01-140215-8
7. Encyclopædia Britannica, Inc. (2014), Britannica Book of the Year 2014, Encyclopædia Britannica, Inc., 882, ISBN 978-1-62513-171-3
8. Field, Bonnie N.; Botti, Alfonso (2013), Politics and Society in Contemporary Spain: From Zapatero to Rajoy, Palgrave Macmillan, 256, ISBN 978-1-137-30663-0
9. Gillespie, Richard; Gray, Caroline (2015), Contesting Spain? The Dynamics of Nationalist Movements in Catalonia and the Basque Country, Routledge, 160, ISBN 978-1-317-40947-2
10. González-Chamorro García, Javier (2009), Bitarte: humanidades e historia del conflicto vasco-navarro: fueros, constitución y autodeterminación, Chamorro Ediciones, 495, ISBN 978-84-613-0711-1
11. Lansford, Tom (2014), Political Handbook of the World 2014, CQ Press, 1856, ISBN 978-1-4833-3327-4
12. Magone, José María (2009), Contemporary Spanish Politics, Taylor & Francis, 490, ISBN 978-0-415-42188-1
13. Maneiro Labayen, Gorka (2019), No apto para fanáticos, Letrame Grupo Editorial, 230, ISBN 978-84-17990-06-0
14. Miftari, Edita (2015), Gavrić, Saša; Bošnjak, Emina (eds.), Human Rights do not Recognize Political Ideology! Political Parties and the Human Rights of Lesbian, Gay, Bisexual and Transgender People (PDF), Human Rights Series, vol. 34, Sarajevski otvoreni centar, 57, ISBN 978-9958-536-25-0
15. Montero, José Ramón; Lago, Ignacio (2010), Elecciones generales 2008 (in Spanish), Centre for Sociological Research (CIS), 520, ISBN 978-84-7476-550-2
16. Muñoz Mendoza, Jordi (2012), La construcción política de la identidad española: ¿del nacionalcatolicismo al patriotismo democrático?, Colección Monografías (in Spanish), Centre for Sociological Research (CIS), 262, ISBN 978-84-7476-608-0
17. Painter, Anthony (2013), Left Without a Future?: Social Justice in Anxious Times, Policy Network Series, B.Tauris, 244, ISBN 978-1-78076-661-4
18. Ross, Christopher; Richardson, Bill; Sangrador-Vegas, Begoña (2013), Contemporary Spain, Routledge, 304, ISBN 978-1-4441-1699-1
19. Sánchez-Cuenca, Ignacio; Dinas, Elias (2016), Voters and Parties in the Spanish Political Space, Routledge, 184, ISBN 978-1-134-93326-6
20. Seoane Pérez, Francisco (2010), "Chapter 28: Spain", in Lodge, Juliet (ed.), The 2009 Elections to the European Parliament, EU Election Studies, Palgrave Macmillan, pp. 259–268, ISBN 978-0-230-29727-2
21. Ştefuriuc, Irina (2013), Government Formation in Multi-Level Settings: Party Strategy and Institutional Constraints, Palgrave Macmillan, 200, ISBN 978-1-137-30074-4
22. Ugarriza, Juan; Caluwaerts, Didier (2014), Democratic Deliberation in Deeply Divided Societies: From Conflict to Common Ground, Palgrave Macmillan, 248, ISBN 978-1-137-35781-6
23. Vidal, César; Jiménez Losantos, Federico (2012), La libertad tiene un precio (in Spanish), PLAZA & JANES EDITORES, 416, ISBN 978-84-01-34661-3
24. Viola, Donatella Maria (2015), Routledge Handbook of European Elections, Routledge, 824, ISBN 978-1-317-50363-7
