= Carlos Martínez Gorriarán =

Spanish politician

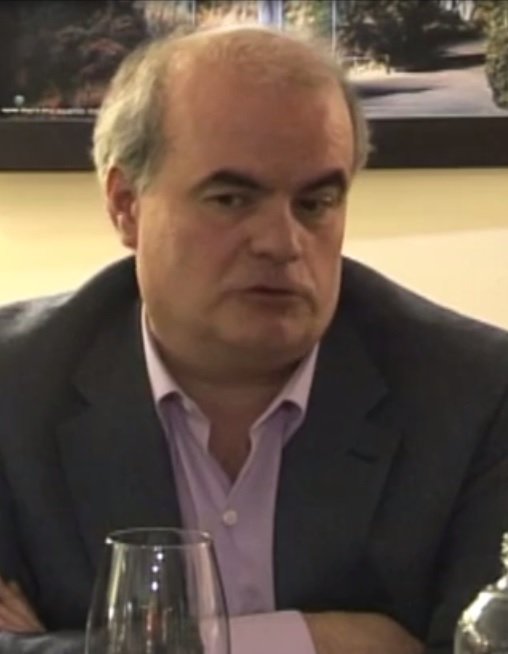

Member of Congress of Deputies
- Incumbent
- Assumed office November 2011

Personal details
- Born: 14 December 1959 (age 65); San Sebastián, Basque Country, Spain
- Political party: UPyD

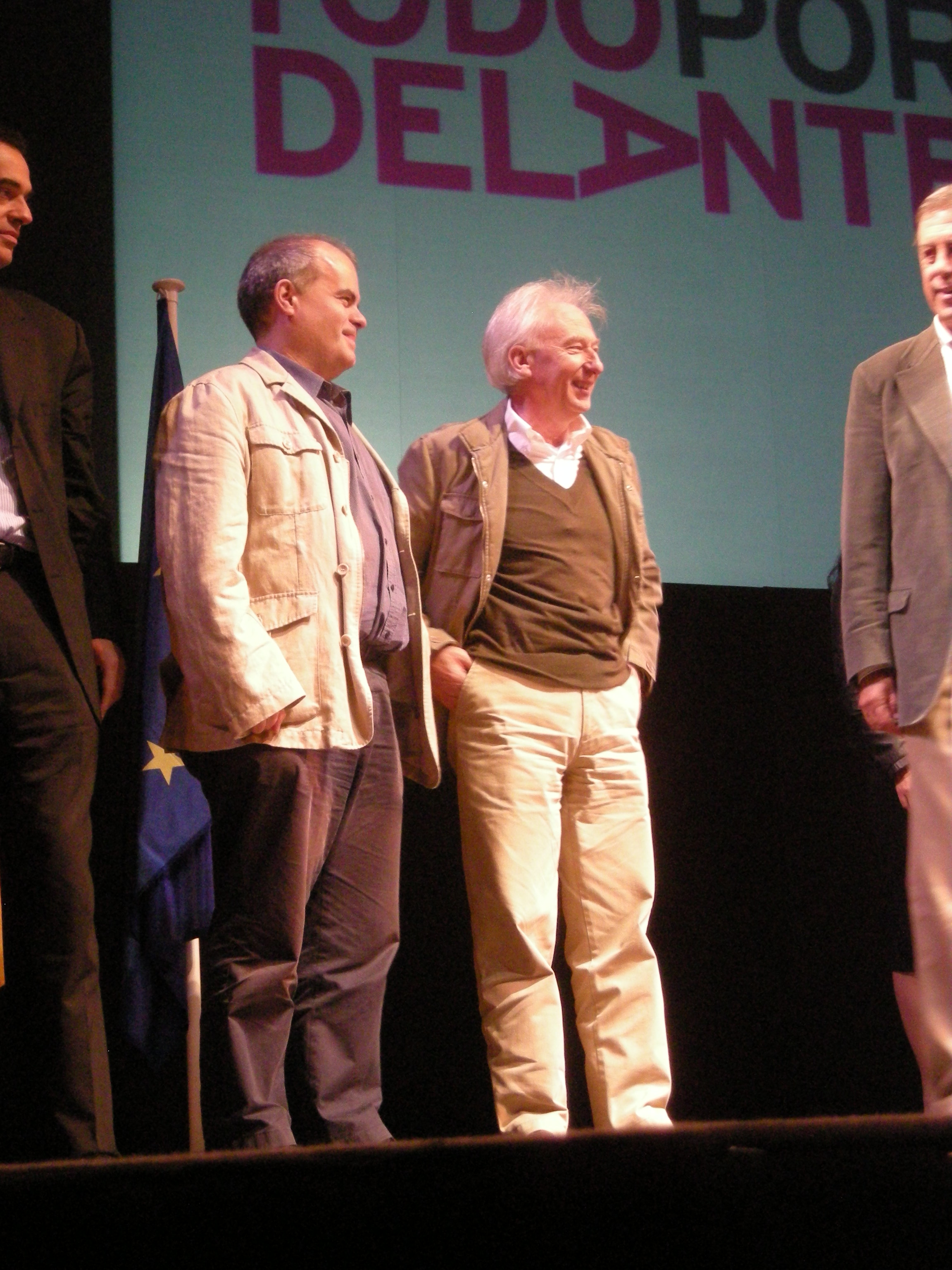
Carlos Martínez Gorriarán, in the left, next to Albert Boadella, at a Union, Progress and Democracy political event.

Carlos Martínez Gorriarán is a Spanish scholar, born in San Sebastián, Basque Country, Spain. After being a member of Marxist and Basque nationalist movements, he became one of the founding members and spokespersons of ¡Basta Ya! association and head of the Plataforma Pro from which the Union, Progress and Democracy (UPyD) party emerged in September 2007. In ¡Basta Ya! he was opposed to ETA, and also to the "obligatory nationalism" that he considered to be occurring in the Basque Country. He is a member of the Directing and Political counsels of the party.

He is a philosophy teacher in the Basque Country University. Since the 2011 Spanish General Election, he has been a deputy in the Spanish Congress representing the UPyD in Madrid Province.

== Works ==
- Movimientos cívicos (Turpial, 2008).
- Casa, provincia, rey: (para una historia de la cultura del poder en el Pais Vasco), (Alberdania, 1993).
- El arte vasco y el problema de la identidad, (Alberdania, 1995), (In collaboration with Imanol Agirre Arriaga).
- Oteiza, un pensamiento sin domesticar: ensayo, (San Sebastián; Baroja, D.L. 1989).

== Reviews ==
- Un libro de excepción, a review of Porque tengo hijos by Rosa Díez.

== Collaborations in collective works ==
- Fernando Savater y su obra: una actualización fundamental de la filosofía
  - en la obra Libertad de filosofar: ética, política y educación en la obra de Fernando Savater / coord. por Francisco Giménez Gracia, Enrique Ujaldón Benítez, 2007, pags. 119-144
- La crisis de la cultura en la época de la globalización
  - en la obra Los temas de nuestro tiempo / coord. por Fernando García de Cortázar Ruiz de Aguirre, 2002, pags. 115-140
- Sobre los orígenes y lógica del terrorismo en el País Vasco
  - en la obra Nacionalismo: pasado, presente y futuro / coord. por Antonio Hernández, Javier Espinosa, 2000, pags. 99-114

== Magazine articles ==
- Los Relatos de kolymá, de Varlam Shalámov: la tensión entre literatura y testimonio (sobre las propiedades cognitivas de la narración)
  - en Enrahonar: Quaderns de filosofía, Nº 38-39, 2007, pags. 101-115
- El terrorismo etarra: un final confuso
  - en Noticiero de las ideas, Nº. 25, 2006, pags. 72-80
- Thoreau, una vida bella y libre
  - en Revista de Libros, Nº. 103-104, 2005, pags. 45-46
- Los movimientos cívicos vascos frente a ETA
  - en Claves de la razón práctica, Nº 147, 2004, pags. 28-37
- Sobre la interpretación y la verdad en la filosofía contemporánea (I)
  - en Bitarte: Revista cuatrimestral de humanidades, Año 11, Nº. 32, 2004, pags. 73-101
- Sobre la interpretación y la verdad en la filosofía contemporánea (y II)
  - en Bitarte: Revista cuatrimestral de humanidades, Año 11, Nº. 33, 2004, pags. 21-43
  - Una izquierda antinacionalista
  - en Archipiélago: Cuadernos de crítica de la cultura, Nº 45, 2001, pags. 40-41
- La crisis de la democracia en el País Vasco
  - en Revista de Occidente, Nº 241, 2001, pags. 114-133
- La ruptura de la tregua de ETA
  - Claves de la razón práctica, Nº 100, 2000, pags. 22-30
- Los orígenes estéticos de las identidades modernas
  - en Claves de la razón práctica, Nº 80, 1998, pags. 6-13
- A propósito de la estética de la provocación
  - junto a Mikel Iriondo, en Recerca: revista de pensament i analisi, Nº. 5, 1995, pags. 193-204
- Esencias de una patria imaginaria: el nacionalismo vasco según Sabino Arana
  - en Claves de la razón práctica, Nº 43, 1994, pags. 44-55
- El artista como personaje y la unicidad del arte: el enfrentamiento Oteiza-Chillida
  - en Claves de la razón práctica, Nº 8, 1990, pags. 63-66
