= Maite Pagazaurtundúa =

Spanish politician, activist and writer

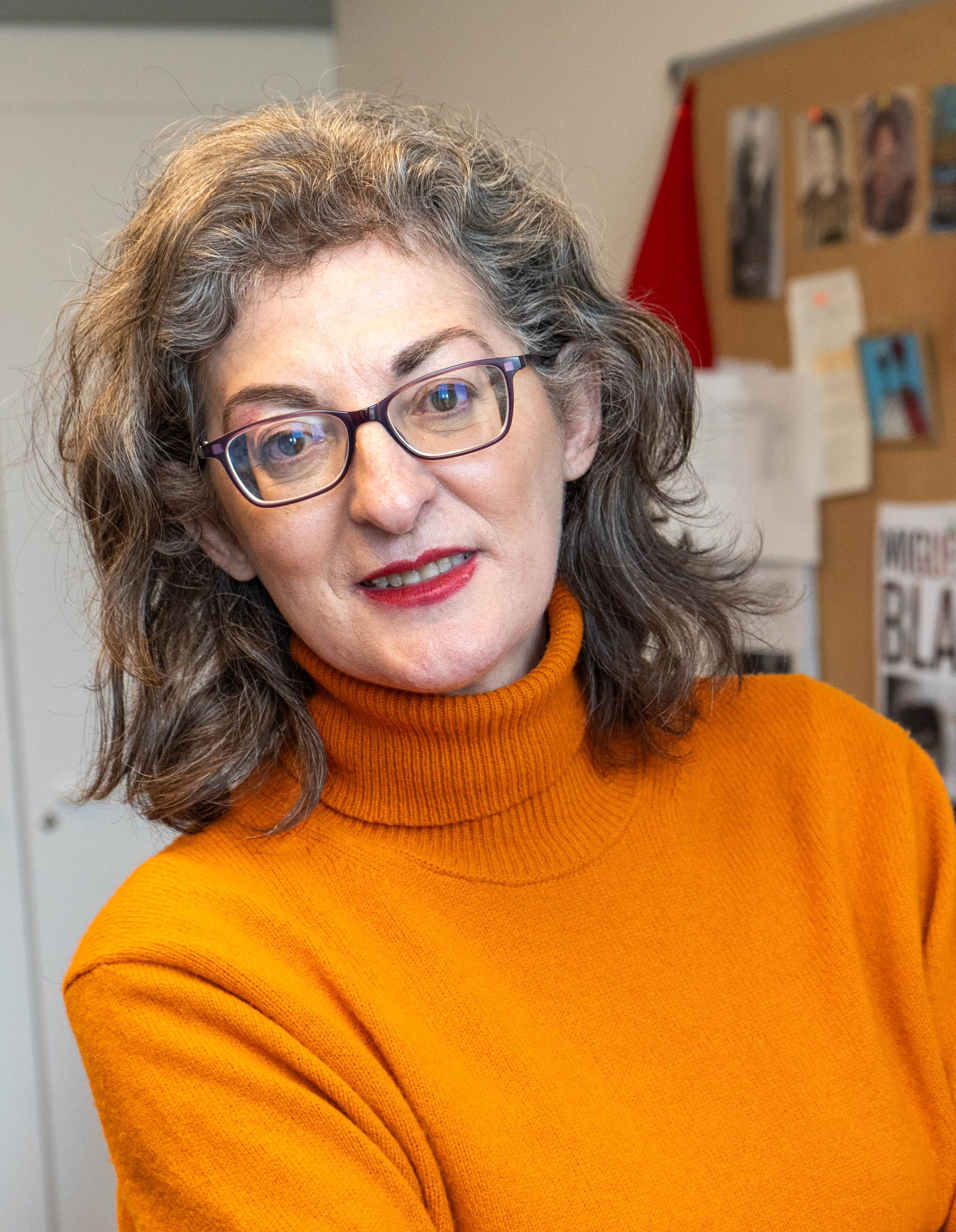
- Maite Pagazaurtundúa (MEP)

Member of the European Parliament
- In office 1 July 2014 – 15 July 2024
- Constituency: Spain

Personal details
- Born: 11 February 1965 (age 61) Hernani, Guipúzcoa, Francoist Spain
- Party: Spanish Socialist Workers' Party (1993–2005); Union, Progress and Democracy (2014–2020); Independent (since 2020)
- Occupation: Politician
- Awards: Sakharov Prize (2000); Order of Constitutional Merit (2003)

María Teresa "Maite" Pagazaurtundúa Ruiz (Spanish pronunciation: [ˈmajte paɣaθawɾtunˈdu.a]; born 11 February 1965), also known as Maite Pagaza, is a Spanish politician, activist and writer. For ten years, she was an MEP in the European Parliament, where she was a member of the political groups Renew Europe (2019–2024, as an independent member of Citizens) and ALDE (2014–2019, as a member of UPyD).

Her work has been focused on the defense of the Rule of Law and fundamental rights, as well as the fight against terrorism, foreign interference and harmful disinformation aimed at overthrowing democratic systems.

== Biography ==
She was born in Hernani in 1965. Her mother, Pilar Ruiz, was a war refugee and, after the assassination of her son, became a reference for freedom in the Basque Country. She is the youngest of three siblings. One of them, Joseba Pagazaurtundúa, was murdered by ETA in 2003 after nine years of threats, harassment and aggressions.

She studied at the Urumea Ikastola in Hernani (1968-1979) and graduated in Hispanic Philology and Basque Philology from the University of Deusto. She also studied Law in Basque at the UPV. She suffered recurring harassment and threats for her political stance, and after aggression in the faculty she was forced to stop attending in-person classes.

In 1996 she established her residence in San Sebastián to avoid the extreme risks in her hometown. After years of harassment, persecution and aggressions and, especially after the murder of her brother Joseba, she moved with her family, on police recommendation, out of the Basque Country in 2007. She is married and has two daughters.

She has participated in different social movements and initiatives for civil liberties in Spain and other countries. Se has spent decades fighting terrorism, hate speech and compulsory nationalism. The cost of her public stance in the front line against terrorists meant a high degree of harassment, threats and aggressions of physical and symbolic violence, forcing her to live under police escort for 13 years.

Her activity has been recognized with multiple awards such as the Sakharov Prize for Human Rights in 2000 - as a founding member of ¡Basta Ya!- or the Medal of the Order of Constitutional Merit in 2003. In 2005 she was part of a collective candidacy for the Nobel Peace Prize.

== Political career ==
Her political commitment began in the PSE-EE (PSOE), where she carried out various functions until she left the party due to deep disagreements with the leadership.

Between 1993 and 1998 she was a member of the Basque Parliament, where during the IV Legislature (1993 - 1994) she was a member of the Industry and Agriculture Commission, of the Education and Culture Commission and of the Human Rights Commission. In the V Legislature she was a member of the Education and Culture Committee, of the Incompatibilities Committee and vice-president of the Parliamentary Control Committee of EITB (the Basque Autonomous Community's public broadcast service). Likewise, she was president of the special commission against Drug Addictions. During her time in Basque politics she promoted that Basque hospitals apply protocols to promote breastfeeding.

She was also Secretary of Education and Culture of the PSE between 1993 and 1997, as well as advisor on Linguistic Policy to Fernando Buesa in the Department of Education of the Basque Government.

Between 1999 and 2007 she was a councilwoman and municipal spokesman for the PSE-EE in Urnieta, a town where she denounced several cases of corruption of the Basque Nationalist Party.

Her distancing from the PSOE occurred gradually when the PSOE embraced the theses of Jesús Eguiguren, who sought to bring the party closer to radical Basque nationalism. Subsequently this divide grew further, due to the anti-terrorist policy undertaken by the government of José Luis Rodríguez Zapatero and the PSOE, as well as the relations of Patxi López and the PSE-EE with the Basque nationalist and abertzale environment, showing her reticence towards the contacts maintained with Batasuna and the political negotiations with ETA and its environment, after the "so-called" permanent ceasefire announced by ETA. In May 2005, together with the widow of her brother Joseba Pagazaurtundúa, Estíbaliz Garmendia, the also socialist councilman in Miravalles, Nicolás Gutiérrez, the then PSOE MEP Rosa Díez, the philosopher Fernando Savater and the professor Mikel Iriondo, she sent an open letter to Patxi López reproaching him for the treatment given to María San Gil, of the Popular Party, in front of the EHAK parliamentarians, in his round of parliamentary contacts.

In November 2013, she participated in the II Congress of Unión Progreso y Democracia (UpyD). On February 5, 2014, she announced together with Rosa Díez that she would run for the European elections in the number 2 position on the UPyD list as an independent, just after Francisco Sosa Wagner, to whom she later dedicated a fisking.

After obtaining the seat of MEP, she joined UPyD on September 3, 2014. In October 2014, she was appointed spokesperson of the Union for Progress and Democracy delegation to the European Parliament, replacing Francisco Sosa Wagner.

Through an electoral collaboration agreement between UPyD and Ciudadanos, Maite Pagazaurtundúa joined as an independent in the number 2 position on the Ciudadanos list for the 2019 European Parliament elections, obtaining the seat of MEP and, while maintaining her affiliation to UPyD, joining the European Ciudadanos delegation within the Renew Europe political group.

== Activism ==
Maite Pagaza has participated in different social movements and initiatives for freedom both in Spain and in other countries. She has specialized in public work for civil liberties and human rights, as well as against terrorism and fanaticism. She has been active in civic associations in support of victims of terrorism in Spain.

=== ¡Basta Ya! ===
In 1998, together with other Basque intellectuals, politicians and citizens of diverse ideologies and occupations, she was one of the founders of ¡Basta Ya! (English: Enough is enough!), a Spanish citizens' initiative born with the triple purpose of opposing terrorism in any of its forms, supporting its victims and defending the rule of law, the Spanish Constitution and the Statute of Autonomy of the Basque Country. Other prominent members of the initiative were Fernando Savater, Joseba Pagazaurtundúa (murdered by ETA in 2003), Consuelo Ordóñez, Arcadi Espada, Carmen Iglesias, Javier Urguizu, Mikel Azurmendi, Iñaki Ezkerra, Agustín Ibarrola, María San Gil and Rosa Díez.

This initiative was characterized by bringing to the field of the defense of liberties and fight against terrorism novel and dynamic forms of activism and vindication: demonstrations, caravans, poster sticking, publication of the online magazine "Hasta aquí" (Up to here)...

The work of this group of citizens was recognized in 2000 by the Sakharov Prize for the defense of Human Rights awarded by the European Parliament, with ¡Basta Ya! being the first european citizens' association to receive this award. On December 13, at a solemn session in Strasbourg, the prize was collected by the philosopher Fernando Savater, the natural leader of the group, who explained the reason for the initiative:

¨We have taken to the streets and raised our voices because we are convinced that, when democracy is in danger, citizens cannot take refuge in their anonymity and meekly wait for everything to be resolved in the upper echelons of political power. "

== President of the Fundación de Víctimas del Terrorismo (Foundation for Victims of Terrorism) ==
She was the president of the Fundación de Víctimas del Terrorismo between 2005 and 2012, the year in which, after the change of government and the arrival of Mariano Rajoy (PP) to the Moncloa, she was replaced by María del Mar Blanco.

During her mandate she promoted the publication of the book ¨Vidas Rotas. Historia de los hombres, mujeres y niños víctimas de ETA¨, which chronicles all the murders committed by the terrorist group. The head of communications at the Foundation for Victims of Terrorism, Fernando Delgado, discovered that there were more than 300 unsolved cases of ETA murders. She hired a young lawyer to corroborate the data and led, with a group of victims, the constant work for more than two years to make the Audiencia Nacional (National Court) aware of the situation. Finally, the Prosecutor's Office of the Audiencia Nacional, with Javier Zaragoza at the head, produced the first official table of cases whose material authorship of murder was not resolved. Victims' associations, mainly COVITE and Dignidad y Justicia, have not stopped working since then on this pending matter.

== Joseba's mailbox ==
In February 2015, during the tribute to Joseba Pagazaurtundúa in Andoain on the twelfth anniversary of his assassination by ETA, his family installed a small white mailbox next to the sculpture by Agustín Ibarrola in memory of Joseba. The mailbox, known as Joseba's Mailbox, wants to give the inhabitants of Andoáin who cried out for ETA to kill the neighbors of the town who did not think like them, the opportunity to assume their responsibility. Pagazaurtundúa herself appealed to all those who felt challenged by the mailbox to deposit their letters -anonymous if they preferred- acknowledging their share of responsibility for the harassment and persecution of so many people.

The City Council wanted to remove the mailbox, but, faced with the arguments put forward by the family, did not dare to do so. Many people supported the continuity of the mailbox, among them the Ombudsman, Soledad Becerril. Finally, the opposition groups in the Andoain City Council supported the non-removal of the mailbox. In addition, the physical mailbox has subsequently been completed with a virtual one (http://www.elbuzondejoseba.org/) that has allowed the message for collective memory and against impunity to reach all corners of Spain.

The initiative was launched with letters from intellectuals such as Fernando Aramburu, Mario Vargas Llosa, Fernando Savater, Félix de Azúa or Arcadi Espada, as well as other figures such as Cayetana Álvarez de Toledo, Consuelo Ordóñez, Iñaki Arteta or Rosa Díez. Most of the letters were from citizens who wanted to show their support for the Pagazaurtundúa family and all the victims of terrorism. Some anonymous letters also arrived from repentant citizens, recognizing their part of responsibility for the persecution suffered by non-nationalists in the Basque Country.

== Member of European Parliament ==
Pagazaurtundúa was an active MEP in Brussels from 2014 to 2024, during two legislatures, the first for UPyD and the second for Ciudadanos. Her work continued to be committed to the defense of freedom, the fight against terrorism and radicalization or the promotion of human rights and justice, as well as the quality of the rule of law against the risks of illiberal populisms of all types.

Pagazaurtundúa has advocated building bridges between different political groups and finding pragmatic solutions to the challenges facing the European Union to advance the human rights, security and justice agenda in Europe. In addition, she has been an advocate for international cooperation and solidarity among EU member states.

Between 2014 and 2019 (VIII Legislature of the European Parliament), within the UPyD delegation, she was a member of the LIBE Committee on Civil Liberties, Justice and Home Affairs, the DROI subcommittee on Human Rights and the DEVE Committee on Development. Subsequently, she became a member of the AFCO Committee on Constitutional Affairs, where she worked in particular on European Citizenship issues. She was also a member of the Panama Papers Committee of Iniquiry (PANA) on Money Laundering and Tax Avoidance and Evasion and the Special Committee on Financial Crime and Tax Evasion and Avoidance (TAX3), as well as the Special Committee on Terrorism (TERR).

In 2019, Pagazaurtundúa ran in the European elections again, as an independent MEP on the lists of Ciudadanos Europa. Between 2019 and 2024, she continued her work in the European Parliament as vice-chair of the Committee on Civil Liberties, Justice and Home Affairs and member of the Committee on Constitutional Affairs. In addition, she became a member of the Committee on Petitions (PETI) and the Special Committee on Foreign Interference in Democratic Processes (INGE).

=== Combating hate crimes ===
In the framework of her parliamentary activity, she has led as rapporteur the report of the European Parliament on the Extending the list of EU crimes to hate speech and hate crime , which urges the Council to adopt a decision to include hate speech and hate crimes in the list of criminal offences referred to in Article 83(1) TFEU.

=== European Citizenship ===
Pagazaurtundúa has also been rapporteur for the report on the Implementation of Treaty provisions on EU citizenship, which advocates for putting the citizen at the heart of the system by tackling the remaining obstacles to the full exercise of the major freedoms and EU citizenship.

=== Committee on Petitions ===
As a member of the Committee on Petitions, the only parliamentary committee to which European citizens can address their complaints and grievances, Pagazaurtundúa has promoted and been part of several delegations of MEPs who have traveled to Spain to investigate situations of violation of civil liberties and fundamental rights, which have led to condemnations by the European Parliament in its reports:

- Report following the fact-finding visit to Spain from 3 to 5 November 2021, in relation to 379 still unsolved murders committed by the terrorist group ETA, in which the Parliament urges that all possible legal means be taken to prevent these crimes from becoming time-barred.
- Report following the fact-finding visit to Spain from 11 to 13 April 2022 on cases of child sexual abuse in the Balearic Islands, which was conducted in order to clarify and gather information on the case of sexually exploited minors in the Balearic Islands, under the guardianship of the Institute of Social Affairs of Mallorca, under the Consell de Mallorca.
- Report following the fact-finding visit to Catalonia (Spain) from 18 to 20 December 2023 with the aim of assessing in situ the language immersion model in Catalonia, its impact on families moving to and residing in the region as well as on multilingualism and non-discrimination and the principle of the Rule of Law, in which it is denounced that in Catalonia the presence of Spanish in education is residual, the best interest of the child is not taken into account, court rulings are not complied with and families are forced to demand in court rights that have already been recognized, even subjecting them to harassment campaigns.

=== Rule of Law in Spain ===
Pagazaurtundua has carried out work to protect the rule of law and the separation of powers as a European matter, defending the independence of the judiciary on the basis that it is the backbone of the rule of law, since it is a precondition for guaranteeing effective judicial protection and avoiding arbitrariness and abuses by any government or public power. She has supported Spanish judges and prosecutors who have denounced pressure and explicit threats from the central and autonomous Catalan political power.

=== Russian interference in Catalonia ===
Pagazaurtundúa has denounced before the European Union the Russian connections with Catalan secessionism. Her work prompted the European Parliament to denounce in the INGE Committee reports the "close and regular contacts between Russian officials and representatives of a group of Catalan secessionists in Spain", requesting "an in-depth investigation" and noting that these "form part of Russia's broader strategy to seize any and every opportunity to manipulate the discourse in order to promote destabilization". In addition, the Parliament also requested a mandate from the European Centre of Excellence for Countering Hybrid Threats (Hybrid CoE) to conduct a study of the case of Russian interference in Catalonia.

=== Support for civil and political liberties in Venezuela ===
In November 2015, she promoted the manifesto "Intellectuals for Venezuela", which gathered more than a hundred supporters from intellectuals of the caribbean country to demand that the regime of Nicolás Maduro accept the result of the elections. To do so, she joined intellectuals and writers such as Mario Vargas Llosa, Alberto Barrera Tyszka, Juan Carlos Méndez Guédez, Doménico Chiape, Oscar Lucien.

== Initiatives for the 2oth anniversary of ¡Basta Ya! ==
In 2020, on the occasion of the 20th anniversary of ¡Basta ya!, Pagaza launched the website ¡Basta ya! 2020, which includes the history of this group of free citizens, as well as a photographic exhibition by Justy García Koch, an archive of the magazine "Hasta aquí", photographs, videos...

In January 2022, she organized at the European Parliament a commemoration of ¡Basta ya!, which included the installation of the "tunnel of hate", curated by José Ibarrola, a sensory experience where the sound of hatred reproduced the oppression and harassment of exclusionary ethno-nationalism that terrorized for decades the streets of the Basque Country and Navarra and some brave citizens who rise with the Sakharov Prize of the European Parliament.

In 2024, Maite Pagaza's parliamentary office produced the documentary "¡Basta ya!: Resistencia democrática. Conversaciones en la librería Lagun", made by Juan Vadillo. The work was premiered in Madrid on January 26, 2024.

== Writer and columnist ==
She has published regularly since the nineties in the Spanish and international press. She collaborated for several years in Grupo VOCENTO and in the magazine Yo Dona.

She has written and published several books:

- Los Pagaza. Historia de una familia vasca (Temas de Hoy, 2004), a biographical work depicting the story of her family and how they lived through her brother's murder. The author makes a portrait of Basque society in the face of violent harassment of non-nationalists.
- El viudo sensible y otros secretos (Seix Barral, 2005), a compilation of short stories.
- Aralda (Espasa, 2010)
- Operación Cochinillo (Editorial Espasa, 2014), a satirical work about corruption which takes place in Segovia, Spain.
- Lluvia de fango (Confluencias, 2016): a compilation of her press articles.

== Courses and seminars ==
Throughout her career, she has participated as a speaker in various courses and seminars at spanish and foreign universities, including the Universidad Pontificia de Comillas, Universidad CEU San Pablo, Universidad Complutense and the Spanish Diplomatic School. She was a lecturer from 2009 to 2013 in the courses of the Spanish Armed Forces General Staff at CESEDEN (Centro Superior de Estudios de la Defensa Nacional).

== Acknowledgments and awards ==
She has received numerous awards and acknowledgments for her work:

- Sakharov Prize (2000): as a member of the civic platform ¡Basta Ya! awarded by the plenary session of the European Parliament.
- Medal of the Order of Constitutional Merit (2003): awarded by the Order of Constitutional Merit.
- López de Lacalle Foundation Award (2009): for her service to victims and her civic commitment.
- Cross for Police Merit with Red Distinctive (2012) in honorary title, for her services and merits.
- Corona de Esther Prize (2017): awarded by Centro Sefarad-Israel.
- Enrique Ruano Casanova pro Human Rights Award (2018): for her activism in favor of the victims of terrorism, granted by the Complutense University of Madrid.
- Henneo Award (2018): for her defense of freedoms and human rights granted by Heraldo de Aragón.
- Tolerance Award (2018): awarded by the Asociación para la Tolerancia.

== ANNEXES: Maite Pagaza's initiatives ==
From her office in the European Parliament, Pagaza has carried out different initiatives, studies, reports and audiovisual content pieces.

=== Resistance against ETA ===
Report "Democracia y Libertad" (2014) published in Spanish, English and French, and distributed among the 751 Members of the European Parliament.

Report "Los profesores de la UPV-EHU frente a ETA" (2015), on the persecution by ETA and its environment of non-nationalist professors in the Basque Public University.

Report "Homenajes. Enaltecimiento del terrorismo y doble victimación en Euskadi" (2019) on the extolling of ETA terrorists for their criminal past.

Report "Anormalidad democrática en el post-terrorismo. Agradecimientos a ETA y homenajes a etarras en el PV" on the acknowledgements to ETA on the occasion of the cessation of its terrorist activity.

Report "Response to Thomas Lacoste". Response to the documentary "Basque Country and Freedom, a long road to peace" by Thomas Lacoste. A documentary about the "long road to peace" in which the victims are invisible, where both the dead and the wounded, kidnappings, extortions, harassment and persecutions are ignored.

Report "Movilización etnonacionalista y prácticas inciviles en España" The Europol report on the terrorism situation in the EU 2020, in its section on ethno-nationalist and separatist terrorism, states that the main incidents of this nature took place in the United Kingdom (Republican Dissidents) and in Spain (ETA and its aftermath).

Cover of Black and White Paper on Terrorism in Europe

=== Black and White Paper on Terrorism in Europe ===
The first comprehensive compilation of data on victims of terrorism killed within the European Union and Europeans killed in attacks in third countries. This book shows, through infographics, the extent of terrorism in Europe in its different forms. As the book states, "the number of people killed in attacks in the EU and Europeans killed by terrorist actions in the rest of the world amounts to 1,790 victims in the period 2000-2017. Fifteen European countries have been directly hit by attacks, with a death toll of 740. In addition, 26 third countries have seen a total of 1,050 Europeans killed on their territory in these years." The Black and White Book has a dual and complementary approach. On the one hand, it selects qualitative contributions, with expert and diverse reflections on the phenomenon of terrorism, and on the other hand, it compiles specific data on the victims of terrorism in Europe and that has affected Europeans in the world since 2000.

=== Defense of the Rule of Law in Spain ===
- Report "Xenofobia y fanatismo del presidente autonómico de Cataluña Quim Torra", Report on Quim Torra, condemning "exclusionary" comments and articles by the president of the Generalitat of Catalonia.
- Report "Mossos d’esquadra, la policía política", Report on the Provincial Information Brigade of the National Police of Catalonia, on the monitoring carried out by the Mossos d'Esquadra to people opposed to the secession process in Catalonia.
- Report "Vulneración de los derechos del niño y ataques a la diversidad en las aulas", Report sent to the Ombudsman, in which cases of "persecution of children who do not accept the precepts of nationalism" in classrooms in Catalonia are denounced.
- Report "Informe CDRs", a report on the birth and organization of the CDRs, their most significant actions and the support they receive.
- Video ¨The exclusion of Spanish in education in Catalonia¨ (2023).
- Videos ¨Russian interference in the Catalan secessionist movement¨ in which information is gathered about Russian connections with the Catalan independence movement, in order to advance investigations into the Kremlin's interference aimed at destabilizing European societies.
- Video ¨Spain 2024: Pact of professionals in defense of the Rule of Law¨ (2024). The main organizations of judges, prosecutors, lawyers, justice, tax and local administration personnel, police forces and other professional groups defend the Professional Pact in defense of the rule of law following the progress of the amnesty law and the deterioration of the separation of powers and the independence of the judiciary.

=== A Cartography of hatred ===
In 2021, Pagaza published the study " A Cartography of hatred", a quantitative and qualitative study that analyzes incidents and crimes with a background motivation of prejudice, intolerance, discrimination and hate produced between 2015-2021 in France, Germany, Hungary, Italy, Poland and Spain. The aim of this study, published both in print and website, is to contribute to the realization of a heat map constituting a wake-up call on the growing phenomena of hate.

=== European Citizenship Statute ===
The European Citizenship Statute compiles and updates the fundamental rights and freedoms common to all citizens of the Union, in order to strengthen the current European citizenship and improve the practical application of the rights associated with it, placing citizenship at the center.

=== Good Practices and Transparency for Police ===
- European Police Code of Good Practices and Transparency (2024). An initiative to establish a set of minimum standards for police organization and performance, a set of guiding principles that contribute to the creation of more transparent, more democratic, more efficient policing models and thus add public value to national and European communities.
- Video "Security Forces and Corps in the 21st Century: the protagonists speak out¨ (2024)", in which European police forces defend their demands and claim to be able to work safely and efficiently, including the recognition at European level of this work as a risk profession.

=== The risks of addiction to social networks and digital platforms ===
- Video ¨Do social media platforms hide an addictive business model for minors?¨ (2024). For years, Pagazaurtundua has warned about the systemic risk of addiction due to the business model of social networks and demanded more transparency from technological platforms about their algorithms. In this video, different experts on networks and addictions call for measures to be taken by legislators regarding a business that is based on keeping users glued to the network, and which has particularly harmful effects for minors.
