= Fernando Maura Barandiarán =

Spanish lawyer, politician and writer

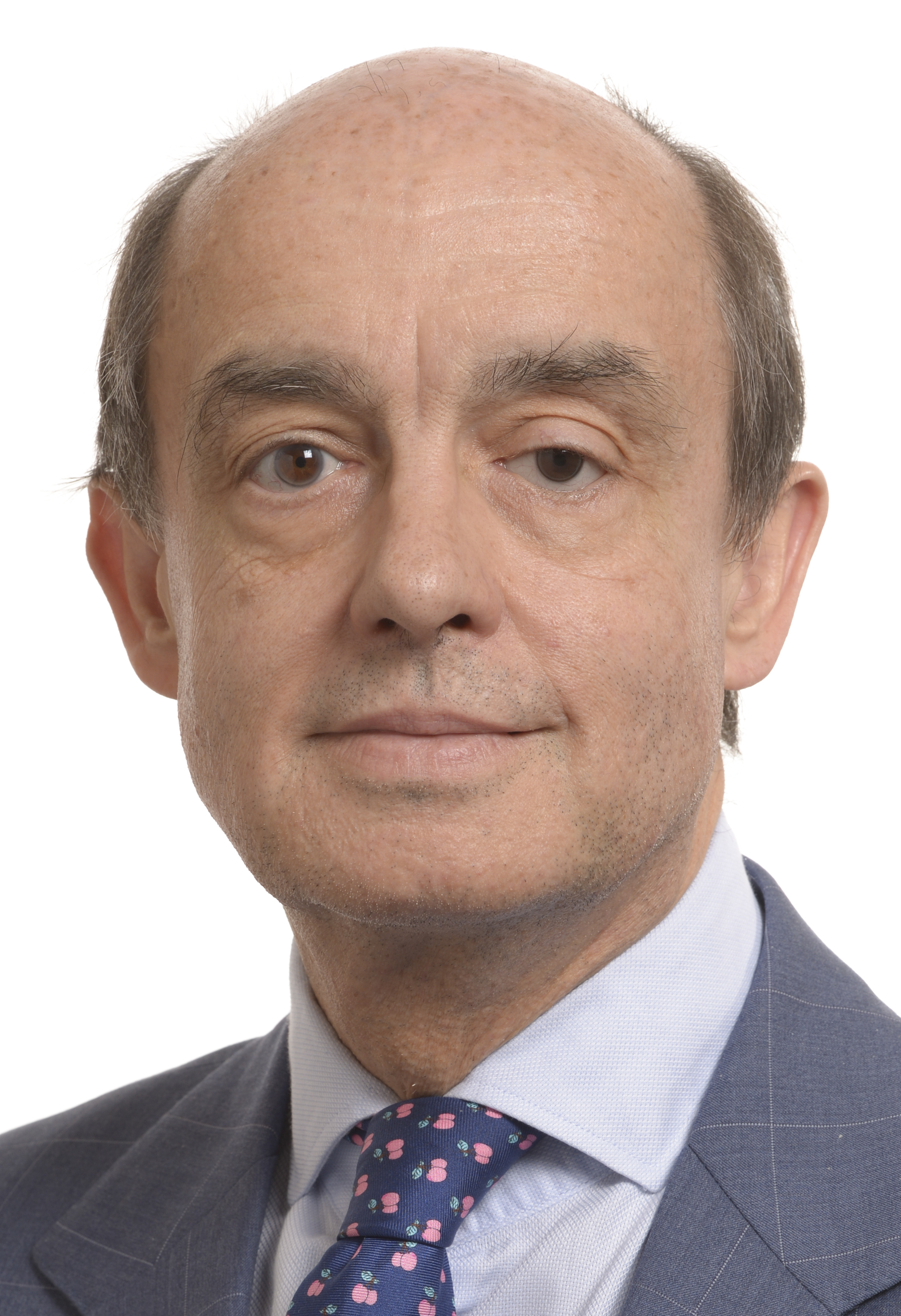

Member of the Spanish Parliament
- Incumbent
- Assumed office 2016
- Constituency: Spain

Member of the European Parliament
- In office 2014–2015

Basque Parliament
- Incumbent
- Assumed office 1990

Personal details
- Born: April 1955 (age 71) Bilbao, Spain
- Party: Union, Progress and Democracy
- Other political affiliations: People's Party
- Occupation: Politician

Fernando Maura Barandiarán is a Spanish lawyer, politician and writer.

== Early life and education ==
Fernando Maura was born in Bilbao in April 1955, he is the great-grandson of Antonio Maura, President during the reign of Alfonso XIII. He studied law at the University of Deusto, specializing in economic law.

In 1980, while studying for the Diplomatic School, the separatist group ETA assassinated his father's associate Enrique Aresti Urien and so Fernando had to return to Bilbao to help with the family business, the insurer named "La Union y el Fenix". Subsequently, he was elected as a member of the board of management of the "Bureau International des Producteurs d'Assurances et des Reassurances", based in Paris; and as regional director of "La Union y el Fenix" in the Basque Country.

== Political career ==
From 1983 to 1987 Fernando Maura served as a councilor in the city of Bilbao. In 1989, together with Jaime Mayor Oreja, he took part in the foundation of the People's Party in the Basque Country and became its Secretary-general until 1992.

In 1990 Maura was elected as a member of the Basque Parliament where he was the spokesman of the areas of Finance, Employment, Social Affairs and Culture until 2007, year in which he decided to leave the People's Party and founded, together with other Spanish politicians, a new party called Unión, Progreso y Democracia. Since then, he became the Territorial Council spokesman of the party in the Basque Country, the coordinator of the international area and a member of the Board of Directors until August 2014.

=== Member of the European Parliament, 2014–2015 ===
In May 2014, Maura was elected as a Member of the European Parliament. He served on the Committee on Culture and Education and the delegation to the Parliamentary Assembly of the Mediterranean from 2014 until 2015. He was also one of six vice-presidents of the Alliance of Liberals and Democrats for Europe Group (ALDE), under the leadership of chairman Guy Verhofstadt.

In addition to this, Maura served as vice-chair of the Delegation for relations with the Maghreb countries and the Arab Maghreb Union and substitute in the Committee on Foreign Affairs, Subcommittee on Security and Defence and the Delegation to the ACP–EU Joint Parliamentary Assembly.

In 2015, Maura and Dita Charanzová nominated the Democratic Unity Roundtable (MUD), a Venezuelan election coalition formed to unify the opposition to president Hugo Chávez, for the Sakharov Prize for Freedom of Thought.

=== Member of the Spanish Parliament, since 2016 ===
In addition to his role in parliament, Maura has been serving as member of the Spanish delegation to the Parliamentary Assembly of the Council of Europe since late 2016. As member of Ciudadanos, he is part of the Alliance of Liberals and Democrats for Europe group. In that capacity, he is a member of the Committee on Legal Affairs and Human Rights. He was also a member of a cross-party delegation to observe the 2017 parliamentary elections in Albania.

== Other activities ==
Maura is also the patron of the Foundation of Freedom and director of the liberal company "El Sitio". He was appointed as vice-president of Prisoners Defenders International in September 2021. He has been involved in the citizens' initiative ¡Basta Ya!, and has collaborated with the Spanish journals El Correo, El Mundo and ABC, among others. Moreover, he has published several novels, a book-witness, a collaborative trial, as well as articles in various newspapers and magazines.

In addition, he holds the following other positions:

- Member of the Board of Trustees of Fundación Progreso y Democracia
- Member of the Royal Basque Society of Friends of the Country
- Member of the Royal Brotherhood of the knights of San Fernando

== Literary work and publications ==
- Conflicto en Chemical, Burguete, 1993.
- Últimos días de Agosto, Burguete, 1995.
- El doble viaje de Agustín Ceballos, Burguete, 1999.
- Sin perder la dignidad: diario de un parliamentario vasco del PP, Temas de Hoy, 2001.
- Bilbao en gris, Hiria, 2003.
- Lakua: kosas ke okurrieron, Sepha, 2012.
