= Oncins =

Oncins is a surname. Notable persons with that name include:

- Albert Boadella Oncins (born 1943), Spanish actor and playwright
- Eduardo Oncins (born 1964), Brazilian tennis player
- Eric Oncins, Brazilian pickleball player
- Jaime Oncins (born 1970), Brazilian tennis player
