= Fernando Savater =

Spanish philosophy professor and author

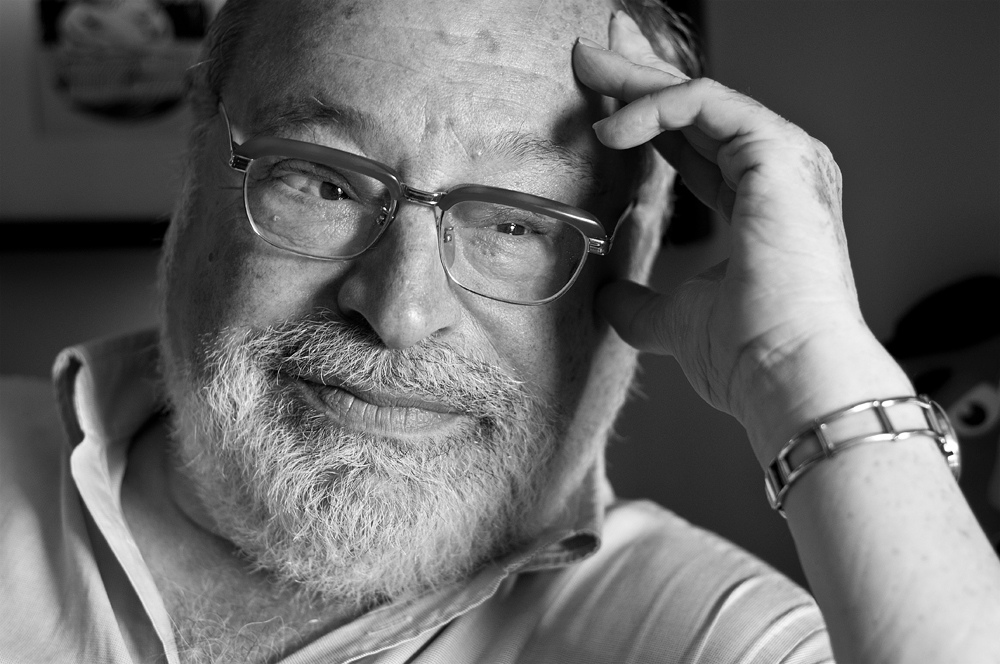
- Portrait of Spanish philosopher Fernando Savater for the magazine Jot Down
- Born: Fernando Fernández-Savater Martín; 21 June 1947 (age 79); San Sebastián, Basque Country, Spain

Education
- Education: Universidad Complutense de Madrid
- Website: www.fernandosavater.com

Fernando Fernández-Savater Martín (born 21 June 1947 at Basque city of San Sebastián) is a Spanish philosopher, essayist and author.

== Early years and career ==
Born in San Sebastián, he was an Ethics professor at the University of the Basque Country for over a decade. Presently he is a Philosophy professor at the Complutense University of Madrid. He has won several accolades for his literary work, which covers issues as diverse as contemporary ethics, politics, cinema and literary studies. In 1990, Savater and columnist and publisher, Javier Pradera, founded the magazine, Claves de Razón Práctica.

In November 2012 he was awarded the prestigious Octavio Paz Prize of Poetry and Essay.

In that same year 2012, with issue number 222 (May–June 2012), he became Editor in Chief of "Claves de razón práctica" (Spanish for "Keys for Practical Reason"), a critical thought and cultural crusading review founded by Javier Pradera in 1990, thus giving start to a second era of this prestigious publication, with an editorial board composed of Basilio Baltasar, Francisco Calvo Serraller, Joaquín Estefanía, Carlos García Gual, Santos Juliá and José María Ridao.

== Political activism ==
Savater founded a political party currently disbanded called Unión, progreso y democracia (Spanish for Union, Progress and Democracy and often shortened as UPyD) with former socialists MP Rosa Díez, Albert Boadella and Mario Vargas Llosa in order to oppose different nationalist movements in Spanish mainstream politics.

Savater was one of the intellectuals and politicians who endorsed the 2012 manifesto of the "reconversion.es" platform vouching for a recentralization of the country, and considered a precursor of the far-right Vox. In 2018, Savater adhered to the manifesto Manifiesto por la historia y la libertad promoted by Francisco Franco National Foundation, decrying the Law of Historical Memory.

He has taken an active part in several organizations engaged with peace in the Basque Country and against terrorism and Basque nationalism, such as Movimiento por la Paz y la No Violencia, Gesto por la Paz, Foro Ermua, and currently ¡Basta Ya!

== Personal life ==
Savater is also known as a philosophy popularizer, TV host, lecturer and for his political activism.

He defines himself as an agnostic, an anglophile and a defender of the Enlightenment in the Voltaire tradition.

== Bibliography ==
- Nihilismo y acción (Nihilism and Action) (1970)
- Ensayo sobre Cioran (Essay on Cioran) (1974)
- Panfleto contra el Todo (A Proclamation against Everything) (1978)
- Criaturas del aire (1979);
- Caronte aguarda (Charon Awaits) (1981)
- La tarea del héroe (The Task of the Hero) (1981)
- Invitación a la ética (An Invitation to Ethics) (1982)
- La infancia recuperada (Childhood Recovered) (1983)
- Sobre vivir (On Living -and Surviving) (1983)
- Las razones del antimilitarismo y otras razones (The Reasons for Antimilitarism and Other Reasons) (1984)
- El contenido de la felicidad (The Contents of Happiness) (1986)
- Ética como amor propio (Ethics as Self-Esteem) (1988)
- Ética para Amador (Ethics for Amador) (1991)
- Política para Amador (Politics for Amador) (1992)
- Sin contemplaciones (Straight Talk) (1993)
- El jardín de las dudas (Garden of Doubts) (1993)
- Despierta y lee (Wake Up and Read) (1998)
- Las preguntas de la vida (The Questions of Life) (1999)
- Perdonen las molestias (Sorry for Disturbing) (2001)
- El Gran Laberinto (The Great Labyrinth) (2005)
- Ética de Urgencia (Importunate Ethics) (2012)
