= Javier Pradera =

Spanish anti-Franco activist, journalist, political analyst and publisher

- Born: April 28, 1934; San Sebastián
- Died: November 20, 2011 (aged 77)

Francisco Javier Pradera Gortázar (28 April 1934 – 20 November 2011) was a Spanish anti-Franco activist, journalist, political analyst and publisher. Pradera was a journalist and columnist for El País, based in Madrid. Pradera worked as an editorial writer at El País from 1976 to 1986. His first piece for El País was published on 16 May 1976. He remained an El País columnist and editorial board member from 1986 until his death in 2011. Outside of El País, Pradera worked as the director of the publishing firm, Alianza Editorial, and founded the publishing house, Siglo XXI.

Pradera was born on 28 April 1934 in San Sebastián, Gipuzkoa. His grandfather, Víctor Pradera Larumbe, a politician who founded the Bloque Nacional, now a defunct conservative party, was killed by anarchists in 1936. His father, Javier Pradera, was also assassinated just one day after his grandfather.

Pradera completed his law degree as a cum laude from Complutense University. He found work within the legal department of the Franco's era Spanish Air Force. However, Pradera was arrested in February 1956 for taking part in anti-Franco university protests, which cost him his job. Pradera turned from his family's politically conservative traditions and joined the Communist Party of Spain, which was banned during the Franco era. However, he left the part in 1964 following the expulsions of Jorge Semprún and Fernando Claudín in a party purge.

Pradera and Fernando Savater, a Basque philosopher, co-founded the Claves de Razón Práctica magazine in 1990.

Javier Pradera died on 20 November 2011 at the age of 77. His last column for El País was published on the same day as his death. The piece, which he titled Al borde del abismo (On the brink of the abyss), warned against a potential interim government for Spain if the European sovereign debt crisis worsened.
