= Albert Boadella =

Catalan actor and director

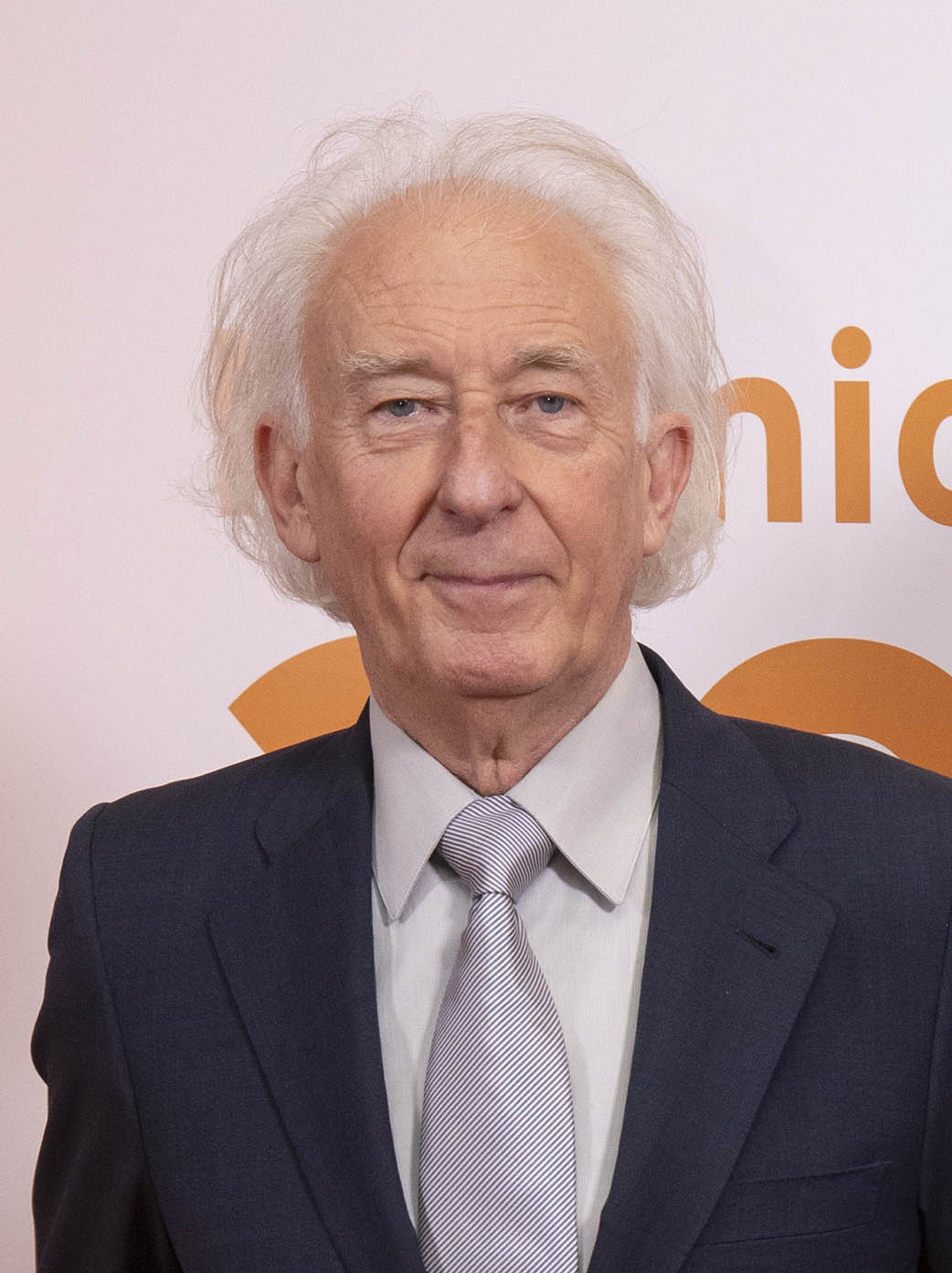
- Boadella in 2019
- Born: July 29, 1943 (age 83); Barcelona, Spain
- Education: University of Barcelona
- Occupations: Actor, playwright
- Notable work: La Torna, Ubú President, ¡Viva Tabarnia!
- Awards: Premio Espasa de Ensayo (2007); Premio HazteOir.org (2019)

Albert Boadella Oncins (born 30 July 1943, in Barcelona) is a Spanish actor and playwright. He was one of the founding members of the Els Joglars theatre company, and its director from 1962 to 2012.

== Biography ==
Boadella studied dramatic art at the Institut del Teatre of Barcelona, at the Centre Dramatique de l'Est (Strasbourg) and corporal expression in Paris. As a student, he was part of Italo Riccardi's mime artist company.

In 1962, when he was only 19 years old, Boadella founded the theater company Els Joglars in Barcelona. The company was founded as a partnership with his colleagues Carlota Soldevila and Anton Font. Boadella would go on to develop his entire career as an actor, director and playwright under Els Joglars, writing more than thirty plays. His works tended to have a strong critical and satirical charge, especially in relation to perceived established powers, most frequently the Catholic Church. The critical tendencies of Boadella's works have led to controversies and conflicts with political authorities of different sign.

On 2 December 1977, after the release of La Torna, a satire of the life and execution of Heinz Chez, Boadella was imprisoned and subjected to a court-martial for the alleged offense of insulting the Army. The day before the hearing, he staged a spectacular escape from prison and took refuge in France.

Returning to Spain in the 1980s, he continued to create controversy with works such as Teledeum and Ubú president, which presented strong criticisms of Jordi Pujol and Salvador Dalí.

Apart from his theatrical curriculum, he has created and directed several television programs for different networks, and is the author of the books El Rapto de Talía (Note: The kidnapping of Talía) (DeBolsillo, 2000) and the memoir Memorias de un bufón (Note: Memoirs of a Jester) (Espasa-Calpe, 2001).

In 2003, he wrote the screenplay for and directed the film ¡Buen viaje, Excelencia!, a caricature of the last months of general Francisco Franco.

A great fan of bullfighting, and a public defender of the art of cúchares, Boadella has frequently placed the emotion of the bullfighting ritual above the rest of the arts. In December 2006, he premiered a work in Madrid in the format of a medieval debate entitled Controversy of the bull and the bullfighter, where reasons for and against the tradition alternate. His support for bullfighting has earned him the admiration of important figures in bullfighting, including José Tomás and Enrique Ponce, as well as criticism from anti-bullfighting sectors. In his memoirs, Boadella rebuffs the criticism of the latter groups:

No one has insulted me with more pleasure, viciousness and fanaticism than those who practice anti-bullfighting with their beatific antiviolent mask. But [...] the more pressure they deploy, the same as the Christians of Ancient Rome, more vigor and sense will acquire the bullfighting. Some popes and even powerful monarchs tried to finish with the bulls. The result is clear: there is a growing number of farms and it is better bullfought.

— Albert Boadella, Adiós Cataluña, 2007, p. 280

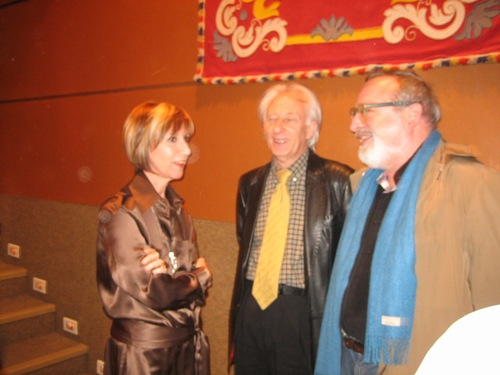
Ciutadans de Catalunya in Madrid: Rosa Díez, Albert Boadella and Fernando Savater.

In September 2007, his memoir Adiós Cataluña. Crónicas de amor y de guerra (Note: Goodbye Catalonia: Chronicles of love and war) won the 24th Premio Espasa de Ensayo awards. At the presentation of the book, he explained that his goodbye to Catalonia was not metaphorical, but real: he announced that he would not work again in Catalonia before the end of the boycott suffered by his works in the region.

Since 2009, he has been the artistic director of the Teatros del Canal, following an offer from the President of the Community of Madrid, Esperanza Aguirre.

On 11 September 2012, he announced that the management of the company Els Joglars would be transferred to Ramon Fontserè. The announcement was made during the presentation of the 2012-13 season of the Compañía Nacional de Teatro Clásico, with which Els Joglars has produced Miguel de Cervantes' play The Dialogue of the Dogs. (Note: El coloquio de los perros)

In December 2012, he was awarded the Alfonso Ussía awards in the category of Person of the Year, together with Arturo Fernández.

In 2017, he received the 20th Pepe Isbert National Theater Awards, granted by Amigos de los Teatros Históricos de España, (Note: Friends of the Historical Theaters of Spain) and the 13th Joaquín Vidal national university awards in bullfighting, awarded by the Círculo Taurino Universitario Don Luis Mazzantini.

== Ideological trajectory ==
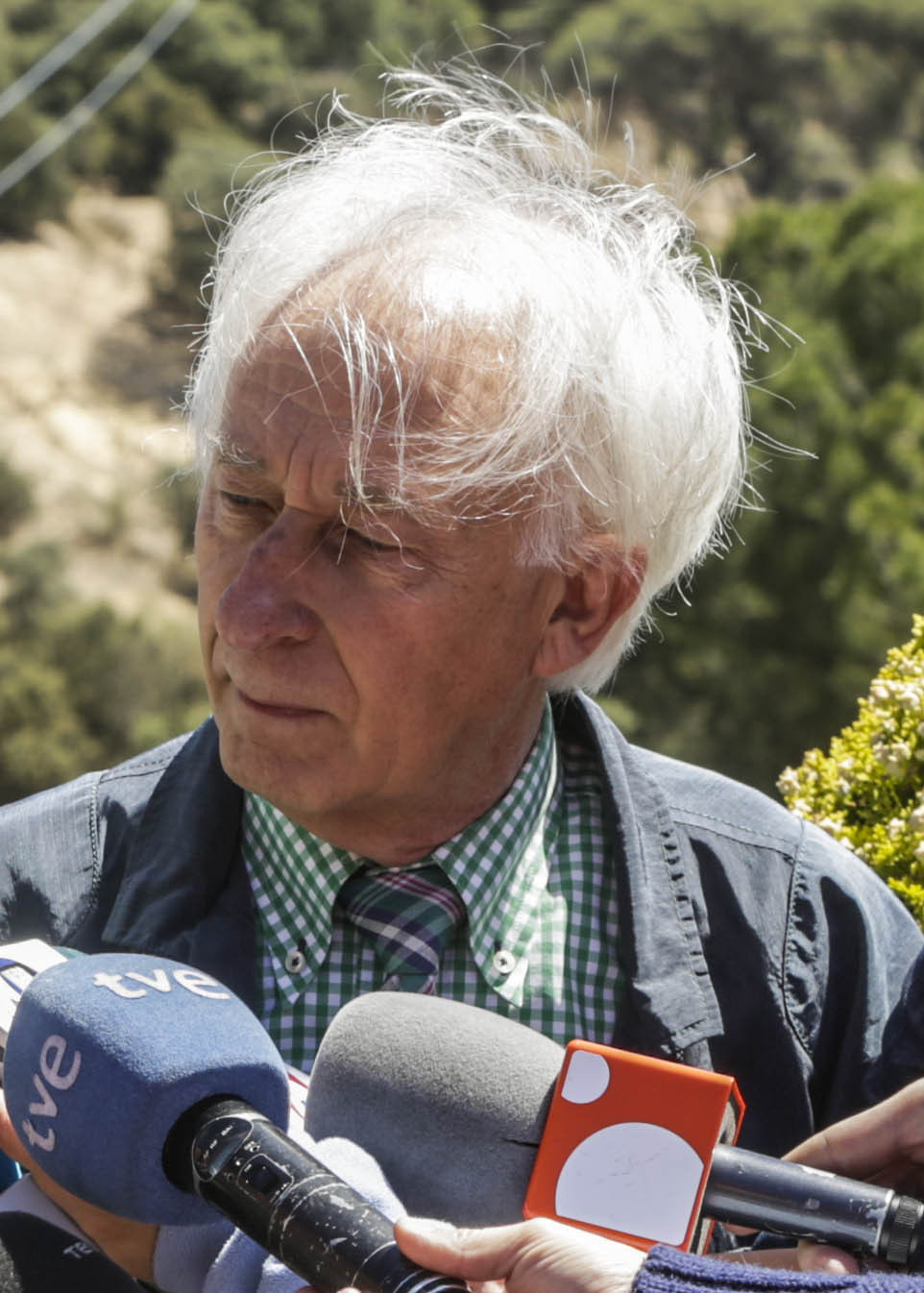
Boadella in 2015

Albert Boadella in his youth was close to Catalanist positions and, in general, to the Catalan anti-Francoist left, of which he was a cultural icon due to his actions in supporting the Nova Cançó. After the restoration of the Generalitat de Catalunya, and after the production of Operació Ubú (which parodied Jordi Pujol and confronted him with the governing nationalism), he became closer to the Socialists' Party of Catalonia, then in the opposition. Boadella confesses in his memoirs that these later actions were more to seek refuge from the boycotts of his works than by his own convictions.

Throughout his long career, carrying with him the common ideals of the defense of freedom and criticism of dogmatism, he has made furious criticisms of institutional power, ranging from Jordi Pujol, Francisco Franco, some bishops and the Esquerra Republicana de Catalunya. This has led to hatred towards him from the Spanish far-right, the Catalan independence movement, and some sectors of Catholicism. He has used his works to make scathing parodies of cultural figures such as Salvador Dalí, but also to show a fond admiration for others like Josep Pla, as in his La increíble historia del Dr. Floït & Mr. Pla (Note: The incredible story of Dr. Floit & Mr. Pla) (1997).

Boadella is belligerently opposed to the "Catalanist drift" to nationalism that he attributes to the Socialists' Party of Catalonia as a result of the Pact of Tinell and the policies of Catalan socialism under Pasqual Maragall's leadership. He was one of the intellectual promoters of the civic platform Ciutadans de Catalunya, from which emerged the Ciudadanos party. In the second congress of this party he was part of the opposition to Albert Rivera; after Rivera's victory, Boadella has distanced himself from the party. He would later transfer his support to the new party Union, Progress and Democracy, with approaches analogous to the original association of Ciutadans de Catalunya. In recent years, he has publicly supported efforts from the Ciudadanos party.

On 16 January 2018, he was introduced as "President-in-exile" of Tabarnia, a satirical anti-independence movement in Catalonia trying to separate the provinces of Tarragona and Barcelona from the rest of Catalonia in order to create a hypothetical 18th autonomous community.

== Works ==
=== Theater ===
- La torna (1977)
- M•7 Catalònia (1978)
- Operació Ubú (1981)
- Teledeum o Conferència per a l'aplicació pràctica de cultures extingides dins la planificació general de l'informe "Wallace Müller" (1983)
- Columbi lapsus (1989)
- Yo tengo un tío en América (1991)
- El Nacional (1993)
- La increíble historia del Dr. Floit & Mr. Pla (1997)
- Daaalí (1999)
- Ubú President o Los últimos días de Pompeya (2001)
- El retablo de las maravillas (2004)
- La torna de la torna (2005)
- En un lugar de Manhattan (2005)
- Controversia del toro y el torero (2006)
- La cena (2008)
- 2036 Omena-G (2010)

=== Television ===
- La Odisea, 5 chapters (1976 - 1977) (Televisión Española)

=== Books ===
- Columbi Lapsus (1993)
- Teledeum (1994)
- Yo tengo un tío en América (1995)
- El rapto de Talía (2000)
- Memorias de un bufón (2001)
- Adiós Cataluña. Crónicas de amor y de guerra (2007), winner of the Premio Espasa de Ensayo awards
- Dios los cría y ellos hablan de sexo, drogas, España, corrupción... (2010), along with Fernando Sánchez-Dragó
- Diarios de un francotirador. Mis desayunos con ella (2012)
- ¡Viva Tabarnia! (2018), prologue by Mario Vargas Llosa
- El Duque (2021)
- Joven, no me cabree. Contra el infantilismo progresista de la sociedad actual (2022), prologue by Cayetana Álvarez de Toledo.

=== Film ===
- Buen viaje, excelencia. (2003)
