= Teresa Giménez Barbat =

Spanish anthropologist, writer, and politician

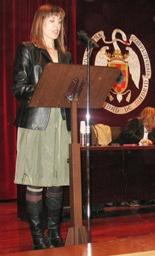

Member of European Parliament
- Incumbent
- Assumed office 25 November 2015

Personal details
- Born: María Teresa Giménez Barbat; 4 June 1955 (age 71) Barcelona, Spain
- Party: Union, Progress and Democracy
- Occupation: Writer, anthropologist, politician
- Website: gimenezbarbat.com

María Teresa Giménez Barbat (born 4 June 1955 in Barcelona, Catalonia, Spain) is a Spanish anthropologist, writer and politician. She advocates secular humanism, rationalist universalism and scepticism. She writes in two languages, Spanish and Catalan. She is member of the Spanish political party Union, Progress and Democracy (UPyD) and has participated in anti-nationalist movements before in Catalonia.

== Biography ==
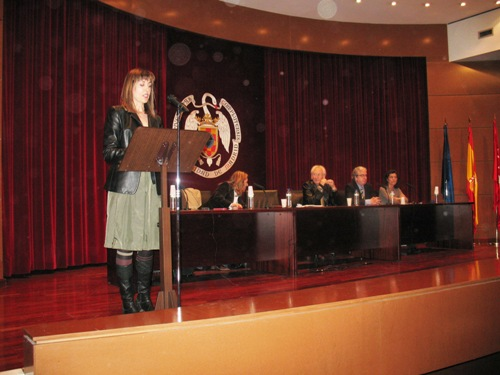
Teresa Giménez Barbat

She studied at the University of Barcelona, where she received a degree in anthropology. In 2008 she promoted the "Third Culture" association, and in 2009 "Secular Humanism Forum" dedicated to promote an ethic independent of religion.

In 2006 she was a member of the directorate of the political party Citizens of Catalonia, a new non-nationalist party. When UPyD was created with similar ideology, she joined the new formation, and since 2012, was a member of the directorate of the party in Catalonia. She was fifth in the UPyD list of candidates in the 2009 European Parliament Election.

== Books ==
- Polvo de Estrellas, Barcelona, Kairós 2003.
- Diari d'una escèptica, Barcelona, Tentadero 2007
- Citileaks: los españolistas de la Plaza Real
