= Instituto Carlos III-Juan March =

Spanish research and postgraduate institute

- Abbreviation: IC3JM
- Named after: Juan March Ordinas
- Formation: 1987; 39 years ago
- Headquarters: Getafe, Madrid metropolitan area
- Fields: Social science
- Director: Sandra León
- Affiliations: Carlos III University; Fundación Juan March
- Website: ic3jm.es
- Formerly called: Advanced Center for Social Science Studies (CEACS)

The Instituto Carlos III-Juan March (IC3JM), formerly the Advanced Center for Social Science Studies (CEACS), is a research and postgraduate institute for the social sciences. It is based at the Getafe campus of Carlos III University in the south of the Madrid metropolitan area. It receives funding from both the university and the Fundación Juan March.

== History ==
The predecessor organization of IC3JM, the Advanced Center for Social Science Studies (CEACS), opened in 1987 as part of the Fundación Juan March, which supports social science research along with other cultural objectives. The Foundation is based in the Salamanca district of central Madrid. CEACS offered master's degrees in social science for Spanish students as well as a programme of four-year grants for students to undertake a master's and write a doctoral thesis. In 2007, CEACS decided to focus on postdoctoral research as well, and it offered a three-year research grant to top professors worldwide.

In September 2013, the Juan March Foundation and the Carlos III University decided to jointly support CEACS, and turned CEACS into the Instituto Carlos III-Juan March (IC3JM), and relocated the campus from Salamanca in central Madrid to Getafe; the academic staff, activities, programmes, and library of the former CEACS were absorbed by IC3JM. The two organizations collaborated to found the institute in its current incarnation; it is located on Carlos III University campus but both organizations contribute funding. Ignacio Sánchez-Cuenca has served as IC3JM's Director since its inception in 2013.

== Academic focus ==
The Instituto Juan March de Estudios e Investigaciones is devoted to research in social science with a focus on political economy, voting and party competition. The main lines of research are the study of the social structure and processes of change in advanced contemporary societies, their political and economic systems and cultural and historical roots. The research carried out in the institute focuses above all, on the geographic and cultural area of Europe. Sociology and Political Science are the core disciplines within the institute.

Both teaching and research in the institute are orientated towards methodological issues and comparative approaches in the social sciences. Besides its own research activity, the institute encourages social science research, publishes collections of estudios (working papers and doctoral theses), runs a specialist library and organizes courses, seminars and other activities for faculty, researchers and students.

== Scientific committee ==
The director is [Sandra Leon]. The institute's scientific committee is responsible for the supervision of students' research assisting the Instituto Juan March in the definition of the center's academic and research policy, and advising on the development of the teaching curriculum and the library's holdings and services. The scientific committee is formed by a number of leading Spanish and international scholars. Members of the scientific committee have included:

- Richard Breen, Fellow of Nuffield College, Oxford University (2000–09)
- Gøsta Esping-Andersen, Professor of Sociology, Pompeu Fabra University
- José María Maravall, Professor of Sociology, Complutense University of Madrid
- José Ramón Montero, Professor of Political Science, Autonomous University of Madrid
- Adam Przeworski, Professor of Political Science and Economics, New York University
- Andrew Richards, Ph.D. at Princeton University
- Yasemin Soysal, Professor of Sociology, University of Essex

Juan J. Linz (Sterling Professor of Political and Social Science of Yale University) was an honorary member of the Scientific Committee.

== Academic relevance ==
The institute is well positioned in the ranking of the ECPR, but especially in the exhaustive Hix's ranking (2004) of Political Science Departments of the World. In the context of research in Spain, the institute is well-connected with the European University Institute, Oxford University, and several American universities.
