= Anton Font =

Spanish mime artist (1932–2021)

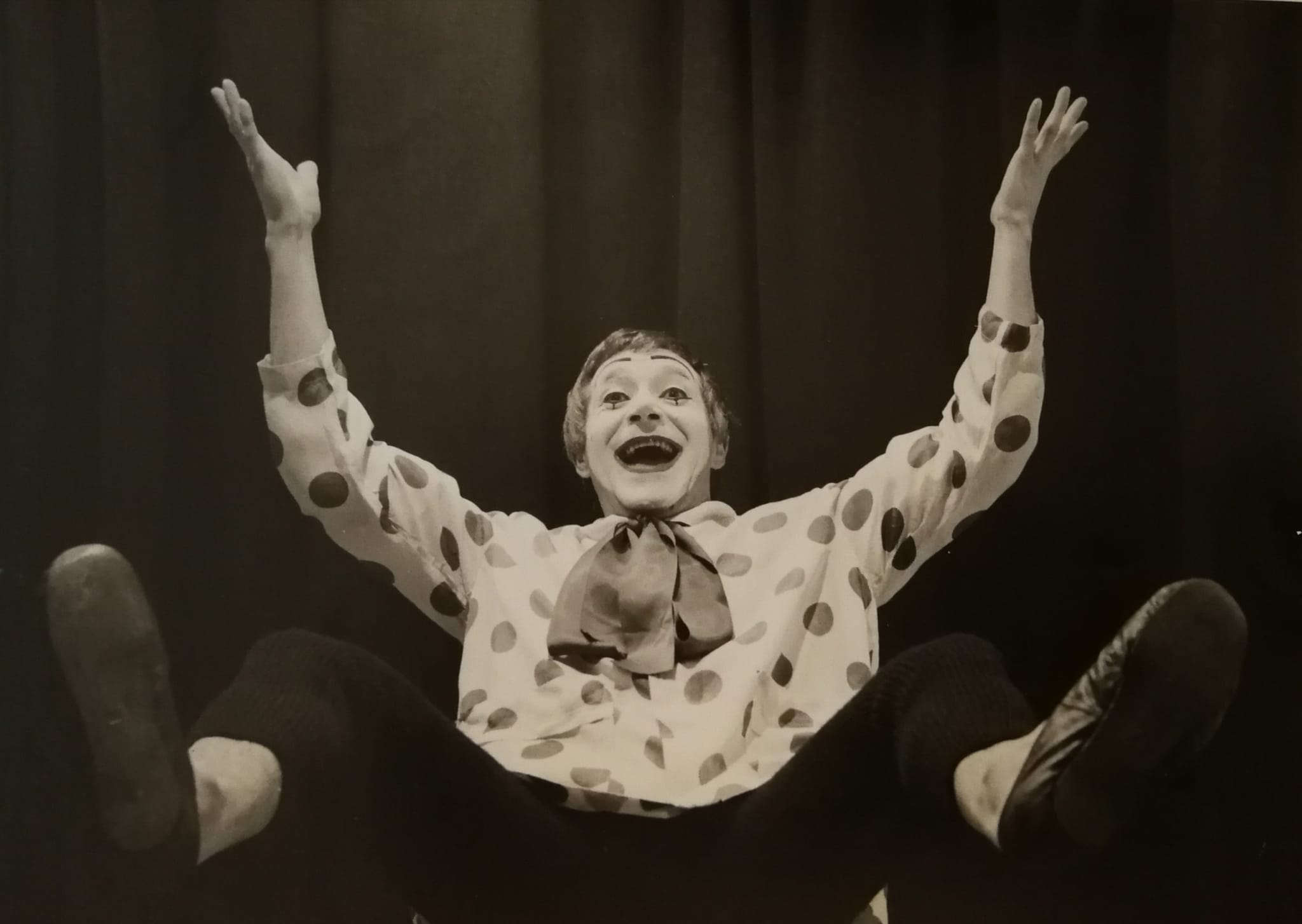
Anton Font

Anton Font Bernadet (28 January 1932 – 20 March 2021) was a Spanish mime artist and educator. He was during his career and life recognized by the French Federation of Dance and Body Expression in Europe as the “only representative of theatrical mime in the Spanish State”. He was the creator of the Catalan theater company Els Joglars.
