= José Ramón Montero =

Spanish political scientist

José Ramón Montero is a professor of Political Science at the Autonomous University of Madrid and at the Centro de Estudios Avanzados en Ciencias Sociales, Juan March Institute, Madrid. He obtained his Ph.D. in Law at the Universidad de Santiago, and has taught at the Universities of Granada, Santiago, Zaragoza, Cádiz and Complutense de Madrid.

He has been visiting fellow at the Universities of Harvard, California in Berkeley and Ohio State University, Secretary and Dean of the School of Law at the Universidad of Cádiz, and Deputy Director of the Centro de Investigaciones Sociológicas. He has been a member of the Standing Committee for the Social Sciences, European Science Foundation, and is currently a member of the Scientific Advisory Board of the European Social Survey and of the Academia Europaea. He has also been Director of the Economics and Social Science Programme, Comisión Interministerial de Ciencia y Tecnología, chairman of the Departamento de Ciencia Política y Relaciones Internacionales (UAM), and member of the Editorial Committee of the Revista Española de Ciencia Política. He has published extensively on electoral behaviour, political parties, and political culture.

Among his publications are La CEDA: el catolicismo social y político en la II República (1977), El control parlamentario (1985, with Joaquín G. Morillo); El régimen electoral (1996, with Richard Gunther et al.), and Democracy in Modern Spain (2004, with R. Gunther and Joan Botella); and has co-edited with Juan J. Linz, Crisis y cambio: electores y partidos en la España de los años ochenta (1986); with Ricardo Chueca, Elecciones autonómicas en Aragón (1995); with R. Gunther and J. J. Linz, Political parties: old concepts and new challenges (2002), and with Mariano Torcal, Political disaffection in contemporary democracies (2006).
