= Álvaro Pombo =

Spanish poet, novelist and activist

The Most Excellent Álvaro Pombo
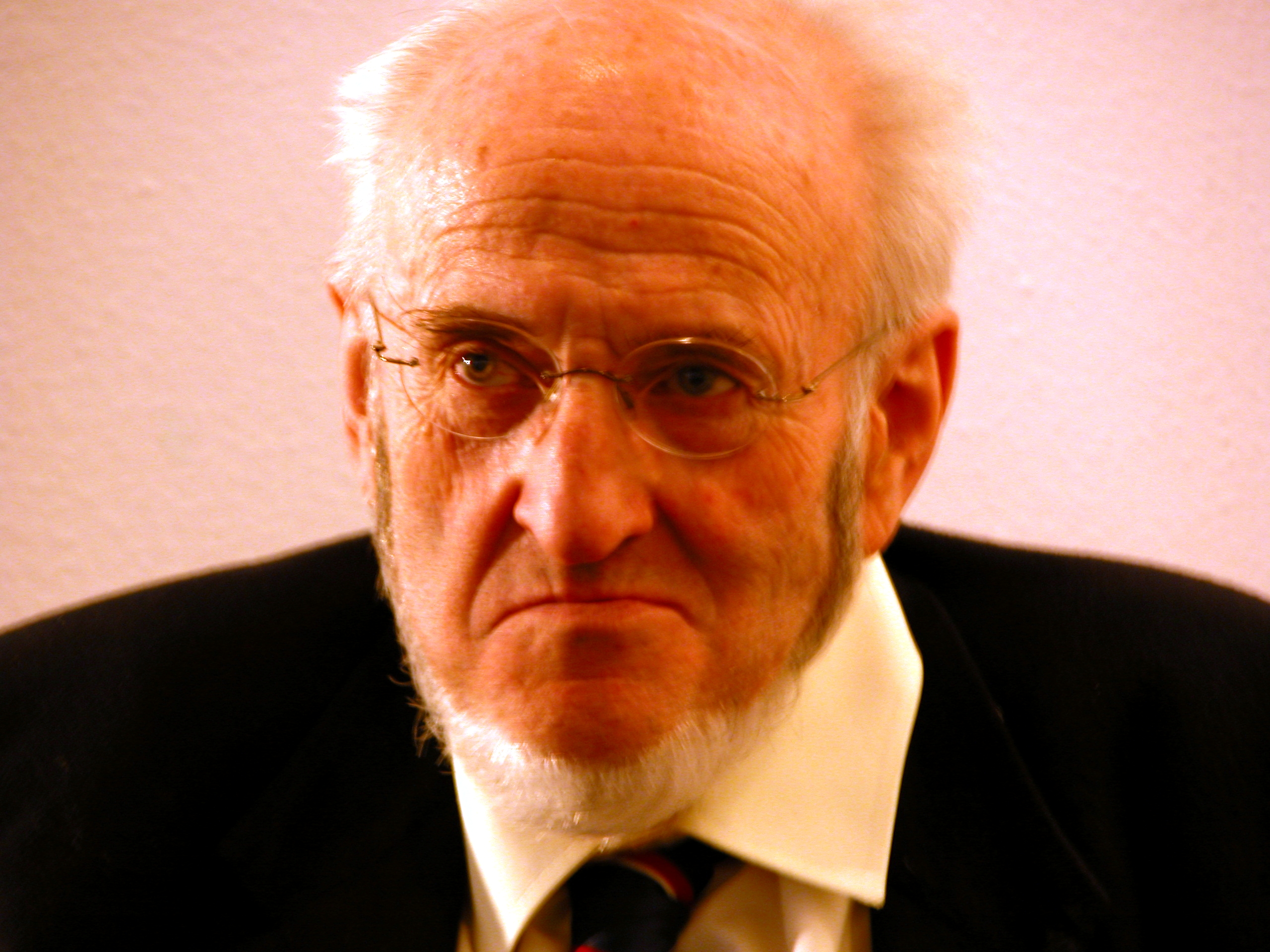
- Born: Álvaro Pombo García de los Ríos; 23 June 1939 (age 87); Santander, Spain

Seat j of the Real Academia Española
- Incumbent
- Assumed office 20 June 2004 (Note: Elected on 19 December 2002)
- Preceded by: Pedro Laín Entralgo

Álvaro Pombo García de los Ríos (born 23 June 1939) is a Spanish poet, novelist and activist.

== Life and career ==
Born in Santander, Cantabria, he studied at the Complutense University of Madrid and received a Bachelor of Arts in philosophy at Birkbeck, University of London, where he lived between 1966 and 1977. His first book of poetry, Protocolos, was published in 1973, and four years later he won the El Bardo prize for his 1977 Variaciones. Returning to Spain that year, he published a collection of short stories, Relatos sobre la falta de sustancia, many of which contained homosexual characters and themes.

Pombo was elected to seat j of the Real Academia Española on 19 December 2002, he took up his seat on 20 June 2004.

== Prizes and awards ==
- In October 2006, Pombo was awarded the Premio Planeta literary prize for his novel La fortuna de Matilda Turpin.
- In 2012 he was awarded the Premio Nadal for his novel El temblor del héroe.
- In November 2024, Pombo was awarded the Miguel de Cervantes Prize for his “extraordinary creative personality, his unique lyrics and his original narration”.

== Works ==
Novels

- El héroe de las mansardas de Mansard (1983)
- El hijo adoptivo (1986)
- Los delitos insignificantes (1986)
- El parecido (1988)
- El metro de platino iridiado (1990)
- Aparición del eterno femenino contada por S. M. el Rey (1993)
- Telepena de Cecilia Cecilia Villalobo (1995)
- Vida de san Francisco de Asís (1996)
- Donde las mujeres (1996)
- La cuadratura del círculo (1999)
- El cielo raso (2001)
- Una ventana al norte (2004)
- Contra natura (2005)
- La fortuna de Matilda Turpin (2006)
- Virginia o el interior del mundo (2009)
- La previa muerte del lugarteniente Aloof (2009)
- El temblor del héroe (2012)
- Quédate con nosotros, Señor, porque atardece (2013)
- La transformación de Johanna Sansíleri (2014)
- Un gran mundo (2015)
- La casa del reloj (2016)
- Retrato del vizconde en invierno (2018)
- El destino de un gato común (2020)
- Santander, 1936 (2023)
- El exclaustrado (2024)

Short stories

- Relatos sobre la falta de sustancia (1977)
- Cuentos reciclados (1997)

Poetry

- Protocolos (1973)
- Variaciones (1977)
- Hacia una constitución poética del año en curso (1980)
- Protocolos para la rehabilitación del firmamento (1992)
- Protocolos, 1973-2003 (2004)
- Los enunciados protocolarios (2009)

Essays

- Alrededores (2002)
