= Francisco Sosa Wagner =

Spanish jurist, professor of administrative law, writer and politician

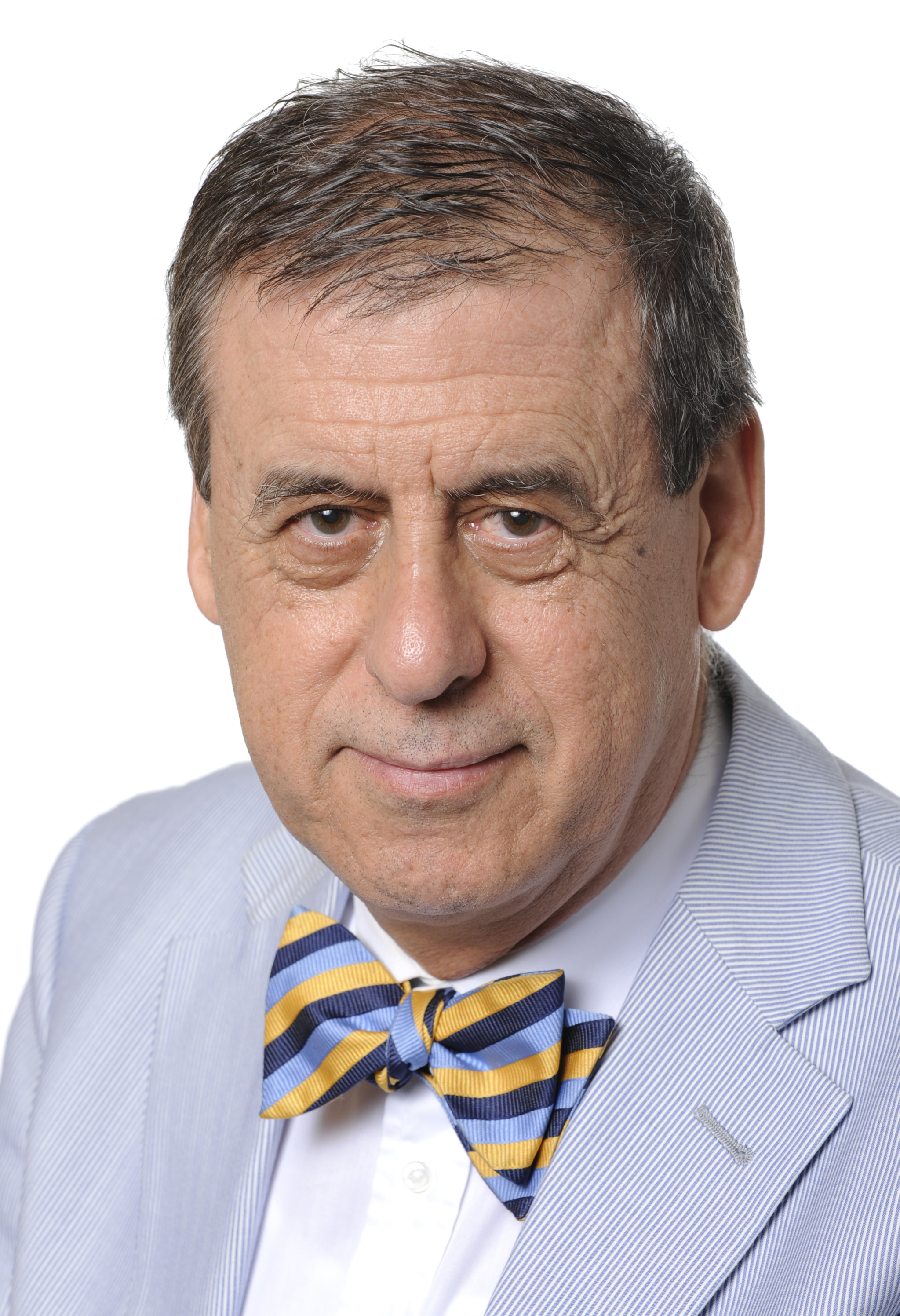

Member of European Parliament
- In office 2009 – 19 October 2014

Personal details
- Born: 10 June 1946 (age 79) Alhucemas, Spanish protectorate of Morocco
- Party: C’s (since 2015); UPyD (2008–2014)

Francisco Sosa Wagner (born 15 June 1946 in Alhucemas, Spanish Protectorate of Morocco) is a Spanish jurist, professor of administrative law, writer and politician. He was elected at the 2009 European election as a Member of the European Parliament (MEP) for the Union, Progress and Democracy party. He was re-elected in 2014, but resigned his seat in October that year.
