= Arcadi Espada =

Spanish writer and journalist

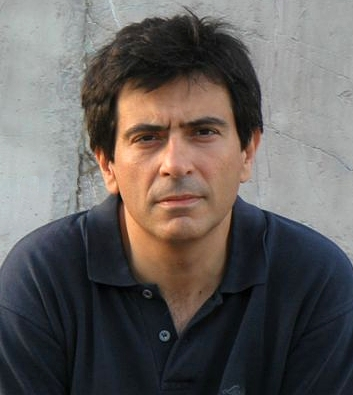
- Born: 1957 (age 68–69)
- Occupation: Writer
- Writing career
- Language: Spanish
- Website: www.arcadiespada.es

Arcadi Espada (born 1957) is a Spanish writer and journalist.

== Early life ==
Arcadi Espada, known in his early years as Arcadio Espada, was born in Barcelona in 1957 and graduated with a degree in Information Sciences from the Autonomous University of Barcelona in 1981.

== Profesional activity ==
Since 1977, he has been contributing to various daily newspapers: Mundo Diario, El Noticiero Universal, La Vanguardia, Diario de Barcelona, El País and, currently, El Mundo. From November 2010 to February 2011, he was director of the Ibercrea Institute.

He won the Ciudad de Barcelona de Literatura's 2000 Francisco Cerecedo award for his Contra Catalunya, the 2002 Espasa de Ensayo award for Diarios, and the 2000 Association of European Journalists' Francisco Cerecedo prize for his El Raval: del amor a los niños.
