= ¡Basta Ya! =

Spanish grassroots anti-terrorism organization

¡Basta Ya! (English: Enough is Enough!) was a Spanish grassroots organization uniting individuals of various political positions against terrorism and violence, notably ETA, and against the proposal for a new Statute of Autonomy of the Basque Country released by the government of President Juan José Ibarretxe. Its principal activities were anti-terror demonstrations and protests. The ¡Basta Ya! movement was a civic initiative made up of people of differing ideologies, and welcomes any citizens willing to play an active part provided they adhere to three basic principles: defend against terrorism of any sort, regardless of origin or intensity, support all victims of terrorism or of political violence and defend the rule of law, the Spanish Constitution and the Statute of Autonomy of the Basque Country. ¡Basta Ya! was created to promote social mobilization against the perpetrators of specific kinds of violence, to support those who are suffering from them, and to demand that authorities fulfill the requirements of current legislation, respecting the rule of law. The organization believes that criticism of terrorism on moral grounds is important but not enough. Criticism on political grounds is also important, and the initiative understands such criticism to be based on certain values – such as human rights - which are common to all democrats regardless of their party affiliations or their political leanings.

== Main ideals ==
The European Parliament describes the main ideals of ¡Basta Ya! as the following:

- Clear and peaceful opposition to terrorism of any kind.
- To provide support for all victims of terrorism and violence and to ensure that the perpetrators of these criminal acts are made responsible for their actions.
- The right to hold views different from those of extreme and exclusive nationalists, without aggression, marginalization or discrimination of any kind.
- That the democratic institutions in the Basque Country must fulfill their obligations and respect the rule of law.

== Sakharov Prize ==
In 2000, the ¡Basta Ya! movement won the Sakharov Prize, a prize awarded to defence of human rights and freedoms. The group was nominated for the Sakharov Prize in 2000 by Gerardo Galeote Quecedo, José Ignacio Salafranca and others. According to the European Parliament, they nominated for three distinct activities that the organization carried out in 2000. In February ¡Basta Ya! organized a demonstration in San Sebastián under the slogan "Por la libertad, ETA kampora" ("For freedom, ETA out"). This demonstration gathered more than 100,000 people. During this silent demonstration, one of the platform members invited Spanish citizens to support his cause as they stood at the Boulevard under the slogan "Let's defend what join's us together". The Initiative called for a demonstration in San Sebastián under the slogan "Por la vida y la libertad. Defendamos lo que nos une: Estatuto y Constitución" ("For life and freedom. Let us defend what unites us: Statute and Constitution"). In June 2000, the Citizen's Initiative called for a mass meeting on the first Thursday of every month in San Sebastián, in solidarity with all those citizens threatened and attacked because of their defense of democratic values.

Well-known members of the platform are Jon Juaristi, Maite Pagazaurtundua, Arcadi Espada, Carmen Iglesias, Javier Urquizu and Fernando Savater.

== Financing ==
All the activities of ¡Basta Ya! have been financed by the contributions of private citizens and by the "Miguel Angel Blanco Foundation's" subvention for the September demonstration for the defense of the Constitution and the Statute. Some other civic groups such as "The Gregorio Ordoñez Foundation", "White Hands" and "Denon Artean" have also helped the initiative in different ways. It now also has at its disposal the 50,000 Euros of the Sakharov Prize.

== End ==
¡Basta Ya! declared that it wishes to be able to dissolve itself as soon as possible because it has become unnecessary. That is, because citizens of Spain are no longer running the risk of being assassinated or attacked because of their ideas or identities, and because the Rule of Law worked in a reasonable way, the organization can discontinue itself. ¡Basta Ya! is determined to carry on functioning and calling on all citizens to mobilize whenever it seems necessary.

In 2007, the organization was dissolved.

== See also ==
- ¡Ya basta!
