= Rosa Díez =

Spanish politician

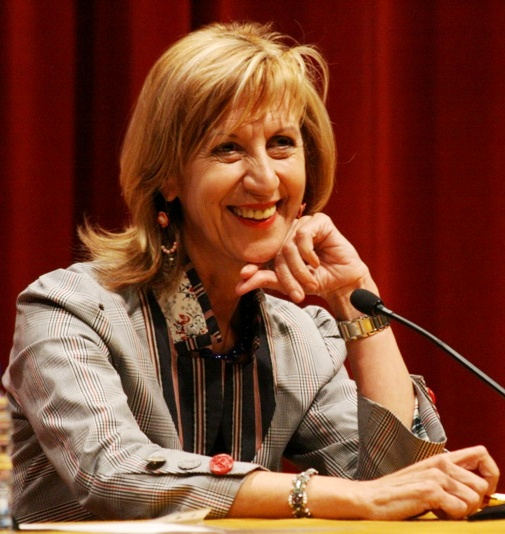

Spokesperson of Union, Progress and Democracy Parliamentary Group in the Congress of Deputies
- In office 15 December 2011 – 13 January 2016

Member of the Congress of Deputies
- In office 1 April 2008 – 13 January 2016
- Constituency: Madrid

Spokesperson of Union, Progress and Democracy
- In office 26 September 2007 – 11 July 2015
- Succeeded by: Andrés Herzog

Member of the European Parliament for Spain
- In office 20 July 1999 – 28 August 2007

President of the Spanish Socialist Delegation in the European Parliament
- In office 20 July 1999 – 19 July 2004
- Preceded by: Manuel Medina Ortega
- Succeeded by: Enrique Barón Crespo

Member of Basque Parliament
- In office 8 January 1987 – 6 July 1999
- Constituency: Biscay

Minister for Commerce, Consumption and Tourism of the Basque Government
- In office 4 October 1991 – 1 July 1998
- President: José Antonio Ardanza
- Preceded by: Jon Imanol Azúa (Industry and Commerce); Joseba Arregi Aranburu (Culture and Tourism)
- Succeeded by: Belén Greaves Badillo

Councillor for the Municipality of Güeñes
- In office 20 June 1987 – 15 June 1991

Member of the General Assemblies of Biscay
- In office 24 May 1983 – 15 April 1987

Member of the Foral Diputation of Biscay
- In office 3 May 1979 – 10 March 1983

Personal details
- Born: Rosa María Díez González; 27 May 1952 (age 74) Sodupe, Biscay, Spain
- Party: UPyD (2007–2020); PSOE (1977–2007)
- Other political affiliations: UGT (1976–2007)
- Spouse: José Ignacio Fernández de Ochoa
- Children: Two

Rosa María Díez González (born 27 May 1952) is a Spanish politician from Union, Progress and Democracy, UPyD deputy in the Congress of Deputies from 2008 to 2016.

During her time in the PSOE, she defined herself exclusively as a social democrat. In her 2000 manifesto for the post of Secretary-General at the 35th Federal Congress of the Socialist Party, she argued that the PSOE should be a clearly social democratic party representing and integrating a broad sociological spectrum. That spectrum would have gone "from the centre to the political left—that is, from liberalism with a greater emphasis on social conscience to classical social democracy". She also asserted that "egalitarian doctrines can only flourish in a free society, meaning they're incompatible with authoritarianism and systems that deny the free market". This was consistent with her evolution in claiming to belong to both social democracy and political liberalism when she was UPyD's leader and spokesperson. Consequently, Rosa Díez now self-defines as a social liberal—or an unorthodox social democrat—politician who endorses free-market economics, civil liberties, and the welfare state, albeit still maintaining an essentially social democratic conviction. It's also noteworthy that she shifted from defending regional autonomism during most of her socialist period to advocating centralism. This divergence regarding the form of state, as well as her rejection of the anti-terrorist policy implemented by José Luis Rodríguez Zapatero's socialist government, was the main reason for her departure from the PSOE. Although she is a convinced republican who favours the periodic election of the head of state over hereditary succession, the former PSOE and UPyD politician adopts a pragmatic stance towards the Spanish monarchy "in self-defence". She therefore maintains that any constitutional reform aimed at changing the form of government should be temporarily postponed, as she thinks that a parliamentary monarchy safeguards Spain's interests amid the current high level of political polarisation by acting as a guarantor of its unity, national sovereignty and territorial integrity. In addition, Rosa Díez is a secularist politician who stands up for secularity as "respect for all religious beliefs, except for Islam and any other religion that isn't respectful of human rights". She also professes herself to be a constitutionalist, feminist, pro-European, progressive, reformist, Spanish patriot, and upholder of liberal democracy.

While remaining firmly centre-left during her career as a socialist, Rosa Díez self-identifies with transversality as well as centre-left since she created UPyD. Therefore, she vehemently defends what she deems progressive from anywhere on the left–right political spectrum. She also asseverates that centrism is worthless, as it just represents a moderate, equidistant position between the left and right. Furthermore, she describes herself as a "radical democrat who strives for democracy's regeneration by abiding by its rules". Expressed differently, she defines herself as "a pro-institutional leader whose radical politics—moderate in form and revolutionary in essence—bothers the establishment", for she wants to "transform politics by bringing off substantial, in-depth changes from within institutions". Due to her self-proclaimed radicalism and transversality, Rosa Díez is frequently associated with radical centrism.

Unlike Citizens' "sensible and moderate centrism", characterised by a fear of being perceived as right-wing, her radical centrist views have not prevented her from supporting an electoral coalition between the People's Party, Vox, and Citizens. Indeed, she urged people to vote for the centre-right PP in the November 2019 Spanish general election. Even more notably, she lent her support to the two no-confidence motions against Pedro Sánchez that were proposed by the right-wing national-conservative party Vox during the 14th legislature.

== Career ==
She was a former Member of the European Parliament for the Spanish Socialist Workers' Party (PSOE), integrated in the Party of European Socialists. In 2007, she gave up her seat and left the PSOE, particularly due to disagreement on what she perceived to be the Socialists' drift on individual liberties.

She founded a new political party called Unión, Progreso y Democracia in Spanish and Union, Progress and Democracy in English (UPyD), based on the existing movement of Basque citizens against ETA violence ¡Basta Ya!. In 2008 and 2011, she was elected to the Congress of Deputies representing Madrid district. In the Spanish General Elections of 2011, she was re-elected, and her party was the fourth most voted party in Spain.

Díez personally advocates for lower public wages. Subsequently, although she was the UPyD spokesperson on five committees, she was only paid for one of them.

On 24 May 2015, she announced she would not seek reelection as spokesperson of UPyD due to the party's poor performance in the regional and municipal elections.

In 2020, during the COVID-19 pandemic, she was proposed as prospective cabinet member in a "Salvation Government" by far-right Vox.
