= Benavent =

Benavent is a toponymic Catalan surname. The surname carries links to the settlements of Benavent de la Conca and Benavent de Segrià, of which the Benavents were nobles according to Pedro Vitales. The toponym "Benavent" came from the Romans, with a theorized meaning in Latin of "a place of good fortune or happiness". Notable people with this surname include:

- Carles Benavent (born 1954), Catalan flamenco and jazz player
- Elísabet Benavent (born 1984), Valencian writer
- Emilio Benavent (1914–2008), Valencian Catholic Archbishop
- Marcos Benavent (born 1970), Valencian businessman and politician
- Rosario Benavent (1901–1921), Catalan anarchist activist

== See also ==
- Benavente, the Castilian equivalent of the surname
