= Benavente (surname) =

Benavente is a Spanish surname. Notable people with the surname include:

- Diego Benavente (born 1959), Northern Mariana Islands politician
- Cristian Benavente (born 1994), Peruvian-Spanish soccer player
- Jacinto Benavente (1866–1954), Spanish dramatist
- Judit Benavente (born 1989), Spanish model, public figure and influencer
- Saulo Benavente (1916–1982), Argentine painter

== See also ==
- Benavent, the Catalan equivalent of the surname
