= A Parda =

Neighbourhood in Pontevedra, Spain

- Neighbourhood
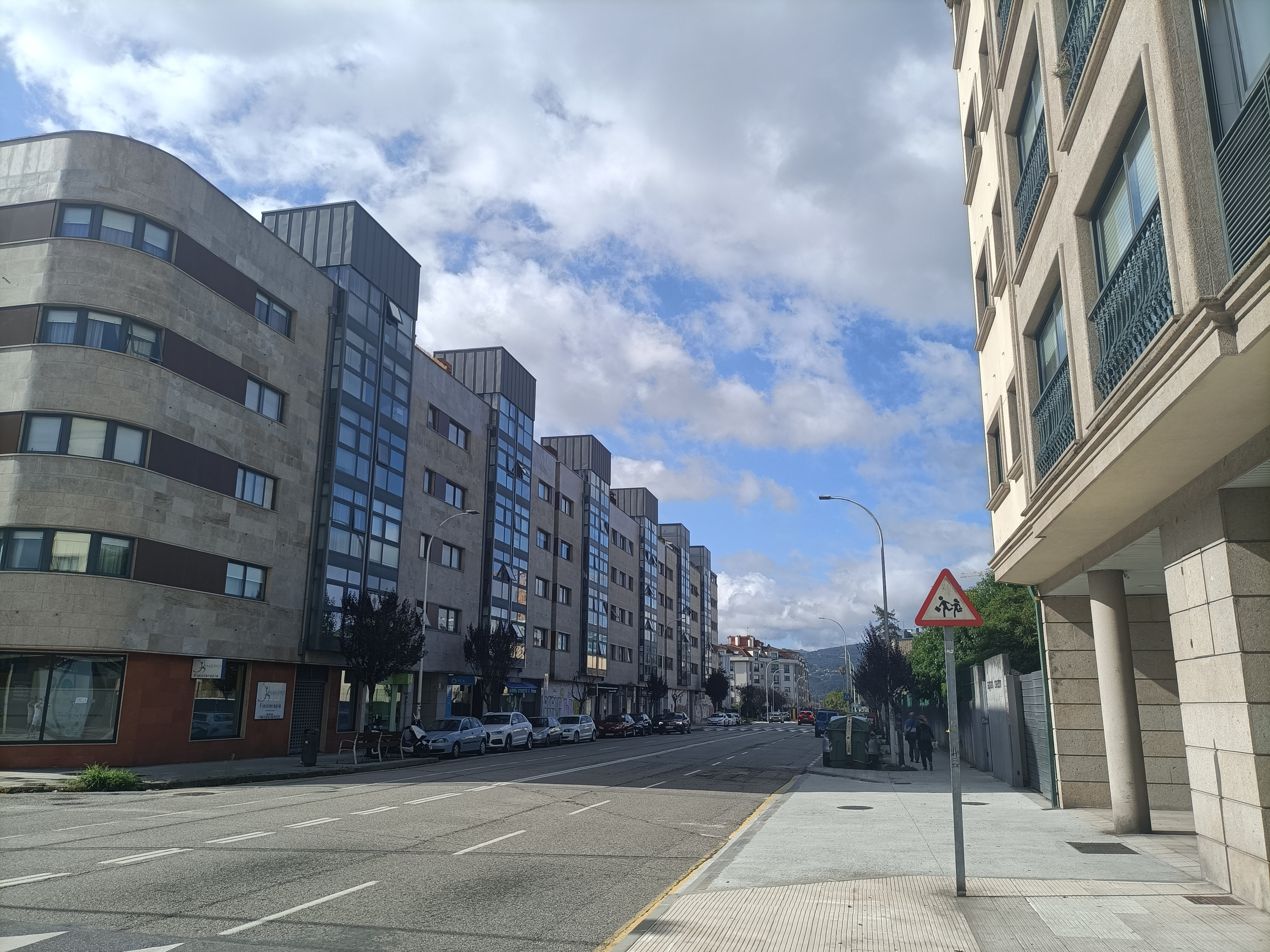
- Virxinia Pereira Renda Avenue
- Interactive map of A Parda
- Coordinates: 42°25′32.7″N 8°37′49.6″W
- Country: Spain
- City: Pontevedra
- Postal code: 36004

A Parda is a neighbourhood located in the eastern part of the city of Pontevedra (Spain). It has a mainly residential function and also has important judicial, educational and health facilities.

== Location ==
The A Parda neighbourhood is located in the east of the city of Pontevedra. It is bounded on the north by Estrada Street and the PO-532, on the south by the PO-542 and El Marco, on the east by the Ronda Este ring road and on the west by the railway tracks and the railway station. To the east of the neighbourhood is the St. Maurus municipal cemetery, designed in 1879 by the architect Alejandro Sesmero and inaugurated in September 1882.

== History ==
The toponym Parda comes from "parta" which means watery land, marsh or wetland and refers to the wetland or Xunqueira da Parda which is located in the neighbourhood to the east of Pontevedra railway station, on the other side of the railway tracks and covers 8,000 square metres.

The pazo of A Parda, located to the south of the district, near the PO-542 road, originated from the Acuña lineage. It dates from 1620 and was founded by the Malvar brothers, deans of the cathedral of Santiago de Compostela. It was built mainly in the 18th and 19th centuries. The pazo hosted important political meetings at the beginning of the 20th century, when its owner, Gabino Bugallal Araújo, 2nd Count of Bugallal and several times minister of the Crown and president of the Spanish Parliament, made it his summer residence.

The development of the A Parda neighbourhood began with the demolition of the old provincial prison of A Parda thanks to an agreement reached by the mayor Juan Luis Pedrosa in 1995 and the construction on its site of the first of the judicial buildings of the Judicial Complex of Pontevedra, whose works began at the beginning of 1996, and which was inaugurated in 1998.

In 1999, the land was finally urbanised and a four-lane 22 metres wide transverse avenue Juan Carlos I (currently Virxinia Pereira Renda Avenue) was built, between Estrada and Pintor Laxeiro streets.

In July 2001, the construction of the new building of the Professional Music Conservatory of Pontevedra was authorised on Juan Carlos I Avenue, which was inaugurated in September 2004. From 2002, the expansion of the neighbourhood accelerated.

In 2006, work began on the construction of the new A Parda health centre, located on Gaitero Ricardo Portela Street. The health centre, which includes a Continuous Care Point (PAC), was inaugurated in October 2009.

In 2008, construction of the A Parda sports complex began. The work was only half completed when the concessionaire went bankrupt in 2009.

On 9 September 2009, the Camellias Park was inaugurated in the A Parda neighbourhood, with its entrance on Gaiteiro Ricardo Portela Street.

In 2010, the refurbishment of Pintor Laxeiro Street was completed, which now has four lanes of traffic. In 2011, the urbanisation of the surrounding streets was completed, and the green areas were increased by 4220 square metres.

In January 2011, the A Parda nursery school, located in Diego Sarmiento de Acuña street, was opened and is part of the A galiña azul nursery school network of the Xunta de Galicia. It was designed by the architect José Ramón Garitaonaindía de Vera.

The construction of the second court building started on 1 August 2016. The new building was inaugurated on 3 September 2019. From that moment on, Pontevedra has a Judicial Complex consisting of these two court buildings in the A Parda district.

In October 2019, the nearly one-kilometre long Ronda Este (eastern ring road), which bypasses the neighbourhood to the east and improves access to the Montecelo Hospital, was opened.

== Urban planning ==
A Parda is the main neighbourhood in the eastern part of Pontevedra and is built around a main four-lane avenue, Virxinia Pereira Renda Avenue, and a four-lane street that runs through it, Pintor Laxeiro Street. Estrada and Hortas Streets connect the district to the west with the city centre, and Hortas Street also connects it to the railway and bus stations.

The main parks in the district are the Camellia Park and the Martin Balea Park. The Camellia Park covers 8,000 square metres and has a children's playground. It has an ornamental fountain forming a semicircular bench and tree species such as camellias and magnolias. Martín Balea Park, located between Pintor Laxeiro and Bacelar streets, will have a children's playground of approximately 1,000 square metres in 2023, which will be the largest in the neighbourhood. The neighbourhood also has a park in Soutos Street, which includes a children's playground too.

There are plans to build a large urban park in the neighbourhood, covering an area of 34,000 square metres (3.4 hectares). The park will have several zones. A children's playground called "nature park" with slides and zip lines in the area closest to the courthouse; a small channelled stream, from a landmark converted into a fountain, which will cross the entire plot until it flows into the Gafos river; a linear walkway parallel to the train tracks that will include two 36 square metre viewpoints; and a large green area at the southern end of the park. The whole area will have urban furniture, seating areas and plantations of native tree species, including shrubs, grasses, ferns and trees of different sizes such as oaks and lime trees, as well as birches, alders, ashes, hawthorns, wild cherry trees, Atlantic pear trees and European crab apple trees.

In Marco Street, to the right of Conde de Bugallal Avenue, there is the Pazo of A Parda.

== Facilities ==
=== Schools and educational institutions ===
The A Parda district has several schools:

- The Manuel Quiroga Professional Music Conservatory of the Xunta de Galicia, in Virxinia Pereira Renda Avenue. This new conservatory was inaugurated in 2004.
- A Parda Nursery School, managed by the Xunta de Galicia, which is part of the A galiña azul nursery school network. It was inaugurated in 2011.
- The Sagrado Corazón de Jesús private multilingual school.

=== Government offices and bodies ===
The area is home to the Pontevedra Judicial Complex, consisting of two buildings of eight and six floors, inaugurated in 1998 and 2019 respectively.

=== Health centres ===
The A Parda Health Centre is located in the neighbourhood, which has a Continuous Care Point (PAC).

=== Sports and leisure ===
- The future sports complex in the A Parda neighbourhood will be located to the west of Francisco Tomás y Valiente Street, opposite the 1998 court building. It will be put out to tender in 2023 and two pavilions will be built, a sports hall and another centre for rhythmic gymnastics as well as climbing wall.

== Gallery ==
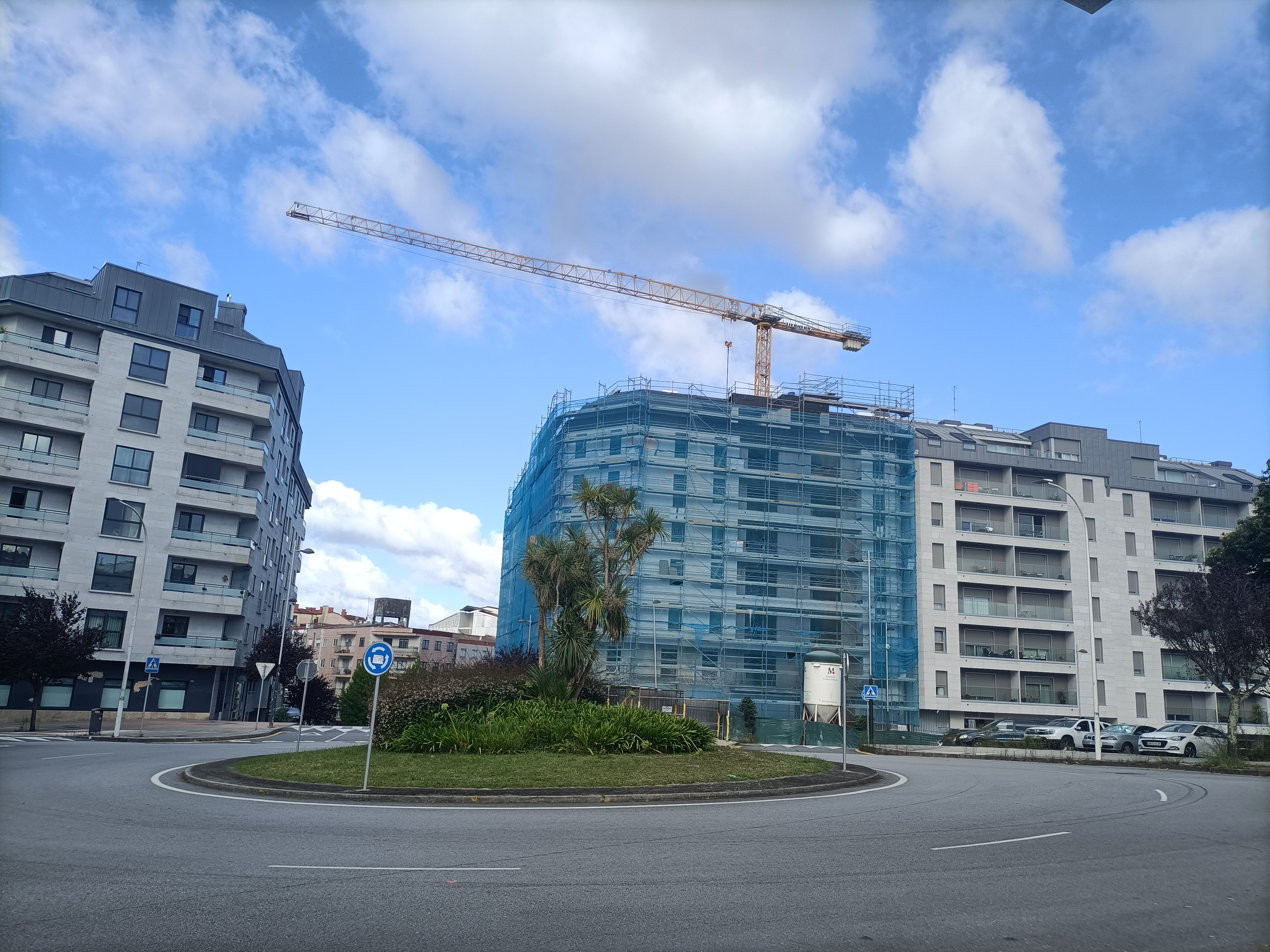
A Parda

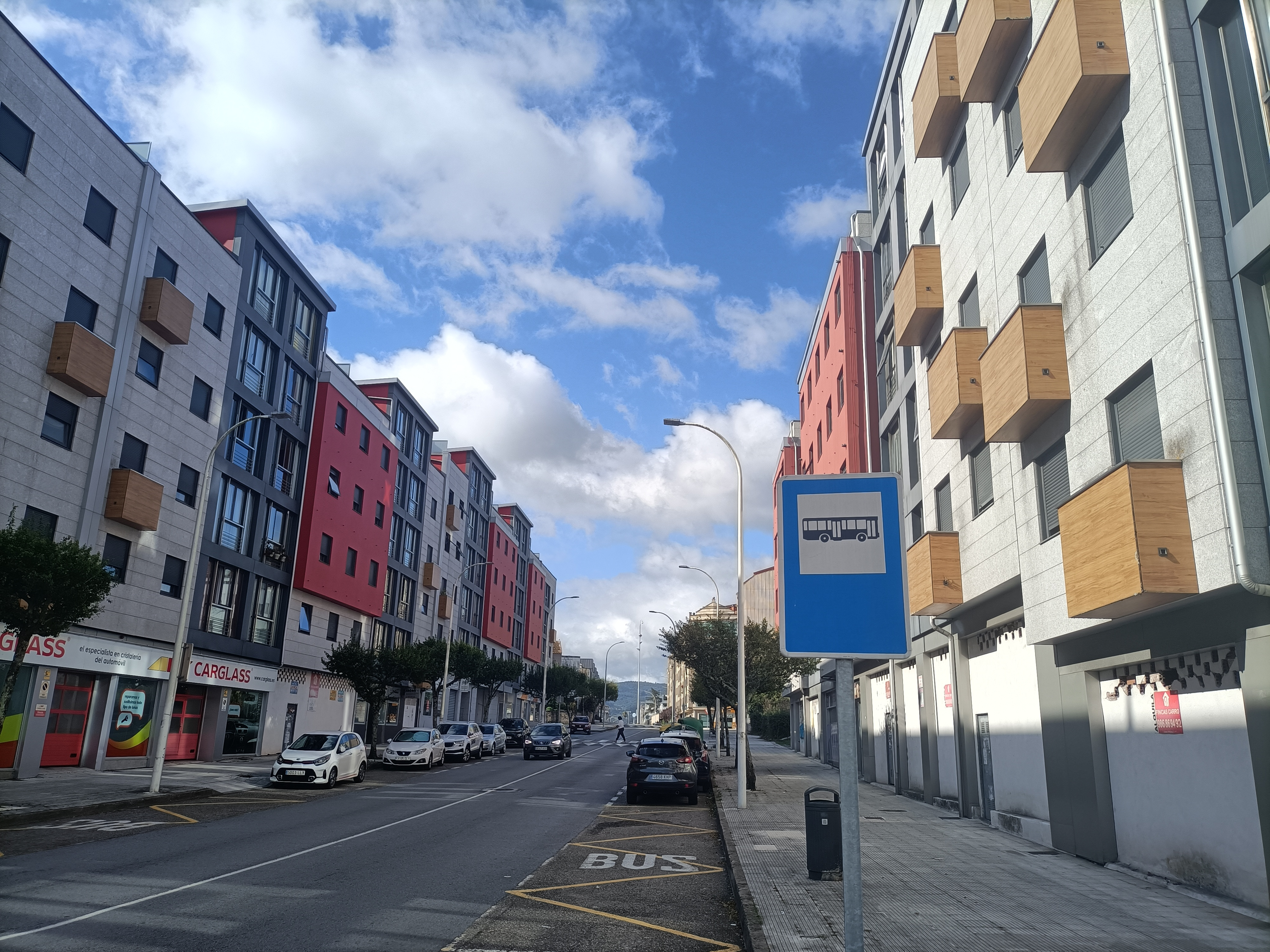
Virxinia Pereira Renda Avenue

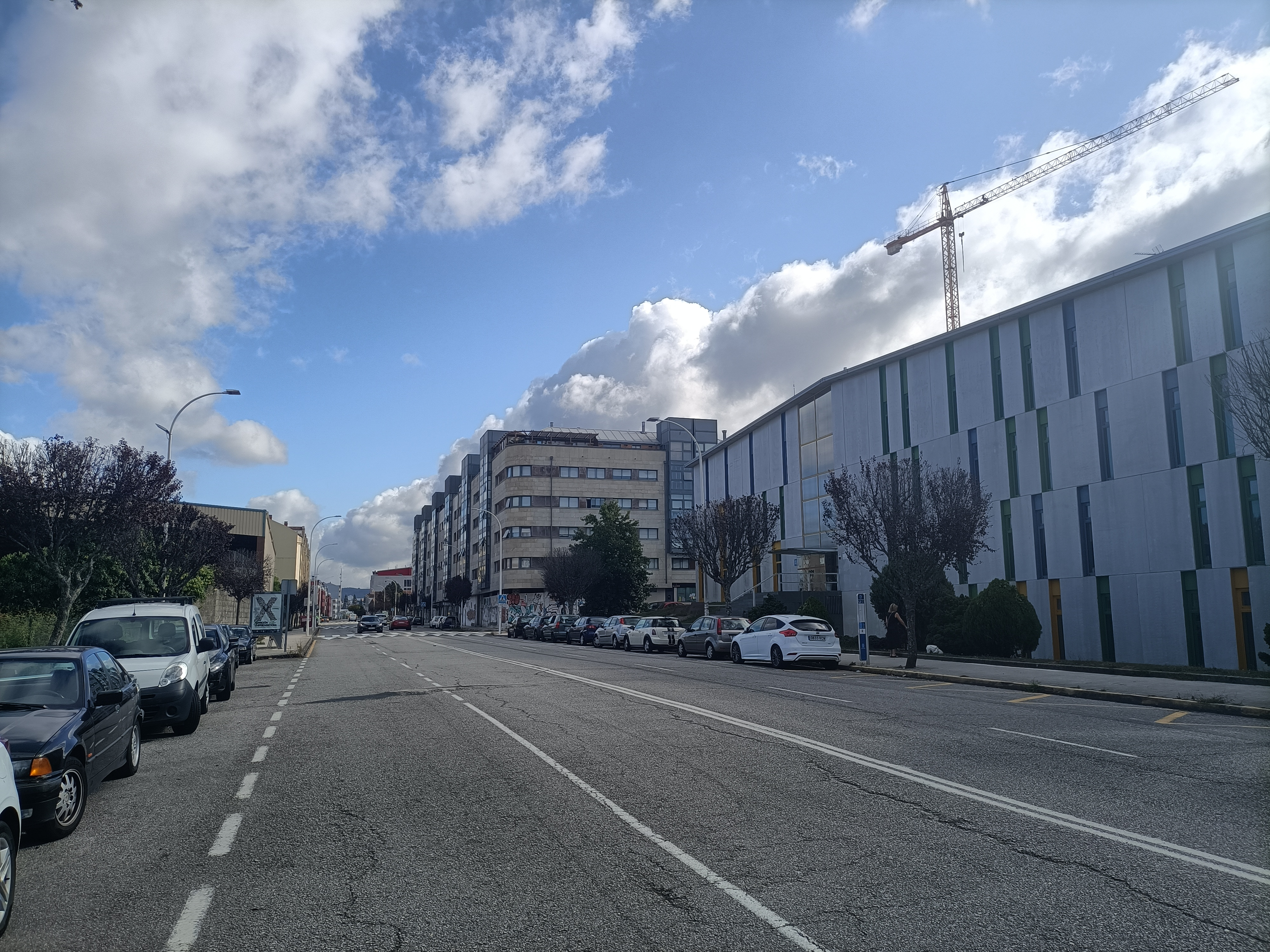
Virxinia Pereira Renda Avenue

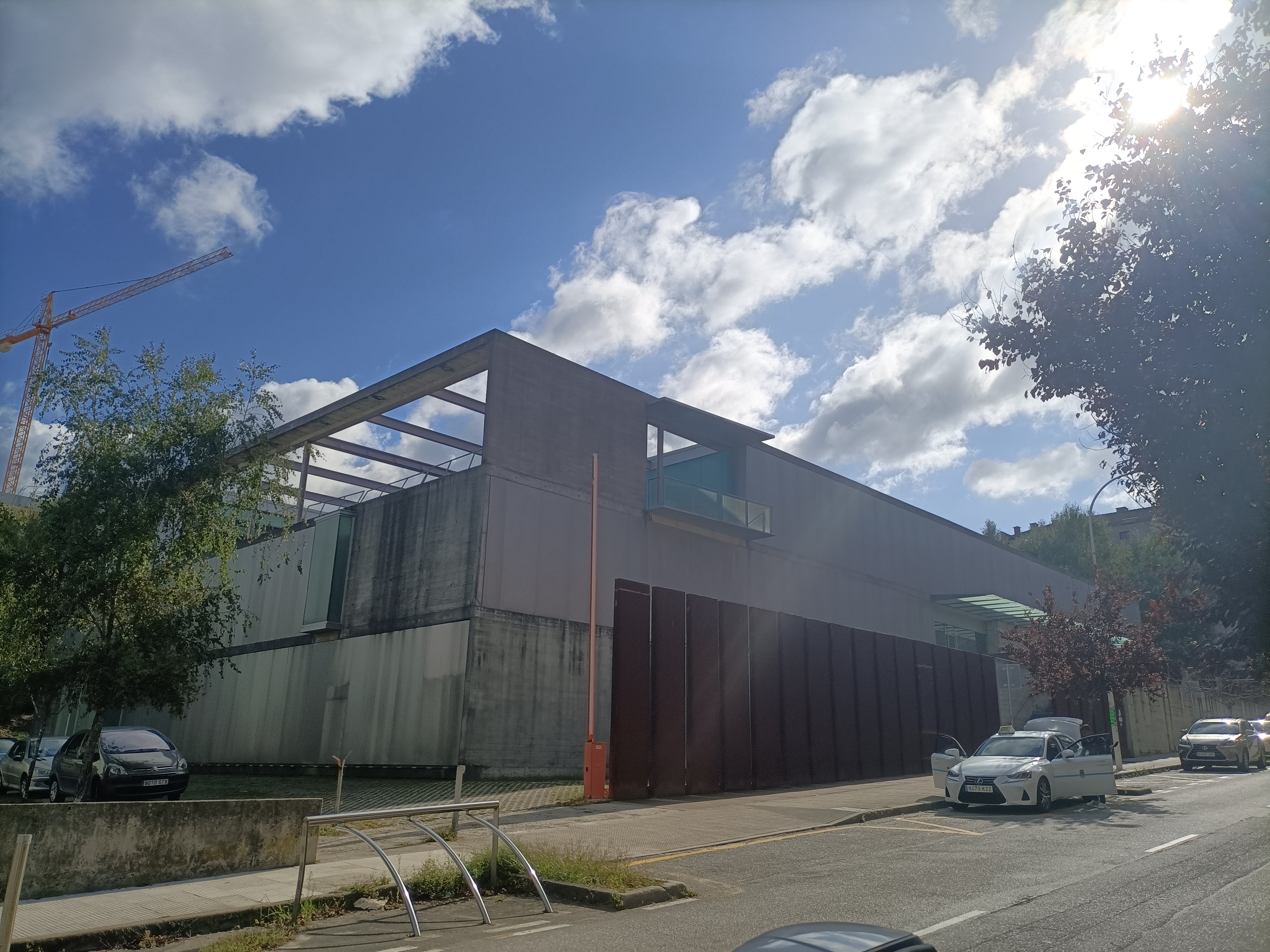
A Parda health centre

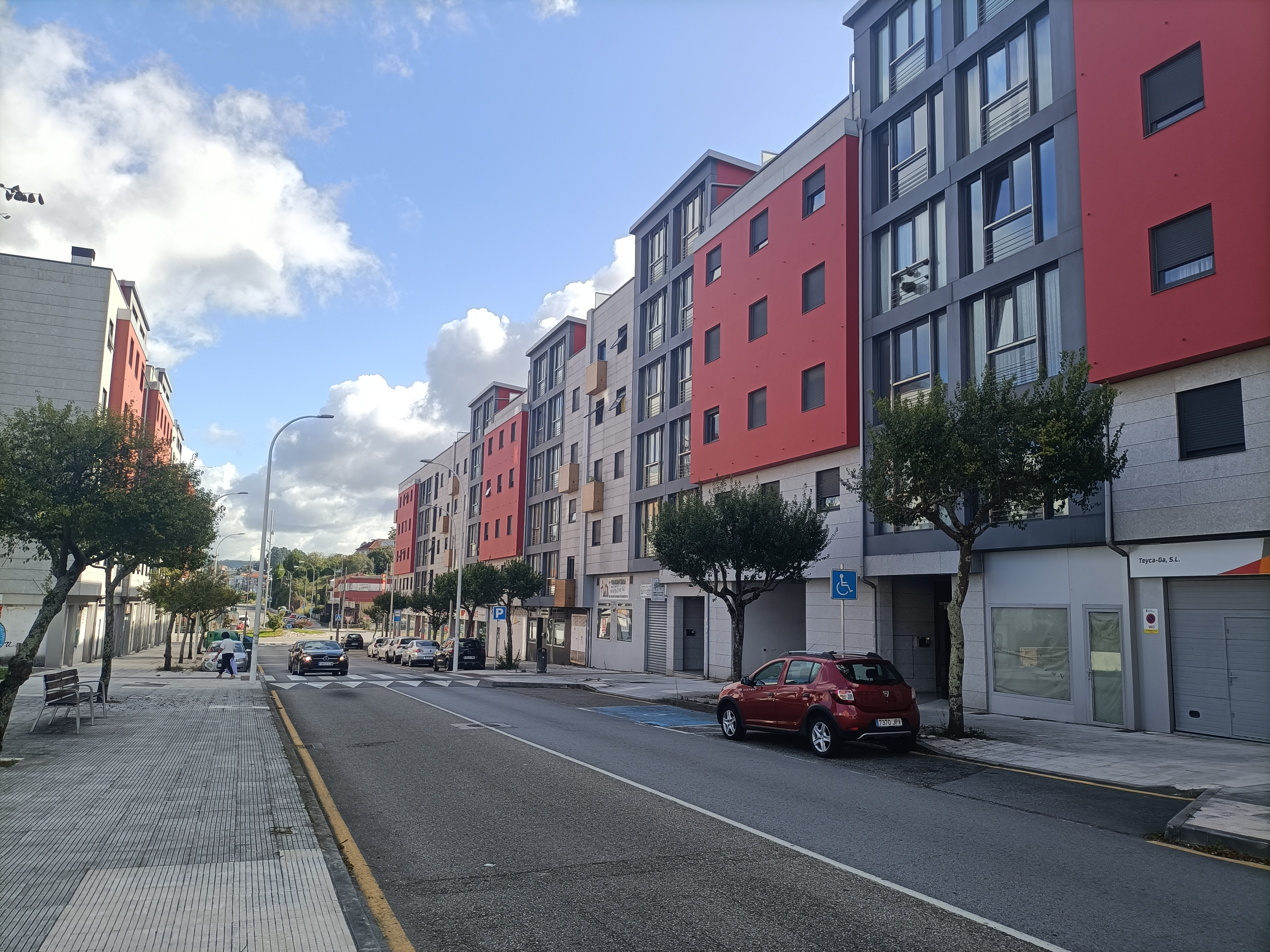
Virxinia Pereira Renda Avenue

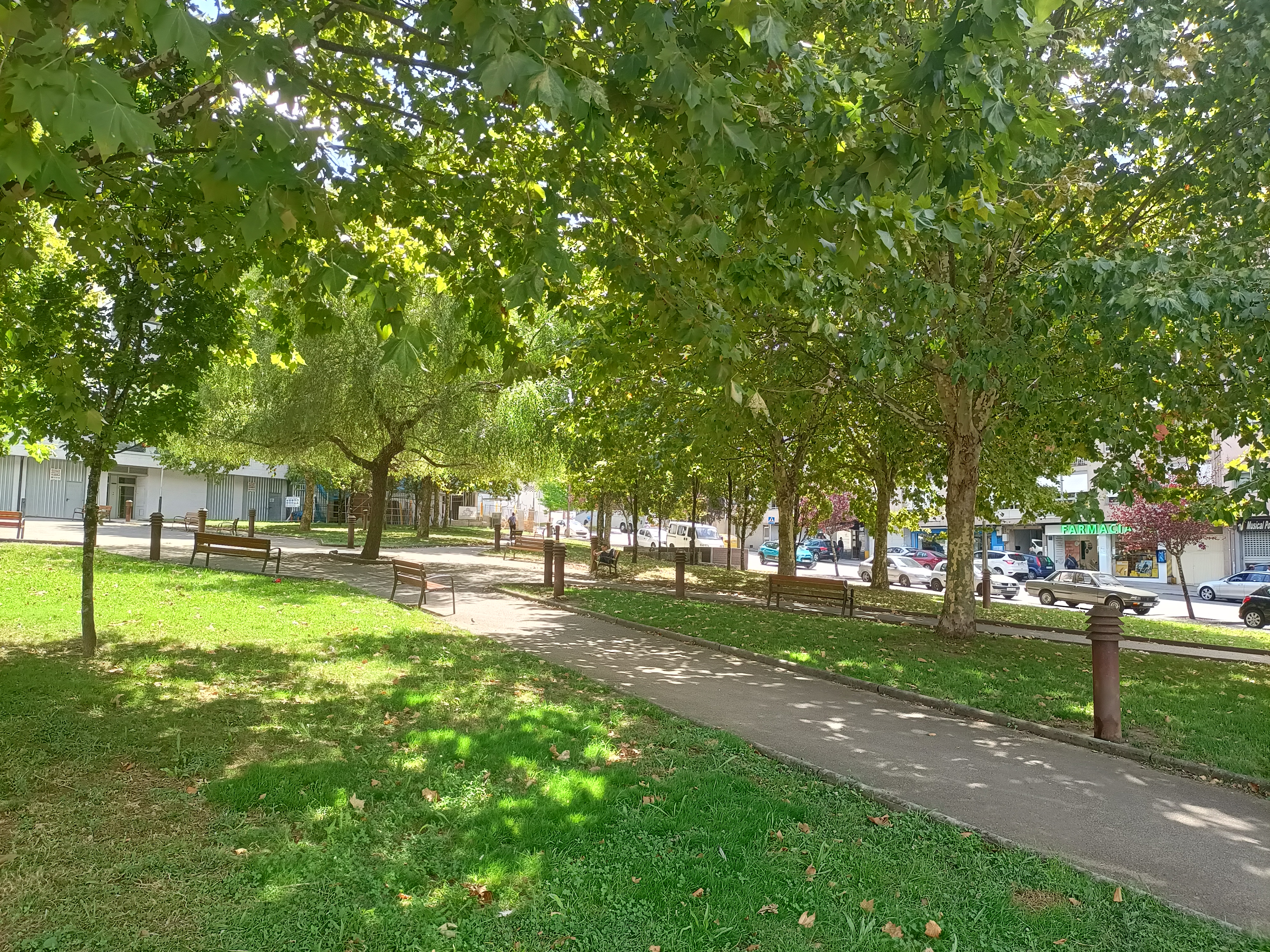
Martín Balea Park

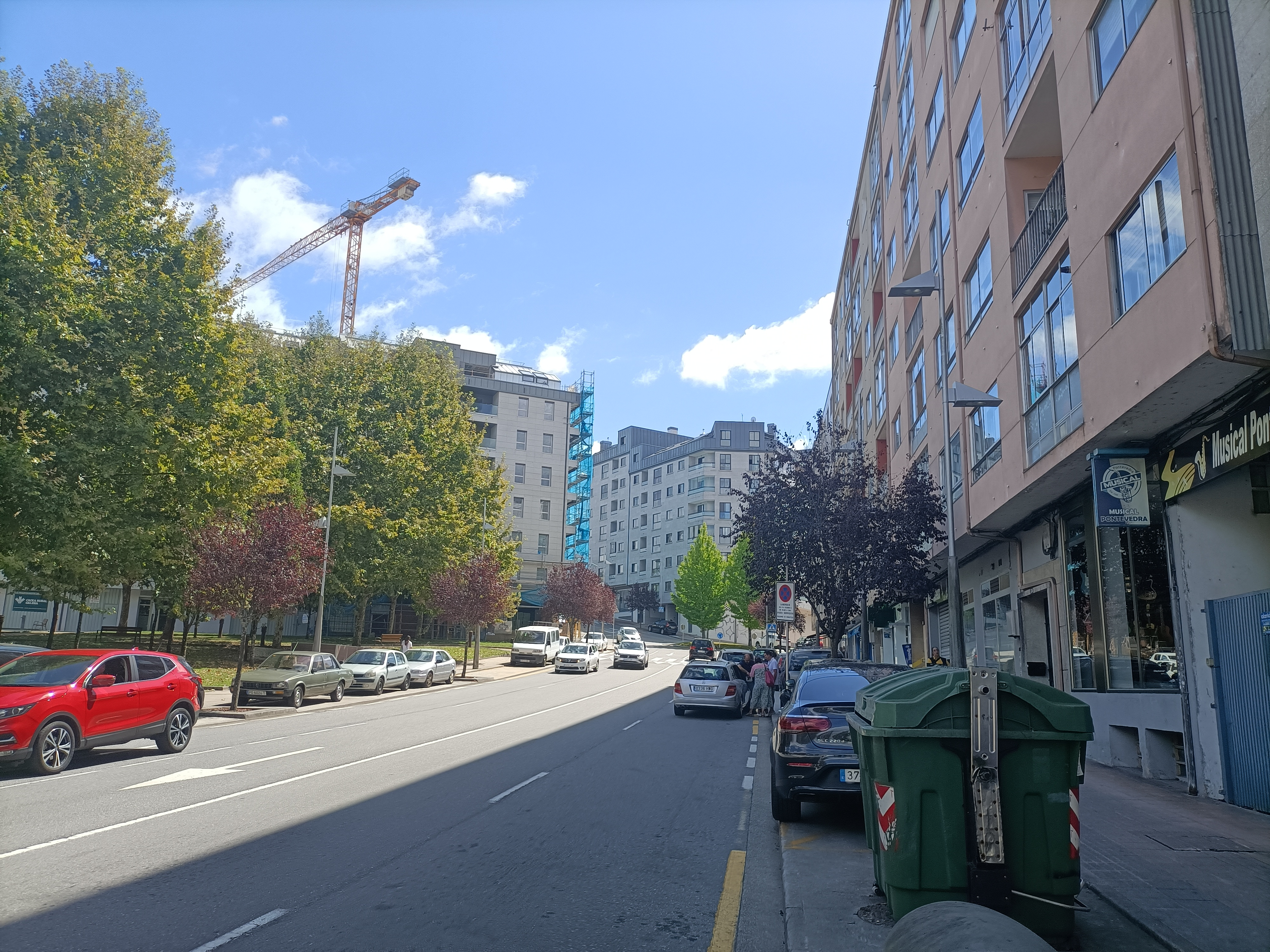
Pintor Laxeiro Street

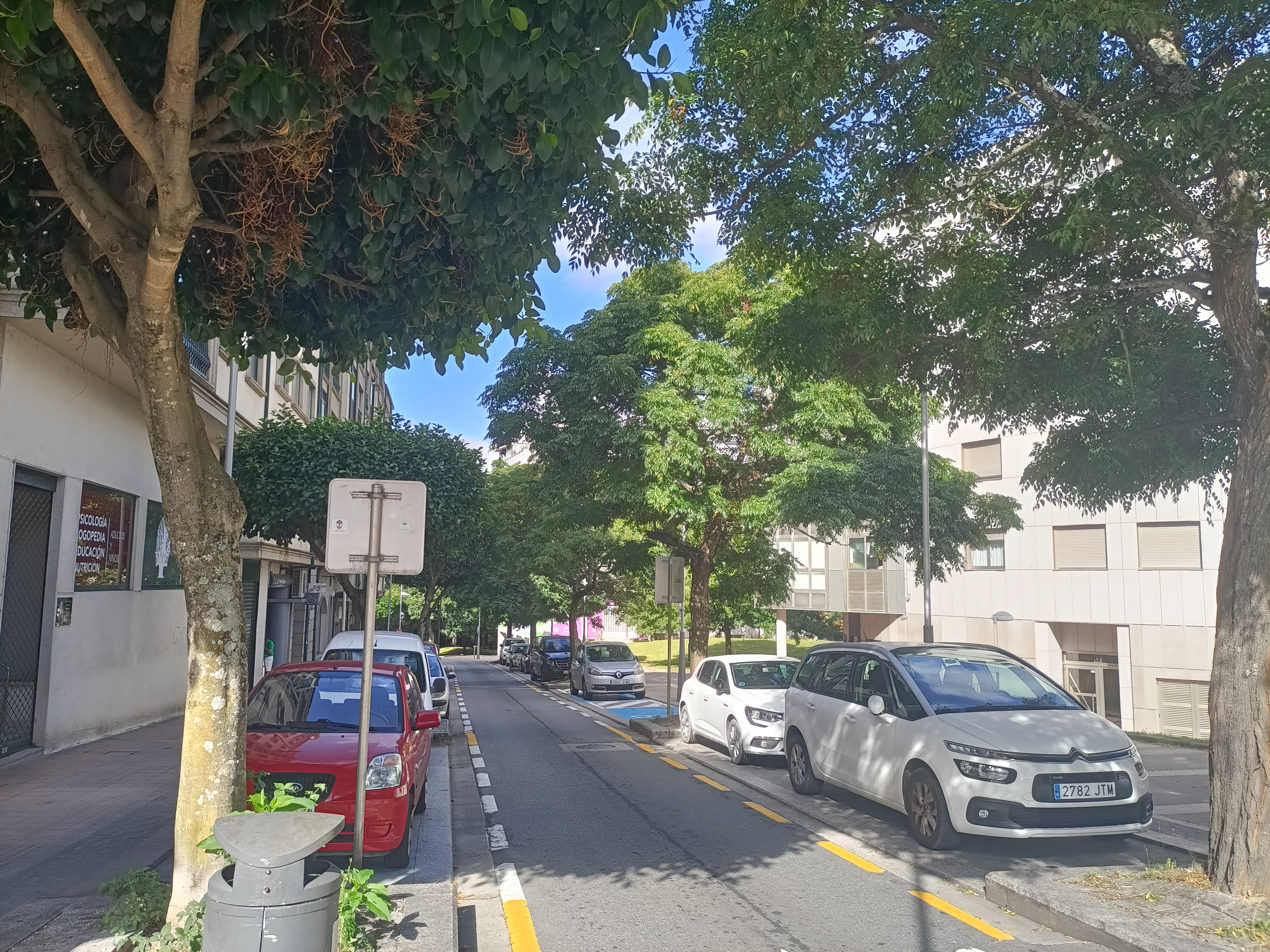
A Estrada Street

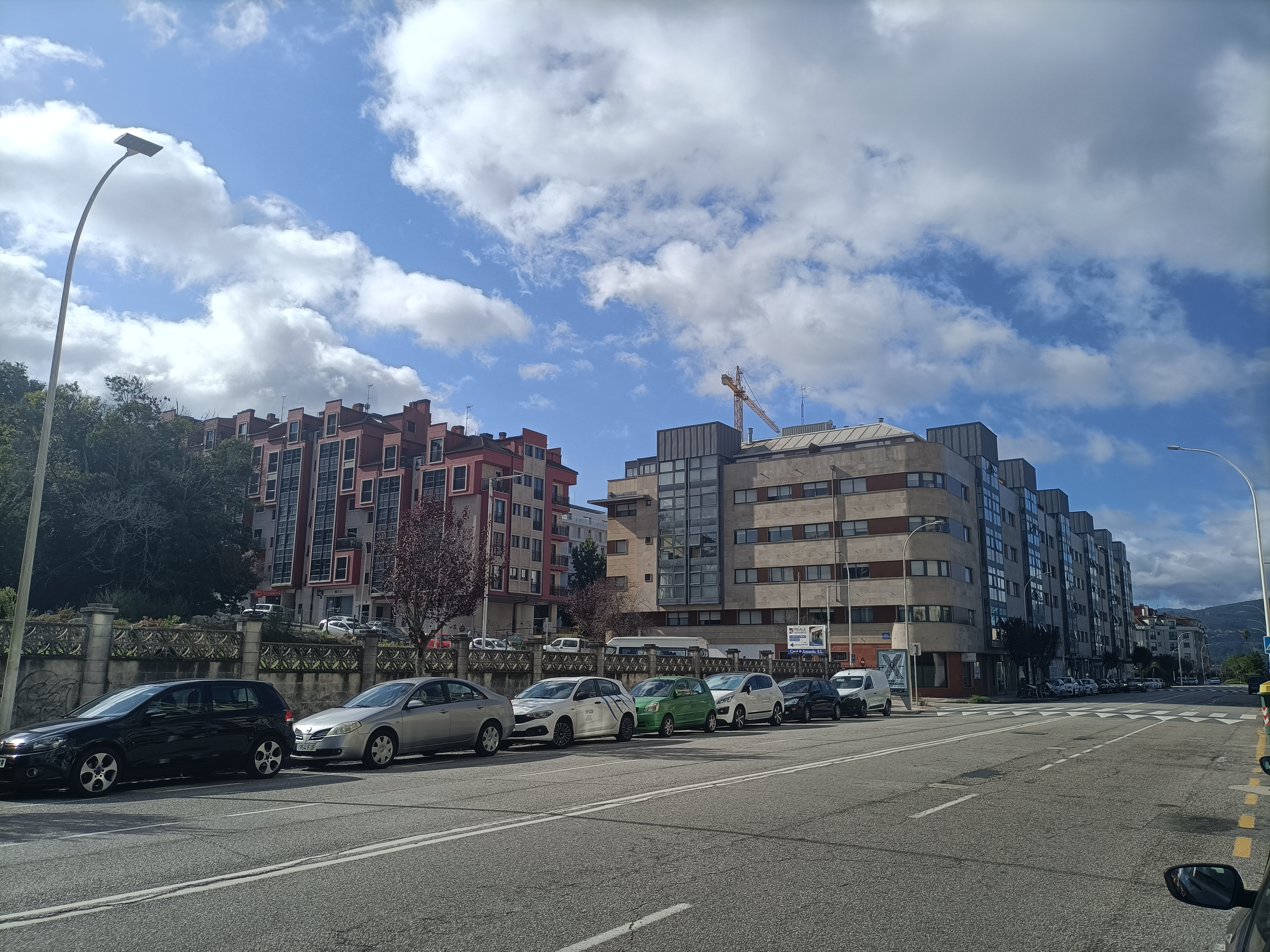
Virxinia Pereira Renda Avenue

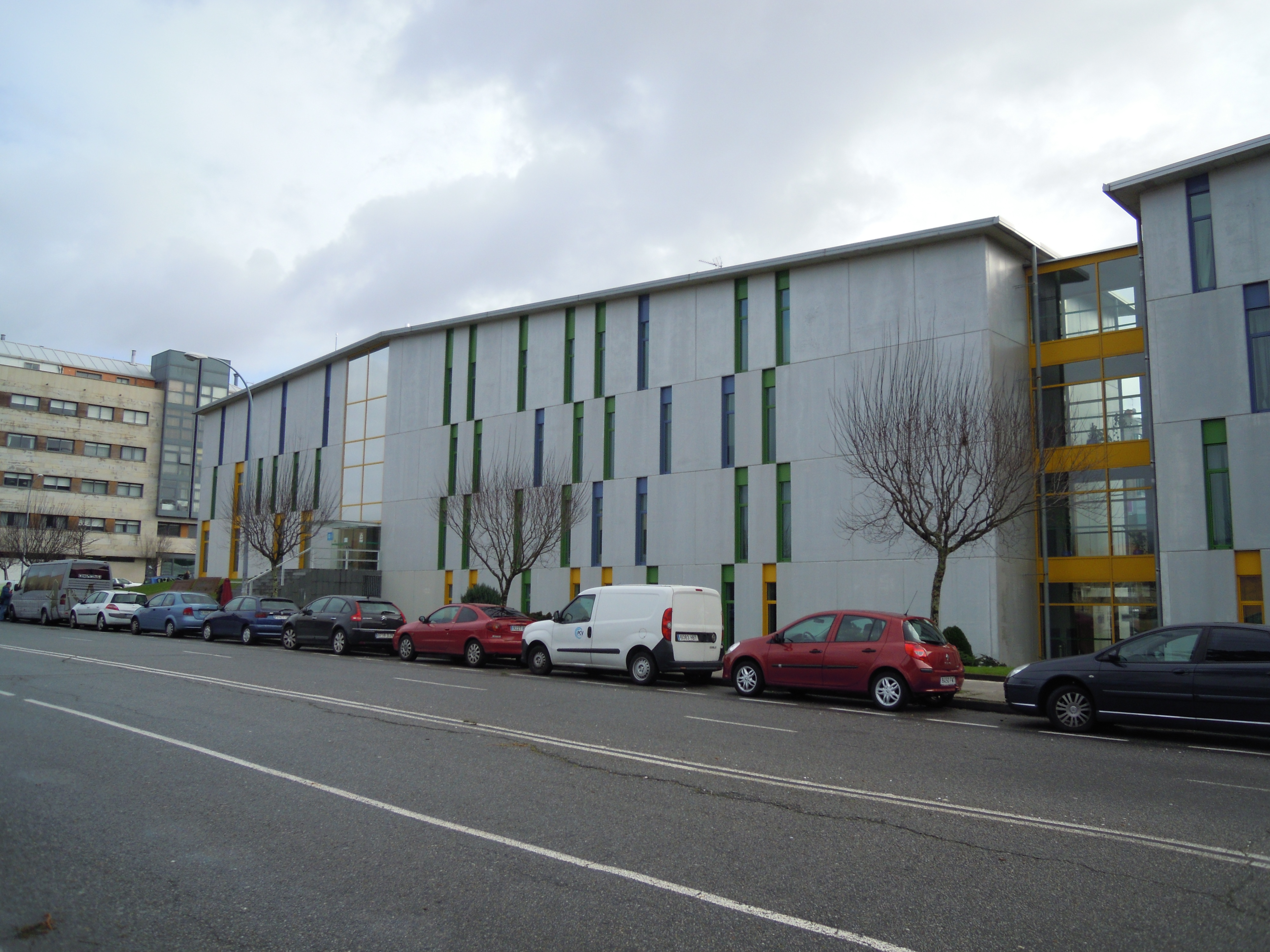
Professional Music Conservatory

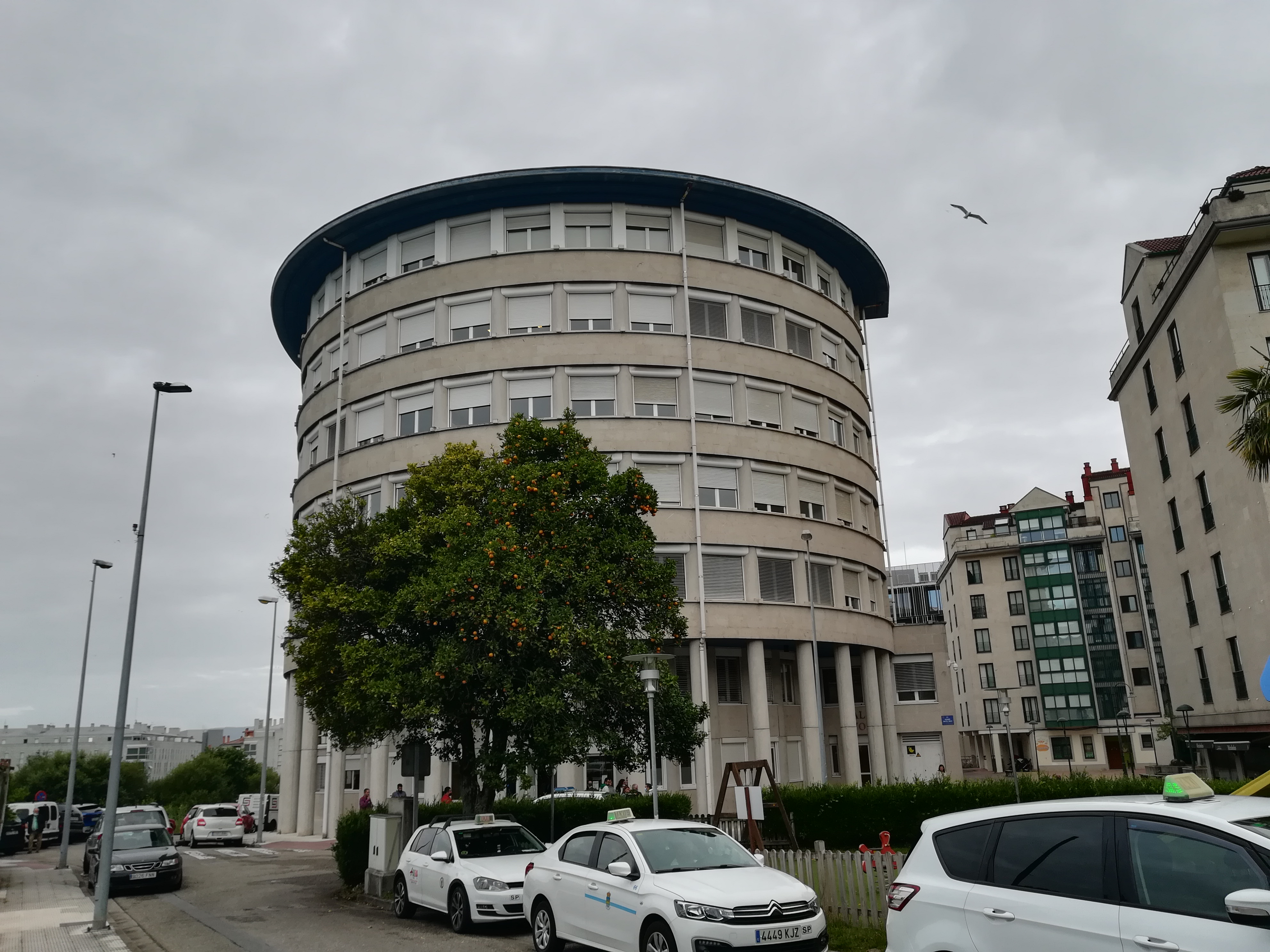
Court Building of 1998 and Fermín Bouza Brey Square

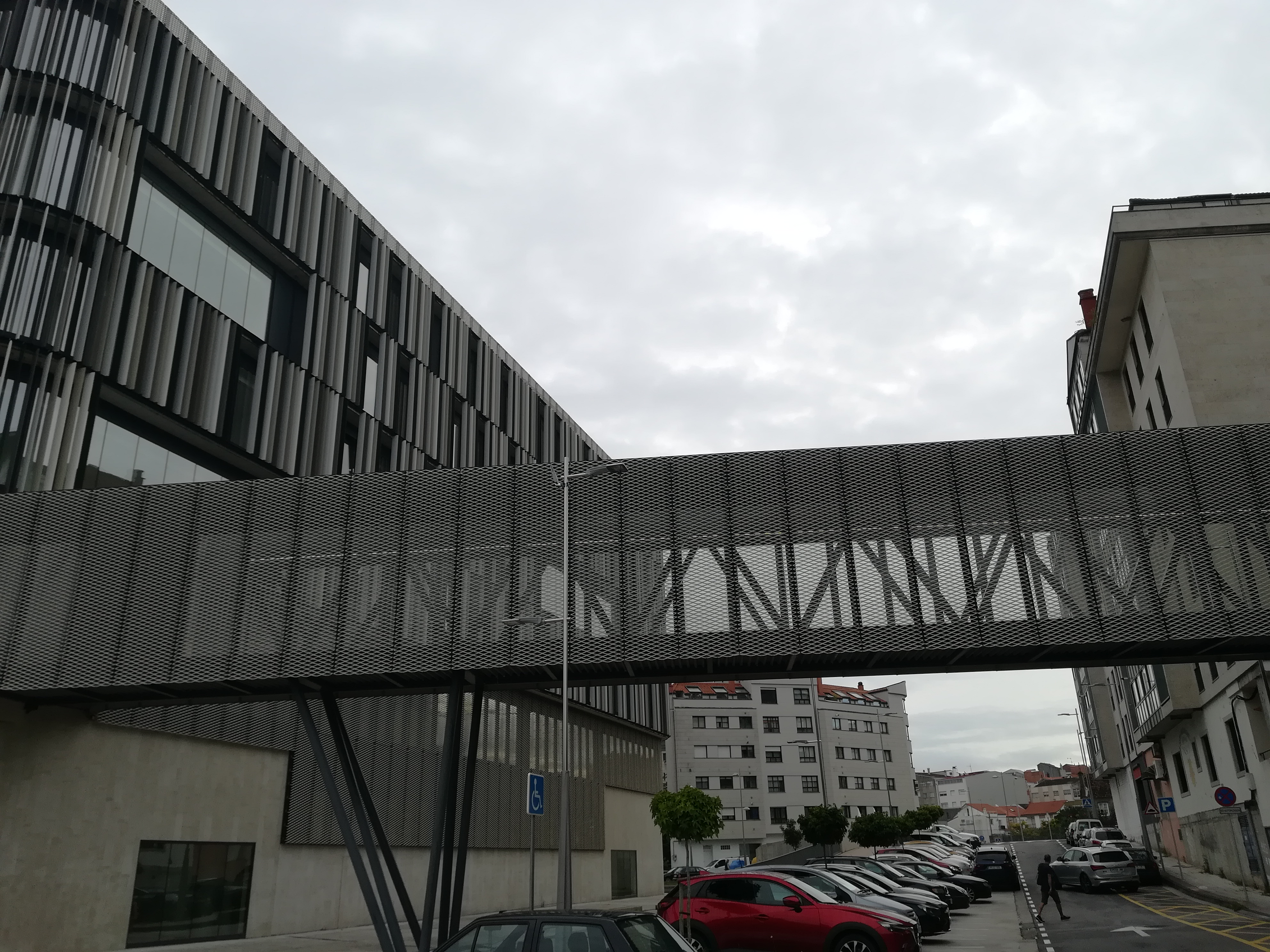
Francisco Tomás y Valiente Street

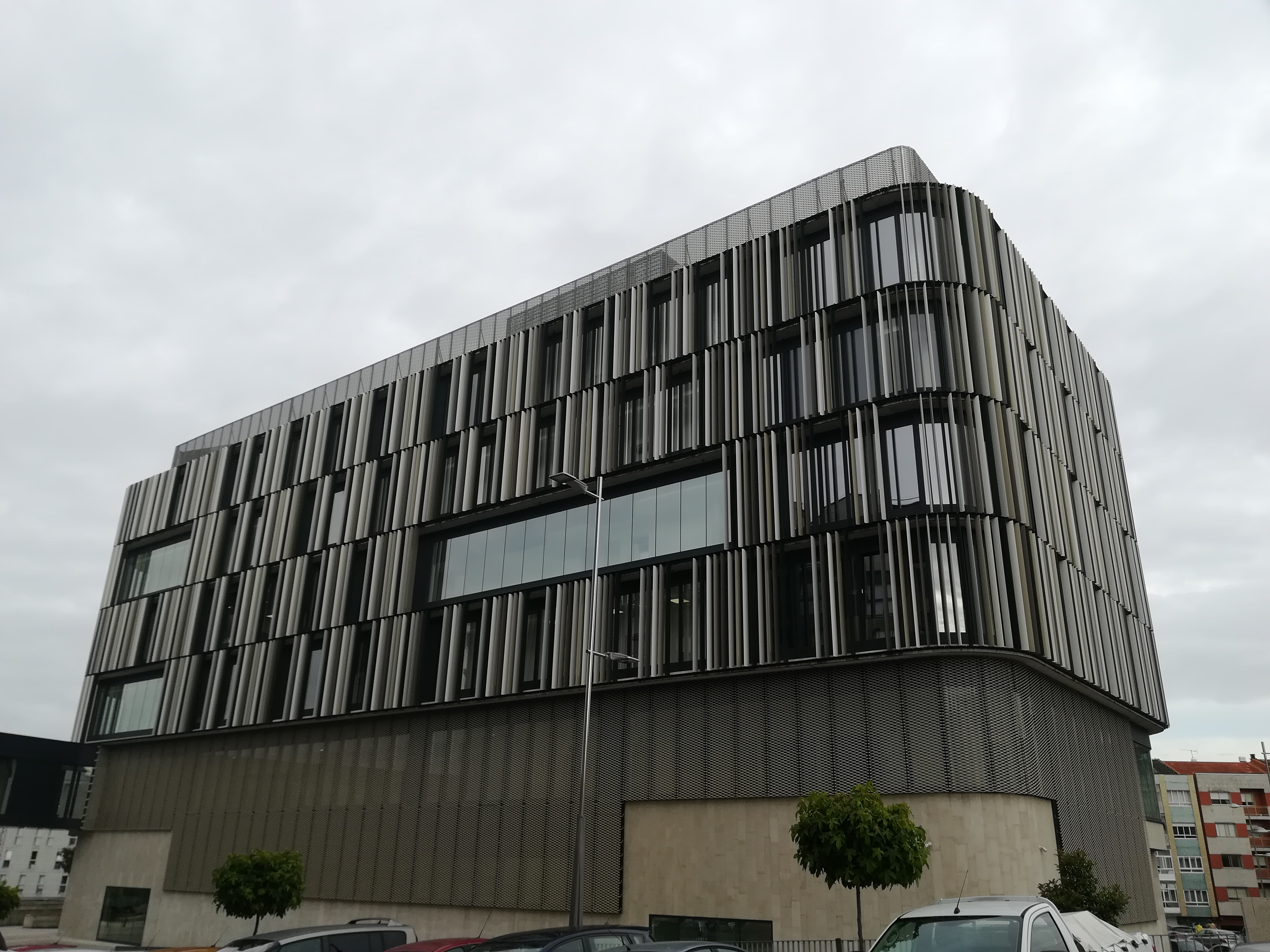
New 2019 Courts building

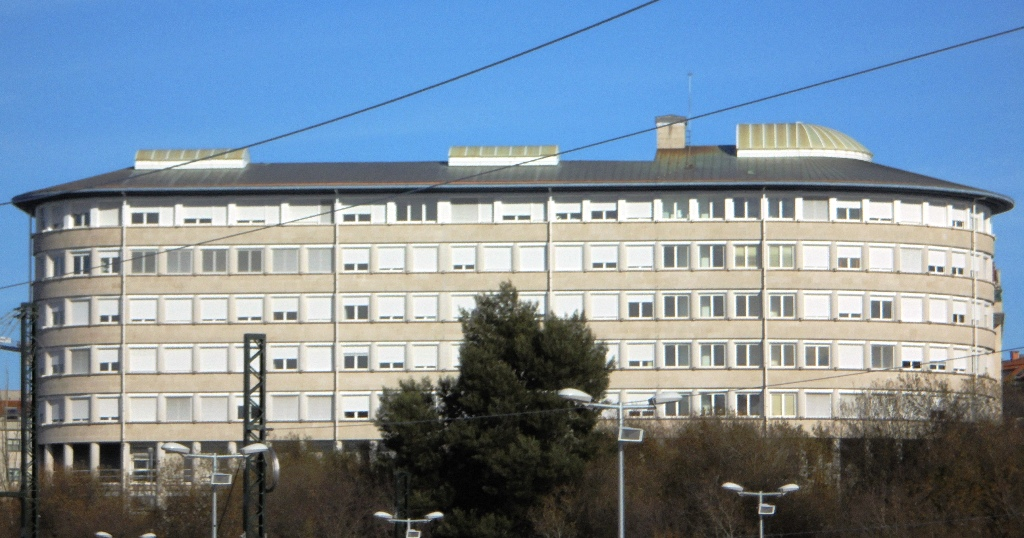
1998 Law Courts

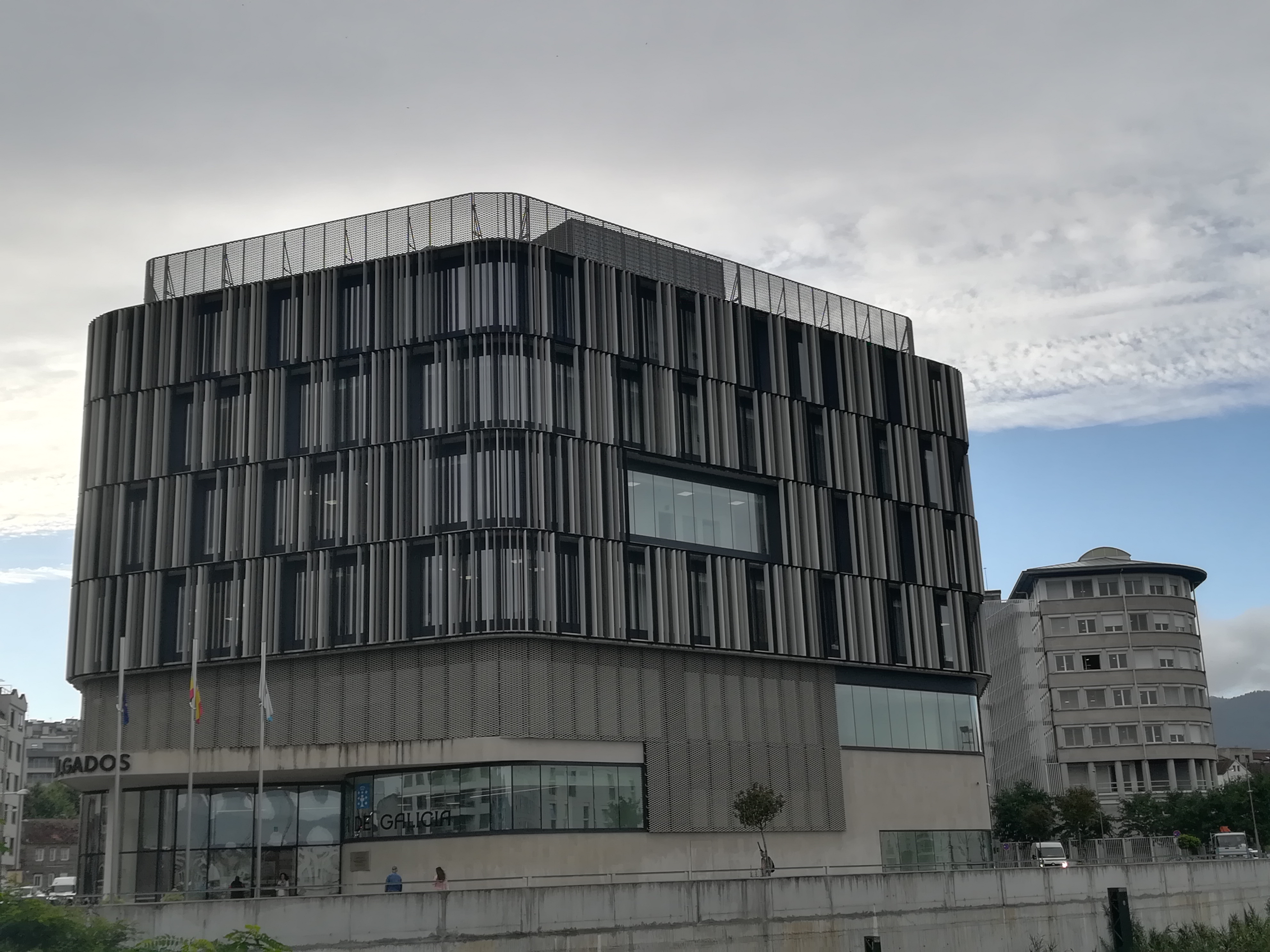
The two buildings of the Judicial Complex of Pontevedra

== See also ==
=== Bibliography ===
- Mateo Sanz, Gonzalo (2020). "La naturaleza en la toponimia española VII". Flora Montibérica (in Spanish). 77. Valencia: FloraMontiberica.org. ISSN 1138-5952.

=== Related articles ===
- Pontevedra Judicial Complex
- Valdecorvos

=== External links ===
- A Parda Health Center – Vier Arquitectos, 2009
- Manuel Quiroga Professional Music Conservatory
