= Alfonso Rus =

Spanish politician

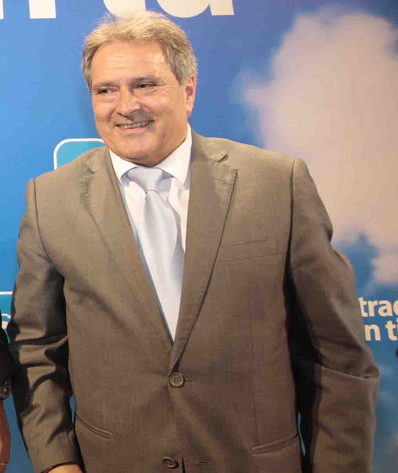
Alfonso Rus Terol in 2011

Alfonso Rus Terol (born October 13, 1950 in Xàtiva, Valencia) is a Spanish politician, mayor of Xàtiva between 1995 and 2015, president of the provincial council of Valencia between 2007 and 2015, president of the People's Party in the province of Valencia between 2004 and 2015 and president of the CD Olímpic de Xàtiva football team.

== Biography ==
Born in Xàtiva on October 13, 1950 to a family of merchants, he became a businessman and was a drummer in several musical groups.

== Corruption ==
On May 2, 2015 he was suspended from membership in the People's Party and removed from the presidency of the party. The reason for his expulsion was the publication in the media of a recording in which he, together with Marcos Benavent, counts money from the collection of an illegal commission, although Rus denied being the person recorded. On January 26, 2016 he was arrested in an operation against corruption at the local and regional level in the Valencian Community along with several dozen people. The Valencia Provincial Court is trying Rus and others in Operation Taula. The Anti-Corruption Prosecutor's Office is asking for eight years' imprisonment for the former president of the provincial council.

In February 2018, a new separate case was opened to investigate Rus and Máximo Caturla. The magistrate investigated the awarding of contracts without respecting the principles of "legality, effective concurrence, impartiality and proscription of arbitrariness" with the aim of "contractually favoring" certain companies.
