= Ciudad de la Justicia de Pontevedra =

Judicial Complex in Pontevedra, Spain

Judicial Complex of Pontevedra
- Ciudad de la Justicia de Pontevedra
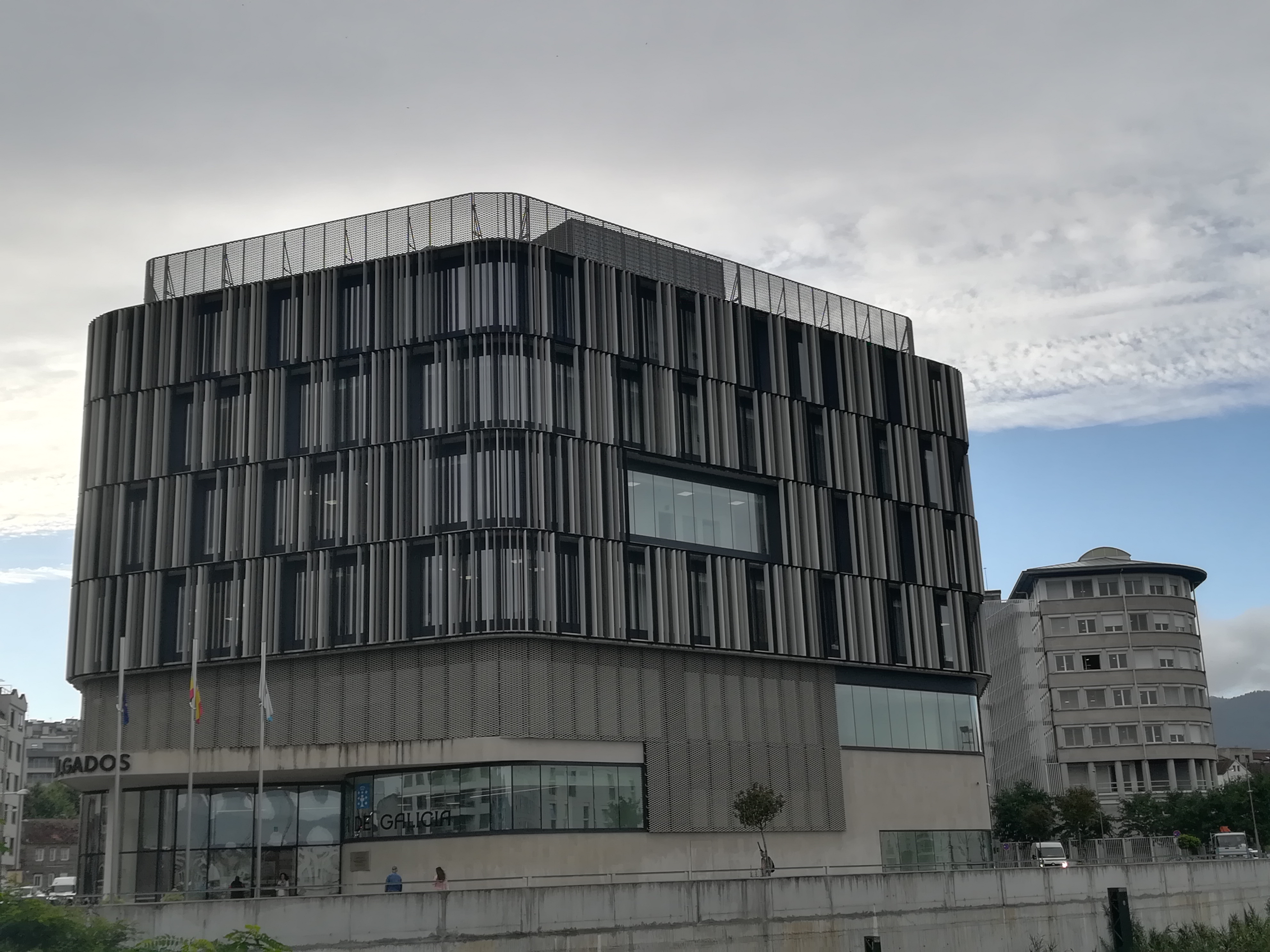
- Buildings of the Judicial Complex, the 2019 building in the foreground and the 1998 building in the background
- Interactive map of the Judicial Complex of Pontevedra area

General information
- Type: Judicial building, Government building
- Location: Pontevedra, Galicia, Spain
- Coordinates: 42°25′31″N 8°38′04″W
- Construction started: May 1996 (first building); August 2016 (second building)
- Completed: February 1998 (first building); August 2019 (second building)
- Opening: 5 March 1998 (first building); 3 September 2019 (second building)
- Owner: Xunta de Galicia; Ministry of Justice

Technical details
- Floor count: 8 (1998 building); 6 (2019 building)
- Floor area: 23000 m2 (2019 building); 15000 m2 (1998 building)

Design and construction
- Architects: Fernando Martínez Sarandeses(1998 building); Gustavo and Lucas Díaz and Naiara Montero (2019 building)

The Ciudad de la Justicia de Pontevedra or the Pontevedra Judicial Complex is an architectural and judicial complex of the city of Pontevedra (Spain), consisting of two large court buildings built in 1998 and 2019 in the A Parda district.

== Location ==
The Judicial Complex of Pontevedra is located to the west of the A Parda district and can be accessed via Hortas and Francisco Tomás y Valiente streets. It is 500 metres from the train and bus stations.

== History ==
Prior to the construction of the first courthouse in the judicial complex in the A Parda neighbourhood, most of the courts were scattered in various buildings in the city of Pontevedra, many of which were rented, so that over time the need to bring all the courts together in a single judicial complex became apparent. Some of the courts were located in the Palace of Justice of Pontevedra, seat of the Provincial Court, inaugurated on 17 September 1956 in Rosalía de Castro Street. In 1948 the city council had ceded the site formerly occupied by the old prison to build the Palace of Justice and in 1954 the Pontevedra Provincial Council contributed one million pesetas to its construction.

After a delay of several years, on 18 April 1995 the project for a new building for the city's courts, designed by the architect Fernando Martínez Sarandeses, was presented. The planned eight-storey building was to be erected behind the Palace of Justice in the Campolongo district, on the site of the present-day Libertad Square. However, in August 1995, the city's mayor, Juan Luis Pedrosa, reached a difficult agreement to build the new court building in the A Parda neighbourhood, on the site of the former provincial prison.

The project kept the design planned for the Campolongo district with some specific modifications to adapt it to the new site of the A Parda district. Work began on 30 May 1996, after the demolition of the old prison, and was completed in February 1998. The new court building was inaugurated on 5 March 1998.

By 2010, this court building was already congested due to lack of space, which highlighted the need to construct a new court building attached to the one inaugurated in 1998. This second courthouse was designed by the architects Gustavo and Lucas Díaz and Naiara Montero and its construction began on 1 August 2016. The new building was inaugurated on 3 September 2019. From that moment on, Pontevedra has a Judicial Complex composed of these two court buildings in the A Parda neighbourhood.

== Description ==
The Judicial Complex of Pontevedra covers a population of 500,000 inhabitants and houses the headquarters of all the existing courts in the judicial district of Pontevedra: Instruction, First Instance, Criminal, Social, Contentious-Administrative, Commercial, Juvenile and Penitentiary Surveillance.

The 1998 building (further south-east with the main entrance in Francisco Tomás y Valiente Street) houses the 4 criminal courts, the juvenile court, the prison surveillance court, the prosecutor's office and the headquarters of the Institute of Forensic Medicine. The 2019 building (with the entrance in Hortas Street) houses the 2 commercial courts, the 4 social courts, the 3 contentious-administrative courts, the 3 instruction courts and the 5 courts of first instance. For its part, the seat of the Provincial Court of Pontevedra (Audiencia Provincial), its presidency and its sections 1, 2, 3 and 4 are located in the Palace of Justice in the city centre, at 5 Rosalía de Castro Street, one kilometre from the Judicial Complex in the A Parda district.

== Architecture ==
The two court buildings in the Pontevedra judicial complex are linked by a 40-metre long glass walkway on the first floor.

The court building built in 1998, has eight floors. The oblong façade is clad in stone and is distinguished by the continuity of the many windows arranged symmetrically on all facades. The consecutive windows on all floors cover most of the building's facades and let a lot of light into the interior. The building is surrounded by tall columns on the first two floors on the south, east and west façades, which act as an entrance portico.

The new court building built in 2019 has two basements and six floors and has a capacity of 28 courts. It has an area of 23,000 square metres. The building, with open spaces, has an irregular hexagonal shape and is centred around a large courtyard lit from above by skylights. The façade is designed with serial openings and bevelled planes with vertical slats that protect the glass walls from the sun. On the first two floors, the façade is clad in stone. Inside, on the ground and 1st floors, which share a large hall, are the registry office, 16 courtrooms with natural light, a large wedding hall and offices for lawyers, solicitors and social workers, and on the other floors, the courts.

The Palace of Justice, located in the centre of the city and built in 1956, designed by the architects Robustiano Fernández Cochón and Germán Álvarez de Sotomayor y Castro, has a rectangular floor plan, four floors and a semi-basement. The façade is made of stone. The ground floor is surrounded by bossages and on the second and third floors, the west and east facades are plastered with lime mortar around all the windows and balcony doors of the entrance facade. The sober and austere style reflects the seriousness of its function.

== Gallery ==
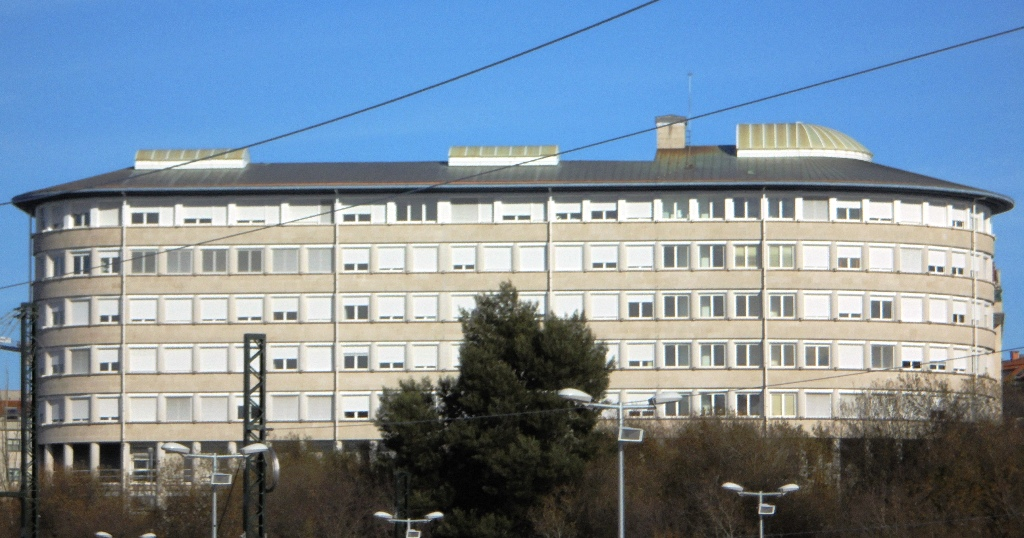
Court building built in 1998

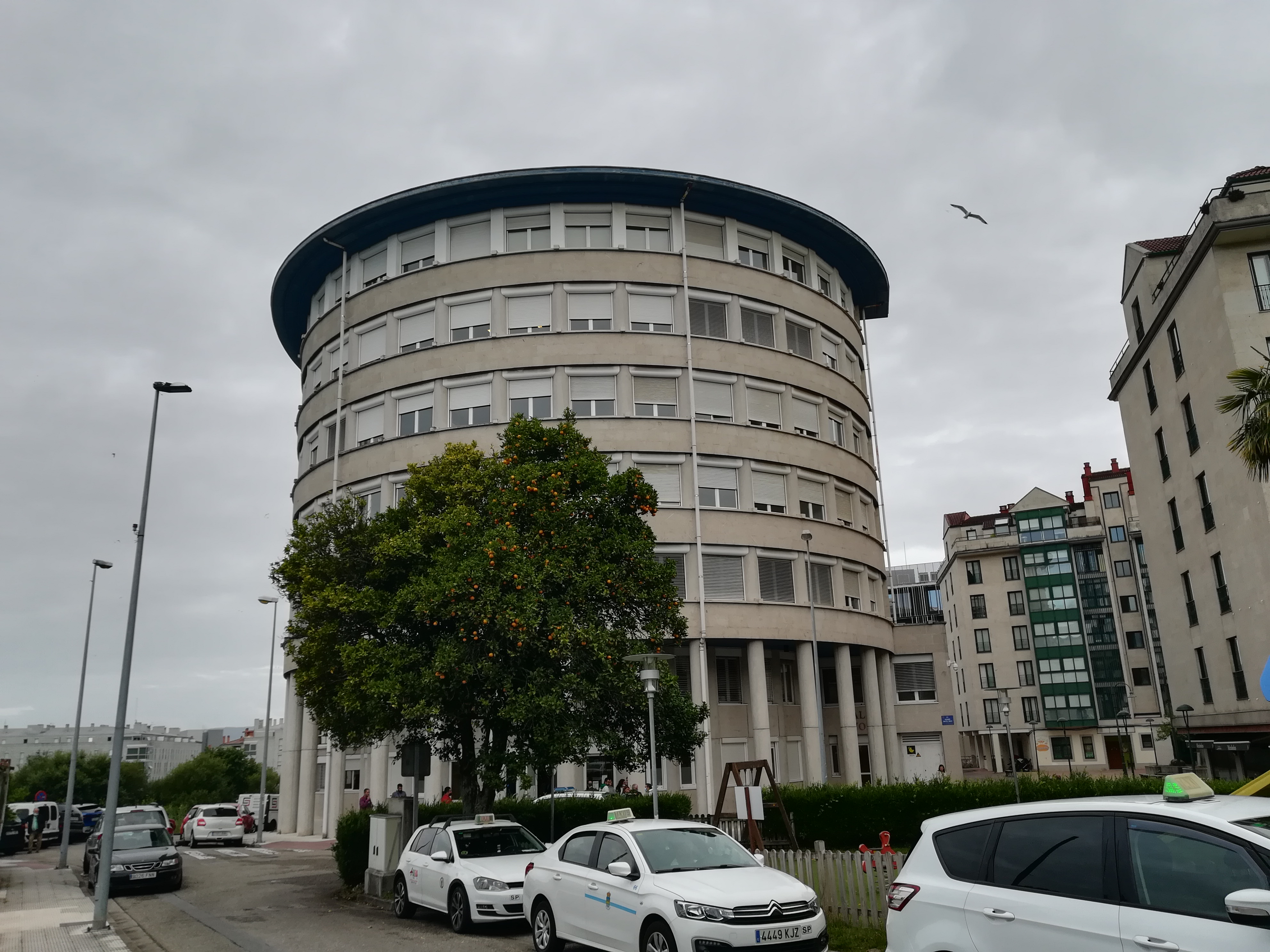
Entrance to the 1998 building

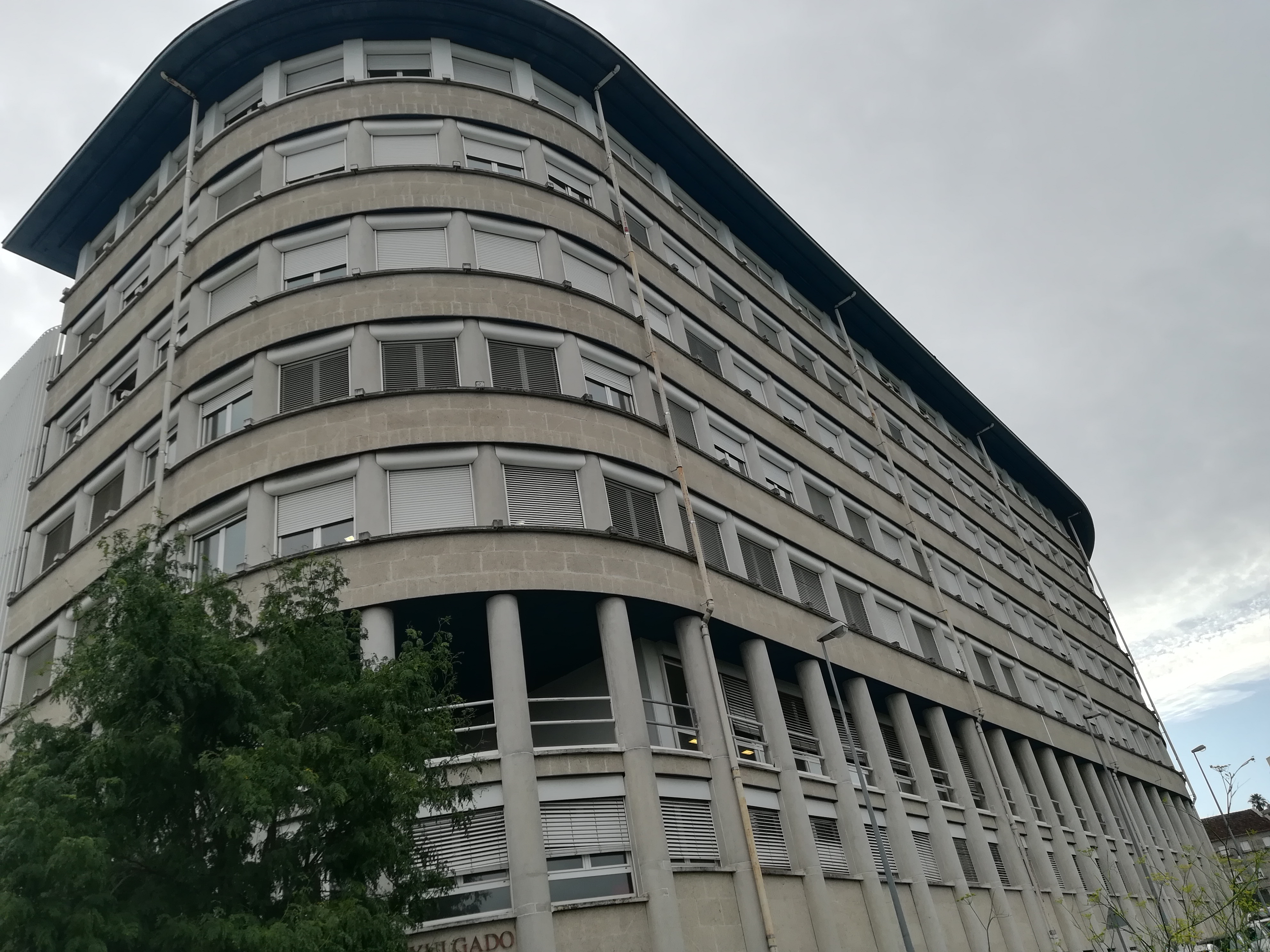
South facade of the 1998 building

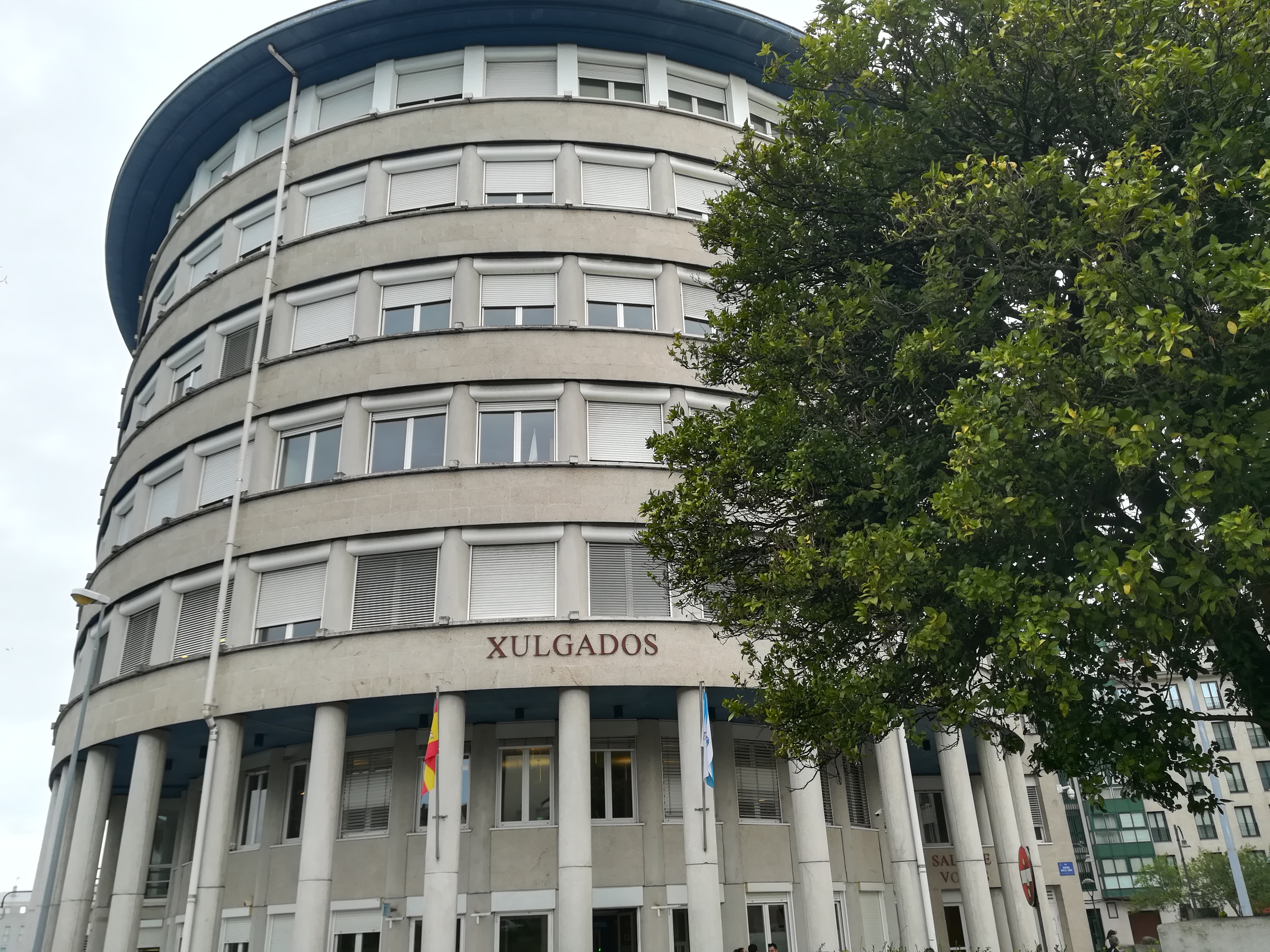
Detail of the entrance to the building in 1998

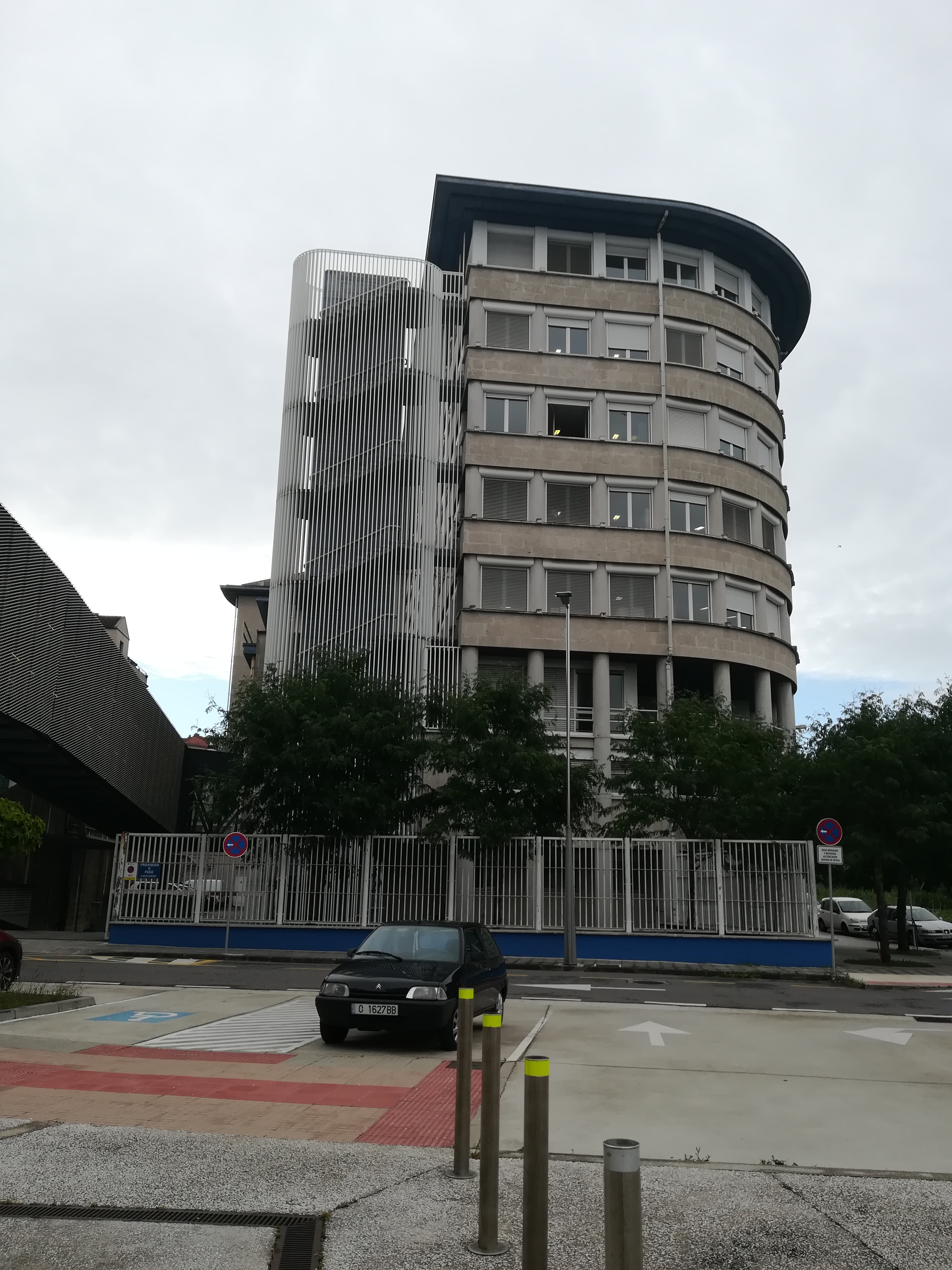
1998 building, north façade

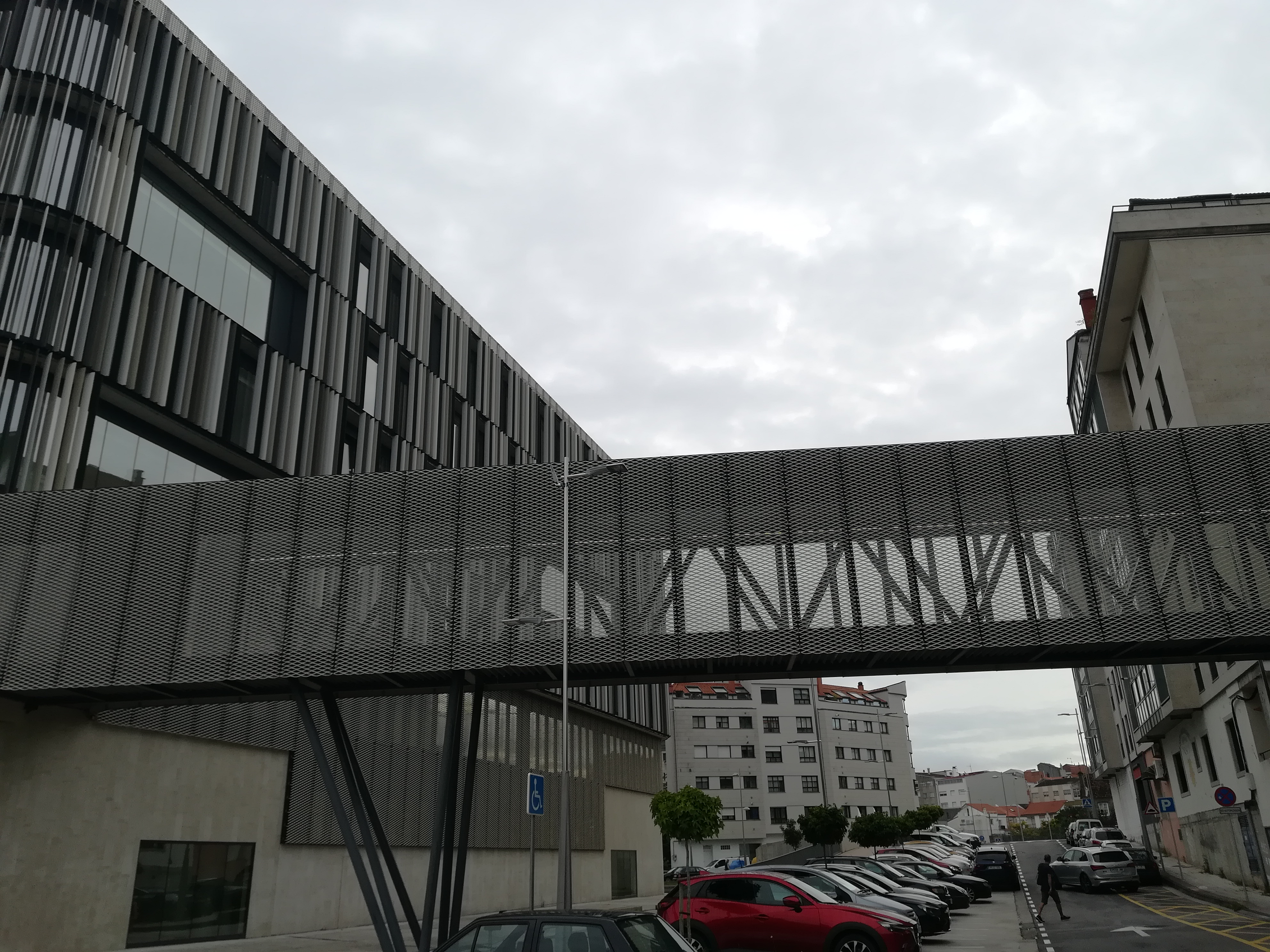
Glass walkway linking the two buildings

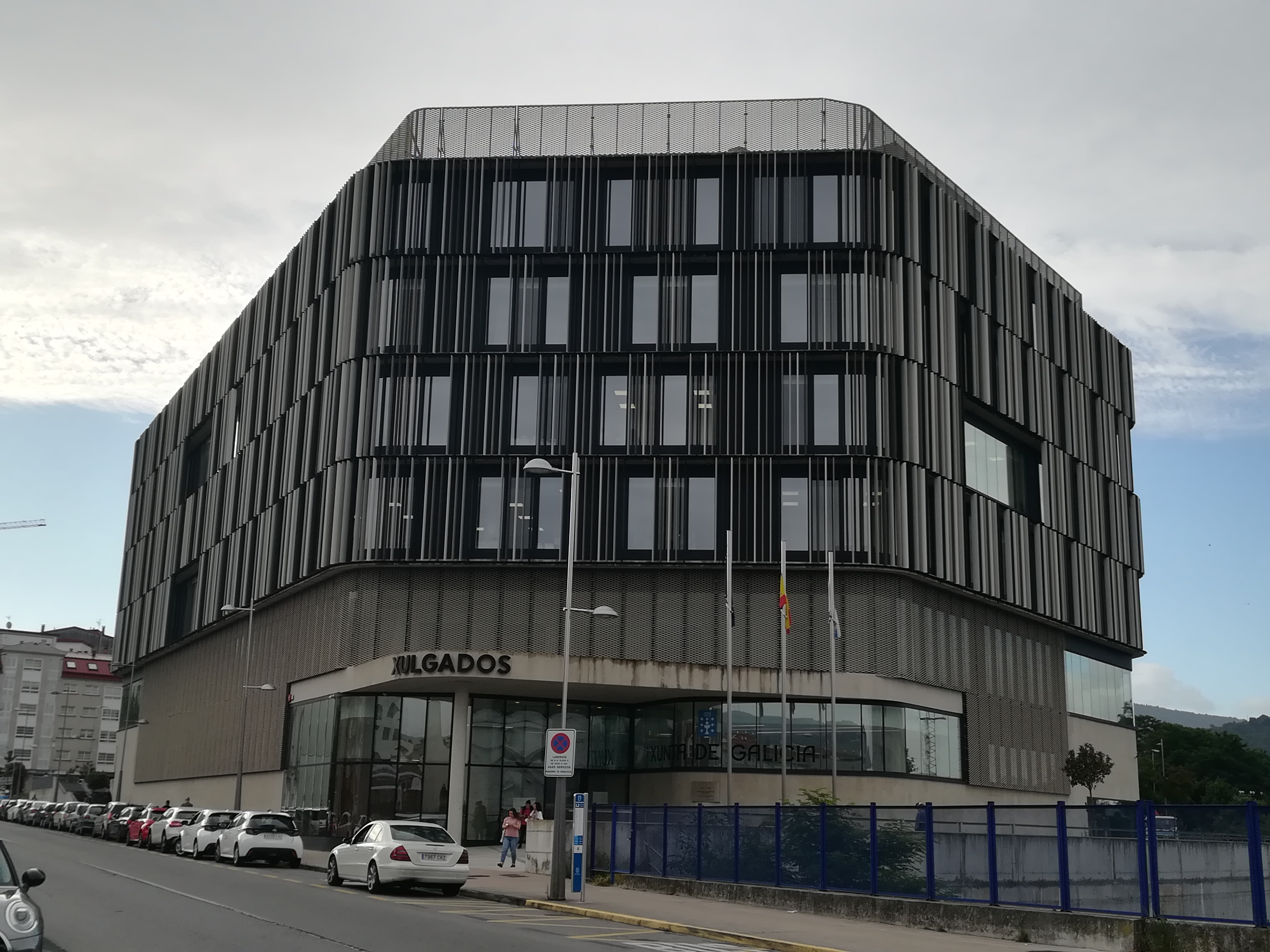
Court building built in 2019

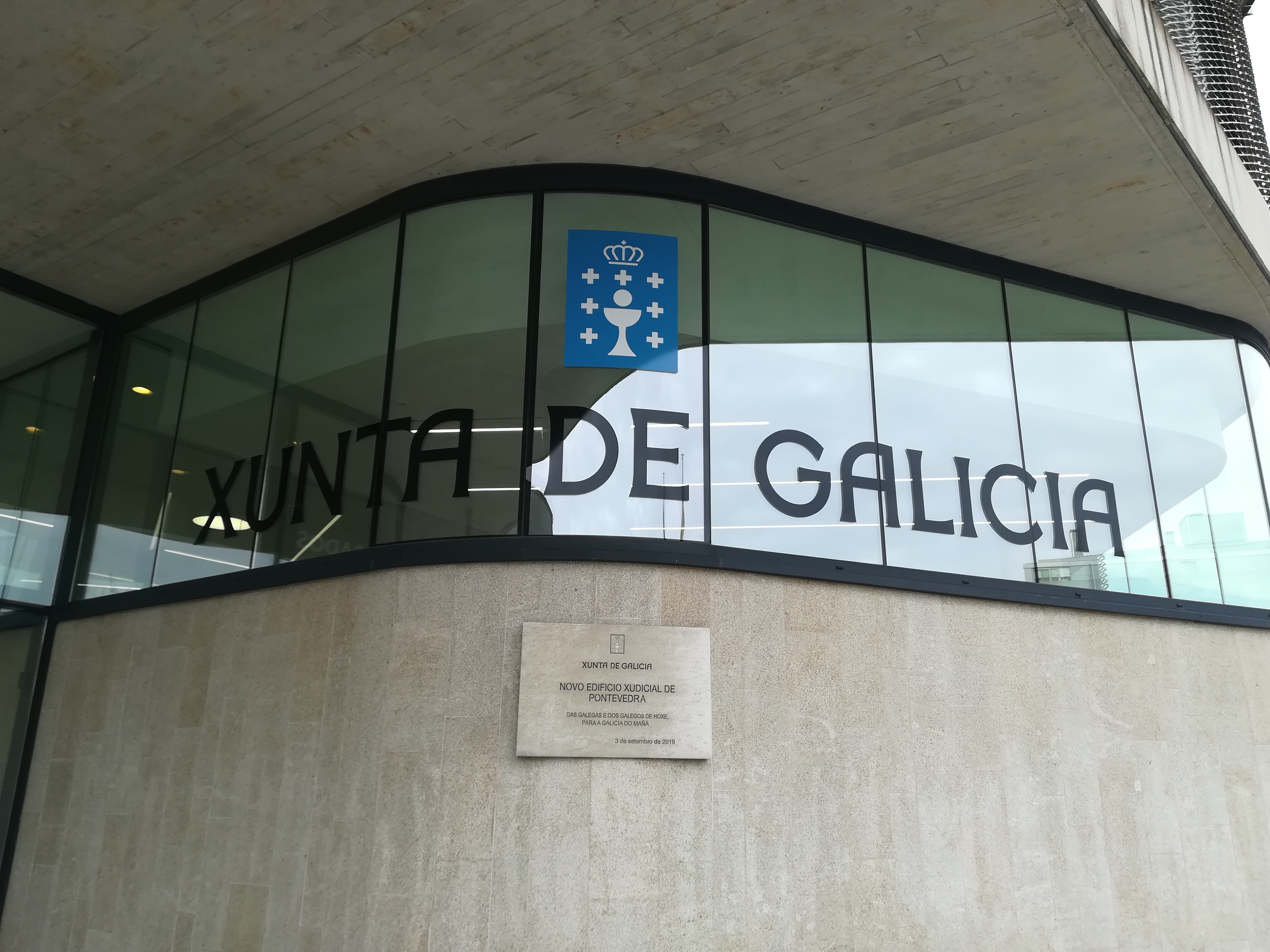
Plaque of the new building

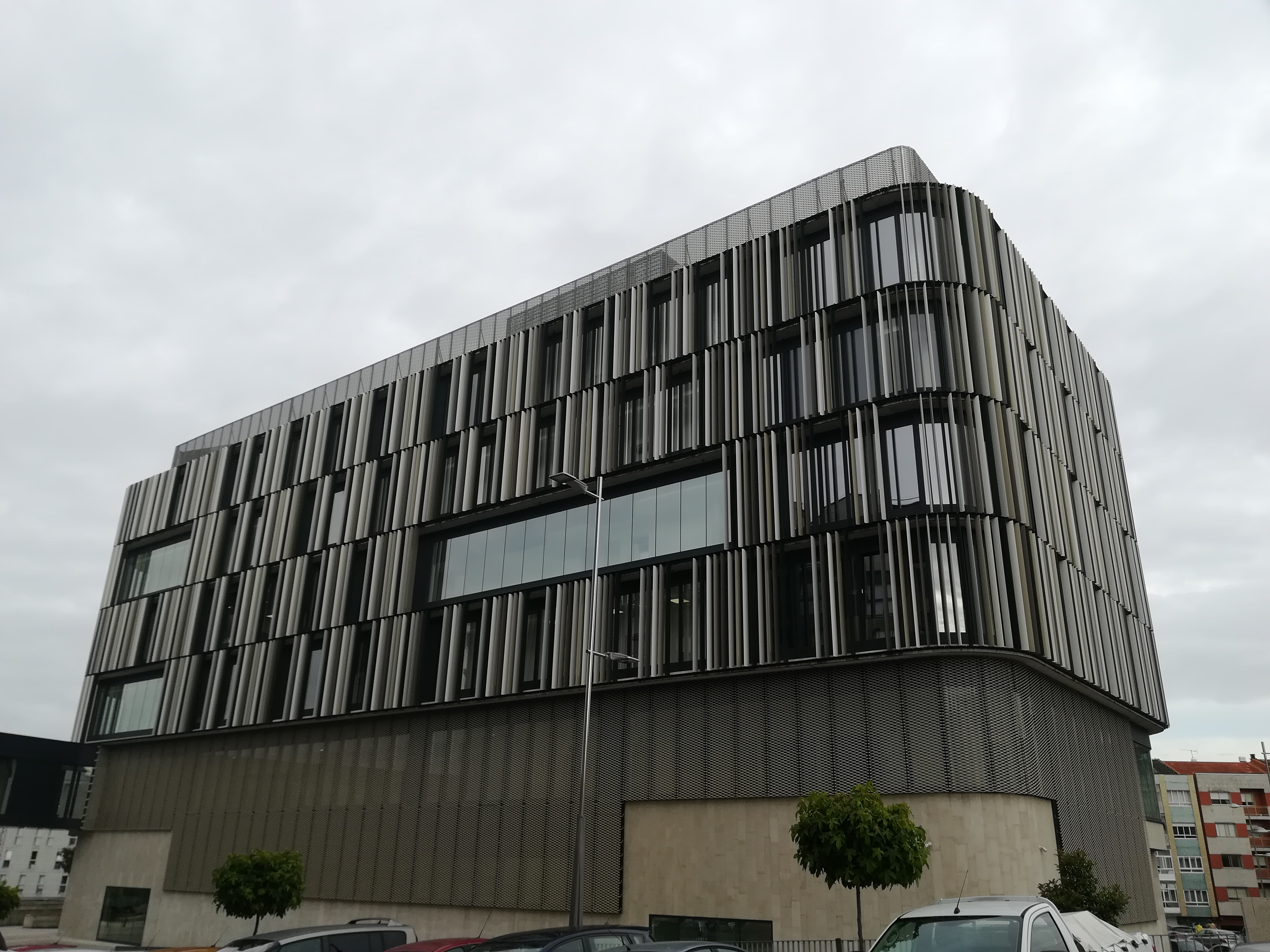
North-east facade of the new building

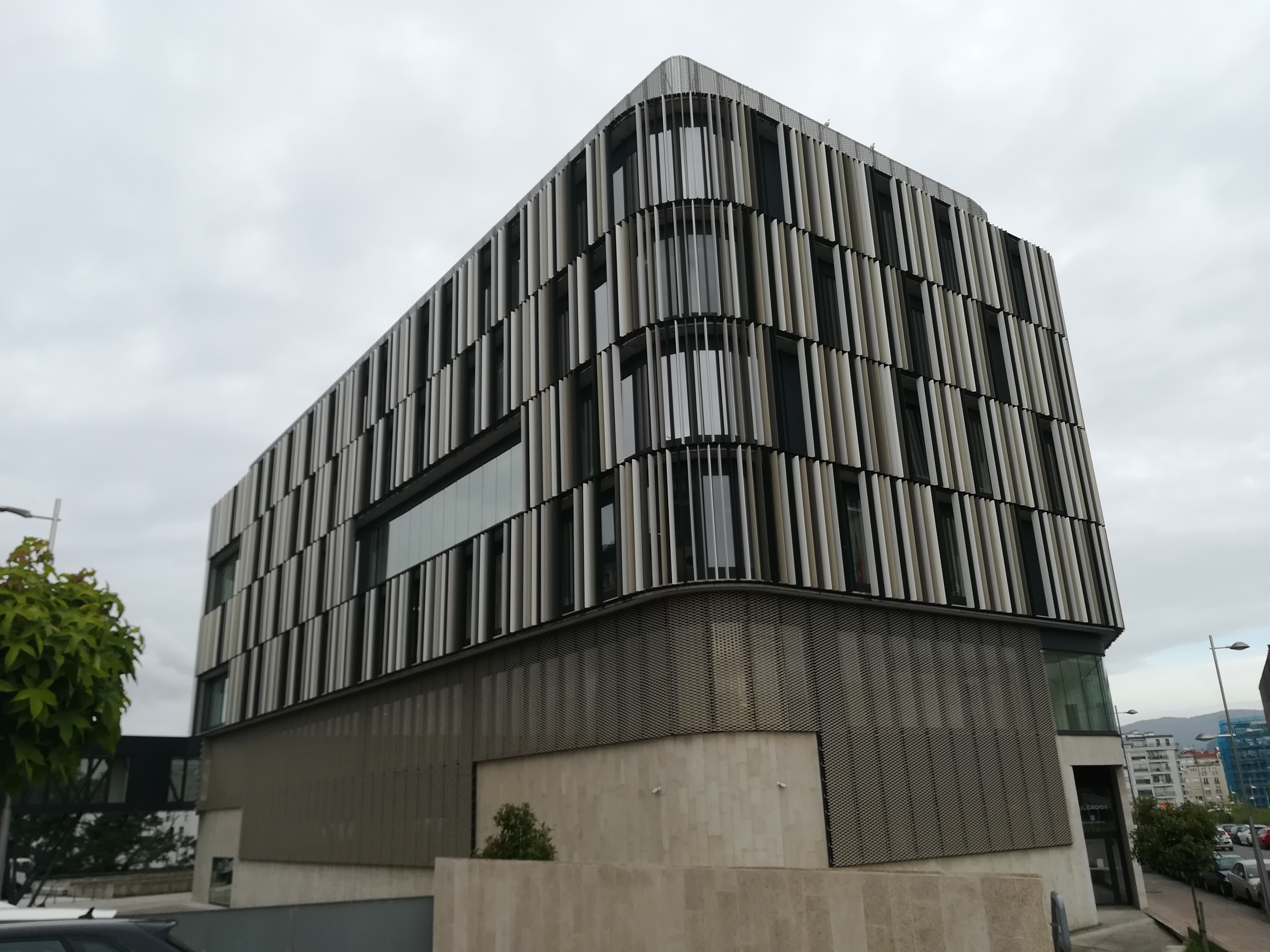
New building

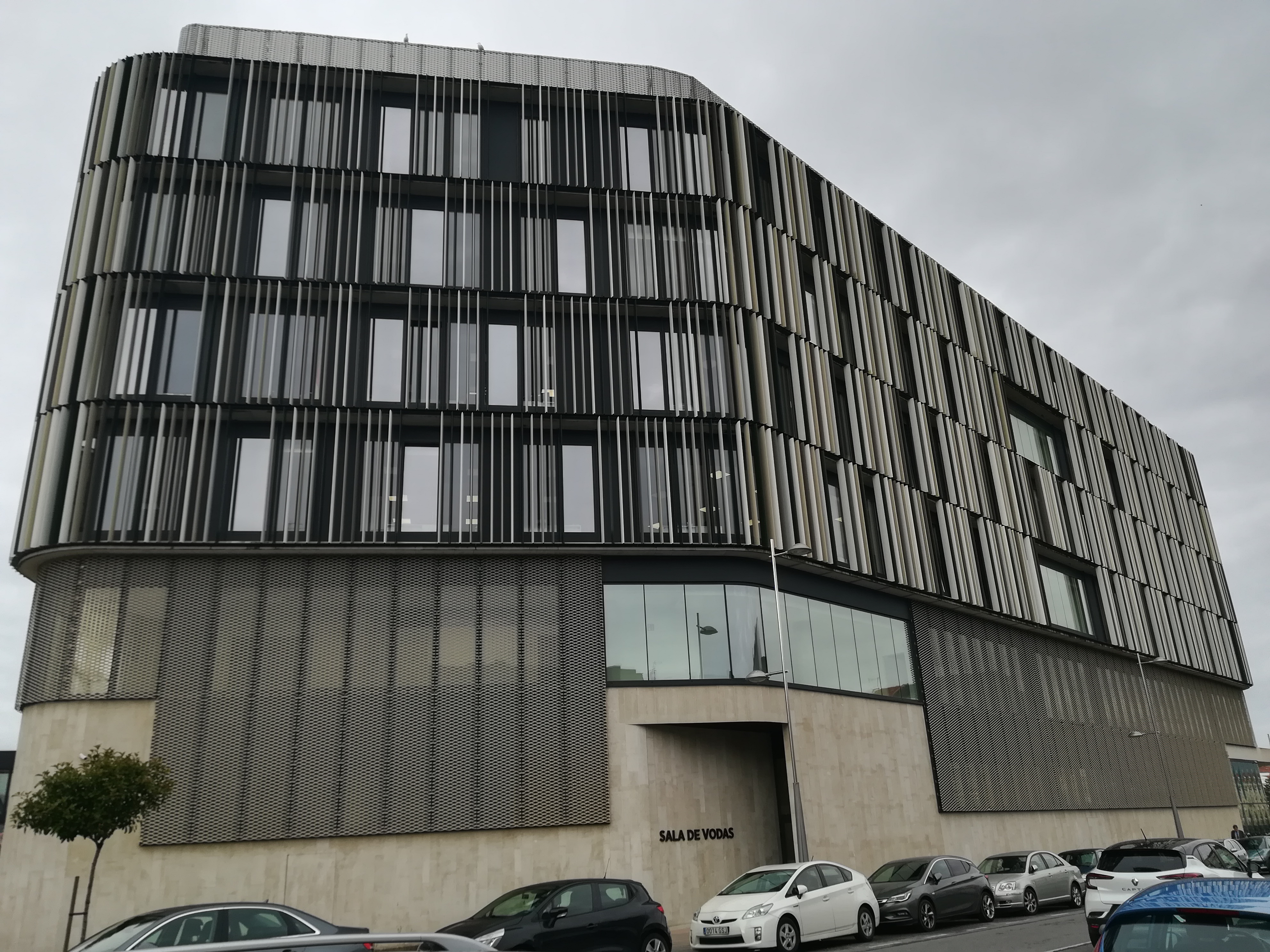
Entrance to the wedding hall

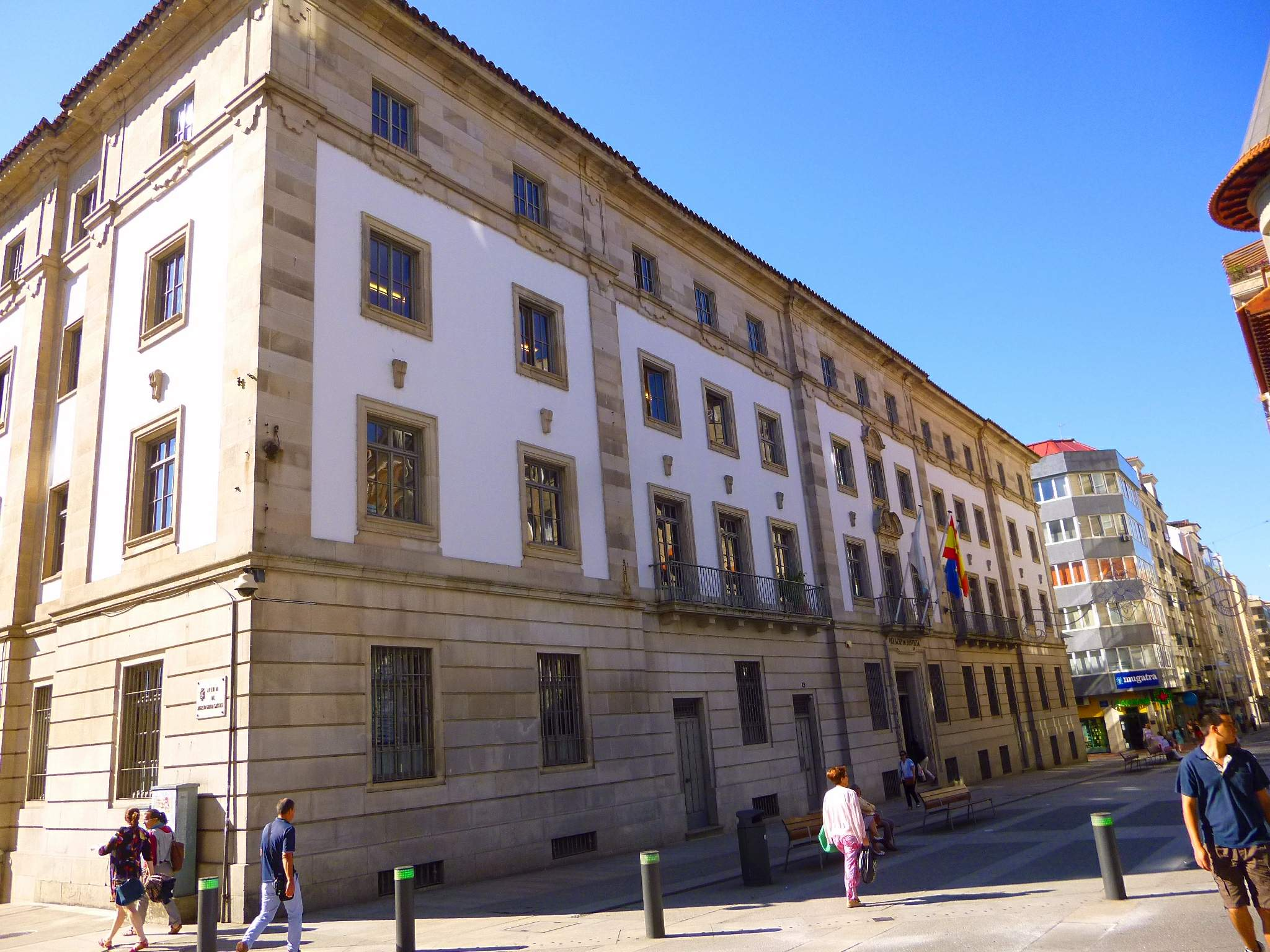
Palace of Justice 1956, main façade

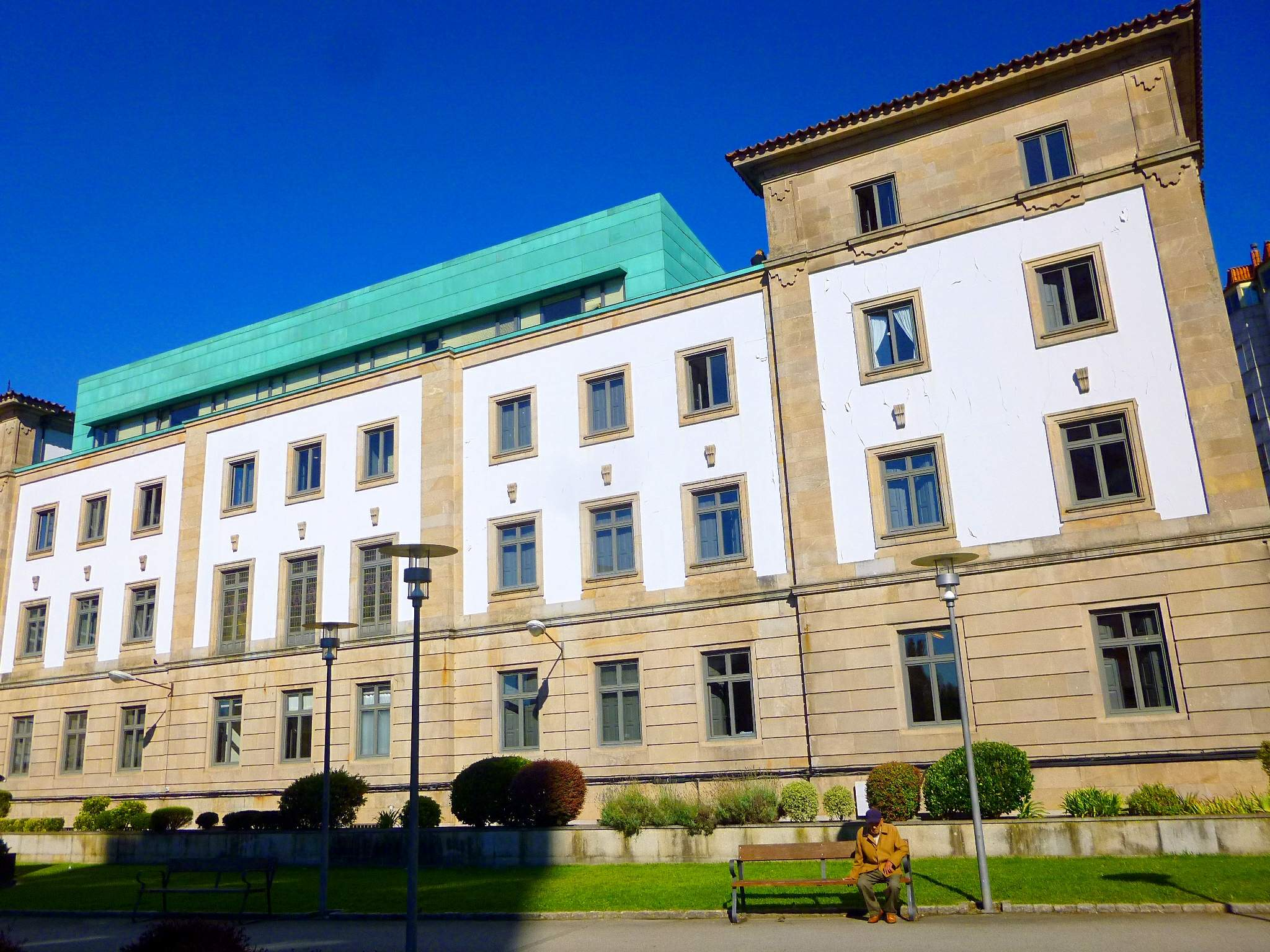
Palace of Justice, rear façade

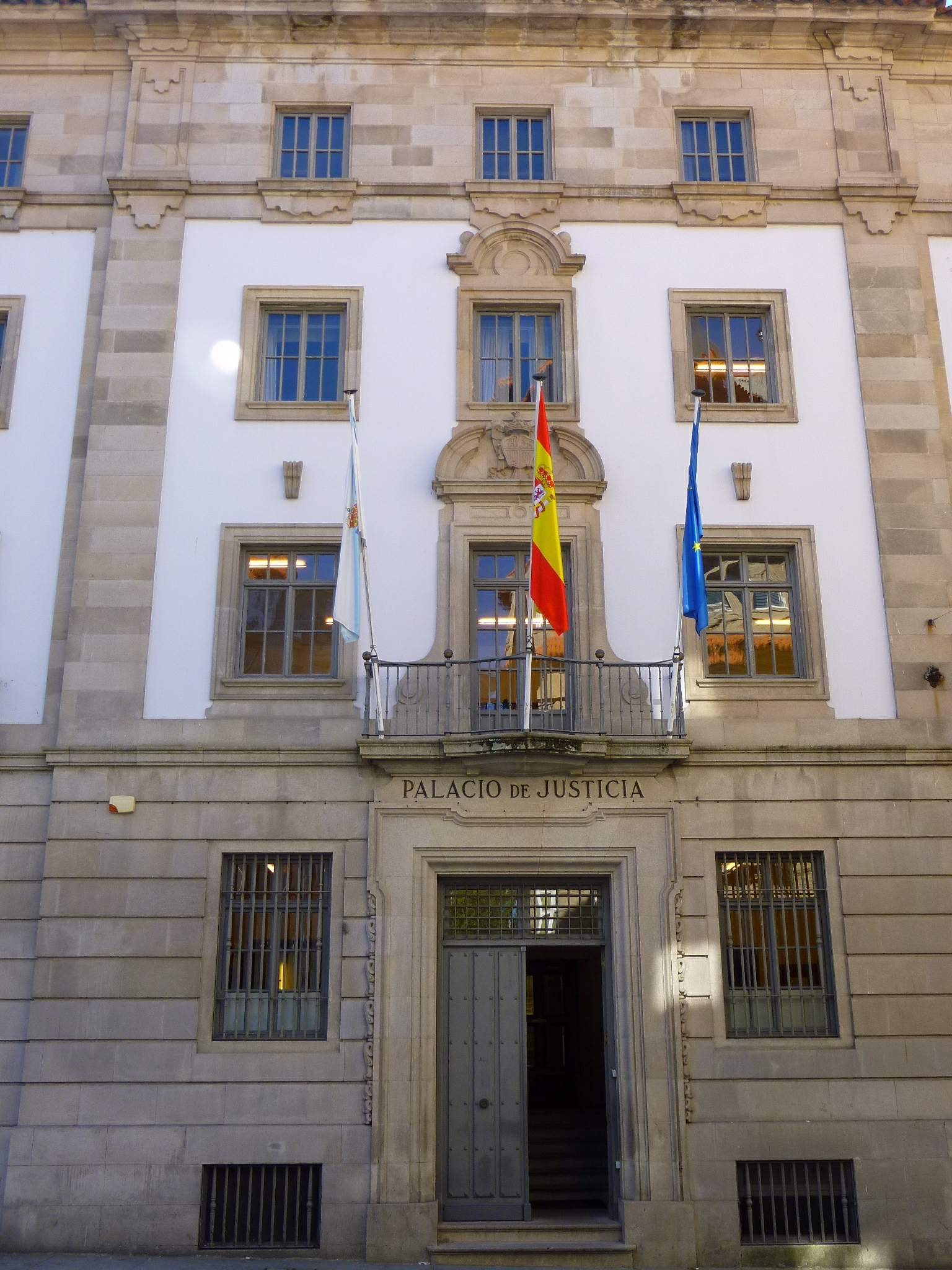
Palace of Justice, detail of the entrance

== See also ==
=== Related articles ===
- Audiencia Provincial (Spain)
- A Parda (Pontevedra)

=== External links ===
- New Pontevedra Courthouse Building
