= Marcos Benavent =

Spanish businessman and former politician

Marcos Benavent (Beniganim, Valencia, 1970) is a Spanish businessman and former politician, known as a "money junkie", who was convicted of corruption in cases involving the Popular Party of Valencia.

== Political and criminal career ==
He was a PP councillor in Xátiva and former director of the public company Imelsa. A self-described "money junkie", his recordings provided to the Civil Guard and later confessions were used in part to open investigations into fraudulent contracts, commissions and an alleged electoral and money laundering offence by the PP in the Taula case.

Born in Beniganim, the son of a lawyer, his parents soon moved to Játiva. He was a Youth Councillor for the Popular Party in Játiva, where he came into contact with its mayor, Alfonso Rus, President of the Valencian Provincial Council and of the Provincial PP. He then became a councillor for fairs and festivals until 2003. Subsequently, he was an advisor to the Jaume II Foundation and to the Regional Ministry of Culture in Valencia, from where he supported Alfonso Rus to reach the provincial council of the PP and the Provincial Council of Valencia. He applied his social skills to lobbying and commissions, and in 2007 he was appointed by Rus as manager of Imelsa.

From Imelsa, he set up a network to manipulate contracts with several Valencian public administrations. He created a front company, Berceo Mantenimientos, which invoiced five other companies, which in turn invoiced Imelsa for work that was never carried out. He was denounced by Esquerra Unida in 2015, and arrested by the UCO during Operation Taula in 2016. His revelations brought down Alfonso Rus and some other politicians and leaders of the Valencian PP, such as David Serra, Máximo Caturla, María José Alcón and Vicente Betoret.

He was sentenced by the Audiencia provincial (Spain) to 7 years and 10 months in prison for fraud, embezzlement and forgery.
