= Rosario Benavent =

Catalan anarchist activist (1902–1921)

- Born: 1902; Barcelona, Catalonia, Spain
- Died: 2 May 1921 (aged 18–19); Barcelona, Catalonia, Spain
- Cause of death: Accidental explosion
- Other name: Roser Benavent
- Occupation: Seamstress
- Organisation: National Confederation of Labour

Rosario Benavent (1902–1921) was a Catalan anarcho-syndicalist activist. A seamstress by trade, she built explosives for anarchist affinity groups during the years of pistolerismo, and was killed when one accidentally detonated.

== Biography ==
Rosario Benavent was born in Barcelona in 1902. She went to work as a seamstress at a young age, joining the garment workers' union of the National Confederation of Labour (CNT). She formed a free union with Vicent Sales, a textile worker, with whom she participated in anarchist activism and established a lampshade-making workshop.

She held meetings of anarcho-syndicalist affinity groups at her home, in the neighbourhood of Sants. During the years of Pistolerismo, she built improvised explosive devices for these groups to fight back against attacks by the pistoleros; one of these groups, led by Alfons Vila, attempted to assassinate Barcelona governor Severiano Martínez Anido by planting a bomb at a Sometent parade on Passeig de Gràcia. Many of Benavent's fellow union members, with whom she helped to organize prisoner support for detainees at the prison on Carrer d'Entença, were unaware of her militant activities during this time.

On 2 May 1921, an explosive Benavent was preparing accidentally detonated, killing her and severely wounding Vila, leaving him disabled. Her co-conspirators were all arrested, imprisoned and sentenced to death, although the sentenced would not be carried out, and they were eventually released following the proclamation of the Second Spanish Republic. Benavent's role in the clandestine fight against the pistoleros was praised in later anarchist writings of the period.

== Bibliography ==
- Íñiguez, Miguel (2001). "Benavent, Rosario". Esbozo de una enciclopedia histórica del anarquismo español (in Spanish). Madrid: Fundación de Estudios Libertarios Anselmo Lorenzo. p. 85. ISBN 9788486864453. OCLC 807322760.
- Marin Silvestre, Dolors (29 September 2010). "Rosario Benavent". Diccionari Biogràfic de Dones (in Catalan). Xarxa Vives d'Universitats.
