= Judit Benavente =

Spanish model and influencer (born 1989)

- Born: Judit Benavente; 21 August 1989 (age 37)
- Occupation: Model
- Years active: 2012- present
- Notable work: Playboy, Interview

Judit Benavente Villarrazo (born 21 August 1989, in Vic, Barcelona) is a Spanish model, public figure, and influencer, known for her work in fashion, advertising campaigns, photo shoots and her presence on social networks.

== Biography ==
Judit Benavente grew up in a small town in Barcelona, where, from an early age, she showed interest in the world of fashion and entertainment. During her teenage years, she participated in several beauty pageants, winning multiple titles and attracting the attention of modeling agencies.

She completed her secondary education and, in parallel, attended modeling courses, where she honed her skills in front of the camera. Her training included classes in body expression and photography techniques, which helped her build a solid career in modeling. She also studied administration and TCP (Passenger Cabin Crew).

Judit Benavente's professional career began to take off when, in 2012, she reached a significant milestone in her career, winning first place in the Miss Facebook and Miss Facebook World pageants, a beauty contest that gave her visibility and opened doors for her in the world of modeling. This recognition established her as a prominent figure in the industry and allowed her to expand her network of professional contacts.

In addition to her advertising campaigns, Judit has been on the cover of magazines such as Interviú (Spain), Primera Línea (Spain), FHM (Spain), PlayBoy and has made other appearances for international fashion publications.

In addition to modeling, Judit has appeared in several television projects in Spain.

In 2016, she reached 2 million followers on Instagram.

== Private life ==
Judit Benavente keeps her personal life relatively private, occasionally sharing moments with her family and friends on her social networks. She is known for her commitment to fitness and wellness, topics that she also often talks about in her posts.
