= Audiencia provincial (Spain) =

Type of judicial court in Spain

The audiencias provinciales (Sing. audiencia provincial; lit. 'Provincial Court') are courts located in each of the provinces of Spain, typically in the provincial capital. They handle both civil and criminal cases and are structured in sections consisting of three or four magistrates, who may sit jointly or individually depending on the nature of the case. They function mainly as courts of second instance (that is, courts handling a first level of appeal) for all courts of first instance and organs of civil arbitration within the province.

In some cases, sections of the Audiencia Provincial are elsewhere than the capital. Examples include seventh and ninth sections of the Audiencia Provincial of Alicante, located in Elche rather than Alicante; the fifth section of the Audiencia Provincial of Murcia in Cartagena; the third section of the Audiencia Provincial de Badajoz located in Mérida; the seventh and the eighth sections of the Audiencia Provincial de Asturias located in Gijón; the seventh section of the Audiencia Provincial de Málaga located in Melilla; the Audiencia Provincial of La Coruña, with its sixth section in Santiago de Compostela; the Audiencia Provincial of Pontevedra, with its fifth and sixth sections in Vigo; and the Audiencia Provincial of Cádiz with the sixth section in the exclave of Ceuta, the seventh section in Algeciras and the eight section in Jerez de la Frontera.

== See also ==
=== Related articles ===
- Pontevedra Judicial Complex
