= Order of Constitutional Merit =

Spanish civil order of merit

Order of Constitutional Merit Orden del Mérito Constitucional
- Insignia of the Order of Constitutional Merit.

Awarded by Council of Ministers
- Type: Order of Merit
- Established: 1988; 37 years ago
- Awarded for: Recognition of activities in the fields of law and jurisprudence.
- Chancellor: Minister of Justice

Precedence
- Next (higher): Orden de San Raimundo de Peñafort
- Next (lower): Orden Civil de la Solidaridad Social
- Ribbon of the Order

The Order of Constitutional Merit is a civil order of merit established by royal decree on 18 November 1988. The order is granted those who have carried out activities in service of the Spanish Constitution and its values and established principles. It may be granted to people and groups both public or private, Spanish or foreign. Recipients are treated as an Excellency.

== Appearance ==
The order has a distinctive oval medal, made of sterling silver with gold plating. The obverse is the coat of arms of Spain on a blue background and the legend Constitutional Merit. The badge of the Order of Constitutional Merit hangs from a silk ribbon equally divided in red and yellow parts. The Medal of Constitutional Merit hangs from a twisted silk cord of red and yellow. Groups and organizations are awarded a Plaque of Honor with the insignia of the order.

== Notable recipients ==
- Gloria Begué Cantón
- Josep Borrell Fontelles
- Tomás Caballero Pastor
- Gabriel Cisneros
- Eduardo Chillida
- Rosa Díez
- Carlos Martínez Gorriarán
- Agustín Ibarrola
- Jon Juaristi
- Jaime Mayor Oreja
- José María Portillo Valdés
- Gotzone Mora
- Javier Pradera
- José Rivas Fontán
- Pascual Sala
- Fernando Savater
- Pablo Pérez Tremps
