= Edurne Uriarte =

Spanish politician and political scientist (born 1960)

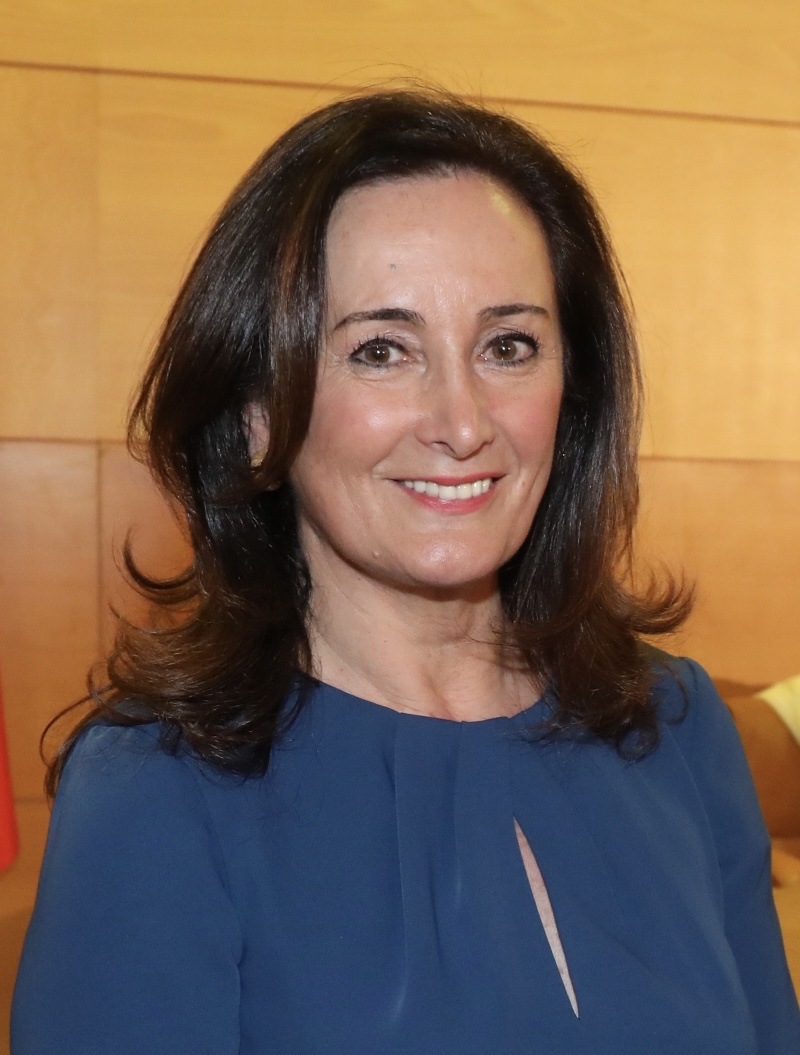

Member of the Congress of Deputies
- Incumbent
- Assumed office 2019
- Constituency: Constituency of Madrid

Personal details
- Occupation: Politician; Political scientist

Edurne Uriarte Bengoechea is a Spanish politician, political scientist, and sociologist. She is a member of the Congress of Deputies for the People's Party of Spain, representing The Constituency of Madrid.

== Life and career ==
Uriarte was born in Fruiz, a small town in Biscay. She attended the Frúniz public school, at the Compasión de Munguía school, and at the Munguía Public Institute, where she focused on the study of music theory and especially the piano. When she was young she became engaged in the anti-Francoist movement.

In 1977, Uriarte became a journalism student at the University of the Basque Country. Four years later, she attended the Complutense University of Madrid, where she studied Sociology and Political Science. In 1987 she began teaching at the University of the Basque Country, and in 1992 she graduated from the Complutense University with a doctorate in Sociology and Political Science. Her thesis was a study of Basque intellectuals. In 1995, she became a tenured professor at the University of the Basque Country.

In the 1990s, Uriarte was a member of the executive of the Partido Socialista de Euskadi (es). In 1998, Uriarte was a co-founder of the civic association Foro Ermua, and she became involved in the grassroots activist organisation ¡Basta Ya!

Uriarte won the 2001 Chair of Political Science at the University of the Basque Country (es). In 2002 she became the president of the Fundación para la Libertad, and distanced herself from her previous affiliation with the PSE. This shift was partly prompted by her experiences opposing Basque separatist terrorism, which included dangerous encounters with the Euskadi Ta Askatasuna.

Uriarte was listed in the third position on the party list of the People's Party of Spain in the April 2019 Spanish general election for the constituency of Madrid, and she won the seat, which she continued to hold through the November 2019 Spanish general election.

Uriarte has published a number of books, including Cobardes y rebeldes (Cowards and rebels, 2003), and Feminista y de Derechos (Feminist and right, 2019). She was a 2004 winner of the Spanish Order of Constitutional Merit.
