= Gloria Begué Cantón =

Spanish magistrate and academic (1931–2016)

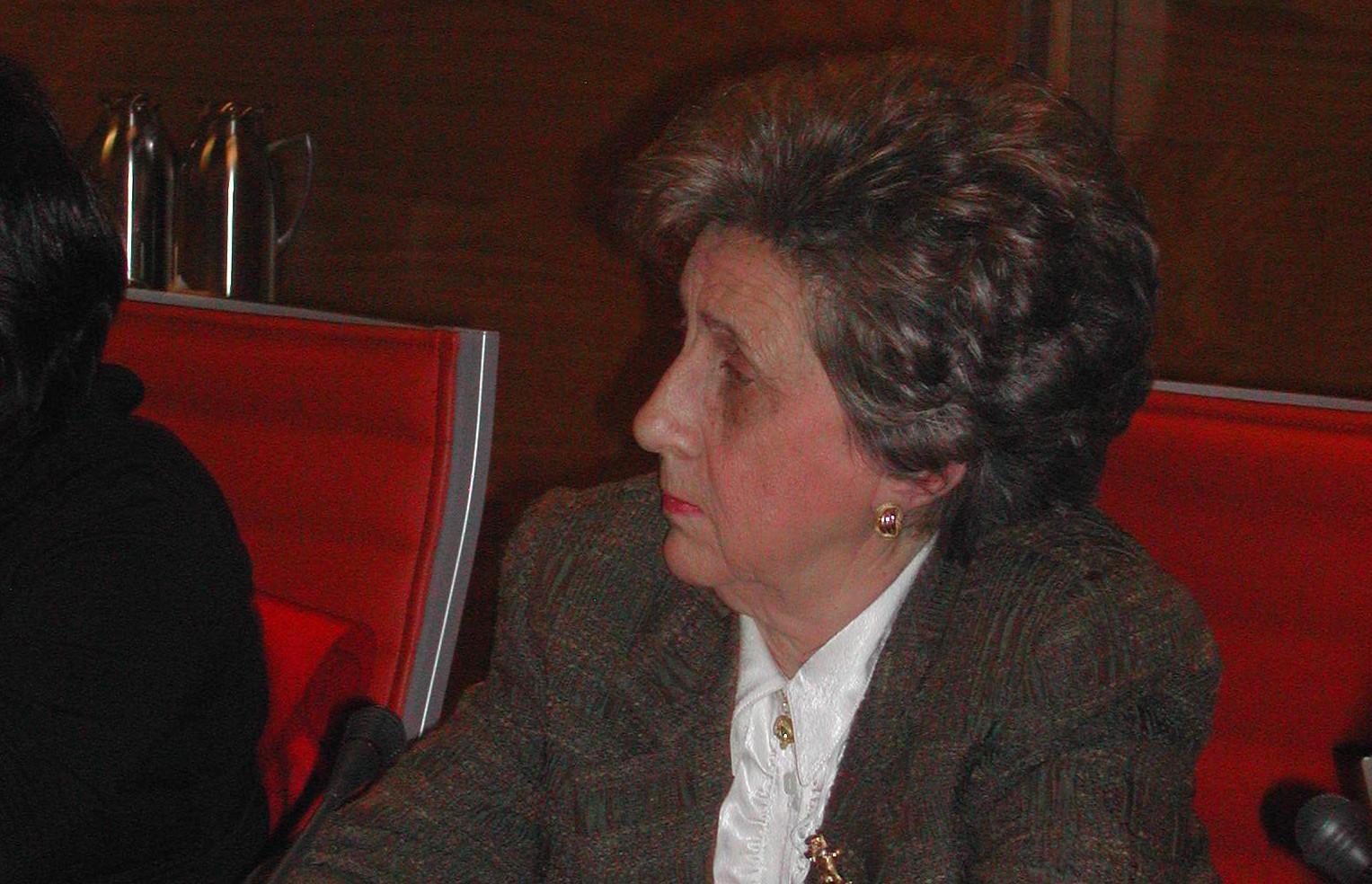
- Begué in 2006

Vice-President of the Constitutional Court of Spain
- In office 4 March 1986 – 21 February 1989
- Preceded by: Jerónimo Arozamena
- Succeeded by: Francisco Rubio Llorente

Magistrate of the Constitutional Court of Spain
- In office 14 February 1980 – 21 February 1989

Senator of the Senate of Spain
- In office 15 June 1977 – 2 January 1979

Personal details
- Born: 23 March 1931 La Bañeza, Province of León, Spain
- Died: 27 December 2016 (aged 85) Madrid, Spain
- Education: Complutense University of Madrid; University of Chicago
- Occupation: Jurist; Magistrate; Professor; Senator
- Awards: Dame Grand Cross of the Order of Isabella the Catholic; Grand Cross of the Order of Civil Merit; Order of Constitutional Merit

Gloria Begué Cantón (23 March 1931 – 27 December 2016) was a Spanish professor, jurist, senator and magistrate. She was the first female law school professor in Spain and was a law educator at Complutense University of Madrid and the University of Salamanca.

Cantón became the first female dean at a Spanish university in 1969 and resigned three years later. In 1977, she was appointed a senator in the Senate of Spain as a member of the parliamentary group Agrupación Independiente and therefore joined the Constitutional Court of Spain. She was also the first woman magistrate appointed to the Constitutional Court of Spain in 1980 and became its first female vice-president in 1986. She returned to academia at the University of Salamanca following the end of her nine-year term on the court in 1989 before retiring in 2001.

== Early life and education ==
On 23 March 1931, Cantón was born in La Bañeza, Province of León, Spain. Her father, Juan María Begué Arjona, was a property registrar who was murdered in the first months of the Spanish Civil War in October 1936. Cantón grew up in La Bañeza and gained her Spanish Baccalaureate at the Instituto Padre Isla de León. She graduated from the Complutense University of Madrid with a Doctorate in Law and bachelor's degrees in both Law and Economic Sciences at the Department of Economics of the University of Chicago, where she studied on a scholarship from the Fulbright Program between 1958 and 1961. This was at a time when few women attended the university.

== Career ==
She passed her competitive examination in 1964 and became the first female law school professor and the fourth to become a professor in Spain. Cantón was appointed adjunct professor of Political Economy at the Faculty of Law of the Complutense University of Madrid and adjunct professor of Economic Theory at the Faculty of Political and Economic Sciences in which she was in charge of Macroeconomics. She extensively employed macroeconomic models, which was a novelty at the time. Cantón was made chair Chair of Political Economy and Public Finance at the Faculty of Law of the University of Salamanca in 1964, launching a practically non-existent department and commencing a process to modernise the contents and approach of the economic disciplines in the legal faculties. She refused to teach an exclusive group of female students and was surprised at her request to reside at the Colegio Mayor de Santiago el Zebedeo.

Cantón became the first female dean at a university in Spain in 1969 when the Faculty Board elected her to the position. She resigned her position in 1972 due to discrepancies with the university policy of the Ministry, which had dismissed their rector mid-summer, causing her to believe there was political interference with university autonomy. The criticism resulted in her opening a disciplinary file that was due to her signature on an open letter questioning university policy in November 1973; the complaint was subsequently closed following an attack on Luis Carrero Blanco, the Prime Minister of Spain.

On 15 June 1977, Cantón was appointed a senator in the Senate of Spain by Juan Carlos I as a member of the parliamentary group Agrupación Independiente and therefore joined the Constitutional Court of Spain. She was a member of the Economy and Treasury Commission and the Budgets Committee. Cantón was first vice-president of the Special Commission on Scientific Policy and was deputy spokesperson of Agrupación Independiente. She was part of the court which drafted the Constitution of Spain in 1978. Cantón defended amendments and private votes related to the article 27 —the right to education—, article 40 —guiding principles of economic policy an amendment that served as the basis for its definitive drafting—, the preliminary article 44 —ensuring quality control and product information— and article 51 — the recognition of the rights of consumers and users. She left the Senate on 2 January 1979. Upon the end of the legislature, Cantón became vice-president of the State Administration-General Council of Castilla y León commission that was set up to lead the management of power transfer and was director of the Institute of Economy of Castilla y León between 1978 and 1980.

Following a proposal by the Senate, she was appointed magistrate of the First Constitutional Court of Spain on 14 February 1980. Cantón was the first female magistrate on the Constitutional Court of Spain. She was later elected vice-president of the Constitutional Court of Spain during its plenary session in which she received eight votes and four blank ballots on 4 March 1986. Cantón was rapporteur in more than 100 judgements such as the right to work; presumption of innocence; conscientious objection; the draft Organic Law on the Harmonization of the Autonomous Process; the partial decriminalization of abortion; the Coat of arms of Navarre; the application of tax regulations; bank savings; university autonomy; and the expropriation of Rumasa. She rejected all forms of interference and provided proof of her absolute independence of judgement in cases. Cantón was considered to be a more ideologically conservative member of the court, and ceased to be a magistrate when her nine-year term ended in February 1989.

Cantón returned to the University of Salamanca and worked as a professor and director of the Department of Applied Economics to her retirement in 2001. She taught courses on the European Union in the Jean Monnet Chair, the legal-constitutional aspects of economic relations in doctoral and postgraduate programs. Cantón participated in symposiums organised by the Encuentro Foundation and in seminars of the Fe y Secularidad Institute. She was chair of the Management Board of the Institute of International Issues and the Independent Association Foundation of the Senate; was a member of the European Institute of Spain; the Committee of Experts of Expo '92; Council for the Debate on the Future of the European Union and was on the jury of the Prince of Asturias Awards in the Social Sciences in 1998. Cantón was on the committee of the Marshall Memorial Fellowship and of the Fulbright-Banco de Bilbao scholarships. She was president of the jury of the 1998 Infanta Cristina Award for Economics and of the Research Awards of the Public University of Navarra in Human and Social Sciences between 2001 and 2003. Cantón was a patron of the Duques de Soria Foundation.

She died on 27 December 2016 in Madrid. Few media outlets published obituaries of Cantón in the days following her death despite the achievements of her legal career.

== Awards ==
On 27 February 1989, Cantón was decorated with the Dame Grand Cross of the Order of Isabella the Catholic by Juan Carlos I. She received the Grand Cross of the Order of Civil Merit from the King in Madrid on 8 September 2000. Cantón was awarded the Gold Medal by the University of Salamanca, their highest accolade, for her career in academia in 2004. She also got the Order of Constitutional Merit.
