= Pelota vasca =

Pelota vasca may refer to:

- Basque pelota — court ballgame similar to jai alai
- La pelota vasca — 2003 political documentary about the Basque County, by Julio Medem
