= Jordi Solé =

Jordi Solé may refer to:

- Jordi Solé Tura (1930–2009), Spanish politician and jurist
- Jordi Solé i Ferrando (born 1976), Spanish politician
