= Fathers of the Constitution =

The Fathers of the Constitution (Spanish: Padres de la Constitución) were the seven political leaders who participated in the writing of the Spanish Constitution of 1978.

Gabriel Cisneros, Miguel Herrero y Rodríguez de Miñón and José Pedro Pérez Llorca represented the centre-right Union of the Democratic Centre; Manuel Fraga Iribarne, the right-wing People's Alliance; Gregorio Peces-Barba, the left-wing Spanish Socialist Worker's Party; Jordi Solé Tura, the Unified Socialist Party of Catalonia / Communist Party of Spain and Miguel Roca Junyent, of the Democratic Pact for Catalonia, represented the Catalan nationalists.

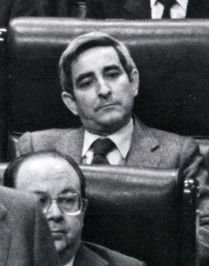
Gabriel Cisneros (1940–2007)

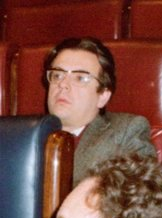
Miguel Herrero y Rodríguez de Miñón (born 1940)

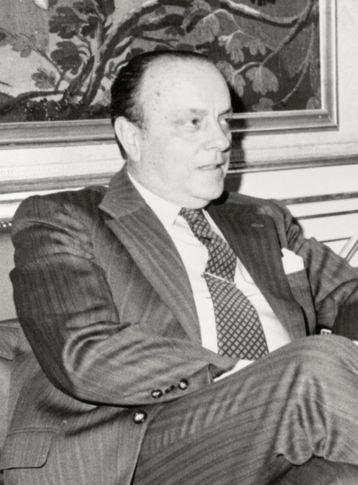
Manuel Fraga Iribarne (1922–2012)

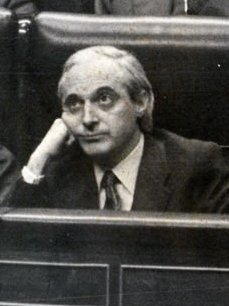
José Pedro Pérez-Llorca (1940–2019)

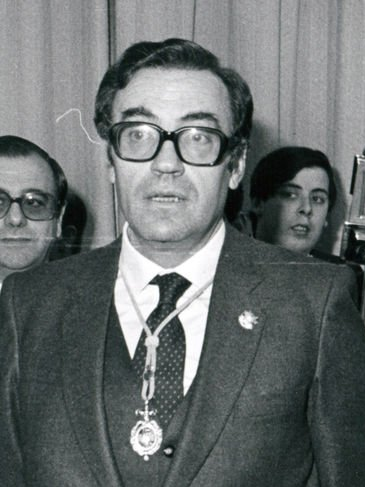
Gregorio Peces-Barba (1938–2012)

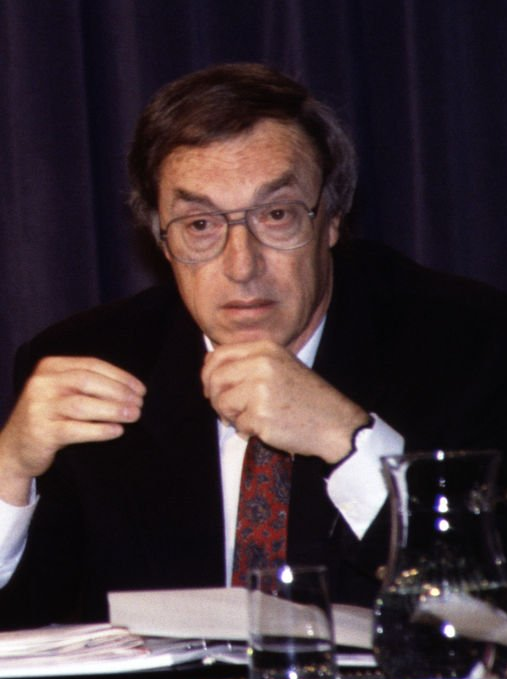
Jordi Solé Tura (1930–2009)

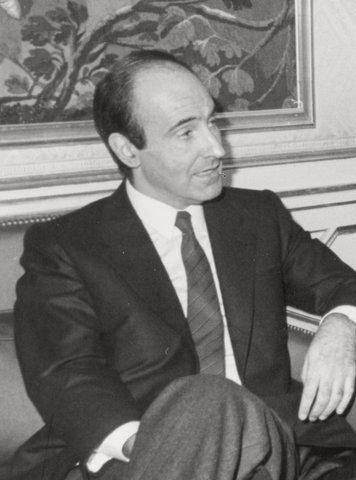
Miquel Roca Junyent (born 1940)

== See also ==
- Spanish transition to democracy
- Spanish Constitution of 1978
