= José María Portillo Valdés =

Spanish historian

José M. Portillo Valdés
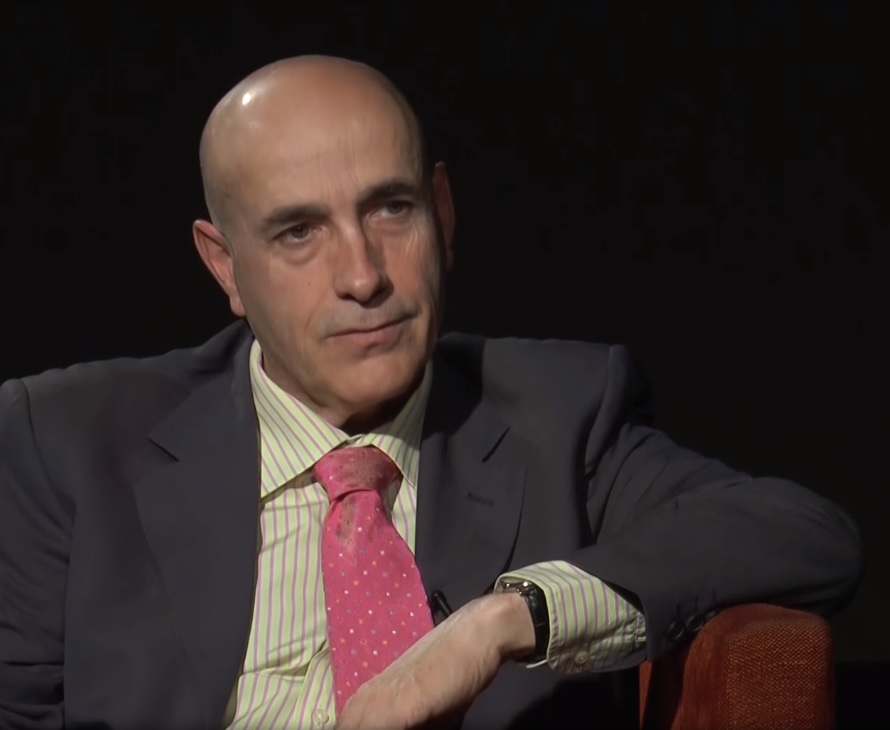
- Born: 1 December 1961
- Alma mater: Autonomous University of Madrid; Autonomous University of Madrid; University of the Basque Country
- Employer: Instituto de Investigaciones Dr. José María Luis Mora (2010–2011); El Colegio de México (2011–2011); Georgetown University (2001–2002); Universidad Externado de Colombia (2012–2012); University of Nevada, Reno (2002–2004); University of the Basque Country (1988–)
- Awards: medal of the Order of Constitutional Merit (2003)

José María "Txema" Portillo Valdés (born on 1961 in Bilbao) is a Spanish historian, professor of Contemporary History at the University of the Basque Country. He is an expert in Spanish constitutional history.

== Biography ==
Valdés was born in 1961. He earned a PhD in History from the University of the Basque Country (UPV/EHU), reading a dissertation in 1990 titled Monarquía y Gobierno Provincial. Poder y Constitución en las provincias exentas, 1760-1808 and supervised by Pablo Fernández Albaladejo. On 13 February 1998, he was one of the founders of the Foro Ermua. A lecturer at the UPV/EHU since 1988, he was subject to harassment and threats coming from ETA, as well as an attempted attack at the Vitoria Campus where he worked, wherein an incendiary artifact was put in his car in October 1999. He was appointed Chair in Contemporary History at the UPV/EHU in 2017.

== Works ==
Author

- — (1987). Los poderes locales en la formación del régimen foral. Guipúzcoa, 1812-1850. Bilbao: Servicio Editorial de la Universidad del País Vasco.
- — (1991). Monarquía y Gobierno provincial. Poder y constitución en las provincias vascas (1760-1808). Madrid: Centro de Estudios Constitucionales.
- — (2000). La Nazione cattolica. Cadice 1812: Una costituzione per la Spagna. Manduria–Bari–Roma: Piero Lacaita Editore.
- — (2000). Revolución de nación. Orígenes de la cultura constitucional en España, 1780-1812. Madrid: Centro de Estudios Políticos y Constitucionales.
- — (2006). Portillo Valdés, José María. Crisis atlántica. Autonomía e independencia en la crisis de la monarquía hispana. Madrid: Fundación Carolina; Centro de Estudios Hispánicos e Iberoamericanos; Marcial Pons Historia.
- — (2015). Fuero indio. Tlaxcala y la identidad territorial entre la monarquía y la república nacional, 1787-1824. Mexico: El Colegio de México; Instituto de Investigaciones Dr. José María Luis Mora; CONACyT.
- — (2018). Entre tiros e historia. La constitución de la autonomía vasca (1976–1979). Barcelona: Galaxia Gutenberg.

Co-author

- Clavero, Bartolomé; Lorente, Marta; Portillo, José María (2004). Pueblos, Nación Constitución (en torno a 1812). Vitoria: Ikusager.

== Decorations ==
- Medal of the Order of the Constitutional Merit (2003)
