= Pablo Pérez Tremps =

Spanish judge and academic (1956–2021)

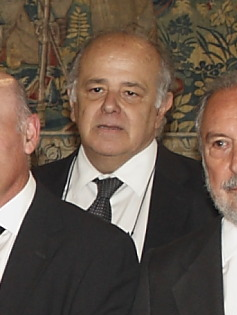
- Tremps in June 2013

Magistrate of the Constitutional Court of Spain
- In office June 2004 – June 2013

Personal details
- Born: 22 August 1956 Madrid, Spain
- Died: 16 July 2021 (aged 64)
- Education: Complutense University of Madrid
- Occupation: Judge; Professor

Pablo Pérez Tremps (22 August 1956 – 16 July 2021) was a Spanish judge on the Constitutional Court and professor of constitutional law.

== Early life ==
Pérez Tremps was born on 22 August 1956 in Madrid, Spain.

Pérez Tremps graduated from the Complutense University of Madrid with a law degree in 1978.

== Career ==
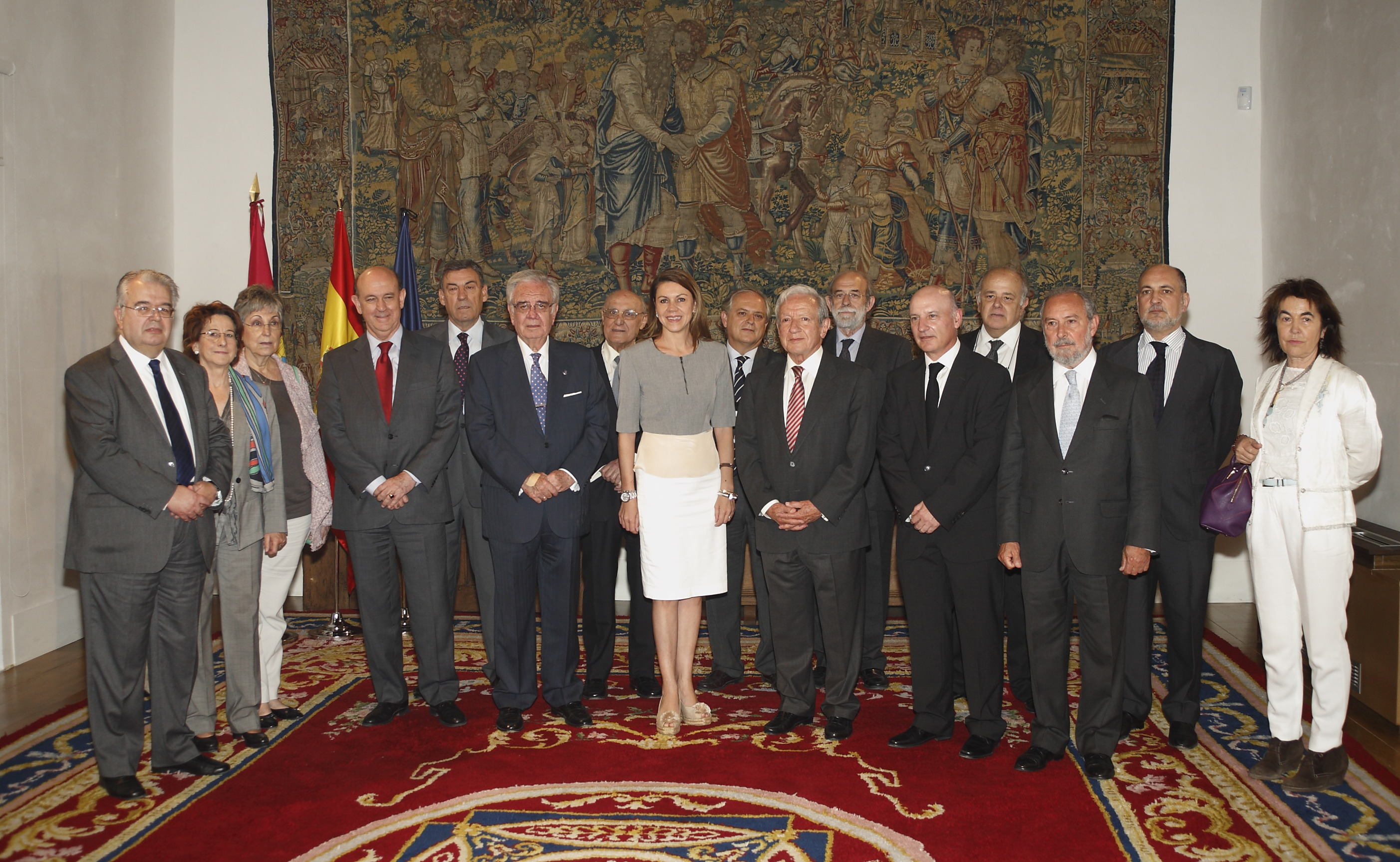
Pérez Tremps (fourth from right) and the other magistrates of the Constitutional Court of Spain in June 2013

Pérez Tremps joined the Constitutional Court of Spain in June 2004, for a nine-year term. Pérez Tremps left the court in June 2013.

Pérez Tremps was awarded the Medal of the Order of Constitutional Merit on 5 December 2014, in Madrid.

Pérez Tremps died on 16 July 2021, at the age of 64.

== Publications ==
- Normas Políticas (in Spanish). Madrid, Spain: Editorial Tecnos. 2020. ISBN 978-84-309-8004-8.
- Tribunal Constitucional y Poder Judicial (in Spanish). Madrid, Spain: Centre for Constitutional Studies. 1985. ISBN 978-84-259-0721-0.
