= The Basque Ball: Skin Against Stone =

- Theatrical Poster
- Directed by: Julio Médem
- Written by: Julio Médem
- Produced by: Julio Médem; Koldo Zuazua
- Cinematography: Javier Aguirre; Ricardo de Gracia; Daniel Sosa Segura
- Edited by: Julio Medem
- Distributed by: Golem Distribución
- Release date: September 10, 2003
- Running time: 110 minutes
- Country: Spain
- Languages: Basque; English; French; Spanish

The Basque Ball: Skin Against Stone (Spanish: La pelota vasca: la piel contra la piedra; Basque: Euskal pilota: larrua harriaren kontra) is a 2003 Spanish documentary film written and directed by Julio Medem.

== Overview ==
The film's purported intention is to create a bridge between the different political positions that coexist, sometimes violently, in the Basque Country. In order to do so, Medem edits the interviews giving a sense of dialogue between parties that refused to sit down and talk. Due to its lack of contextualization, the film may be hard to understand to audiences without previous knowledge of the Basque problem—it is obviously a film designed to be viewed by Spanish audiences, or people familiar with the issues.

The movie also utilizes footage from the Basque portions of the 1955 travelogue Around The World With Orson Welles, and continually intercuts between interviews and jai alai players.

== Criticism ==
One of the main controversies of the documentary is that the two principal protagonists in the controversy, the then incumbent Partido Popular and ETA refused to take part in the interviews. The former went so far as to request the organisers of the Donostia-San Sebastian International Film Festival to reconsider the film's suitability. This, in turn, has led some to call it an incomplete documentary.

It has also been openly criticized by both extremes, and Medem, who is Basque, has been accused of being both pro-ETA and pro-"Spanish occupation". Indeed, two of the interviewees, Iñaki Ezquerra and Gotzone Mora (both members of the intellectual group the Ermua Forum) demanded that Medem retract their interviews, accusing him of presenting the Spanish Guardia Civil and police forces as torturers and ETA and their followers as victims. Despite these protests, their interviews remained due to the film's imminent release date. They did not, however, appear on the 7-hour DVD Edition.

There is a three-disc special edition DVD (ISBN 0-499-01513-4) released with seven hours of edited footage that goes deeper into the history of the Basque Country and a Spanish-language book (ISBN 84-03-09425-6).

== Awards and nominations ==
- 2004: Nominated, Goya Awards, Best Documentary
- 2004: Nominated, European Film Awards, Best Documentary
- 2004: Nominated, Cartagena Film Festival, Best Film

== See also ==
- List of Spanish films of 2003
