= Jon Juaristi =

Basque writer (born 1951)

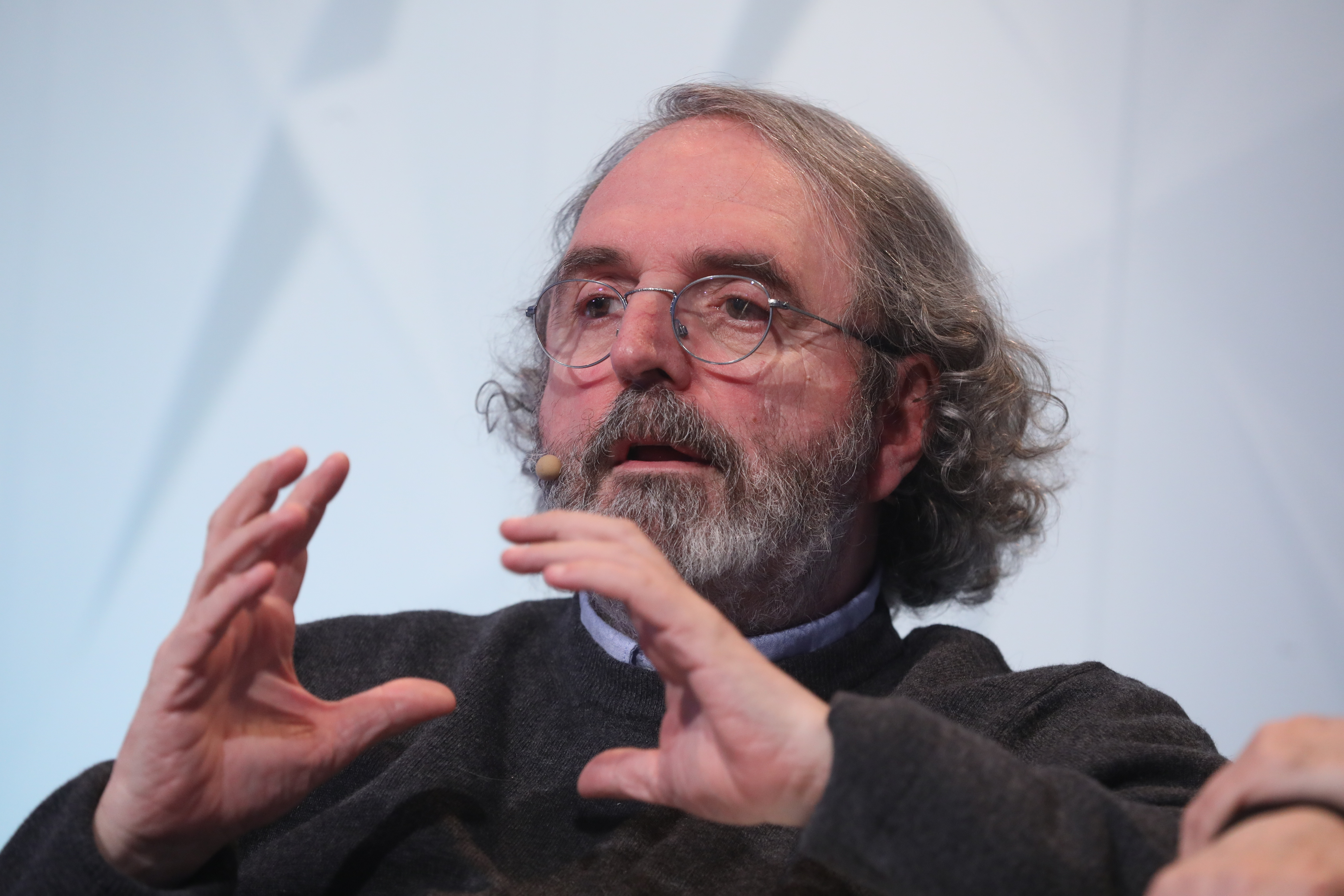
- Jon Juaristi in 2019
- Born: 1951 (age 74–75); Bilbao, Spain
- Education: University of Deusto
- Occupations: Poet, essayist and translator
- Writing career
- Language: Spanish and Basque
- Notable awards: Ícaro de Literatura

Jon Juaristi Linacero (born in Bilbao in 1951) is a Spanish poet, essayist and translator in Spanish and Basque, as well as a self-confessed former ETA militant. He lives in Madrid.

== Biography ==
=== Education and employment ===
A Ph.D. in Romance philology, he studied at the University of Deusto and in Seville.

He has occupied the chair of Spanish Philology at the University of the Basque Country, the King Juan Carlos I of Spain Center at New York University, and has been titular professor of the Chair of Contemporary Thought of the Cañada Blanch Foundation at the University of Valencia. Juaristi also worked as a lecturer and researcher in Austin and at El Colegio de México. He directed the National Library of Spain from 1999 to 2001, and then left that position to direct the Cervantes Institute until his replacement after the Socialist triumph of March 14, 2004.

=== Early political activism ===
At the age of 16, spurred by the reading of Federico Krutwig´s Vasconia, he entered in a fledgling ETA. His most notable action was to put Carlist armed cells in contact with ETA after the expulsion by the Franco regime of Carlos Hugo de Borbón Parma (a pretender to the Spanish throne)

Later, at University, he entered a minority workerist grouping of ETA, named ETA VI Asamblea, which in 1973 amalgamated with the Trotskyist Liga Comunista Revolucionaria (LCR) as its Basque branch. Having come to police attention, he abandoned his native city to study Romance Philology in Seville, returning eventually to the University of Deusto, where he received his doctorate. In Deusto he was expelled in 1972 "for agitation" but was re-admitted the following year. In this period he spent a number of spells in prison for "minor offences", and was condemned by the Tribunal of Public Order.

In 1974 he left LCR and leftist political activity almost completely and dedicated himself to his academic career.

In 1980, he affiliated himself with the Communist Party of Spain during its process of unification with Euskadiko Ezkerra (EE), which would give rise to a new social-democratic group that actively rejected the use of violence. He left it in 1986, disappointed when EE did not form an alliance with the Spanish Socialist Workers' Party (PSOE) after the Basque Autonomous Community elections of 1986. In 1987 Juaristi joined the PSOE. Later, he declared in his memoirs that he did so spurred by "ethical imperatives" as a result of the attack by the radical separatist "Mendeku" group against the "Casa del Pueblo" (PSOE local chapter) in Portugalete. Several PSOE members were burned to death in the attack.

=== Current political activity ===
His criticism of ethnic nationalism and its invention and manipulation of myths, in particular on the part of Basque nationalism, has gained media visibility through numerous articles, essays, and speeches. Juaristi's stance against terrorism, and his support of victims of ETA violence, was further made visible by the formation of the Foro Ermua (Forum of Ermua, now a conservative anti-terrorism organization but with roots in the Basque left) in 1997. In the last decade he has been defined, in various mass media interviews, as a "Spanish nationalist"." Since the end of the 1980s, due to his harsh criticism of Basque separatist violence, his life has been threatened by ETA. At the end of 1999, he left the university of Deusto and the Basque country after the ETA announcement that it would end its ceasefire of the previous year, and having been advised of the seriousness of the threats on his life by that group.

Juaristi converted to Judaism for reasons more personal than religious:

El judaísmo para mí no es exactamente una religión, sino más bien una visión ética del mundo ("Judaism is for me not exactly a religion, but rather an ethical view of the world")

Advertí que yo me consideraba un judío no religioso, si tal cosa es posible. ("I warned that I considered myself a non-religious Jew, if such a thing is possible.")

Juaristi dedicates a number of his articles to the criticism of antisemitism (and anti-Zionism, which he considers to be inherently antisemitic). He has also written in defense of Israel's right to be its own state.

== Poetry ==
Juaristi's poetic voice is influenced by the Basque poet (and his close friend) Gabriel Aresti, and by the Basque-born, Spanish-writing writers Miguel de Unamuno and Blas de Otero—as well as by the irony of the poet and Anglo-American essayist W. H. Auden. His poetry frequently evokes the mood of the Bilbao of his childhood and youth, and its tone is disillusioned, bitter, urban and intelligent.

His works of poetry have been published as the following:

- Diario de un poeta recién cansado ("Diary of a poet recently tired") (1986).
- Suma de varia intención ("Amount of varying intention") (1987).
- Arte de marear ("Art to annoy") (1988).
- Los paisajes domésticos ("The domestic landscapes") (1992).
- Mediodía ("Noon") (1993).
- Tiempo desapacible ("Unpleasant time") (1996).
- Poesía reunida ("Reunited poetry") (1986-1999) (2001).
- Prosas en verso ("Prose in verse") (2002).

== Essays ==
In Juaristi's essays analysis is a habitual subject, from a psychological and sociological perspective inspired by Carl Jung and Leon Polyakov, and the historical and mythical roots of European nationalism, particularly Basque nationalism. Philological references are found frequently in the texts, as well as references and anecdotes which deal with authors, subjects and works of occultism. These are usually mentioned with distance and irony.

- Euskararen Ideologiak (1976).
- El linaje de Aitor. La invención de la tradición vasca (1984).
- Literatura vasca (1987).
- Arte en el País Vasco (1987). Con Kosme M. de Barañano y Javier González de Durana.
- Vicente de Arana (1990).
- Vestigios de Babel. Para una arqueología de los nacionalismos españoles (1992).
- Auto de Terminación: raza, nación y violencia en el País Vasco (1994). Artículos: en colaboración con Juan Aranzadi y Patxo Unzueta.
- La Europa (cultural) de los pueblos: voz y forma (1994). En colaboración con otros autores.
- El chimbo expiatorio (la invención de la tradición bilbaína, 1876-1939) (1994).
- El bucle melancólico. Historias de nacionalistas vascos (1997).
- Sacra nemesis. Nuevas historias de nacionalistas vascos (1999).
- Sermo humilis: poesía y poética (1999).
- El bosque originario (2000).
- La tribu atribulada. El Nacionalismo Vasco explicado a mi padre (2002).
- El reino del ocaso (2004).

== Autobiography ==
- Cambio de destino (2006) ISBN 978-84-322-9668-0

== Prizes ==
- 1988: Ícaro de Literatura.
- 1997: Espasa de Ensayo por El bucle melancólico.
- 1998: XV Premio de Periodismo Francisco Cerecedo.
- 1998: Premio Nacional de Literatura por El bucle melancólico.
- 2000: Fastenrath.
