= Miguel Herrero y Rodríguez de Miñón =

Spanish politician

The Most Excellent Miguel Herrero de Miñón
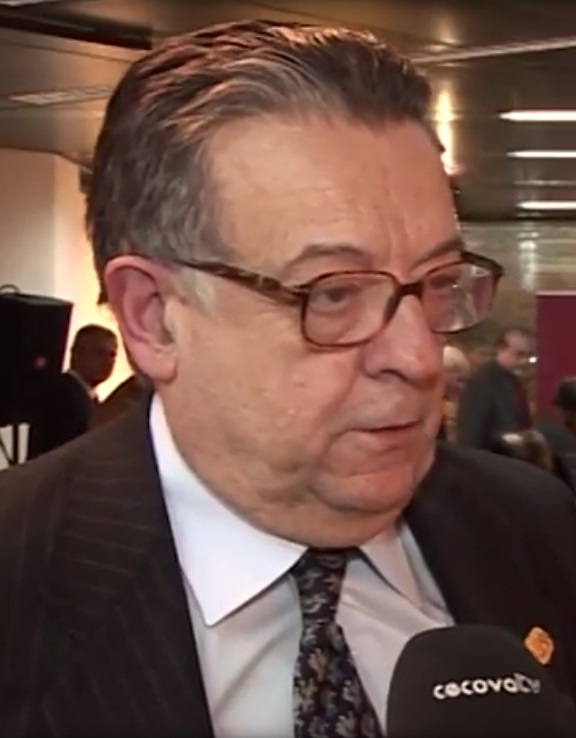
- In 2015

Member of the Congress of Deputies
- In office 15 June 1977 – 6 June 1993
- Constituency: Madrid

Personal details
- Born: Miguel Herrero y Rodríguez de Miñón; 18 June 1940 (age 85) Madrid, Spain
- Party: UCD (until 1982); AP (1982–1989); PP (1989–2004)
- Spouse: Cristina Jáuregui Segurola (m. 1975; died 2015)

Miguel Herrero y Rodríguez de Miñón (Note: Also referred to simply as "Miguel Herrero de Miñón".) (born 18 June 1940) is a Spanish jurist and politician. A member of the Union of the Democratic Centre until 1982, then of People's Alliance and its successor, the People's Party, he is one of the "Fathers of the Constitution", the seven legislators who participating in the draft of the Spanish constitutional text passed in 1978.

== Ideology ==
Self-described as an "españolista de la España Grande" (roughly "spanishist of the Great Spain"), Herrero de Miñón has been placed as representative of a fringe strand of nationalism advocate of neoforalism within the Spanish conservative spectrum.

== University education: legal and philosophical ==
Son of high school professor and hispanist Miguel Herrero García, he studied law in Madrid, where, as he says in his Memoirs of Summer, he was "more studious than a student". After graduating in 1961, he earned his doctorate in 1965 with a thesis on the Constitutional Law that emerged after decolonization. He completed his training at Oxford, in Paris and in Louvain, where he graduated in Philosophy in 1968. A lawyer with the Council of State since 1966, he soon began to collaborate with the press -Diario Ya, Diario Madrid, Informaciones-, spreading his ideas about what the transition to the death of Francisco Franco should be.

In 1975, he married Cristina Jáuregui Segurola, daughter of Ramón Jáuregui Epalza and M.ª Luisa Segurola Guereca. They remained married until her death from an unspecified illness in 2015.

== Political activity ==
Rodríguez de Miñón was Technical Secretary General of the Ministry of Justice, collaborating very actively in the first amnesty (1976), in the Law for Political Reform and in the first electoral regulations of the newborn democracy. He participated in the drafting of the 1978 Constitution and held the position of spokesman in the Congress of Deputies, both for the governing party (UCD) and the opposition (AP). He was a deputy for the UCD from 1977 to 1981. Some authors have identified him as one of the architects of the "harassment and demolition operation" against Adolfo Suárez, which reportedly ended with his being crowned head of the UCD parliamentary group. Herrero de Miñón also reportedly maintained contacts with political leaders of the opposition with the aim of removing Suárez from power.

He left UCD in February 1982 and joined People's Alliance in July of that year. He was also elected as an AP and PP deputy in the 1982, 1986 and 1989 elections.

In 1979, he was elected councillor of the Madrid City Council in the April municipal elections. In 1987, he ran for President of People's Alliance, but was defeated by Antonio Hernández Mancha.

Since 2009, he serves as Counsellor of State. As the most senior member, he has served as acting president of the Council of State twice: from 19 October to 10 November 2022 and from 13 to 28 February 2024.

== Decorations and awards ==
- Great Cross of the Order of Isabella the Catholic (1978)
- "Friend of the Basques" Award (1998)
- Creu de Sant Jordi (2000)
- Collar of the Order of Civil Merit (2003)
- Doctor honorary /hon./ Universidad de Buenos Aires (UBA) (2017)
- Doctor honorary /hon./ Universidad Pontificia Comillas (2018)
- Knight of the Order of the Golden Fleece (2025)
