= Tomás Caballero Pastor =

Spanish unionist and politician (1935–1998)

- Born: February 25, 1935; Alfaro, La Rioja, Spain
- Died: May 6, 1998 (aged 63); Pamplona, Spain
- Cause of death: Ballistic trauma
- Occupation: Politician
- Known for: Victim of assassination

Tomás Caballero Pastor (February 25, 1935 – May 6, 1998) was a Spanish unionist and politician from Navarra. He was assassinated by the Basque separatist organization ETA.

== Early years ==
Tomás was born in Alfaro although he grew up in Tudela, in the Spanish foral region of Navarre. He studied in a Jesuit school and at age 18 he joined the Spanish utility company FENSA which would later become Iberdrola. He was a co-founder of the cultural association Muskaria. Two years later he was transferred to the Pamplona headquarters where he worked while he obtained his degree in Topographic Engineering.

== Political activism and ideology ==
In 1963, he became president of the Energy Union in Navarre and in 1967 he was elected President of the Navarrean Workers Council. Through this position, he defended the social and labor rights of all the Navarrean workers in opposition to the official union that Francoist Spain had enabled after the Spanish Civil War. He held this position until 1974. Simultaneously, he became a local council member at the Pamplona city council as a "social councilor" in 1971. In 1976, he was appointed mayor of Pamplona as the transition to democracy had been initiated in Spain and 1977 he resigned this position in order to run for congressman in the first Spanish General Election as a candidate for the Frente Navarro Independiente. He remained a union representative up until 1987. At the same time, from 1984 to 1994 he was elected president of the cultural and sports association Oberena. In 1995 he was elected to the Pamplona city council under the Unión del Pueblo Navarro (UPN) candidate list although he ran as an independent.

Tomás eventually joined UPN and took over the previous spokesman for the local government, Santiago Cervera. He also retired from his job at Iberdrola on 1997 after 42 years of work. On 1998, three political parties in the Pamplona city council (PSN, CDN and IU) forced UPN into the opposition benches. Among the reasons often cited in order to explain why ETA specifically chose Tomás, their UPN fellow party affiliates quote a lawsuit filed by nationalist party Herri Batasuna. Herri Batasuna argued that Tomás had libeled them when in 1998, immediately after the murder of José Ignacio Iruretagoyena, Caballero stated in a response to the city council members from HB who did not vote in favor of an official condemnation of the assassination by the city council:

What you really pretend is to keep murdering so that, in this way, we may become frightened, and by murdering I don't mean exclusively the act of pulling the trigger, but to incite or to support the act of murdering itself. They [the members of HB as well as ETA] want us to get scared and leave but they will not succeed... There are only two sides: that of the democrats, and that of the terrorists and their supporters. Make up your mind and decide which one are you on.

A local judged dismissed the lawsuit. Only a few months later, after a trip with the local government to Yamaguchi, Japan, ETA members assassinated him.

== Murder and public reaction ==
On May 6, 1998, Tomás Caballero was assassinated by ETA members at the doorstep of his house as he was getting ready to leave home for work. At the time of his death, Tomás Caballero was married, and had five children and eight grandchildren. His funeral and burial became a massive show of support towards all victims of terrorism. The fact that Tomás had led a life dedicated to the protection of the rights of workers and the promotion of a more plural, diverse, and democratic Navarre and Spain. Unlike with previous assassinations, members of socialist-secessionist movements in the Basque Country and Navarre such as J. Antonio López Cristóbal, Patxi Zabaleta or Miguel Ángel Muez publicly and unequivocally condemned his assassination and called for ETA to disband.

"All ideas may be freely expressed and defended through free speech and reasoning. They [ETA members and supporters] wish that we shut up and leave but they will not succeed. It is necessary that all democrats close ranks and face these murderers and those who provide them with support. We will not allow that terror and murder become an accepted way of forcing ideas upon the overwhelming majority of our people."

== Legacy ==
These are some of the quotes that define Tomás Caballero's democratic values:

"Freedom and social justice cannot be defended with reasons that stem from power but with the power of reason."

"Those who believe that values and ideas can be murdered are wrong."

"Human rights are my daily catechism."

"One must work hard and work a lot if one is to be able to help others."

== See also ==
- List of unsolved murders (1980–1999)
