= Gotzone Mora =

Spanish politician

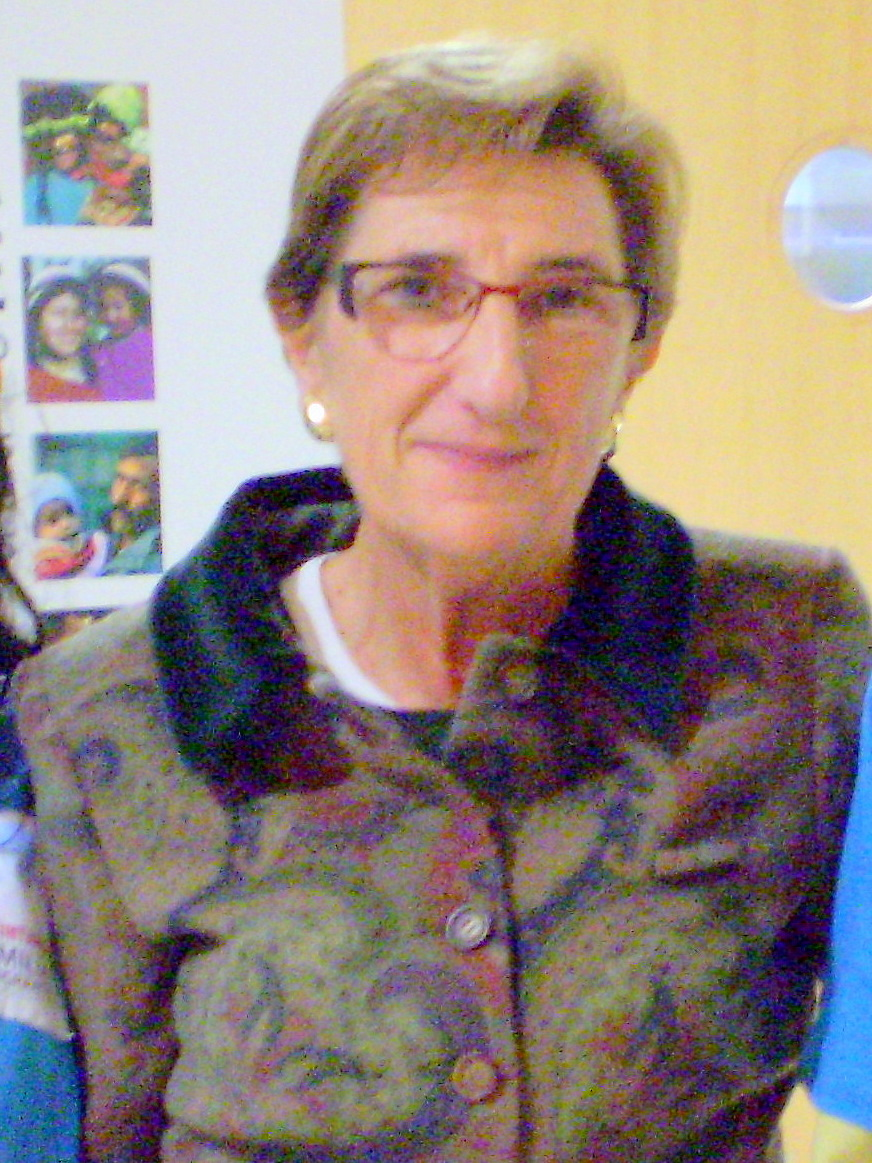
Gotzone Mora after participating in the First Meeting of Immigrant Families by the Church of Valencia

Gotzone Mora (born 1948 in Bilbao) is a Spanish social-democratic politician. She was a member of the Basque Socialist Party ("Euskadiko Alderdi Sozialista – Euskadiko Ezkerra" / "Partido Socialista de Euskadi – Euskadiko Ezkerra"/ PSE-EE) till March 2008 when she was expelled from it for advocating support for the People's Party. Since 2008 she has been a member of the People's Party ("Partido Popular" / PP).

Mora has experience on topics of human migration and global social processes. She was a sociology reader in the University of the Basque Country in Spain. She was an elected member of the Getxo municipality (Biscay) until 2007, and is a member of the intellectual group Foro Ermua (the Ermua Forum) and Democratic Citizenship.

Due to Mora's critical position towards the social policy of the leader of her party, she has a banishment expedient waiting for resolution (2006). She has been targeted by the violent separatist organisation ETA. She has to attend her classes in the university escorted by bodyguards. Mora additionally gives conferences to explain her beliefs about the current political situation in Spain.

== See also ==
- Politics of Spain
