= Constitution of Spain =

Principles, institutions and law of political governance in the modern Kingdom of Spain

Constitution of Kingdom of Spain
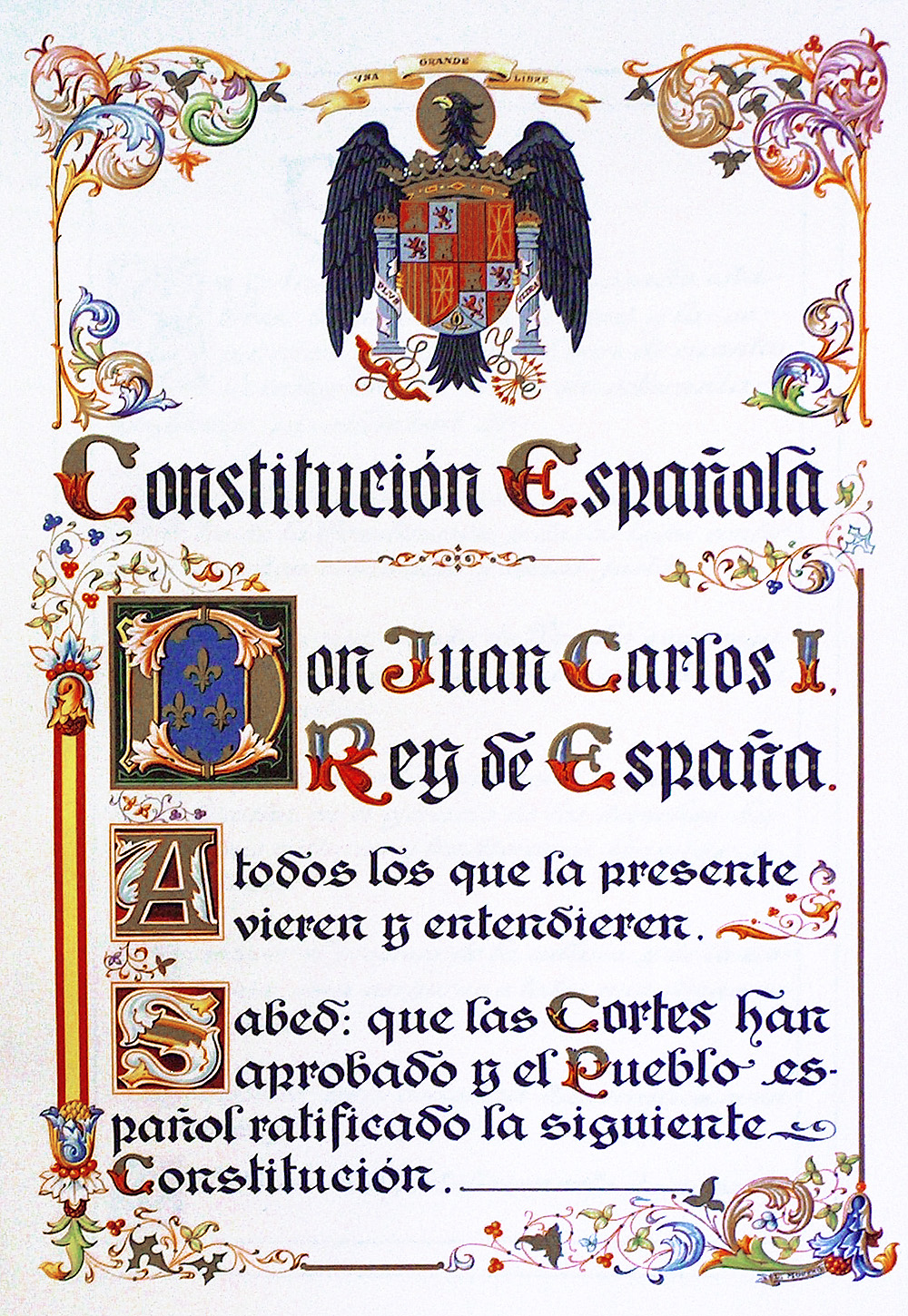
- Created: 31 October 1978
- Ratified: 6 December 1978
- Date effective: 29 December 1978
- System: Parliamentary monarchy

Government structure
- Branches: 3
- Head of state: King
- Chambers: Bicameral
- Executive: Government
- Judiciary: Supreme Court of Spain; Audiencia Nacional; High courts of justice Court of Auditors; Prosecution Ministry

History
- Amendments: 3
- Last amended: 15 February 2024
- Location: Congress of Deputies
- Authors: Fathers of the Constitution: Gabriel Cisneros Laborda (UCD); Miguel Herrero y Rodríguez de Miñón (UCD); José Pedro Pérez-Llorca (UCD); Gregorio Peces-Barba Martínez (PSOE); Jordi Solé Tura (PCE); Manuel Fraga Iribarne (AP); Miquel Roca i Junyent (CDC)

Full text
- Spanish Constitution of 1978 at Wikisource

The Spanish Constitution (Spanish: Constitución Española) (Note: In Asturleonese and Galician: Constitución Española; Basque: Espainiako Konstituzioa; Catalan: Constitució Espanyola; Occitan: Constitucion espanhòla.) is the supreme law of the Kingdom of Spain. It was enacted after its approval in 1978 in a constitutional referendum; it represents the culmination of the Spanish transition to democracy.

The current version was approved in 1978, three years after the death of dictator Francisco Franco. There have been dozens of constitutions and constitution-like documents in Spain; however, it is "the first which was not imposed by a party but represented a negotiated compromise among all the major parties". It was sanctioned by King Juan Carlos I on 27 December, before it was published in the Boletín Oficial del Estado (the government gazette of Spain) on 29 December, the date on which it became effective.

The promulgation of the constitution marked the climax of the Spanish transition to democracy after the death of general Franco, on 20 November 1975, who ruled over Spain as a military dictator for nearly 40 years. This led to the country undergoing a complex process that included a series of political, social and historical changes, gradually transforming the Francoist regime into a democratic state.

The Constitution was redacted, debated and approved by the constituent assembly (Spanish: Cortes Constituyentes) that emerged from the 1977 general election. It then repealed all the Fundamental Laws of the Realm (i.e., the constitution of the Francoist regime), as well as other major historical laws and every pre-existing law that contradicted the new constitution.

== Content summary ==
The Spanish Constitution is a written document that takes cues from both older Spanish constitutions and other then-current European constitutions. For example, it contains the provision for a constructive vote of no confidence, which was inspired by Germany's Basic Law.

The Constitution is organized in ten parts (Spanish: Títulos) and contains an additional introduction (Spanish: Título Preliminar), a preamble, several additional and interim provisions, a series of repeals, and it ends with a final provision.

- Part I refers to fundamental rights and duties, which receive special treatment and protection under Spanish law. Article 1 defines the Spanish state:
  - Article 1.1 states that "Spain is established as a social and democratic state, subject to the rule of law, which advocates as the highest values of its legal order the following: liberty, justice, equality and political pluralism.
  - Article 1.2 refers to national sovereignty, which is vested in the Spanish people, "from whom the powers of the State emanate".
  - Article 1.3 establishes parliamentary monarchy as the "political form of the Spanish state".
- Part II refers to the regulation of the Crown and lays out the King's role in the Spanish state.
- Part III refers to the Cortes Generales (legislature).
- Part IV refers to the Government, the executive power, and the Public Administration, which is managed by the executive.
- Part V refers to the relations between the Government and the Cortes Generales, in which the Prime Minister (Spanish: Presidente del Gobierno) is invested by the legislature and the Government is responsible before the legislature.
- Part VI refers to the organization of the judicial power, establishing that justice emanates from the people and is administered on behalf of the king by judges and magistrates who are independent, irrevocable, liable and subject to the rule of law only.
- Part VII refers to the principles that shall guide the economy and the finances of the Spanish state, subjecting all the wealth in the country to the general interest and recognizing public initiative in the economy, while also protecting private property in the framework of a market economy. It also establishes the Court of Accounts and the principles that shall guide the approval of the state budget.
- Part VIII refers to the "territorial organization of the State" and establishes a unitary state that is nevertheless heavily decentralized through delegation and transfer of powers. The result is a de facto federal model, with some differences from federal states. This is referred to as an autonomous state (Spanish: Estado Autonómico) or state of the autonomies (Spanish: Estado de las Autonomías).
- Part IX refers to the Constitutional Court, which oversees the constitutionality of all laws and protects the fundamental rights enshrined in Part I.
- Part X refers to constitutional amendments, of which there have been only three since 1978 (in 1992, when Article #13 was reformed, in 2011, when Article #135 was reformed, and in 2024, when Article #49 was reformed).

== History ==
The constitutional history of Spain dates back to the Constitution of 1812. After the death of dictator Francisco Franco in 1975, a general election in 1977 convened the Constituent Cortes (the Spanish Parliament, in its capacity as a constitutional assembly) for the purpose of drafting and approving the constitution.

A seven-member panel was selected among the elected members of the Cortes to work on a draft of the Constitution to be submitted to the body. These came to be known, as the media put it, as the padres de la Constitución or "fathers of the Constitution". The seven people were chosen to represent the wide (and often, deeply divided) political spectrum within the Spanish Parliament, while the leading role was given to then ruling party and now defunct Union of the Democratic Centre (UCD).

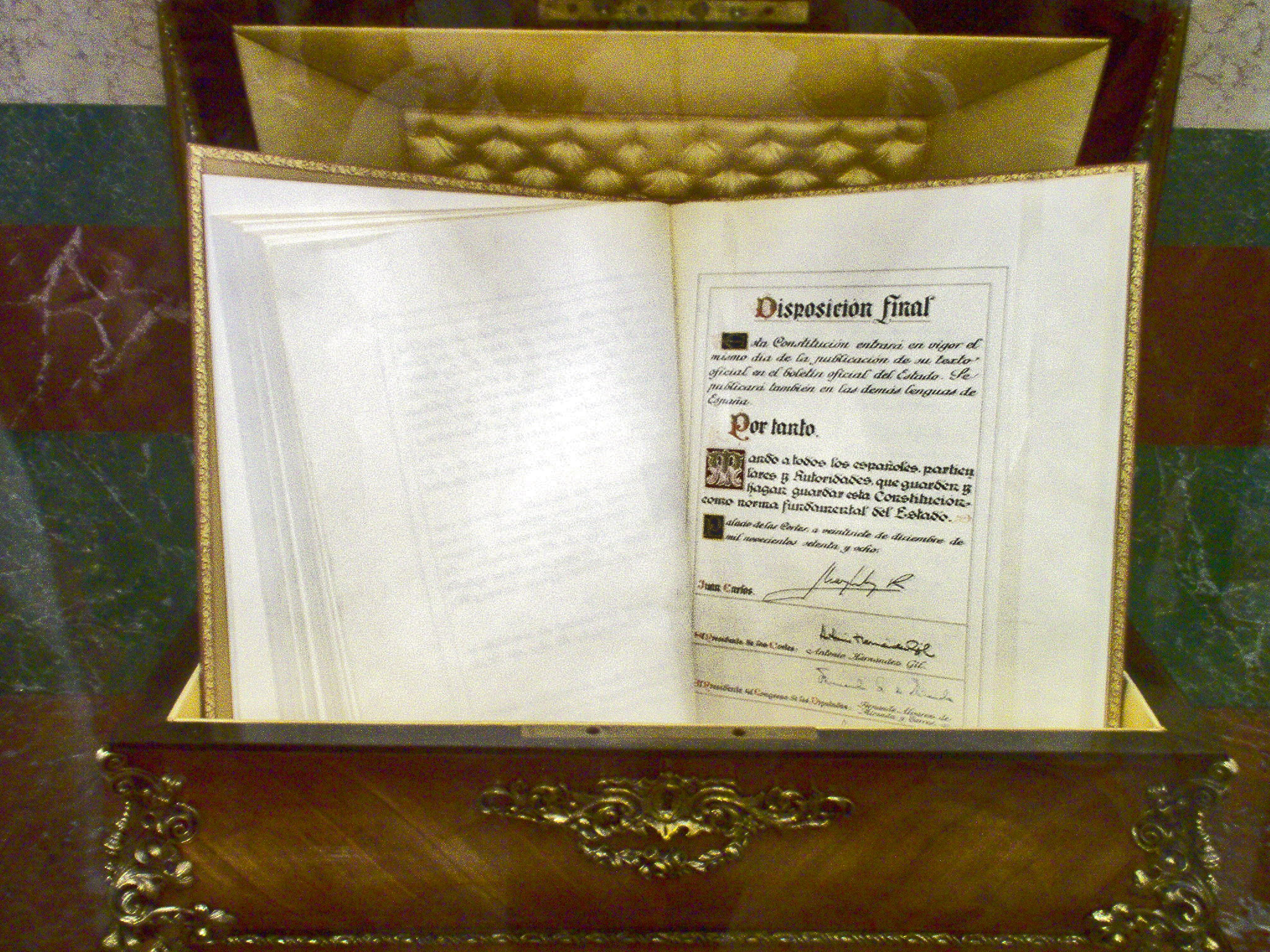
Copy of the Spanish Constitution of 1978 in the Congress of Deputies

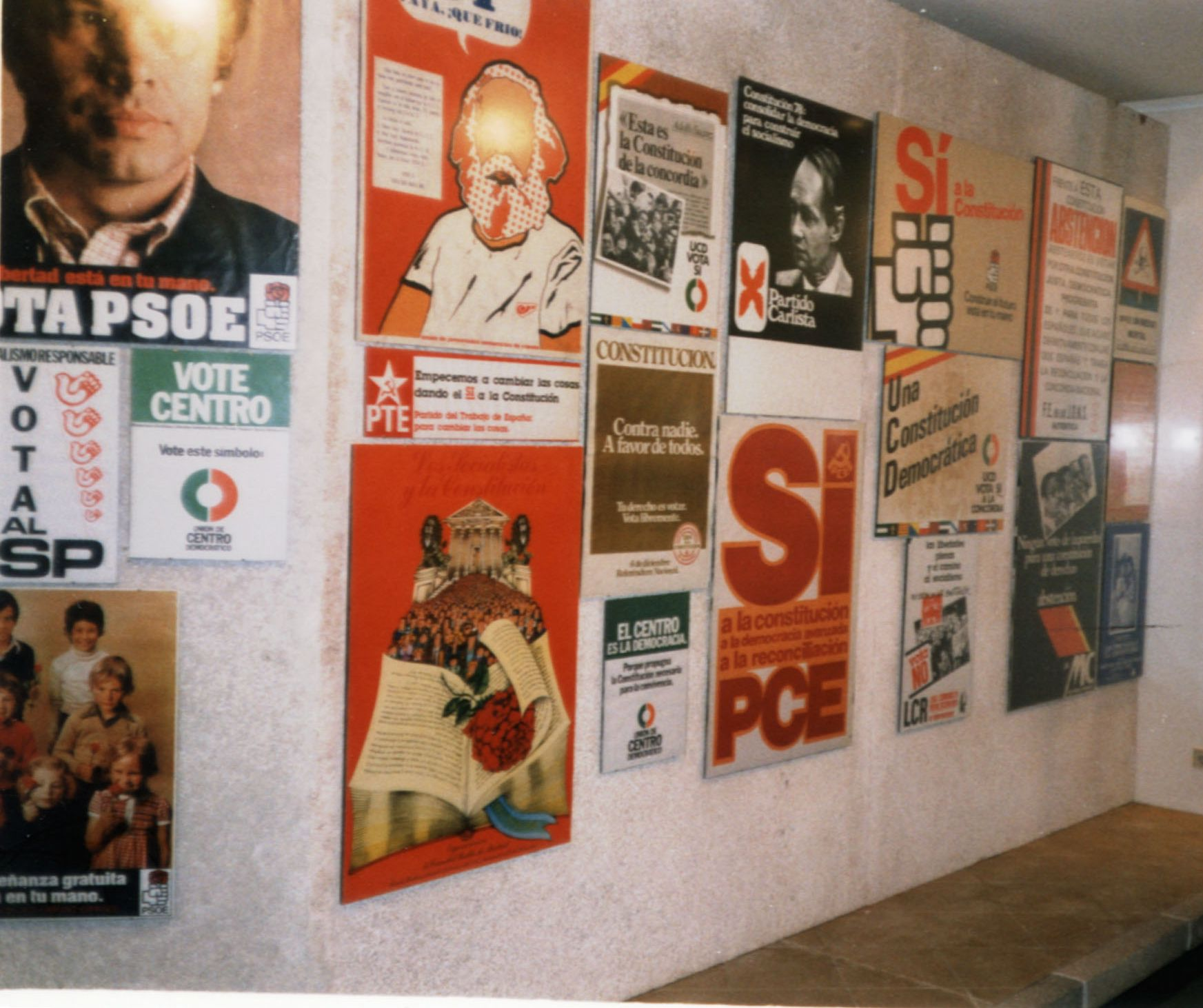
Each of the Spanish parties had its recommendation to voters.

The members included:

- Gabriel Cisneros (UCD)
- José Pedro Pérez-Llorca (UCD)
- Miguel Herrero y Rodríguez de Miñón (UCD)
- Miquel Roca i Junyent (CDC)
- Manuel Fraga Iribarne (AP)
- Gregorio Peces-Barba (PSOE)
- Jordi Solé Tura (PSUC)

The writer (and Senator by Royal appointment) Camilo José Cela later polished the draft Constitution's wording. However, since much of the consensus depended on keeping the wording ambiguous, few of Cela's proposed re-wordings were approved. One of those accepted was the substitution of the archaic gualda ("weld-colored") for the plain amarillo (yellow) in the description of the flag of Spain.

The constitution was approved by the Cortes Generales on 31 October 1978, and by the Spanish people in a referendum on 6 December 1978. 91.81% of voters supported the new constitution. Finally, it was sanctioned by King Juan Carlos on 27 December in a ceremony in the presence of parliamentarians. It came into effect on 29 December, the day it was published in the Official Gazette.

Constitution Day (Spanish: Día de la Constitución) on 6 December has since been a national holiday in Spain.

== Content in-depth ==
The Constitution contains 169 articles as well as a number of additional and transitory provisions.

Notably, the Constitution also formally repealed several important Spanish laws related the political history of the country: the Laws of 25 October 1839 and 21 July 1876, related to the Basque fueros and the aftermath of the Carlist Wars, as well as all of the Fundamental Laws of the Realm were repealed. It also supersedes the Law of 4 January 1977, on Political Reform, which was conceived as a temporary mechanism to loosen restrictions on fundamental rights inherited from the Francoist period.

=== Preamble ===
Traditionally, writing the preamble to the constitution was considered an honour, and a task requiring great literary ability. The person chosen for this purpose was Enrique Tierno Galván. The full text of the preamble may be translated as follows:

Spanish	English
Por Juan Carlos I, Rey de España. A todos los que la presente vieren y entendieren, sabed: que las Cortes han aprobado y el pueblo español ratificado la siguiente Constitución: La Nación española, deseando establecer la justicia, la libertad y la seguridad y promover el bien de cuantos la integran, en uso de su soberanía, proclama su voluntad de:	By Juan Carlos I, King of Spain. To all who see and understand it, know: that the Cortes have approved and the Spanish people ratified the following Constitution: The Spanish Nation, wishing to establish justice, liberty and security, and to promote the welfare of all who make part of it, in use of her sovereignty, proclaims its will to:
Garantizar la convivencia democrática dentro de la Constitución y de las leyes conforme a un orden económico y social justo.	Guarantee democratic life within the Constitution and the laws according to a just economic and social order.
Consolidar un Estado de Derecho que asegure el imperio de la ley como expresión de la voluntad popular.	Consolidate a State ensuring the rule of law as an expression of the will of the people.
Proteger a todos los españoles y pueblos de España en el ejercicio de los derechos humanos, sus culturas y tradiciones, lenguas e instituciones.	Protect all Spaniards and all the peoples of Spain in the exercise of human rights, their cultures and traditions, languages and institutions.
Promover el progreso de la cultura y de la economía para asegurar a todos una digna calidad de vida.	Promote the progress of culture and the economy to ensure a dignified quality of life for all.
Establecer una sociedad democrática avanzada, y	Establish an advanced democratic society, and
Colaborar en el fortalecimiento de unas relaciones pacíficas y de eficaz cooperación entre todos los pueblos de la Tierra.	Collaborate in the strengthening of peaceful and efficient cooperation among all the peoples of the Earth.
En consecuencia, las Cortes aprueban y el pueblo español ratifica la siguiente Constitución.	Consequently, the Cortes approve and the Spanish people ratify the following Constitution.

=== Preliminary Title ===
Section 1. Spain is hereby established as a social and democratic State, subject to the rule of law, which advocates freedom, justice, equality and political pluralism as highest values of its legal system. National sovereignty belongs to the Spanish people, from whom all state powers emanate. The political form of the Spanish State is the Parliamentary Monarchy.

Section 2. The Constitution is based on the indissoluble unity of the Spanish Nation, the common and indivisible homeland of all Spaniards; it recognizes and guarantees the right to self-government of the nationalities and regions of which it is composed and the solidarity among them all.

As a result, Spain is now composed entirely of 17 Autonomous Communities and two autonomous cities with varying degrees of autonomy, to the extent that, even though the Constitution does not formally state that Spain is a federation (nor a unitary state), actual power shows, depending on the issue considered, widely varying grades of decentralization, ranging from the quasi-confederal status of tax management in Navarre and the Basque Country to the total centralization in airport management.

=== Part I: fundamental rights and duties ===
Part I of the Spanish Constitution encompasses Sections 10 to 55, establishing fundamental rights and duties. The scope of the rights recognised by the text is the largest in Spanish constitutional history. Scholars deem the enumeration open insofar as new rights can be included under the principle of human dignity as a foundation of the political order and social peace (Section 10). This can be achieved by means of constitutional reform, jurisprudential developments or the ratification of new international treaties.

The effect of fundamental rights is twofold. They are subjective rights to be exercised both individually and collectively. In addition to this, they are a binding principle for all public authorities, which allows for peaceful coexistence and legitimates the political and social order.

==== Chapter One: Spaniards and Aliens ====
Chapter One deals with the entitlement of constitutional rights. Section 11 provides for the regulation by statute of Spanish nationality whilst providing for its inalienability for Spaniards. Section 12 establishes the age of majority in Spain at 18. Section 13 limits the entitlement of public freedoms to aliens to the provisions of statutes and international treaties.

Legal persons are entitled to a reduced array of rights, among which the right of association, the right to honour, the right to due process of law, freedom of speech and the inviolability of the home are included.

==== Chapter Two: Rights and Freedoms ====
Chapter Two begins with Section 14, an equal rights clause.

Section One, fundamental rights and freedoms

Section One (Sections 15 to 29) includes an enumeration of fundamental rights and public freedoms. This section is entrenched, meaning it is extremely difficult to modify or repeal, in order to prevent the establishment of a legal dictatorship via constitutional amendment. Furthermore, an individual can request the protection of a justice court if any of these rights are infringed.

Individual rights include the right to life (Section 15), freedom of conscience (Section 16), right to freedom and security (Section 17), honour, privacy and inviolability of the home (Section 18), freedom of movement and residence (Section 19), and freedom of speech (Section 20). The list of collective rights include the right of assembly (Section 21), right of association (Section 22), right of suffrage (Section 23), right to education (Section 27) and the right to strike (Section 28). The due process of law is covered by Sections 24 to 26.

Section two, other rights and obligations

Section Two of Chapter Two (Sections 30 to 38) includes a list of civic rights and duties. Section 30 includes military duties with guarantees and alternatives for conscientious objectors (this section has been inactive since 2002). Section 31 establishes a progressive and non-confiscatory tax system. The principles of family law are laid out in Section 32. Chapter Two also deals with the right to property (Section 33), to create foundations (Section 34), to work (Section 35), to create professional associations (Section 36) and to collective bargaining (Section 37). This Section also guarantees economic freedom and calls for a market economy which can be subject to government planning (Section 38).

==== Chapter Three: Governing Principles of Economic and Social Policy ====
Chapter Three includes Sections 39 to 52. They lay out the foundations of the Spanish welfare state in accordance with the constitutional mandate for a social state (Section 1) and for effective freedom and equality and societal integration for all citizens and collectives (Section 9, Part 2). It includes provisions for a public pension system, a social security system, public healthcare and cultural rights.

==== Chapter Four: Guarantees for Fundamental Rights and Freedoms ====
Chapter Four includes a series of guarantees for fundamental rights. Section 53 limits the regulation of all rights in Chapter Two and Chapter Three to statutory law, which excludes administrative regulation (reglamentos). These statutes must respect the essential content of said rights. The fundamental rights and public freedoms included in Section One of Chapter Two can be invoked directly, and they ought to be regulated by means of Organic Law (which ensures greater political consensus). The creation of this statute cannot be delegated to the executive power.

Section 54 calls for the creation of an Ombudsman (Defensor del Pueblo), accountable to the legislative power, the Cortes Generales. It acts as a supervisor of administrative activity. In addition to this, it has standing before the Constitutional Court to lodge unconstitutionality appeals and individual appeals for protection (recurso de amparo).

Sections 14 to 29 and Section 30, Part 2, enjoy the right to a preferential and summary procedure in the ordinary courts. Once this procedure is exhausted, citizens may lodge an individual appeal for protection (recurso de amparo), a last instance unique to Spanish constitutional law and created in 1978 that, once exhausted, allows for an appeal before the European Court of Human Rights. This scope of additional protection reinforces the guarantees of the due process of law, including the process of habeas corpus.

In addition to this, the Prime Minister, the Ombudsman, 50 members of the Congress of Deputies, 50 Senators, and regional governments and legislative assemblies may lodge unconstitutionality appeals before the Constitutional Court.

=== Part II: Crown ===
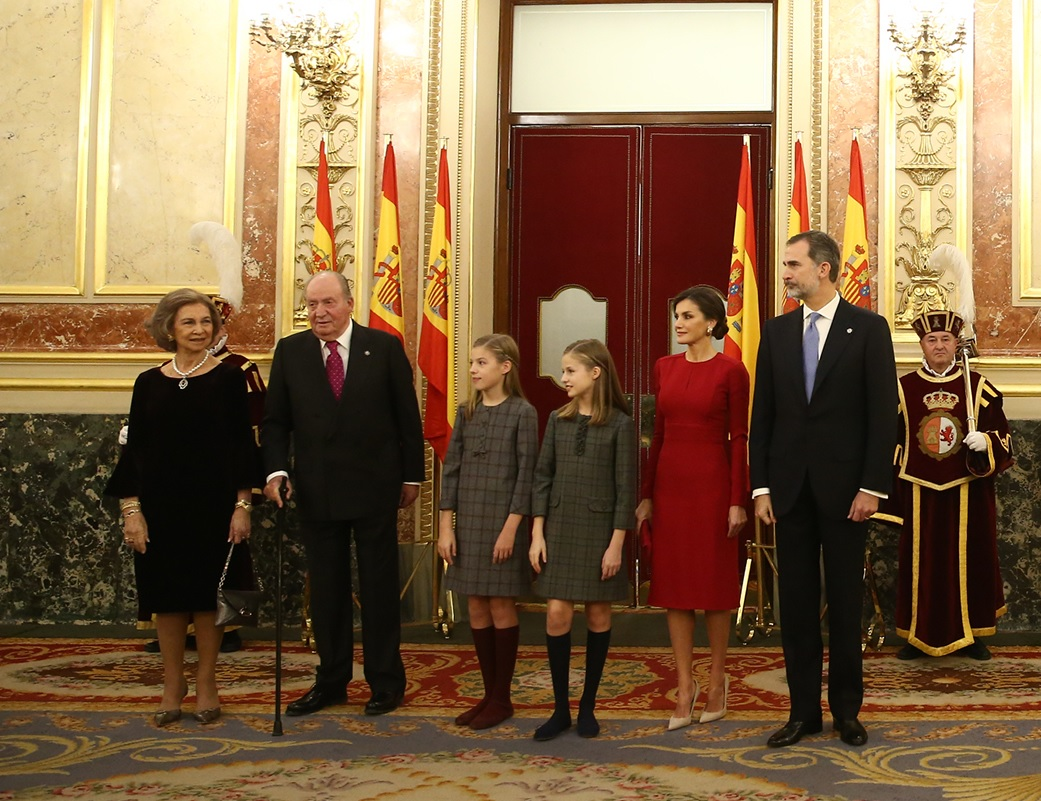
The Spanish royal family, including King Felipe VI (right) and former king Juan Carlos I (second from left) at the 40th anniversary of the ratification of the constitution

Part II of the Constitution establishes the monarchy, which is referred to as "the Crown" (la Corona). Article 56 of the Constitution establishes that the monarch is the head of state and symbolizes the unity of the Spanish state. It refers to the monarch's role as a "moderator" whose main role is to oversee and ensure the regular functioning of the institutions. The monarch is also the highest-ranked representative of the Spanish state in international relations and only exercises the functions that are explicitly attributed to them by the Constitution and the laws. The monarch's official title is King of Spain (Spanish: Rey de España), but he is allowed to use any other titles that are associated to the Spanish Crown.

The monarch enjoys immunity and is not subject to legal accountability. In a broad sense, this means that they cannot be legally prosecuted. Some jurists say that this only refers to criminal procedures, while others claim this immunity is also present in civil procedures; in practice, the monarch has never been prosecuted and it is unlikely that they would be prosecuted even if it was proven that they had committed a crime. The legal justification for royal immunity is that the monarch is mandated by the Constitution to fulfill several roles as the head of state; thus, they are obligated to perform their actions and fulfill their duties. As such, the monarch cannot be judged for constitutionally obligated actions.

==== Refrendo ====
The monarch is vested with executive power, but is not personally responsible for exercising it. This does not mean that their actions are free of responsibility, which falls into the individuals who hold real political power and who actually take political decisions, which are only formally and symbolically ratified by the monarch. This is done through a procedure or institution called the refrendo ("countersigning" in the official English translation of the constitution).

All royal acts have to undergo the refrendo procedure, in which other officials assume legal and political responsibility if it demanded from them. Article 64 explains the refrendo and transfers responsibility for royal acts to the Prime Minister in most cases, though it allows other ministers to assume responsibility for royal acts. In general, when there is not a formed government, such responsibility is assumed by the President of the Congress of Deputies. Without a refrendo, the royal act is null and void.

There are only two royal acts that do not require the refrendo. The first encompasses all acts related to the management of the Royal House of Spain; the monarch can freely hire and fire any employees of the Royal House and receives an annual amount from the state budget to operate the Royal House, which is freely distributed across the institution. The second one refers to the will of the monarch, which enables him or her to distribute their material legacy and name tutors for their children, if they are not legal adults.

==== Role of the monarch ====
Article 62 establishes an exhaustive list of the monarch's functions, all of which are symbolic and do not reflect the exercise of any political power. The monarch sanctions and promulgates laws approved by the Cortes Generales, which the monarch also symbolically and formally calls and dissolves. The monarch also calls for periodic elections and for referendums in the cases that are included by the laws or the Constitution.

The monarch also proposes a candidate for Prime Minister, which is considered their most "political" function, as he or she traditionally holds meetings with the leaders of all the major political parties in order to facilitate the formation of a government. If a candidate is successfully invested by the Parliament, they are named Prime Minister of Spain and can also propose and formally name a cabinet. The monarch has both a right and a duty to be informed of all state affairs and can be invited by the Prime Minister to preside over government meetings.

In relation to the Government, the monarch also formally issues governmental decrees, as well as bestowing civil and military ranks and employments, and can also grant honors and distinctions according to the laws. The monarch is also the supreme head of the Spanish Armed Forces, although the Government holds effective leadership. Finally, the monarch is patron of royal institutions, such as the Royal Spanish Academy.

==== Succession to the Crown ====
The succession to the Crown is regulated in article 57 which establishes a male-preference primogeniture to the successors of King Juan Carlos I and his dynasty, the House of Bourbon-Anjou. The heir to the throne receives the title of Prince or Princess of Asturias, while the other children of the monarch are titled Infantes.

If some person with rights of succession marries against the will of the monarch or the Cortes Generales, they and their descendants are excluded from succession to the Crown. This article also establishes that should the line of succession be exhausted, the Cortes Generales shall decide a new monarch attending to the general interests of the country.

Finally, article 57.5 establishes that abdications or any legal doubt about the succession must be clarified by an Organic Act. This provision was exercised for the first time in 2014, when King Juan Carlos abdicated, which was made effective by Organic Act 3/2014 (issued on 19 June 2014).

==== Regency ====
The Regency is regulated in article 59. The Regency is a period in which a person exercises the duties of the monarch if they are a minor. This article establishes that the office of regent shall be immediately assumed by a parent or the oldest relative of legal age who is nearest in succession to the Crown.

Article 59 § 2 establishes that the monarch may be declared incapacitated by Parliament if the monarch becomes unfit for the exercise of authority, in which case the Prince or Princess of Asturias shall assume the regency if they are of age; if not, the previous procedure must be followed.

If there is no person entitled to exercise the regency, the Cortes Generales shall appoint one regent or a council of three or five persons known as the Council of Regency. The regent must be a Spaniard and legally of age.

Article 60 establishes that the monarch's guardian cannot be the same as the person who acts as regent, unless the regent is a parent or another direct ancestor. Parents can be guardian while widowed. If the parent marries again, the parent loses the guardianship, and the Cortes Generales shall appoint a guardian who must comply with the same requirements as to be regent.

Article 60 § 2 also establishes that the exercise of the guardianship is also incompatible with the holding of any office or political representation so that no person can be the guardian of the monarch while holding a political office.

=== Part III: Cortes Generales ===
Part III (Sections 66 to 96) deals with the Cortes Generales, the Spanish legislature. It consists of two chambers: the Congress of Deputies and the Senate of Spain, with the former being privileged above the latter, in contrast with other upper chambers, such as the Italian Senate of the Republic.

Each chamber is provided with internal regulatory powers for governance, a Speaker (Presidente or Presidenta) and a Governing Board (Mesa). The Permanent Deputation exerts a limited series of powers during recesses and after the dissolution of the chambers. Joint sessions of the Cortes are presided by the Speaker of the Congress of Deputies under a common procedure code passed by a majority of each chamber.

The Cortes exert legislative, budgetary and control powers over the executive. They have the power to appoint members to the Constitutional Court, the General Council of the Judiciary, the Court of Auditors and the Ombudsman. They have control over the line of succession of the Spanish Crown, with the power to appoint Regents, Tutors and to elect a new head of state according to the interest of Spain if the line of succession itself is exhausted.

Each chambers works in a Plenary or by Commissions, work groups with a composition proportional to each party's representation. Commissions may be assigned the study of bills and matters by the Governing Board, and the Plenary may delegate unto them the passing of certain bills, excluding those related to constitutional reform, international matters, organic laws and the budget. Commissions can be legislative and non-legislative, and permanent or temporary.

==== Congress of Deputies ====
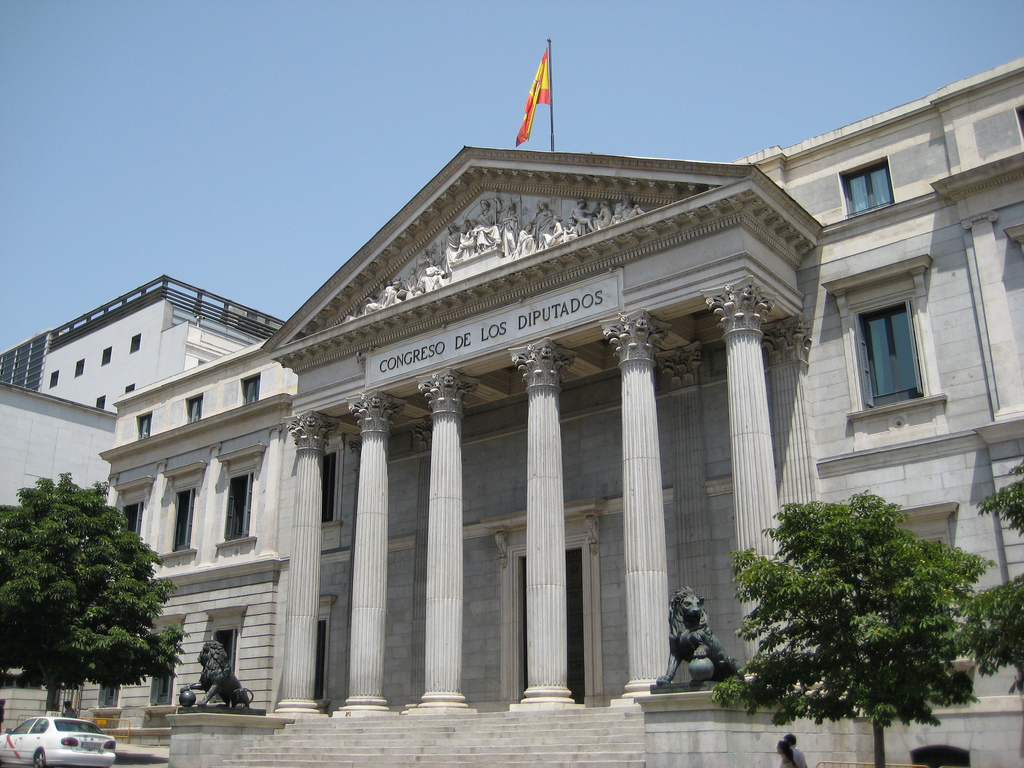
Palacio de las Cortes

Section 68 provides for a lower chamber with a minimum of three hundred and a maximum of four hundred Deputies, elected by universal, free, equal, direct and secret suffrage. The electoral districts are the provinces and the cities of Ceuta and Melilla, with a minimum of two seats for each province and one seat for each city, the rest being apportioned by population. All deputies are elected in each district by proportional representation.

==== Senate ====
Section 69 establishes the Senate as an upper and territorial chamber. It is elected under a mixed system where 208 Senators are elected directly by universal, free, equal, direct and secret suffrage and the rest are indirectly appointed by the legislative assemblies of the autonomous communities.

Senators are elected by limited voting, with citizens being able to elect all but one members of a district. This affords the second most voted party in each district a degree of representation.

The attributions of the Spanish Senate are subordinate to those of the Spanish Congress, which makes it comparable to the Senate of Canada or the House of Councillors of the National Diet of Japan insofar as it may exert limited control and review powers over the lower chamber.

=== Part IV: government ===
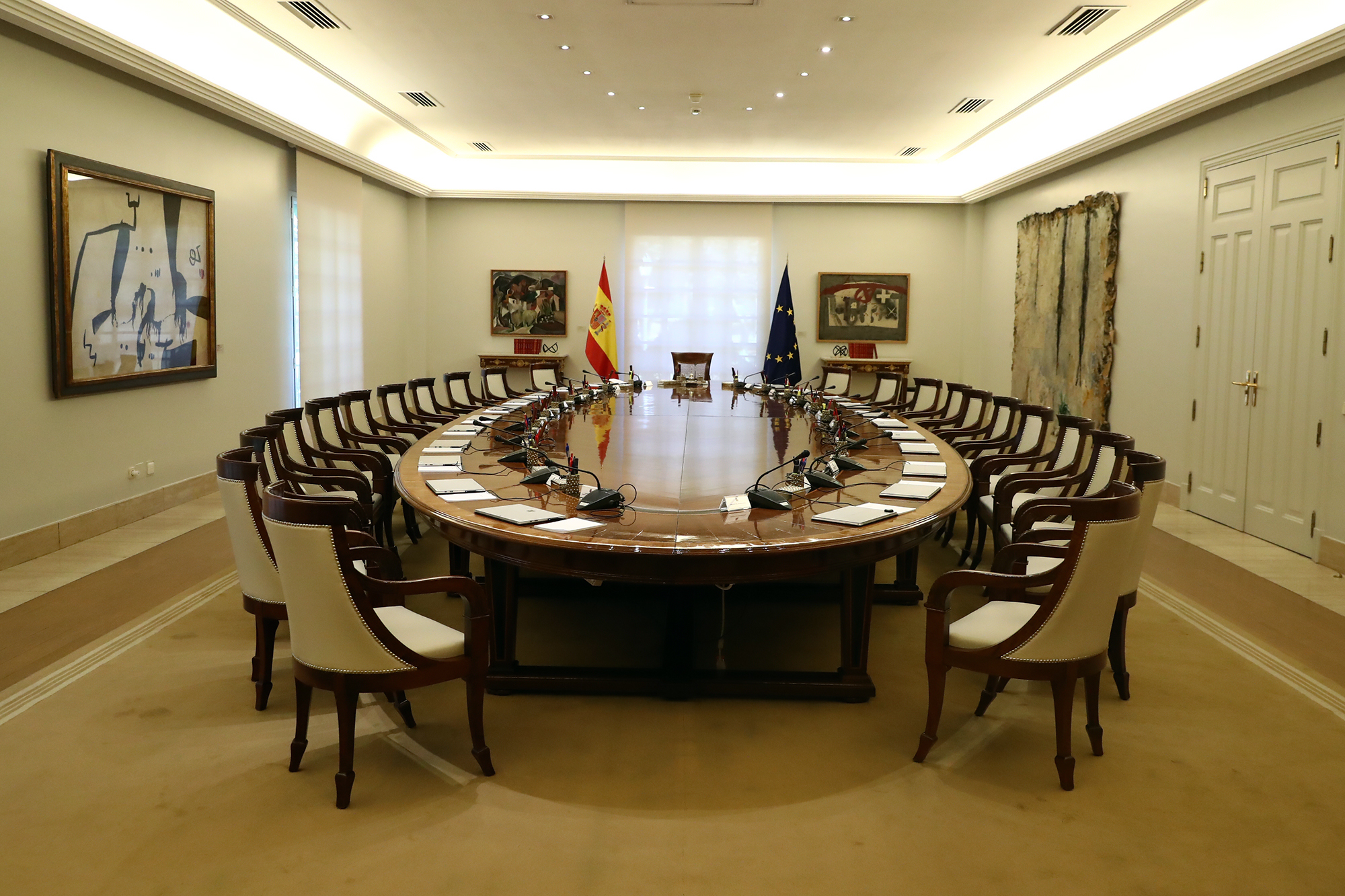
Meeting room of the Council of Ministers

Section 97 vests the executive power in the Government of Spain, which runs the country's domestic and foreign policy, the civil and military administration and the national defense.

Section 98 states that the Government shall be composed of the President (referred to in English as the Prime Minister), the Vice Presidents if any (referred to in English as the Deputy Prime Ministers), and any other members listed in statute. The Prime Minister runs the Government's policy and coordinates the faculties of the others members of the Government.

Section 99 describes the procedure of appointment of the Prime Minister. After an election, or any other event that triggers an appointment, the King shall meet with all the leaders of the political groups in the Cortes Generales, then choose one of them to face an investiture vote. The President of the Congress of Deputies holds veto power over the King's choice. The investiture vote is successful, and the nominee becomes Prime Minister, if he gets the absolute majority vote of the Congress of Deputies in the first roll call, or a simple majority (more yeas than noes) in a second roll call that takes place two days after the first. The process can be repeated with the same or other political leader chosen by the King within two months after the first roll call; after that time, a general election to both chambers is automatically called.

Section 100 states that the ministers are appointed and dismissed by the King by the Prime Minister's proposal.

Section 101 states that the Government is dismissed after a general election, the loss of supply or confidence of the Congress of Deputies, or the resignation or death of the Prime Minister. The dismissed Government holds caretaker powers until a new Government is inaugurated.

Section 102 establishes the conditions for prosecution of criminal accountability for the Prime Minister or any other member of the Government, explicitly stating they cannot pardon themselves.

Sections 103 to 107 establish the role of the General State Administration, the law enforcement organizations, the Council of State, and the obligation of the Government to grant due process, to abide by judiciary decisions and to fulfill any public liability to the individuals.

=== Part V: relations between the Cortes Generales and the government ===
Article 115 deals with the mechanisms of how and when Congress, the Senate, or the Cortes Generales can be dissolved. This measure requires approval from the King of Spain, who must establish a date for the elections. The proposal for dissolution cannot be submitted during a censure.

==== Article 116 ====
Section 1. A state of alarm shall be declared by the Government, by means of a decree decided upon by the Council of Ministers, for a maximum period of fifteen days. The Congress of Deputies shall be informed and must meet immediately for this purpose. Without their authorisation, the said period may not be extended. The decree shall specify the territorial area to which the effects of the proclamation shall apply.
Section 2. A state of emergency shall be declared by the Government by means of a decree decided upon by the Council of Ministers, after prior authorisation by the Congress of Deputies. The authorisation for and declaration of a state of emergency must specifically state the effects thereof, the territorial area to which it is to apply and its duration, which may not exceed thirty days, subject to extension for a further thirty-day period, with the same requirements.
Section 3. A state of siege (martial law) shall be declared by absolute majority of the Congress of Deputies, exclusively at the proposal of the Government. Congress shall determine its territorial extension, duration and terms.

For the duration where any of those acts of Article 116 are declared, Congress cannot be dissolved. In the event that Congress had been dissolved or its term expires, the powers of Congress are assumed by the Standing Committee. Since the constitution of Spain was adopted, the state of alarm was only declared twice: once in 2010 for the Spanish air traffic controllers strike, and in March 2020 for the COVID-19 pandemic. The first state of emergency was declared in October 2020 as a result of continued difficulties for the COVID-19 pandemic.

=== Part VI: judiciary ===
Article 117 establishes the independence of the judiciary and the law. In cases of martial law, military activity is limited by the Constitution. Articles 119 to 120 establish the right to a public, fair trial, with the right to an attorney for indigent defendants. Article 121 mandates compensation in case of damages caused by legal irregularities. Article 127 forbids serving magistrates and prosecutors from political party membership or public office.

=== Part VII: economy and taxation ===
Article 128 allows the State to intervene in corporate affairs to restrict monopolies or serve the public interest.

Deficits and debt shall not exceed standards set by the European Union.

=== Part VIII: territorial model ===
==== Article 143 ====
Section 1. In the exercise of the right to self-government recognized in Article 2 of the Constitution, bordering provinces with common historic, cultural and economic characteristics, island territories and provinces with historic regional status may accede to self-government and form Autonomous Communities in conformity with the provisions contained in this Title and in the respective Statutes.

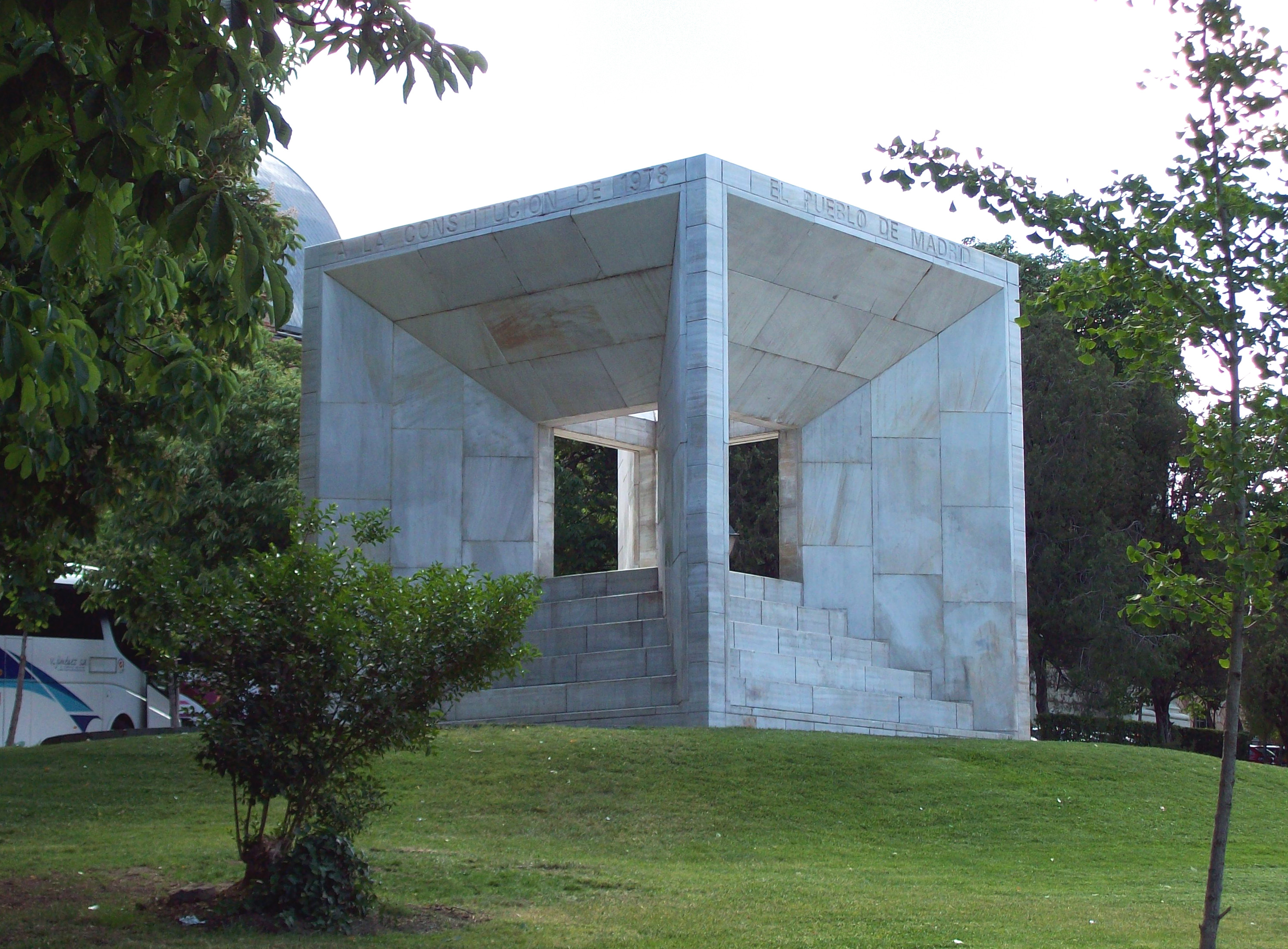
Monument to the Constitution of 1978 in Madrid

The Spanish Constitution is one of the few Bill of Rights that has legal provisions for social rights, including the definition of Spain itself as a "Social and Democratic State, subject to the rule of law" (Spanish: Estado social y democrático de derecho) in its preliminary title. However, those rights are not at the same level of protection as the individual rights contained in articles 14 to 28, since those social rights are considered in fact principles and directives of economic policy, but never full rights of the citizens to be claimed before a court or tribunal.

Other constitutional provisions recognize the right to adequate housing, (Note: Article 47 of the Spanish Constitution states: "All Spaniards have the right to enjoy decent and adequate housing. The public authorities shall promote the necessary conditions and establish appropriate standards in order to make this right effective, regulating land use in accordance with the general interest in order to prevent speculation. The community shall have a share in the benefits accruing from the town-planning policies of public bodies".) employment, (Note: Article 40 states: "The public authorities shall promote favourable conditions for social and economic progress and for a more equitable distribution of regional and personal income within the framework of a policy of economic stability. They shall in particular carry out a policy aimed at full employment.") social welfare provision, (Note: Article 41 states: "The public authorities shall maintain a public Social Security system for all citizens guaranteeing adequate social assistance and benefits in situations of hardship, especially in case of unemployment. Supplementary assistance and benefits shall be optional.") health protection (Note: Article 43 states: "The right to health protection is recognized. It is incumbent upon the public authorities to organize and watch over public health by means of preventive measures and the necessary benefits and services. The law shall establish the rights and duties of all in this respect.") and pensions. (Note: Article 50 states: "The public authorities shall guarantee, through adequate and periodically updated pensions, a sufficient income for citizens in old age. Likewise, and without prejudice to the obligations of the families, they shall promote their welfare through a system of social services that provides for their specific problems of health, housing, culture and leisure.")

Thanks to the political influence of Santiago Carrillo of the Communist Party of Spain, and with the consensus of the other "fathers of the constitution", the right to State intervention in private companies in the public interest and the facilitation of access by workers to ownership of the means of production were also enshrined in the Constitution.

==== Article 155 ====
Section 1. If a self-governing community does not fulfil the obligations imposed upon it by the constitution or other laws, or acts in a way that is seriously prejudicial to the general interest of Spain, the government may take all measures necessary to compel the community to meet said obligations, or to protect the above-mentioned general interest.
Section 2. With a view to implementing the measures provided for in the foregoing paragraph, the Government may issue instructions to all the authorities of the Self-governing Communities.

This wording is almost identical to Article 37 of the German Basic Law.

On October 27, 2017, the Senate of Spain (Senado) voted 214 to 47 to invoke Article 155 of the Spanish Constitution over Catalonia after the Catalan Parliament unilaterally declared independence. Article 155 gave Spanish Prime Minister Rajoy the power to remove secessionist politicians, including Carles Puigdemont, the Catalan leader, and directly rule from Madrid.

=== Part IX: Constitutional Court ===
The King appoints all twelve members of the Constitutional Court. Four are nominated by a 3/5 majority in Congress; four are nominated by a 3/5 majority in the Senate. Two are nominated by the government, and the last two by the General Council of the Judiciary. They can serve a maximum of 9 years divided into three 3-year renewable terms. Serving magistrates and prosecutors, politicians, political party members, or active businessmen can not serve on the Constitutional Court.

=== Part X: constitutional amendment ===
There are two methods of amending the Spanish Constitution, detailed below. The Government, the Congress of Deputies or the Senate can propose constitutional amendments. The Parliaments of the Autonomous Communities can also propose a constitutional amendment to the Congress or the Government, but cannot propose an amendment directly.

There have been 3 amendments to the Spanish constitution, one in 1992, one in 2011 and one in 2024, all were passed with the necessary majority and without a referendum being requested.

==== Ordinary provisions ====
A constitutional amendment must be approved by a three-fifths majority by both the Congress of Deputies and the Senate. If there is disagreement between the Chambers, a mixed committee will present an agreed text to both chambers for a vote. Even if this procedure fails, and as long as the amendment passed with a simple majority in the Senate, Congress may pass the amendment with two-thirds majority. One-tenth of either deputies or senators may also request, with a 15-day deadline since passage, that the amendment be put to a referendum.

==== Entrenched provisions ====
Three parts of the Constitution are entrenched: the Preliminary Title, Section I of Chapter II of Title I (on Fundamental Rights and Public Liberties), and Title II (on the Crown). Under Title X, these cannot be altered except by the same process that would be required for adoption of a new constitution:

- two-thirds of each House approve the amendment,
- elections are called immediately thereafter,
- two-thirds of each new House approves the amendment, and
- the amendment is approved by the people in a referendum.

== Amendments ==
The Constitution has been amended three times. The first time, Article 13.2, Title I was altered to extend to citizens of the European Union the right to active and passive suffrage (both voting rights and eligibility as candidates) in local elections under the provisions of the Maastricht Treaty. The second time, in August/September 2011, a balanced budget amendment and debt brake was added to Article 135. The third amendment, passed in January 2024, amends the language of Article 49 to read "persons with disabilities", rather than those who are "handicapped".

=== Reform of the autonomy statutes ===
The "Statutes of Autonomy" of the different regions are the second most important Spanish legal normatives when it comes to the political structure of the country. Because of that, the reform attempts of some of them have been either rejected or produced considerable controversy.

The plan conducted by the Basque president Juan José Ibarretxe (known as Ibarretxe Plan) to reform the status of the Basque Country in the Spanish state was rejected by the Spanish Cortes, on the grounds (among others) that it amounted to an implicit reform of the Constitution.

The People's Party attempted to reject the admission into the Cortes of the 2005 reform of the Autonomy Statute of Catalonia on the grounds that it should be dealt with as a constitutional reform rather than a mere statute reform because it allegedly contradicts the spirit of the Constitution in many points, especially the Statute's alleged breaches of the "solidarity between regions" principle enshrined by the Constitution. After failing to assemble the required majority to dismiss the text, the People's Party filed a claim of unconstitutionality against several dozen articles of the text before the Spanish Constitutional Court for them to be struck down.

The amended Autonomy Statute of Catalonia has also been legally contested by the surrounding Autonomous Communities of Aragon, Balearic Islands and the Valencian Community on similar grounds as those of the PP, and others such as disputed cultural heritage. As of January 2008, the Constitutional Court of Spain has those alleged breaches and its actual compliance with the Constitution under judicial review.

Prominent Spanish politicians, mostly from the People's Party but also from the Socialist Party (PSOE) and other non-nationalist parties, have advocated for the statutory reform process to be more closely compliant with the Constitution, on the grounds that the current wave of reforms threatens the functional destruction of the constitutional system itself. The most cited arguments are the self-appointed unprecedented expansions of the powers of autonomous communities present in recently reformed statutes:

- The amended version of the Catalan Statute prompts the State to allot investments in Catalonia according to Catalonia's own percentage contribution to the total Spanish GDP. The Autonomy Statute of Andalusia, a region that contributes less to Spain's GDP than the region of Catalonia contributes, requires it in turn to allocate state investments in proportion to its population (it is the largest Spanish Autonomous Community in terms of population). These requirements are legally binding, as they are enacted as part of Autonomy Statutes, which rank only below the Constitution itself. It is self-evident that, should all autonomous communities be allowed to establish their particular financing models upon the State, the total may add up to more than 100% and that would be unviable. Despite these changes having been proposed and approved by fellow members of the PSOE, former Finance Minister Pedro Solbes disagreed with this new trend of assigning state investment quotas to territories based on any given autonomous community custom requirement and has subsequently compared the task of planning the Spanish national budget to a sudoku.
- The Valencian statute, whose reform was one of the first to be enacted, includes the so-called Camps clause (named after the Valencian President Francisco Camps), which makes any powers assumed by other communities in its statutes automatically available to the Valencian Community.
- Autonomous communities such as Catalonia, Aragon, Andalusia or Extremadura, have included statutory clauses claiming exclusive powers over any river flowing through their territories. Nearby communities have filed complaints before the Spanish Constitutional Court on the grounds that no Community can exercise exclusive power over rivers that cross more than one Community, not even over the part flowing through its territory because its decisions affect other Communities, both downstream or upstream.

== Proposed amendments ==
Amnesty International Spain, Oxfam Intermón and Greenpeace launched a campaign in 2015 to amend the article 53 so that it extends the same protection to economic, social and cultural rights as to other rights like life or freedom. After that, the campaign seeks another 24 amendments protecting human rights, the environment and social justice.

The third government of Pedro Sánchez proposed to enshrine the right to abortion, amid disputes with the local and regional governments in Madrid. The legal via would be modifying article 43. This would not require the dissolution of the chambers or a referendum but still the requisite parliamentary majorities would require the collaboration of opposition People's Party, for which abortion is a wedge issue. In 2024, the junior partner party Sumar proposed a similar enshrinement but Sánchez's PSOE dismissed it at the moment.

=== Reform of the Senate ===
In the late 1990s, the Catalan nationalist party, Convergence and Union, attempted to reform the Senate based on three tiers of autonomous communities. However, the People's Party government suspended these attempts.

== See also ==
- List of constitutions of Spain
- Constitutional economics
- Constitutionalism
- Rule according to higher law
