= Gregorio Peces-Barba =

Spanish politician and jurist

The Most Excellent Gregorio Peces-Barba
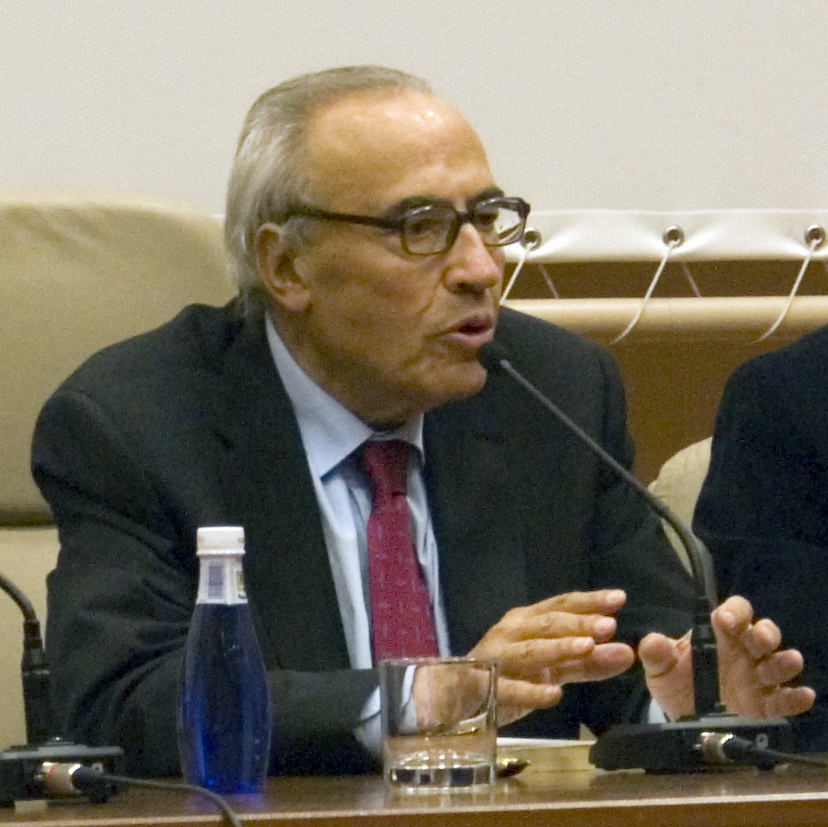
- Peces-Barba in 2011.
- Born: Gregorio Peces-Barba Martínez; 13 January 1938; Madrid, Spain
- Died: 24 July 2012; Oviedo, Spain

Gregorio Peces-Barba Martínez (13 January 1938 – 24 July 2012) was a Spanish politician and jurist. He was one of the seven jurists who wrote the Spanish Constitution of 1978, acting as a representative of the Spanish Socialist Workers' Party.

Peces-Barba was born in Madrid. He studied Law in Madrid and Strasbourg, writing his thesis about Jacques Maritain. He was a member of the Socialist Party since 1972 and was chosen as congressman for the province of Valladolid in 1977 in the first democratic elections in Spain in forty years. He was one of the seven jurists who wrote the constitution approved in referendum in 1978, and so he is considered a father of the constitution. In 1982 he was elected president of the congress of deputies and held that chair until 1986 when he decided not to rerun. He helped to create the Charles III University of Madrid and from 1989 until 2007 he was rector of that university.

He was chosen by president José Luis Rodríguez Zapatero to be High Commissioner for the help of the victims of terrorism in 2004. He was strongly criticised by the Asociación de Víctimas del Terrorismo and decided to resign in 2006. No successor was chosen.

He died on 24 July 2012, aged 74, in Oviedo, Spain.

== Honors ==
- 2010 – Gold Medal of Merit in Labour (Kingdom of Spain, 7 December 2010).
