= Gabriel Cisneros =

Spanish attorney and politician

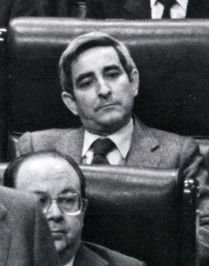

Personal details
- Born: Gabriel Cisneros Laborda; 14 August 1940 Tarazona, Zaragoza, Spain
- Died: 27 July 2007 (aged 66) Murcia, Spain
- Party: Union of the Democratic Centre, Liberal Party, People's Party
- Occupation: Attorney; Politician

Gabriel Cisneros Laborda (14 August 1940 – 27 July 2007) was a Spanish attorney and politician who is mostly known for being one of the Fathers of the Spanish Constitution of 1978 He is also credited with collaborating in the writing the European Union's Declaration of Human Rights.

== Career ==
Cisneros was one of seven politicians charged with writing the Spanish Constitution of 1978, Spain's first democratic constitution, following the death of caudillo Francisco Franco in 1975. The constitution set the foundation for the Spanish Government from the 1978 up to the present day. Cisneros is also the author of several other Spanish institutional laws.

Additional, Cisneros also helped to write laws pertaining to the Basque statute and autonomy. His work with Basque law made Cisneros a kidnapping target. Cisneros survived a 1979 kidnap attempt by the Basque separatist group, ETA. Cisneros managed to fight off and escape two ETA kidnappers, but suffered gunshot wounds to his stomach and leg.

Cisneros was a member of the Union of the Democratic Centre (UCD) and in 1979 was elected to the Spanish Congress of Deputies as member for Soria. He retained his seat at the 1982 election however the UCD lost 156 of their 168 seats at that election and disbanded in February 1983 after which Cisneros sat as an independent. He did not stand at the 1986 election and temporarily retired from active politics. However he resumed his political activity in 1988 when he joined the Liberal Party. In 1989 that party merged with others to form the current People's Party (PP), a Spanish conservative political party. At the 1989 General Election he returned to the Spanish Congress as a PP deputy for Burgos and was re-elected in that district in 1993 and 1996. At the 2000 election he was elected in Zaragoza and represented that district until his death in 2007. Cisneros held a number of key posts as an MP.

Between 1980 and 1982 he served as Secretary-General for Relations with the Cortes, with the rank of secretary of state since March 1981.

Cisneros made his last parliamentary appearance in the Cortes Generales in July 2007 for ceremonies marking the 30th anniversary of Spain's first democratic elections in 1977. King Juan Carlos honored Cisneros and other key figures of Spain's transition to democracy following Franco's death saying the reformers, "have allowed us to avoid harsh and sterile confrontations in the normal development of our political life."

== Death ==
Cisneros died of complications from a stroke on 27 July 2007, in Murcia. His death was announced in Parliament that same day.

Mariano Rajoy, leader of the opposition PP party, called Cisneros "an extraordinary politician." Spain's governing Socialist Party also paid tribute to Cisneros: "He contributed in an important way to the consolidation of our democratic system."
