= Jordi Solé Tura =

Spanish politician (1930–2009)

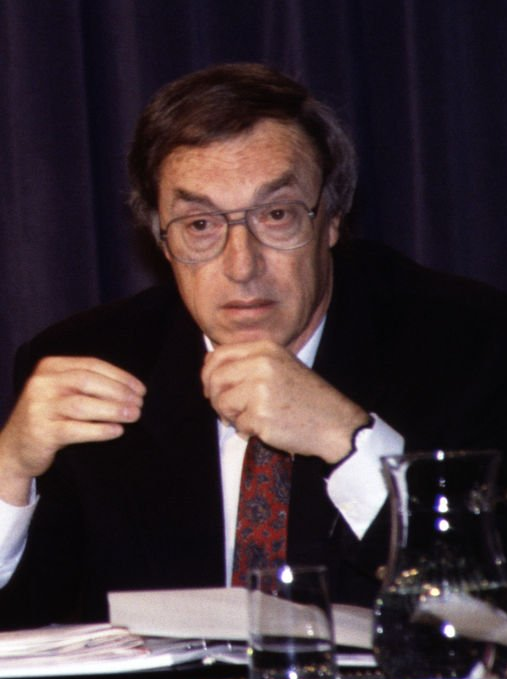
Jordi Solé Tura (1991)

Jordi Solé Tura (23 May 1930 in Mollet del Vallés – 4 December 2009 in Barcelona) was a Spanish politician, jurist and one of the co-authors and "Fathers" of the Spanish Constitution of 1978 following Spain's move to democracy.

From his youth Tura belonged to different leftish organizations, such as Popular Liberation Front and Bandera Roja. In the early years of the democracy he worked in the Unified Socialist Party of Catalonia.

Inside the PSUC he worked with PCE leader Santiago Carrillo in defense of Eurocommunism. He was elected to Spain's Congress of Deputies in June 1977 and again in March 1979. He was one of the seven "Fathers of the Constitution" (politicians charged with writing a new constitution).

He left the PCE and joined the Socialist Party (PSC-PSOE) and was elected anew for the province of Barcelona in 1989, 1993 and 1996.

In 1985 he was elected Dean of University of Barcelona's Law School.

He was Minister of Culture under Felipe Gonzalez from March 1991 to July 1993.

In 2008 he was the center of a documentary called Bucarest, la memoria perdida that was filmed by his son Albert Solé. The documentary covered his life and his fight against Alzheimer's disease, and was awarded a Goya.
