= Foro Ermua =

Civic association in Basque Country, Spain

Asociación Foro Ermua
- Formation: 13 January 1998; 28 years ago
- Legal status: Association
- Region served: Spain
- President: Mikel Buesa
- Website: www.foroermua.com

The Foro Ermua (English: Ermua Forum) was a Spanish civic association, whose members were Spanish citizens, primarily living in the Basque Country. It was founded on 13 January 1998; its last president was Mikel Buesa.

The organisation states that its formation was brought about by the killing of Miguel Ángel Blanco, a conservative city council member in Ermua in Biscay, by members of the Basque separatist group ETA. (This assassination had taken place on 12 July 1997, several months before the Foro Ermua was founded.) Prior to the Forum's official foundation, Blanco's killing also resulted in a local movement called espíritu de Ermua, or "Ermua spirit", which was a general feeling of solidarity that sprung up amongst many local people after Blanco's kidnapping and death. Members of the organisation consider its foundation to be an attempt to continue the 'Ermua spirit'.

The organisation views its activities as democratic in nature and in line with the existing structures of the Spanish state, in contrast to what they describe as the "nationalistic fascism" of ETA's views. Although they do not openly align themselves with any political party, its members tend to be associated either with the Spanish conservative party, the People's Party (Spain), or with the centrist Union, Progress and Democracy, or they are independent conservatives.

The forum lists the following objectives:

- To support, to protect, and to promote recognition of the victims of Basque terrorism. (Some members of the Forum have been attacked by ETA themselves; the first president of Foro Ermua, Vidal de Nicolás, is protected by private bodyguards).
- To aid the unity of constitutionalist forces in Basque Country against Basque Nationalists and Independentists.
- To denounce violent acts carried out by ETA forcefully and decisively.
- To avoid any political negotiation between ETA or its representatives and the government, except for the presentation of an official government order for ETA to surrender and disband.

== Criticism ==
Critics of the Ermua forum, mainly members of the radical pro-independence Basque movement, have accused it of being a front for conservative Spanish political forces opposed to Basque Self-determination, independence and Nationalism.
