= Zapatero government =

The term Zapatero government may refer to:

- Governments of Rodríguez Zapatero
  - First government of José Luis Rodríguez Zapatero, the government of Spain from 2004 to 2008
  - Second government of José Luis Rodríguez Zapatero, the government of Spain from 2008 to 2011
