= Premiership of José Luis Rodríguez Zapatero =

Fourth period of the reign of Kind Juan Carlos I of Spain

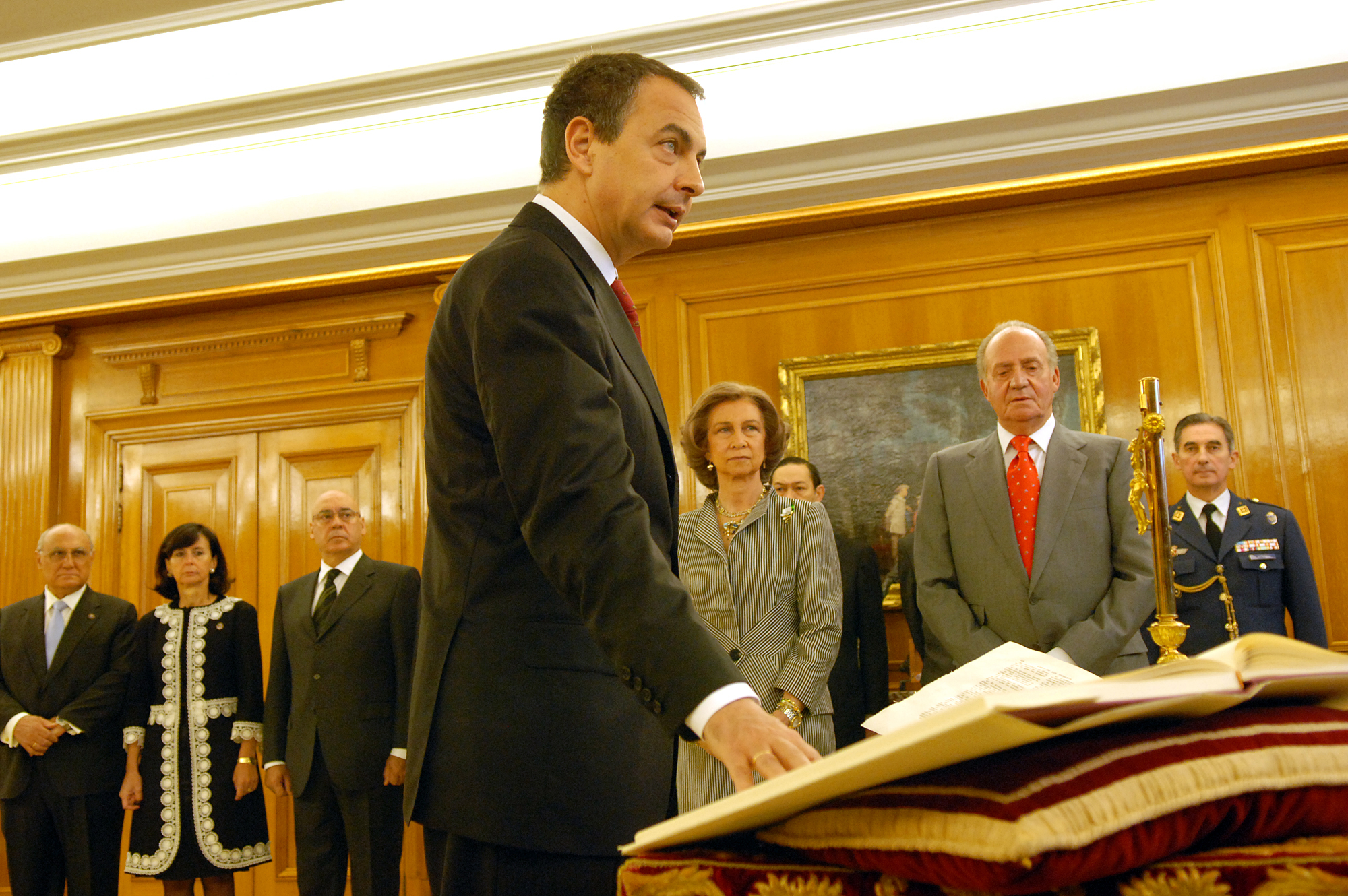
José Luis Rodríguez Zapatero taking office for the second time in 2008.

The premiership of Rodríguez Zapatero (2004–2011) mark the fourth period of the reign of King Juan Carlos I of Spain. The nearly eight years during which José Luis Rodríguez Zapatero governed Spain—marking the second socialist government in the monarchy, after the governments of Felipe González (1982–1996)—encompassed two very different legislative terms. "The first term was marked by major political debates on civil and social rights, the territorial model, negotiations with ETA, and historical memory, while the second term was dominated by the economic crisis, which wiped out all of the government's projects. Zapatero's actions were also very different in each case. In his first term, he took on enormous political risks, was bold and original in many of his initiatives, and as a result received overwhelming support among left-wing citizens in 2008. In his second term, Zapatero was behind the times...". Thus, according to political scientist Ignacio Sánchez-Cuenca, the first term (2004–2008) were "years of change" and the second (2008–2011) "years of crisis."

== Return of the PSOE to power: "11-M" attacks and 2004 elections ==
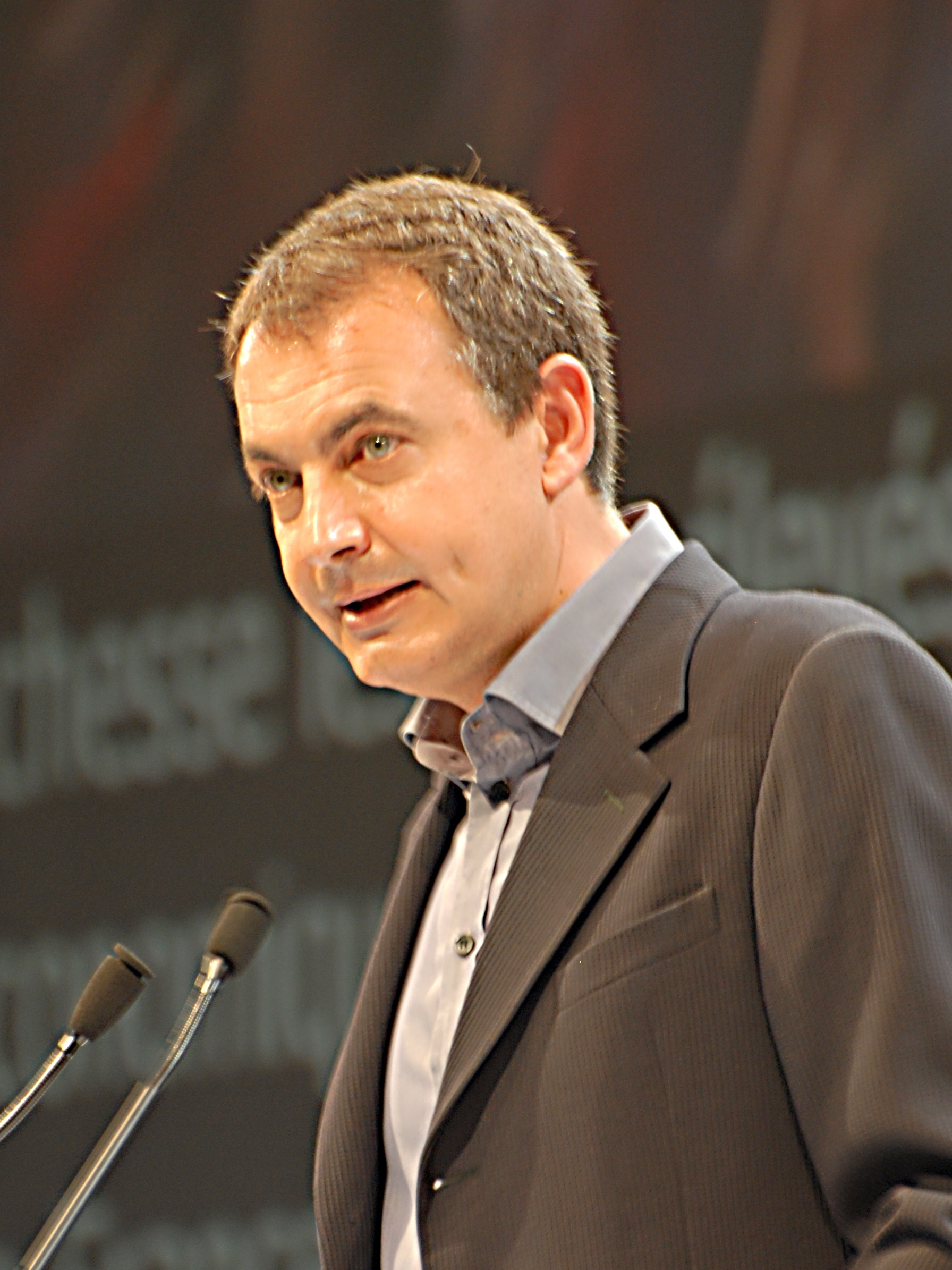
José Luis Rodríguez Zapatero in 2007.

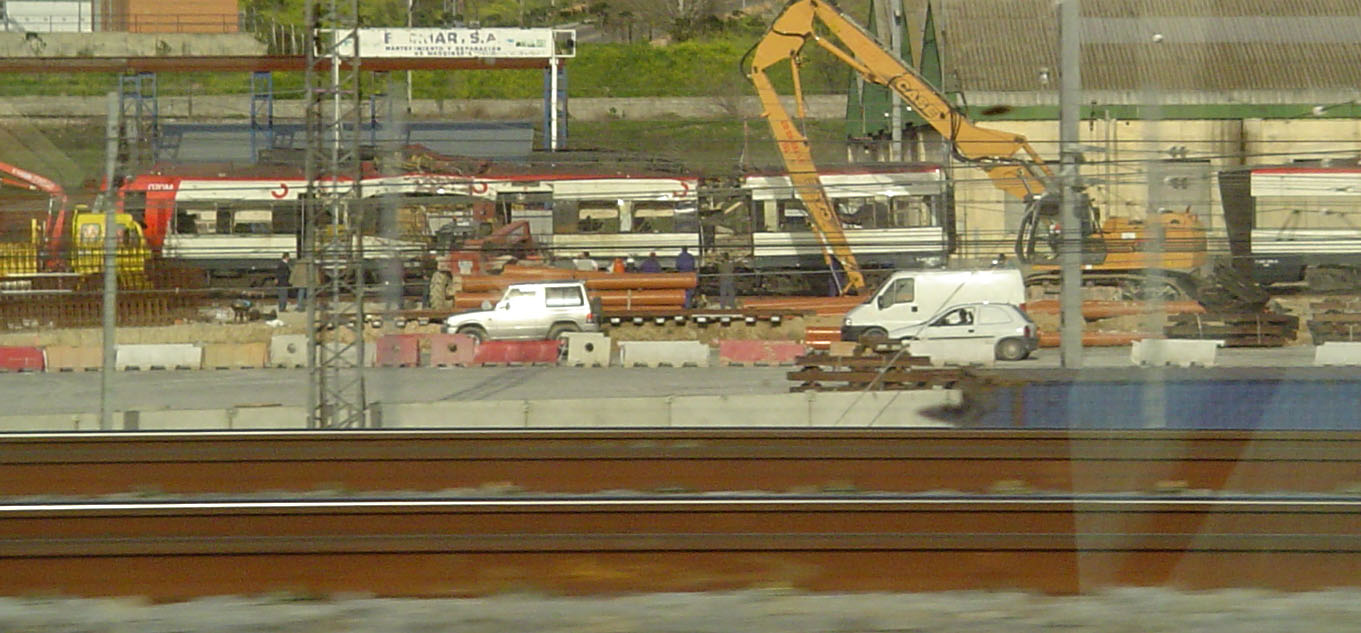
One of the commuter trains where bombs exploded in the March 11, 2004 attack in Madrid.

On Thursday, March 11, 2004, three days before the general elections, ten bombs exploded in four commuter trains in Madrid, killing 191 people and injuring more than 1,500. It was the deadliest terrorist attack in Spanish and European history and caused political parties to suspend their election campaigns. ETA was initially thought to be responsible, a suspicion confirmed a few hours later by Interior Minister Ángel Acebes. However, the police investigation soon pointed to Islamist terrorism linked to al-Qaeda—responsible for the September 11 attacks—although the government maintained that the main hypothesis was still ETA. The confusion over the perpetrators of the attack was evident in the massive anti-terrorism demonstrations that took place the next day-the largest in Spain's history, with an estimated 11 million people taking to the streets on Friday, March 12-where some participants chanted "Who did it?" and "We want the truth," while others shouted "ETA murders." On Saturday, March 13, the day of reflection before the elections, thousands of demonstrators gathered in front of the Partido Popular headquarters in major cities, accusing the government of "hiding the truth" and demanding to "know the truth before voting," as well as chanting "No to the war." At 8 p.m., Minister Acebes announced the arrest of five Moroccans as suspects in the attacks. The theory that ETA was behind the attacks was definitively ruled out four hours later when the minister appeared again, this time to announce the discovery of a video claiming responsibility, in which a man speaking in Arabic with a Moroccan accent declared on behalf of al-Qaeda:

What happened in Madrid... is a response to your collaboration with the criminals of Bush and his allies... [and] to the crimes you have caused in the world, especially in Iraq and Afghanistan, and there will be more, God willing. (Note: In Spanish: "Lo que ha ocurrido en Madrid... es una respuesta a vuestra colaboración con los criminales de Bush y sus aliados... [y] a los crímenes que habéis causado en el mundo y en concreto en Irak y en Afganistán y habrá más si Dios quiere".)

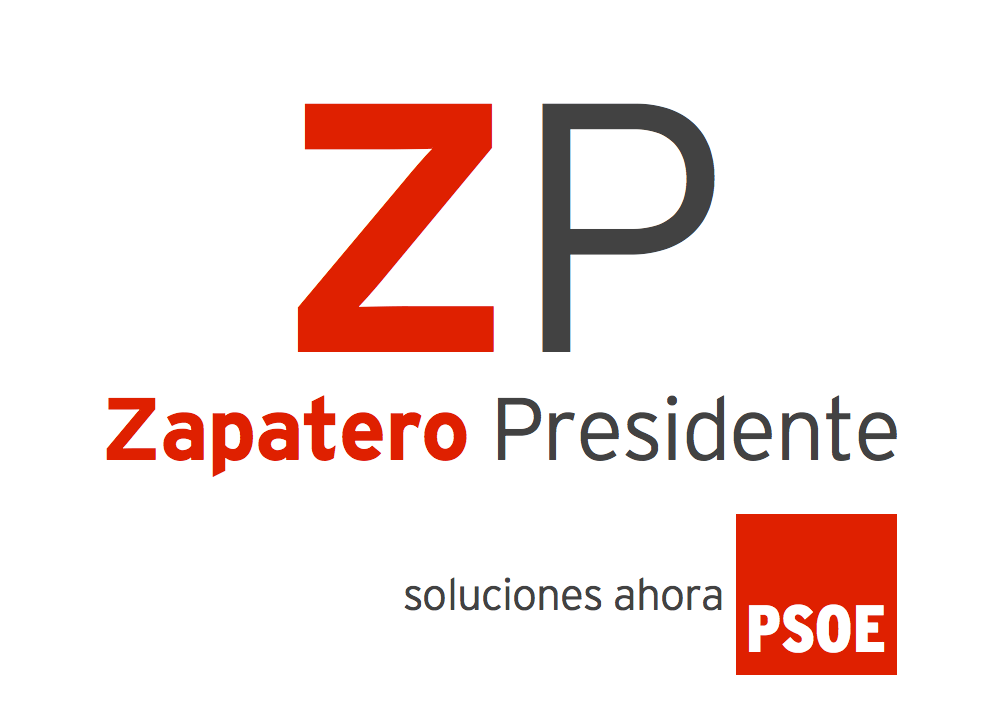
Electoral poster of the PSOE.

The general elections took place on Sunday, March 14, 2004, and by 10 p.m., it was confirmed that the PSOE had won with 164 seats—12 short of an absolute majority—while the PP had 148. A month later, on April 16, the third transfer of power since the restoration of democracy in Spain took place: José Luis Rodríguez Zapatero was sworn in as the new prime minister, the fifth since 1977. In Congress, the deputies of his own party, the PSOE, voted for him, along with those of the Esquerra Republicana de Catalunya, Izquierda Unida-Iniciativa per Catalunya, Coalición Canaria, Bloque Nacionalista Galego and Chunta Aragonesista. CiU, PNV, EA and Nafarroa Bai abstained, while the PP voted against.

== Period of change (2004–2008) ==
=== Change in foreign policy: Withdrawal from Iraq and return to the "old Europe" ===
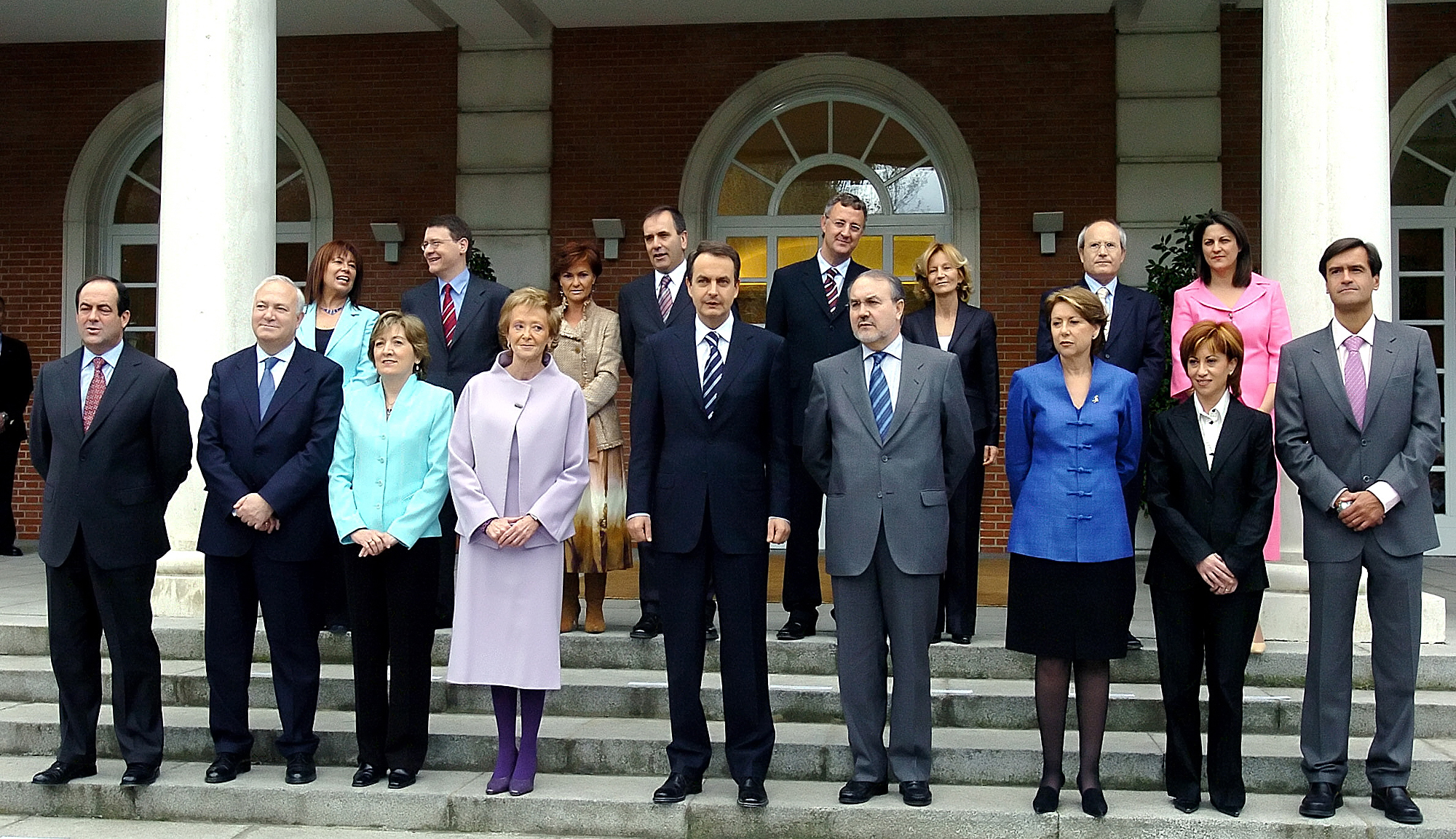
First government of José Luis Rodríguez Zapatero, April 2004.

The first decision of the new Socialist government led by José Luis Rodríguez Zapatero was to order the withdrawal of Spanish troops from Iraq, fulfilling his electoral promise. This decision significantly chilled relations with the United States, coming well before the promised June 30 deadline, and was followed by Rodríguez Zapatero's call for other countries with troops in Iraq to withdraw them as well.

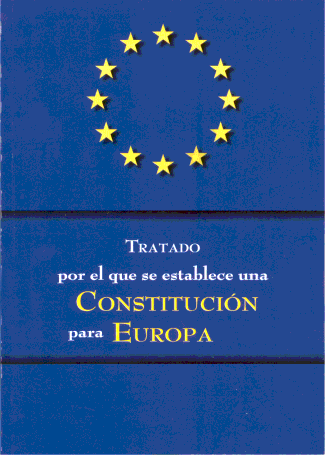
Treaty for the referendum.

The abandonment of the "Atlanticist" policy of the previous government led by Aznar was accompanied by a closer relationship with Germany and France, the two "old Europe" countries that had led the opposition to the invasion of Iraq, which in turn made it possible to unblock the negotiations on the new Treaty establishing a Constitution for Europe. This treaty had been opposed by Aznar and was signed in Rome on October 29, 2004. Zapatero quickly called for a referendum to ratify the treaty, which was held on February 20, 2005. It was approved by 75% of the voters, but the highest abstention rate in Spain's democratic history was recorded.

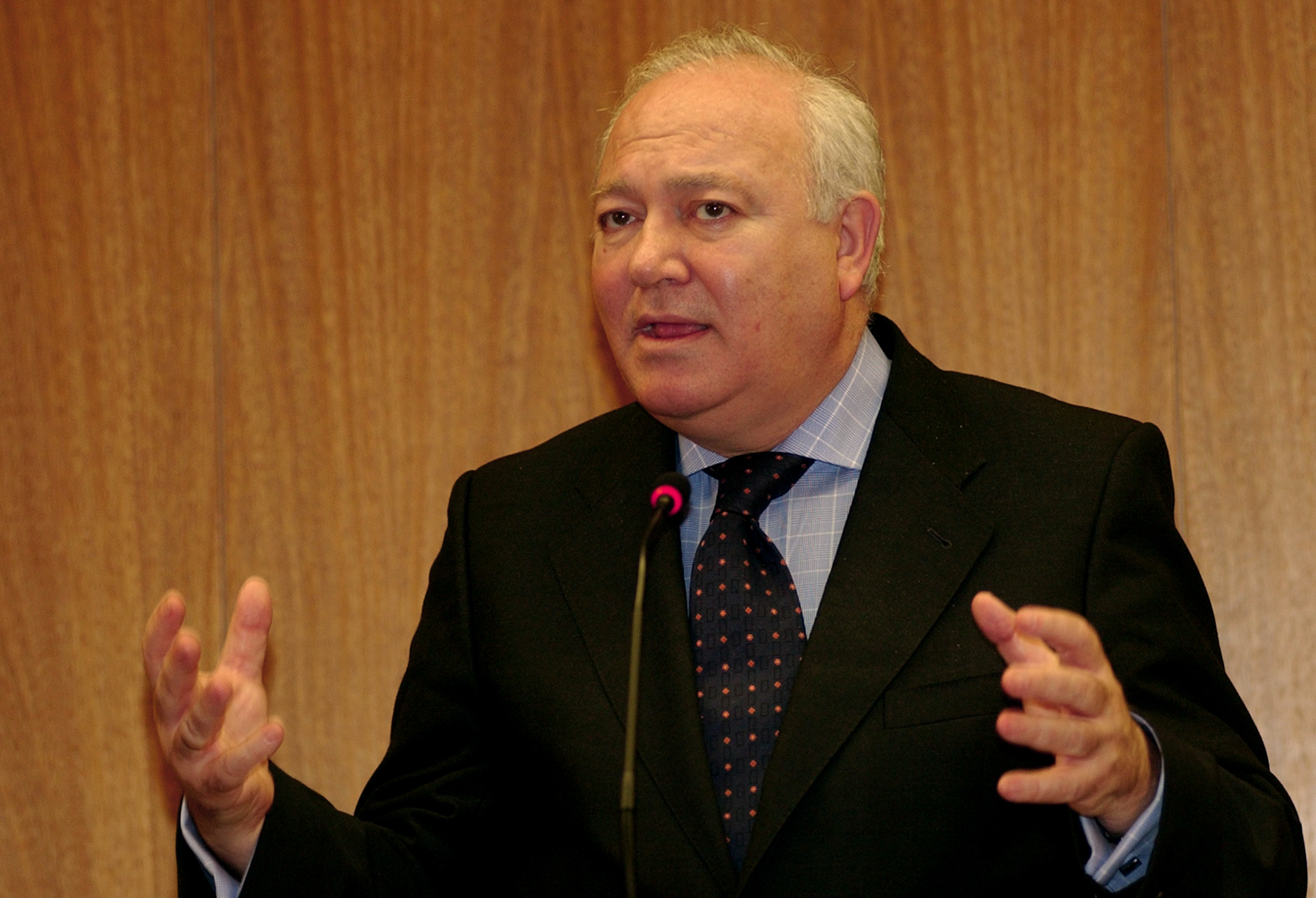
Miguel Ángel Moratinos, Foreign Minister from 2004 to 2010.

However, Rodríguez Zapatero became internationally isolated when the European constitutional project failed—plunging the European Union into the worst institutional crisis in its history—and especially when Germany and France reconciled with the United States after their main allies, German Chancellor Gerhard Schröder and French President Jacques Chirac, were replaced by Angela Merkel and Nicolas Sarkozy, respectively. Moreover, Zapatero's proposal for an Alliance of Civilizations, presented to the United Nations General Assembly in 2004 as an alternative to President Bush's war on terror, received little international support.

=== Opposition of the PP: "11-M" and "Strategy of Tension" ===
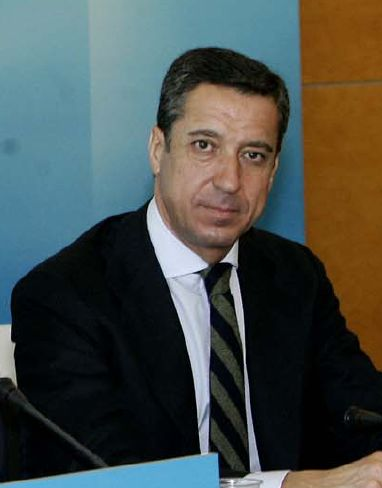
Eduardo Zaplana, parliamentary spokesman for the PP.

The Partido Popular (PP) blamed its electoral defeat on the "manipulation" of public opinion in the two days following the 11-M attacks by the PSOE and its allied media. In doing so, the PP implicitly questioned the legitimacy of the new government and demanded the creation of a parliamentary commission of inquiry to identify the perpetrators of the attack. The PSOE agreed, but expanded the scope of the committee to analyze the events from "11-M" to "14-M". During the committee's meetings, PP spokespersons, led by Eduardo Zaplana, supported the "11-M" version propagated by two media outlets: El Mundo newspaper and COPE radio network. According to this narrative, ETA and the secret services of Morocco and other countries, even Spanish police and agents allied with the PSOE, were involved, supposedly planting false leads in the investigation to blame Islamic terrorism and bring down the PP government.

In October 2007, the National Court ruled that the 11-M perpetrators were the radical Islamists who committed suicide in an apartment in Leganés a month after the attack, when the police had them completely surrounded.

=== "Extension of rights" and mobilization of the Catholic Church ===
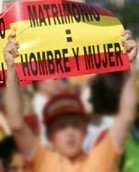
A protester from the Family Forum against the same-sex marriage law.

The Rodríguez Zapatero government introduced a series of legal reforms in Parliament to extend the rights of citizens. Some of these reforms met with significant opposition from conservative sectors, particularly the law recognizing same-sex marriage, the so-called "express divorce" law (which accelerated divorce proceedings), the Equality Law (which established guarantees to ensure the "parity" of women in public and professional life), and the Historical Memory Law (which recognized the victims of the defeated side in the Spanish Civil War, as the Franco dictatorship had already done for the victorious side).

The Spanish Catholic Church hierarchy, with the support of Pope John Paul II, who publicly criticized the Zapatero government for promoting secularism and religious indifference, played a prominent role in opposing these reforms. Various Catholic organizations, such as the Family Forum, organized and led numerous massive demonstrations in "defense of the family" and "religious freedom," with the support of the Partido Popular.

The Catholic bishops—as well as the PP—strongly opposed the LOE education reform proposed by the government, especially the introduction of the new Citizenship Education course in schools. They argued that it was an "attack on the morals" of Catholics and promoted a "radical secularism" that did not "respect the Constitution." The concessions made by the government, such as the modification of the course content and the generous agreement to fund the Catholic Church through income taxes, were not enough to quell the Catholic mobilization led by the bishops and driven by COPE Radio (owned by the Church).

=== Controversy over the New Statute of Autonomy of Catalonia ===
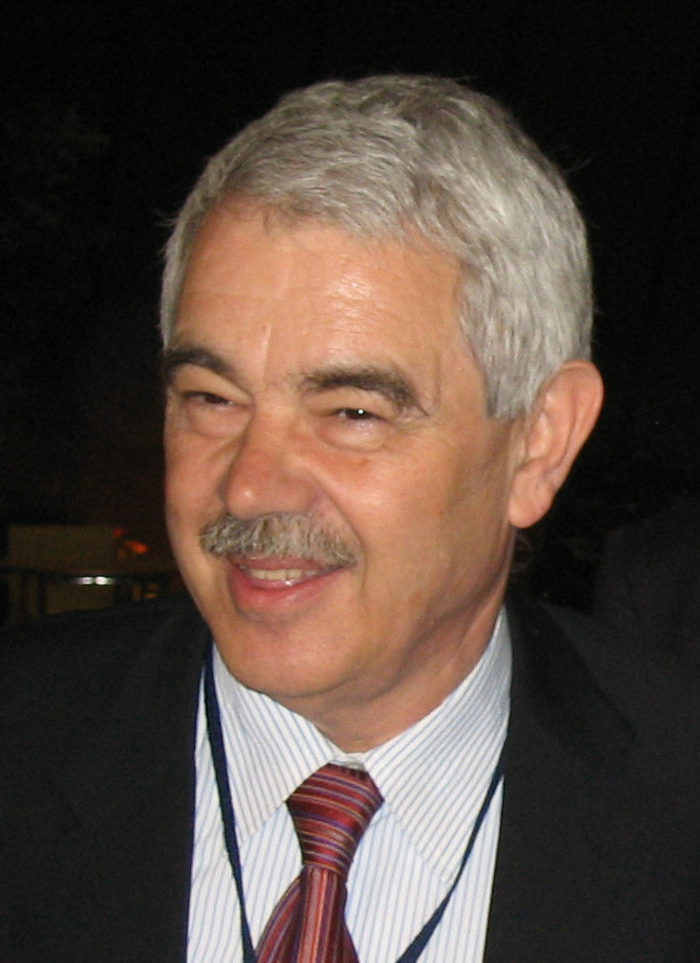
Pasqual Maragall, the socialist president of the Generalitat of Catalonia from 2003 to 2006 and the main proponent of the new statute project.

After months of intense debate, the Catalan Parliament approved the new Statute of Autonomy of Catalonia on September 30, 2005, with 120 votes in favor (from the PSC, ERC, ICV and CiU) and 15 votes against (from the PP). Article 1 of the statute declared that "Catalonia is a nation". It also proposed a new financing system similar to the economic agreements enjoyed by the Basque Country and Navarre, expanded the powers of the Generalitat, which were "shielded" so that the central government could not limit them through "fundamental laws," and proposed a "bilateral" relationship between Spain and Catalonia, implicitly recognizing the sovereignty of the "Catalan people." Criticism of the new Statute soon emerged, mainly from the PP and allied media, as it established a new "federal" or "confederal" model of the State that openly deviated from the 1978 Constitution.

The questionable constitutionality of the Catalan Statute proposal put Rodríguez Zapatero in a difficult position, as he had promised during the election campaign to support the project approved by the Catalan Parliament in the Madrid Cortes. Zapatero's difficulties became evident when voices within his own party, the PSOE, spoke out against the Statute, and criticism of the "Catalanism" and "sovereigntism" of Pasqual Maragall, the president of the Generalitat of Catalonia and the Statute's main proponent, intensified. Meanwhile, the PP, supported and encouraged by the conservative media, held events and demonstrations "in defense of Spain".

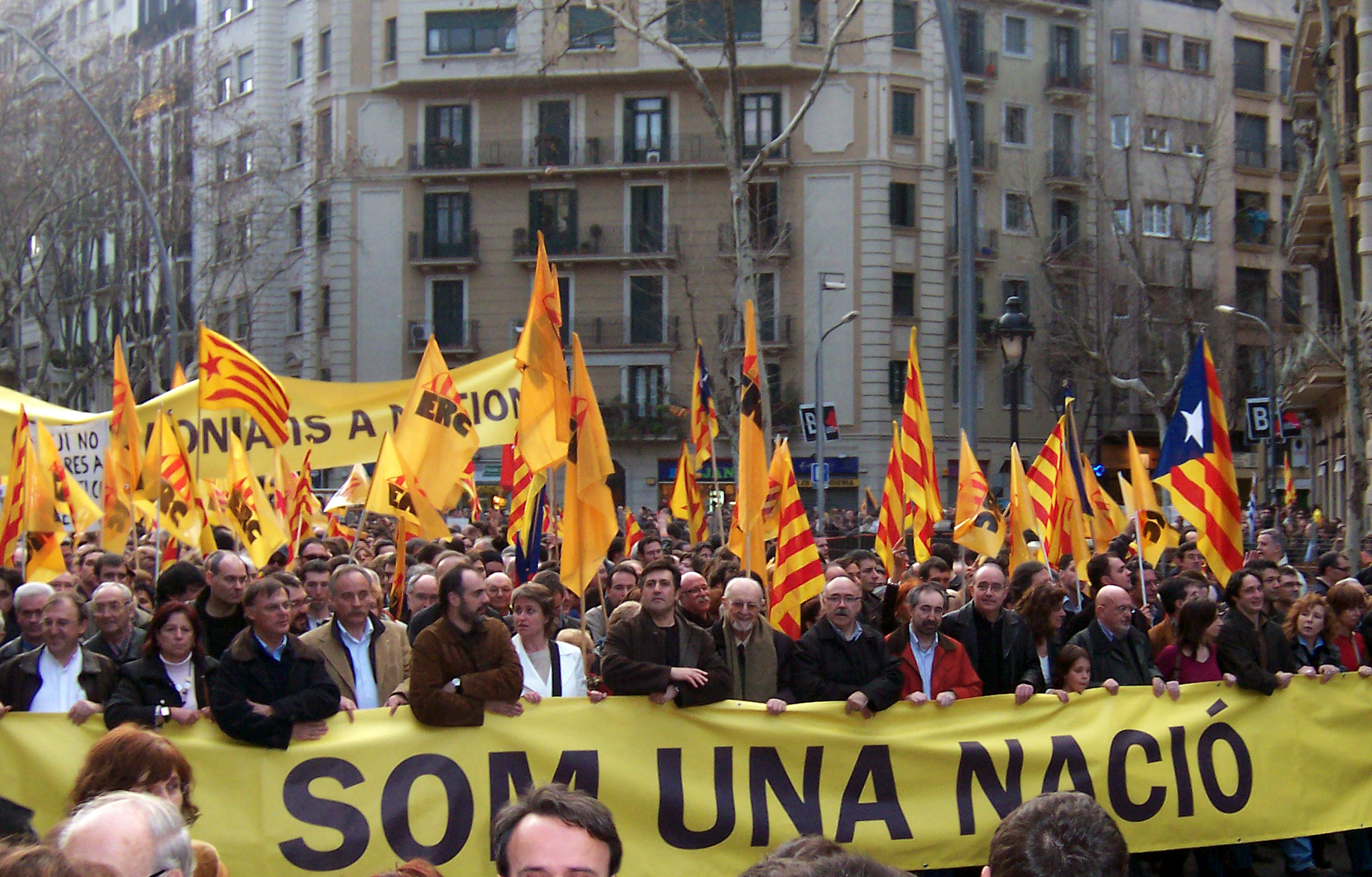
A protest, "Som una nació i tenim el dret de decidir" ("We are a nation and we have the right to decide"), organized in Barcelona on February 18, 2006 by the Platform for the Right to Decide and supported by the Esquerra Republicana de Catalunya (ERC), opposed the changes made by the Congress of Deputies to the Statute of Autonomy project approved by the Catalan Parliament. The demonstration was led by ERC General Secretary Josep Lluís Carod Rovira and other party leaders. This protest is considered the starting point of the Catalan sovereignty process (2012–2022).

Thus began a tough debate in the Cortes Generales to remove the clearly unconstitutional elements from the Catalan Parliament's proposal. However, one of the partners of the tripartite Catalan government, the Esquerra Republicana de Catalunya (ERC), opposed the "cuts". As a result, Rodríguez Zapatero decided to negotiate directly with Artur Mas, a CiU leader and another supporter of the new statute. On January 22, 2006, they reached an agreement: the definition of Catalonia as a nation was relegated to the preamble of the Statute, and the "sovereignty" elements, including autonomous financing and the "bilateral" relationship between Spain and Catalonia, were modified.

The Esquerra Republicana de Catalunya (ERC) rejected the agreement between Zapatero and Mas, leading to the paradox that the ERC, one of the proponents of the Statute, called for a NO vote in the referendum held in Catalonia on June 18, 2006 to approve the new Statute. This led to the dissolution of the tripartite government and the calling of new elections for November 1, 2006. Pasqual Maragall, forced to resign by his party, did not run. The Socialist José Montilla would become the new president of the Generalitat of Catalonia, thanks to a new tripartite agreement, and ERC leader Josep Lluís Carod Rovira was appointed vice-president.

For its part, the Partido Popular, which had also campaigned for a NO vote in the referendum (albeit for reasons diametrically opposed to those of the ERC), filed an appeal with the Constitutional Court.

=== Shift in anti-terrorism policy: "Peace process" ===
Shortly after the rejection by the Congress of Deputies, with the support of the PP, on February 1, 2005, of the Ibarretxe Plan, which proposed the transformation of the Basque Country into a "free state associated" with Spain, Rodríguez Zapatero, without consulting the leader of the PP, Mariano Rajoy, announced his willingness to engage in "dialogue" with ETA to end terrorism, if it demonstrated a clear intention to renounce violence.

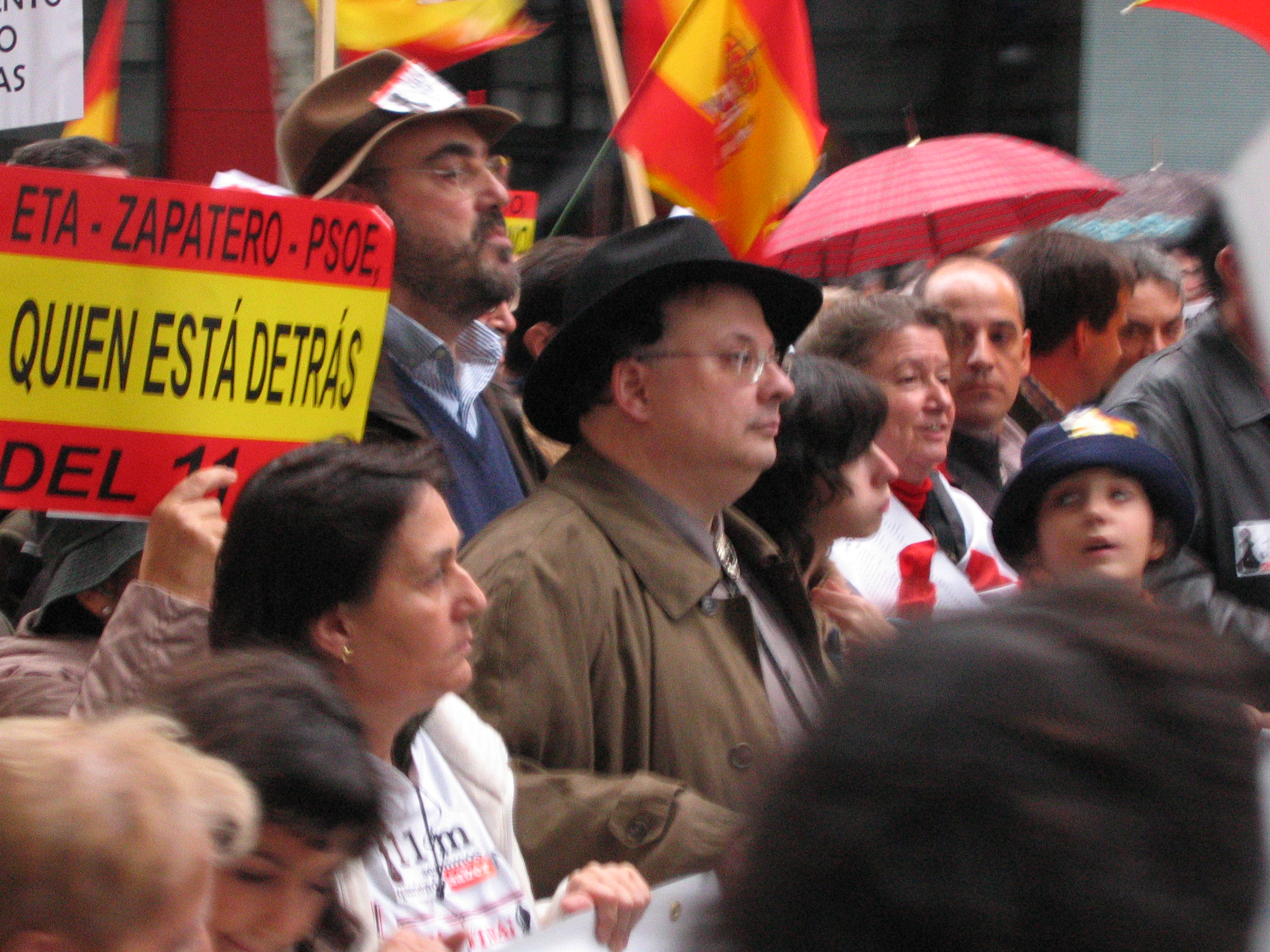
Demonstration in Madrid on November 25, 2006, against the negotiations with ETA, organized by the Association of Victims of Terrorism. COPE journalist César Vidal in the middle.

Almost a year later, on March 22, 2006, ETA announced a "permanent ceasefire" and said it would talk to the government about ending the violence if, in parallel, a "table of parties" was formed, including the illegalized Batasuna, in which the "political" issues of the "conflict" would be discussed. The PP's response was to accuse the government of unilaterally breaking the Anti-Terrorist Pact of 2000, and subsequently to subject it to intense harassment both in the Cortes—where Mariano Rajoy even accused Zapatero of "betraying the dead"—and in the streets, supporting a long series of demonstrations against the "surrender" to ETA called by the Association of Victims of Terrorism, which brought hundreds of thousands of people to Madrid.

However, the mobilization against the "peace process," as its defenders called it, did not prevent government representatives from establishing contacts with ETA's leadership. It soon became clear that the terrorist group was not willing to lay down its arms without achieving its "political" objectives —recognition of the "right to self-determination" of Euskal Herria, which includes Navarre—.To put pressure on the government, ETA intensified its street violence (kale borroka) and finally, on December 30, 2006, detonated a powerful bomb in the T-4 terminal of the Barajas airport, killing two people and causing considerable material damage. The day before the attack, President Rodríguez Zapatero had publicly expressed confidence in the success of the "peace process."

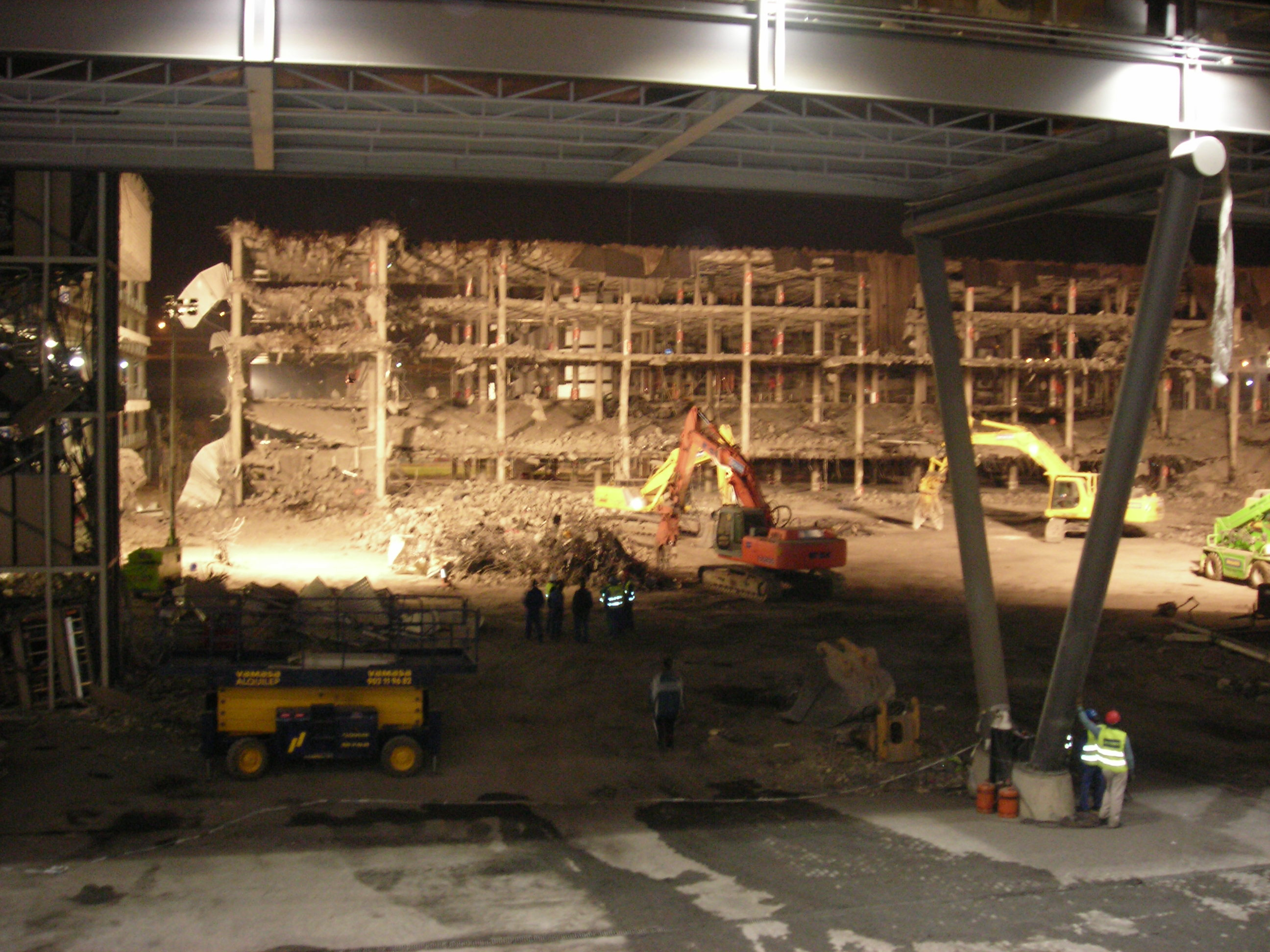
Attack on the T-4 Terminal of Barajas Airport, December 30, 2006.

The government declared the "peace process" "suspended," although it maintained some last-minute contacts with the leadership of ETA and Batasuna in the following months, until ETA announced the end of the ceasefire on June 4, 2007—the first victims of ETA's new wave of terrorism were two civil guards murdered in Capbreton, a village in the French Basque Country, on December 1, 2007—. The government's response was to resume police and judicial pressure against ETA and Batasuna: Batasuna's leadership was arrested and imprisoned, including its main leader, Arnaldo Otegi; ETA member José Ignacio de Juana Chaos lost his reduced prison status and returned to prison; the process of outlawing the Communist Party of the Basque Country—which had managed to run in the Basque regional elections of April 2005, capturing Batasuna's votes—and the Basque Nationalist Action—which had managed to field candidates in half of the Basque and Navarrese municipalities in the municipal and regional elections of May 2007, despite suspicions that Batasuna was behind it. In response, ETA assassinated a former Socialist councilman from the Gipuzkoan city of Mondragón on the eve of the March 2008 elections.

"The peace process, which in some respects was not well designed by the government, has not produced the expected results, but it has created the conditions for the Abertzale Left to decide to distance itself from terrorism. The government's willingness to dialogue and its openness to finding solutions showed Basque society that the main obstacle to ending the violence was ETA's intransigence, not that of the state. ETA broke the ceasefire and launched a new wave of violence, albeit much more limited than that of 2000-2003. The security forces were very effective in dismantling the cells: ETA, severely weakened, had no choice but to follow the peaceful approach of the political wing and withdraw from the scene, putting an end to terrorism".

=== "Economic boom" and its consequences ===
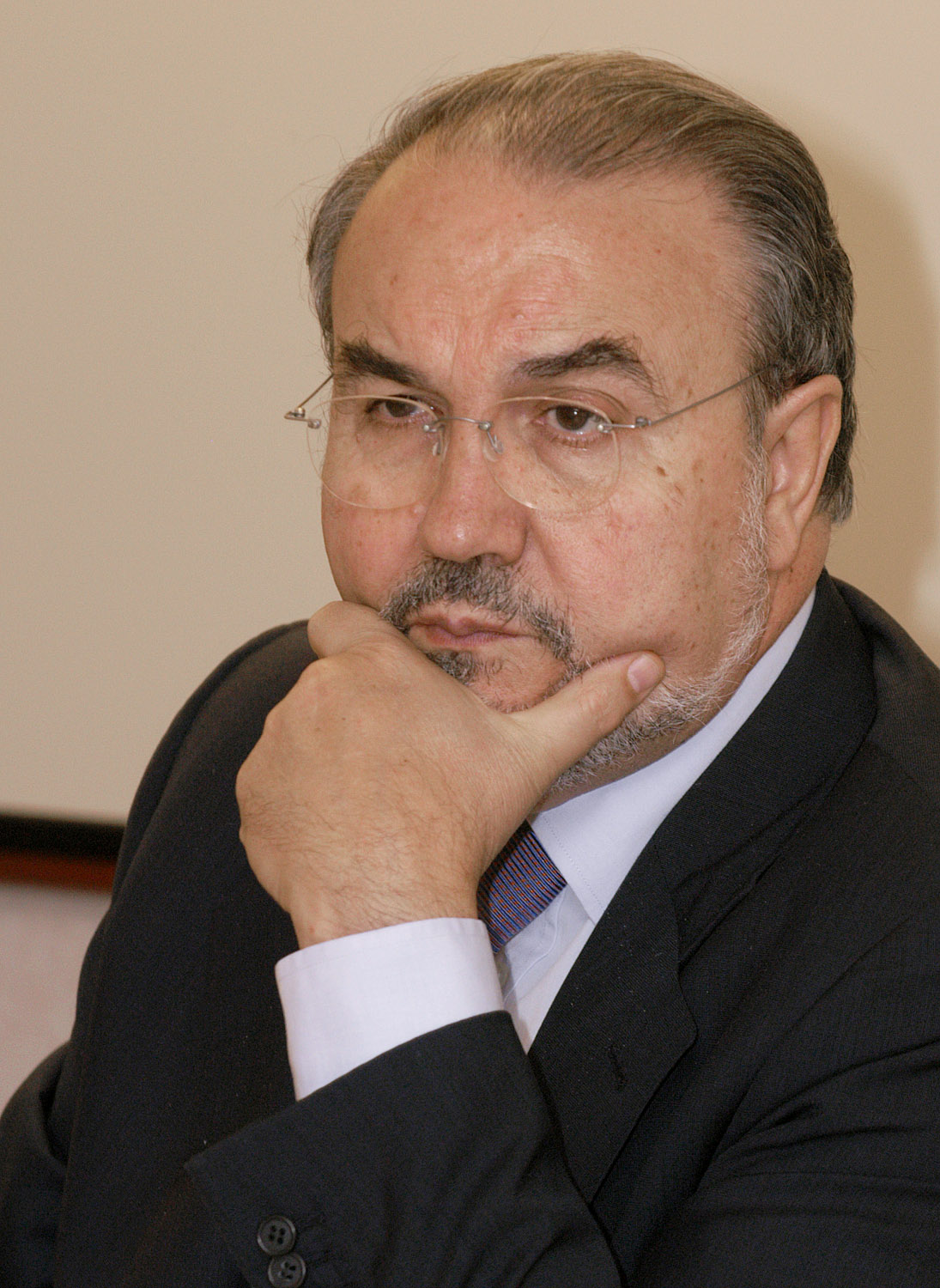
Pedro Solbes, Minister of Economy and Finance from 2004 to 2009.

When the PSOE came to power, it found an economy in full expansion, which had begun in the mid-1990s. The cycle of expansion continued throughout most of its term, with better results in some areas than during the "Aznar era".

The government tried to base growth on increasing productivity, which had stagnated during the Aznar governments, but the National Reform Plan approved in 2005, which increased investment in R&D, did not have the expected effect and productivity improved only slightly. In addition, the government did not carry out the tax reform it had promised during the election campaign.

The spectacular economic growth that began in the mid-1990s was made possible by the presence of hundreds of thousands of immigrants from Latin America, the Maghreb, and Eastern Europe, making Spain the main center of immigration in the European Union. However, most of them were undocumented immigrants, so the government decided to carry out a massive "regularization" in 2005 that affected some 700,000 people who obtained residence permits by presenting a work contract. The PP accused the government of creating a "pull effect" of new immigrants hoping to easily obtain legal status in Spain. After the 2005 regularization, which was also criticized by the European Union for its lack of consultation, the government tightened its immigration policy to prevent new "illegals" from entering the country. Integrating the four million immigrants who had arrived in Spain in the previous 10 years—with foreigners now accounting for nearly 10 percent of the population—was a major challenge for Spanish society. However, there were no serious racist or xenophobic incidents, making Spain an exception in the European context.

=== Amnesty for Illegal immigration ===
In 2005, During the Premiership of José Luis Rodríguez Zapatero, Spain gave residency to more than 576,000 undocumented migrants in a Amnesty.

=== End of the "real estate bubble" and the beginning of the "slowdown" (2007–2008) ===
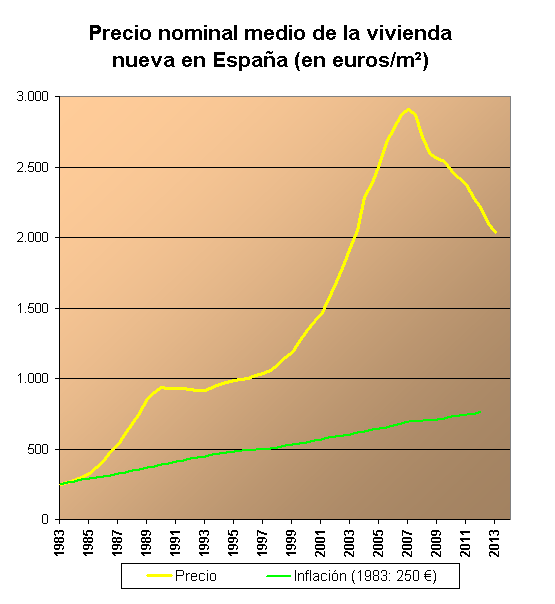
New house price trends in Spain, according to the Property Valuation Society.

The main "engine" of economic growth during the boom years was the construction sector, whose growth was boosted by the expansionary monetary policy of the European Central Bank and by decisions taken by the Aznar governments, such as the Land Law of 1998 and tax deduction for home purchases. The Zapatero government continued these policies, maintaining the tax deductions on housing and only reforming the Land Law in 2007.

The housing boom—which peaked in 2006 with the launch of nearly 800,000 new homes—was driven by demand, but much of it resulted from speculative investments in "bricks," as people bought homes not to live in them but to invest their savings, hoping to sell later at a higher price. This fueled the "Spanish housing bubble".

However, in the summer of 2007, the outbreak of the subprime mortgage crisis in the United States immediately affected Europe, and Spain in particular. Housing prices stopped rising, the construction sector ground to a halt, and this dragged down the broader economy, which began to grow at a slower pace, with a consequent rise in unemployment—which had reached historic lows in June 2007, with the unemployment rate falling below 8%—. The "slowdown", as the government called the onset of the crisis, was initially accompanied by rising inflation due to the escalation of oil prices, certain raw materials and food costs. Thus, from the fall of 2007, the political debate shifted to the economy, which became the centerpiece of the general election campaign in March 2008. Rodríguez Zapatero promised full employment in the next term, a "political irresponsibility" given that "there was already a certain consensus that the international economic situation would face difficulties, and therefore many expected that the employment outlook would not be as promising as in previous years.

== Crisis legislature (2008–2011) ==
=== General elections of March 2008 ===
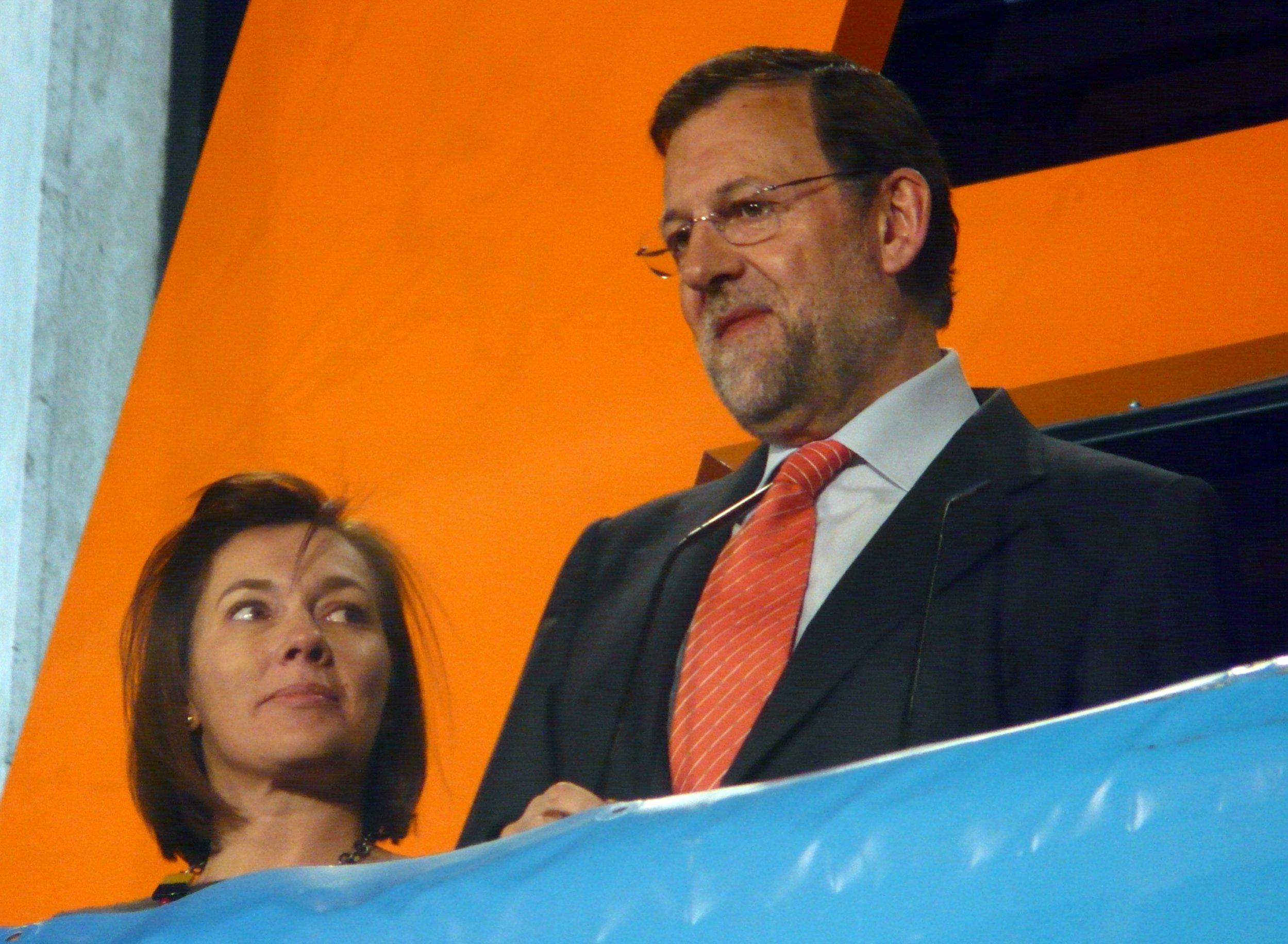
Mariano Rajoy with his wife on the balcony of the PP headquarters in Génova street in Madrid on the night of the elections on March 9, 2008.

The PSOE repeated its 2004 victory in the March 2008 general elections, obtaining more than 11 million votes and gaining 5 seats more than in 2004 (169 in total), although it did not obtain an absolute majority. According to political scientist Ignacio Sánchez-Cuenca, the PSOE gained almost two percentage points more than in 2004 thanks to "a significant activation of the left-wing vote".

The PP, for its part, grew in votes—more than 10 million—and seats (158), but failed to achieve its goal of ousting Rodríguez Zapatero from power, leading to a challenge to Mariano Rajoy's leadership and an internal crisis that was only resolved at the party's June congress in Valencia, where Rajoy was re-elected to lead a renewed PP. Similar crises affected the other two losers in the elections: Izquierda Unida (which ended up with only two seats) and Esquerra Republicana de Catalunya (which dropped from 8 to 3 seats).

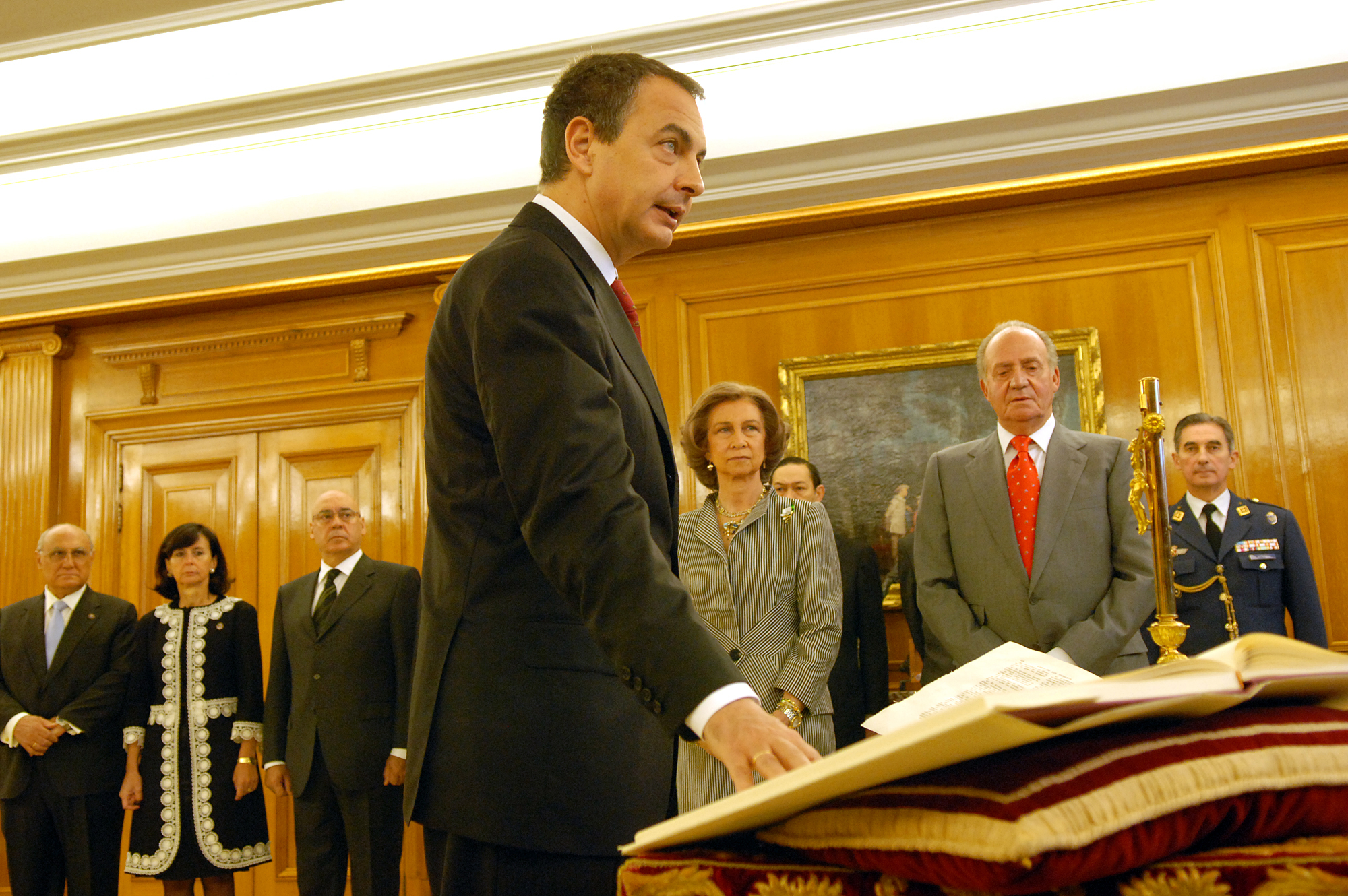
Zapatero being sworn in as President of the Government in front of King Juan Carlos I in April 2008.

This time, Rodríguez Zapatero chose not to negotiate for support to secure his investiture as President of the Government, and was thus elected on April 11, 2008, with only the votes of his party, the only time this has happened in Spanish democracy. The PP voted against him, as did the three deputies of the ERC, his former ally, and the deputy of the new Union, Progress and Democracy party, Rosa Díez—an ex-Socialist leader who left the PSOE because of her total disagreement with Rodríguez Zapatero's territorial and anti-terrorist policies. CiU (10 deputies), PNV (6), Coalición Canaria (2), BNG (2) and Nafarroa Bai (1) abstained.

=== Economic crisis ===
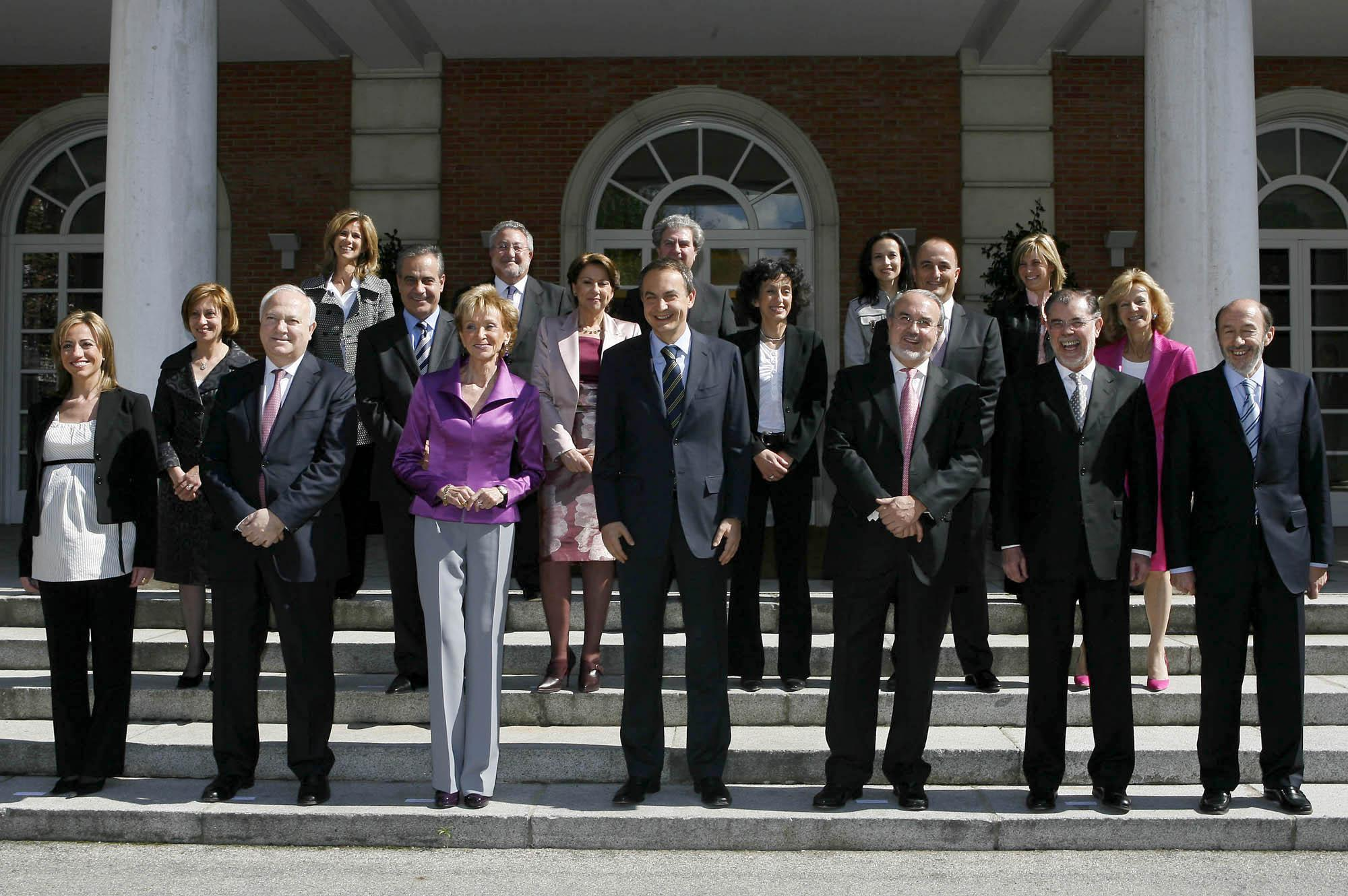
Second government of José Luis Rodríguez Zapatero, April 2008.

After the elections, the economic outlook did not improve; on the contrary, it worsened significantly from September onwards due to the effects of the international crisis triggered by the collapse of the American investment bank Lehman Brothers. Instead of moving toward "full employment," as Rodríguez Zapatero had promised during the campaign, the Spanish economy fell into recession and unemployment skyrocketed, first in the construction sector—the Spanish housing bubble also burst—and then in other sectors. As Ignacio Sánchez-Cuena pointed out, "Zapatero and his government were swallowed up by the crisis. The first and hardest hit by unemployment were the diaspora, who often lacked social and family networks that could act as "buffers".

Initially, the president avoided using the term "crisis," referring instead to a "slowdown in growth," which led to "a rupture between Zapatero and public opinion, which had previously been generally supportive of his government. This rupture deepened with the numerous optimistic economic forecasts made by Zapatero, which were repeatedly contradicted by stubborn facts that pointed to a deeper crisis than the government was willing to admit."

The government responded to the crisis with typical Keynesian demand stimulus measures, most notably the Spanish Economic Stimulus Plan, known as "Plan E," approved at the end of 2008. However, GDP fell by 3.7% in 2009 and the unemployment rate exceeded 20% of the labor force, although some experts estimate that without the government's stimulus package, GDP would have fallen even more.

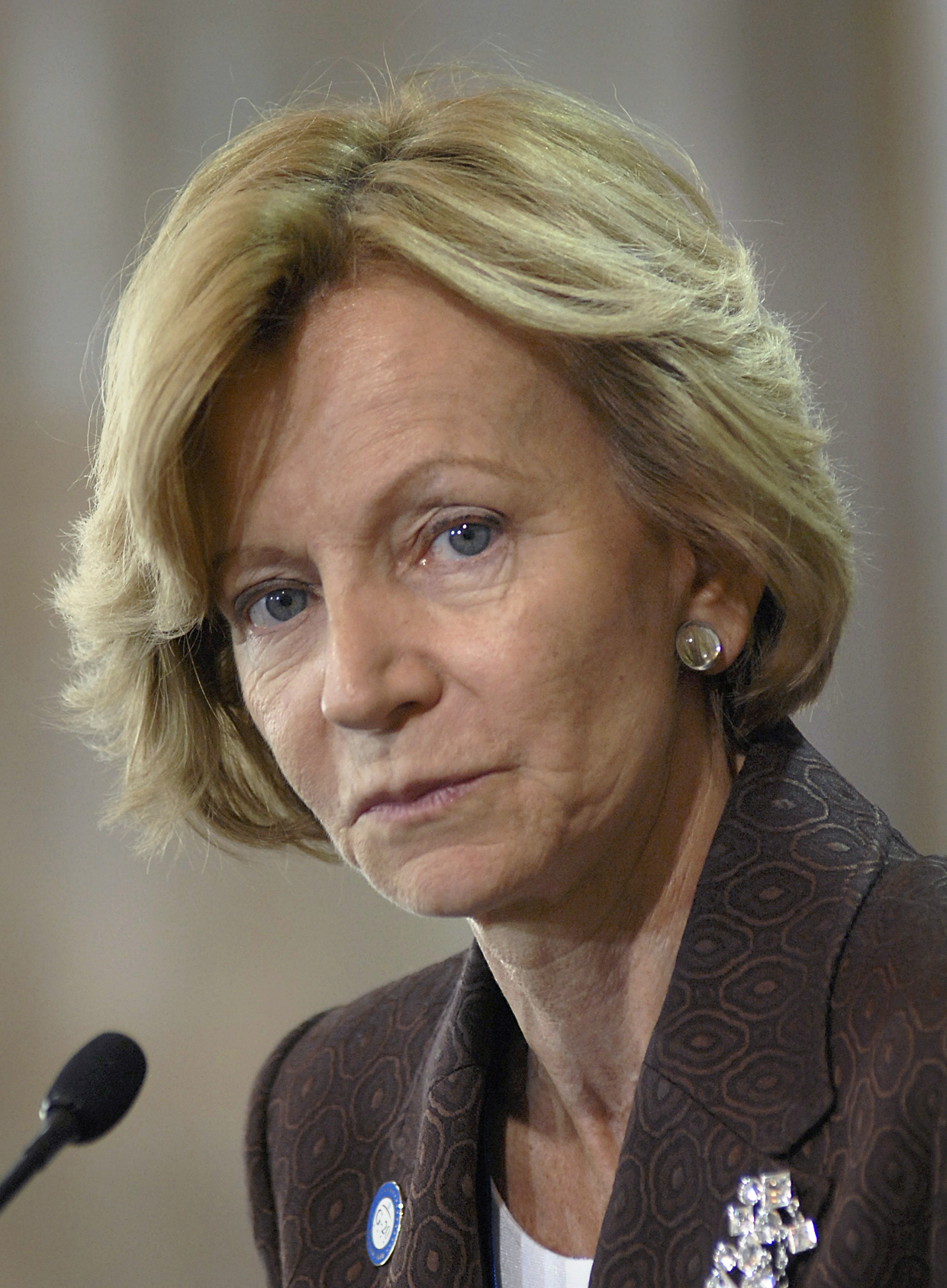
Elena Salgado, the new Minister of Economy and Finance since April 2009, replacing Pedro Solbes.

As a result of increased spending to stimulate demand and falling revenues due to the recession, the public deficit soared, approaching 10% of GDP. Economy and Finance Minister Pedro Solbes then defended the need for adjustment measures to restore public finances, but President Rodríguez Zapatero disagreed, leading to Solbes' departure from the government in the April 7, 2009 cabinet reshuffle, with Elena Salgado taking his place. By this time, unemployment had passed the four million mark.

Zapatero also initially resisted the introduction of labor market "flexibility" measures demanded by business leaders and certain liberal groups. Instead, he proposed the Sustainable Economy Law, which was approved by the Council of Ministers in November 2009. This "omnibus law" addressed a variety of issues aimed at creating a "growth model that balances economic, social and environmental development in a productive and competitive economy that promotes quality employment, equal opportunities and social cohesion, while ensuring respect for the environment and the rational use of natural resources." However, the bill had little public impact, except for the section known as the "Sinde Law," which established the digital tax, and its legislative process was extremely slow, not passing until March 4, 2011.

A month before Solbes' resignation, the Bank of Spain intervened in Caja Castilla-La Mancha, which was technically bankrupt, exposing the fragility of the financial system, especially the savings banks, and contradicting the government's claims of their strength and health. During the boom years, the savings banks had been the main financiers of construction companies and their clients, so when the Spanish real estate bubble burst in 2007-2008, they found that many of the loans they had made would not be repaid, creating a huge hole in their finances. Faced with difficulties, they could no longer turn to external markets as they had done before due to the international crisis, which led them to restrict credit, which had a recessionary effect on economic activity, thereby exacerbating the crisis.

The savings banks most exposed to real estate were on the verge of bankruptcy, so the Bank of Spain promoted the merger of the most troubled ones with healthier ones to "clean" their balance sheets and "bank" them, privatizing their assets so they were no longer public entities. Thus, the number of savings banks fell from 45 before the crisis to 15 in 2010, but the state had to provide public funds through the FROB to organize some of them and make the mergers possible. The most significant merger was between CajaMadrid and Valencia's Bancaja, which created Bankia, the country's third largest financial institution.

=== Turn to "austerity" (May 2010) ===
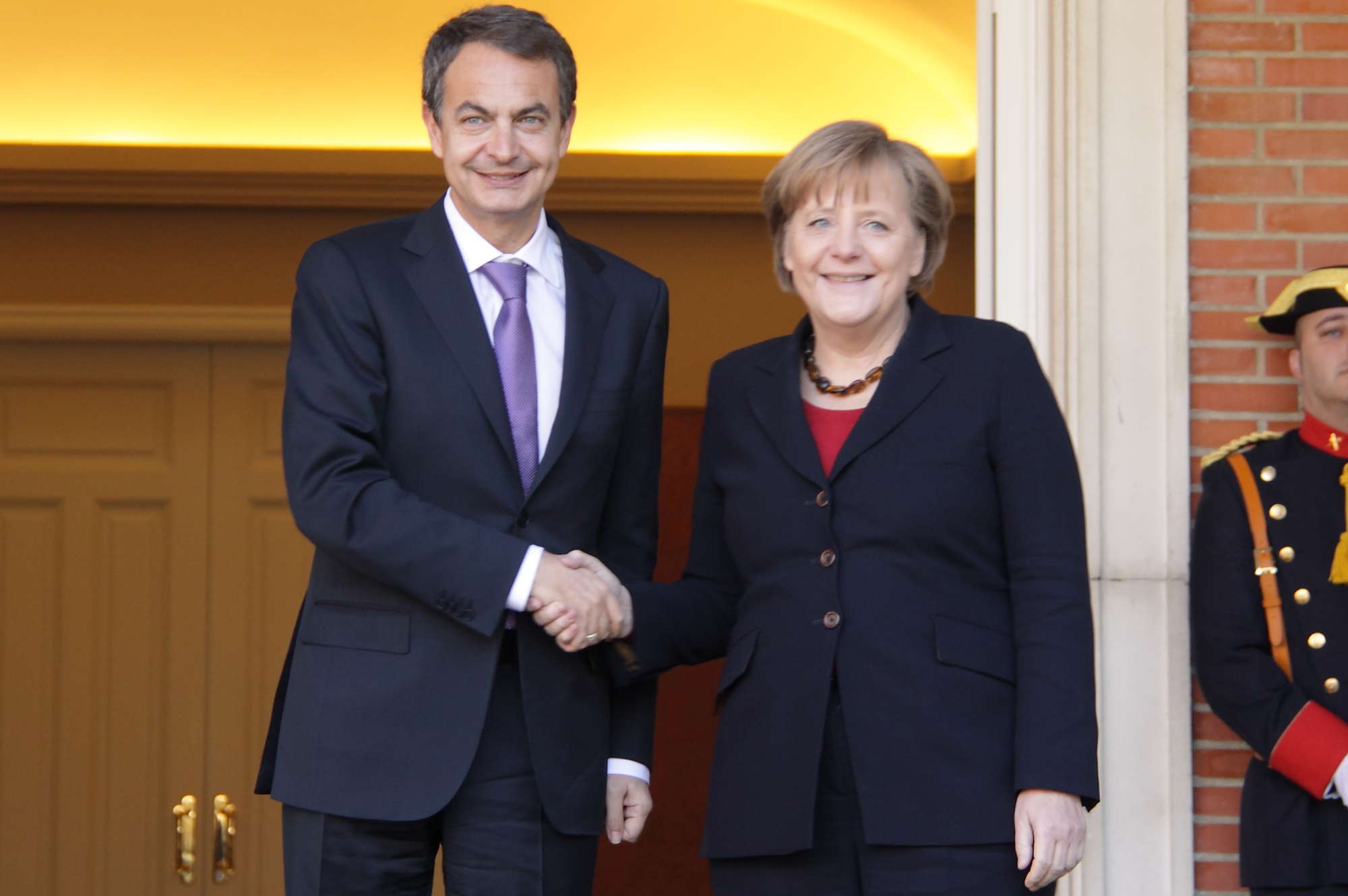
President Rodríguez Zapatero and German Chancellor Angela Merkel, the main proponents of imposing "austerity" policies on Ireland and southern countries (La Moncloa Palace, February 2011).

In early 2010, the difficult economic situation was exacerbated by the outbreak of the European sovereign debt crisis following the announcement of Greece's debt crisis. Soon, the debt of other eurozone countries with significant external deficits like Greece—notably Ireland and southern countries, including Spain—began to be "attacked" in the financial markets, leading to a rise in the "risk premium" over the German bond, the benchmark instrument, even though Spain's public debt represented only 20% of total debt —with healthy accounts until 2007—while the remaining 80% was held by households and companies. Creditor countries in the eurozone, led by Germany and supported by the European Central Bank, the European Commission and the International Monetary Fund, imposed cuts in public spending to reduce the budget deficit caused by the fall in revenues due to the recession and the stimulus packages to combat it.

In Spain, the public deficit had risen to 11.2% of GDP in 2009, mainly due to a 20.5% decline in revenues between 2007 and 2010—mainly due to a decline in corporate tax revenues—which caused the risk premium on Spanish debt to rise to around 200 basis points over German bonds. The European institutions issued an ultimatum to the Spanish government to reduce the budget deficit at the European Council meeting on May 9, 2010. Three days later, on May 12, President Rodríguez Zapatero announced to Congress a drastic cut in public spending of 15 billion euros. The "adjustment," aimed at reducing the public deficit to 3% by 2014, included an average 5% cut in public workers' salaries, a freeze on pensions (except for non-contributory pensions), the elimination of the baby bonus, a 6 billion euro cut in public investment, and a reduction in benefits under the Law on Dependency. This marked a turn in the economic policy of the socialist government, which believed-or was forced to believe by rising risk premiums—that austerity and "structural adjustment" were the only way out of the crisis. The immediate effect of the new "adjustment" policy—also called "fiscal consolidation"—was to stifle the nascent recovery, leading to economic stagnation and ultimately a new recession at the end of 2011, with rising unemployment. Although Zapatero avoided a bailout, unlike Greece, Ireland and Portugal, the change in economic policy direction "would have a significant impact on the image of Zapatero's government, which was already damaged by its erratic handling of the economic crisis and is now severely damaged".

The adjustment policy was accompanied by the reform of the savings banks—which were the most indebted credit institutions as a result of the bursting of the "real estate bubble"—and the introduction of three major "structural reforms" related to the labor market, pensions, and collective bargaining, following the guidelines of the European institutions, which considered them essential to emerge from the crisis. The government approved the labor market reform in September 2010 to make it more "flexible," while trying to avoid lowering dismissal costs, which did not satisfy either unions or employers. Among other measures, it extended fair dismissal, with compensation of 20 days per year worked, to cases where companies face "current or anticipated" losses, and set a maximum duration for project-based contracts to prevent them from being used as open-ended contracts without the associated rights. With regard to pensions, the new law approved in June 2011 raised the retirement age from 65 to 67 and extended the calculation period for pensions from 15 to 25 years, while also increasing the contribution period required for the maximum pension from 35 to 38 and a half years. Finally, in the absence of an agreement between unions and employers, the government approved a royal decree in June 2011 that "flexibilized" the collective bargaining system.

The new economic policy was widely criticized by trade unions and other left-wing sectors, particularly because it focused on spending cuts while leaving revenues untouched—direct taxes remained unchanged, only the general VAT rate was raised from 16% to 18%—. In response, the CC OO and UGT unions called a general strike for September 29, 2010, the first since Zapatero took office. Although the strike received uneven support, it marked the end of the good relations that the two main unions had previously had with the government.

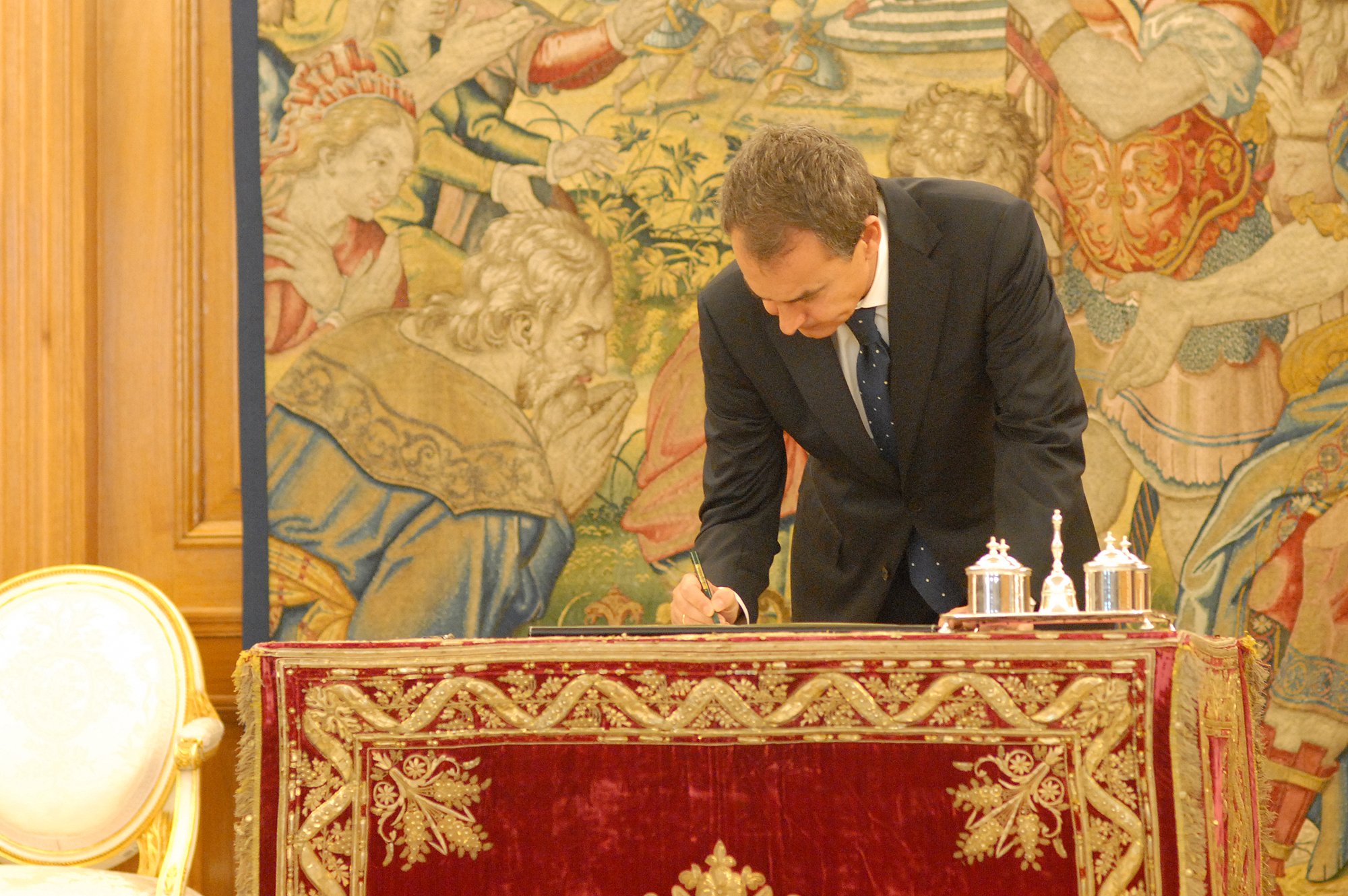
President Rodríguez Zapatero signs the reform of Article 135 of the Constitution.

However, the "adjustment" policies and "structural reforms" undertaken by the government failed to ease the pressure on public debt, as the risk premium continued to rise. By the summer of 2011, the situation had become untenable, prompting the European Central Bank to intervene by purchasing Spanish and Italian sovereign debt—whose risk premiums had also soared, as had those of Greece, Portugal and Ireland, which had been forced to seek "European bailouts". In return, the ECB, backed by Germany, demanded new "structural reforms" from both Italy and Spain. In response, the Rodríguez Zapatero government, with the immediate support of the People's Party, quickly reformed Article 135 of the 1978 Constitution to require the State and the Autonomous Communities "not to incur a structural deficit that exceeds the margins established, where applicable, by the European Union for its Member States." According to Ignacio Sánchez-Cuenca, this hasty constitutional reform, without the necessary public debate, "was Zapatero's most questionable decision during his presidency.

The general perception of the Rodríguez Zapatero government's economic management during the "crisis legislature" was that it had failed, although it had avoided a bailout. This perception was crucial to the People's Party's overwhelming victory in the November 2011 general elections.

=== Political crisis ===
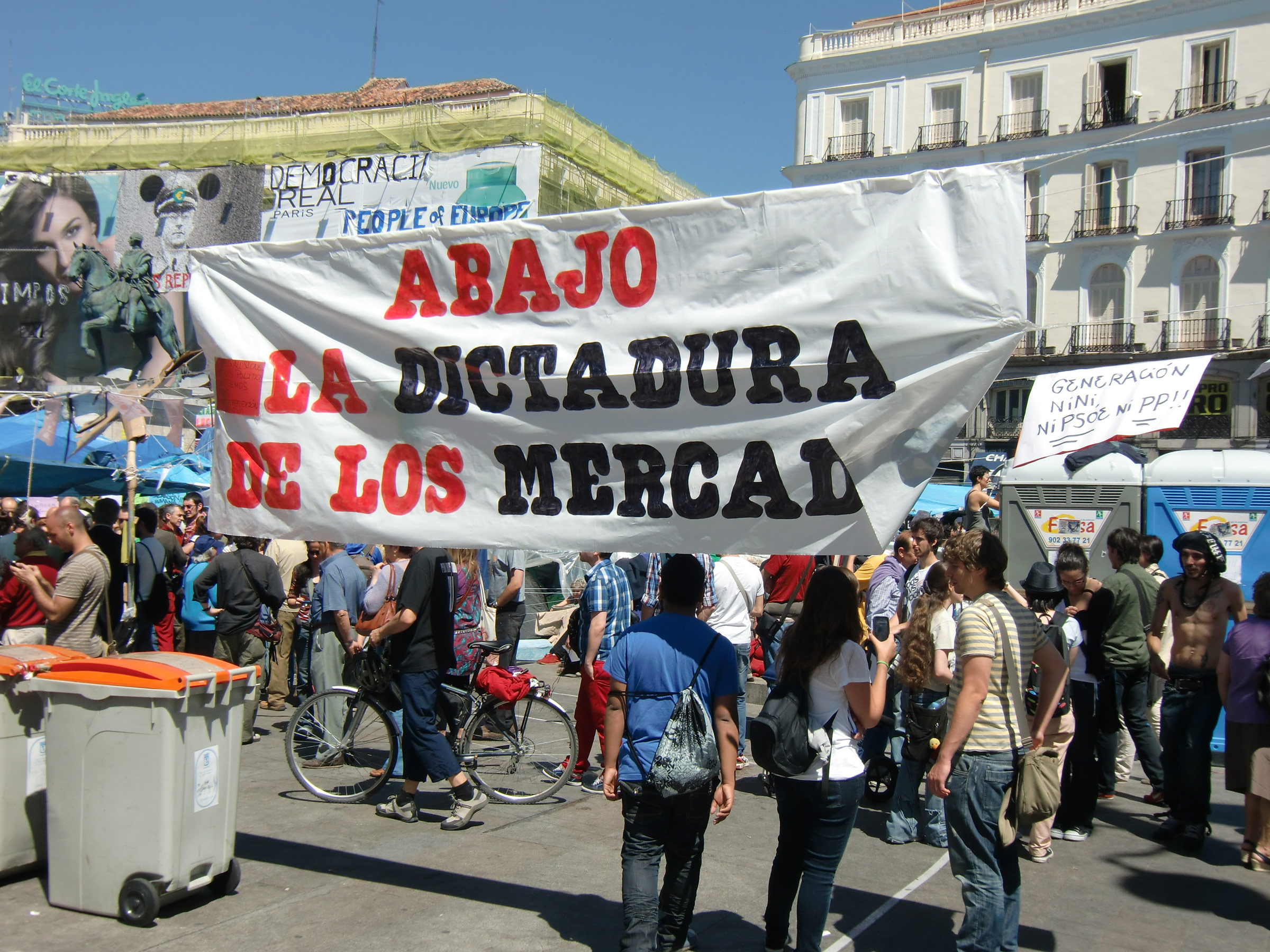
Banner of the 15-M movement camp in Madrid's Puerta del Sol (May-June 2011).

The deep economic crisis turned into a political crisis, as the lack of confidence in the government's ability to deal with it spread to the entire "political class" and the system as a whole. As Ignacio Sánchez-Cuenca noted, "when the unemployment rate skyrockets and so many people have no job prospects, discouragement and frustration are directed at politicians. [...]The same goes for the impoverishment of large sectors of the population, evictions, energy poverty, child malnutrition and other social problems that have arisen during the crisis: all of these are powerful reasons for citizens to feel deeply disappointed in politics". In addition, there was a widespread sense that the crisis had disproportionately affected the most vulnerable and that the distribution of sacrifices was therefore unfair, as well as the perception that governments were powerless against financial powers and supranational institutions such as the IMF, the ECB and the European Commission, which are not subject to any democratic control.

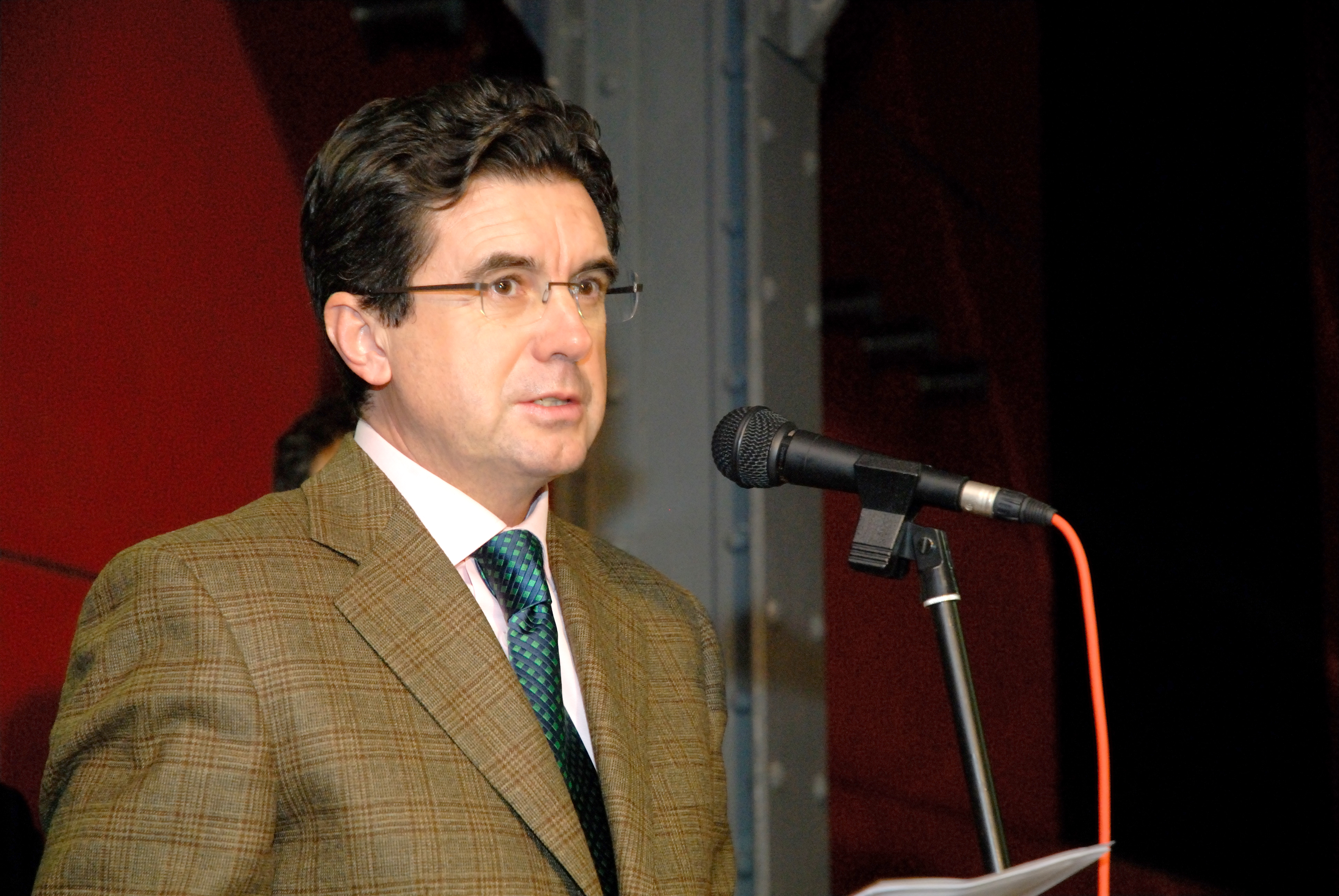
Jaume Matas, president of the Balearic government from 2003 to 2007 for the People's Party, was accused of several crimes following the Palma Arena case.

Another factor explaining the political crisis was the corruption scandals involving numerous politicians. In 2009, the Gürtel affair emerged, affecting the People's Party, especially in the Valencian Community—Generalitat Valenciana President Francisco Camps had to resign in July 2011, just three months after winning the regional elections again, although he was later acquitted by a popular jury—and the Community of Madrid. A year earlier, the investigation of the Palma Arena case had begun, involving the Balearic PP and implicating the former president of the Balearic Islands, Jaume Matas. This affair eventually led to the indictment of the king's son-in-law, Iñaki Urdangarín, in 2011, which had an enormous media impact and severely damaged the image of the monarchy—its approval rating fell from 5.54 in 2008 to 4.89 in 2011, according to the CIS barometer. The PSOE was also hit by scandals, the most notable being the ERE case in Andalusia, which was investigated in March 2011.

The government's approval rating, as well as that of the president and the PSOE, fell in the polls. What García de Cortázar and González Vesga have called the PSOE's "special way of the cross" began in March 2009 with the elections to the Galician and Basque parliaments. Although in the Basque Country the socialist Patxi López became lehendakari—thanks to the support of PP deputies—, in Galicia the People's Party, led by Alberto Núñez Feijoo, won an absolute majority, ousting the PSG-BNG coalition that had governed Galicia since 2005. The decline of the Socialists and the rise of the People's Party were confirmed in the 2009 European Parliament elections, in which the PP defeated the PSOE for the first time since 2004 in a general election.

The decline of the Socialist government's approval rating to historically low levels accelerated after the economic policy change in May 2010. In the following four months alone, Socialist voting intentions fell by four points. The first confirmation of this collapse came in the Catalan elections of November 2010, in which the Catalan Socialist Party lost nine seats and the tripartite government that had governed Catalonia since 2003 was ousted by the CiU with the support of the People's Party—the Convergence candidate, Artur Mas, replaced the Socialist José Montilla as president of Catalonia.

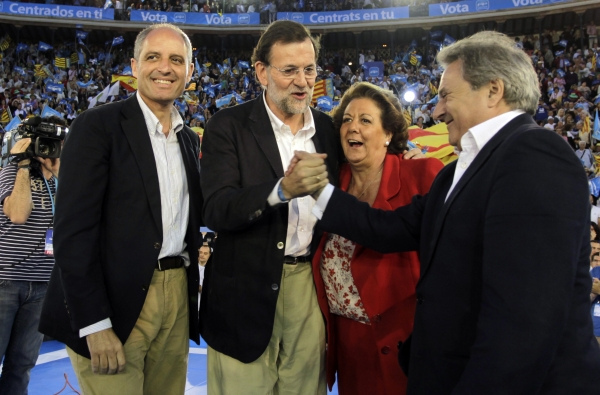
Mariano Rajoy at a rally in Valencia's Plaza de Toros, accompanied by Francisco Camps, Rita Barberá and Alfonso Rus.

From then on, PSOE leaders began pressuring Rodríguez Zapatero to announce whether he would run in the next general election. On April 2, 2011, a month and a half before the municipal and regional elections, Zapatero announced that he would not be the party's candidate in the upcoming elections. However, Zapatero's withdrawal did not prevent the socialist collapse, as the PSOE fell 10 points behind the People's Party. The PP took control of the government in 34 provincial capitals, while the PSOE retained only nine, as well as the cities of Vigo and Hospitalet de Llobregat among cities with more than 250,000 inhabitants. Of the 13 contested autonomous communities, only Asturias, Navarre and the Canary Islands escaped People's Party control, and of these only Asturias was governed by the PSOE. Perhaps the PP's most significant victory was in Castilla-La Mancha, an autonomous community that had been governed by the PSOE since its creation and was now to be led by the PP's general secretary, María Dolores de Cospedal. Another emblematic government won by the PP was in Extremadura, this time thanks to the abstention of the Izquierda Unida, which refused to support the Socialist candidate.

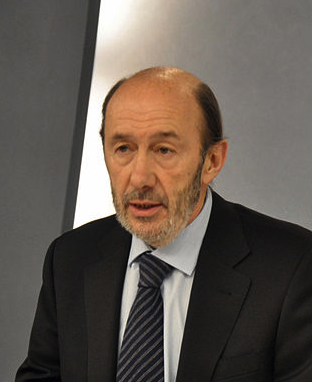
Alfredo Pérez Rubalcaba, Minister of the Interior, Vice President and government spokesman until July 12, 2011, when he was selected by the PSOE as its presidential candidate.

Following the municipal and regional elections, the PSOE began the primary process to allow party members to choose their presidential candidate for the upcoming general elections. Vice President Alfredo Pérez Rubalcaba and Defense Minister Carme Chacón both ran, but Chacón withdrew when "a dark and disturbing operation" was launched to suspend the primaries and recognize Rubalcaba as the candidate. However, "in light of the [disastrous] results of November 20, it seems that Rubalcaba's leadership failed to mitigate the traumatic and unqualified defeat that occurred that day."Sánchez-Cuenca 2012, p. 101

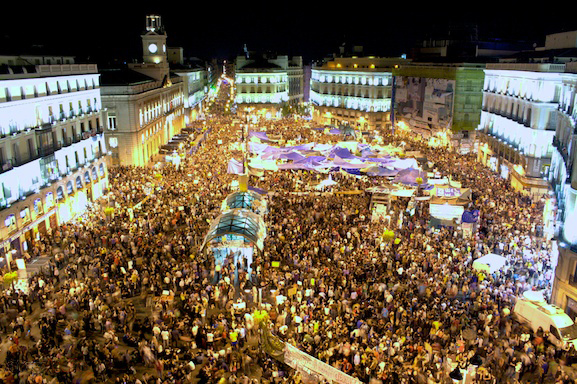
Puerta del Sol, May 20, 2011.

On the Sunday before the municipal and regional elections, May 15, 2011, demonstrations of "indignados," mostly young people, were held in major Spanish cities, organized by the "Real Democracy NOW!" platform. The next day, a group of them decided to camp out in Madrid's Puerta del Sol, taking inspiration from Cairo's Tahrir Square, where Egypt's "Arab Spring" began. The police eviction only increased the number of campers, who eventually occupied the entire square, attracting extensive national and international media coverage, and soon similar camps appeared in many cities, such as Barcelona's Plaza de Cataluña. They remained there for several weeks.

One of the most repeated slogans in the meetings held by the campers was "They don't represent us," referring to the major political parties, which "powerfully conveyed the frustration of many citizens with the country's political and economic elites. This gave rise to what became known as the 15-M movement, which sought, among other things, to end the privileges of the "powerful" that were particularly onerous in the context of the crisis. It was, in short, "an expression of pent-up anger and a profound critique of representative democracy through political parties.

=== "Territorial Question": challenge of Catalan Independence and End of ETA ===
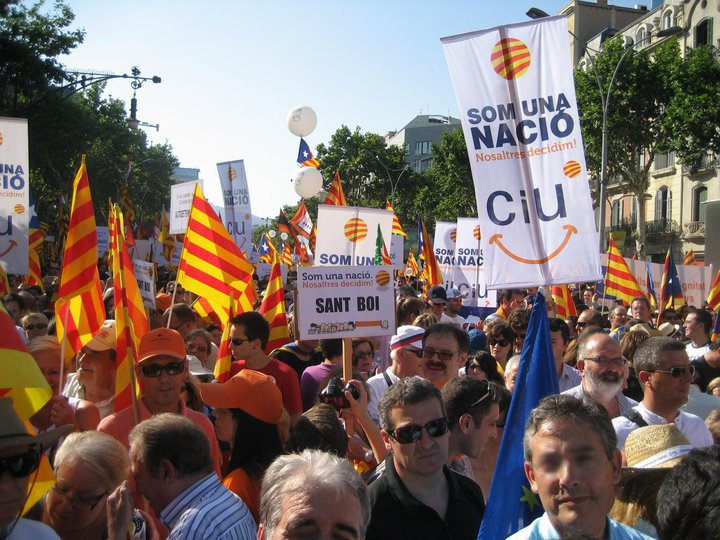
A demonstration with the slogan "Som una nació. Nosaltres decidim" ("We are a nation. We decide") was held in Barcelona on July 9, 2010, in response to the Constitutional Court's ruling on the 2006 Statute of Autonomy of Catalonia.

Another key aspect of the political crisis was the significant rise of Catalan independence, especially after the Constitutional Court's ruling in June 2010 on the 2006 Statute of Autonomy of Catalonia. After four years of deliberation, the ruling dealt a blow to Catalan nationalist aspirations on sensitive issues such as "national" identity, language, administration of justice, and the ability to establish a separate tax system. On July 9, 2010, a large protest was held in Barcelona to reject the ruling under the slogan "Som una nació, nosaltres decidim". All Catalan parties except the People's Party and Ciutadans took part, and the event turned into a plebiscite for independence. During the demonstration, the president of Catalonia, Socialist José Montilla, was forced to leave under heavy security due to pressure from radical pro-independence groups. Four months later, regional elections were held and won by CiU, whose leader, Artur Mas, became the new president of Catalonia.

In the Basque Country, the parliament narrowly approved a proposal by the Lehendakari, Juan José Ibarretxe, to hold a referendum on the "right to decide" for the "Basque people," but it was annulled by the Constitutional Court. In response, the Basque Government organized a demonstration in Bilbao on the day of the referendum, October 25, 2008, under the slogan "Yes to Euskal Herria. Yes to peace. Yes to decision". The following year, regional elections were held in which no parties of the abertzale left could participate, and the Euskadi Socialist Party (PSE-PSOE) formed a government with the support of the People's Party. For the first time since the return to democracy, the PNV was ousted and a non-nationalist Basque politician, the socialist Patxi López, became president.

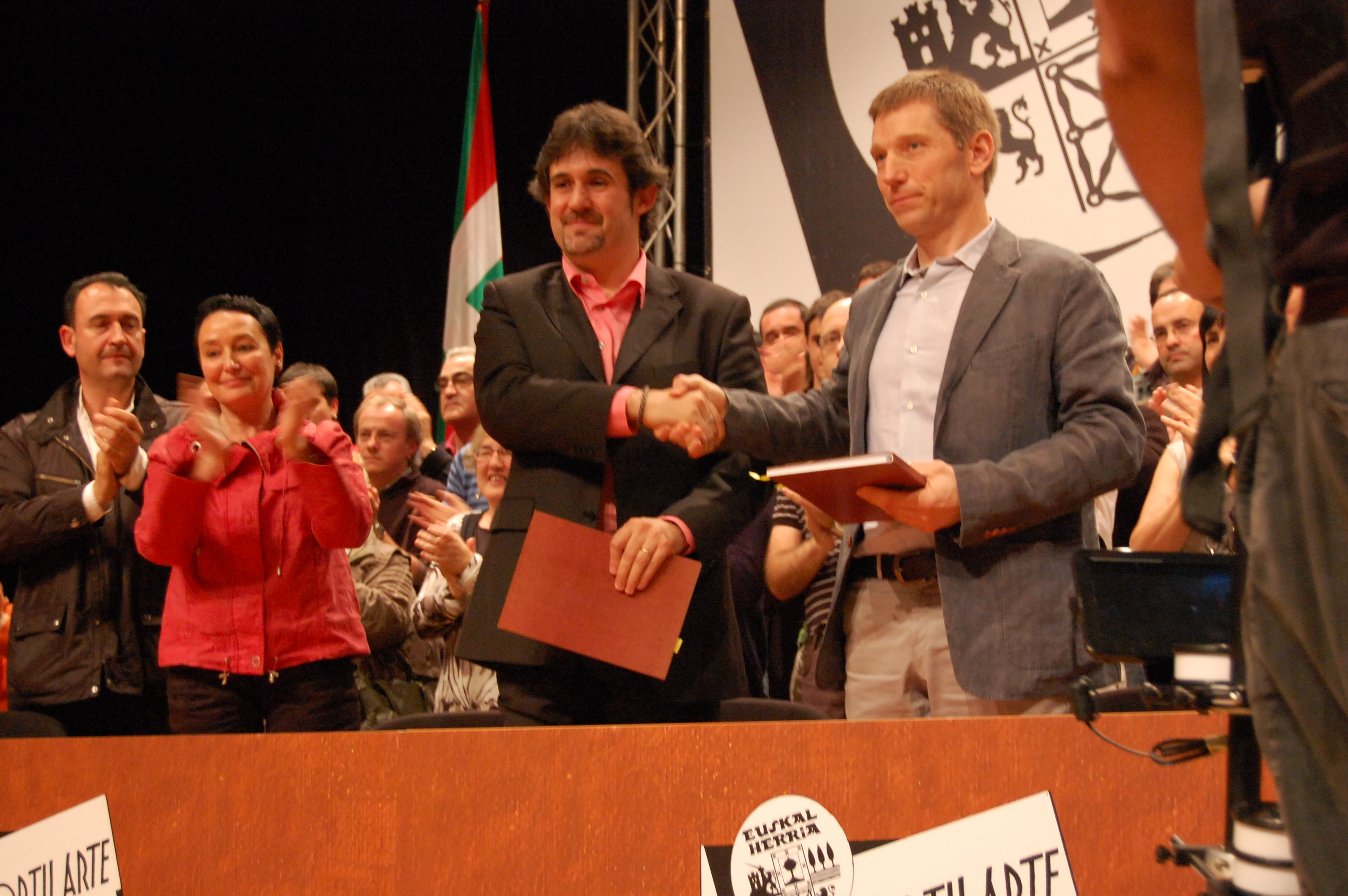
Rufi Etxeberria, representing the abertzale left, and Pello Urizar of Eusko Alkartasuna shake hands after the signing of the strategic agreement between Eusko Alkartasuna and the abertzale left in June 2010, the first step in the formation of the Bildu coalition.

The change of government in the Basque Country, the exclusion of Batasuna-affiliated groups from institutions, and the effective operations of the state security forces against ETA—which resulted in the arrest of the entire leadership that had imposed a cease-fire in 2007 in less than two years—among other factors, led the abertzale left to rethink its political strategy. Thus, in February 2010, Batasuna presented a first document advocating a "democratic process without violence", which was followed by the "Brussels Declaration". In this declaration, an international mediation group led by South African lawyer Brian Currin called on ETA to declare a permanent ceasefire.

After a first unsuccessful attempt with Sortu, the abertzale left won Constitutional Court approval for the Bildu coalition, which included other political groups, allowing it to participate in the May 2011 municipal and regional elections, where it achieved notable success. Bildu members took the mayoralty of San Sebastián and the Foral Council of Guipúzcoa.

On October 20, one month before the general elections in Spain, in which the abertzale left was running as part of the Amaiur coalition, ETA announced the definitive end of its "armed struggle," opening up a new political landscape in the Basque Country. According to Ignacio Sánchez-Cuenca, the end of terrorism represents "one of Zapatero's greatest achievements," achieved through the "peace process" initiated in the previous term, which, despite ETA's violation of the ceasefire, created the conditions for the abertzale left to opt for peaceful means, isolating ETA and ultimately leading to the permanent cessation of violence. In this sense, Sánchez-Cuenca claims that "the government put an end to ETA terrorism. However, Fernando García de Cortázar and José Manuel González Vesga warn that "the management of ETA's end...remains very open due to the change of government in Madrid, the lack of an explicit declaration of dissolution from the group, and the legal and emotional complexities of finding a satisfactory solution for the prisoners and the integration of abertzaleism into political life."

=== November 2011 elections ===
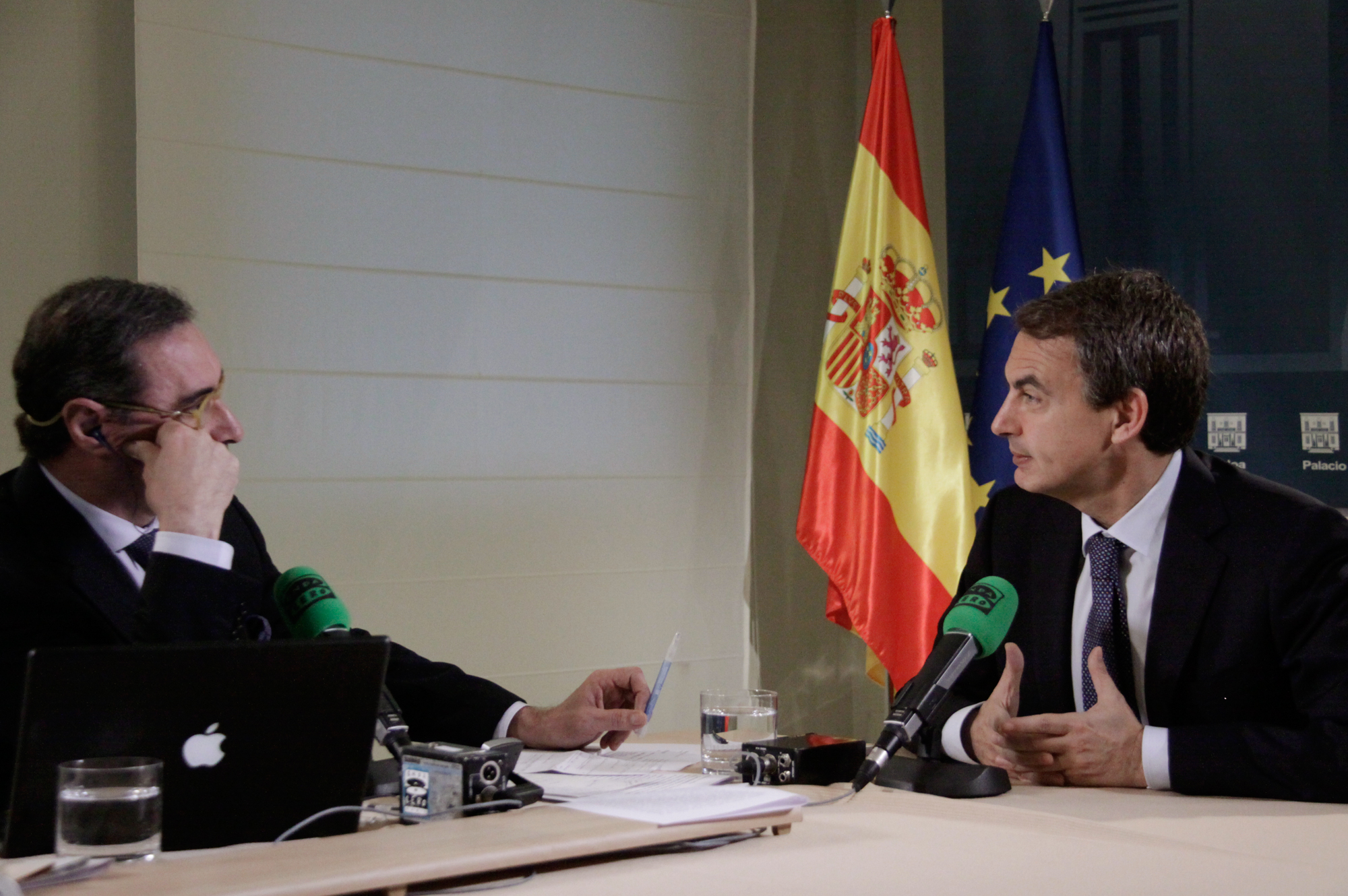
José Luis Rodríguez Zapatero interviewed by Carlos Herrera in June 2011.

Faced with a loss of support for his government, President Rodríguez Zapatero decided on November 20, 2011 to call early general elections, originally scheduled for March 2012. The result was a landslide victory for the People's Party, which secured an absolute majority—186 seats, three more than the PP's previous absolute majority in the 2000 elections—while the PSOE suffered its worst result since the reign of King Juan Carlos I, winning only 110 seats and losing 59 from the 2008 elections. The PSOE "fell victim to the conservative wave that swept through former Socialist strongholds and the mass exodus of left-wing voters, many of whom abstained or pinned their hopes on the IU," led by Cayo Lara, which won 11 seats. Surprises in the election results included Rosa Díez's UPyD, which won five seats; the Basque coalition Amaiur, formed by Eusko Alkartasuna, Aralar, Alternatiba and the abertzale left, also present in Bildu, which won six seats on a platform of self-determination for the Basque Country; and CiU, which increased its seats from 10 to 16, overtaking the PSC as the most voted party in Catalonia.

The Socialists, the losers of the election, held the PSOE's 38th Congress in Seville in early February 2012, where Alfredo Pérez Rubalcaba was narrowly elected as the new general secretary, winning by just 22 votes over his rival, Carme Chacón, out of a total of 956 delegates.

== See also ==
- First government of José Luis Rodríguez Zapatero
- Second government of José Luis Rodríguez Zapatero

== Bibliography ==
- García de Cortázar, Fernando; González Vesga, José Manuel (2012). Breve historia de España (in Spanish) (6th ed.). Madrid: Alianza Editorial. ISBN 978-84-206-7374-5.
- Sánchez-Cuenca, Ignacio (2012). Años de cambios, años de crisis. Ocho años de gobiernos socialistas, 2004-2011 (in Spanish). Madrid: Los Libros de la Catarata-Fundación Alternativas. ISBN 978-84-8319-682-3.
- Sánchez-Cuenca, Ignacio (2014). La impotencia democrática. Sobre la crisis política de España (in Spanish). Madrid: Los Libros de la Catarata. ISBN 978-84-8319-881-0.

| Preceded by Governments of José María Aznar | Governments of Rodríguez Zapatero | Succeeded by Governments of Mariano Rajoy |
