= Ignacio Sánchez-Cuenca =

Spanish social scientist

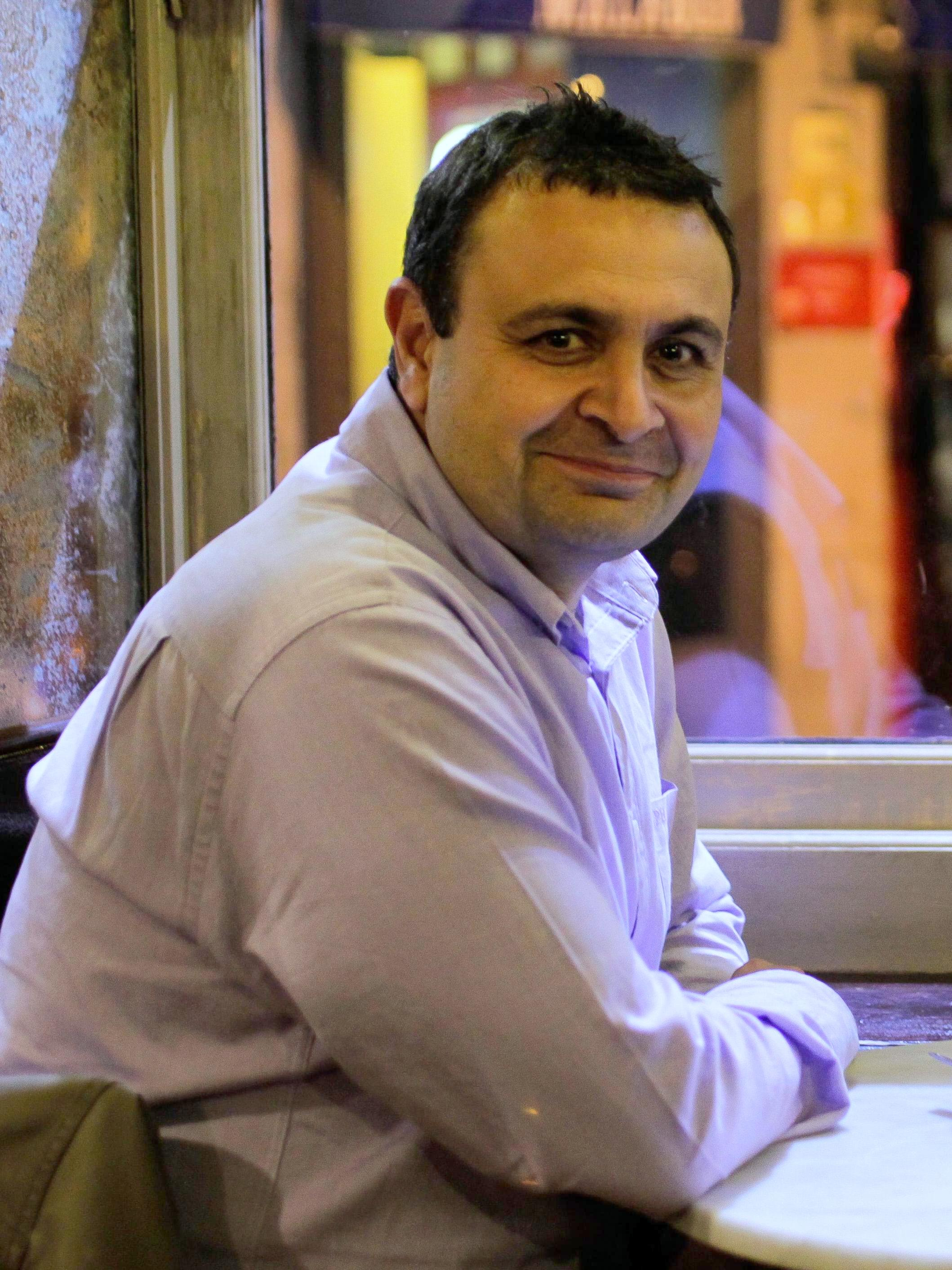
Ignacio Sánchez-Cuenca (2014).

Ignacio Sánchez-Cuenca is a Spanish social scientist based at the Charles III University of Madrid. He has been the director of the Instituto Carlos III-Juan March since its creation in 2013 from CEACS.

Sánchez-Cuenca, who earned his doctorate in sociology at the Complutense University of Madrid, has served as associate professor of sociology at the Complutense University of Madrid, Universidad de Salamanca and associate professor in the Political Science Department at the Pompeu Fabra University in Barcelona. He has also been a visiting scholar in New York University and Yale University, and taught courses in methodology at the Centro de Investigaciones Sociológicas in Madrid.

His areas of study include terrorism and the General Agreement on Tariffs and Trade (GATT) negotiations.

== Critique ==
Daniel Gascón, writing in the Mexican magazine Letras Libres, argued Sánchez-Cuenca's La desfachatez intelectual is something of a humorous fisking of his political targets, and gave it a mixed review.

== Works ==
- Controlling Governments (2008)
- Más democracia y menos liberalismo (2010)
- Años de cambios, años de crisis. Ocho años de gobiernos socialistas (2012)
- Democracia y socialdemocracia. Homenaje a José María Maravall (2012)
- Atado y mal atado. El suicidio institucional del franquismo y el surgimiento de la democracia (2014)
- La impotencia democrática. Sobre la crisis política española (2014)
- La desfachatez intelectual (2016)
